= Seabee =

Member of the US Naval Construction Forces

Naval Construction Battalions
- The Seabee logo
- Founded: 1942
- Country: United States
- Branch: United States Navy
- Type: Expeditionary Forces
- Role: Military engineering
- Size: 7,000+ active personnel; 6,927 Reserve personnel; Around 14,000 total
- Nickname: Seabees
- Mottos: Latin: Construimus, Batuimus for "We build, We fight"; "Can Do"
- Colors: United States Navy
- Mascot: Bumblebee
- Anniversaries: 28 December 1941 (formation requested); 5 March 1942 (formation authorized)
- Engagements: World War II; Guadalcanal; Bougainville; Cape Gloucester; Los Negros; Guam; Peleliu; Tarawa; Kwajalein; Saipan; Tinian; Iwo Jima; Philippines; Okinawa; North Africa; Sicily; Anzio; Normandy; Korean War; Inchon landing; Vietnam War; Khe Sanh; Dong Xoai; Chu Lai; Con Thien; Desert Storm; Operation Iraqi Freedom; Enduring Freedom
- Website: Official website

Commanders
- Notable commanders: Admiral Ben Moreell

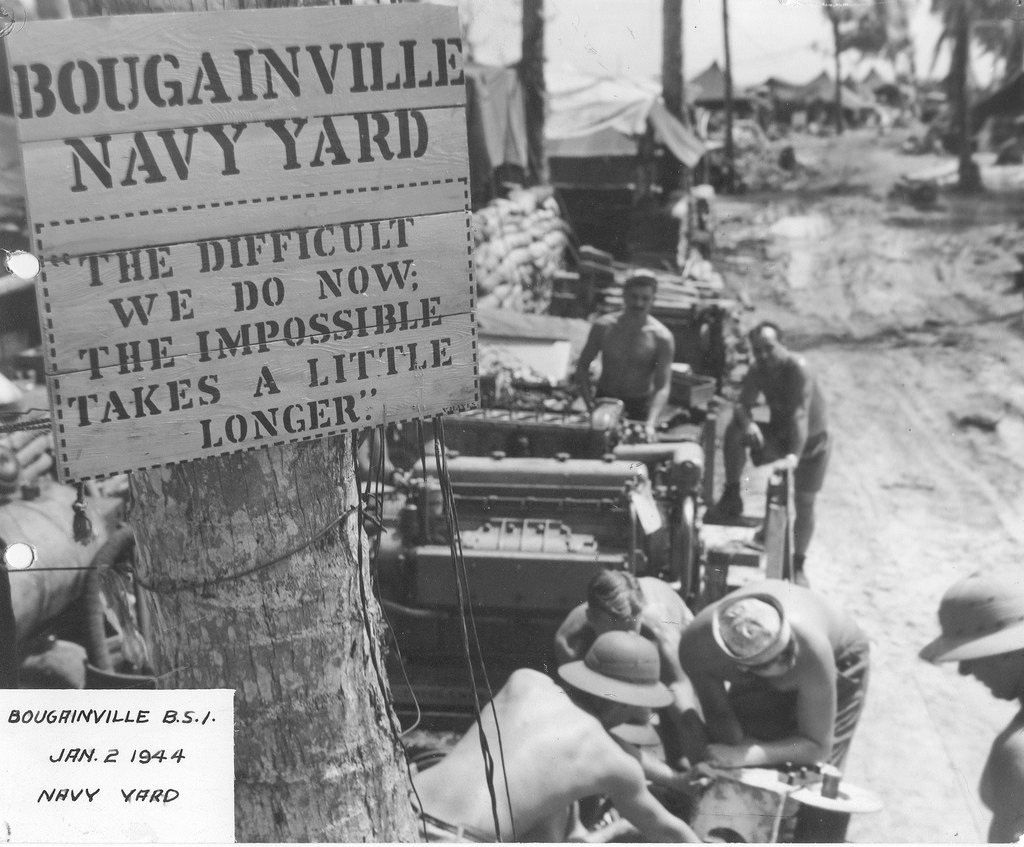
CB Navy Yard Bougainville with the Seabee Expression

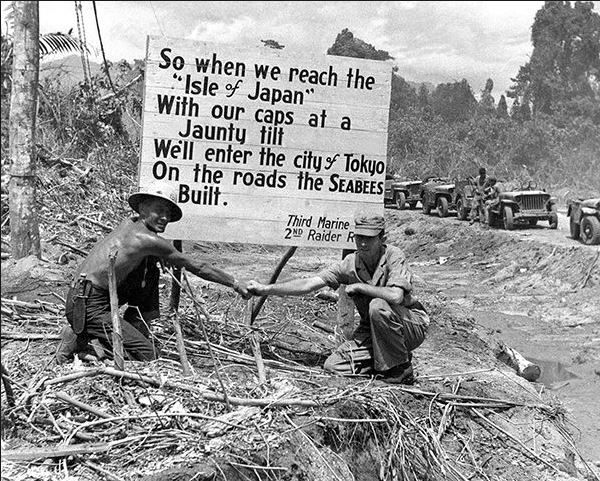
3rd Marine Div. 2nd Raider's sign on Bougainville. 53rd CB was the shore party to the 2nd Raiders of Green Beach, D-Day.

United States Naval Construction Battalions, better known as the Navy Seabees, form the U.S. Naval Construction Forces (NCF). The Seabee nickname is a heterograph of the initial letters "CB" from the words "Construction Battalion". Depending upon context, "Seabee" can refer to all enlisted personnel in the USN's occupational field 13 (OF-13), all personnel in the Naval Construction Force (NCF), or Construction Battalion. Seabees serve both in and outside the NCF. The men in the NCF considered these units to be "Seabee".

During World War II they were plank-holders of both the Naval Combat Demolition Units and the Underwater Demolition Teams (UDTs). In addition, Seabees served as elements of the United States Marine Corps (USMC), organized in specialized, self-sustaining, advanced base units known as Lions (major bases), Cubs (minor bases), and Acorns (airfields). They also provided the manpower for the top secret CWS Flame Tank Group. Today the Seabees have many special task assignments starting with Camp David and the Naval Support Unit at the Department of State. Seabees serve under both Commanders of the Naval Surface Forces Atlantic/Pacific fleets as well as on many base Public Works and USN diving commands.

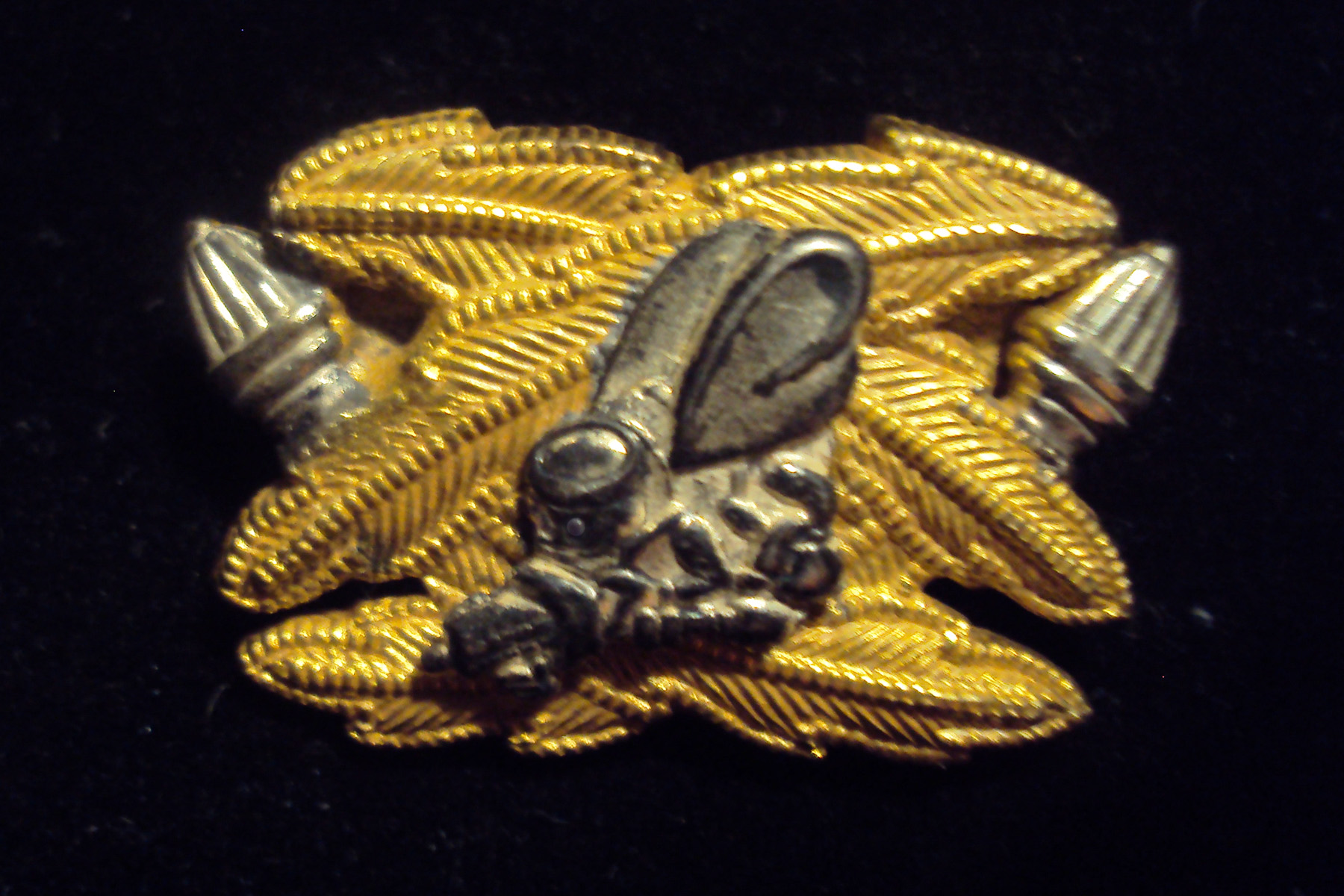
CEC Insignia

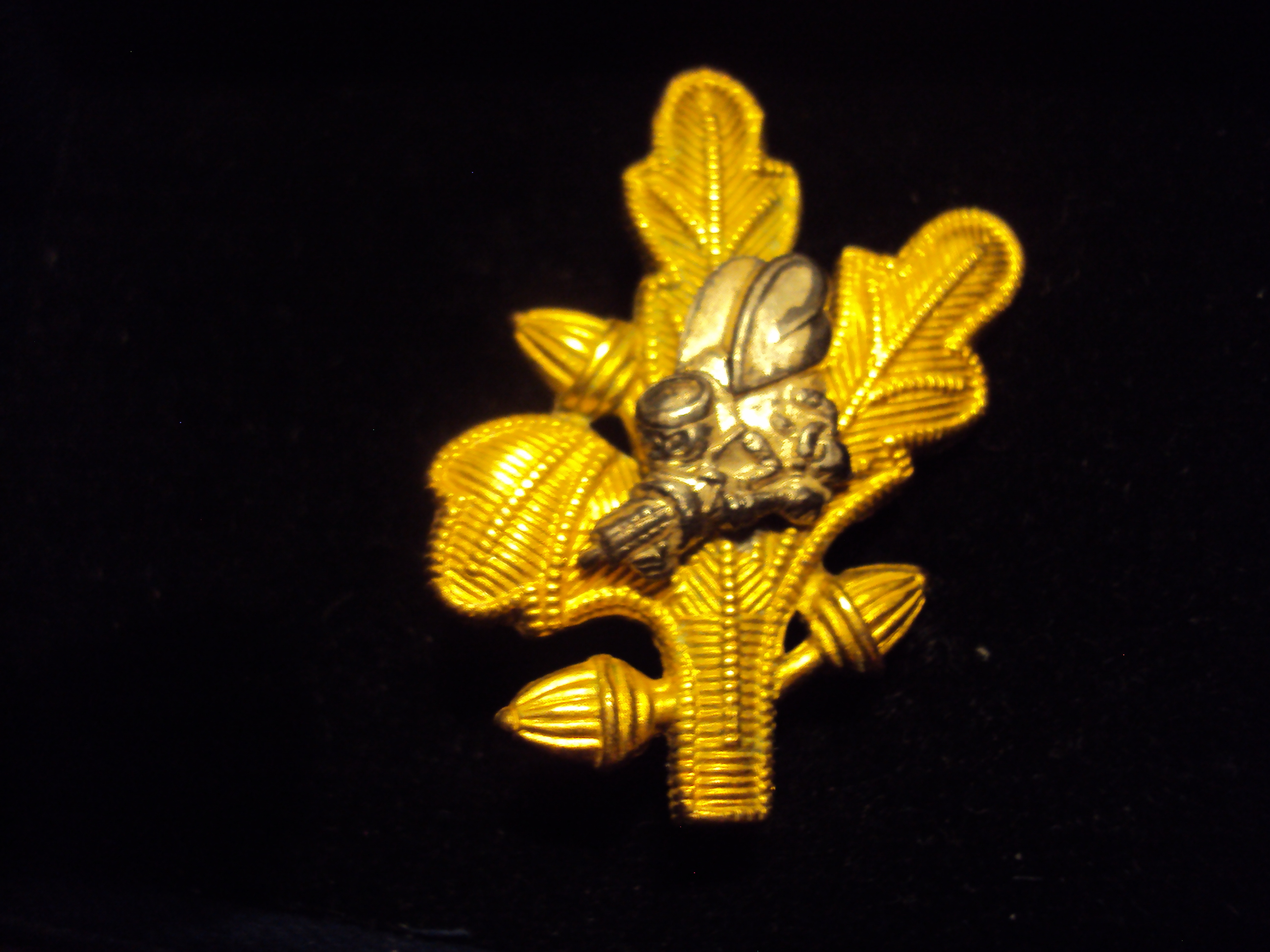
Supply Corps Insignia

WWII Naval Officers assigned to Naval Construction Battalions from the Civil Engineer Corps, Medical Corps, Dental Corps and Supply Corps had a Silver Seabee on their Corps insignia. The WWII CEC insignia is used today as the emblem of the CEC/Seabee Historical Foundation.

Naval Construction Battalions were conceived of as replacements for civilian construction companies in combat zones after the attack on Pearl Harbor. At the time civilian contractors had roughly 70,000 men working U.S.N. contracts overseas. International law made it illegal for civilian workers to resist an attack. Doing so would classify them as guerrillas and could lead to summary execution. The formation of the Seabees amidst the aftermath of the Battle of Wake Island inspired the backstory for the World War II movie The Fighting Seabees. They also feature prominently in the wartime musical drama (and subsequent film) South Pacific.

Adm. Moreell's concept model CB was a USMC trained military equivalent of those civilian companies: able to work anywhere, under any conditions or circumstances. They have a storied legacy of creative field ingenuity, stretching from Normandy and Okinawa to Iraq and Afghanistan. Adm. Ernest King wrote to the Seabees on their second anniversary, "Your ingenuity and fortitude have become a legend in the naval service." They were unique at conception and remain unchanged from Adm. Moreell's model today. In the October 1944 issue of Flying, the Seabees are described as "a phenomenon of WWII".

== Naval construction history ==
CB Conceptual Formation

In the 1930s Bureau of Yards and Docks (BuDocks) began providing for "Navy Construction Battalions" (CB) in contingency war plans. In 1934, Capt. Carl Carlson's version of the CB was approved by the chief of naval operations. In 1935, RADM. Norman Smith, head of BuDocks, selected Captain Walter Allen, War Plans Officer, to represent BuDocks on the War Plans Board. Capt. Allen presented the bureau's CB concept with the Board including it in the Rainbow war plans. The Seabees named their first training center for Capt. Allen. A criticism of the proposal was CBs would have a dual command; military control administrated by fleet line officers while construction operations would be administrated by Civil Engineer Corps officers. Additional criticisms were no provisions for the military organization or military training necessary to provide unit structure, discipline, and esprit de corps. In December 1937, RADM. Ben Moreell became BuDocks Chief and the lead proponent of the CB proposal.

In 1941, the Navy and BuDocks decided to improve project oversight of civilian contractors by creating "Headquarters Construction Companies". These companies would have 2 officers and 99 enlisted, but would do no actual construction. On 31 October 1941, RADM. Chester Nimitz, Chief of the Bureau of Navigation, authorized the formation of the 1st Headquarters Construction Company. Recruiting began in November while boot training began 7 December 1941 at Naval Station Newport. By 16 December, four additional companies had been authorized, but Pearl Harbor changed everything.

The Seabee skillset became multi-faceted with all advanced military training being USMC instruction. That training led to CBs being tasked as USMC Pioneers (Shore party) in multiple landings. They added pontoon development, fabrication, and combat utilization. The military training added frontline combat with both the Marine Corps and the Army during WWII and the Marines and Army Special forces during Vietnam. It also led to combat as machine gunners on USN LCVP and PT boats during WWII. On the construction side of their toolbox the NCF CBs were formed with skilled tradesmen making the NCF competent in all types of vertical and horizontal civil construction as well as the associated engineering. The newly formed Naval Construction Force (NCF) toolbox quickly focused on airfield and harbor construction. The toolbox was expanded to include underwater construction, demolition, as well as the related combat applications used by the Seabees that comprised the NCDU's and UDTs. The toolbox was further expanded by the creation of public works units to maintain the facilities they constructed. In addition mosquito/malaria control was added to their Public works skillset. The NCF added traditional fleet salvage, repair, and maintenance as needed. Combat engineering was added to the toolbox when CBs were transferred to the Marine Corps as elements of USMC engineering regiments. War demands added stevedoring to the toolbox both in USMC assault operations and at forward operating facilities. Weapons development and manufacture were added by the US Army Chemical Warfare Service. Polar petroleum exploration and construction were specialties that were also added. Postwar the National Science Foundation would take advantage of those skillsets. Ingenuity and resourcefulness were tools they became famous for. Postwar assignments with the CIA and State Department added further to the toolbox in electronic fields related to national security.

Their official motto is "We build, we fight." The NCF also adopted the motto "Can Do" as the force believed it could do anything it was tasked with. The Seabees boasted of this by posting signs reading: "The difficult we Can Do now, The impossible takes a little longer".

== World War II ==
The Naval Infantry Battalion Flag was mandated by Naval Regulation as the military colors for the Construction Battalions.

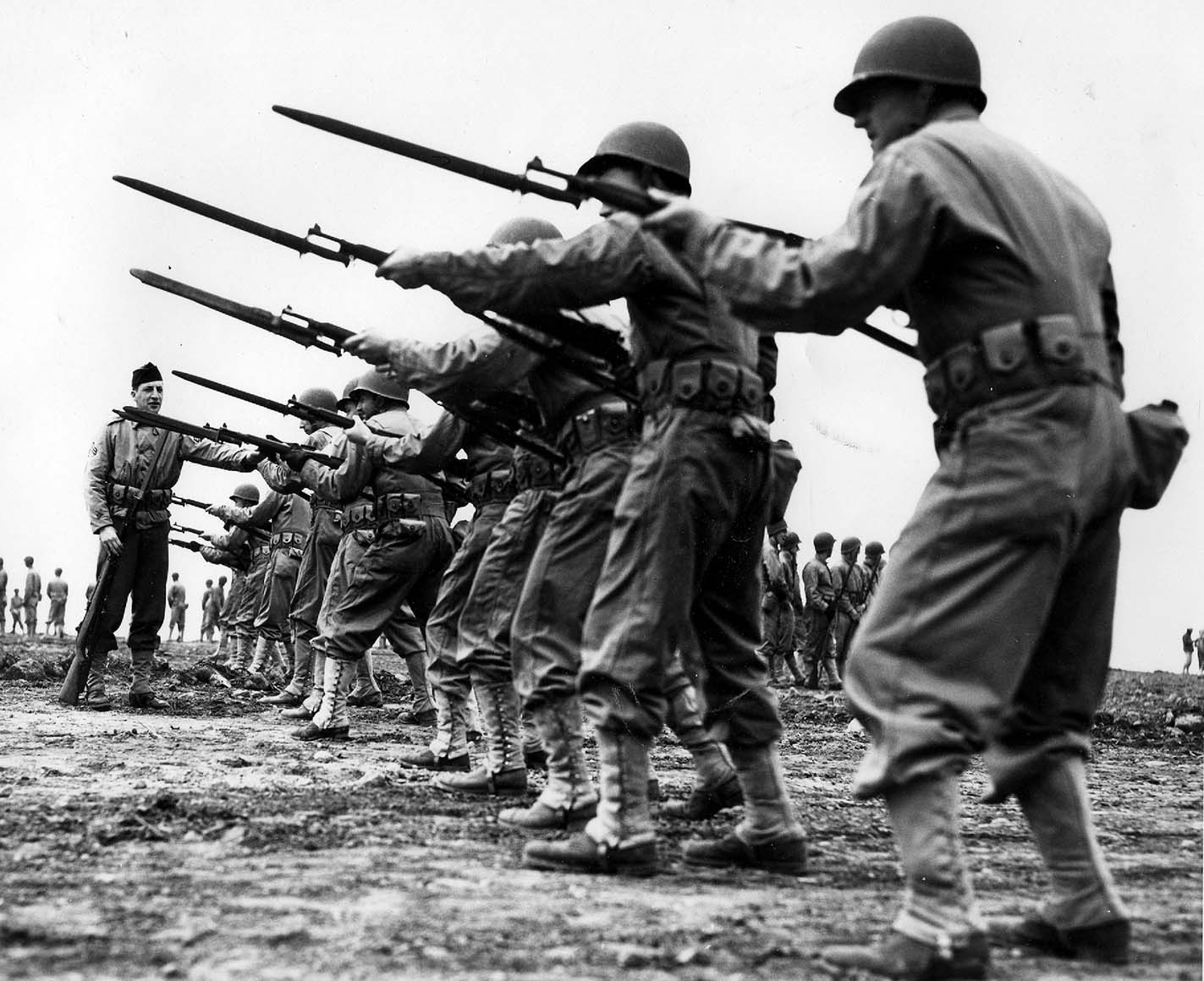
USMC-directed fixed bayonet drill at Camp Peary NTC, VA in 1943

On 28 December 1941, Adm. Moreell requested authority to commission three Naval Construction Battalions. His request was approved on 5 January 1942 by Admiral Chester W. Nimitz. The 1st HQ Construction Company was used to commission the 1st Naval Construction Detachment, which was assigned to Operation Bobcat. They were sent to Bora Bora and are known in Seabee history as "Bobcats".

Concurrently, the other requested companies had been approved. BuDocks took Companies 2 & 3 to form the 1st Naval Construction Battalion at Charleston, South Carolina. HQ Companies 4 & 5 were used for the 2nd CB. All four companies deployed independently. CBs 3, 4, & 5 were deployed the same way. CB 6 was the first battalion to deploy as a Battalion.

Before all this could happen, BuDocks had to address the dual command issue. Naval regs stated unit command was strictly limited to line officers. BuDocks deemed it essential that CBs be commanded by CEC officers trained in construction. The Bureau of Naval Personnel (BuPers) was strongly opposed. Adm. Moreell took the issue directly to the secretary of the Navy, Frank Knox. On 19 March 1942, Knox gave the CEC complete command of all NCF personnel. Almost 11,400 would become CEC during WWII with 7,960 doing CB service. Two weeks earlier, on 5 March all CB personnel were officially named "Seabees".

The first volunteers were tradesmen that received advanced rank for their trade skills. This resulted in the Seabees being the highest-paid group in uniform. To recruit these men, age and physical standards were waived up to age 50. Until November 1942 the average Seabee was 37, even so, all received the same physical training. In December, FDR ordered the Selective Service System to provide CB recruits. Enlistees could request CB service with a written statement certifying that they were trade qualified. This lasted until October 1943 when voluntary enlistment in the Seabees ceased until December 1944. By war's end, 258,872 officers and enlisted had served in the Seabees. They never reached the Navy's authorized quota of 321,056.

In 1942, initial CB boot was at Camp Allen in Norfolk, Virginia, which moved to Camp Bradford, which moved to Camp Peary and finally moved to Camp Endicott in Quonset Point, Rhode Island. CBs 1–5 were sent directly overseas for urgent projects. CBs that followed were sent to Advance Base Depots (ABDs) for deployment. Camp Rousseau at Port Hueneme became operational first and was the ABD to the Pacific. The Davisville ABD became operational in June with NTC Camp Endicott commissioned that August. Other CB Camps were Camp Parks, Livermore, Ca., and Camp Lee-Stephenson, Quoddy Village, Eastport, Maine, and Camp Holliday, Gulfport, Mississippi.

CBs sent to the Pacific were attached to one of the four Amphibious Corps: I, III, and V were USMC. The VII Amphibious Force was under General Douglas MacArthur, Supreme Commander. MacArthur said the only problem he had with the Seabees was that he didn't have enough of them.

Advance Bases

The Office of Naval Operations created a code identifying Advance Base (AB) construction as a numbered metaphor for the size/type of base. That code was also used to identify the "unit" that would be the administration for that base. These were Lion, Cub, Oak and Acorn with a Lion being a main Fleet Base (numbered 1–6). Cubs were Secondary Fleet Bases 1/4 the size of a Lion (numbered 1–12). Oak and Acorn were the names given air installations, new or captured (airfield or airstrip). Cubs quickly gained status. The speed with which the Seabees could make one operational led the Marines to consider them a tactical component. Camp Bedilion shared a common fence-line with Camp Rousseau at Port Hueneme and was home to the Acorn Assembly and Training Detachment (AATD) As the war progressed, BuDocks realized that logistics required that Advance Base Construction Depots (ABCDs) be built and CBs built seven. When the code was first created, BuDocks foresaw two CBs constructing a Lion. By 1944 an entire Regiment was being used. The invasion of Okinawa took four Construction Brigades of 55,000 men. The Seabees built the infrastructure needed to take the war to Japan. By war's end CBs had served on six continents and constructed over 300 bases on as many islands. They built everything: airfields, airstrips, piers, wharves, breakwaters, PT & seaplane bases, bridges, roads, com-centers, fuel farms, hospitals, barracks and anything else.

In the Atlantic the Seabees biggest job was the preparations for the Normandy landing. After which CBMUs 627, 628, and 629 were tasked to facilitate the crossing of the Rhine. For CBMU 629 it was front-line work. The Pacific is where 80% of the NCF deployed.

=== African American Service: the Seabee stevedores ===
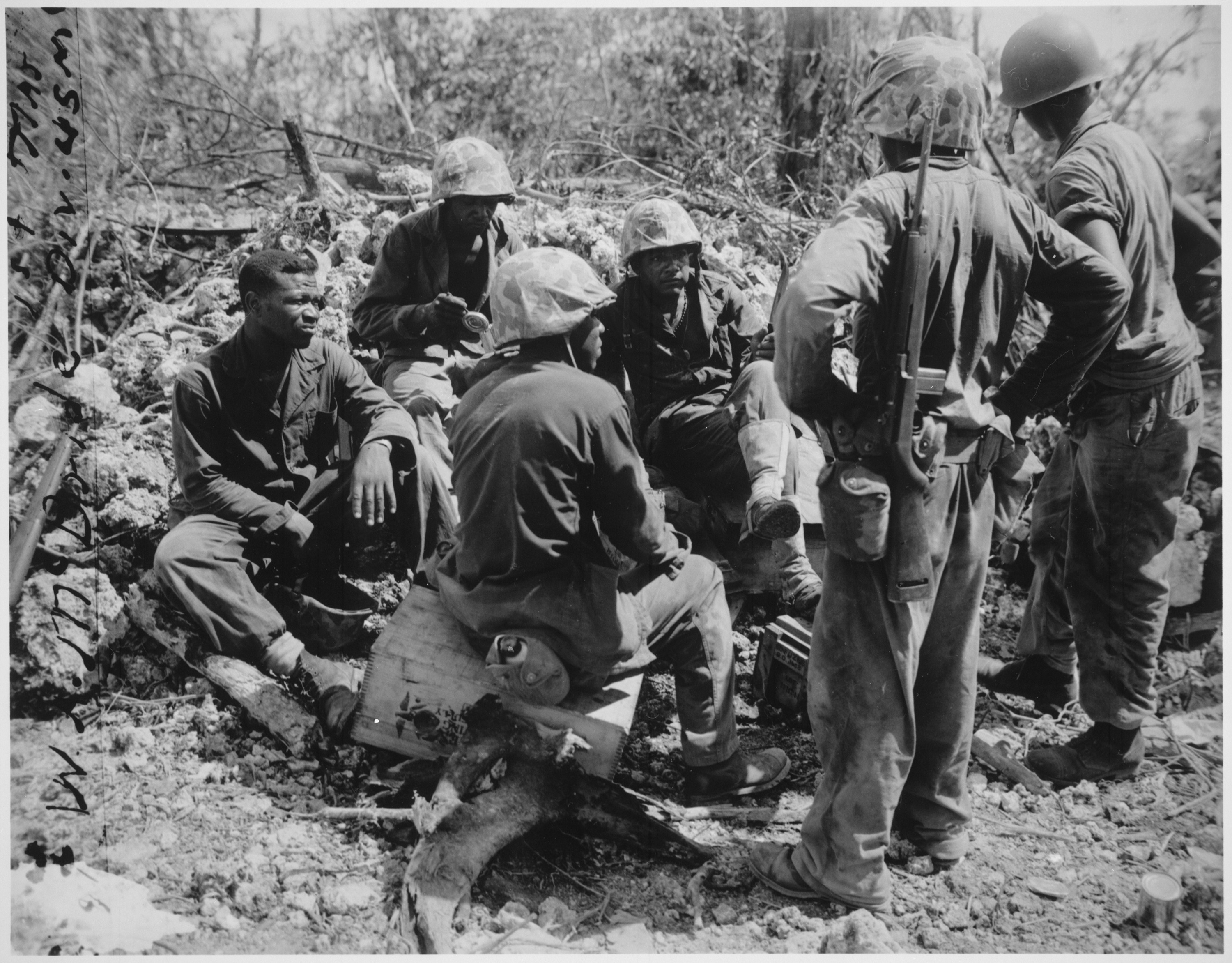
"17th Special" Seabees with the 7th Marines on Peleliu made national news in an official U.S. Navy press release. NARA-532537

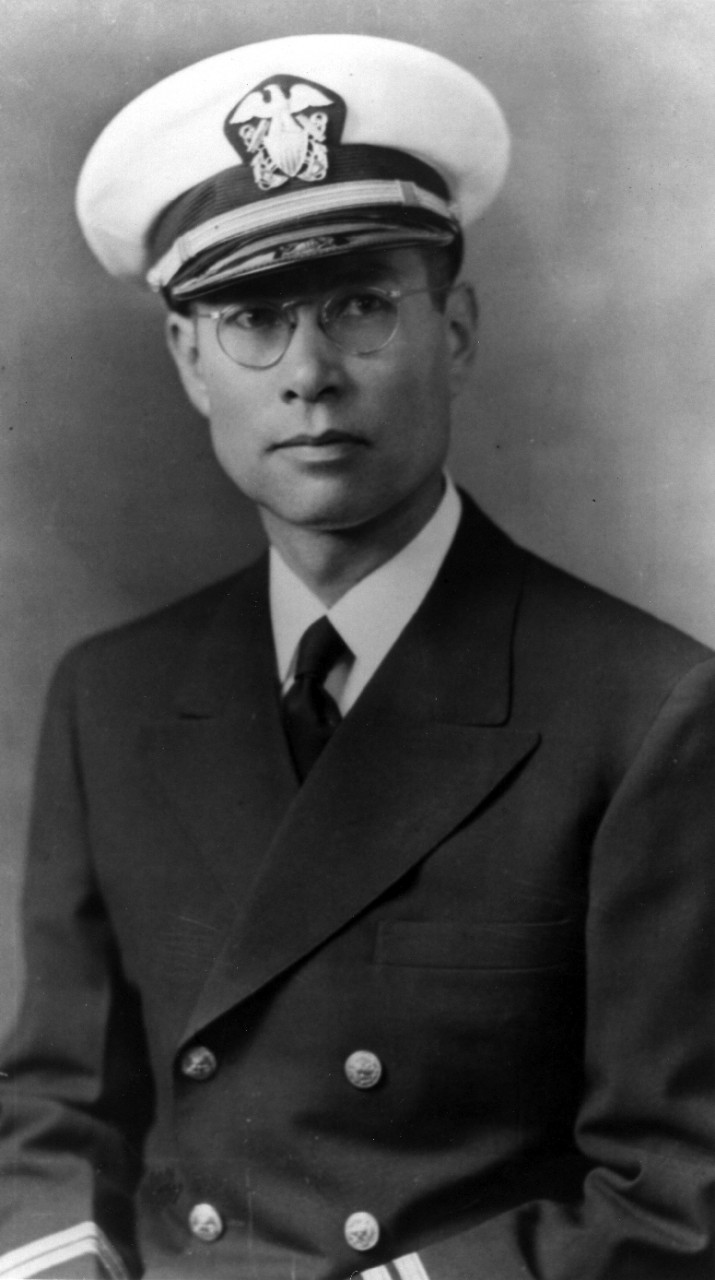
MIT grad Lt Cmdr. Edward S. Hope CEC was the most senior African American officer in the United States Navy during WWII.

In February 1942 CNO Admiral Harold Rainsford Stark recommended African Americans for ratings in the construction trades. In April the Navy announced it would enlist African Americans in the Seabees. Even so, there were just two CBs that were "colored" units, the 34th and 80th. Both had white Southern officers and black enlisted. Both battalions experienced problems with that arrangement that led to the replacement of the officers. The men of the 34th went on a hunger strike which made national news. The Commander of the 80th had 19 enlisted dishonorably discharged for sedition. The NAACP and Thurgood Marshall got 14 of those reversed.

In early 1943 the Navy commissioned its first African American officers. The first to enter the Seabees officer corps was MIT graduate Edward S. Hope. In May 1943 he completed CEC training at Camp Endicott and was posted as the Public Works officer at Manana barracks Hawaii Territory. That same year, the Navy drew up a proposal to raise the number of colored CBs to 5 and require that all non-rated men in the next 24 CBs be colored. The proposal was approved, but not acted on.

The lack of stevedores in combat zones was a huge issue for the Navy. Authorization for the formation of cargo handling CBs or "Special CBs" happened mid-September 1942. By wars end 41 Special CBs had been commissioned of which 15 were "colored". Neither the Navy or NCF used that label, the units were simply segregated in the men assigned to them. The Special CBs were the first fully integrated units in the U.S. Navy. V-J Day brought the decommissioning of all of them. The Special CBs were forerunners of today's Navy Cargo Handling Battalions of the Navy Expeditionary Logistics Support Group (United States). The arrival of 15 African American Special CBs in Pearl Harbor made segregation an issue for the 14th Naval District. For a protracted period the men lived in tents, but the disparity of treatment was obvious even to the Navy. The 14th Naval District Command felt they deserved proper shelter with at least separate but equal barracks. Manana Barracks and Waiawa Gulch became the United States' largest "colored" installation with over 4,000 Seabee stevedores barracked there. It was the site of racial strife to the point that the camp was fenced in and placed under armed guard. The Seabees were trucked to and from the docks in cattle trucks. Two naval supply depots were located at Waiawa Gulch. At wars end 12,500 African Americans would serve in the Construction Battalions.

The 17th Special CB was one of the segregated Specials and was at Peleliu in September 1944. The unit is not listed in the USMC order of battle at Peleliu despite being attached to the 1st Marine Pioneers. On D-day, the 7th Marines had a situation where they did not have the men to man the lines and get the wounded to safety. Coming to their aid were the 2 companies of the 16th Marine Field Depot (segregated) and the 17th Special CB. The Japanese mounted a banzai counter-attack at 0200 hours that night. By the time it was over, nearly the entire 17th had volunteered to carry ammunition to the front lines on the stretchers they brought the wounded back on. They filled the line where the wounded had been, manned 37mm guns that had lost crews and volunteered for anything the Marines needed. The 17th remained with the 7th Marines until the right flank had been secured D+3. There is nothing comparable in USMC history. According to the Military History Encyclopedia on the Web, "were it not for the Black Marine shore party---the (banzai) on the 7th Marines would not have been repulsed". The 17th had five men killed in action and 28 Purple Hearts awarded by Vice Admiral J.H. Hoover and Brig. General H.D. Campbell USMC.

- On Peleliu, shore party detachments from the 33rd and 73rd CBs received Presidential Unit Citations as did the primary shore party (1st Marine Pioneers). The Commander of the 17th Special CB received the same commendatory letter as the Company Commanders of the 7th Marine Ammunition Co. and the 11th Marine Depot Co. Before the battle was even over, Maj. Gen. Rupertus, USMC wrote to each:
  "The negro race can well be proud of the work performed [by the 11th Marine Depot Co./ 7th Marine Ammunition Co./ 17th Special CB]. The wholehearted co-operation and untiring efforts which demonstrated in every respect that they appreciated the privilege of wearing a Marine uniform and serving with the marines in combat. Please convey to your command these sentiments and inform them that in the eyes of the entire division they have earned a 'well done'." The Department of the Navy made an official press release 28 November 1944 of the 17th CB's copy of this letter.
- African American Seabees

=== Seabee North Slope Oil Exploration 1944 ===
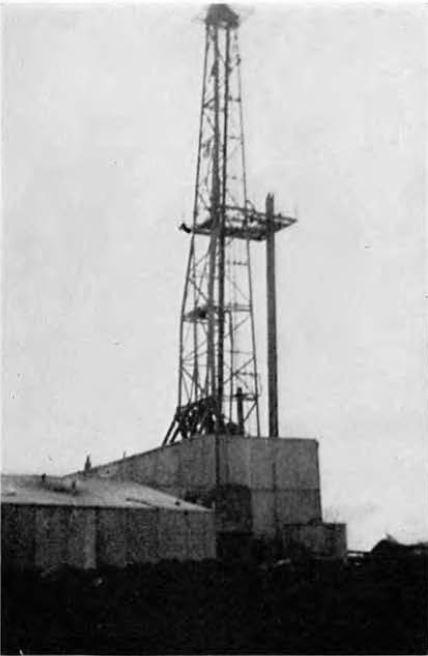
Winterized wildcat Seabee#1 at Umiat

Construction Battalion Detachment (CBD) 1058 was formed from "screening Camp Peary and the NCF for geologists, petroleum engineers, oil drillers, tool pushers, roustabouts and roughnecks" and later designated 1058. Additional personnel were chosen for their arctic experience with CBs 12 and 66. They mustered at Camp Lee Stephenson for Operation Pet 4. Congress put $1,000,000 aside to wildcat for oil in U.S. Navy Petroleum Reserve No. 4 (NPR-4) in 1944. NPR-4 had been created and placed in the oil reserve in 1923. Today NPR-4 is the National Petroleum Reserve in Alaska. The detachment's mission was:

- Do a detailed geologic study at Umiat and Cape Simpson
- Drill test and core holes
- Drill a deep well
- Do complete aerial and overland pipeline surveys for NPR 4.
- Build a base camp with a runway at Point Barrow
- Build field camp runways at Umiat and Bettles

On 19 July the USS Spica headed north with the SS Jonathan Harrington for Point Barrow and Cape Simpson. The det's base camp was constructed at Point Barrow. Four D-8s with twenty sleds of supplies were prepped for the 330-mile trek to Umiat once the tundra had frozen. The first tractor train delivered supplies, the second, heavy well equipment. The D8s would make eight trips total. When summer arrived a wildcat was drilled to 1,816' before the cold shut down operations. The hole was designated Seabee#1 It was near four known seeps at Umiat in the very south-east of NPR 4. The rock strata there was from the Upper Cretaceous and a stratum of it was named the "Seabee Formation". On the coast the Seabees drilled test holes at Cape Simpson and Point Barrow. Once the runways were completed additional supplies were flown in. In March 1946 civilians took over the project. Some Seabees of CBD 1058 were hired immediately upon discharge to continue doing the work they had been doing" The Navy applied the cold weather experience from CBD 1058 for Operation Highjump and Operation Deep Freeze. Seabee #1 remains a USGS monitor well today.

Land surveys

Twice the Seabees have been tasked with large-scale land surveys. The first was done by CBD 1058 for a proposed NPR 4 pipeline route to Fairbanks. The Trans-Alaskan pipeline follows a portion of their survey from roughly the Arctic Circle to Fairbanks. The second would be done by a Seabee team from MCB 10. They went to Vietnam in 1956 to survey and map the existing road network. That survey was extensively used during the Vietnam War.

Malaria and Epidemic Control Group

Navy Medicine created the Malaria and Epidemic Control Group to deal with insect-borne diseases. Between August 1942, and February 1943, American troops in the Pacific averaged ten malaria cases for every combat injury. Seabees oiled, drained and sprayed mosquito breeding areas and inspected and fumigated ships and aircraft transiting malaria-infested areas. It was an important task that absolutely needed to be done in order for the United States to field an effective combat force. On Guadalcanal the 63rd CB had malaria control as its primary task. At Gulfport a school was established to train Battalions for the Malaria and Epidemic Control Group.

== World War II Seabees outside the NCF ==
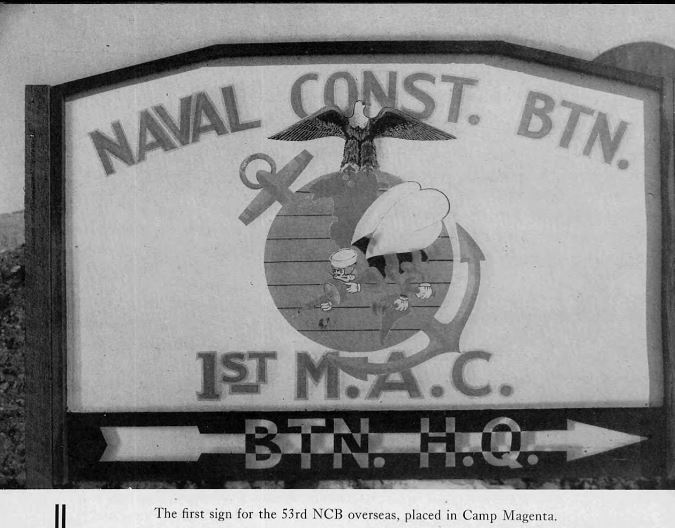
53rd Construction Battalion sign

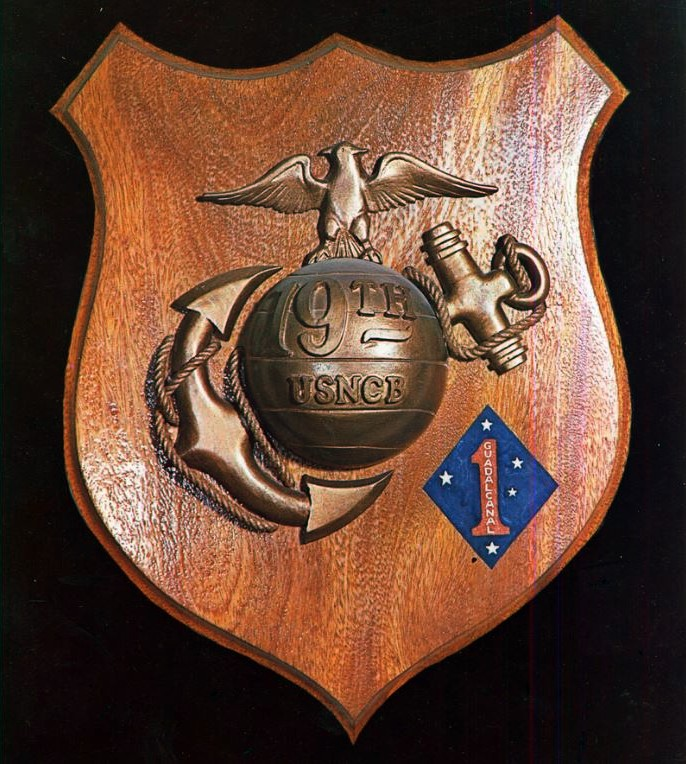
19th CB Plaque produced while designated 3rd Battalion 17th Marines

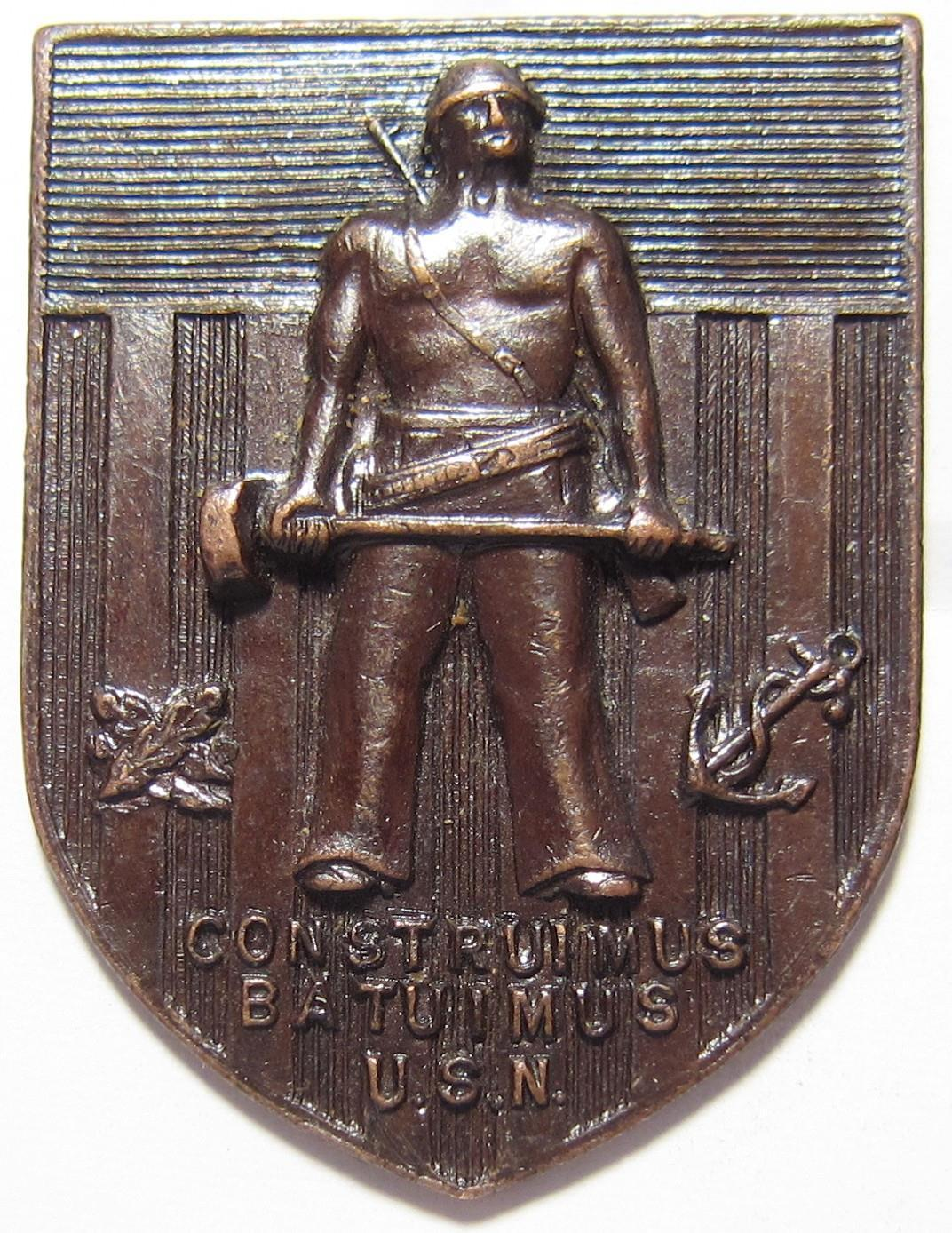
CB insignia worn on USMC issue garrison cap.

Fleet Marine Force Combat Operation Insignia for Seabees and Corpsmen.

During World War II Seabees were tasked outside the NCF in the USMC, NCDUs, and UDTs.

=== Marine Corps ===
USMC historian Gordon L. Rottman wrote "that one of the biggest contributions the Navy made to the Marine Corps during WWII was the creation of the Seabees". In exchange, the Corps would be influential upon the CB organization and its history. After the experience of Guadalcanal the Department of War decided that the Marines and Seabees would make all subsequent landings together. That arrangement led to numerous Seabee claims that they had landed first, even leaving signs on the beach asking the Marines "What took you so long?" The Seabees in the UDTs made an effort of this of which their mates in the CBs approved.

When the first three CBs were formed the Seabees did not have a base of their own. Upon leaving boot the recruits were sent to National Youth Administration camps in Illinois, New Jersey, New York, and Virginia to receive military training from the Marine Corps. The Marine Corps listed CBs on their Table of organization: "D-Series Division" for 1942, "E-Series Division" for 1943, and "Amphibious Corps" for 1944–45.

When CBs were created the Marine Corps wanted one for each of the three Marine Divisions, but were told no because of war priorities. Even so, early Seabee units were connected with Marine Corps ops. The 1st Naval Construction Detachment (Bobcats) together with and A Co CB 3 was transferred to the Marines and redesignated 3rd Battalion 22nd Marines. The Bobcats had deployed without receiving advanced military training. The 22nd Marines took care of that. The 4th Construction Detachment was attached to the 5th Marine Defense Battalion for two years.

By autumn, the 18th, 19th and 25th CBs had been transferred to the Corps as combat engineers. Each was attached to a composite engineer regiment, redesignated as 3rd Battalion: 17th Marine Regiment, 18th Marine Regiment, 19th Marine Regiment, and 20th Marine Regiment. The 18th and 19th CBs each claim to have been the first CBs authorized to wear standard USMC issue. Both received their military training and USMC duffle bag at MTC New River, NC. There is no record of how many CBs received USMC issue. It is known that the 31st, 43rd, 76th, 121st and 133rd CBs received partial or complete issues. On 15 January 1944 the 142nd CB was commissioned at New River, Camp Lejeune. On 2 February that Battalion arrived at Camp Pendelton for further training, mounting out 19 April.

After Guadalcanal amphibious operations became joint USMC/Seabee pairings. The 6th CB joined the 1st Marine Division after combat had started on Guadalcanal. The 18th CB was sent to join them from Fleet Marine Force depot Norfolk. Many more would follow. The 6th Special CB was tasked to the 4th Marines Depot in the Russells. November saw the 14th CB tasked to the 2nd Raider Bn on Guadalcanal. In June, the 24th CB had been tasked to the 9th Marine Defense Bn on Rendova. The 33rd and 73rd CBs had dets tasked to the 1st Pioneers as shore party on Peleliu as was the 17th Special CB colored. At Enogi Inlet on Munda, a 47th det was shore party to the 1st and 4th Marine Raiders. The 3rd Marine Div. made the Commander of the 71st CB shore party commander on Bougainville. His 71st had support from the 25th, 53rd, and 75th CBs. At Cape Torokina the 75th had 100 men volunteer to make the assault of the 3rd Marines. Also at Bougainville, the 53rd provided shore parties to the 2nd Raiders on green beach and the 3rd Raiders on Puruata Island. The 121st was formed at the CB Training Center of MTC Camp Lejuene as 3rd Bn 20th Marines. They would be shore party to the 23rd Marines on Roi-Namur, Saipan, and Tinian.

When the Marine Engineer Regiments were inactivated in 1944, CBs were then tasked to Marine Divisions. For Iwo Jima, the 31st and 133rd were attached to the 4th and 5th Marine Divisions. The 133rd was shore party to the 23rd Marines. while the 31st CB was in the 5th Shore Party Regiment. The 31st demolitionsmen attached directly to the Division. The 8th Marine Field Depot was the shore party command eschelon for Iwo Jima. They requested 26 heavy equipment operators and received volunteers from CB 8. Okinawa saw the 58th, 71st, 130th, and 145th CBs detached from the Navy and tasked to the Marine Corps 6th, 2nd, and 1st Marine Divisions respectively.

From Iwo Jima the 5th Marine Div. returned to Camp Tarawa to have the 116th CB attached. When Japan fell the 116th CB was part of the occupation force. V-J Day left thousands of Japanese troops in China and the III Marine Amphibious Corps was sent there to get them home. The 33rd NCR was assigned to III Marine Amphib. Corps for this mission.

CBs were also tasked individually to the three USMC Amphibious Corps. The 19th CB started out with the I MAC prior to joining the 17th Marines. The 53rd CB was attached to I MAC as Naval Construction Battalion I M.A.C. When I MAC was redesignated III Amphibious Corps the battalion became an element of the 1st Provisional Marine Brigade. For Guam, III Amphibious Corps had the 2nd Special CB, 25th, and 53rd CBs. The CO 25 CB was shore party commander for the 3rd Marines on beaches Red 1 and Red 2. The 3rd Marines would award 25's shore party 17 bronze stars. V Amphibious Corps (VAC) had the 23rd Special and 62nd CBs on Iwo Jima. On Tinian the 6th Construction Brigade was attached to V Amphibious Corps.

- Two sections of CBMU 515 saw combat with the 22nd Marines on Guam.
- When the decision was made to construct Marine Corps Base, Camp Pendleton in 1942, BuDocks issued the main contracts to civilian contractors. However, the base project was so large that some smaller contracts were awarded to the Seabees, one of which was a Quonsent Camp for USMC instruction of Naval Construction Battalions in area 25(Vado del Rio). Seabees were also involved in the construction of Camp Del Mar in area 21 and erected a temporary construction camp close by while they were assigned.

When the war ended the Seabees had a unique interservice standing with the U.S. Marine Corps. Seabee historian William Bradford Huie wrote "that the two have a camaraderie unknown else-wheres in the U.S. military". Even though they are "Navy" the Seabees adopted USMC fatigues with a Seabee insignia in place of the EGA. At least 10 CB units incorporated USMC insignia into theirs. Admiral Moreell wrote, tongue in cheek, that the Marines were the best fighting men in the Pacific, but one had to serve 90 days with the Seabees to qualify to as a "Junior Bee".

=== Naval Combat Demolition Units ===
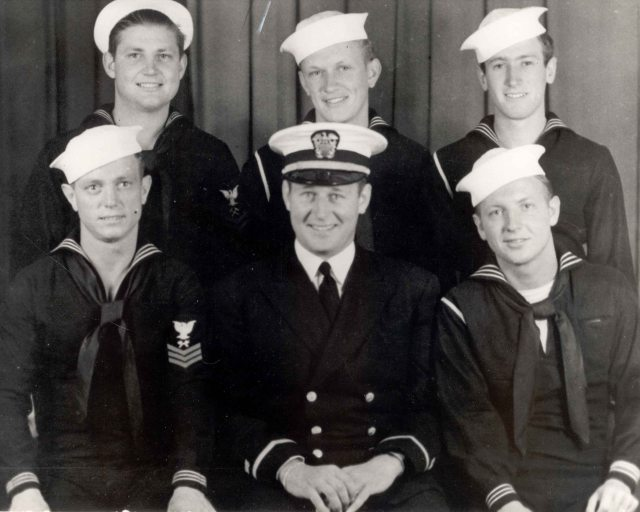
"NCDU 45", Ensign Karnowski (CEC), ChCarp. Conrad C. Millis, MMCB2 Lester Meyers and three gunners mates. The unit received a Presidential Unit Citation with Ens. Karnowski earning the Navy Cross & French Croix de Guerre with Palm, while MM2 Meyers received a Silver Star. Two men were wounded and one killed.

In early May 1943, a two-phase "Naval Demolition Project" was ordered by the Chief of Naval Operations "to meet a present and urgent requirement" for the invasion of Sicily. Phase-1 began at Amphibious Training Base (ATB) Solomons, Maryland, with the creation of Operational Naval Demolition Unit # 1. Six Officers led by Lt. Fred Wise CEC and eighteen enlisted reported from Camp Peary dynamiting and demolition school. Seabees called them "Demolitioneers". Naval Combat Demolition Units (NCDUs) consisted of one junior CEC officer, five enlisted, and were numbered 1–216. After that first group had been trained, Lt. Commander Draper Kauffman was selected to command the program. It had been set up in Camp Peary's "Area E"(explosives) at the dynamiting and demolition school. Between May and mid-July, the first six NCDU classes graduated at Camp Peary. While the program was at Camp Peary the men were given head-of-the-line privileges at the mess hall. The program was moved to Fort Pierce where the first class began mid-July. Despite the move, Camp Peary remained Kauffman's primary recruit center. "He would go back to the dynamite school, assemble the (Seabees) in the auditorium and say, 'I need volunteers for hazardous, prolonged and distant duty.'" Fort Pierce had two CB units assigned, CBD 1011 and CBMU 570. They were tasked with the construction and maintenance of obstacles needed for demolition training.

The invasion of Normandy had 34 NCDUs. When the first ten arrived in England they had no CO. Lt. Smith (CEC) assumed the role, splitting them up to train with the 146th, 277th and 299th Combat Engineers. As more NCDUs arrived they did the same, with 5 combat engineers attached to each NCDU. Group III (Lt. Smith) did research and development and is credited with developing the Hagensen Pack. NCDUs had a 53% casualty rate at Normandy. Four from Utah beach later took part in Operation Dragoon.

With Europe invaded, Admiral Turner requisitioned all available NCDUs from Fort Pierce for integration into the UDTs for the Pacific. That netted him 20 NCDUs that had received Presidential Unit Citations and another 11 that had gotten Navy Unit Commendations. Prior to Normandy 30 NCDUs had embarked to the Pacific and another three had gone to the Mediterranean. NCDUs 1–10 were staged at Turner City on Florida Island in the beginning of 1944. NCDU 1 was briefly in the Aleutians in 1943. The first NCDUs in combat were 4 and 5 with the 4th Marines on Green Island, Papua New Guinea and Emirau Island. Later, NCDUs 1–10 were combined to form the short-lived UDT Able. NCDUs 2, 3, 19, 20, 21 and 24 were assigned to MacArthur's 7th Amphibious Force and were the only NCDUs remaining at the war's end.

see Notes

=== Underwater Demolition Teams (UDT)s ===
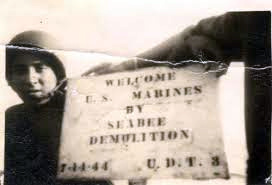
Seabees in both UDT 3 and 4 made signs to greet the Marines assaulting Guam. Lt. Crist confiscated this sign. However, Team 4 was able to leave theirs on the beach for the Marines to see that the Seabees had been there first.

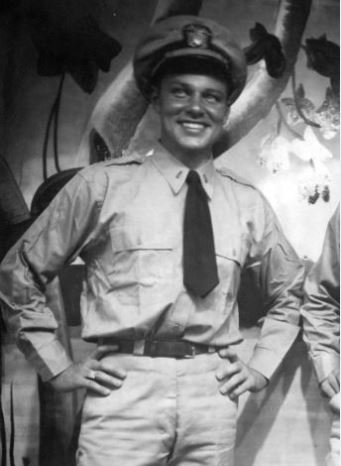
Lt Luehrs was one of the 30 Officers from the 7th NCR that Lt. Crist staged for UDTs 1 & 2. He and Chief Acheson were the first UDT swimmers.

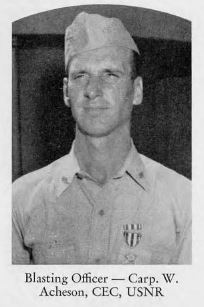
Carp. W. H. Acheson Silver Star ceremony for UDT 1 action at Engibi where he stripped down to swim trunks and did reconnaissance in broad daylight on a hostile beach becoming a role model of UDTs being swimmers.

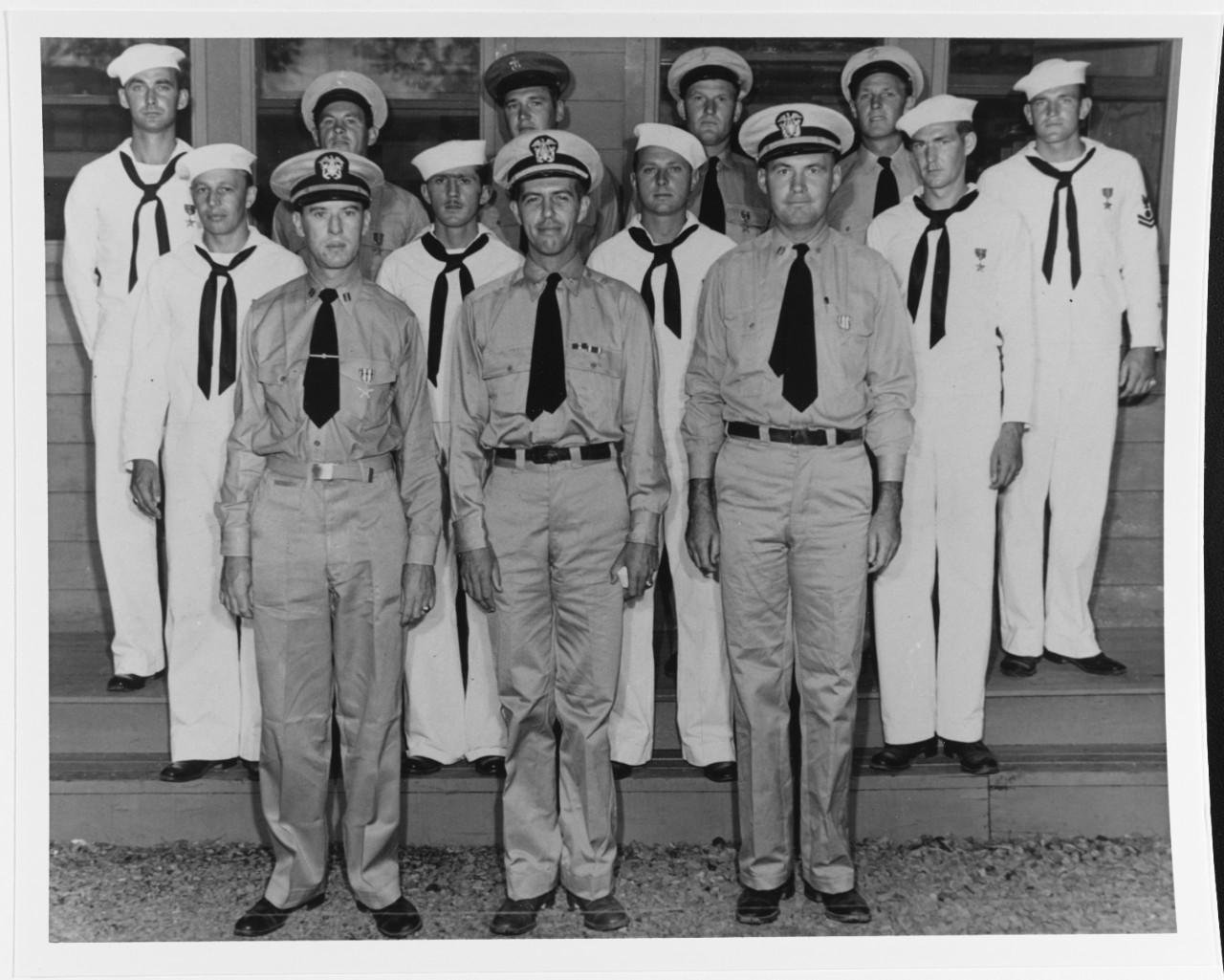
Lt. Crist(CEC), Lt. Cmdr. Kaufmann, and Lt. Carberry right to left at Silver and bronze stars awards

Prior to Operation Galvanic and Tarawa, V Amphibious Corps had identified coral as an issue for future amphibious operations. RADM Kelly Turner, commander V Amphibious Corps had ordered a review to get a grip on the problem. VAC found that the only people having any applicable experience with the material were men in the Naval Construction Battalions. Lt. Thomas C. Crist, of CB 10, was in Pearl Harbor from Canton Island where he had been in charge of clearing coral heads. His being in Pearl Harbor was pivotal in UDT history. While there he learned of the Adm. Turner's interest in coral blasting and met with him. The Admiral tasked Lt. Crist to develop a method for blasting coral under combat conditions and putting together a team to do it. Lt. Crist started by getting men from CB 10, but got the remainder from the 7th Construction Regiment. By 1 December 1943 he had close to 30 officers and 150 enlisted at Waipio Amphibious Operating Base on Oahu.

In November the Navy had a hard lesson with coral and tides at Tarawa. It prompted Adm. Turner to request the creation of nine Underwater Demolition Teams to address those issues. Six teams for VAC in the Central Pacific while the other three would go to III Amphibious Corps in the South Pacific. UDTs 1 & 2 were formed from the 180 men Lt. Crist had staged. Seabees make up the majority of the men in teams 1–9, 13 and 15. How many Seabees were in UDTs 10 and 12 is not listed, for UDT 11 they composed 20% of the team. UDT officers were mainly CEC. UDT 10 had 5 officers and 24 enlisted originally trained as OSS Maritime Unit: Operational Swimmer Group II, but the OSS was not allowed to operate in the Pacific Theater. Adm. Nimitz needed swimmers and approved their transfer from the OSS to his control. The MU men brought with the swimfins they had trained with and the Seabees made them a part of UDT attire as quickly as the Supply dept. could get them. In the Seabee dominated teams the next largest group of UDT volunteers came from the joint Army-Navy Scouts and Raiders school that was also in Fort Pierce. Additional volunteers came from the Navy's Bomb disposal School, Marine Corps and U.S. Fleet.

The first team commanders were Cmdr. E.D. Brewster (CEC) UDT 1 and Lt. Crist (CEC) UDT 2. Both Teams were "provisional" totaling the 180 men Lt Crist had put together from the 7th NCR. Those men were put through five weeks of training by a Marine Corps Amphibious Reconnaissance Battalion. They wore fatigues, life-vests and were expected to stay in their rubber boats like the NCDUs. At Kwajalein Adm.Turner ordered daylight recon. It was apparent to the Seabees that staying in the boats would not get the Admiral the intel he wanted. Cmdr. Brewester's men all wore swim trucks under their fatigues. Ensign Lewis F. Luehrs, and Charp. Bill Acheson spent 45 minutes in the water in broad daylight and were the first team members recovered. Still wet and in their trunks they reported directly to Adm. Turner. He concluded what they had done was the only way to get accurate intelligence on submerged obstacles and conveyed that opinion to Adm. Nimitz. At Engebi Cmdr. Brewster was wounded. The success of UDT-1 not following USMC Recon protocol rewrote the UDT mission model and training regimen. Ens. Luehrs and Charp. Acheson were each awarded a Silver Star for their initiative while unintentionally creating the UDT "naked warrior" image. Diving masks were uncommon in 1944 and some men had tried using goggles at Kwajalein. Diving masks were a rare item in Hawaii so Lt. Crist and CB Chief Howard Roeder had requested supply get them. A fortuitous observation by one of the men spotted a magazine advertisement for diving masks. A priority dispatch was made to the States that appropriated the store's entire stock. The UDTs adopted goggles independent of the OSS. When UDTs 1 and 2 returned to Hawaii Chief Acheson and three other UDT Officers were transferred to the 301st dredging CB. The 301st had 12 dredges saving Teams from blasting channels, but needed divers to get the job done. Ensign Leuhrs made Lt. and was a member of UDT 3 until he was made XO of team 18. Commander Brewster's purple heart got him out of the UDTs and elevated to Commander 7th NCR instead of back to CB 10.

Adm. Turner also requested the formation of a Demolition Training Center at Kihei. It was approved. The actions of UDT 1 provided the training model, making UDT training distinctly different from Fort Pierce's NCDU program. Lt. Crist was briefly the first training officer and emphasized swimming and recon until he was made CO of UDT 3. When UDT 3 returned from Leyte in the fall of 1944 it became the school instructors with Lt. Crist again OIC of training. The classes now included: night ops, weapons, bivouacking, small unit tactics, along with coral and lava blasting. In April 1945, team 3 was sent to Fort Priece to instruct there. Lt. Crist was promoted to Lt. Cmdr. and sent back to Kihei. Team 3 would train teams 12–22. UDT 14 is called the first "all fleet team" even though it had Seabees from Team Able and the CO and XO were both CEC. UDT 15 was the last team formed of NCDUs. Teams 12–15 were sent to Iwo Jima. Three cleared the shoreline for five days, D+2-D+7. After July 1944 new UDTs were only USN. In 1945, CBMU 570 was tasked to the UDT coldwater training center at ATB Oceanside, CA.

On Guam team 8 requested permission to build a base. It was approved by AdComPhibsPac, but disapproved by Island Command. Team 8 turned to the CBs on the island and got everything needed. Coral paving got placed the night before Admiral Nimitz inspected, giving teams 8 & 10 a glowing review.

By V-J day 34 teams had been formed. Teams 1–21 saw actual deployment with the Seabees providing over half of the men in those teams. The Navy did not publicize the existence of the UDTs until post-war and when they did they gave credit to Lt. Cmdr. Kauffman and the Seabees. During World War II the Navy did not have a rating for the UDTs nor did they have an insignia. Those men with the CB rating on their uniforms considered themselves Seabees that were doing underwater demolition. They did not call themselves "UDTs" or "Frogmen", but rather "Demolitioneers" reflecting where Lt. Cmdr. Kauffman had recruited them from, the CB dynamiting and demolition school.

UDTs had to be of standard recruiting age, Seabees older could not volunteer. Mid-year 1945, in preparation for the cooler waters around Japan, a cold water training center was created. With it came a more demanding physical. Team 9 lost 70% of the team to this change.

Postwar, MCB 7 was tasked with projects at the UDT training facility on St. Thomas, Virgin Islands

see Notes

== Cold War ==
When World War II ended the Cold War began. Seabee service during this period supported a broad spectrum of the national interest; nuclear testing, two wars, embassy security, space race, CIA, military communications, international relations, pure science, and Camp David.

=== Postwar interlude: Siberia-China ===
On V-J-Day CB 114 was in the Aleutians. In September 1945 the battalion sent a detachment to the USSR to build a Fleet Weather Central. It was located 10 miles (16 km) outside Petropavlovsk-Kamchatsky on the Kamchatka Peninsula. The original agreement gave the Seabees 3 weeks to complete the base. Upon arrival the Russians told them they had 10 days and were amazed it was done in 10. It was one of two that Stalin agreed to.

V-J-Day brought about Operation Beleaguer and the repatriation of the Japanese Army from China. Elements of the 33rd CB Regiment were involved: CBs 83, 96, 122 and 32nd Special. These units landed at Qingdao and Tanggu in November 1945 attached to the 6th Marine Division. CB 42 and A Co. 33rd Special landed at Shanghai with Naval Advance Base Unit 13. With the war over, the ongoing discharge men eligible left only enough for one CB and the two CB Specials. The men were consolidated in the 96th with the other CBs decommissioned. In December the 96th started airfields at Qingdao and Qinhuangdao in support of III Marine Amphibious Corps operations. May 1946 CB III Marine Amphibious Corps was ordered to inactivate the 96th CB on 1 August. The 96th was transferred to the 4th Marines, 1st Marine Division and deactivated from them.

=== Nuclear tests ===
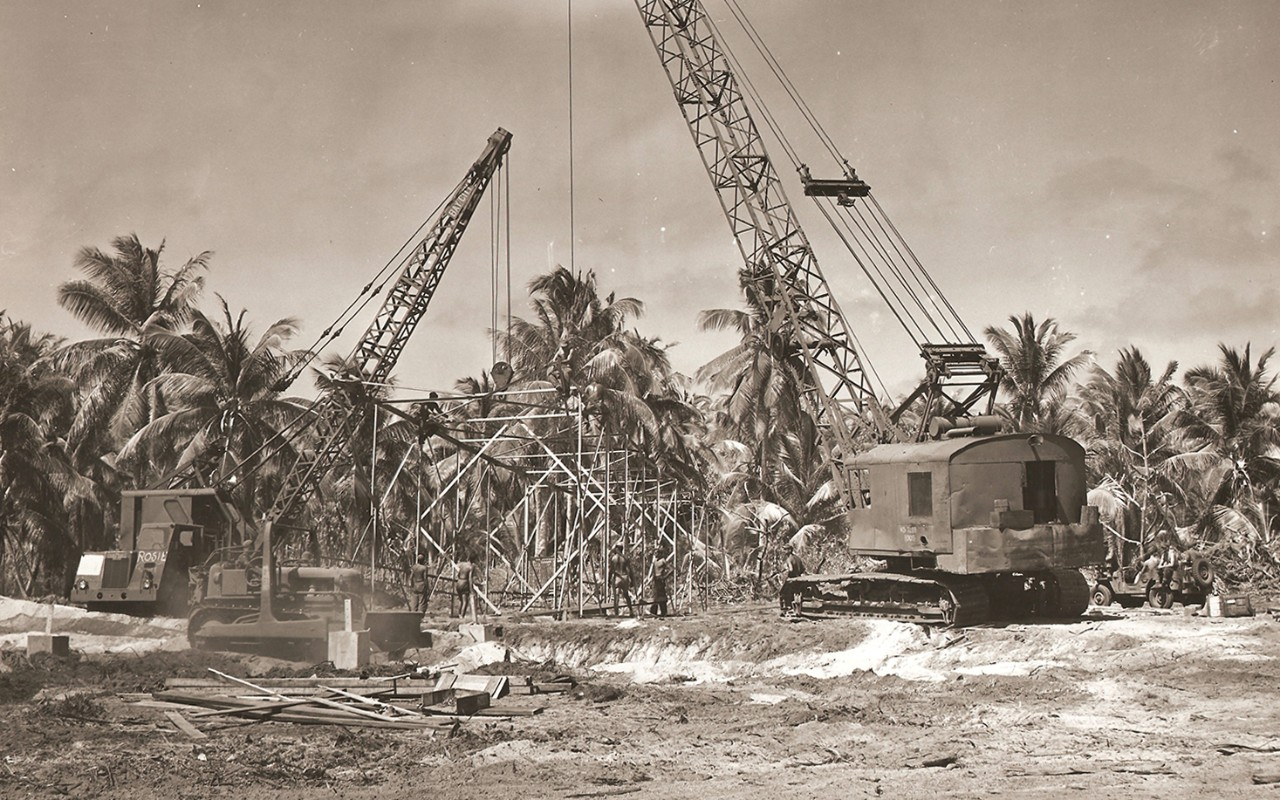
The 53rd CB erecting camera towers on Bikini Atoll for filming the tests.

In early 1946 the 53rd NCB was deployed with Operation Crossroads for the nuclear testing at Bikini Atoll. It was designated Task Unit TU 1.8.6. 53's project list included observation, instrument and communication towers, radio beacons, seismic huts, photo reference crosses, general base and recreational facilities, as well as dredging the lagoon. In addition, recreational facilities were constructed on Japtan Island for the ships crews of the Operation. The Battalion also assisted the relocation of the natives. They disassembled both the Community center and church for reassembly on Rongerik Atoll. In August the battalion was decommissioned with men transferred to CBD 1156 that was then commissioned on Bikini. The TU 1.8.6 designation transferred to the CBD. CBD 1156 remained for nine days after the second test.

UDT 3 was designated TU 1.1.3 for the operation. On 27 April 1946, seven officers and 51 enlisted embarked at CBC Port Hueneme for Bikini. Their assignment was to retrieve water samples from ground zero of the Baker blast. In 1948, the displaced bikinians put in a request that a channel to the island Kili where they had been relocated be made. This was given to the Seabee detachment on Kwajelin who requested UDT 3 assist.

The 121st CB was decommissioned in December and re-designated CBD 1504. In January 1947 CBs 104 and 105 were reactivated. The 30th NCR was home-ported on Guam composed of CBDs 1501-13 and NCB 103. In 1949, the 103rd was made a Mobile Construction Battalion (MCB) while CBs 104 and 105 were made Amphibious Construction Battalions(ACBs). From 1949 until 1968 CBs were designated MCBs. In 1949, MCB 1 was reactivated at Naval Amphibious Base Little Creek, VA. In June 1950 the NCF totaled a few thousand.

=== Korean War ===
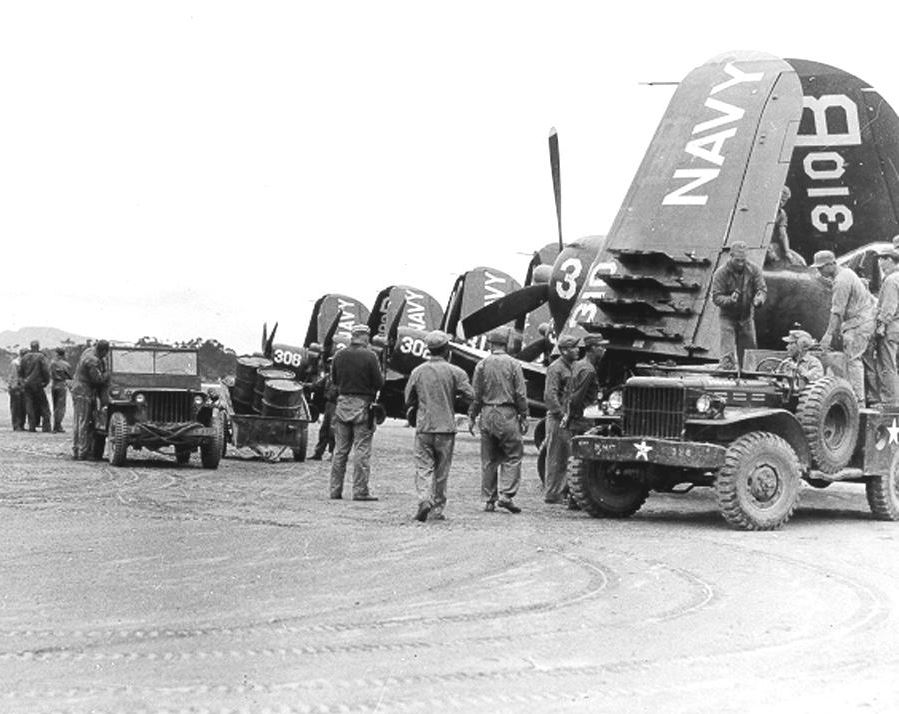
Yo Do Island airfield constructed behind enemy lines by ACB 1. It was credited with saving 60 aviators. Seabees in photo are refueling Corsairs on 15 July 1952. (USN)

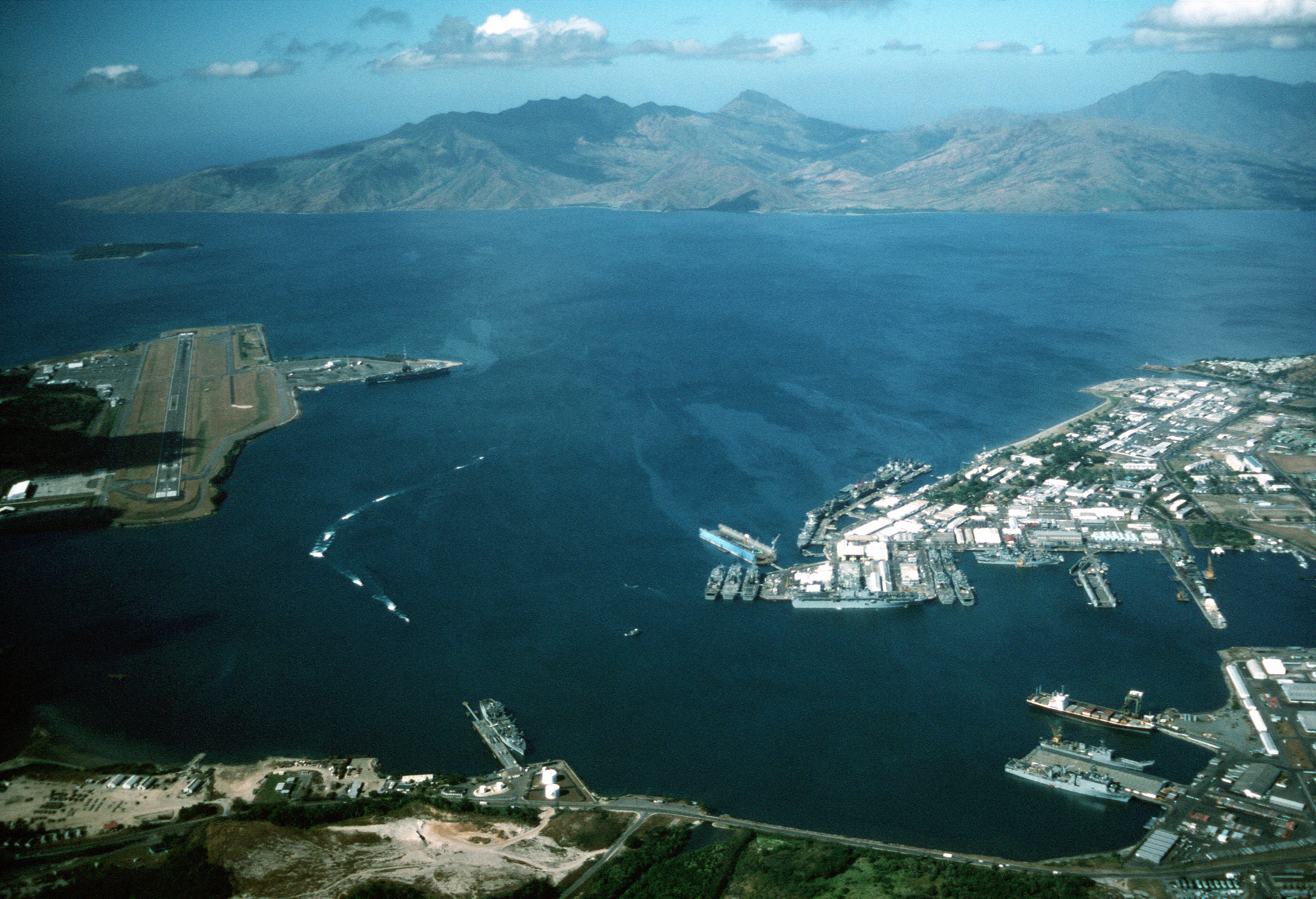
Naval Air Station Cubi Point left, U.S. Naval Base Subic Bay right. Seabees leveled a mountain that civilian contractors said could not be done. (USN)

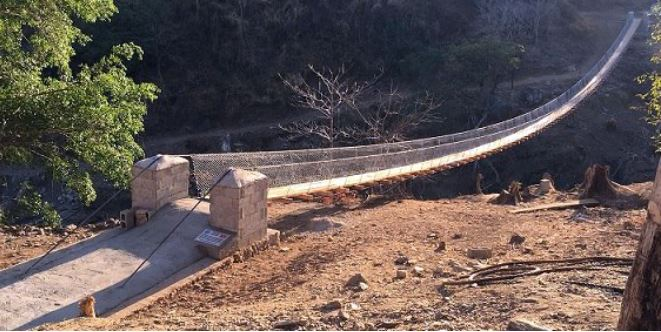
Suspension bridge built by NMCB 5 CCAD in Timor-Leste 2015 (Seabee Museum)

The outbreak of the Korean War led to a call-up of 10,000 from the Seabee Reserve. Seabees landed at Inchon during the assault, installing causeways dealing with enormous tides and enemy fire. Their actions there and elsewheres underscored the necessity of having CBs. During that war the authorized size of a CB was 550 men. When the truce was declared there was no CB demobilization as there had been at the end of World War II.

During the Korean War, the U.S. realized the need of an air station in the region. Cubi Point in the Philippines was selected. Civilian contractors were approached for bids. After seeing the Zambales Mountains and the maze of jungle, they claimed it could not be done. The Navy then turned to the Seabees. The first to arrive was CBD 1802 to do the surveying. MCB 3 arrived on 2 October 1951 to get the project going and was joined by MCB 5 in November. Over the next five years, MCBs 2, 7, 9, 11 and CBD 1803 all contributed to the effort. They leveled a mountain to make way for a nearly 2-mile-long (3.2 km) runway. NAS Cubi Point turned out to be one of the largest earth-moving projects in the world, equivalent to the construction of the Panama Canal. Seabees there moved 20 million cubic yards (15 million cubic metres) of dry fill plus another 15 million that was hydraulic fill. The $100 million facility ($1.2 billion in 2025 dollars) was commissioned on 25 July 1956, and comprised an air station and an adjacent pier that was capable of docking the Navy's largest carriers.

Seabee Teams The World War II precursor to Seabee teams was the PT Advance base Detachment of the 113th CB. Each man was cross-trained in at least three trades with some qualified as corpsmen and divers. During Vietnam the requirement of being skilled in three trades was continued. The first Seabees referred to as "Seabee Teams" were CBDs 1802 and 1803. They were followed by Detachments Able and Baker. The U.S. State Department learned of the teams and concluded they could have a Cold War purpose. They could be U.S. "Good Will Ambassadors" to third world countries to counter the spread of Communism, a military version of the Peace Corps. These 13-man teams would construct schools, drill wells or build clinics creating a positive image for the U.S. They were utilized by the United States Agency for International Development and were in S.E. Asia by the mid-1950s. Then in the early sixties, the U.S. Army Special Forces were being sent into rural areas of South Vietnam to develop a self-defense force to counter the Communist threat and making use of the Seabee teams at these same places made sense to the CIA. To start, twelve "Seabee teams, with Secret Clearances, were sent with the Army's Special Forces in the CIA funded Civilian Irregular Defense Group program (CIDG)" in the years 1963–1965. By 1965 the U.S. Army had enough engineers in theater to end Seabee involvement with Special Forces. At first teams were called Seabee Technical Assistance Teams (STAT) and were restricted to two in theater at a time. Teams after STAT 1104 were renamed Seabee Teams and by 1969 there were 17 in theater. As a military force Seabee Teams received many awards for heroism. Teams were sent to other nations as well. The Royal Thai government requested STATs in 1963 and ever since the Seabees have continued to deploy teams.

Construction Civic Action Details or CCAD CCADs or "See-Kads" are larger civic action units of 20–25 Seabees with the same purpose as Seabee Teams. The CCAD designation is not found in the record prior to 2013.

=== Camp David ===
Camp David is officially known as Naval Support Facility Thurmont, as it is technically a military installation. The base is staffed by the CEC, Seabees, and Marines. "In the early 1950s, Seabee BUs, UTs and CEs took over routine maintenance of the base and additional rates were added for administrative functions. Today Seabees still man the base public works and see that the grounds are in an impeccable condition." "Selectees undergo a single scope background investigation to determine if they qualify for a Top Secret Sensitive Yankee White (YW) clearance. All personnel in Presidential support activities are required a "Yankee White" security clearance. The tour lasts 36 months." When the base has a larger construction project a Construction Battalion from the fleet can be tasked. NMCBs 5 and 133 have drawn these assignments.

=== Antarctica: Science ===
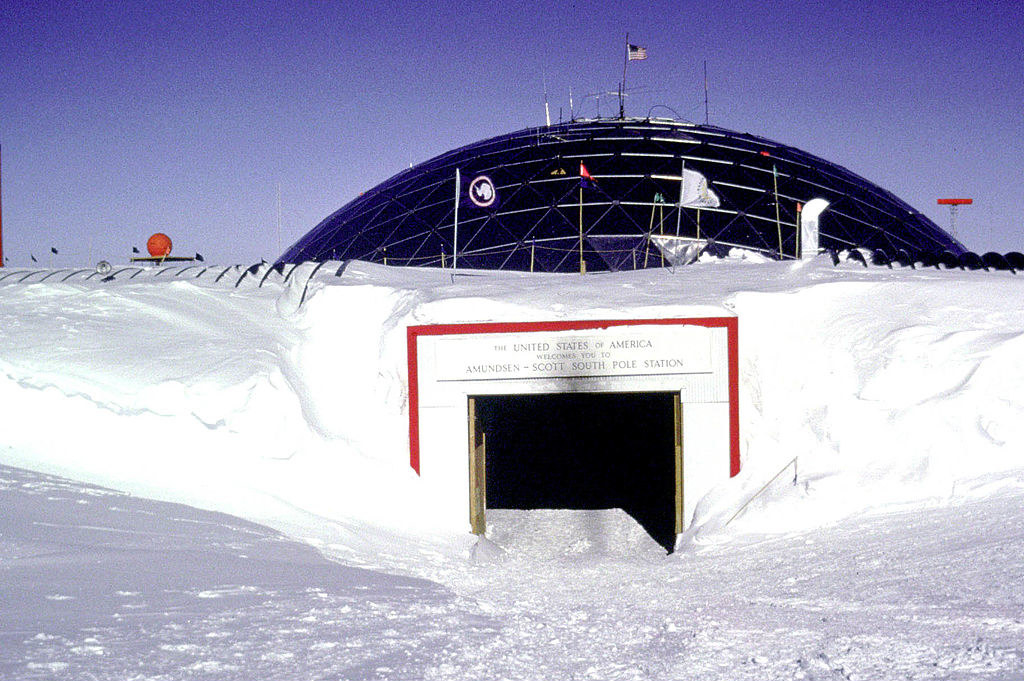
Amundsen-Scott South Pole Station, constructed by NMCB 71, dia. 165' x 54' height. In 2009-10 it was disassembled and sent to Port Hueneme.

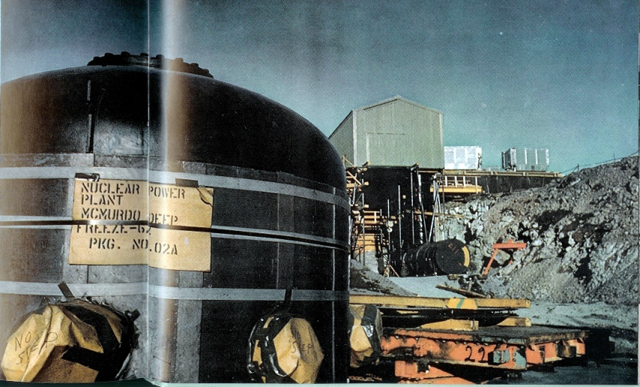
Tank for PM3a nuclear reactor built by MCB 1 at McMurdo Station

Operation Highjump

In December 1946, 166 Seabees sailed from Port Hueneme on the USS Yancey and USS Merrick assigned to Operation Highjump. They were part of Admiral Richard E. Byrd's Antarctic expedition. The U.S. Navy was in charge with "Classified" orders "to do all it could to establish a basis for a (U.S.) land claim in Antarctica". The Navy sent the Seabees to do the job starting with the construction of Little America (exploration base) IV as well as a runway for aerial mapping flights. This Operation was vastly larger than IGY Operation Deep Freeze that followed.

Operation Deep Freeze

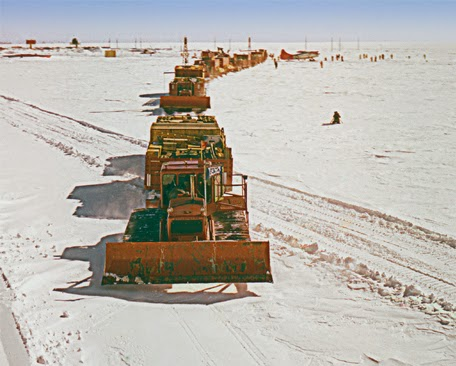
MCB 1 Sled train departing Little America for traverse to Byrd Station (646 miles) or the South Pole (850 miles). The Navy special ordered SD-LGP D8s (SD=stretched dozer, LGP=low ground pressure) with the frames extended 4 feet and tracks 54 inches wide resulting in a ground pressure of 4.30 psi and blades 18.5 feet wide. There were two types of sleds: 10 ton or 20 ton that could be hitched in multiples. (U.S. Navy).

In 1955, Seabees were assigned to Operation Deep Freeze making Antarctica an annual deployment site. Their task was the construction and maintenance of scientific bases for the National Science Foundation. The first "wintering over" crew included 200 Seabees. They cleared an 6,000-foot (1,800 m) ice runway at Mcmurdo for the advance party of Deep Freeze II to fly to South Pole Station. MCB 1 was assigned for Deep Freeze II.

Antarctica added to the Seabee's list of accomplishments:

- Tractor train traverses covering hundreds of miles.
- Bases built: McMurdo Station, South Pole Station, Byrd Station, Palmer Station, Siple Station, Ellsworth Station, Brockton Station, Eights Station, Plateau Station, Hallett Station, and Little America IV and Little America V
- MCB 1s construction of a nuclear power plant which got them a Navy Unit Commendation.
- NMCB 71s construction of a Buckminster Fuller Geodesic dome at So. Pole Station. It became a symbolic icon of the United States Antarctic Research Program (USARP).

=== Vietnam War ===
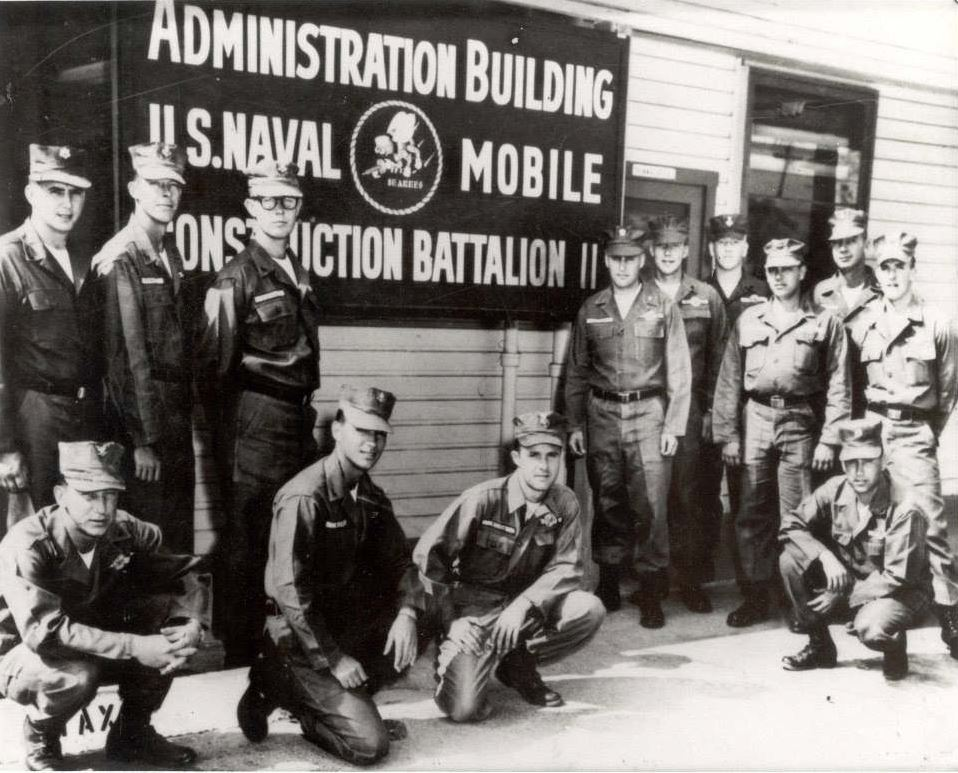
STAT 1104 in Port Hueneme L-R standing: John Klepher, Dale Brakken, William Hoover KIA, Ltjg Peterlin, Cmdr L.W.Eyman, Douglas Mattick, James Keenan, J.R. McCully, Marvin Shields KIA, kneeling: Richard Supczak, F.J. Alexander Jr, James Wilson, Jack Allen. For their actions in the Battle of Dong Xoai, STAT 1104 received a Navy Unit Commendation a Medal of Honor, 2 Silver Stars, 6 Bronze Stars with Vs and 9 purple hearts. (USN)

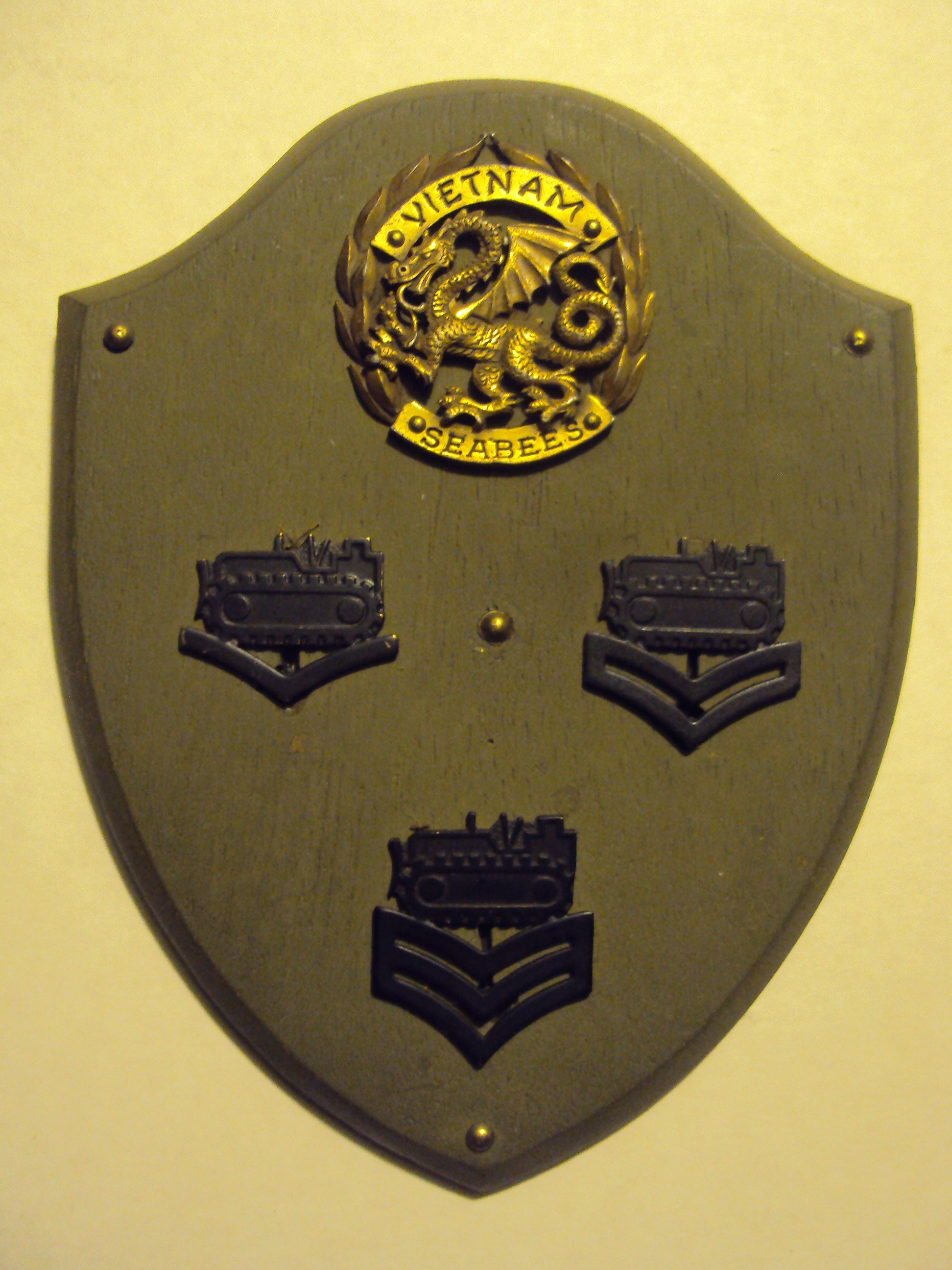
Vietnam era EO3 – EO1 collar devices

Seabees were in Vietnam twice in the 1950s. First in June 1954, as elements of Operation Passage to Freedom and then two years later to survey and map the roads. Seabee teams 501 and 502 arrived January 1963 as the first Seabees of the Vietnam War. They went to Dam Pau and Tri Ton to build Special Forces camps. In 1964 small 14 man Seabee groups were tasked to the U.S. Army advisors in the Special Operations Group. ACB 1 was the first CB in the theater that year. In 1965 the Marines arrived, making an amphibious landing at Chu Lai, with Seabees attached. Entire Naval Construction Regiments followed. Seabees supported the Marines at Khe Sanh and Chu Lai combat bases. The U.S. had many civilian contractors in the country, however the Seabee construction included numerous aircraft-support facilities, roads, and bridges. For every mile of road they improved, they built 100' of bridge-deck. They also worked civic action projects throughout the country. In June 1965, Construction Mechanic 3rd Class Marvin G. Shields of Seabee Team 1104 was at the Battle of Dong Xoai. He was posthumously awarded the Medal of Honor and is the only Seabee to receive the award. Seabee Teams were part of a propaganda program to promote support for the RVN through positive community engagement, typically building schools, clinics, or drilling wells. In 1966, Seabees repaired the airfield at Khe Sahn covering an area of 3,900'x60' with aluminum matting in four days. General Westmoreland "called it one of the most outstanding military engineering feats of the war." MCB 4 had a det at Con Thien whose actions were a near repeat of Dong Xoai.

In 1968, the Marine Corps requested that the Navy make a change. The Marines were using "MCB" for "Marine Corps Base" while the Navy was using "MCB" for "Mobile Construction Battalion", it was causing confusion in logistics. The Navy agreed and added "Naval" to MCB creating the NMCBs that now exist. During that year the 30th NCR had five battalions in the Da Nang area and two at Chu Lai. The 32nd NCR had three battalions tasked near Phu Bai and one at Dong Ha. In May 1968 two reserve battalions RNMCB 12 and 22 were activated, bring the total number of battalions in Vietnam to 21. Both ACBs were in theater as well as CBMUs 301 and 302. In 1968, NMCB 10 drew an atypical Seabee "task" supporting the 101st Airborne. It happened again in 1969 when CBs 10, 40 and 121 sent EOs to Fire base Fury. During 1969 the number of Seabees in theater reached 29,000, from there their draw-down began. The last battalion withdrew late 1971 with the last Seabee teams out a year later. When it was over they had sent 137 Seabee teams, built 15 CB camps, and deployed 22 battalions. CBMU 302 became the largest CB ever at over 1400 men and was homeported at Cam Rahn Bay. On 23 April 1975 it was announced that U.S. involvement in Vietnam was over. That day CB 4 started construction of a temporary camp for Operation New Life on Guam. In seven days 2,000 squad tents were erected and numbered 3,500 when done.

During Vietnam the Seabees had a few uniform variations. One was the stenciling of unit numbers across the back of the field jacket M-65. Another was the collar and cover devices for enlisted E4-E6. The Navy authorized that the "crow" be replaced by the rating insignia of each trade. Nametags were another, they started out white with a multicolored seabee. In 1968, the USMC OD green pattern was copied. The NAVCATs became the only Seabees to ever be authorized to wear a shoulder patch.

NAVCATs Naval Construction Action Teams

CBMU 302 had 23 NAVCATS(Naval Construction Action Teams) total with 15 the most active at one time. Teams were numbered 1-23. They were Vice Admiral Elmo Zumwalt's expansion of the Seabee Team concept. He submitted it in November 1968 to General Creighton Abrams commander of Military Assistance Command, Vietnam.

Agent Orange Many Seabees were exposed to the defoliant herbicide while in Vietnam. NCBC Gulfport was the largest storage depot in the United States for Agent Orange. From there it was shipped to Vietnam. In 1968, the NCBC received 68,000 barrels to forward. Long term barrel storage began in 1969. That lasted until 1977. The site covered 30 acres and was still being cleaned up in 2013.

=== Space race: NASA/Tektite I ===
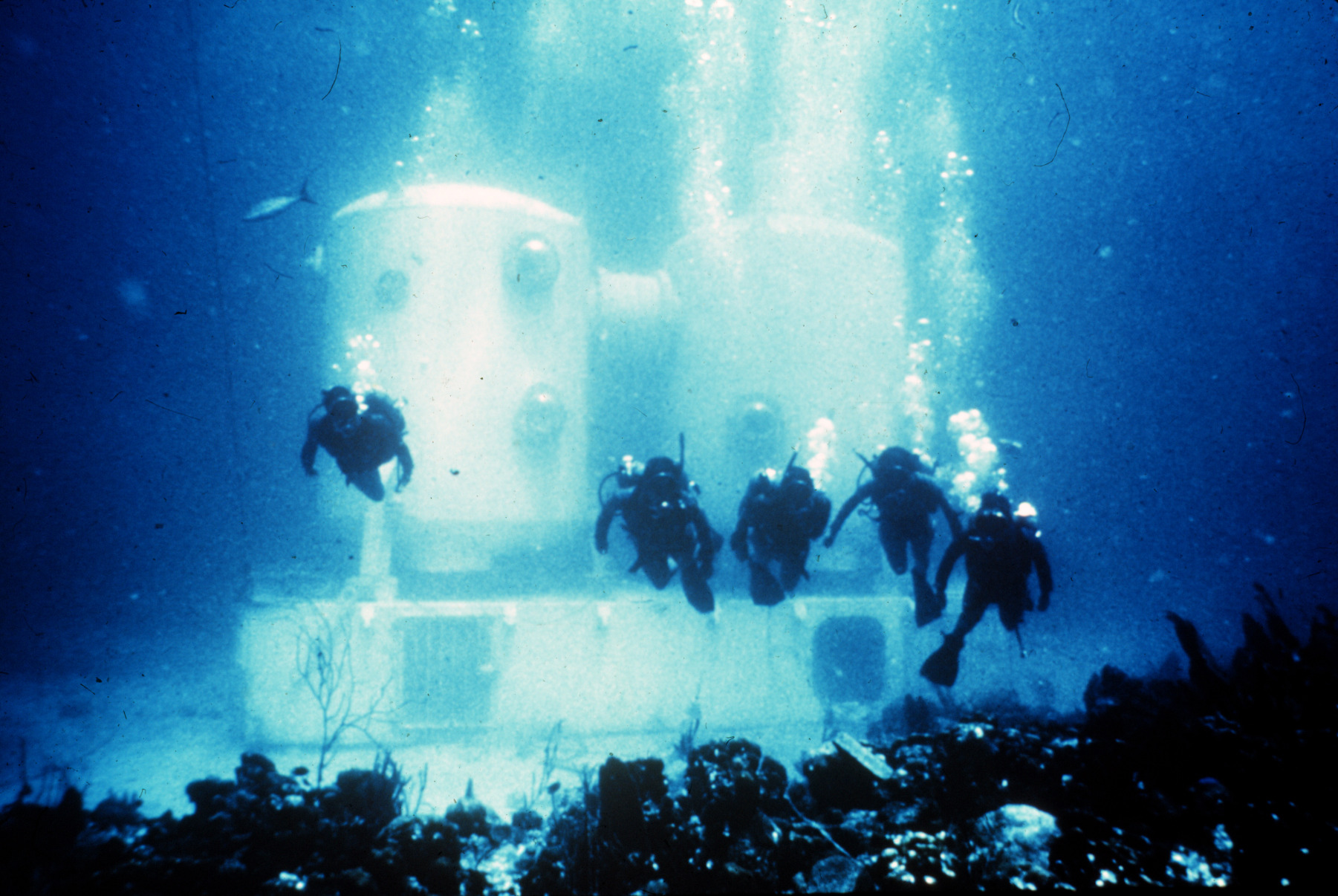
Tektite I assembled by ACB 2

In 1960, a MCB 10 detachment built a Project Mercury telemetry and ground instrumentation station on Canton island.

On 28 January 1969 a detachment of 50 men from Amphibious Construction Battalion 2 plus 17 Seabee divers began installation of the Tektite habitat in Great Lameshur Bay at Lameshur, U.S. Virgin Islands. The Tektite program was funded by NASA and was the first scientists-in-the-sea program sponsored by the U.S. government. The Seabees also constructed a 12-hut base camp at Viers that is used today as the Virgin Islands Environmental Resource Station. The project was a by product of the Space Race. It caused the U.S. Navy to realize the need for a permanent Underwater Construction capability that led to the formation the Seabee Underwater Construction Teams".

At present NASA is working on the Moon to Mars program. In 2015, ACB 1 was involved in moving the Orion's Boilerplate Test Article (BTA). ACB 1 was tasked in August 2019 in a test recovery exercise of the Orion spacecraft. ACB 2 was put through the same task a year later in August 2020.

=== CIA and Naval Intelligence/Communication support ===
- After the Seabees left Camp Peary the CIA moved into the base and now refer to it as "the Farm".
- During World War II NAS Tanapag, Saipan was a "major propaganda site of the Office of War Information" (OWI). In 1947, CBD 1510 began maintaining NAS Tanapag for the NTTU (Naval Technical Training Unit). In 1948, CBD 1510's men were transferred to CBD 1504 when it was replacing CB 121 as island Public Works. That year the CIA created the NTTU as a "cover" and made access highly restricted to the base. The CIA station had Capitol Hill constructed to administer its operations at a cost of $28 million. The station covered the northern half of Saipan including, Kagman Field, Marpi Point Field, and the four radio towers. "Brig. Gen. Edward G. Lansdale, Pentagon expert on guerrilla warfare, shared with Gen. Maxwell D. Taylor, President Kennedy's military adviser, on "Resources for Unconventional Warfare in SE. Asia."....that the "CIA maintains a field training station on the island of Saipan ... the installation is under Navy cover and is known as the Naval Technical Training Unit. The primary mission of the Saipan Training Station is to provide physical facilities and competent instructor personnel to fulfill a variety of training requirements including intelligence tradecraft, communications, counter-intelligence and psychological warfare techniques. Training is performed in support of CIA activities conducted throughout the Far East area." The Seabees cease listing the Public Works assignments at NAS Tanapag in 1953 while the CIA remained until 1962. However, MCB 9 deployed to Saipan in 1954 with one of their projects being the up-grading of the Public Works shops. MCB 10 Det Bravo deployed to Saipan from July 1957 until February 1958 with projects unlisted.

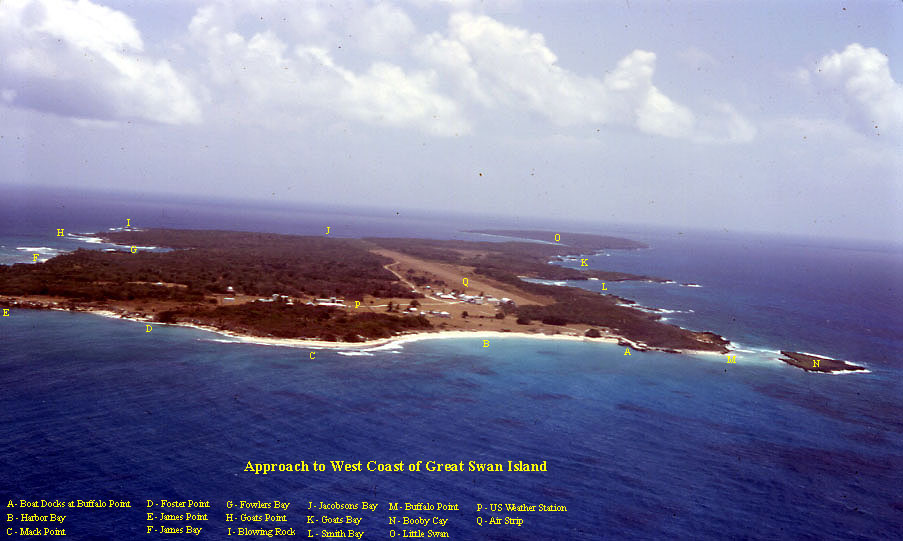
CIA runway by MCB 6 Det Alfa on Swan Island

- A year before the Bay of pigs and Cuban Missile Crisis the CIA took a "top secret" urgent/immediate project to the Seabees. The agency wanted two 220' radio towers with a supporting airstrip, dock, and quonsets erected on Swan Island, built asap, with no construction plans for the Seabees. The station would be independent-self sufficient. Det Tango of MCB 6 was given the project. LSTs 1046 and 1056 delivered men and materials from CBC Quonset Point. The Seabees had the CIA's "Radio Swan" on the air in short order.

Naval Intelligence: NAVFACs

The Navy built 22 Naval Facilities (NAVFACs) for its Sound Surveillance System (SOSUS) to track Soviet submarines. They were in service 1954–79 with Seabees staffing all the Public works. In the 1980s the number of tracking stations was halved with the advent of the Integrated Underwater Surveillance System (IUSS). The NAVFACs were decommissioned by further advances in technology, the end of the Cold War and disclosures by John Walker to the Soviets.

The Seabees have also been tasked building Naval Communication facilities. One at Nea Makri Greece was built by MCB 6 in 1962 and upgraded by NMCB 133. Naval Comm Station Sidi Yahya was first built in World War II another is NavCommSta Guam. It started out on the island as the Joint Communications Agency (JCA) in 1945.

=== Naval Support Unit: Department of State/Embassy security ===
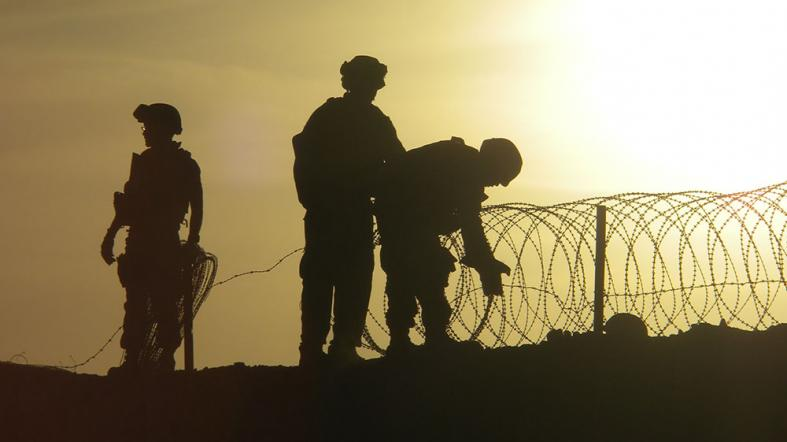
Naval Support Unit Seabees securing a diplomatic compound in Dec. 2010. (Dept. of State)

In 1964, at the height of the Cold War, Seabees were assigned to the State Department because listening devices were found in the Embassy of the United States in Moscow. Those initial Seabees were "Naval Mobile Construction Battalion FOUR, Detachment November". The U.S. had just constructed a new embassy in Warsaw. After what had been found in Moscow Seabees were dispatched and found many "bugs" there also. This led to the creation of the Naval Support Unit in 1966 as well as the decision to make it permanent two years later. That year William Darrah, a Seabee of the support unit, is credited with saving the U.S. Embassy in Prague, Czechoslovakia from a potentially disastrous fire. In 1986, "as a result of reciprocal expulsions ordered by Washington and Moscow" Seabees were sent to "Moscow and Leningrad to help keep the embassy and the consulate functioning".

The Support Unit has a limited number of special billets for select NCOs, E-5 and above. These Seabees are assigned to the Department of State and attached to Diplomatic Security. Those chosen can be assigned to the Regional Security Officer of a specific embassy or be part of a team traveling from one embassy to the next. Duties include the installation of alarm systems, CCTV cameras, electromagnetic locks, safes, vehicle barriers, and securing compounds. They can also assist with the security engineering in sweeping embassies (electronic counter-intelligence). They are tasked with new construction or renovations in security sensitive areas and supervise private contractors in non-sensitive areas. Due to Diplomatic protocol the Support Unit is required to wear civilian clothes most of the time they are on duty and receive a supplemental clothing allowance for this. The information regarding this assignment is very scant, but State Department records in 1985 indicate department security had 800 employees, plus 1,200 Marines and 115 Seabees. That Seabee number is roughly the same today.

=== Cold War winds down ===
As the Cold War wound down, new challenges and changes came for the Seabees starting with the increased incidence of terrorism. This was in addition to ongoing Seabee support missions for USN/USMC bases worldwide. Cold War Facilities still required support, like the Polaris and Poseidon submarines at Holy Loch, Rota. In 1971, the Seabees began the huge project on Diego Garcia in the Indian Ocean. It was completed in 1987 at a cost of $200 million. With the extended construction timeline, it is difficult to inflation-adjust that cost into today's dollars. The complex accommodates the Navy's largest ships and cargo planes. The base served as a staging facility for Operations Desert Shield and Desert Storm. Additionally, Seabees were also tasked upgrading and expanding Naval Air Station Sigonella, Sicily for the United States Sixth Fleet.

In 1983, a truck bomb demolished the Marine's barracks in Beirut, Lebanon. From the Beirut International Airport Druze militia artillery harassed the Marines. NMCB-1 was in Rota and sent its AirDet to construct bunkers for the Marines. EO2 Kirt May became the first Seabee post-Vietnam to receive a Purple Heart while on this mission.

CN Carmella Jones became the first female Seabee when she cross-rated to Equipment Operator during the summer of 1972.

== International terrorism ==
The Cold war did not end until 1991 and 9/11 was further off yet, but SW2 Robert Stethem was executed by the Lebanese Shia militia Hezbollah when they hijacked TWA Flight 847 in 1985. Stethem was a diver in UCT 1. The Navy named USS Stethem (DDG-63) in his honor. On 24 August 2010, during a shipboard ceremony, Stethem was posthumously honored to the rank of Master Chief Constructionman (CUCM) by the Master Chief Petty Officer of the Navy and given the Prisoner of War Medal.

=== Persian Gulf War ===
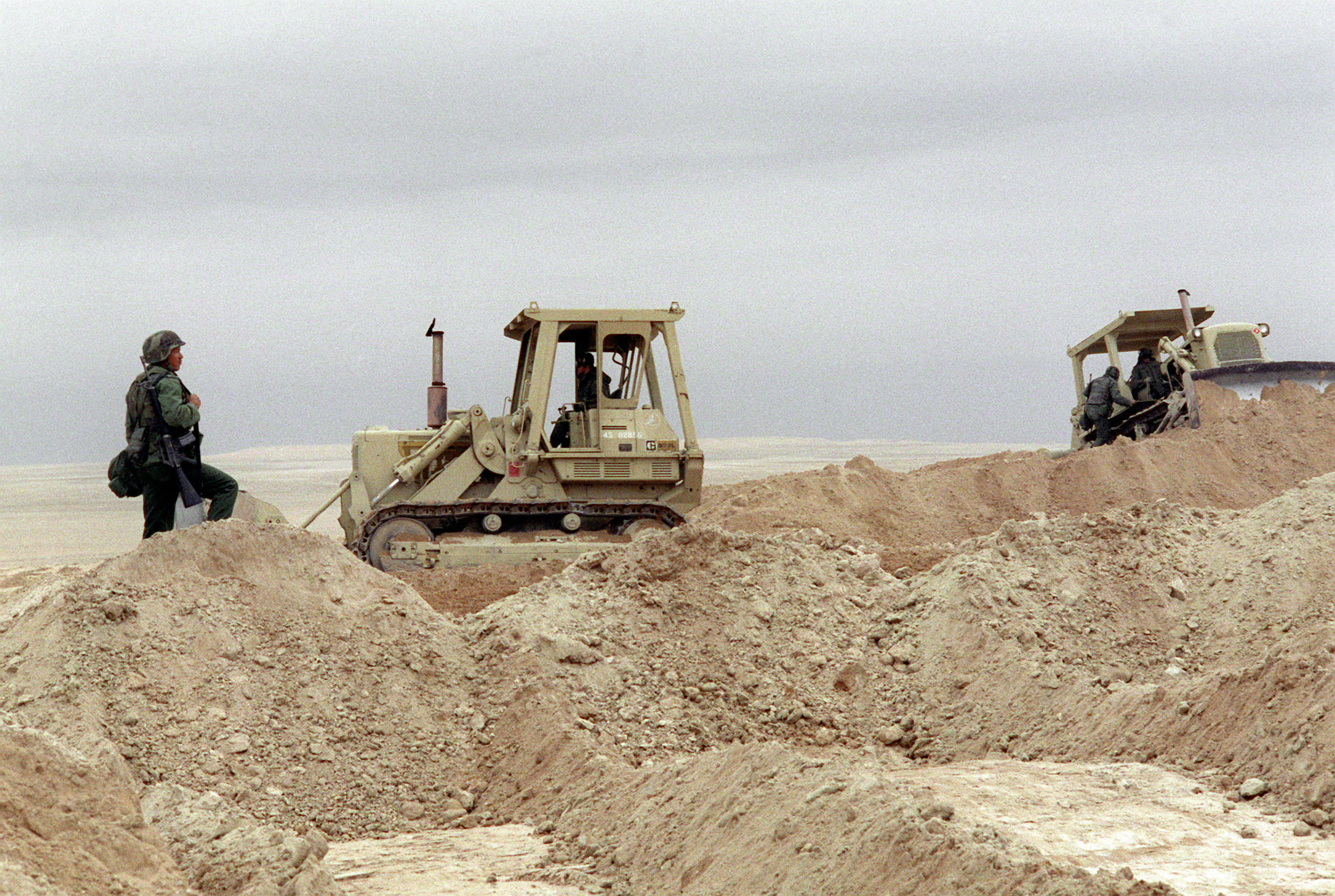
Seabees do base site prep during Operation Desert Storm.

Over 5,000 Seabees served in the Gulf War. In August 1990 the 1st Marine Expeditionary Force (I MEF) was assigned NMCBs 4, 5, 7, and 40. The first Seabees in theater were a Det from ABC 1, followed by a Det from ACB 2 and then CBUs 411 and 415. Mid September Air-Dets from the four battalions deployed to construct air fields for Marine Air Groups (MAG) 11, 13, 16, and 25 of the 3rd Marine Air Wing. NMCB 7 was the first Battalion to arrive. Camp Nomad was a NMBC-74 project at Ras Al Mishab for MAG 26. Camps were constructed for both the 1st and 2nd Marine Divisions as well as Hq complexes for MEF I and II. In Saudi Arabia, Seabees built numerous camps, galleys, runways, aprons, helo zones, plus two 500-bed Fleet Hospitals near Al-Jubayl. The 3rd NCR was activated to provide a command echelon. NMCBs 24 and 74 also deployed in support of the Marines.

=== Iraq, Afghanistan, and the war on terrorism ===
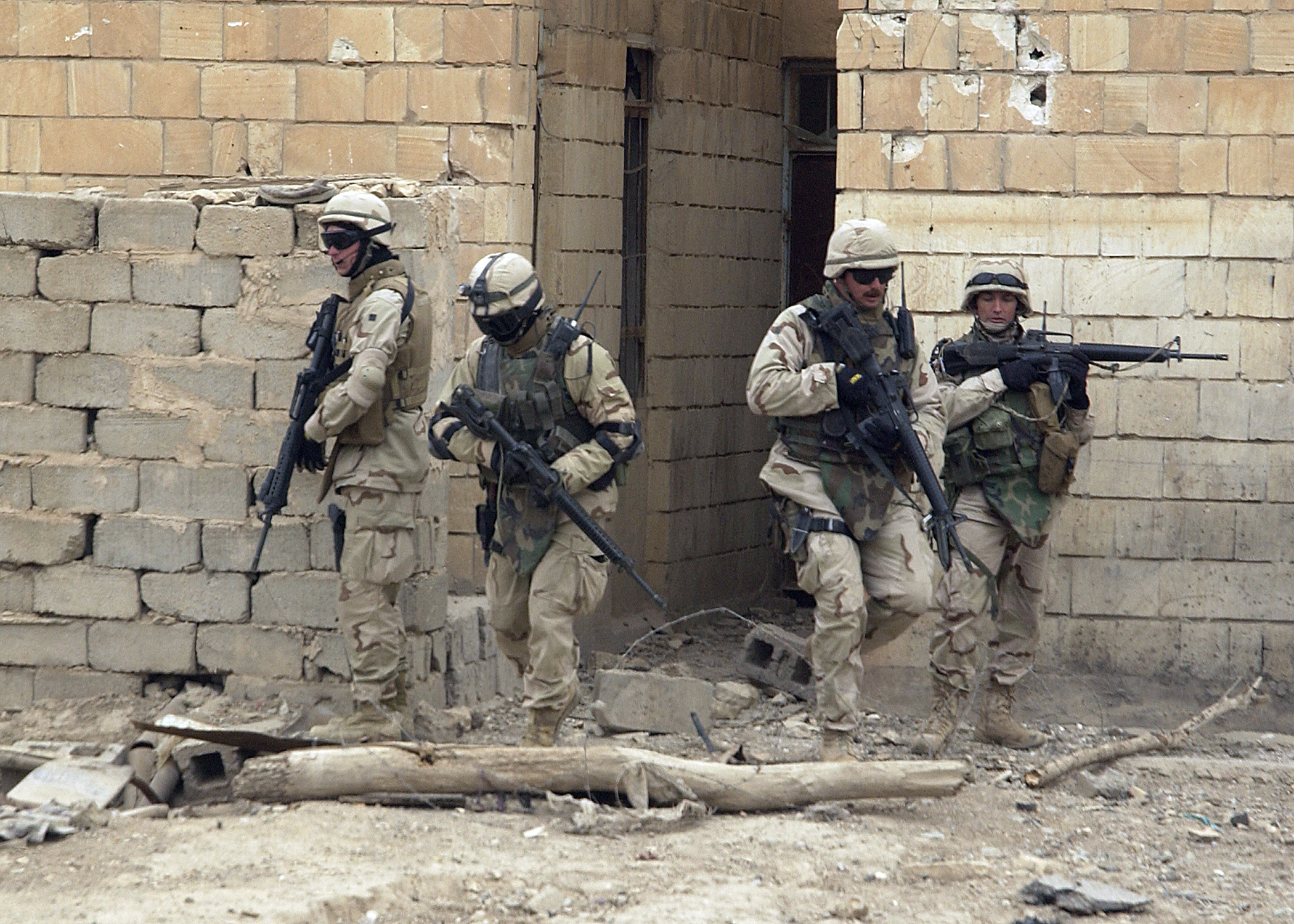
Seabees from (NMCB-23), secure a severely damaged school in Fallujah, Iraq

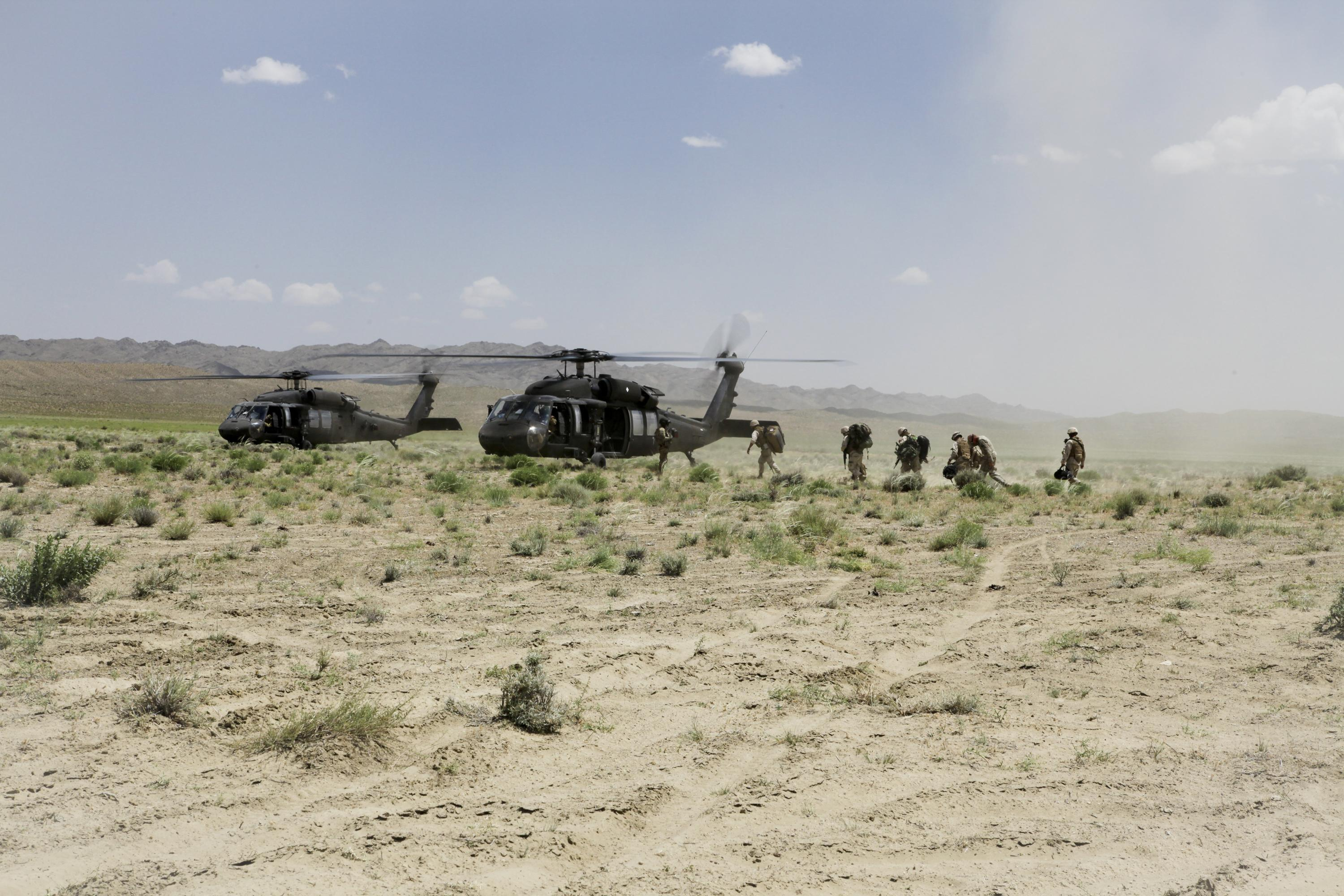
Navy Seabees, assigned to (NMCB-26) board UH-60 Black Hawk helicopters during Operation Karsha Pa Rago Kee in Afghanistan.

Seabees deployed in both initial invasions of the Afghanistan War and Iraq War. All active and reserve NMCBs and NCRs were deployed to building to work on civil infrastructure. One of the most visible tasks assigned to the NCF was the removal of statues of Saddam Hussein in Baghdad.

In Afghanistan, the Seabees' main task was the construction of multiple forward operating bases. NMCB 133 deployed to FOB Camp Rhino and help build Kandahar Airfield where a detention facility was constructed as well.

Since 2002, Seabees have provided civic action support in the Philippines, most notably near Abu Sayyaf's jungle training area in the southern Philippines. Seabees work with Army, Marines, and Air Force under the Joint Special Operations Task Force - Philippines.

Seabees have supported the war on terrorism ever since the invasion with numerous deployments over the years.

== Disaster relief and recovery ==
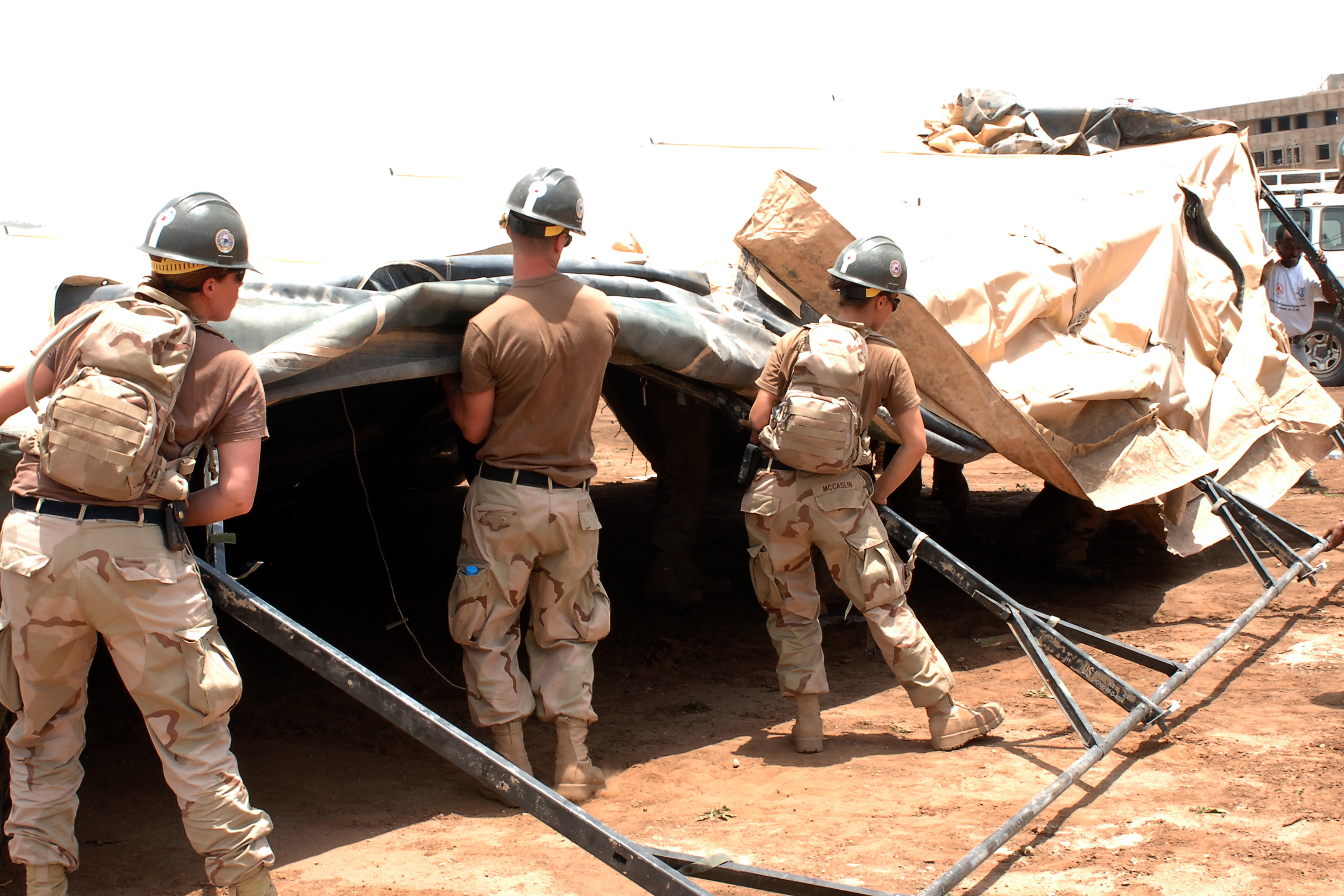
NMCB 5 attached to Combined Joint Task Force – Horn of Africa set tents for displaced flood victims in Ethiopia. (2006)

- Hurricane Camille hit NCBC Gulfport, Mississippi, NMCB-121 was in homeport and was tasked with base cleanup, rescue, and community outreach.
- Cyclone Ofa in 1990 NMCB 133 sent a det to American Samoa to aid the recovery.
- 1994 Northridge earthquake, Seabees supported the disaster recovery.
- Hurricane Andrew in 1992, Seabees provided disaster recovery to Homestead, Florida.
- Operation Restore Hope In 1992–1993 two battalions were sent for the humanitarian efforts in Somalia.
- Operation Sea Signal 1994 Seabees provided assistance to the Haitian Relief effort at Guantanamo Bay Naval Base.
- Operation Joint Endeavor In Dec. 1995, Seabees were in Croatia supporting the peacekeeping in Sarajevo, Bosnia and Herzegovina. NMCB 40 was tasked to the U.S. Army 1st Infantry Div. for dismantling FOBs during the IFOR/SFOR phase.
- Hurricane Georges Seabees deployed to the Caribbean with damage assessment teams, generators and water trucks providing disaster relief.
- Hurricane Mitch 1998 Seabees deployed to Honduras with Joint Task Force Bravo. They did road and bridge repair, debris cleanup, and erected camps. For NMCB 7, it was on their second humanitarian mission of the deployment.
- Hurricane Ivan NMCBs 1 & 74 deployed in September 2004 to the repair Naval Air Station Pensacola. They cleared debris, repaired roads, erected tents, and provided general support.
- Typhoon Nanmadol (2004) NMCB 7 provided disaster relief.
- 2004 Indian Ocean earthquake and tsunami NMCBs 7, 40, and UCT 2 provided disaster relief.
- Joint Task Force Katrina 2005. Seabees from NMCBs 1, 7, 18, 40 and 133 plus ACB 2 and CBMUs 202 and 303 and UCT 1 were tasked the reconstruction of CBC Gulfport and the recovery of the Gulf Coast
- 2010 Haiti earthquake NMCB 7 provided construction support and disaster relief with UCT 1, ACB-2 and Army Engineers.
- April 2011 Miyagi earthquake Seabees from NMCB-133 and UCT 2 deployed to Japan as part of the relief effort.
- Hurricane Sandy NMCB 11 Air Det deployed to support disaster recovery in New Jersey and New York. NMCB 5 assisted disaster relief throughout the Sandy Hook area.

== Naval Construction Force (NCF) ==
At present, there are six active-duty Naval Mobile Construction Battalions (NMCBs) in the United States Navy, split between the Pacific Fleet and the Atlantic Fleet.

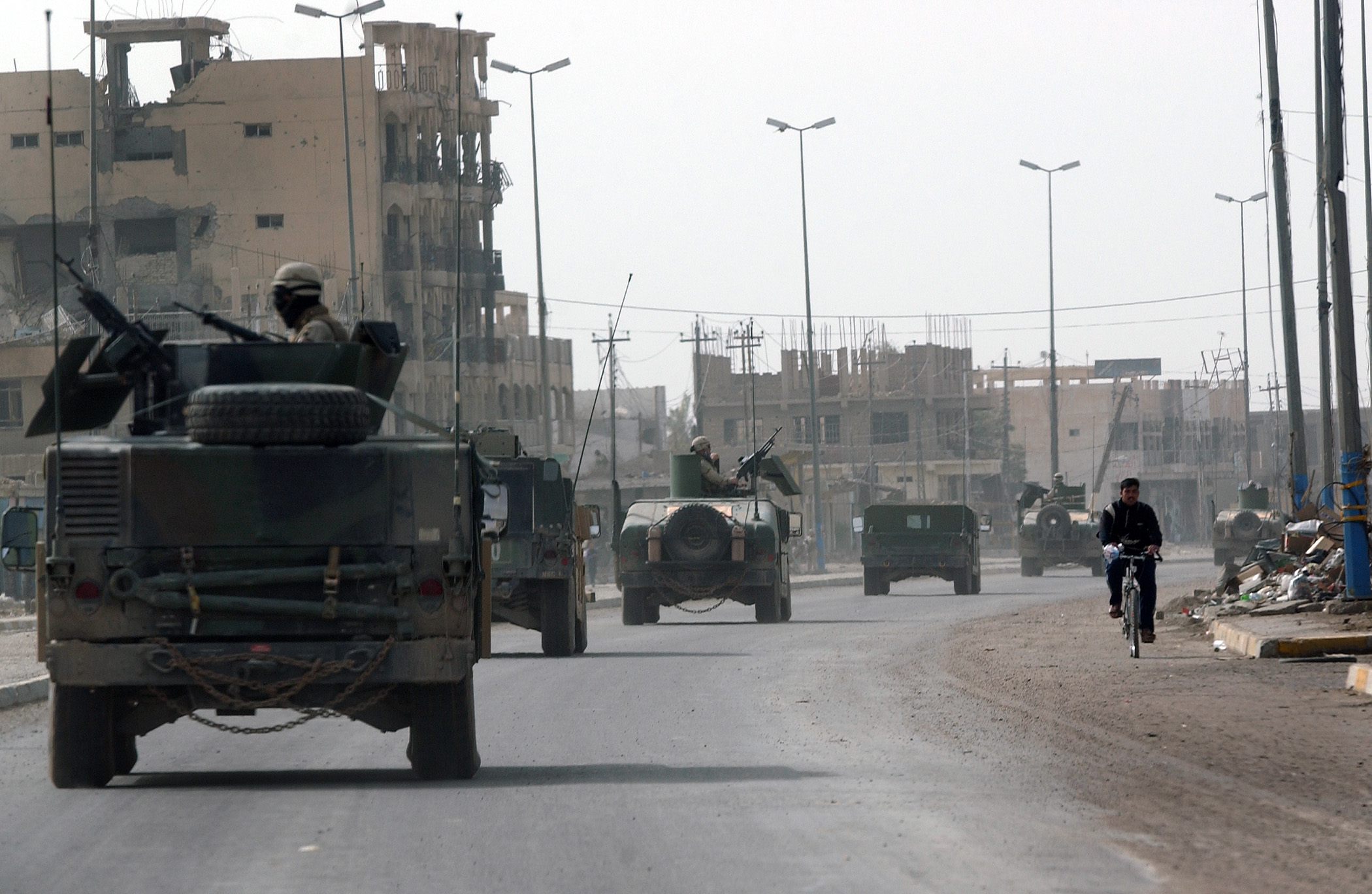
Naval Mobile Construction Battalion Twenty Three (NMCB 23) patrol the streets of Fallujah, Iraq.

30th Naval Construction Regiment is located on Guam. Naval Construction Battalion Center Port Hueneme, CA is homeport to the Regiment's battalions.

- Naval Mobile Construction Battalion 3
- Naval Mobile Construction Battalion 4
- Naval Mobile Construction Battalion 5

22nd Naval Construction Regiment is stationed at Naval Construction Battalion Center (Gulfport, Mississippi) the homeport to the Atlantic fleet CBs.

- Naval Mobile Construction Battalion 1
- Naval Mobile Construction Battalion 11
- Naval Mobile Construction Battalion 133

NCF Reserve From the 1960s through 1991, reserve battalions were designated as "Reserve Naval Mobile Construction Battalions" (RNMCBs). After 1991 "Reserve" was dropped with the integration of reserve units within the NCF making all battalions NMCBs

- Naval Mobile Construction Battalion 14, HQ Gulfport, MS. detachments in five states and Puerto Rico.
- Naval Mobile Construction Battalion 18, HQ Port Hueneme, CA., detachments in six states and Guam.
- Naval Mobile Construction Battalion 22, HQ Port Hueneme, CA. detachments in five states.
- Naval Mobile Construction Battalion 25, HQ Port Hueneme, CA. detachments in six states.
- Naval Mobile Construction Battalion 27, HQ Gulfport, MS. detachments in seven states.

Detachment: A construction crew that is "detached" from the battalion's "main body" deployment site. The size is determined by the project scale and timeline.

Battalion: The battalion is the basic NCF unit with a HQ Company plus four Construction Companies: A, B, C, & D. CBs are organized to function as independent self sufficient units.

Regiment: Naval Construction Regiments (NCRs) provide a higher echelon command to three or four CBs operating on close proximity.

Naval Construction Groups 1 and 2: In 2013, Seabee Readiness Groups (SRGs) were decommissioned, and re-organized as NCG-1 and NCG-2. They are regimental-level command groups tasked with administrative and operational control of CBs, as well as conducting pre deployment training for all assigned units. NCG-2 is based at CBC Gulfport while NCG-1 is at CBC Port Hueneme.

Seabee Engineer Reconnaissance Team (SERTs)

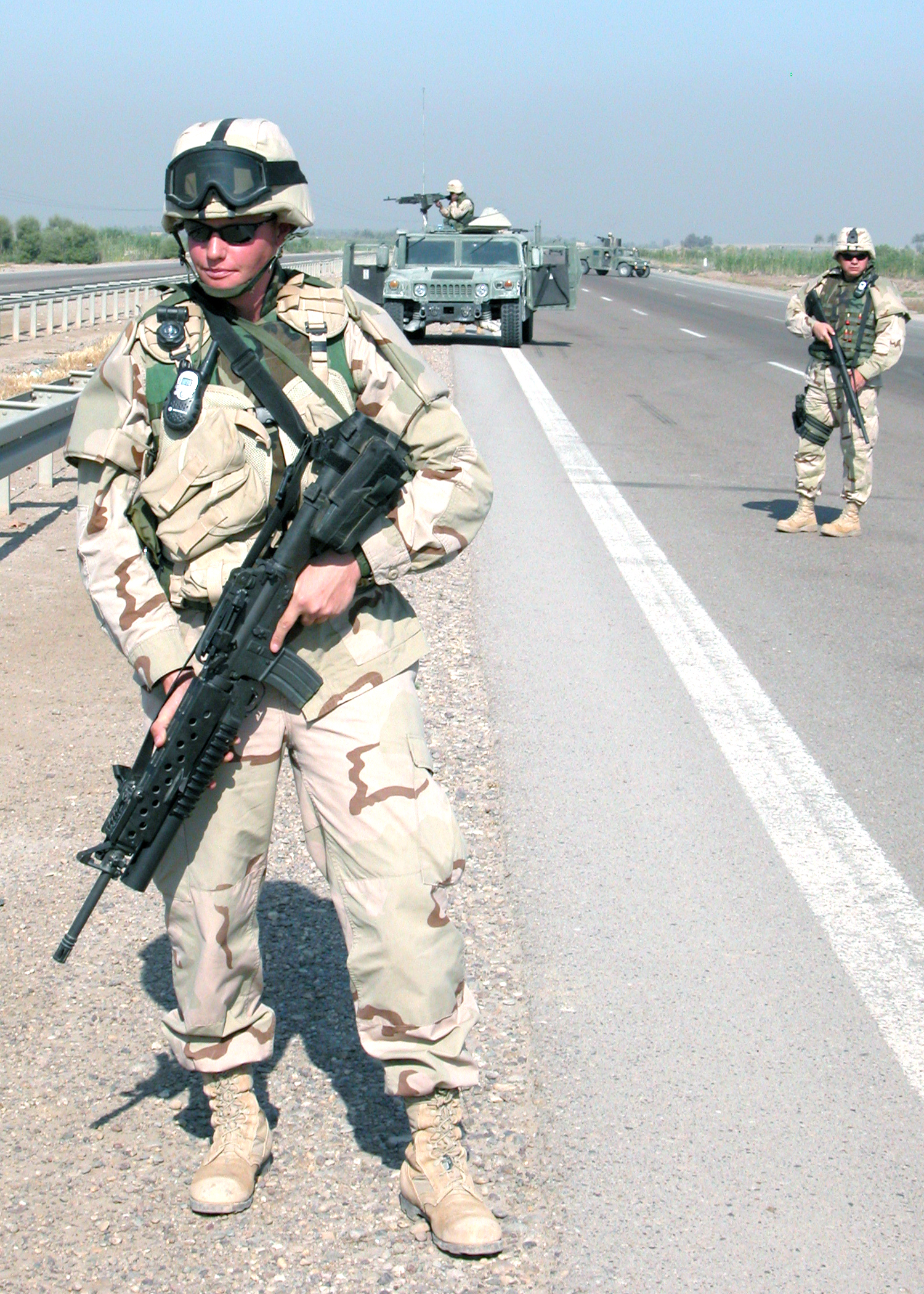
NMCB-74's Seabee Engineer Reconnaissance Team, secure a sector of a highway after sighting an Improvised Explosive Device (IED) while deployed in central Iraq in support of Operation Iraqi Freedom (OIF).

SERTs are the Special operations capable element of the NCF developed by the First Naval Construction Division (1st NCD) in Operation Iraqi Freedom. They are intended to provide engineering assessments in the field in support of the United States Marine Corps Reconnaissance Battalions. A team has two CEC officers and eight enlisted Seabees, augmented by additional personnel as needed. A team has three elements: liaison, security, and reconnaissance. The liaison (LNO) element has an officer and two communications specialists responsible for communicating the assessments and intelligence. Reconnaissance has the other officer, who is the Officer-in-Charge (OIC), a BU or SW cpo with bridge construction experience. The team has a corpsman or medically trained member, the remainder are selected for being the most qualified in their trade. All are required to have the Seabee Warfare pin. In 2013, 1st Naval Construction Division along with SERT's were decommissioned. Today, UCTs performance demonstrate the SERT concept for NECC.

== Seabees outside the NCF ==
Amphibious Construction Battalions (PHIBCBs)

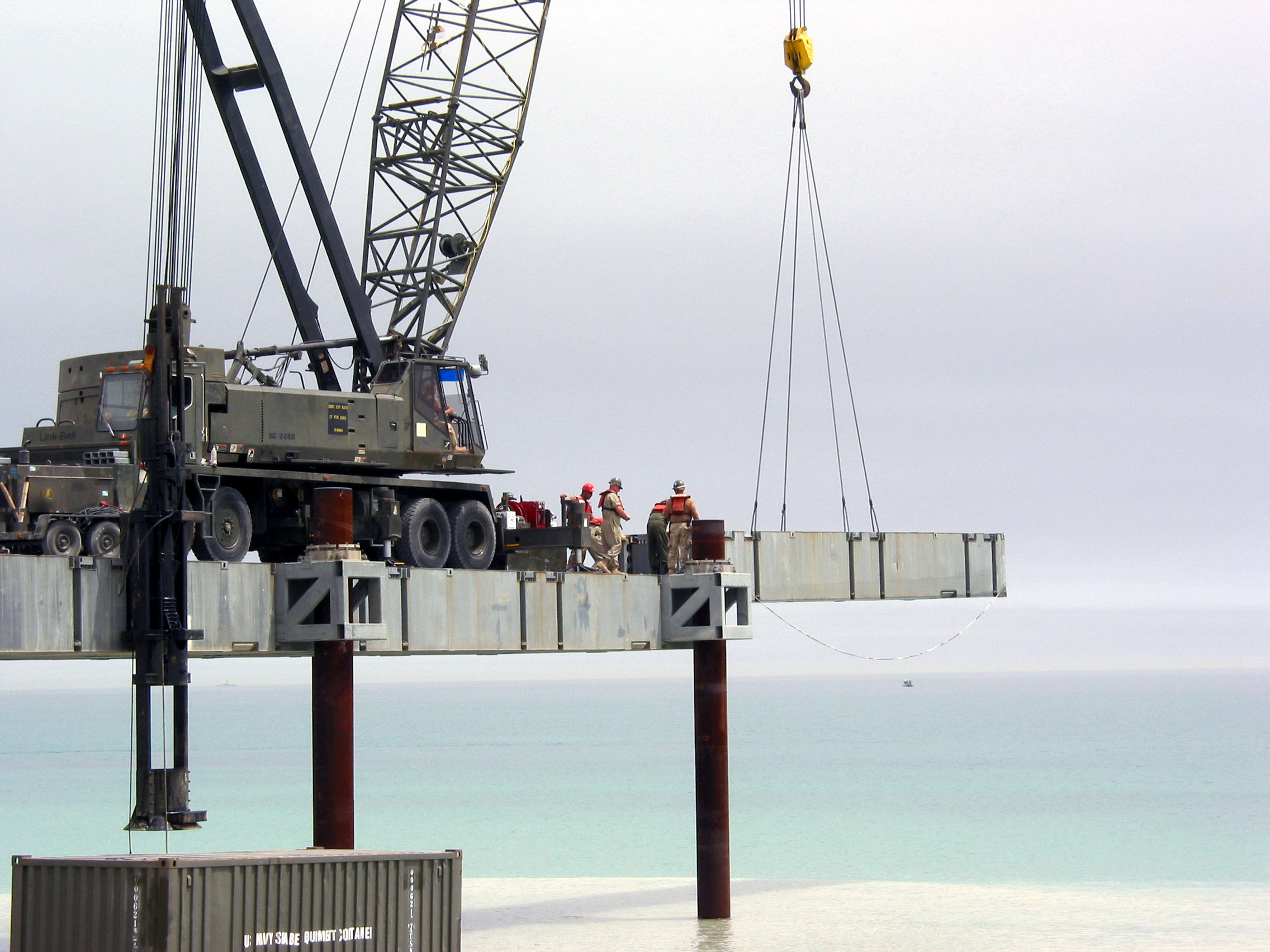
US Navy 030404-N-1050K-023U.S. Seabees from ACBs 1 and 2 place a deck section in the assembly of the Elevated Causeway System-Modular (ELCAS (M)) at Camp Patriot, Kuwait (Apr 2003).

ACBs (or PHIBCB) were preceded by the pontoon assembly CBs formed during World War II. On 31 October 1950, MCBs 104 and 105 were re-designated ACB 1 and ACB 2, and assigned to Naval Beach Groups. ACBs report to surface TYCOMs. Additionally, in an ACB half the enlisted are a construction rate while the other half are fleet.

Construction Battalion Maintenance Units

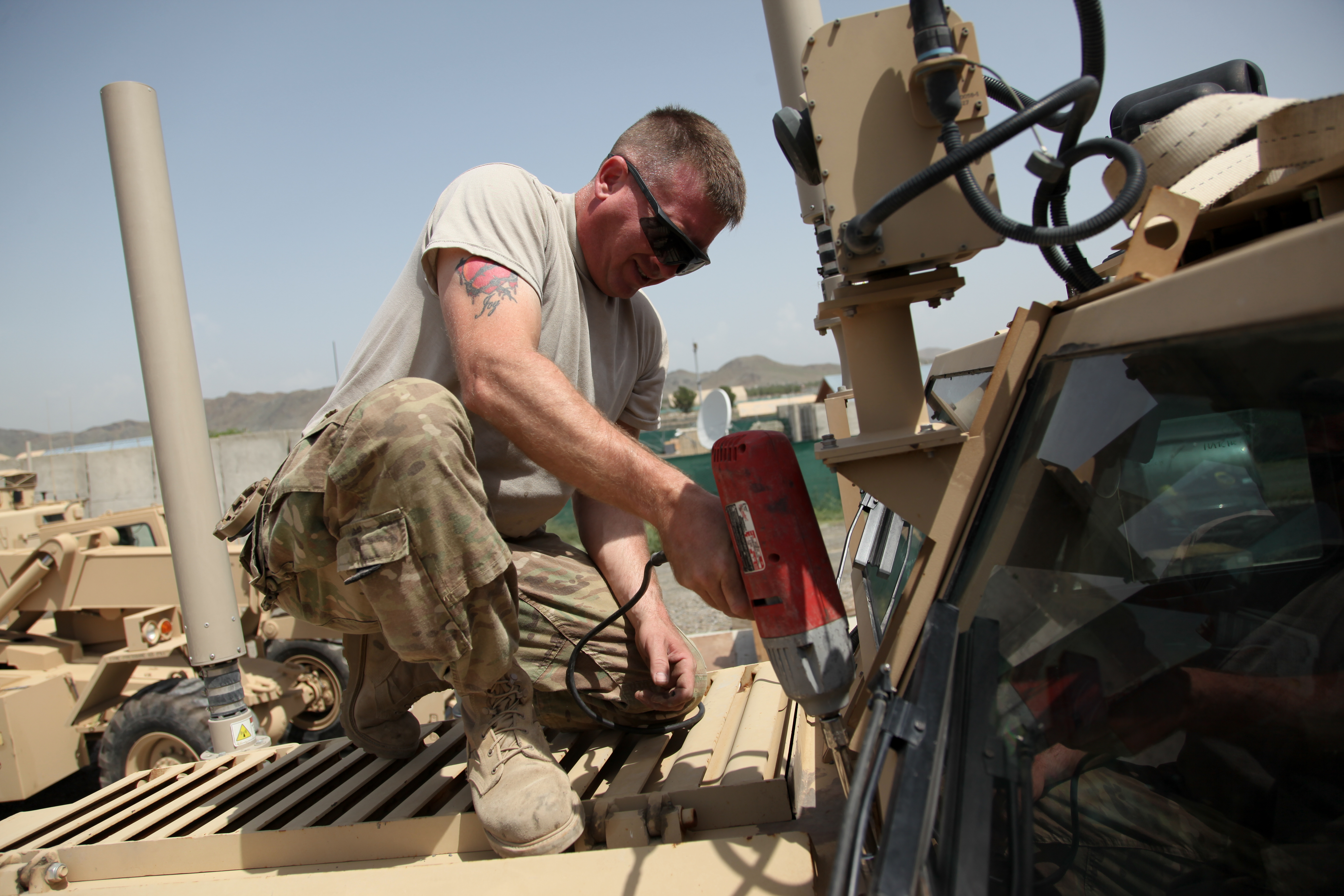
A Seabee, assigned to Construction Battalion Maintenance Unit 202, conducts maintenance on a Cougar HE 6x6, at Forward Operating Base Salerno, Khost province, Afghanistan.

When during World War II these units had 1/4 the personnel of a CB. Their task was to assume maintenance of bases once CBs had completed construction. Today, CBMU's provide public works support at Naval Support Activities, Forward Operating Bases, and Fleet Hospital/Expeditionary Medical Facilities during wartime or contingency operations for a Marine Expeditionary Force (MEF), Marine Expeditionary Group (MEG), or NSW. They also provide disaster recovery support to Naval Regional Commanders in CONUS.

- CBMU 202 Joint Expeditionary Base Little Creek-Fort Story, VA (formerly Naval Amphibious Base)
  - det Jacksonville
- CBMU 303 Navy Expeditionary Combat Force, Naval Base San Diego, Ca.
  - det Port Hueneme
  - det Pearl Harbor

NAVFAC Engineering & Expeditionary Warfare Center Ocean Facilities Department. Gives support to the Fleet through the support of Underwater Construction Teams. UCTs deploy worldwide to conduct underwater construction, inspection, repair, and underwater demolition.

Underwater Construction Teams (UCT)

Underwater Construction Team 2 along with divers of the National Park Service ascertain the condition and status of the battleship USS Arizona Memorial in 2013

UCTs deploy worldwide tasked with underwater construction, inspections, repairs, and demolition operations. They can support a Fleet Marine Force amphibious operation or provide combat service support ashore. UCT1 is home ported at Little Creek, Virginia, while UCT2 is at Port Hueneme, California.

After basic UCT training a diver is qualified as a 2nd Class Diver. Training is 26 weeks at the Dive school at Panama City, Florida. It includes a tactical training phase for advanced combat and demolitions skills. The training qualifies divers as Underwater Construction Technicians skilled in: seafloor excavation, hydrographic surveys, search and recovery, engineering reconnaissance, and precision demolitions. Senior NCOs are schooled for their supervisory positions whether construction or demolition.

UCT divers can apply for selection to support the Naval Special Warfare Development Group.

Public Works: U.S. Naval Bases

These units have CEC officers leading them and enlisted Seabees for the various crews. About one-third of new Seabees are assigned to Public Works Departments (PWD) at naval installations both within the United States and overseas. While stationed at a Public Works Department, a Seabee can get specialized training and experience in multiple facets of their rating. Many bases have civilians that augment Public Works, but the department is a military operation.

Combat Service Support Detachments (CSSD) / Naval Special Warfare (NSW)

The Seabee detachments have several hundred supporting Naval Special Warfare (NSW) units based out of Coronado, CA, and Virginia Beach, VA. Field support can include camp construction, camp and vehicle maintenance, power generation, transportation logistics, and water purification. The assignment requires additional training in first aid, small arms, driving, specialized equipment, and qualifying as Expeditionary Warfare Specialists. With that qualification a Seabee can be classified as 5306 – Naval Special Warfare (Combat Service Support) or 5307 – Naval Special Warfare (Combat Support). They also can apply for selection to support the Naval Special Warfare Development Group.

== Training and rates ==
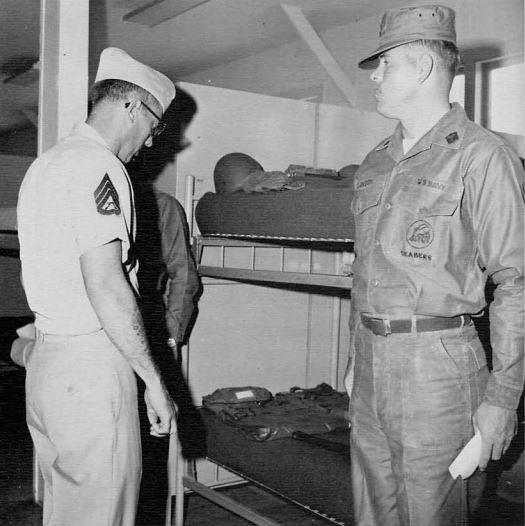
USMC barracks inspection during NMCB 74's military training at Camp Lejeune in March 1968

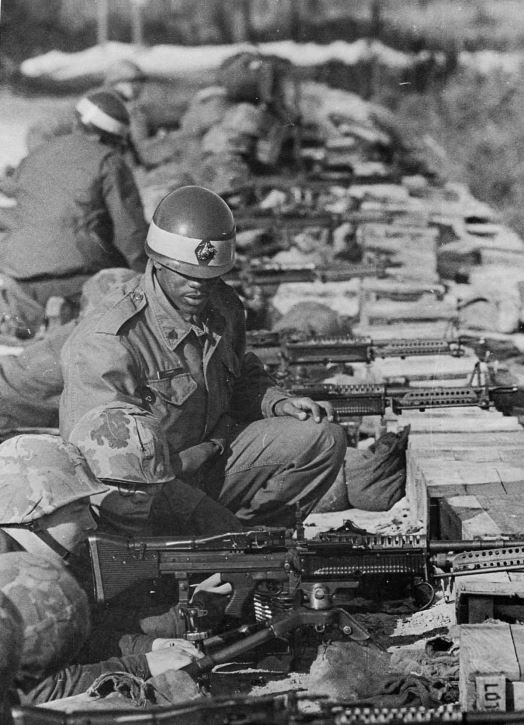
USMC M60 instruction at Camp Lejeune for MCB 71 in 1967

Trainees begin "A" School (trade school) upon completion of boot: 4 weeks classroom, 8 weeks hands-on. From "A" School, trainees most often report to a NMCB or ACB. There, recruits go through four-weeks of Expeditionary Combat Skills (ECS), which is also required for those who report to a Navy Expeditionary Combat Command. ECS provides basic training in map reading, combat first aid, recon and other combat-related skills. Half of each course is spent on basic marksmanship to qualify with the M4 carbine and the M9 service pistol. Those posted to Alfa Company of an NMCB may be assigned to a crew-served weapon, like the MK 19 40 mm grenade launcher, the M2 Browning .50-caliber machine gun or the M240 machine gun. Many reserve units still field the M60 machine gun. Seabees were last in the U.S. military to wear the U.S. Woodland camouflage uniform and the Desert Camouflage Uniform. They now have the Navy Working Uniform Type III and use ALICE field gear. Some units with the Marines will use USMC-issue Improved load-bearing equipment (ILBE).

Current rates: The current ratings were adopted by the Navy in 1948.

- BU : Builder
- CE : Construction electrician
- CM : Construction mechanic
- EA : Engineering aide
- EO : Equipment operator
- SW : Steelworker
- UT : Utilitiesman

The Seabee "constructionman" ranks of E-1 through E-3 are designated by sky-blue stripes on uniforms. The color was adopted in 1899 as a uniform trim color designating the Civil Engineer Corps, but was later given up. Its continued use is a bit of Naval Heritage in the NCF.

At paygrade E-8, the Builder, Steelworker, and Engineering Aid rates combine into a single rate: Senior Chief Constructionman (CUCS). Before NAVADMIN 054/21, at the E-9 paygrade they were referred to as a Master Chief Constructionman (CUCM).

Before NAVADMIN 054/21, the remaining Seabee rates combined only at the E-9 paygrade:

- Master Chief Equipmentman (EQCM) for Equipment Operator and Construction Mechanic.
- Master Chief Utilitiesman (UCCM) for Construction Electrician and Utilitiesman.

Per NAVADMIN 054/21: Constructionman Master Chief (CUCM), Equipmentman Master Chief (EQCM) and Utilities Constructionman Master Chief (UCCM) renamed Seabee Master Chief (CBCM). Those Master Chiefs already in CUCM, EQCM or UCCM ratings were to be automatically converted to CBCM on 15 March 2021, but current source ratings badges were to be retained.

Seabee Underwater Construction Technicians Insignia

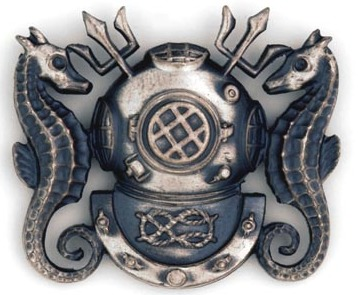
Master Diver

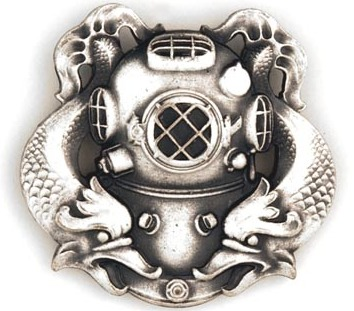
1st Class Diver

2nd Class Diver

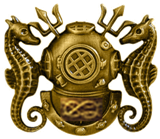
Diving Officer

Diver is a qualification that the various rates can obtain with three grades: Basic Underwater Construction Technician/ NEC B17A (2nd Class Diver), Advanced Underwater Construction Technician/ NEC B18A (1st Class Diver), and Master Underwater Construction Technician/ NEC B16A (Master diver). Seabee divers are attached to five principal commands outside the NCF:

- UCT ONE, Little Creek, VA.
- UCT TWO, Port Hueneme, CA.
- Naval Facilities Engineering Service Center (NFESC) that has detachments in Port Hueneme, CA, and in the Washington Navy Yard, DC. These are CEC officer billets only. Those at Port Hueneme are with the highly technical NFESC "Dive Locker Team".
- Navy System Commands, e.g., NAVSEA or NAVAIR. These are CEC officer billets only.
- Navy Experimental Diving Unit – Navy Diving & Salvage Training Center (NEDU/NDSTC)

== The "Seabee" and Unit insignias ==
On 1 March 1942 the RADM Moreell recommended that an insignia be created to promote esprit de corps in the new CBs to ID their equipment as the Air corps did to ID squadrons. It was not intended for uniforms. Frank J. Iafrate, a civilian file clerk at Quonset Point Advance Naval Base, Davisville, Rhode Island, who created the original "Disney Style" Seabee. In early 1942 his design was sent to RADM Moreell who made a single request: that the Seabee being set inside a letter Q, for Quonset Point, be changed to a hawser rope and it would be officially adopted.

The Seabees had a second Logo. It was of a shirtless constructionman holding a sledge hammer with a rifle strapped across his back standing upon the words "Construimus Batuimus USN". The figure was on a shield with a blue field across the top and vertical red and white stripes. A small CEC logo is left of the figure and a small anchor is to the right. This logo was incorporated into many CB Unit insignias.

During World War II, artists working for Disney Insignia Department designed logos for about ten Seabee units including the: 60th NCB, 78th NCB 112th NCB, and the 133rd NCB. There are two Disney published Seabee logos that are not identified with any unit.

== Qualification badges and Unit awards ==
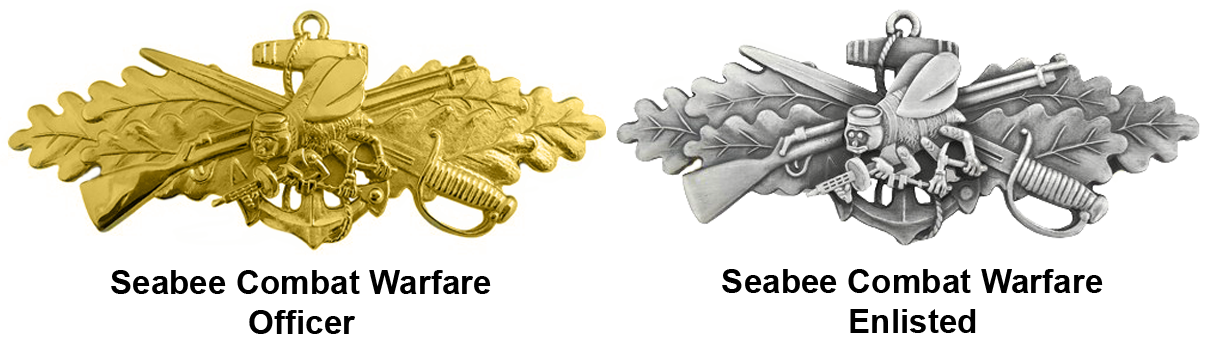
SCW insignia: Seabee Officers and enlisted

The military qualification badge for the Seabees is known as the Seabee combat warfare specialist insignia (SCW). It was created in 1993 for both officers and enlisted personnel attached to qualifying units: NMCBs, ACBs, UCTs, or NCRs. Its designer, Commander Ross S. Selvidge, CEC, USNR, was the first to wear the insignia.

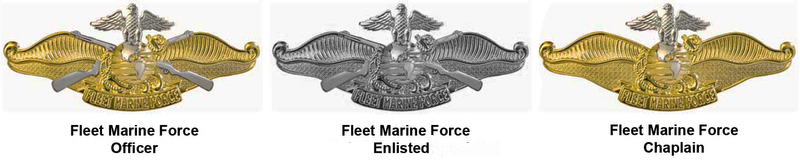
FMF insignia for USN: Officer, Enlisted, and Chaplain

The Fleet Marine Force Insignia or Fleet Marine Force pin (FMF pin), is for USN officers or enlisted trained and qualified to support the USMC. It comes in three classes : enlisted, officer, and chaplain. For requirements, see: Fleet Marine Force Warfare Specialist (EFMFWS) Program per OPNAV Instruction 1414.4B.

The Peltier Award is given annually to the "Best of Type" active duty Construction Battalion. It was instituted by Rear Admiral Eugene J. Peltier CEC in 1960. He was Commander of BuDocks 1959–1962.

== Seabee barge carriers ==
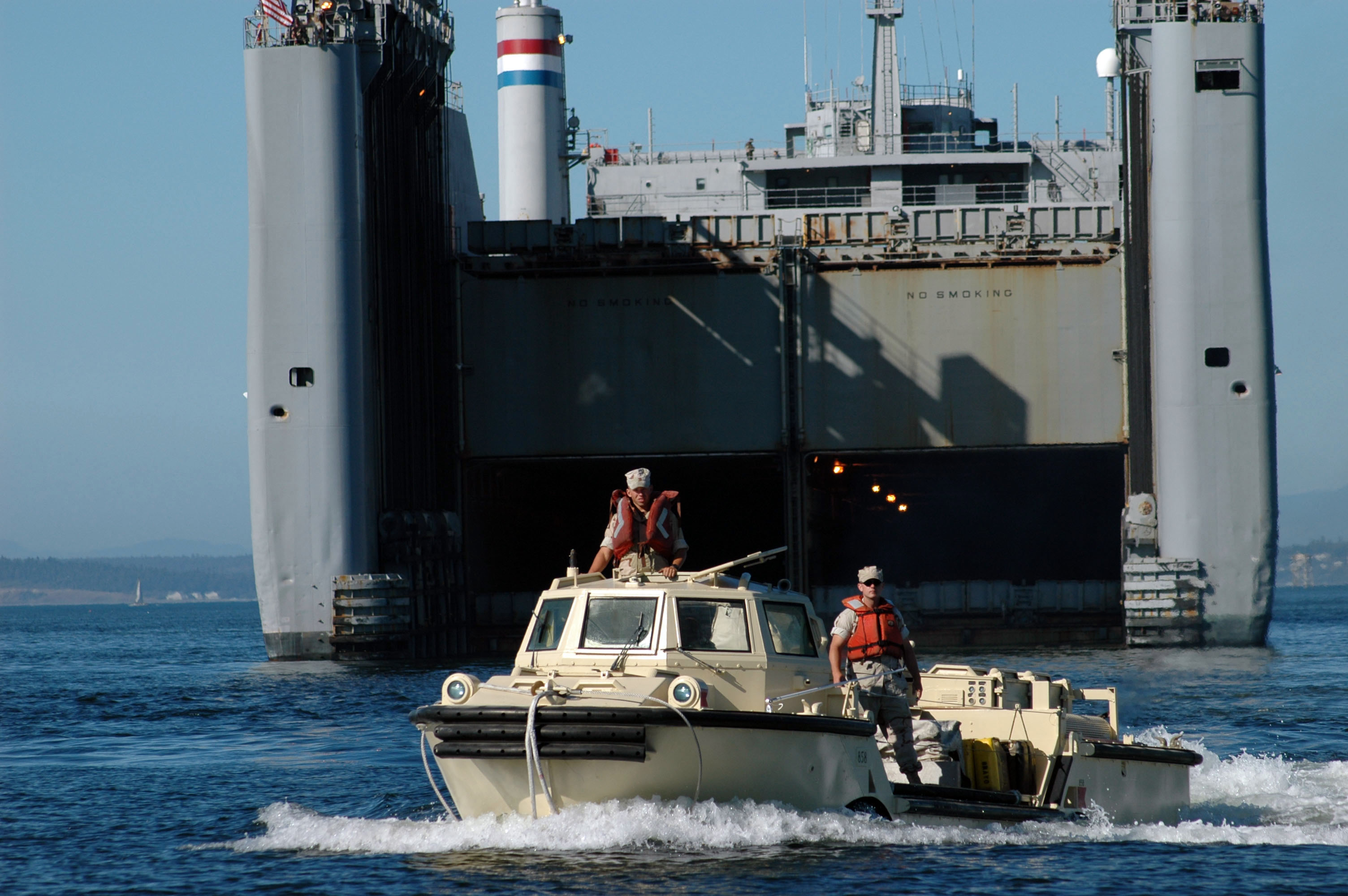
US Navy Seabees from Beachmaster Unit One (BMU-1) operate a LARC-V, launching from a Military Sealift Command (MSC) sea barge heavy lift ship SS Cape Mohican (T-AKR-5065)

There were six "Seabee" ships built: the SS Cape Mendocino (T-AKR-5064), the SS Cape May (T-AKR-5063), SS Cape Mohican (T-AKR-5065) and three operated by Lykes Brothers Steamship Company (the SS Doctor Lykes, the SS Tillie Lykes, and the SS Almeria Lykes). The NCF is the principal user of Seabee barges. Barges are shuttled to and from the mother ship, facilitating the unloading of containerized cargo wherever needed. These ships have an elevator system for lifting the barges out of the water at the stern onto the vessel. Barges, loaded or not are elevated to one of the three decks and then moved forward towards the bow on a track to be stored. The ship can carry 38 barges, 12 each on the lower decks and 14 on the upper. The 38 barges have a total capacity for 160 shipping containers. They have a draft of 2.5', and measure 97'x35'. Besides the barges, the ship has a fuel storage capacity of nearly 36000 m^{3} (9,510,194 gal.) built in its sides and double hull, allowing it to double as a fuel transport. The ships were purchased by the Military Sealift Command.

== Museums ==
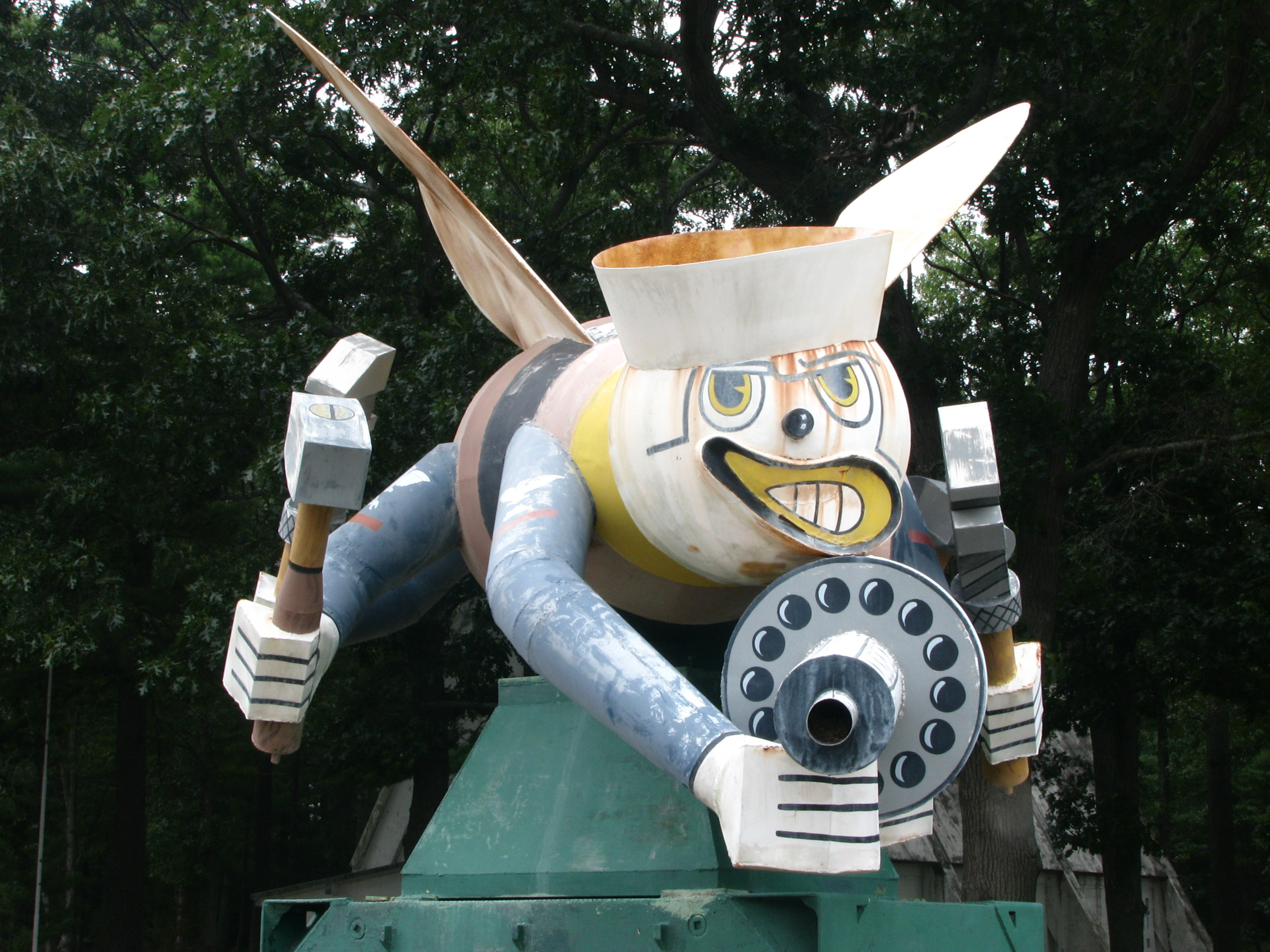
The Fighting Seabee Statue at Quonset Point, where the Seabee Museum and Memorial Park commemorates Camp Endicott which is on the National Register of Historic Places (U.S. Navy)

The U.S. Navy Seabee Museum is located outside the main gate of Naval Base Ventura County in Port Hueneme, California. In July 2011, the new facility opened with galleries, a grand hall, a theater, storage, and research areas.

The Seabee Heritage Center, located in Gulfport, Mississippi, is the Atlantic Coast Annex of the Seabee Museum in Port Hueneme. It opened in 1995. Exhibits at the Gulfport Annex are provided by the Seabee Museum in Port Hueneme.

The Seabee Museum and Memorial Park in Davisville, Rhode Island was opened in the late 1990s. A Fighting Seabee Statue is located there.

== Seabees of notable Seabee service ==
- Admiral Ben Moreell (created the Seabees)
- CM3 Marvin Glenn Shields (Medal of Honor)
- SW2 Robert Stethem (Seabee diver)
- Cdr Blake Wayne Van Leer

== See also ==
- Military engineering of the United States
- Naval Mobile Construction Battalion 1
- Naval Mobile Construction Battalion 3
- Naval Mobile Construction Battalion 4
- Naval Mobile Construction Battalion 5
- Naval Mobile Construction Battalion 11
- Naval Mobile Construction Battalion 133
- Underwater Construction Teams
- Parks Reserve Forces Training Area
- Seabees Memorial
- United States Navy Experimental Diving Unit
- Unsinkable aircraft carrier
- Seabees Naval Bases in North Africa
- USS Marvin Shields
- USS Stethem

Other U.S. military construction/engineering units:

- RED HORSE – U.S. Air Force
- United States Army Corps of Engineers
- USMC Combat Engineer Battalions

== Notes ==
World War II

- Presidential Unit Citation USN/USMC
  - 6th CB, 1st Marine Div., Guadalcanal.
  - 18th CB, 2nd Marine Div., Tarawa
  - 33rd CB, shore party detachment, 1st Marine Div., Peleliu
  - 73rd CB, shore party detachment, 1st Marine Div., Peleliu
  - 121st CB, 12-man doodlebug landing party, 4th Marine Div., Tinian
- U.S. Army Distinguished Unit Citation
  - 40th CB, 1st Cavalry Div., Los Negros
  - 78th CB, 12 men, 1st Cavalry Div., Los Negros
- WWII U.S.N. CB awards for valor were listed each month in All Hands along with the rest of the Navy.

Marine Corps, Seabees outside the NCF

- When the 18th, 19th and 25th CBs were transferred to the Marine Corps they each were reduced by one company plus 1/5th of Hq Co to match the organization of a USMC battalion. B Co from the 25th CB and C Co from the 18th CB were used to form the 53rd CB. The other company was used to form the 121st CB.
- Due to Seabees being given advanced rank upon enlistment, enlisted Marines referred to construction battalions as "sergeant's battalions". USMC sergeants do not pull guard duty, so the ranked Seabees would not be assigned. The NCOs of the 18th wore USMC chevrons and not USN "crows" on their uniforms.
- USN insignia on USMC issue.
- Seabees were shore party for the Marines on Bougainville, Peleliu, Guam, Purata Island, Roi-Namur, Saipan, Iwo Jima, and Okinawa. The Marines deployed them as combat engineers at Cape Gloucester, Tarawa, and Tinian.
- The first Marines assigned to a CB were attached to CBD 1010 on Guam. The 2nd Separate Marine Engineer Battalion was next, assigned to the 27th NCR with two former USMC CBs; the 25th and the 53rd. In mid-August 1944 the 1st Separate Marine Engineer Battalion was assigned to the 30th NCR. Prior, 100 Marines were assigned to the 71st CB on Bougainville.

NCDUs, Seabees outside the NCF

- NCDUs at Normandy: 11, 22–30, 41–46, 127–8, 130-42
- The Joint Army Navy Experimental Testing (JANET) site for beach obstacle removal, Project DM-361, was located at the ex-Seabee base, Camp Bradford after the NCDU program moved.
- 14 NCDUs were combined to create UDT 9, almost completely Seabees
- NCDUs 200 – 216 were combined to create UDT 15.
- Presidential Unit Citation USN/USMC : Naval Combat Demolition Force O on Omaha beach at Normandy.
- Navy Unit Commendation: Naval Combat Demolition Force U on Utah beach at Normandy.

UDTs, Seabees outside the NCF

- The Naval Special Warfare Command building at the U.S.N. Seal base at Fort Pierce is named for Ltjg. Frank Kaine CEC commander of NCDU 2.
- General Donovan the head of the OSS approached General MacArthur and Admiral Nimitz about using OSS men in the Pacific with Europe invaded. Gen. MacArthur had no interest. Adm. Nimitz looked at Donovan's list and also said no, except he could use the swimmers from the Maritime Unit. He was only interested in them for being swimmers not being OSS.
- Seabees outside the NCF, made naval history. Admiral Turner recommended over 60 Silver Stars and over 300 Bronze Stars with Vs for the Seabees and other service members of UDTs 1-7 That was unpresendented in USN/USMC history. For UDTs 5 and 7 at Tinian and UDTs 3 and 4 at Guam, all officers received a silver stars and all enlisted received bronze stars with Vs. Adm. Conolly felt Lt. Crist and Lt. Carberry of UDTs 3 & 4 should have received Navy Crosses at Guam.
- many of the men from UDTs 1 and 2 were used to form UDTs 3 and 4.
- UDT 3 at formation had 11 CEC, 4 USN, 1 USMC Officers
- UDT 7's officers went through "indoctrination" in "Area E" at Camp Peary.

Seabee North Slope Oil Exploration 1944

- Seabee Creek was named by CBD 1058 and runs into the Colville River at Umiat, AK.
- USN geologists with CBD 1058 discovered the large Aupuk Gas Seep.

Cold War: Korea – Seabee Teams

- In October 1965 MCB 11 had two Seabee Teams assigned to "Project Demo". The U.S. State Dept. tasked them with de-bugging embassies behind the Iron Curtain and repair the damage caused by the removal.

Cold War: Antarctica

- Seabee Heights is a geologic feature of the Transantarctic Mountains. It overlooks the Beardmore Glacier Seabee traverse route inland.
- Seabee Hook is located near the site of Hallett Station on the Ross Sea.

Cold War: Vietnam

- Commander Naval Construction Battalion U.S. Pacific Fleet, Tân Sơn Nhất, Republic of Vietnam, Completion Report 1963–1972.
- Military training for CBs during this period lasted six weeks. Two weeks were at the respective homeport and four weeks with the Marines at Camp Lejuene or Camp Pendleton.
- Presidential Unit Citation USN/USMC : Dets from MCBs 5, 10, 53 and CBMU 301 in support of the 26th Marines at the Battle of Khe Sanh Jan–Feb 1968.
- Cold War projects: 1961 floating dry dock for Polaris submarines at Holy Loch, Scotland. 1963 U.S. Naval Communications Listening Station Nea Makri, Greece.

Cold War: CIA

- When CBD 1510 transferred to CBD 1504 it was designated for function similar to Acorns: Aviation and OTA. The Navy's use of "OTA" denotes the assignment to the CIA in that Other Transaction Authority (OTA) is the term commonly used to refer to the (10 U.S.C. 2371b) authority of the Department of Defense (DoD) to carry out certain prototype, research and production projects."
- In 2007, the Naval Expeditionary Combat Command (NECC) authorized funding forty Naval Intelligence billets in the NCF. The goal was to have organic NCF Intelligence personnel. Historically the training officer would become the intelligence officer when a CB deployed.
- CIA redacted memorandum dated 14 June 1968 discusses the use on Naval Construction Personnel/Seabees on a project.

Iraq Afghanistan

- Presidential Unit Citation USN/USMC : 30th NCR, NMCBs 4, 5, 74, 133, Air-Det 22nd NCR, Air-Det UCT 2, NCF Support Unit 2 in support of the First Marine Expeditionary Force (I MEF Engineer Group) in November 2003 added later upon review were: NMCBs 7, 15 as well as Air-Det NMCB 21, Air-Det NMCB 25, and CBMU 303 Det. (per: CMC MARADMIN 507/03)
- In 2015, ACB 1 moved the Orion (spacecraft) Boilerplate (spaceflight) test article for NASA at San Diego, CA.

Seabee insignia

- World War II Naval Construction Battalion Logos
- CBs sponsored many B-29s on Tinian tagging the aircraft with Seabee unit insignia as nose art.

Naval Support Unit

- In 1977, the U.S. Embassy in Moscow suffered a severe fire prompting the construction of a new one in 1979. At the construction site of the new embassy twenty to thirty Seabees were assigned to oversee 800 plus Russian construction workers. This prompted the Russians to embed bugs in construction materials prior to delivery to the construction site. The success of the KGB in bugging the new embassy only reinforced the State Department's need for the Seabees.

SEABEE Barge Carriers

- Unusual Hull Design Requirements of the SEABEE Barge Carriers.

== General sources ==
- "Seabee History: Between the Second World War and the Korean War". Naval History and Heritage Command. 1 July 2015.
