= 125th Fighter Wing =

Florida Air National Guard unit

125th Fighter Wing

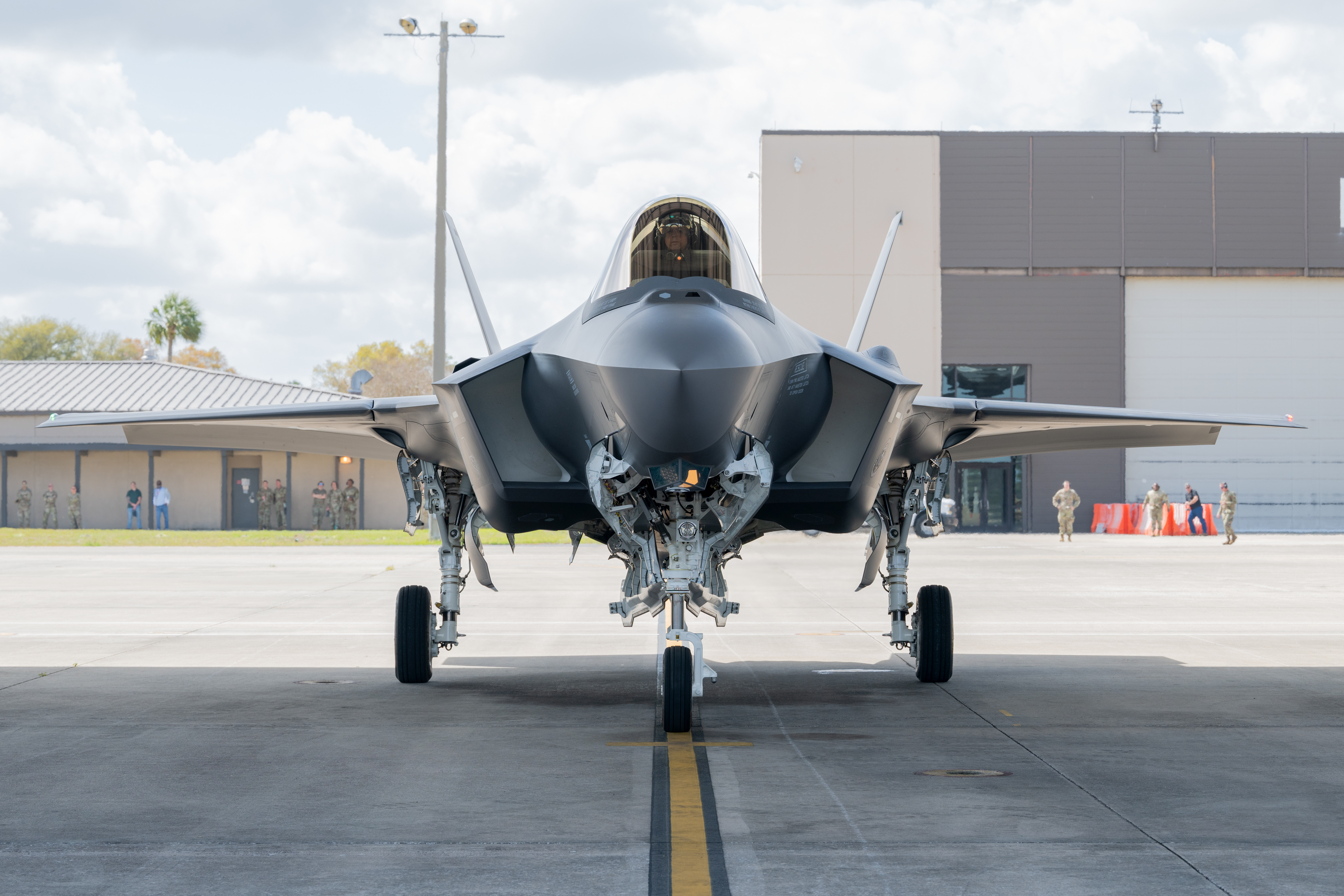
- 125th Fighter Wing F-35A Lightning II at Jacksonville Air National Guard Base
- Active: 1 July 1956–present
- Country: United States
- Allegiance: Florida
- Branch: Air National Guard
- Type: Wing
- Role: Air defense fighter
- Size: 1100
- Part of: Florida Air National Guard
- Garrison/HQ: Jacksonville Air National Guard Base, Florida

Commanders
- Commander: Col. Daniel J. Wittmer
- Deputy Commander: Col. David R. Siemion
- Command Chief: CMSgt William E. Ryals III
- Notable commanders: Gen. Craig R. McKinley; Maj. Gen. James O. Eifert

Insignia
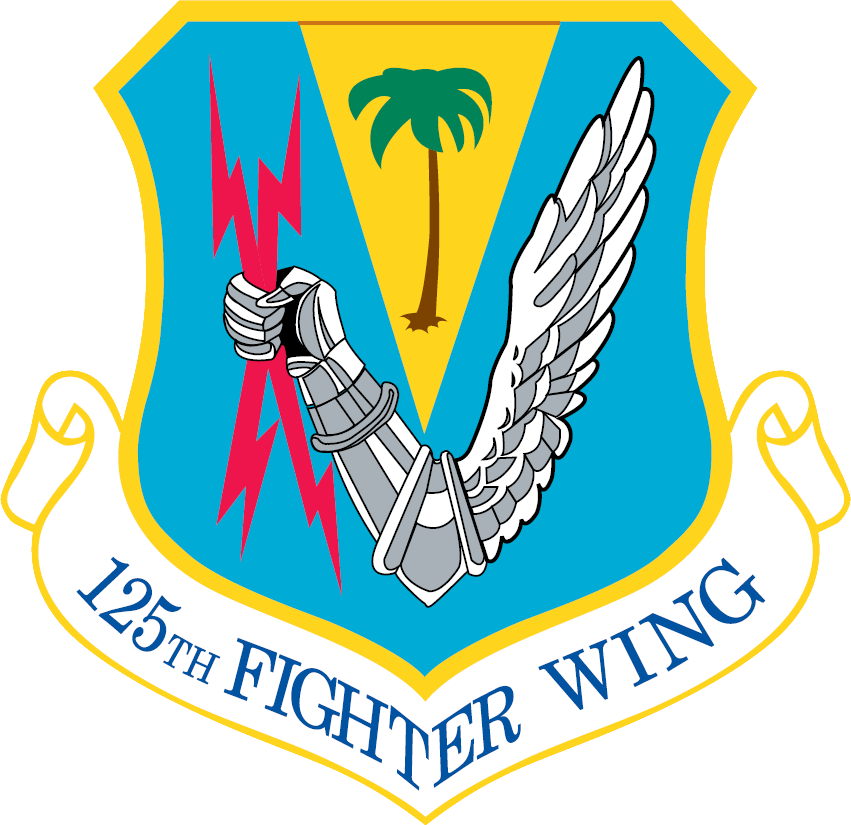
- 125th Fighter Wing emblem
- Tail stripe: Dark blue stripe "Florida" in white letters, lightning bolt

Aircraft flown
- Fighter: F-35A Lightning II

The 125th Fighter Wing is a unit of the Florida Air National Guard, stationed at Jacksonville Air National Guard Base, Florida. If activated to federal service with the United States Air Force, the 125 FW is operationally gained by the Air Combat Command (ACC).

== Mission ==
As an Air National Guard unit, the 125th Fighter Wing has a dual mission - one state and one federal. The state mission under Title 32 of the United States Code (Title 32 USC) is to provide trained and equipped personnel to protect life and property and to preserve peace, order, and public safety under the governor of the State of Florida as part of both the Florida Air National Guard and the broader Florida National Guard. The federal mission under Title 10 USC is to provide fully trained and qualified personnel to the commander, United States Northern Command (USNORTHCOM) / North American Aerospace Defense Command (NORAD) in time of war or national emergency for the defense of the North American continent, with operational responsibility for the 125 FW as a U.S. Air Force unit falling to the Air Combat Command (ACC). The 125 FW is also available to other combatant commanders for forward deployment outside the United States (OCONUS) in order to perform air superiority/air dominance missions in other theaters of operation and areas of responsibility.

In addition to its primary installation, the Jacksonville Air National Guard Base at Jacksonville International Airport, the 125 FW has historically maintained a 24/7/365 alert detachment of armed fighter aircraft at Detachment 1, 125 FW, Operating Location ALPHA ALPHA (OL-AA) at Homestead Air Reserve Base in South Florida since the end of the Cuban Missile Crisis in October 1962. This alert mission is temporarily being covered by other ANG units with F-15C or F-16C aircraft until the 125 FW has achieved operational capbaility with the F-35A.

The overall wing organization comprises over 1100 citizen airmen in a combination of full-time Active Guard and Reserve (AGR) and Air Reserve Technician (ART) personnel and traditional part-time Drill Status Air Guardsmen (DSG).

== Units ==
- 125th Operations Group (125 OG)

159th Fighter Squadron (159 FS)
125th Operations Support Flight (125 OSF)
125 FW Detachment 1/OL-AA – Geographically Separate Unit (GSU) at Homestead Air Reserve Base (F-35A Lightning II, rotational alert)
114th Electromagnetic Warfare Squadron (114 EWS) – GSU at Cape Canaveral Space Force Station
249th Special Operations Squadron (Associate) (249 SOS) – GSU at Hurlburt Field (CV-22B Osprey)

- 125th Maintenance Group (125 MXG)

125th Aircraft Maintenance Squadron (125 AMXS)
125th Maintenance Squadron (125 MXS)
125th Maintenance Operations Flight (125 MOF)

- 125th Mission Support Group (125 MSG)

125th Force Support Squadron (125 FSS)
125th Logistics Readiness Squadron (125 LRS)
125th Civil Engineering Squadron (125 CES)
125th Security Forces Squadron (125 SFS)
125th Communications Flight (125 CF)

- 125th Medical Group (125 MDG)

125th Medical Group Detachment 1

- 125th Regional Support Group (125 RSG) – GSU at Camp Blanding

202d RED HORSE Squadron (202 RHS) – GSU at Camp Blanding
290th Joint Communications Support Squadron (290 JCSS) – GSU at MacDill AFB
159th Weather Flight (159 WF) – GSU at Camp Blanding
131st Training Flight (131 TF) – GSU at Camp Blanding

== History ==
On 1 July 1956, the Florida Air National Guard's 159th Fighter-Interceptor Squadron (159 FIS) was authorized to expand to a group level organization and the 125th Fighter Group (Air Defense) was established by the National Guard Bureau, the 159 FIS becoming the group's flying squadron. Other squadrons and squadron equivalents assigned to the group were the 125th Headquarters, 125th Material Squadron (Maintenance), 125th Combat Support Squadron, and the 125th USAF Dispensary.

With the establishment of the 125th, the unit converted to the F-86D Sabre (also known as the "Dog" version of the Sabre) with the primary mission of continental air defense of the southeastern United States.

In 1958, the 125th became the first Air National Guard unit to earn the right to compete in the Air Defense Command's annual William Tell Weapons Meet, and was the first team ever to fire a perfect score in that competition.

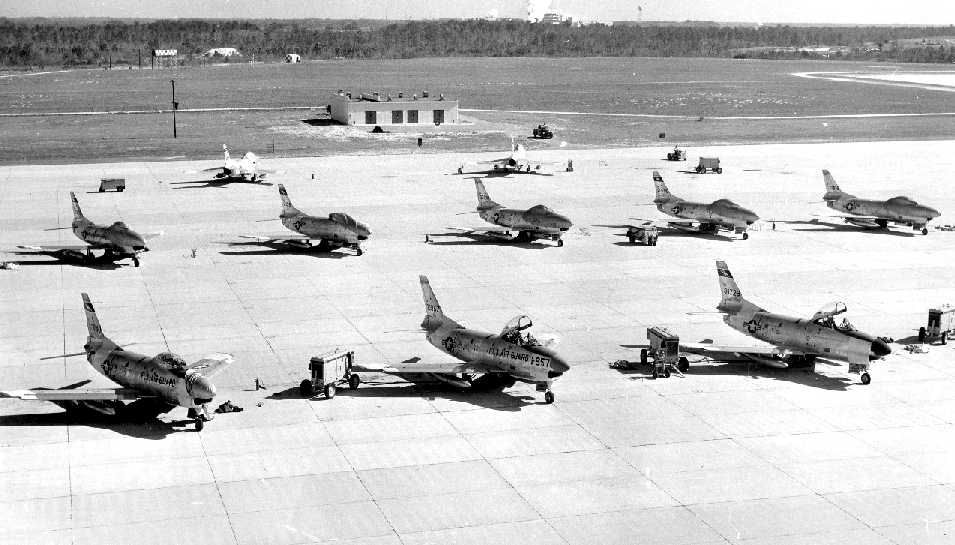
North American F-86L Sabres of the 159 FIS at Imeson Airport, 1957

In July 1960, the 125th converted from the F-86D to the all-weather, supersonic F-102A and F-102B Delta Dagger. In 1965, as an after effect of the Cuban Missile Crisis and given increased Soviet Air Force aircraft operations in Cuba, the 125 FIG established Operating Location Alpha Alpha (OL-AA) for 125 FIG, Detachment 1, at what was then Homestead Air Force Base, Florida to provide air defense ready alert fighter aircraft in the southern portion of Florida. This same alert detachment continues operations today at the present day Homestead Air Reserve Base with no less than two 125th F-15C aircraft, pilots, and support personnel periodically rotated from home station in Jacksonville.

In January 1968, Air Defense Command was renamed the Aerospace Defense Command (ADC) and continued to be the 125 FIG's gaining command. Also in 1968, following completion of the new Jacksonville International Airport, the 125th relocated from their military cantonment area at Jacksonville's former Imeson Airport to a newly constructed military installation, the current Jacksonville Air National Guard Base, at the new airport. With the concurrent closure of Imeson Airport to all flight operations and its conversion to an industrial park, the 125 FIG vacated all of its former facilities at Imeson Airport and, via the General Services Administration, turned over same to the City of Jacksonville.

In July 1974, the 125th Fighter-Interceptor Group commenced conversion to the F-106A and F-106B Delta Dart. Only one year after the F-106 conversion, the unit again earned the right to compete in that year's annual Air Force air-to-air weapons competition, William Tell '76, at Tyndall AFB, Florida.

In March 1980, ADC was inactivated and the USAF air defense mission was transferred to Tactical Air Command (TAC). TAC then became the gaining command for the 125 FIG.

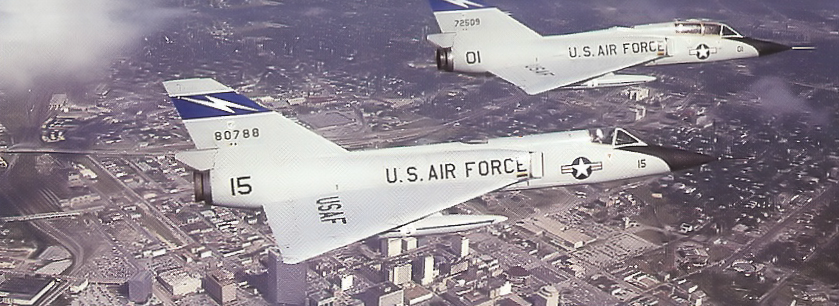
Convair F-106B, AF Ser. No. 57-2509 and F-106A, AF Ser. No. 58-0788 of the 125 FIG overhead Jacksonville in the late 1970s/early 1980s. 2509 sent to AMARC on 24 May 1990 as FN0196 and modified to a QF-106 target drone (AD268) on 23 June 1994. It was written off on 7 Oct 1997 following a ground mishap and fire. Purchased by private individual in Apr 2000, it was moved to El Paso, TX for restoration. 788 was sent to AMARC on 22 Jan 1987 and also modified as a QF-106 target drone (AD150). It was expended and shot down by a Patriot missile during an exercise event on 24 Sept 1992.

In April 1987, the 125th converted to the F-16A and F-16B Fighting Falcon, a multi-role fighter. The 125th's aircraft were further modified as the F-16ADF, making the aircraft specifically designed for the air defense role with the removal of air-to-ground weapons capability. The 125th was the first ANG unit to assume NORAD Air Defense Alert with the F-16ADF, the first operational F-16ADF unit to employ the AIM-7 Sparrow III missile, and the first F-16ADF unit to sit alert with the AIM-7 missile.

With the disestablishment of Tactical Air Command (TAC) in 1992, the 125 FIG's gaining command changed again to the newly created Air Combat Command (ACC). As part of this change, the unit's designation was changed to 125th Fighter Group (125 FG). With creation of the USAF "objective wing" construct in the early 1990s, the bulk of all Air National Guard groups with operational flying missions were redesignated as wings. As a result, the 125 FG was subsequently redesignated as the 125th Fighter Wing (125 FW), the designation it continues to hold today.

In June 1995, the 125 FW was converted to the F-15A and F-15B Eagle, a fighter aircraft which added significant air superiority capability to the Continental NORAD Region (CONR) Air Defense mission. During the late 1990s, the 125 FW was also fully integrated into the USAF Air and Space Expeditionary Force (AEF) to construct and routinely deployed aircraft and personnel to the 363rd Air Expeditionary Wing (363 AEW) at Prince Sultan Air Base, Al Kharj, Kingdom of Saudi Arabia in support of Operation Southern Watch, enforcing the United Nations Security Council Resolutions that established a no-fly zone over southern Iraq following Operation Desert Storm that was monitored by a combination of USAF, U.S. Navy, U.S. Marine Corps, Royal Air Force, French Air Force, and Royal Saudi Air Force aircraft. Since 11 September 2001, the wing has also been extensively involved in Operation Noble Eagle, performing its historic continental air defense mission, as well as having periodically deployed aircraft and personnel to U.S. Central Command Air Forces (USCENTAF), later renamed U.S. Air Forces Central (USAFCENT), in Southwest Asia in support of Operation Enduring Freedom and Operation Iraqi Freedom until their conclusion.

On a daily basis in the United States, the 125 FW is responsible for the maintenance of a USNORTHCOM / NORAD Air Defense Alert mission at both its home station in Jacksonville ANGB and at an additional operating location at Homestead ARB, Florida. In this capacity, the wing provides armed F-15 aircraft capable of intercepting, identifying, and, if necessary, destroying unknown aircraft which penetrate sovereign U.S. airspace. In the past, this threat has included Soviet Tu-95 BEAR and Tu-22 BLACKJACK bombers, various Soviet-built Cuban Air Force fighters, and civilian narcotics traffickers of various nationalities.

When it initially converted to the Air Defense Fighter (ADF) variant of the F-16A, the 125 FW was the first operational NORAD Air Defense Alert unit to employ the AIM-7 Sparrow III missile, the first F-16ADF unit to sit alert with the AIM-7, and the first unit to deploy to the former Howard AFB, Panama in support of JCS-directed operation Coronet Nighthawk using enhanced identification tactics. In October 1995, the 125 FW became the first unit ever to complete a transition from one fourth generation fighter to another fourth generation fighter as it transitioned from the F-16ADF to the F-15A/B. In April 1997, the 125 FW became the first Air Defense unit to employ as Blue Air in an Offensive Counter Air (OCA) role, integrated with an active duty unit during a Red Flag exercise at Nellis AFB, Nevada.

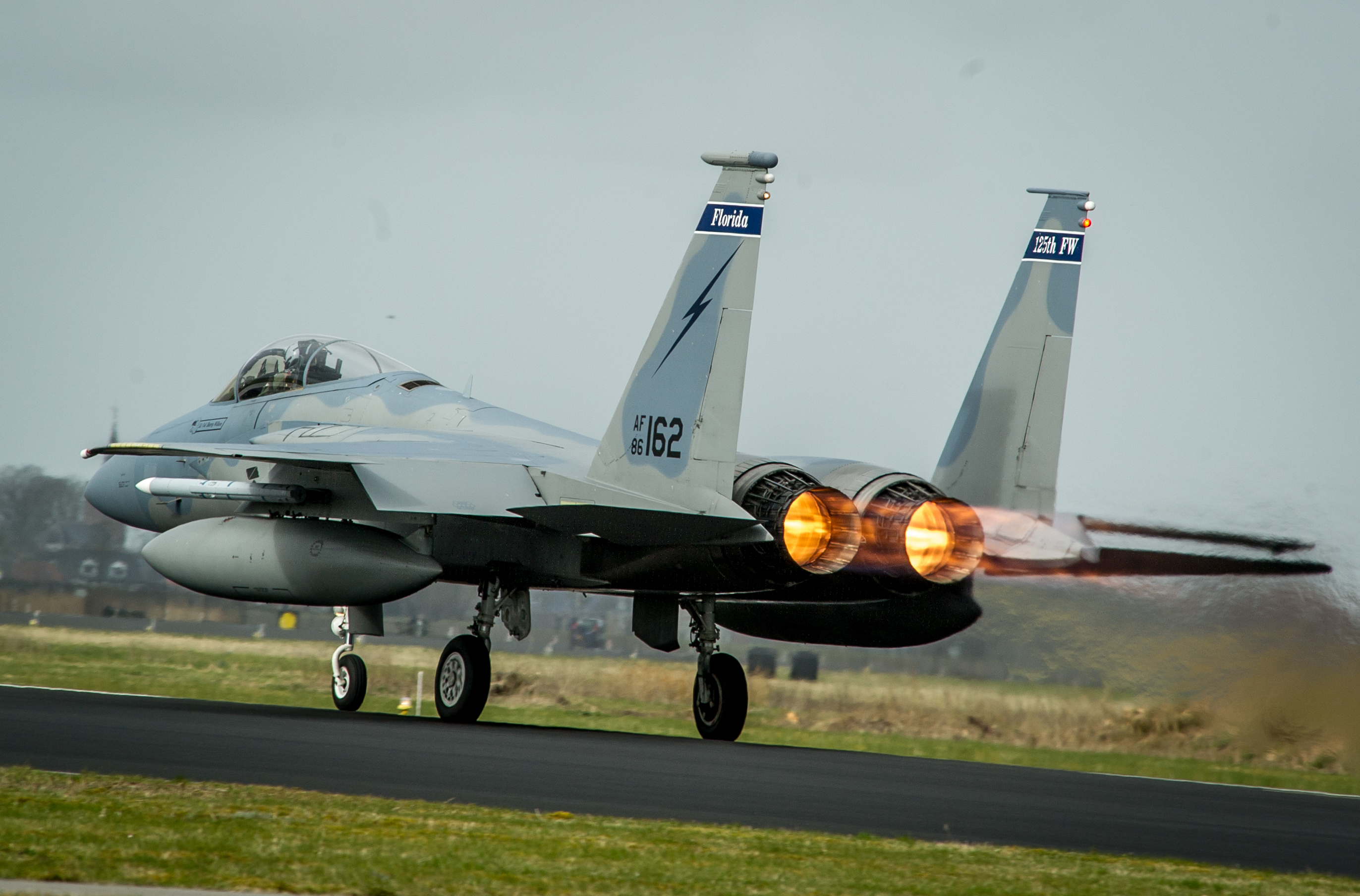
125th Fighter Wing F-15C Eagle taking off from Leeuwarden Air Base, 2015

The 125 FW was rated "Outstanding" during an Alert Force Evaluation by the North American Aerospace Defense Command Inspector General in November 1997. This was the highest rating ever given by NORAD. In January 1998, the 125th Fighter Wing received an "Outstanding" on its Operational Readiness Inspection (ORI). During this period, the wing also participated in Operation Southern Watch, routinely deploying to Prince Sultan Air Base, Saudi Arabia for operational relief of Regular Air Force F-15C/D units. In 2000, the wing began transitioning to the F-15A/B Multistage Improvement Program (MSIP) variant of the F-15A and F-15B Eagle, and in 2006 transitioned again to the newer F-15C and F-15D models of the Eagle that it currently flies. In 2020, the 125 FW was awarded the Air Force Meritorious Unit Award by ACC.

As the 125 FIG, the unit also operated and maintained a single C-131 Samaritan as an Operational Support Airlift (OSA) aircraft until the late 1980s. As the 125 FIG, 125 FG and 125 FW, the unit subsequently operated a single C-130E Hercules, followed by a single WC-130H Hercules aircraft (the latter with weather reconnaissance equipment removed) for logistical support of the wing, geographically separated units (GSUs) of the Florida Air National Guard, and additional "as needed" airlift support to the Florida Army National Guard. This capability is currently gapped in the Florida Air National Guard until another similar support aircraft can be assigned with fixed-wing aviation elements of the Florida Army National Guard currently providing principal OSA assets from an aviation support facility in St. Augustine. The 125 FW also operates a single RC-26B Metroliner reconnaissance aircraft in support of state and federal law enforcement agencies under Title 32 USC authority.

In November 2014, in order to comply with Air Force Instruction 38-101, several geographically separated units (GSUs) of the Florida Air National Guard were administratively realigned under the 125th Fighter Wing. These included the 114th Space Control Squadron at Patrick Space Force Base, the 290th Joint Communications Support Squadron at MacDill AFB and the 202nd RED HORSE Squadron, 159th Weather Flight and 131st Training Flight at Camp Blanding. The 101st Air and Space Operations Group and HQ FLANG Detachment 1 at Tyndall AFB were unaffected by these changes.

The 249th Special Operations Squadron was activated at Hurlburt Field on 28 August 2020. The squadron is an Associate unit operating active duty CV-22B Osprey belonging to the 1st Special Operations Wing and is operationally gained by Air Force Special Operations Command (AFSOC). Upon its establishment, the 249 SOS was also administratively aligned under the 125 FW per AFI 38-101.

Medical and other support personnel of the 125 FW were heavily involved with the COVID-19 pandemic response in the State of Florida. Just months after their de-mobilization from the COVID-19 support, the unit was deployed in support of Operation Allies Refuge under OPCON of Air Combat Command.

On 27 July 2021, the Department of the Air Force signed a Record of Decision announcing that the 125 FW will eventually receive twenty F–35A Lightning II aircraft to replace its extant F-15Cs and F-15Ds. Historically, an air defense/air superiority unit focused on an air-to-air mission; this change will necessitate the 125 FW also becoming proficient in an air-to-ground mission and associated air-to-ground ordnance employment for the first time in over seventy years.

On 15 Jan 2023, an additional group level organization, the 125th Regional Support Group (125 RSG) was established within the 125 FW as a geographically separated unit (GSU) at the Camp Blanding Joint Training Center. The 125 RSG will have oversight of all FLANG squadrons and flights at Camp Blanding, as well as the 290 JCSS at MacDill AFB. Other GSU elements of the 125 FW will continue to remain under the 125 OG pursuant to AFI 38-101.

The 125 FW continues to regularly participates in Red Flag events at the USAF Warfare Center at Nellis AFB, Nevada, and the exercise Sentry Savannah and the William Tell air-to-air weapons meet at the Georgia Air National Guard's Air Dominance Center at Savannah ANGB as part of its ongoing readiness program.

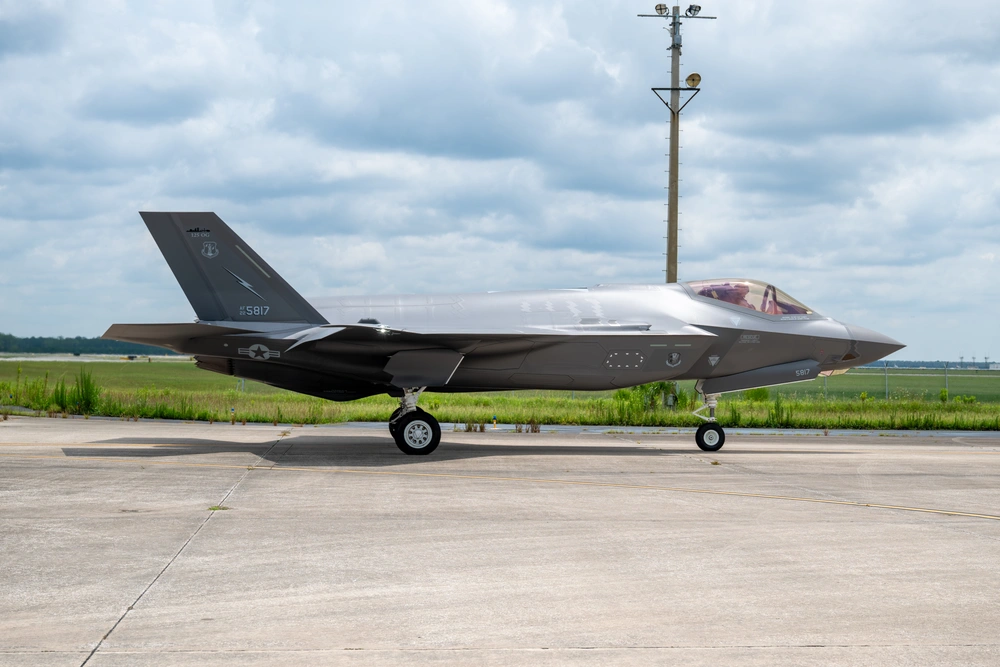
An F-35A Lightning II from the 125th Fighter Wing with markings for the Commander, 125th Operations Group

.

The 125 FW's last F-15C departed Jacksonville ANGB on 14 Aug 2024 and the first F-35A aircraft arrived on 4 March 2025. The 125 FW is currently continuing its transition to the new aircraft.

== Lineage ==
- Established as the 125th Fighter Group (Air Defense) and allotted to the Air National Guard

Activated and Federally recognized on 1 July 1956
Redesignated 125th Fighter-Interceptor Group c. January 1972
Redesignated 125th Fighter Group on 15 March 1992
Redesignated 125th Fighter Wing on 1 October 1995

=== Assignments ===
- Florida Air National Guard, 1 July 1956 – present

Gained by: 35th Air Division, Air Defense Command
Gained by: Montgomery Air Defense Sector, Air Defense Command, 1 July 1960
Gained by: 32d Air Division, Air Defense Command, 1 April 1966
Gained by: 32d Air Division, Aerospace Defense Command, 15 January 1968
Gained by: 20th Air Division, Aerospace Defense Command, 1 January 1970
Gained by: Air Defense, Tactical Air Command (ADTAC), 1 October 1979
Gained by: Southeast Air Defense Sector (SEADS), First Air Force, 1 July 1987
Gained by: Southeast Air Defense Sector (ANG), Florida ANG, 1 October 1995
Gained by: Northeast Air Defense Sector (NEADS), First Air Force, 1 November 2005
Gained by: Eastern Air Defense Sector (EADS), First Air Force, 15 July 2009

=== Components ===
- 125th Operations Group, 1 October 1995 – present
- 159th Fighter-Interceptor (later 159th Fighter Squadron), 1 July 1956 – 1 October 1995

=== Stations ===
- Jacksonville Imeson Airport, Florida, 1 Jul 1956–1968
- Jacksonville International Airport, Florida, 1968–present
  - Designated: Jacksonville Air National Guard Base, Florida, 1991–present

=== Aircraft ===
- F-86D Sabre Interceptor (1956–1960)
- C-54D Skymaster* (approx. 1960–1975)
- C-131D Samaritan* (1975–1990)
- T-33A Shooting Star** (approx. 1960–1995)
- F-102A/B Delta Dagger (1960–1974)
- F-106A/B Delta Dart (1974–1987)
- F-16A/B/ADF Fighting Falcon (1987–1995)
- C-130E & WC-130H Hercules* (1990–2012)
- RC-26B Metroliner (1997–2023)
- F-15A/B Eagle (1995–2006)
- F-15C/D Eagle (2006–2024)
- F-35A Lightning II (March 2025 – present) (Note: Aircraft indicated by * were Operational Support Aircraft in support of fighter mission.) (Note: Aircraft indicated by ** were Pilot Proficiency and Practice "bogey" aircraft in support of fighter mission.)
