= Florida Air National Guard =

Military unit of the US state

- Emblem of the Florida Air National Guard
- Active: 9 February 1947 - present
- Country: United States
- Allegiance: Florida
- Branch: Air National Guard
- Type: State militia, military reserve force
- Role: "To meet state and federal mission responsibilities."
- Part of: Florida National Guard; United States National Guard Bureau; National Guard
- Garrison/HQ: Florida Air National Guard, St. Francis Barracks, 82 Marine Street Street, St. Augustine, Florida 32088
- Mottos: "Guarding America, Defending Freedom"

Commanders
- Civilian leadership: President Donald Trump (Commander-in-Chief); Troy Meink (Secretary of the Air Force); Ron DeSantis (Governor of Florida)
- State military leadership: Brig Gen Richard L. Coffey (Commander); Brig Gen Matthew J. French (Chief of Staff); CCM Matthew R. Smith (Command Chief)

Aircraft flown
- Fighter: F-15C/D Eagle, F-35A Lightning II
- Reconnaissance: RC-26B Metroliner
- Transport: CV-22B Osprey

The Florida Air National Guard (FL ANG) is the aerial militia of the U.S. state of Florida. It is a reserve component of the United States Air Force (USAF) and along with the Florida Army National Guard (FL ARNG), an element of the Florida National Guard. It is also an element of the Air National Guard (ANG) at the national level, falling in with the Army National Guard (ARNG) as part of the greater United States National Guard under the National Guard Bureau (NGB).

As a USAF organization, the Florida Air National Guard is also part of the USAF's Air Reserve Component (ARC), a position it shares with its "federal" ARC partner, the Air Force Reserve Command (AFRC).

As state militia units, the units in the Florida Air National Guard are not in the normal United States Air Force chain of command. FL ANG units remain under the jurisdiction of the governor of Florida through the office of the Florida adjutant general, also known as the "TAG," unless they are federalized by order of the president of the United States. This jurisdictional model of answering to state, commonwealth or territorial governors applies to all ANG units in all fifty states, Puerto Rico, Guam and the U.S. Virgin Islands, with the sole exception being the District of Columbia Air National Guard, which is under the direct jurisdiction of the president of the United States through the office of the Commanding General, District of Columbia National Guard.

The Florida Air National Guard is headquartered at St. Francis Barracks (also known as the State Arsenal), in St. Augustine, and its commander is Brigadier General Richard L. Coffey.

== Overview ==
Under the "Total Force" concept, all Florida Air National Guard (FL ANG) units at the wing, group, squadron and flight level are considered to be part of the Air Reserve Component (ARC) of the United States Air Force (USAF). FL ANG units are trained and equipped by the Air Force, maintain the same readiness standards as Regular Air Force and Air Force Reserve units, and are operationally gained by a major command of the USAF (MAJCOM) or, in the case of the FL ANG's 114th Space Control Squadron (114 SPCS), to the United States Space Force (USSF), if federalized. In addition, the Florida Air National Guard forces are assigned to Air Expeditionary Forces and are subject to deployment tasking orders along with their active duty and Air Force Reserve Command counterparts in their assigned cycle deployment window.

Along with their federal reserve obligations, as state militia units on par with the Florida Army National Guard, the elements of the Florida Air National Guard are subject to being activated by order of the governor of Florida to provide protection of life and property, and preserve peace, order and public safety. State missions include disaster relief in times of hurricanes, floods, forest fires and wildfires, search and rescue, protection of vital public services, Defense Support of Civil Authorities (DSCA), and support to civil defense.

== Components ==
The Florida Air National Guard comprises the following major units:

Line unit functions and capabilities:

- 125th Fighter Wing (125 FW)

Established 9 February 1947 (as the 159th Fighter Squadron); operates the F-15C/D Eagle, F-35A Lightning II plus the RC-26B Metroliner
Stationed at: Jacksonville Air National Guard Base, Jacksonville
Operationally Gained by: Air Combat Command (ACC)

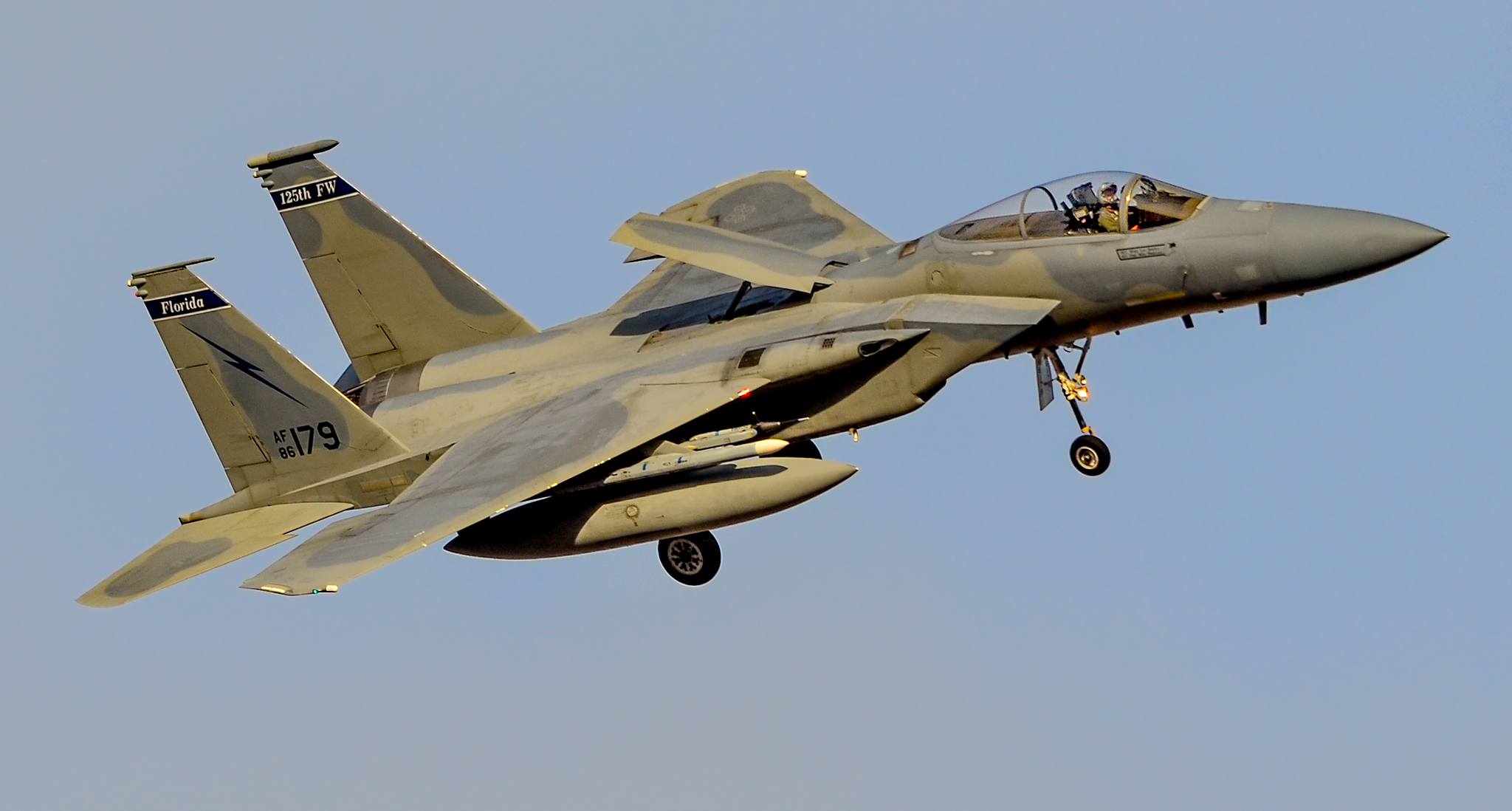
F-15C Eagle of the 125th Fighter Wing, February 8, 2017.

As a unit of the First Air Force (1 AF) and AFNORTH, the 125 FW performs an air defense mission for United States Northern Command (USNORTHCOM) and North American Aerospace Defense Command (NORAD) under the Continental NORAD Region (CONR) commander in peacetime, wartime, or in the event of national emergency, for the defense of the North American continent. The 125 FW is also available to other combatant commanders for forward deployment to perform air superiority/air dominance missions in other theaters outside of the United States, providing air superiority/air dominance as part of Air and Space Expeditionary Forces.

125th Fighter Wing Detachment 1 (125 FW Det 1)
Stationed at: Homestead Air Reserve Base, Homestead

Rotational F-15 aircraft, pilots and maintenance crews from the 125 FW at Jacksonville, manning FL ANG Operating Location Alfa Alfa (OL-AA), an air defense Alert Facility at Homestead ARB

Operationally Gained by: Air Combat Command (ACC)
Provides the Continental NORAD Region (CONR) commander with rapid response to invasions of the sovereign airspace of the southern United States and to respond with appropriate air defense measures.

- Detachment 1, HQ Florida Air National Guard / 33rd Fighter Wing Associate Unit (33 FW AU)

Stationed at: Tyndall Air Force Base, Panama City
Operationally Gained by: Air Education and Training Command (AETC)
As Det 1, HQ FLANG / 325th Fighter Wing Associate Unit, the unit previously provided instructor pilot augmentation to the active duty 325th Fighter Wing (325 FW) at Tyndall AFB, training active duty Air Force, Air Force Reserve and Air National Guard personnel for the F-22A Raptor aircraft in the Air Dominance Role via the 325 FW's F-22 Formal Training Unit (FTU). Following the destruction at Tyndall AFB following Hurricane Michael in 2018, F-22 FTU training aircraft and flight operations temporarily shifted to Eglin AFB. With reassignment of the F-22 FTU mission to the 1st Fighter Wing at Joint Base Langley-Eustis, Virginia in 2023, Det 1 transitioned to F-35A instructor support of the 33rd Fighter Wing (33 FW) at Eglin AFB, an F-35A FTU.

- 101st Air and Space Operations Group (101 AOG)

Stationed at: Tyndall AFB, Panama City
Operationally Gained by: Air Combat Command (ACC)
Previously known as the Southeast Air Defense Sector (SEADS), the 101 AOG provides manning for First Air Force's 601st Air and Space Operations Center (601 AOC) for operational-level Command and Control (C2) of air and space forces and as the focal point for planning, directing, and assessing air and space operations within the CONUS NORAD Region (CONR) and USNORTHCOM.

- 114th Electromagnetic Warfare Squadron (114 EWS)

Stationed at Cape Canaveral Space Force Station, Cocoa Beach
Operationally Gained by: United States Space Force (USSF)
Previously activated as 114th Combat Communications Squadron under Air Combat Command, then redesignated as 114th Range Operations Squadron under Air Force Space Command (AFSPC), and lastly as the 114th Space Control Squadron (114th SPCS). Provides defensive and offensive counter-space and space situational awareness in support of global and theater campaigns. The 114 EWS became operationally gained by the United States Space Force in December 2020 following the inactivation of Air Force Space Command and the establishment of the U.S. Space Force.

- 249th Special Operations Squadron (249 SOS)

Established 2015 as Detachment 2, HQ Florida Air National Guard, operating the CV-22B Osprey; redesignated as the 249th Special Operations Squadron on 28 August 2020
Stationed at Hurlburt Field, Mary Esther
Operationally Gained by: Air Force Special Operations Command (AFSOC)
Previously activated in 2015 as Detachment 2, HQ Florida Air National Guard to support the active duty 1st Special Operations Wing's mission to rapidly plan, execute and sustain specialized air power. Past operations and activities have included support to numerous multilateral exercises and multiple named operations, to include Title 10 USC mobilization and combat flight operations while forward deployed in support of Operation Inherent Resolve. Activated as the 249 SOS on 28 August 2020. The 249 SOS is an "Associate" squadron, flying CV-22B aircraft assigned to the active duty 1st Special Operations Wing (1 SOW) and sharing operations with the active duty 8th Special Operations Squadron (8 SOS) at Hurlburt Field. Although operationally gained by AFSOC and the 1 SOW while in a Title 10 USC status, administrative control for the 249 SOS while in a Title 32 USC status remains with the 125 FW at Jacksonville ANGB.

Support Unit Functions and Capabilities:

- 125th Regional Support Group (125 RSG)

Stationed at Camp Blanding Joint Training Center, Starke
Operationally gained by: Air Combat Command (ACC)
Established in January 2023 as a group level entity under the 125 FW, the 125 RSG provides group level oversight of one non-flying FLANG squadron and two non-flying FLANG flights at Camp Blanding JTC (202 RHS, 159 WF, 131 TRF) and a second non-flying FLANG squadron at MacDill AFB (290 JCSS) to enhance readiness and better organize FLANG support-centered units under the USAF Agile Combat Employment (ACE) construct.

- 202d RED HORSE Squadron (202 RHS)

Stationed at Camp Blanding Joint Training Center, Starke
Operationally gained by: Air Combat Command (ACC)
As a Rapid Engineer Deployable Heavy Operational Repair Squadron (RED HORSE), the 202 RHS provides a highly mobile, rapidly deployable civil engineering response force, optimized to perform heavy damage repair for the recovery of airfields, other critical Air Force facilities, and associated military utility systems following enemy attack or natural disaster.

- 290th Joint Communications Support Squadron (290 JCSS)

Stationed at MacDill Air Force Base, Tampa
Operationally gained by: Air Mobility Command (AMC)
Provides Chairman of the Joint Chiefs of Staff-directed, globally deployable, enroute, and early entry communications support to geographic combatant commands, the United States Special Operations Command, individual U.S. armed services, other Department of Defense activities and combat support agencies, other U.S. Government agencies, and the state of Florida. The 290 JCSS is associated with the U.S. Transportation Command's (USTRANSCOM) Joint Enabling Capabilities Command (JECC) and the Joint Communications Support Element (JCSE). Because of JCSE's command relationship to JECC and JECC to USTRANSCOM, the squadron is operationally gained by the Air Mobility Command (AMC), the USAF component command of USTRANSCOM, in the 290 JCSS status as a USAF organization.

- 131st Training Flight (131 TF)

Stationed at: Camp Blanding Joint Training Center, Starke
Operationally gained by the Air Combat Command (ACC)
Previously known as the Air National Guard Weather Readiness Training Center (ANGWRTC), the 131 TRF trains and provides personnel to the Air National Guard and Air Force Reserve weather community.

- 159th Weather Flight (159 WF)

Stationed at: Camp Blanding Joint Training Center, Starke
Operationally gained by the Air Combat Command (ACC)
Trains wartime ready, professional teams to provide the highest quality meteorological services to varying national, state and local missions.

== History ==
On 24 May 1946, the United States Army Air Forces, in response to dramatic postwar military budget cuts imposed by President Harry S. Truman, allocated inactive unit designations to the National Guard Bureau for the formation of an Air Force National Guard. These unit designations were allotted and transferred to various State National Guard bureaus to provide them unit designations to re-establish them as Air National Guard units.

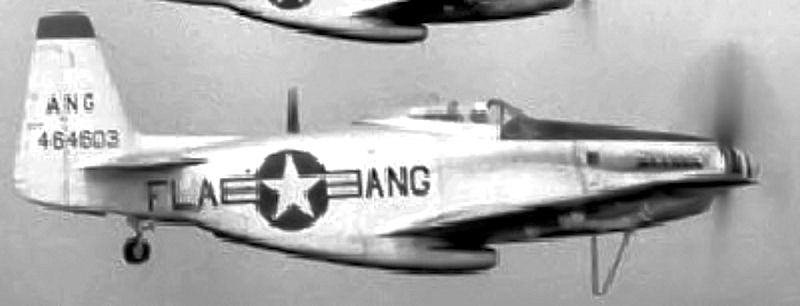
An F-51H Mustang of the 159th Fighter Squadron. The 159th FS operated the Mustang between 1947 and 1954.

A National Guard Bureau document dated 16 March 1946, gave states permission to request an Army Air Forces unit allotment. Months later, Florida accepted the 159th Fighter Squadron with an authorized strength of 50 officers and 303 enlisted men. The unit was established at Imeson Airport in Jacksonville and Governor Millard F. Caldwell formally accepted the unit on 30 August 1946. Full federal recognition of the unit was granted on 9 February 1947, when it became a National Guard unit under the U.S. Army Air Forces. However, 18 September 1947 is considered to be the Florida Air National Guard's official birth, concurrent with the establishment of the United States Air Force as a separate branch of the United States military under the National Security Act of 1947.

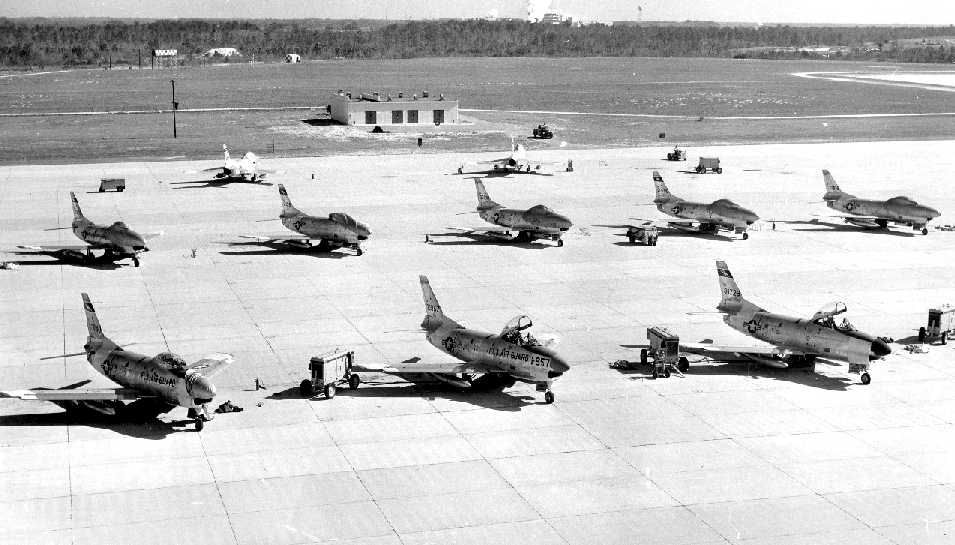
North American F-86L Sabres of the 159th Fighter Squadron at the FL ANG base at Imeson Airport, 1957

In 1954, the 159th relinquished their F-51s for F-80 Shooting Stars and in 1956 upgraded again to F-86 Sabres. On 1 July 1956, the 159th Fighter-Interceptor Squadron was authorized to expand to a group level organization and the 125th Fighter-Interceptor Group (125 FIG) was established by the National Guard Bureau, with the 159 FIS becoming the group's flying squadron. Both organizations remained operationally gained by the Air Defense Command (ADC) and in 1960 transitioned to the F-102 Delta Dagger.

In 1968, ADC was renamed Aerospace Defense Command and remained the 125 FIG's gaining command. That same year, the 125 FIG and its F-102 aircraft relocated from the soon-to-be closing Imeson Airport to a newly constructed military installation at the new Jacksonville International Airport. This was followed by another aircraft transition in 1974 to the F-106 Delta Dart.

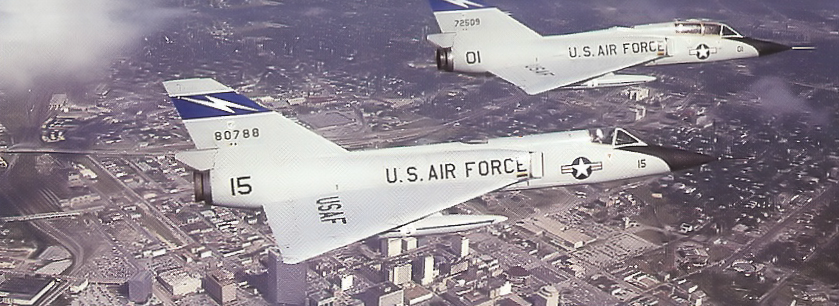
A Convair F-106B Delta Dart and an F-106A of the then-125th Fighter-Interceptor Group

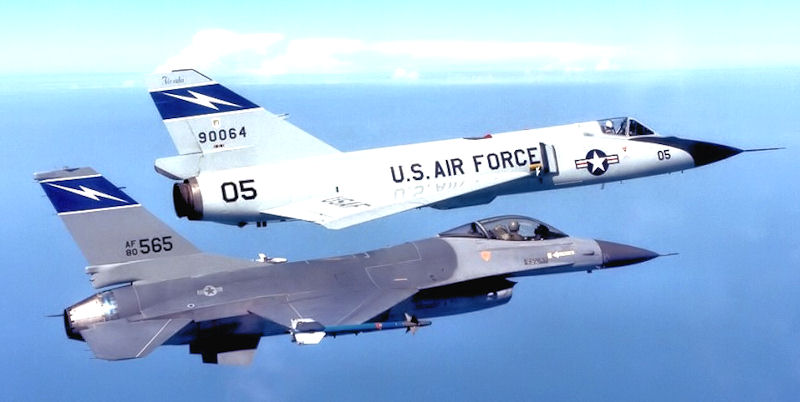
An F-106A and F-16A of the then-125th Fighter-Interceptor Group, 1987

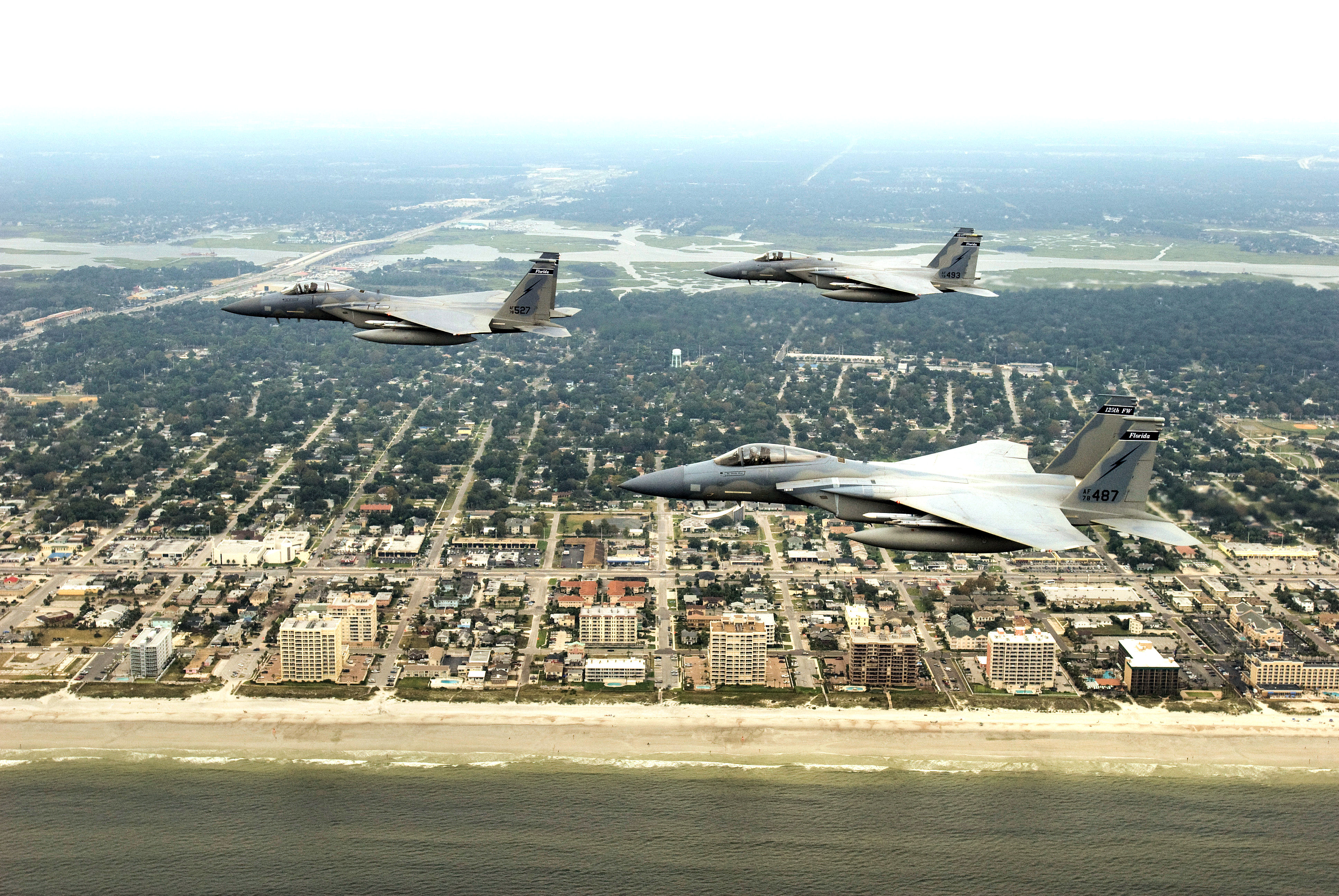
F-15C Eagles of the 125th Fighter Wing over Jacksonville Beach, 2009

With the disestablishment of ADC in October 1979, operational claimancy of the 125 FIG was shifted to Tactical Air Command (TAC) and the unit transitioned to the F-16 Fighting Falcon in its F-16A and F-16B Air Defense Fighter (F-16 ADF) variant in 1987. With the disestablishment of TAC in 1992, the 125 FIG was renamed the 125th Fighter Group (125 FG) and in October 1995 it was expanded to a wing level organization and renamed the 125th Fighter Wing (125 FW), operationally gained by Air Combat Command (ACC). The same year, the 125th also transitioned from the F-16 to the F-15A and F-15B Eagle. This was followed by later transition to the F-15A and F-15B Eagle Multi-Stage Improvement Program (MSIP) aircraft, and then to the F-15C and F-15D Eagle aircraft that the 125 FW continues to fly today.

Another Florida ANG flying unit, originally designated as Detachment 1, Southeast Air Defense Sector (Det 1, SEADS), is the 325th Fighter Wing Associate Unit (325 FW AU), which was officially activated on 1 October 1999 at Tyndall Air Force Base, Florida. The unit's initial mission was to train active duty and Air National Guard pilots to fly the F-15 Eagle in its F-15A/B and F-15C/D variants in the air dominance role. The Associate Unit members were completely integrated into all aspects of the active duty 2nd, 43rd, and 95th Fighter Squadrons, as well as the 325th Operations Support Squadron. Today, the unit continues that mission training responsibility for active duty Air Force, Air Force Reserve and Air National Guard pilots to fly the F-22 Raptor in the air dominance role. The associate unit is operationally controlled by the 325th Operations Group under the overall direction of the 325th Fighter Wing.

After the September 11th, 2001 terrorist attacks on the United States, elements of every Air National Guard unit in Florida have been activated in support of the global war on terrorism. Flight crews, aircraft maintenance personnel, communications technicians, air controllers and air security personnel were also engaged in Operation Noble Eagle air defense overflights of major United States cities. Florida ANG units have been deployed overseas as part of Operation Enduring Freedom in Afghanistan and Operation Iraqi Freedom in Iraq, as well as other overseas locations as directed.

== See also ==
- Florida State Guard
- Florida Wing Civil Air Patrol
