= 202d RED HORSE Squadron =

- Active: 1985 – present
- Country: United States
- Allegiance: Air National Guard
- Branch: United States Air Force
- Garrison/HQ: Camp Blanding, Florida

The United States Air Force's 202d RED HORSE squadron (202 RHS) is a civil engineering unit of the Florida Air National Guard located at Camp Blanding, Florida. The acronym RED HORSE is derived from "Rapid Engineer Deployable Heavy Operational Repair Squadron Engineers" and are a key element of the capabilities of the broader USAF civil engineering community. If mobilized to active duty with the U.S. Air Force, the squadron is operationally-gained by the Air Combat Command (ACC).

== Mission ==
- The mission of the 202 RHS is to provide a highly mobile, rapidly deployable, USAF civil engineering force that is self-sufficient for worldwide deployment to execute heavy damage repair of facilities, utility systems and aircraft launch and recovery ranging from established major air bases to austere forward operating bases (FOB).

== History ==
- January 1985 – 202nd RED HORSE Squadron activated at Camp Blanding, Florida.
- Spring / Summer 1998 – 202 RHS is placed on State Active Duty (SAD) to combat wildfires in Florida.
- July 2002 – 202 RHS was deployed to Jamaica to assist in the building of a clinic.
- August 2004 – October 2004 – 202 RHS and 203 RHS provide support across Florida in response to Hurricanes Charley, Frances and Ivan.
- 202 RHS and 203 RHS was deployed to Camp Darby, Italy to support depot storage.
- August 2005 – 202 RHS deployed to Mississippi and Louisiana as a relief force in response to Hurricane Katrina.
- November 2014 – In order to comply with Air Force Instruction 38-101, several units of the Florida Air National Guard were administratively realigned under the 125th Fighter Wing (125 FW) as geographically separated units (GSUs) of the 125 FW as the new parent wing. This included administrative assignment of the 202 RHS to the 125 FW.
- October 2020 – May 2021 – Over 100 members of the 202 RHS were mobilized to federal active duty and forward deployed to Al Udeid Air Base, Qatar in support of Operations FREEDOM'S SENTINEL. During this eight-month deployment, the squadron accomplished multiple air base/air facility, hangar, runway and other heavy engineer repair and construction projects throughout the U.S. Central Command area of responsibility.

== Assignments ==
- Florida Air National Guard – 1985–present

== Major command/gaining command ==
- Tactical Air Command (TAC) 1985–1992
- Air Combat Command (ACC) 1993–present

== Bases stationed ==
- Camp Blanding Joint Training Center, Florida (Jan 1985 – present)
