= Imeson Field =

Airport in Jacksonville, FL, US, closed in 1968

Imeson Field Jacksonville – Thomas Cole Imeson Municipal Airport
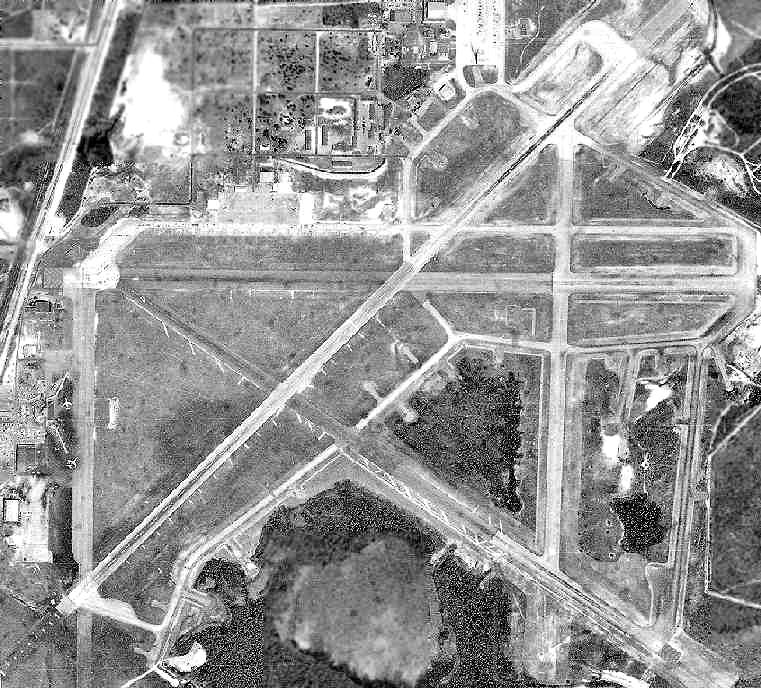
- 1966 USDA aerial photo
- IATA: *JIF; ICAO: *KJIF; FAA LID: *JIF

Summary
- Airport type: Military/Public
- Serves: Jacksonville, Florida
- Location: Jacksonville, Florida
- Opened: October 11, 1927
- Closed: October 31, 1969
- Passenger services ceased: October 27, 1968
- Elevation AMSL: 20 ft (6.1 m)
- Coordinates: 30°25′12″N 081°38′24″W

Map
- Interactive map of Imeson Field; Jacksonville – Thomas Cole Imeson Municipal Airport

Runways
Direction	Length		Surface
Direction	ft	m	Surface
05 / 23	7,959	2,425	Concrete
09 / 27	7,003	2,134	Concrete
12 / 30	7,005	2,135	Concrete
18 / 36	4,200	1,280	Concrete
- Previously assigned IATA/ FAA: JAX, ICAO: KJAX. Changed following opening of Jacksonville International Airport in late 1968.

Imeson Field, also known as Jacksonville Imeson Airport, was the primary airport serving Jacksonville, Florida from 1927 until 1968. It was known as Jacksonville Municipal Airport prior to World War II, Jacksonville Army Airfield when the United States Army Air Forces controlled the facility during World War II, and at its closing the airport was Jacksonville – Thomas Cole Imeson Municipal Airport.

== History ==
=== Origins ===
Jacksonville Municipal Airport was built southeast of the intersection of North Main Street (U.S. 17) and Busch Drive, the site of a 175-acre (71 ha) prison farm north of downtown Jacksonville. Originally it had a 2,100-foot cinder and shell runway, a 2,500-foot grass runway, a small wooden administration building with a fireplace and a bedroom for the day and night manager, receptionist, mechanic and “gas boy”. The hangar was built with old telephone poles and roofing made using surplus corrugated steel sheets from other city construction projects.

By 1934 the Department of Commerce Airport Directory said Jacksonville Airport had four "sandy, sodded, surfaced" runways, all 2,500 feet long, with a row of hangars on the side of the airfield. The manager was listed as Major Herbert A. Macloney.

Jacksonville Municipal Airport Number One opened on October 11, 1927. A dedication ceremony prior to the opening included Charles Lindbergh, who flew to Jacksonville in the "Spirit of St. Louis" to promote the new airport and Jacksonville's aviation industry. His arrival the day before was greeted by an enormous crowd, estimated at 150,000. The city's population at the time was only 129,500. Aviation was still considered a novelty, but he assured city leaders that air passenger service would span the nation. Eastern Air Service (later known as Eastern Air Lines) was the first passenger airline at Jacksonville, beginning in 1931. The city attempted to name the airport after Lucky Lindy in 1927, but San Diego, California already had Lindbergh Field.

By 1941 the airport had expanded to 600 acres (240 ha) adding five hangars, a terminal building and five asphalt runways, the longest being 7,000 feet (2,100 m). Airlines were Atlanta-based Delta Air Lines (1924–present), Miami-based Eastern Airlines (1926–1991), United Airlines, National Airlines (1934–1980, which at one time made Jacksonville its headquarters), Boston-based Northeast Airlines and Atlanta-based Southern Airways (1949–1979). The first scheduled jet flights were Northeast Convair 880s in April–May 1961.

=== World War II ===
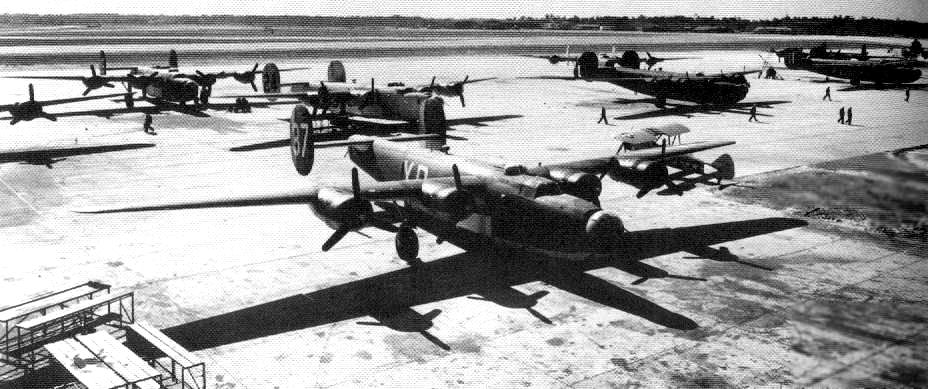
Navy PB4Y-1 Privateer patrol aircraft – Jacksonville AAF

As part of the buildup of forces prior to the United States entry into World War II, the Army Air Corps leased Imeson Field from the City of Jacksonville on 6 February 1941. Construction of military facilities at Jacksonville Army Airfield began on 5 April. It was assigned to I Bomber Command, First Air Force. A flight of the 16th Observation Squadron (Medium) was assigned with light observation aircraft with a mission of monitoring coastal airspace for Nazi U-boats. Jurisdiction was transferred to Army Air Forces Antisubmarine Command which assigned the 7th Antisubmarine Squadron in December 1942. Antisubmarine aircraft operated with A-20 Havoc light bombers and B-18 Bolo medium bombers equipped with submarine detection equipment.

The antisubmarine mission was turned over to the United States Navy in mid-1943, and Naval Auxiliary Air Station Jacksonville began to operate Consolidated PB4Y-1 (B-24D Liberator) long-range bombers from Jacksonville AAF equipped with antisubmarine equipment. The airfield was designated as Naval Auxiliary Air Station Jacksonville #1 by the Navy, however the base remained under Army Air Forces control. The improved PB4Y-2 long-range maritime patrol aircraft, designed by Consolidated specifically for Navy use began to arrive during the late summer of 1944. The base's maximum complement of 67 aircraft was reached in 1945.

A contract was initiated with National Airlines in July 1942 by AAF Training Command for National to conduct aircraft mechanics training courses to AAF personnel. With the antisubmarine mission being taken over by the Navy, Jacksonville AAF became an aircraft servicing base for the Army, with the Navy performing the operational missions as a tenant organization. On 31 August 1943 USAAF Antisubmarine Command returned to the control of First Air Force and Jacksonville AAF was transferred to Third Air Force jurisdiction, and became a sub-base of MacDill Army Airfield. It was subsequently transferred to control of Chatham Army Air Field, Georgia.

During 1944 and 1945 Air Service Command used Jacksonville AAF as a staging base for Station Complement squadrons prior to their overseas deployment. On 1 July 1944, the host unit, the 4203d Army Air Forces Base Unit (Aircraft Service) was re-designated the 4203d AAFBU (Air Base) as part of the transfer to Service Command. With the end of the war in Europe in May 1945, the Navy antisubmarine patrol aircraft were withdrawn, and Army personnel began to be reduced at airfield. Plans were made to return the airfield to civil control after the Japanese surrender in August 1945.

=== Postwar use ===
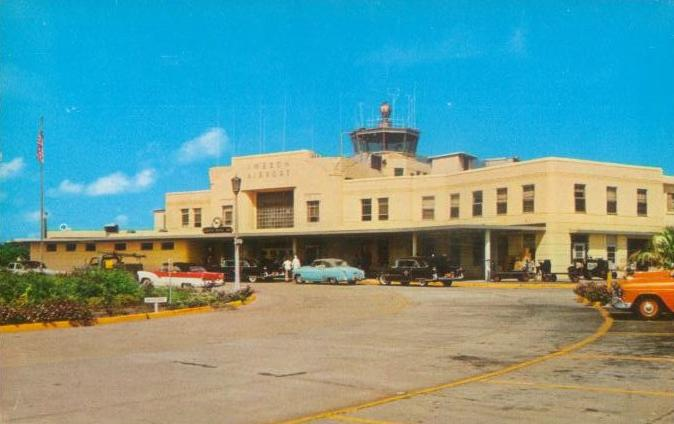
Imeson Airport in the 1950s

In the fall of 1945, jurisdiction of Jacksonville AAF was transferred to Air Technical Service Command (ATSC), whose mission was the transfer of any useful military equipment to other bases around the country. The base was closed and declared as surplus in 1946, being was turned over to the War Assets Administration (WAA) for disposal and return to civilian use.

==== Tom Imeson ====
Tom Imeson died in March, 1948. On July 26, 1948 the Jacksonville Municipal Airport was renamed Imeson Airport. It was named after Thomas Cole Imeson (1880–1948), a longtime city councilman whose visionary work led to the opening of the airport in the 1920s. He led an effort that Duval voters approved to fund a bond issue for airport improvements. The Florida legislature authorized it in 1925 and the first bonds were sold two years later. The proceeds paid for the first two runways. He later served as commissioner in charge of airports and highways and promoted improvements to its runways, hangars and terminal buildings. At the renaming ceremony, several hundred citizens attended as well as Collett E. Woolman, President of Delta Air Lines; Joe Dyer, President of Florida Airways; and Eddie Rickenbacker, President of Eastern Air Lines.

Imeson was originally a Pablo Beach city councilman who ran a curio business at the Beach. He became a Jacksonville city commissioner who had a strong interest in aviation. At the end of World War I, the United States airmail service was established. Delivery of air mail was much quicker than first class, but the Post Office Department required a formal airport, not just a vacant field which was the case with Paxon Field on the Westside. A group of 73 people met in December, 1924 to establish a local chapter of the National Aeronautic Association. Imeson was selected as president, and with the group's influence, land was cleared at the city prison farm for an airport.

==== Crash ====
An Eastern Airlines flight from Miami to Jacksonville crashed on December 21, 1955 while attempting to land in dense fog. All occupants died, including 12 passengers and a crew of 5. Pilot error was determined to be the cause of the tragedy.

With the appearance of jet airliners in 1959–60 the geography that precluded longer runways became a fatal liability. Jacksonville International Airport opened five miles to the north in 1968 with runways that could handle larger jet airliners; Imeson became a general aviation airport and closed .

Airport diagrams for 1955 and 1968

==== Florida Air National Guard ====
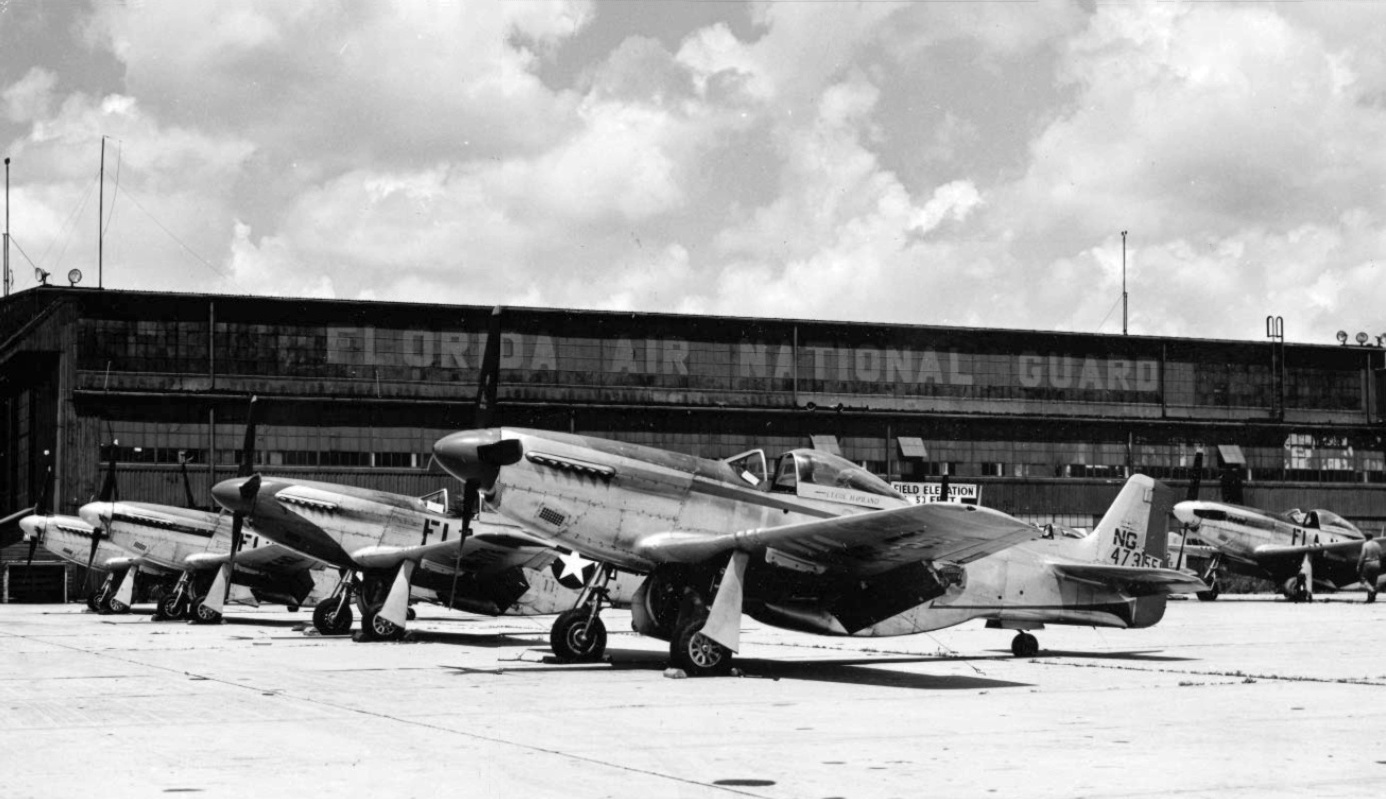
Florida Air National Guard F-51D Mustangs of the 159th Fighter Squadron at Imeson Airport circa 1947

With the closure of the base by Technical Service Command, a small portion of Jacksonville Army Airfield was transferred to the jurisdiction of Fourteenth Air Force on 15 December 1946 for subsequent use by postwar reserve forces. It became a reserve Air National Guard base under Air Defense Command. The Florida Air National Guard's 159th Fighter Squadron began operations at Imeson Field on 9 February 1947 with an initial strength of 18 personnel and flying P-51 Mustangs.

The unit was called to active duty on 10 October 1950 as a result of the outbreak of the Korean War. The unit was released from active duty on 9 July 1952; on 1 July 1956 the primary unit designation was changed to the 125th Fighter Interceptor Group. During the 1950s and 1960s the 125th FIG operated a variety of aircraft, including the F-80 Shooting Star, F-86 Sabre and F-102 Delta Dagger.

In 1968, the 125 FIG relocated from Jacksonville Imeson Airport to a newly constructed military installation at the newly constructed Jacksonville International Airport. With the concurrent closure of Imeson Airport and its conversion to an industrial park, the 125 FIG vacated their facilities and turned them over to the City of Jacksonville.

== Airline Service ==
In an era of multistop airline flights, JAX was busier than people nowadays would expect. The April 1957 Official Airline Guide shows 75 weekday departures: 41 Eastern, 22 National, 9 Delta and 3 Southern.

Capital Airlines began serving Imeson from Atlanta on October 26th, 1959 using Vickers Viscount 745's. Capital Airlines merged with United airlines in June 1961.

By the end of June 1968, Eastern was the largest carrier at Imeson with 35.6% of unplanned passengers, followed by National with 35.1%, Delta with 18.4%, United with 7.5%, Northeast with 2.6% and Southern with 0.8%

Imeson was also served by several charter and commuter carriers including but not limited to: Florida Airlines, Coastal Airlines, Shawnee Airlines Mackey International and Argonaut Airways

Delta, Eastern, and National all flew Douglas DC-8's, Boeing 727s and with the exception of National, Douglas DC-9s to Imeson. Northeast Airlines flew Convair 880s and 727s, United Airlines flew ex-Capital Viscount 700s and briefly Sud Aviation Caravelle IVs before moving to Boeing 720s and finally 727s. Eastern once served Imeson with Lockheed Constellations, Martin 404s, Douglas DC-7s and Lockheed L-188 Electras. National served Imeson as part of its short-haul network within Florida with Lockheed Lodestar, Convair 340's, Douglas DC-7 and Lockheed L-188 Electras.

The largest airliner scheduled to Imeson was the McDonnell Douglas DC-8-61 flown by Delta Air Lines.

== Imeson Industrial Park ==
In 1970, Webb International Inc. purchased the former 1,500-acre (6.1 km^{2}) airport and turned it into a new commerce center, Imeson International Industrial Park, with numerous buildings being constructed over the former runways.

The southeastern portion of Runway 30 has been reused as Imeson Park Boulevard.

== Historic notes ==
Local pilot Laurie Yonge offered airplane rides from the beaches. Rates were $5 for short hops, $10 for long rides, and $25 for aerobatics. His transport pilot license was the first issued in Florida, and his National Aeronautics Association card was signed by Orville Wright. It was Yonge, flying in the Spirit of Jacksonville, who dropped an invitation from the air to the deck of a ship returning Charles Lindbergh and his Spirit of St. Louis. On May 20, 1929, Yonge set the world's light plane endurance record in a 90 hp. Curtiss Robin. He flew continuously for 25 hours and 10 minutes, a record that stood until 1939. No other aviator has brought such fame and success to Jacksonville as a visionary pioneer and instructor pilot. A hangar at the northeast end of Imeson near North Main Street displayed Laurie Yonge's name until its demolition in the 1970s.

Famous passengers arriving at Imeson Field included John F. Kennedy, Richard Nixon and Rose Kennedy in 1960; Martin Luther King Jr.; and The Beatles in 1964.

== See also ==
- Florida World War II Army Airfields
