= Jacksonville International Airport =

Airport in Jacksonville, Florida, U.S.

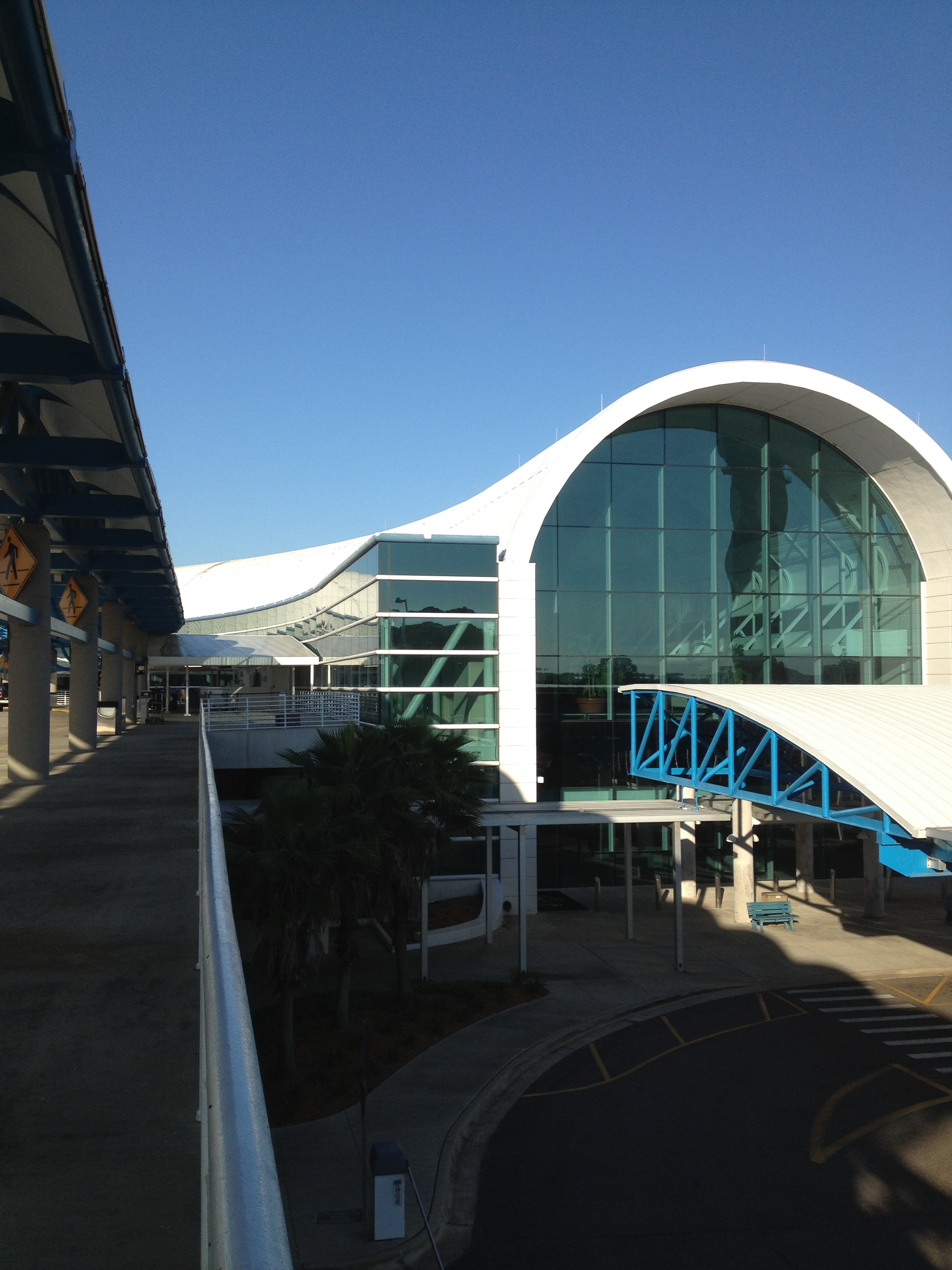
- IATA: JAX; ICAO: KJAX; FAA LID: JAX; WMO: 72206

Summary
- Airport type: Public / Military
- Owner/Operator: Jacksonville Aviation Authority
- Serves: Jacksonville metropolitan area
- Location: within Jacksonville city-county limits
- Opened: September 1, 1968; 58 years ago
- Time zone: EST (UTC−05:00)
  - Summer (DST): EDT (UTC−04:00)
- Elevation AMSL: 30 ft (9.1 m)
- Coordinates: 30°29′39″N 081°41′16″W
- Website: www.flyjax.com

Maps
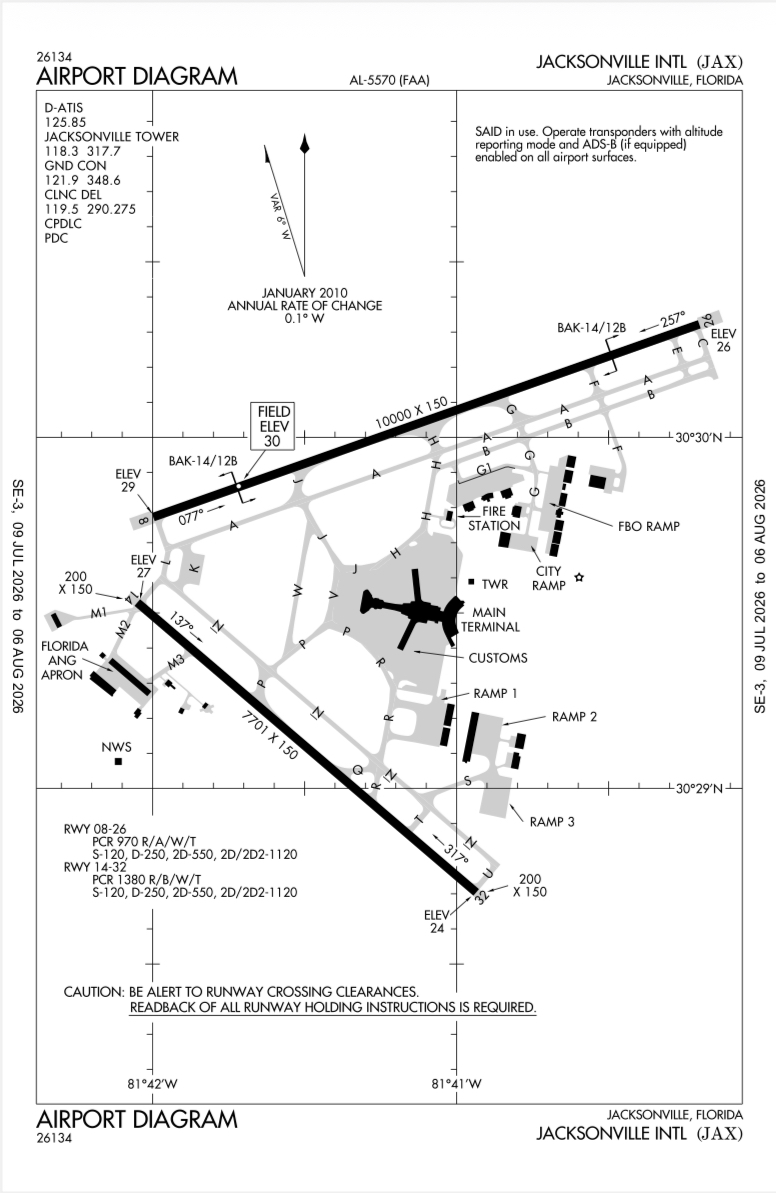
- FAA airport diagram
- Interactive map of Jacksonville International Airport

Runways
Direction	Length		Surface
Direction	ft	m	Surface
08/26	10,000	3,048	Concrete
14/32	7,701	2,347	Concrete

Statistics (2024/2025)
- Aircraft operations (year ending February 28, 2023): 99,616
- Passengers (fiscal year 2024/2025): 7,573,168
- Sources: FAA, airport website

Jacksonville International Airport (IATA: JAX, ICAO: KJAX, FAA LID: JAX) is a civil-military public airport 13 miles (21 km) north of Downtown Jacksonville, in Duval County, Florida, United States. It is owned and operated by the Jacksonville Aviation Authority.

== History ==
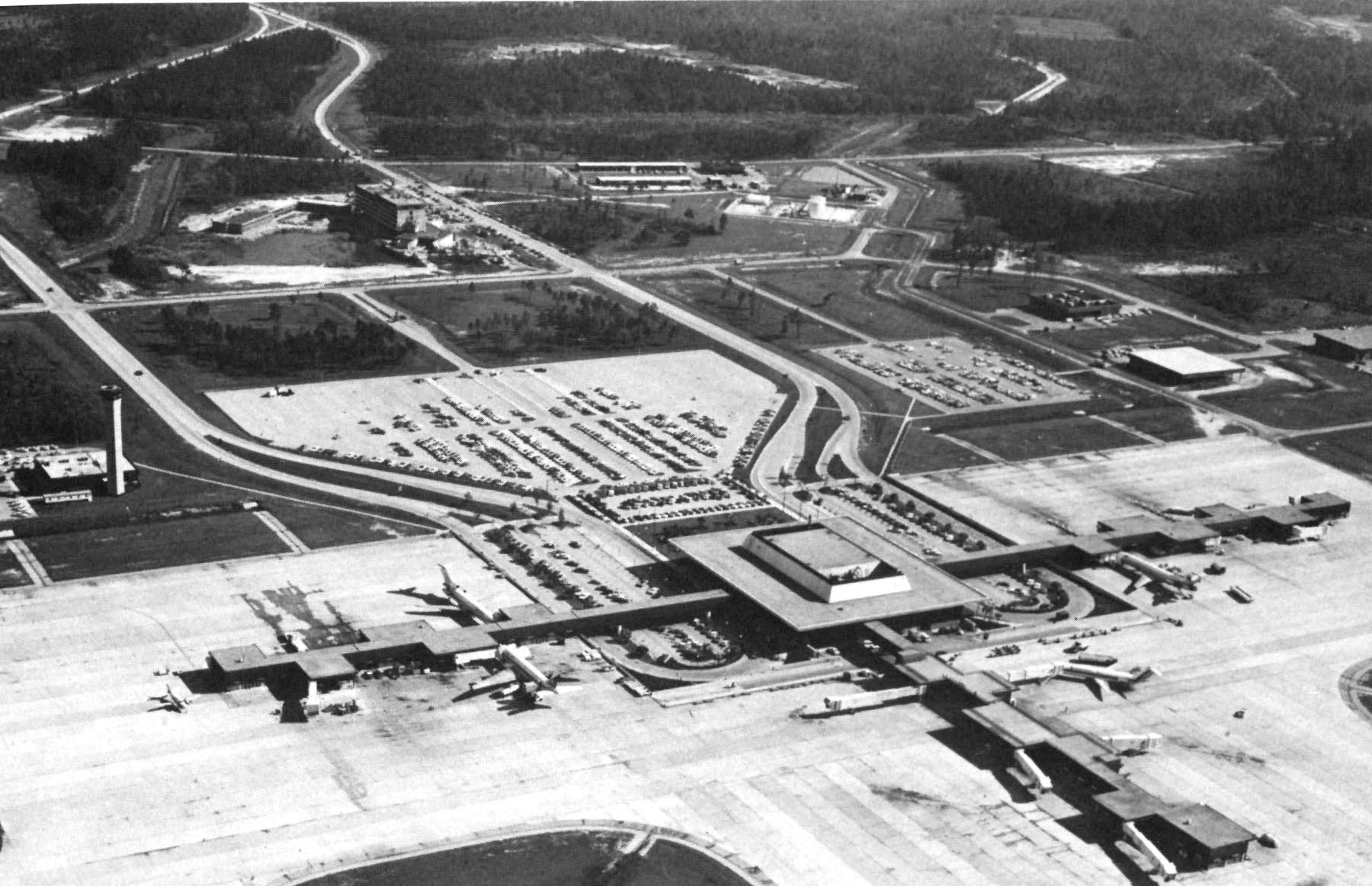
An overhead photo of Jacksonville International Airport circa 1968 showing separate areas for departing and arriving passengers on different sides of the terminal

Construction started in 1965 on a new airport to handle travel to nearby naval bases. The new airport was dedicated on September 1, 1968, replacing Imeson Field which carried the same IATA code of JAX. Terrain precluded lengthening the runways at Imeson, a necessity with the inception of commercial jet airliners. A new idea at JIA was separating departing and arriving passengers on different sides of the terminal. This is no longer the case, and the airport now uses the more typical layout with departing passengers on an upper level with an elevated roadway, and arriving passengers on the lower level.

The new airport was slow to expand, only serving two million passengers a year by 1982, but it served over five million annually by 1999 and an expansion plan was approved in 2000. The first phase, which included rebuilding the landside terminal, the central square and main concessions area, as well as consolidating the security checkpoints at one location and adding more parking capacity, was completed in 2004–2005. In 2007, 6,319,016 passengers were processed.

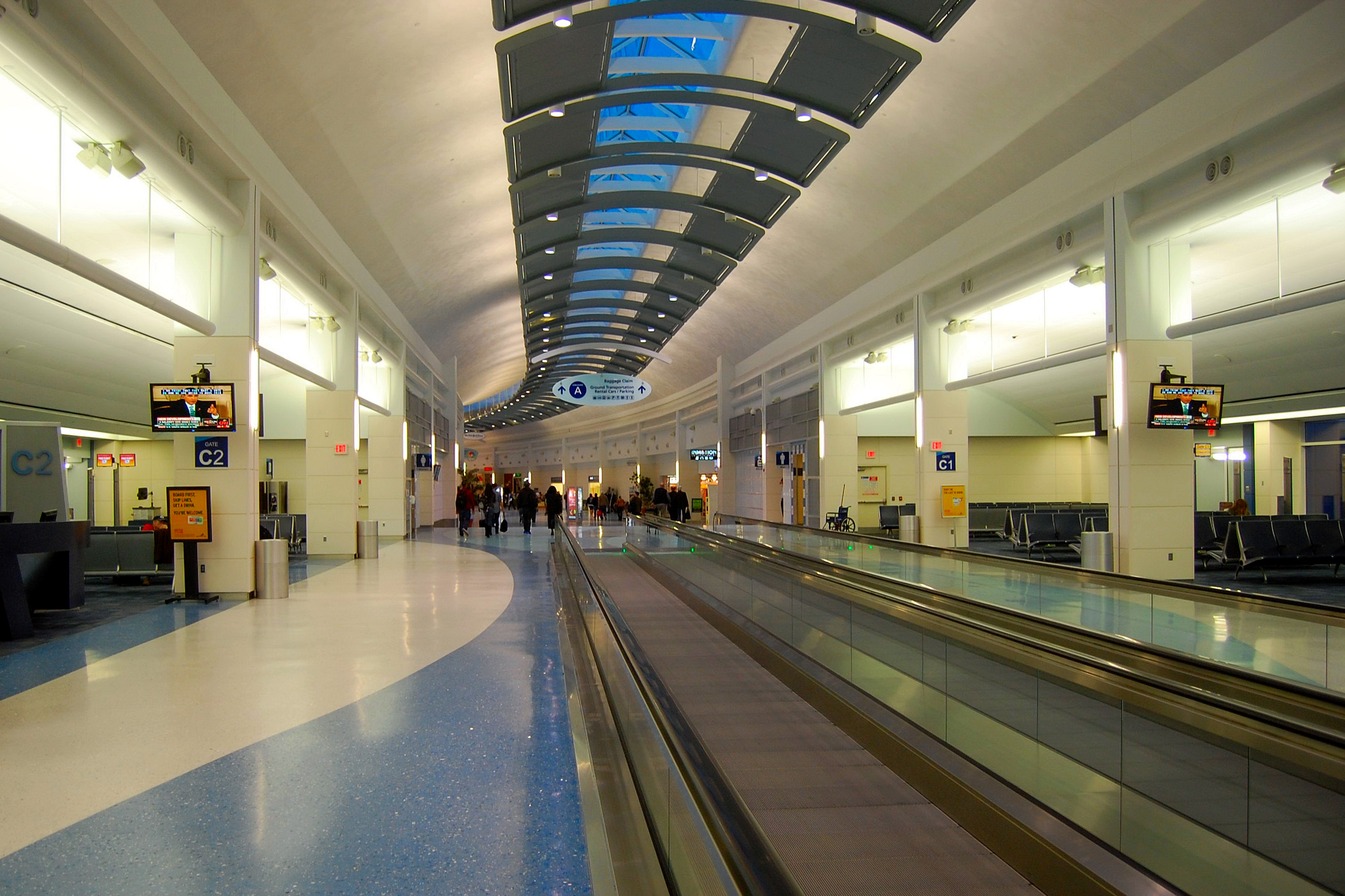
Concourse C

The second phase of the expansion program was carried out over three years, commencing in mid-2006 and projected to cost about $170 million. Concourses A and C were completely rebuilt; the former concourses were demolished. Work on Concourse B was given a low priority because the capacities of the rebuilt Concourses A and C were more than adequate for existing demand. The expansion was designed by Reynolds, Smith & Hills (RS&H).

The economic downturn of 2009 caused a decrease in passengers and flights. This led the JAA to commence the demolition of Concourse B in June 2009 because it was safer and easier for the contractor. After the debris was removed, asphalt was laid to provide space for ground equipment parking. The concourse was rebuilt in 2024 when passenger traffic increased, nearly doubling the square footage of the passenger terminal. A section of the old concourse eventually became part of an airline club lounge which opened in 2019.

== Expansion ==
In 2018, the airport handled 6,460,253 passengers, breaking the previous record set in 2007. 7,186,639 passengers were handled in 2019. This increase in traffic prompted the JAA to revive the plan to rebuild concourse B and in 2019 RS&H and Jacobs Engineering were chosen to perform the design, while Balfour Beatty was selected as the construction manager for the concourse B project. However, the project was put on hold again due to the COVID-19 pandemic and resulting decrease in passenger demand. By 2022 traffic recovered to over 6.5 million passengers annually and the expansion project was restarted. On May 10, 2024, ground was broken on the new Concourse B, which will house six new gates, with the ability to expand to up to 10 additional gates. The new concourse is scheduled to begin operations on January 28, 2027. The design of concourses A and C also allow them to be extended to accommodate additional gates.

== Operations ==
=== Facilities ===
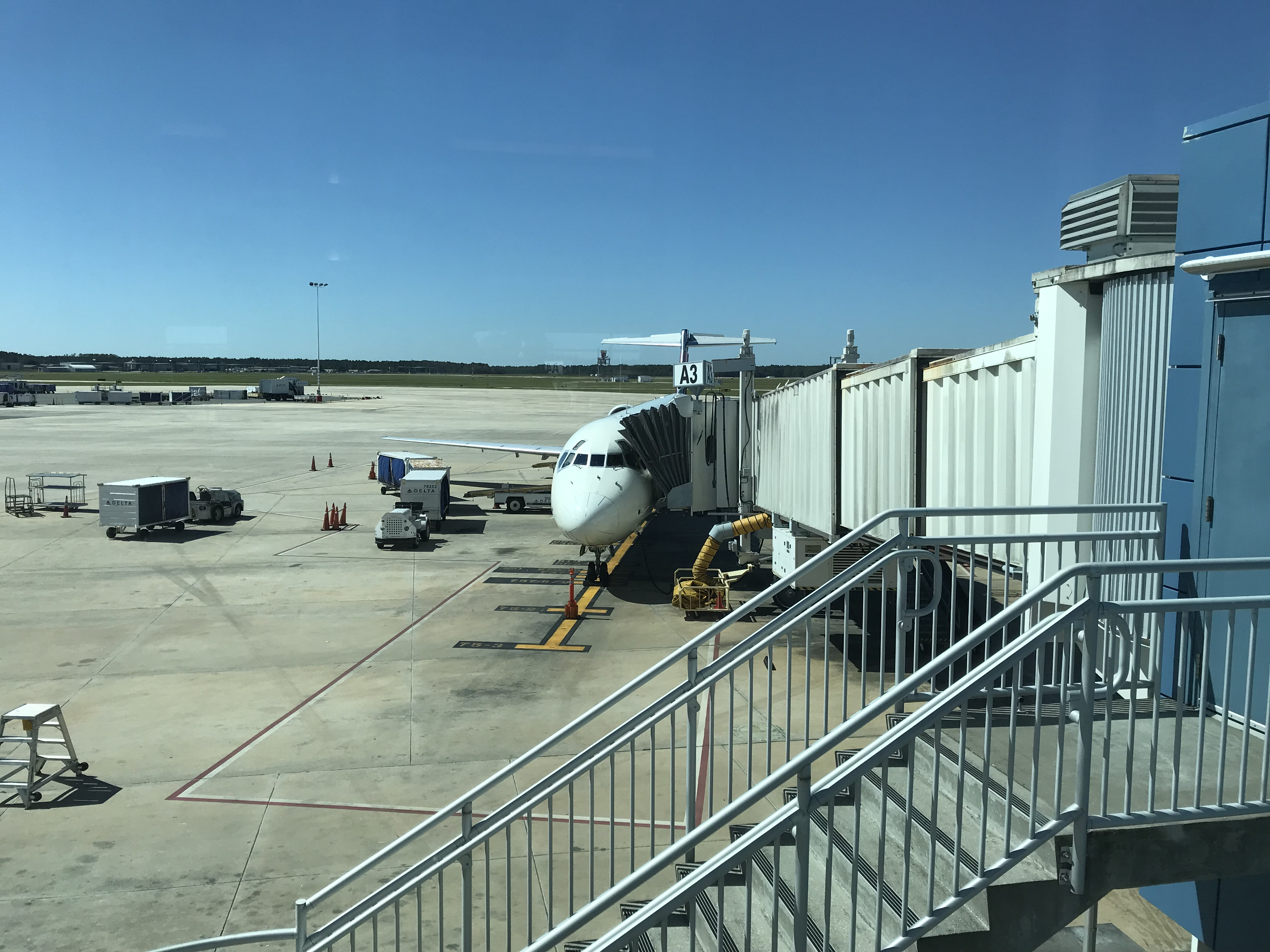
Gate A3

The airport covers 7,911 acres (3,201 ha) and has two concrete runways: 08/26, 10,000 x 150 ft (3,048 x 46 m) and 14/32, 7,701 x 150 ft (2,347 x 46 m). The terminal at JAX is composed of a baggage claim area, on the first floor and a ticketing area on the second floor, at the front of the structure. Past baggage claim and ticketing is the mezzanine, where shops, restaurants and the security checkpoint are located. Beyond the mezzanine are the airport's Concourses A and C, which include 10 gates each (for a total of 20), along with other shops and restaurants.

The airport also has a Delta Sky Club on Concourse A and a multi-airline passenger club located behind the airside food court.

There are three galleries located off of the main courtyard before the security checkpoint. One features an art exhibit, the second houses a revolving exhibit about a Jacksonville-area landmark or institution, and the third houses a permanent exhibit highlighting the history of aviation in the region.

In the year ending February 28, 2023, the airport had 99,616 aircraft operations, an average of 273 per day: 63% scheduled commercial, 19% general aviation, 14% air taxi and 4% military. In February 2023, there were 72 aircraft based at this airport: 3 single-engine and 3 multi-engine airplanes, 46 jet, and 20 military.

The airport has multiple fixed-base operators for transient general aviation aircraft. Besides fuel, the two offer services such as maintenance, catering, hangars, and courtesy and rental cars; there are also amenities such as internet, conference rooms, vending machines, crew lounges, snooze rooms, and showers.

==== Runways ====
The airport has two runways: 08/26 and 14/32, laid out in a "V" pattern (with the tip of the "V" pointing west). Originally, a plan existed to build two more runways, each next to one of the existing runways. However, the airport's latest master plan, introduced in 2020, proposed a different future layout. Instead of an additional runway alongside runway 14/32, a new 8000-foot runway would be built in the southwestern portion of the airport, offset from, but in a direction parallel to runway 08/26, the existing northern runway. The future runway will extend westwards from near the southern end of runway 14/23 and would require relocating Terrell Road. This plan would result in an airfield layout resembling an inverted "Z", which would allow for a traffic pattern that provides for simultaneous independent operations on the current runway 08/26 (which would be re-designated 08L/26R) and the future southern runway (08R/26L), while eliminating the directional conflict at the tip of the current "V" layout. The north and south parallel runways will be separated by distance of approximately 7,500 feet.

=== Military facilities ===
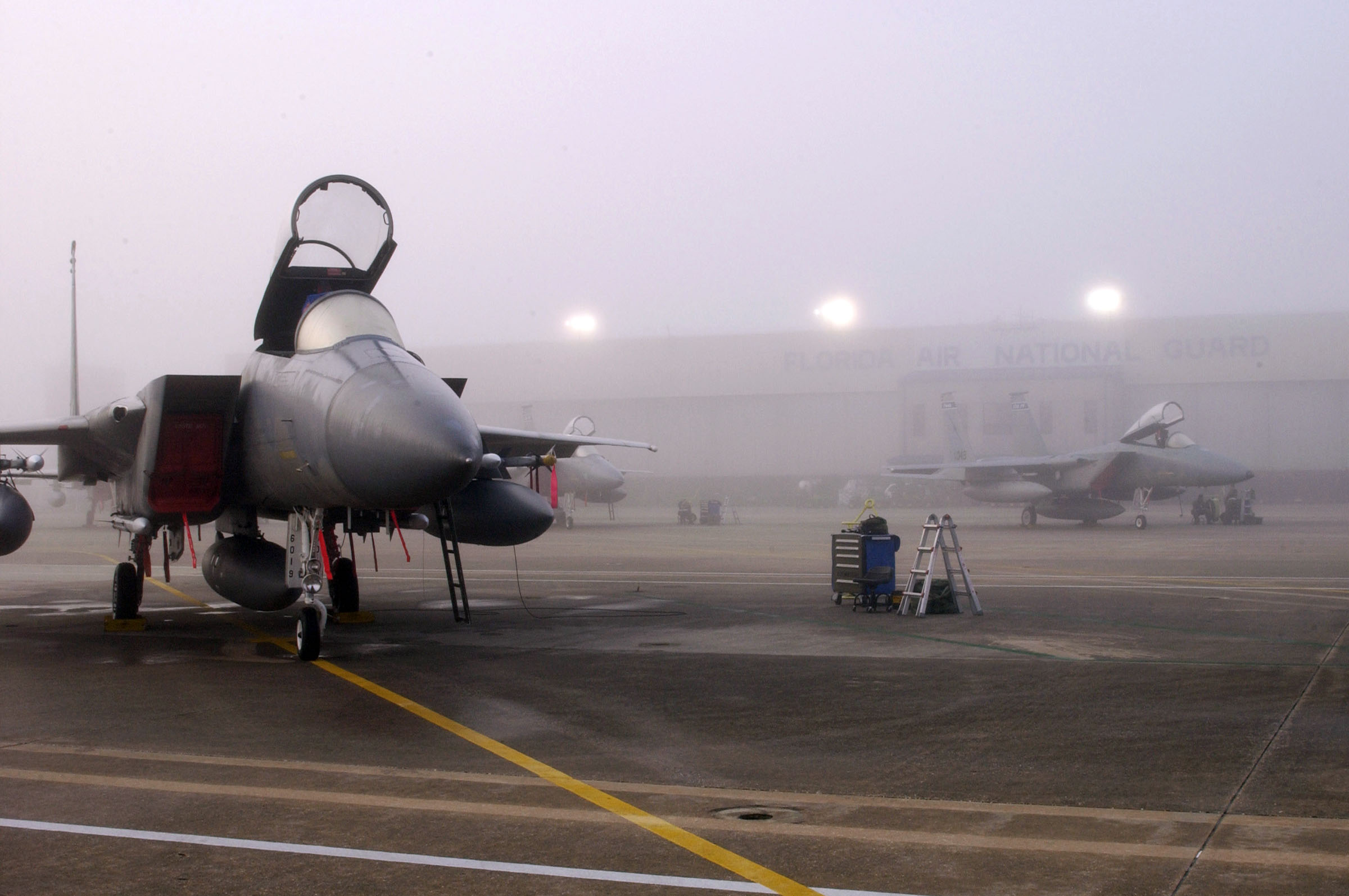
F-15C aircraft at Jacksonville Air National Guard Base

Concurrent with the closure of Imeson Airport, the 125th Fighter-Interceptor Group (125 FIG) of the Florida Air National Guard (FLANG) also relocated to Jacksonville International Airport with their then-F-102 Delta Dagger fighter aircraft and their then-sole C-54 Skymaster operational support aircraft.

Military Construction (MILCON) funds from the federal government provided for the establishment of Jacksonville Air National Guard Base in the southwest quadrant of the airport and placement of USAF-style emergency arresting gear on JAX's primary runway.

The 125 FIG was later redesignated the 125th Fighter Group (125 FG) and soon upgraded from group to wing status and redesignated as the 125th Fighter Wing (125 FW) in the early 1990s. The wing is the host unit for Jacksonville ANGB and previously operated F-15C and F-15D Eagle aircraft. Operationally-gained by the Air Combat Command (ACC), the 125 FW's first Lockheed Martin F-35A Lightning II aircraft arrived at Jacksonville ANGB on March 4, 2025 and the wing is currently transitioning to that aircraft.

Jacksonville ANGB is a small air force base, without the military housing, military hospital or other infrastructure of major U.S. Air Force installations. The Air National Guard provides a fully equipped USAF Crash Fire Rescue station to augment the airport's own fire department for both on-airport structural fires and aircraft rescue and firefighting (ARFF) purposes. The base employs approximately 300 full-time military personnel (ART and AGR) and 1,000 part-time military personnel who are traditional drill status guardsmen in the air national guard.

== Airlines and destinations ==
=== Passenger ===
Airlines	Destinations
Air Canada	Seasonal: Toronto–Pearson
Alaska Airlines	Seattle/Tacoma (begins June 24, 2027)
Allegiant Air	Akron/Canton, Cincinnati, Grand Rapids, Harrisburg, Indianapolis, Knoxville, Pittsburgh, Washington–Dulles; Seasonal: Belleville/St. Louis, Flint, Nashville
American Airlines	Charlotte, Dallas/Fort Worth, Miami, Philadelphia, Phoenix–Sky Harbor, Washington–National; Seasonal: Chicago–O'Hare
American Eagle	Chicago–O'Hare, Miami, New York–LaGuardia, Philadelphia, Washington–National
Avelo Airlines	New Haven
Breeze Airways	Akron/Canton, Fort Lauderdale, Hartford, Las Vegas, New Haven, Norfolk, Providence, Pittsburgh, Raleigh/Durham; Seasonal: Columbus–Glenn, Los Angeles, New Orleans, Richmond, San Diego
Delta Air Lines	Atlanta, Detroit, Minneapolis/St. Paul, New York–JFK
Delta Connection	Austin, Boston, New York–JFK, New York–LaGuardia
Frontier Airlines	Atlanta, Philadelphia, San Juan
JetBlue	Boston, Fort Lauderdale, New York–JFK, San Juan
Southwest Airlines	Austin, Baltimore, Chicago–Midway, Dallas–Love, Denver, Houston–Hobby, Nashville, St. Louis
Sun Country Airlines	Seasonal: Minneapolis/St. Paul
United Airlines	Chicago–O'Hare, Denver, Houston–Intercontinental, Newark, San Francisco (begins March 29, 2027), Washington–Dulles
United Express	Houston–Intercontinental; Seasonal: Chicago–O'Hare, Newark, Washington–Dulles

=== Cargo ===
Airlines	Destinations
FedEx Express	Memphis, Indianapolis
UPS Airlines	Louisville, San Juan, Philadelphia

== Statistics ==
=== Passenger traffic ===
The 2024 fiscal year (10/1/2023-9/30/2024) set a record for passenger numbers at Jacksonville International Airport. handling 7,647,916 passengers, which was a 4.7% increase from the prior fiscal year.

=== Annual traffic ===
JAX Annual Passenger Traffic 2017/2018 Fiscal Year (10/1-9/30) to Present
Fiscal Year	Passengers
2017/2018	6,221,827
2018/2019	7,073,228
2019/2020	3,960,498
2020/2021	4,162,825
2021/2022	6,387,924
2022/2023	7,306,171
2023/2024	7,647,916
2024/2025	7,573,168

=== Top destinations ===
Busiest domestic routes from JAX (January 2025 - December 2025)
Rank	City	Passengers	Carriers
1	Atlanta, Georgia	649,620	Delta, Frontier
2	Charlotte, North Carolina	297,610	American
3	Dallas/Fort Worth, Texas	252,280	American
4	New York–JFK, New York	182,230	Delta, JetBlue
5	Chicago–O'Hare, Illinois	172,930	American, United
6	Baltimore, Maryland	161,070	Southwest
7	Philadelphia, Pennsylvania	159,170	American, Frontier
8	Newark, New Jersey	152,740	United
9	Miami, Florida	149,130	American
10	Boston, Massachusetts	135,840	Delta, JetBlue

=== Airline market share ===
Largest airlines at JAX (January 2025 - December 2025)
Rank	Airline	Passengers	Share
1	American Airlines	1,794,000	24.35%
2	Delta Air Lines	1,565,000	21.25%
3	Southwest Airlines	1,129,000	15.33%
4	United Airlines	881,000	11.97%
5	JetBlue Airways	392,000	5.32%
	Other	1,604,000	21.78%

== Ground transportation ==
Jacksonville International Airport has direct public transit service to Jacksonville Transportation Authority's bus network. The Route 1 bus connects the airport to downtown Jacksonville, with connections to Greyhound Bus Lines and to the Jacksonville Skyway monorail system.

== Accidents and incidents ==
- On October 4, 1971, George M. Giffe Jr. hijacked a plane in Nashville, Tennessee, then forced the pilot to fly to Jacksonville, where Giffe killed his wife, the pilot, and himself when cornered by the FBI.
- On February 23, 1978, a Naval Reserve P-3A Orion, BuNo 151381 of Patrol Squadron SIXTY-TWO VP-62) based at NAS Jacksonville, experienced a gear-up landing at Jacksonville IAP. The resulting impact and post-landing fire destroyed the aircraft, but all five crew members escaped safely without injury. Although a VP-62 aircraft, the mishap crew were all members of VP-0516, a separate Naval Reserve squadron augmentation unit (SAU) at NAS Jacksonville.
- On December 6, 1984, Provincetown-Boston Airlines Flight 1039 crashed on takeoff, killing 11 passengers and 2 crew on board. The debris from the Tampa-bound flight burned near Lem Turner Road. The 1986 National Transportation Safety Board report cited an elevator trim control system failure, which caused separation of the horizontal stabilizer.
- On June 7, 1988, a Florida Air National Guard (FLANG) F-16A Fighting Falcon was landing at Jacksonville IAP when two wild pigs ran across the runway in front of the aircraft during rollout. The pigs severed the left main landing gear and the pilot safely ejected. The aircraft ran off the end of the runway and stopped but did not catch fire or explode, and was removed by crane and relocated to the FLANG's hangar at the airport. The mishap caused $487,000 in damage and 900 parts were replaced including all landing gear, speed brakes, horizontal stabilizers, the nose, canopy and most of the cockpit instrumentation. The jet flew again for the first time on May 14, 1989 with the original mishap pilot, Lt Col Sam Carter, at the controls.
- On December 21, 2001, a Piper PA-32 Cherokee Six crashed while making a missed approach at the Jacksonville International Airport. The crash was attributed to spatial disorientation.
- On December 14, 2002, a Beech 200 King Air landed with collapsed landing gear after the gear failed to retract after departure. The probable cause of the incident was found to be a failure of the main landing gear locking mechanism for undetermined reasons, which resulted in the main landing gear collapsing, and damage to the airplane during landing.
- On October 28, 2004, a Scottish Aviation Bulldog model 120 collided with trees then experienced collapse of the right main landing gear during an emergency landing at the Jacksonville International Airport. The probable cause of the accident was found to be the pilot's failure to maintain altitude/clearance with trees.

=== 2025 parking garage fire ===
On May 16, 2025, the hourly parking garage structure suffered damage after a vehicle caught fire. The fire quickly spread across a portion of the 3rd level, affecting around 50 vehicles and causing a partial collapse of the second and third levels. The garage will remain closed indefinitely until its structural integrity can be examined.

As of June 2025, the origin of the fire was linked to a single BMW, though it is still unclear how the fire spread so significantly. The airport is expected to spend $38 million to fix the garage; while insurance proceeds are expected to play a large role, it is not completely clear how the full cost of the fix will be covered.

The airport says it may use the opportunity to add an additional floor to the parking garage as well as a sprinkler system to help suppress future fires.

In 2024, construction began on a parking garage containing 2,000 spaces that is expected to open in November 2026. This new garage is situated nearby the hourly parking garage that was involved in the 2025 fire, as well as the existing daily parking garage. Repairs on the fire-damaged parking garage are expected to be completed in summer 2027 and return more than 300 parking spaces into service.

== See also ==
- Transportation in Jacksonville, Florida
- List of the busiest airports in the United States
