= Camp Blanding =

National Guard base in Florida, US

Camp Blanding Joint Training Center
- Clay County, near Starke, Florida
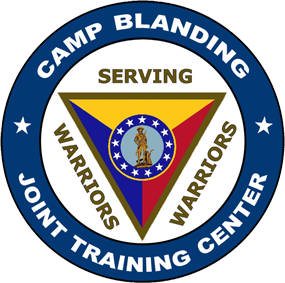

Site information
- Type: Military Reservation
- Controlled by: Florida National Guard

Location
- Coordinates: 29.9519°N 81.9799°W

Site history
- Built: 1940
- In use: 1940–present

Garrison information
- Garrison: 53rd Infantry Brigade; 3rd Battalion, 20th Special Forces

Camp Blanding Joint Training Center is the primary military reservation and training base for the Florida National Guard, both the Florida Army National Guard and certain nonflying activities of the Florida Air National Guard. The installation is located in Clay County, Florida, near the city of Starke in adjacent Bradford County. However, while Camp Blanding utilizes a Starke address, it is located totally within the confines of Clay County. The site measures about 73,000 acres (30,000 ha) and includes Kingsley Lake. It also hosts other Reserve, Army National Guard, Air National Guard, and some Active Component training for the U.S. Armed Forces.

Additionally, Camp Blanding serves as a training center for many ROTC units, Army, Navy and Air Force. Jacksonville University and University of South Florida NROTC Battalions continue to conduct their week-long orientation at Camp Blanding each August before the college semester starts. Camp Blanding also hosts the Audie Murphy Field Training Exercise where Army ROTC units from more than a dozen Florida, Georgia, and Puerto Rican universities gather to conduct a five-day field problem focusing on small-unit tactics, land navigation, and leadership development every April. It also serves as the site for the Florida Wing Summer and Winter Encampment for the Civil Air Patrol/US Air Force Auxiliary's Cadet Program each year.

Camp Blanding is the primary training site for most of the Florida National Guard's military units and the main combat arms brigade, the 53rd Infantry Brigade of the Florida Army National Guard. It is also home to the headquarters and support companies of the 3-20th Special Forces Group, the 211th Infantry Regiment, and the 2-111th Airfield Operations Battalion of the 111th Aviation Regiment.

Camp Blanding also houses several non-flying units of the Florida Air National Guard, including the 125th Regional Support Group, 202nd RED HORSE Squadron, 159th Weather Flight, 131st Training Flight, and the joint Army/Air Force 44th Civil Support Team. The base is also a training location for several counter-drug units and law enforcement agencies in Florida and functions as the alternate Emergency Operations Center (EOC) for Florida.

In 2008, Camp Blanding became host to the Army's latest air assault course in response to the growing need for air assault-trained individuals for the continuing operations in Iraq and Afghanistan. Also, a bombing and strafing target for military aircraft, primarily used by the Navy, Marine Corps, and Air Force, is located on the southern portion of the post.

Camp Blanding is home to the Multijurisdictional Counterdrug Task Force Training, which provides unique, tuition-free military and counterdrug training for local, state, federal, and military criminal justice professionals, as well as awareness training for community leaders.

Camp Blanding is also home to the Combating Transnational Organized Crime Center of Excellence, which provides unique, tuition-free training in support of Department of Defense strategies, and has campuses on Camp Blanding, at St. Petersburg College in St. Petersburg, Florida, and on Camp Murray near Tacoma, Washington.

Camp Blanding is also home to the annual FBI National Academy Associates Youth Leadership Academy (YLA). The YLA takes place during the summer and involves a rigorous selection process of 14-16 year olds throughout Florida. YLA exposes students to top-tier law enforcement professionals from across Florida.

Camp Blanding also hosts the Florida State Guard for Initial Entry Training, Quarterly Drills, and Annual Training.

== History ==
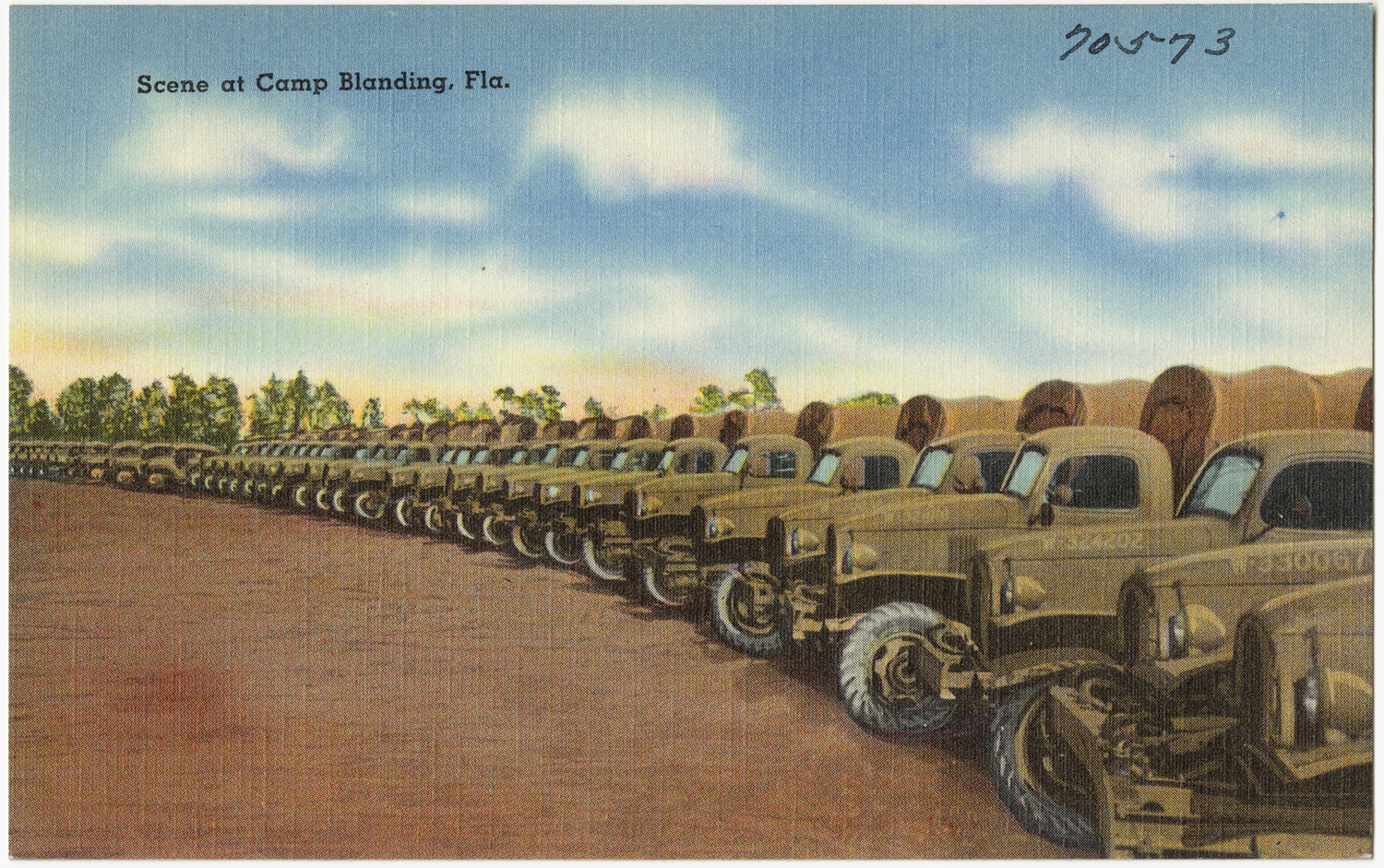
Army trucks lined up at Blanding, likely after 1940

Camp Blanding was established in 1939 on 30,000 acres (12,000 ha) as a training facility for the Florida National Guard after its previous training base, Camp Foster, on the St. Johns River near Jacksonville had been taken over by the Navy for Naval Air Station Jacksonville. The new camp was named for Albert H. Blanding, who had been commissioned in the Florida National Guard in 1899, and was then a major general and the Chief of the National Guard Bureau. In 1940, as the threat of war increased and the United States Army was built up, Camp Blanding became a federal facility housing two infantry divisions plus auxiliary units. Between 1940 and 1943, nine US Army infantry divisions trained at Camp Blanding, including the 1st Infantry Division, 29th Infantry Division, 30th Infantry Division, 31st Infantry Division, 36th Infantry Division, 43rd Infantry Division, 63rd Infantry Division, 66th Infantry Division, and 79th Infantry Division. Additionally, the 508th Parachute Infantry Regiment was stood up at Camp Blanding in October 1942. In 1943, Camp Blanding became an infantry replacement training center, training soldiers to be sent to existing infantry divisions as individual replacements, providing a high percentage of the replacements sent to Army combat units. Japanese-American volunteers who were destined for service as infantry replacements with the 442nd Regimental Combat Team were also trained at Camp Blanding. During WWII, more than 800,000 soldiers trained at Camp Blanding.

The base was a holding center for 343 Japanese, German, and Italian immigrant residents of the United States who were interned as potential security risks by the federal government. Additionally, between 1942 and 1946, Camp Blanding hosted a prisoner of war camp which at its peak held 1,200 Germans. It was broken down into fifteen separate smaller camps hosting between 250 and 300 prisoners each. A small cemetery is located on the grounds of the former POW camp, which formerly contained the bodies of six German prisoners who died while held at Camp Blanding between July 1944 and October 1945. In April 1946, the remains were removed to Fort Benning, Georgia as part of a post-war consolidation along with remains from several other small POW cemeteries in the Southeast. Thereafter, the cemetery was closed, however, the original grave markers remain. Additionally five settler-era cemeteries are located on Camp Blanding property. None are maintained, and are heavily overgrown. One, Oak Grove Cemetery, is currently inaccessible due to being located inside the buffer area for the Camp Blanding Impact Range, but was an active cemetery from 1829 to 1968, well after the establishment of the impact area.

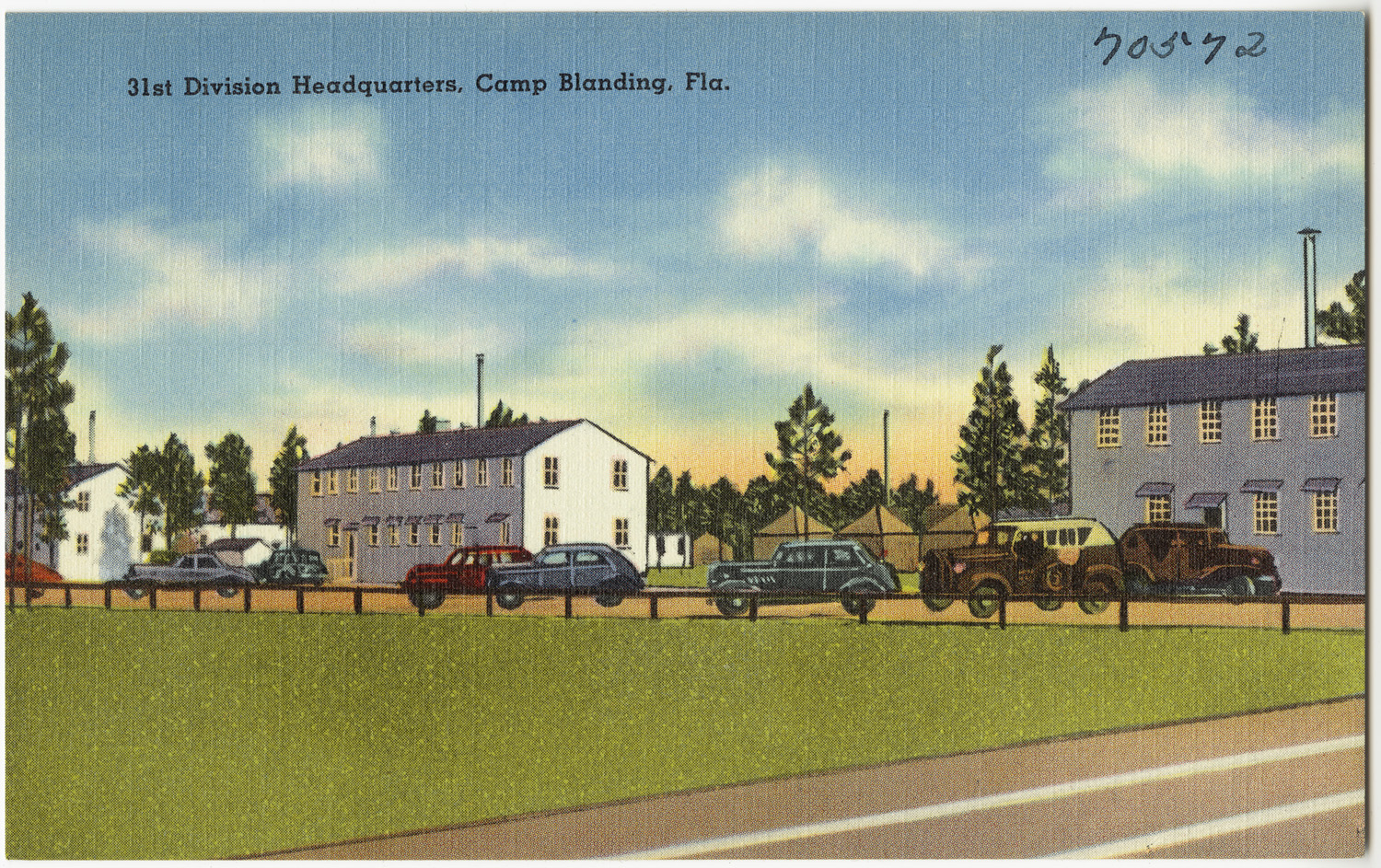
31st division headquarters at Camp Blanding, likely after 1940

At one point during the war, the camp contained the population of the fourth-largest city in Florida. It had 10,000 buildings, 125 miles (201 km) of paved roads, and the largest hospital in the state. It was one of the largest training bases in the country. There were several newspapers published at the camp during the war, which helped provide insights into daily life at the camp, such as The Bulletin, the Bayonet, and the Camp Blanding Report. After the war, Camp Blanding was the headquarters of the Military District of Florida and was commanded by Brigadier General Charles S. Kilburn.

An expeditionary airfield consisting of two gravel runways capable of accommodating C-130 Hercules aircraft was added in the 1970s along with the reactivation of the artillery training range and parachute drop zones.

From 2001 until 2008, Camp Blanding was used by the Southeast Region of the Civil Air Patrol to host their Southeast Region Encampment for cadets. The Florida Wing of Civil Air Patrol continues to use Camp Blanding for their wing-level cadet encampments.

== Camp Blanding Museum and Memorial Park ==
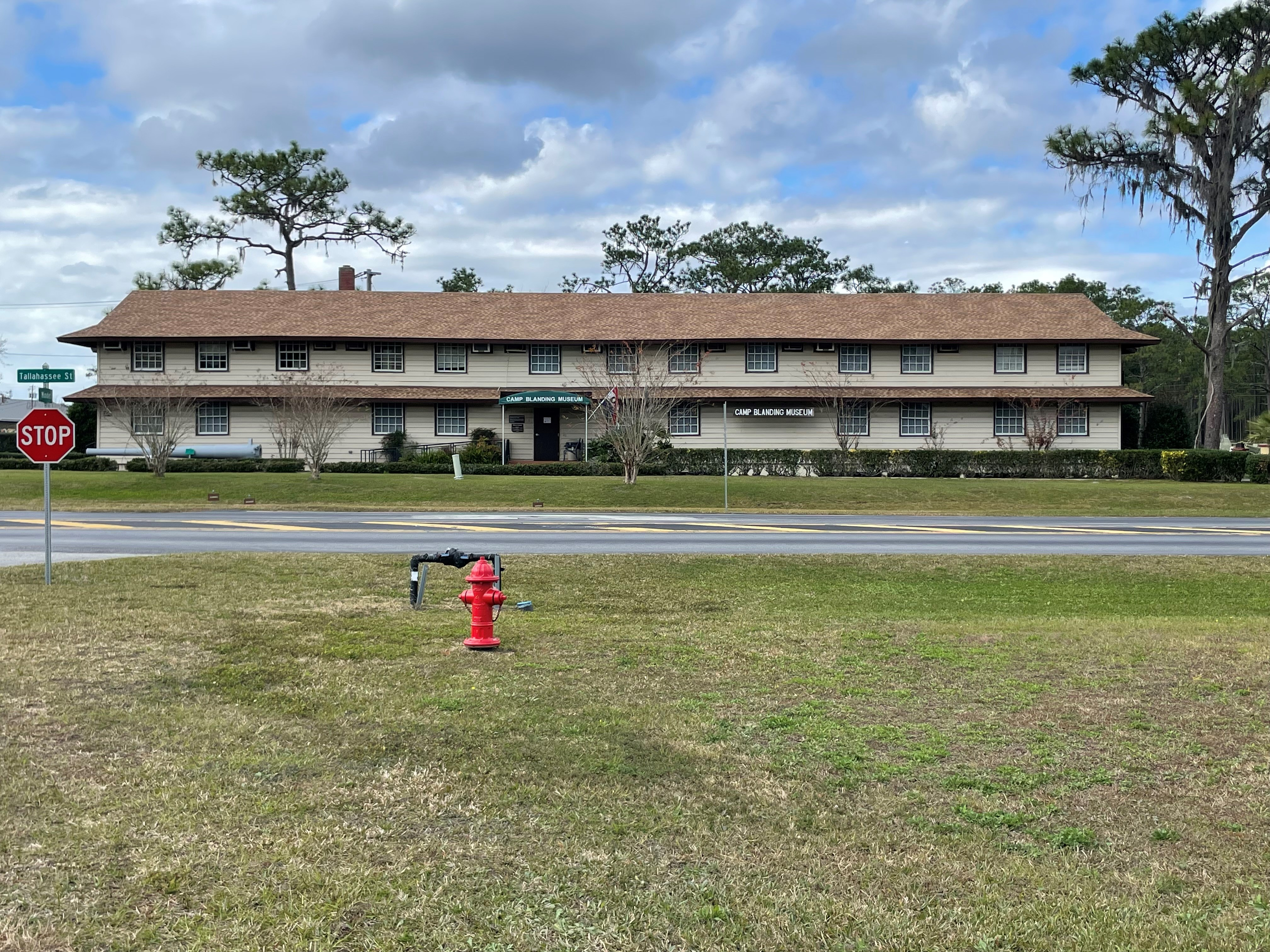
The Camp Blanding Museum is located outside the main entrance of the facility.

Established in 1990 the Camp Blanding museum and Memorial Park is located immediately outside the main entrance to the installation and is open the public. It is broken down into two major sections, the museum which is located inside a restored WWII building, and the outdoor memorial park. The museum is free of charge to enter and contains displays and artifacts from Florida's military history from World War I to the present day. The outdoor memorial park is self-guided and contains vehicles and aircraft from WWII to the present day along with memorials to all the units which trained at Camp Blanding during WWII, members of the Florida National Guard who died in service, and several cenotaphs for persons who played significant roles in the history of Camp Blanding and the units associated with the installation. There is also an airpark with several fixed and rotary wing aircraft on display and "Firebase Florida" is recreation of a Vietnam-era artillery firebase. In addition to the American military machinery on display there are several armored vehicles captured during the 1991 Gulf War and Operation Iraqi Freedom, both of which the Florida National Guard was deployed for.

Type	S/N	Service	Note
Grumman A-6A Intruder	155661	1969 - 1994	Participated in the 1972 Easter Offensive during the Vietnam conflict.
Vought A-7E Corsair II	157586	Unknown	Displayed as 157503 which was shot down over Vietnam in December 1972.
Douglas C-47A Skytrain	42-23757	1942 - 1966	Painted as 42-100597; Delivered to the Navy as BuNo 12346. Diplomatic service in Australia with USN. Formerly on display at Ft. Rucker from 1966 until 1990 when moved to current location.
Boeing CH-47C Chinook	87-0075	1987 - 2010	
Convair F-106A Delta Dart	59-0105	1959 - 1998	Converted to QF-106 in 1993. Retired in 1998 with cracked wing spar. Painted in the colors of the Florida Air National Guard's 125th Fighter Wing.
Bell UH-1H Iroquois	66-16056	1966 - 19??	Displayed as in MEDEVAC colors.
Bell UH-1H Iroquois	68-16114	1968 - 1981	Served in Vietnam at Binh Thuy.
Bell OH-58A Kiowa	72-21445	1972 - 1989	
