= Fairchild C-26 Metroliner =

Military transport aircraft

C-26 "Metroliner"
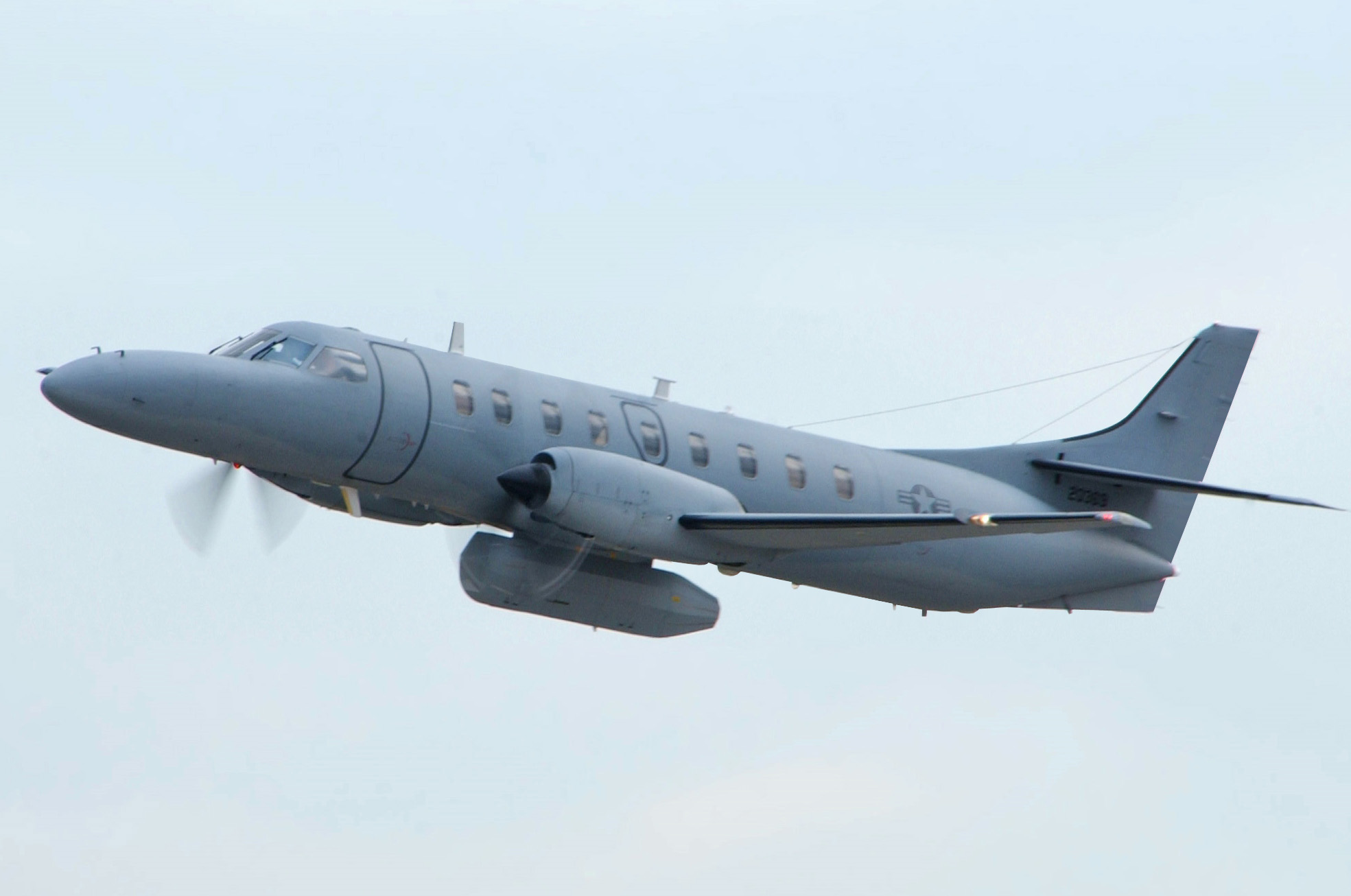
- RC-26B aircraft of the Florida Air National Guard

General information
- Type: Military transport aircraft
- Manufacturer: Fairchild Aircraft
- Status: Active, not in production
- Primary users: United States Air Force United States Army; United States Navy

History
- Developed from: Fairchild Swearingen Metroliner

The Fairchild C-26 "Metroliner" is the Fairchild Swearingen Metroliner series twin turboprop aircraft in the service of the United States military. It was not officially named by the US Armed Forces, but is unofficially known by the same name as its civilian counterpart. The C-26A is the military version of the Model SA227-AC Metro III; the C-26B is the military version of the Model SA227-BC Metro III and Model SA227-DC Metro 23; and UC-26C is the military designation for the Model SA227-AT Merlin IVC. The C-26D provides rapid-response transportation for supplies and personnel to remote airfields.

== Design and development ==
The United States Air Force bought eleven C-26A aircraft based on the SA227-AC, two of these being supplied to the Venezuelan Air Force. The first three C-26Bs were procured later in the 1980s, two for the US Army and one for the USAF. These three had been built as SA227-BC models. Later C-26Bs were the military equivalent of the Metro 23 and the USAF took delivery of 37 examples. Some of these were transferred to the Peruvian Air Force and the US Army, while six were transferred to the US Navy as C-26Ds. The US Army also took a second-hand Merlin IVC and operated it as the solitary UC-26C.

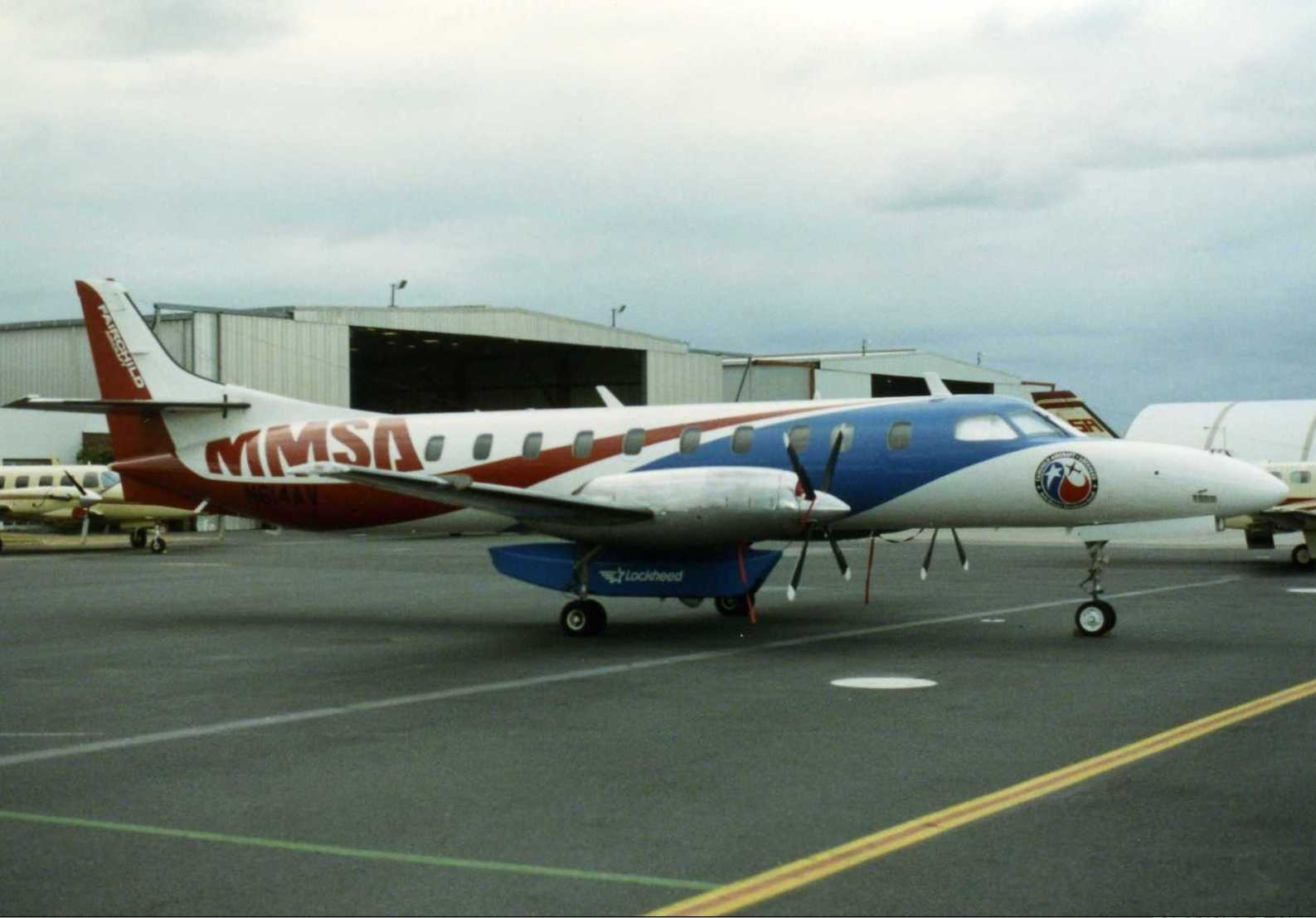
The Multi Mission Surveillance Aircraft in Australia, early 1990s

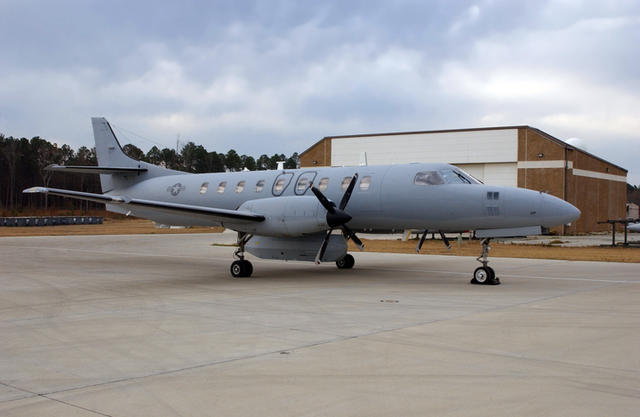
An RC-26B sits at Jacksonville ANG Base in February 2005.

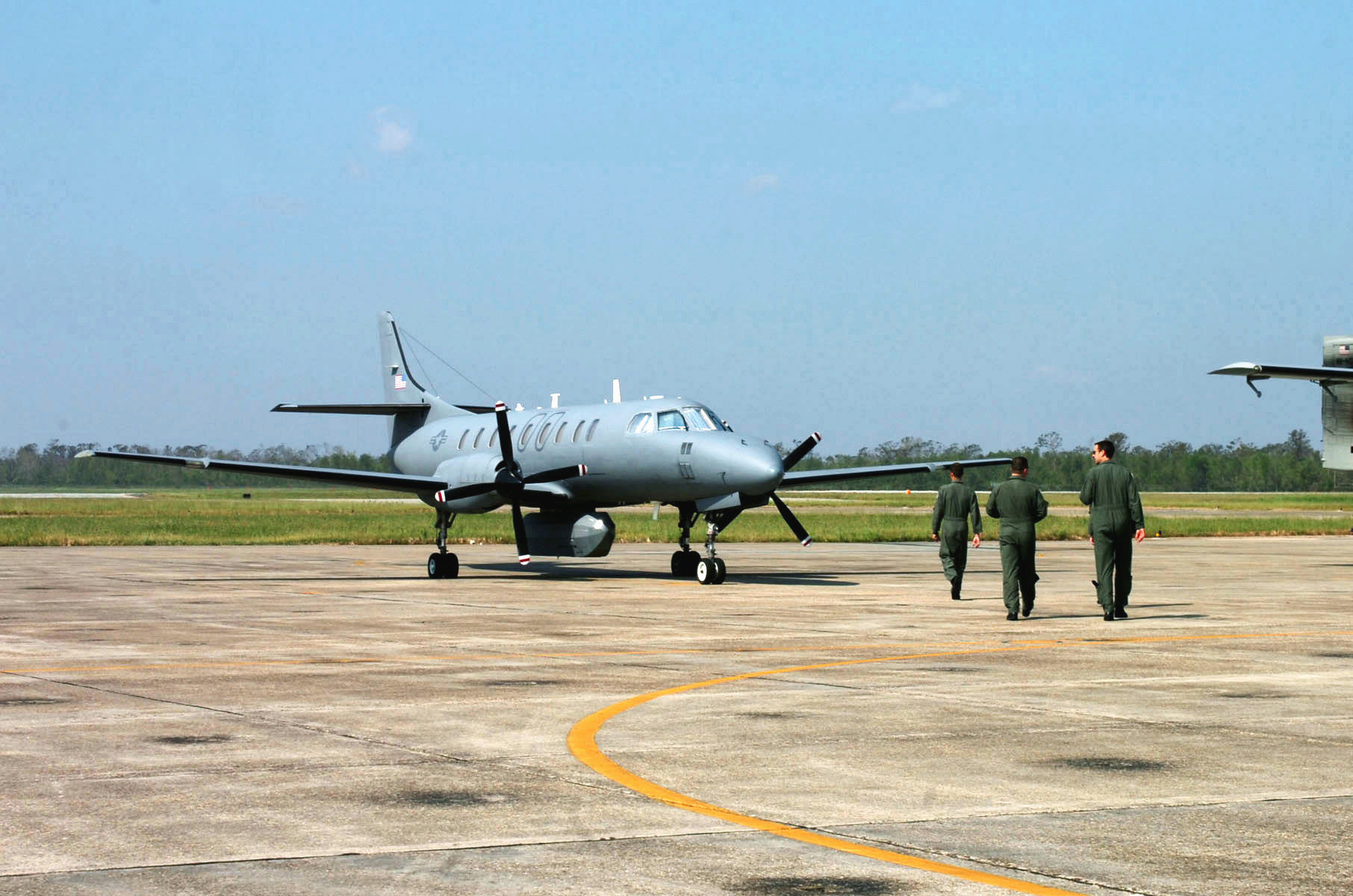
A Texas ANG RC-26B provided photographs of flood damage from Hurricane Katrina in New Orleans, Louisiana in September 2005

A Metro III, c/n AC-614, was modified as the Fairchild Aircraft/Lockheed Multi Mission Surveillance Aircraft, featuring a Lockheed phased array radar in a long pod under the fuselage. Several aspects of the MMSA aircraft were incorporated on some USAF C-26s redesignated as the RC-26B, operated by the Air National Guard (ANG) in various states. These aircraft have been primarily used for Department of Defense reconnaissance mission support to various agencies of the Department of Homeland Security such as the United States Coast Guard (USCG) and Customs and Border Protection (CBP) in the war on drugs, and to USCG and/or the Federal Emergency Management Agency (FEMA) in the wake of natural disasters. The RC-26B aircraft were originally configured with a belly pod containing a sensor turret and a data recorder. Recently, this pod has been removed and a sensor turret has been added to the belly of the aircraft. Some of the RC-26Bs were operated for a time with civil registrations. On 4 February 2019, a contract for Elbit Systems of America to provide an avionics upgrade to the Air National Guard's RC-26Bs was announced.

The U.S. Navy operates several C-26D aircraft, modified for range support, at the Pacific Missile Range Facility at Barking Sands in Hawaii. The C-26A has also been used as a trainer for U.S. Navy test pilots.

== Operational history ==
In early June 2020, the US National Guard deployed an RC-26B to El Dorado Hills near Sacramento, California, apparently in response to a walking tour by young black entrepreneurs. The deployment occurred without the knowledge or approval of Gavin Newsom, the Governor of California. Three more RC-26Bs were used to observe demonstrators in Minneapolis, Phoenix and Washington, D.C.

In January 2023, the U.S. Air Force retired its RC-26B Condors.

== Variants ==
C-26A
Military version of the Metro III (Model SA227-AC).
C-26B
Military version of the Metro III (Model SA227-BC) and Metro 23 (Model SA227-DC).
RC-26B
C-26B modified with electronic surveillance equipment for drug interdiction missions. Ten remained in service with the Air National Guard as of March 2019, but all were retired during 2023.
UC-26C
Was a used 1983-built Merlin IVC operated for several years as 89-1471. Modified with an integrated sensor package including forward-looking infrared and high resolution radar.
C-26D
C-26Bs transferred from USAF inventory and modified with new navigation equipment for the US Navy, four used for rapid response cargo and passenger transportation in Europe.
EC-26D
One range support aircraft operated by the US Navy's Pacific Missile Range Facility at Barking Sands.
RC-26D
Two range support aircraft operated by the US Navy's Pacific Missile Range Facility at Barking Sands with installed radar units.
C-26E
Upgrade of 11 C-26B aircraft including an improved Rockwell Collins Proline 21 Electronic Flight Instrument System.

== Operators ==
Barbados

- Barbados Air Wing – Regional Security System 2 C-26A

Colombia

- Colombian Air Force
- Colombian National Police

Mexico

- Mexican Air Force - 2 as of December 2018.

Peru

- Peruvian Air Force - 3 as of December 2018.

Trinidad and Tobago

- Trinidad and Tobago Air Guard - 2 as of December 2018.

United States

- United States Army 11 SA-227 Metro (C-26E) as of January 2025
- United States Navy

Venezuela

- Venezuelan Air Force - 1 as of December 2018.

=== Former ===
United States

- United States Air Force
  - 745th Special Operations Squadron

== Specifications (C-26A) ==
General characteristics

- Crew: two
- Capacity: 22/14 passengers
- Length: 59 ft 4 in (12.85 m)
- Wingspan: 57 ft 0 in (14.01 m)
- Height: 16 ft 10 in (5.13 m)
- Max takeoff weight: 14,000 lb (6,400 kg)
- Fuel capacity: 625 gal (2,370 L)
- Powerplant: 2 × Allied Signal Garrett TPE-331-11U-601G turboprops, 1,400 hp (1,000 kW) each

Performance

- Maximum speed: 331 mph (533 km/h, 288 kn)
- Range: 2,331 mi (3,750 km, 2,025 nmi)
- Service ceiling: 31,000 ft (9,500 m)
- Power/mass: 0.2 hp/lb (337.5 W/kg)

== See also ==
Related development

- Swearingen Merlin
- Fairchild Swearingen Metroliner

Aircraft of comparable role, configuration, and era

- Beechcraft 1900
- C-12 Huron
- Saab 340
- Saab 2000

Related lists

- List of military aircraft of the United States
