= List of United States Air Force civil engineering squadrons =

The United States Air Force maintains a number of civil engineering units in the form of United States Air Force civil engineering squadrons. In wartime, they provide for the rapid repair of damage to airfields and other critical facilities. In peacetime, they maintain and construct bases for the air force to operate out of.

Some of these units are organized as Rapid Engineer Deployable Heavy Operational Repair Squadron Engineers (RED HORSE) and others as Prime Base Engineer Emergency Force (PRIME BEEF) units.

== List ==
Prime BEEF Squadrons
Squadron	Shield	Location	Note
577th Expeditionary Prime BEEF Squadron			
777th Expeditionary Prime BEEF Squadron			
877th Expeditionary Prime BEEF Squadron			
RED HORSE Units
Squadron	Shield	Location	Note
1st Expeditionary RED HORSE Group		Al Udeid AB, Qatar	
200th RED HORSE Squadron		Camp Perry, OH	
201st RED HORSE Squadron		Fort Indiantown Gap, PA	
202d RED HORSE Squadron		Camp Blanding, FL	
203d RED HORSE Squadron		Camp Pendleton, VA	
219th RED HORSE Squadron		Malmstrom AFB, MT	
254th RED HORSE Squadron		Andersen AFB, GU	
307th RED HORSE Squadron		Barksdale AFB, LA	
554th RED HORSE Squadron		Andersen AFB, GU	Reserve
555th RED HORSE Squadron		Nellis AFB, NV	Reserve
556th RED HORSE Squadron		Hurlburt Field, FL	Reserve
560th RED HORSE Squadron		JB Charleston, SC	Reserve
567th RED HORSE Squadron		Seymour-Johnson AFB, NC	Reserve
583rd RED HORSE Squadron		Seymour-Johnson AFB, NC	Reserve
819th RED HORSE squadron		Malmstrom AFB, MT	
820th RED HORSE Squadron		Nellis AFB, NV	
823d RED HORSE Squadron		Hurlburt Field, FL	

== See also ==
- List of United States Air Force squadrons
