= Military engineering of the United States =

The United States first formed a military engineering capability on 16 June 1775, when the Continental Congress established an army with a chief engineer and two assistants. Subsequently, on 16 March 1802, the Corps of Engineers was organized by the President. Today, Military Engineers are grouped separately within each of the armed services.

== History ==
=== The Revolutionary War and origins ===
The prevalence of military engineering in the United States dates back to the American Revolutionary War when engineers would carry out tasks in the U.S. Army. During the war, they would map terrain and build fortifications to protect troops from opposing forces. Examples of military engineering from this period in American history are the fortifications of Saratoga, New York. The knowledge and skills of the military engineers contributed to the success and independence of the American colonies.

=== Nineteenth century and the Civil War ===
The United States Army Corps of Engineers existed sporadically for two decades after its founding. The Army Corps of Engineers would not be revived until European powers posed the threat of war. In 1802, President Thomas Jefferson and Congress reestablished the Corps of Engineers as the Corps at West Point, New York, which served as a military academy devoted to training military engineers. The Corps of Engineers ran the United States Military Academy until 1866 and served as the first American college with an engineering-based curriculum.

Throughout the early 19th century, military engineers in the Army Corps built brick and masonry seacoast fortifications. After 1824, two Army Corps of Engineers existed in the United States. One of them was responsible for building fortifications while the other was responsible for improving the country’s harbors and rivers. The two corps occasionally overlapped, especially during times of war. The two corps united as one and expanded in 1863 in the midst of the American Civil War. With the advancement of warfare technology, the Army Corps of Engineers had to expand their knowledge of building bridges and facilities capable of handling heavier artillery.

=== Twentieth and twenty-first century ===
During World War I and World War II, military engineers built roads, bridges, railroads, ports, fortifications, trenches, and depots in battlefield situations. These engineers emerged as important factors in warfare both on the front lines and behind those lines. Speed became a significant factor in these times of war because of the advancements in equipment and artillery on both ally and enemy lines. The task of building infrastructure in a timely manner became more important as new warfare strategies emerged and mobility became a more dangerous task to maintain. One well-noted example of military engineering during World War II was the construction of a supply road from Ledo, India to the Burma Road in 1944 by Allied forces at a point where the road was still in Chinese territory. This road, opened in 1945, was 478 miles long, and twisted through mountains, swamps, wetlands, and jungles. Some of the most famous projects in American military engineering history were the various facilities used to house the Manhattan Project in the construction of America’s first atomic bombs. Innovative equipment, including armored engineering vehicles that had to be capable of navigating ashore from landing craft, was developed for the allied forces’ amphibious operations. These types of new inventions aided troops in an intricate, complex war fought on land, by sea, and by air.

The Korean and Vietnam Wars brought about new technology for engineers to adapt to. Guerilla warfare on opposing sides in addition to unfamiliar territories and diverse, treacherous topography of foreign land required more mapping and logistic skills than before. Hundreds of miles of roads were laid and landing pads for the newly developed military helicopters were cleared from acres of jungle. While their skills improved, efforts proved to be unsuccessful in comparison to World War I and World War II.

After the United States Air Force separated from the Army in 1947, military engineers found much success in the Cold War against the Soviet Union. From 1947 to 1991, the Cold War increased competition and political tension between nations that had been in opposition in previous wars, including the United States. Little physical combat took place between opposing countries during this time of political hostility. The United States was constantly on the brink of potential warfare. With this potential threat came the need for military engineers to prepare for what was thought to be the beginning of war. Engineers constructed airfields for heavy bombers, launch facilities for intercontinental ballistic missiles, and radar installations to increase communication. They built many of the facilities for the National Aeronautics and Space Administration (NASA). After the Cold War, military engineering found its place on the front lines again. The Persian Gulf War and wars thereafter brought about new tactics and advancements that required massive logistical support. Military engineers also had a helping hand in the design and construction of military command centers such as the Cheyenne Mountain complex in Colorado Springs, Colorado, which houses the North American Aerospace Defense Command (NORAD).

== Shortage of military engineers in the 21st century ==
The 21st century brought about a problem that existed in the early history of United States military engineering. Careers in military engineering require four-year bachelor's degrees in specific engineering fields such as civil, mechanical, and electrical along with degrees in mathematical sciences and natural sciences. A shortage in the number of students graduating in these fields of science, technology, engineering, and mathematics, also known as STEM majors, is causing a shortage in military engineers in the United States.

According to Department of Defense STEM officials, social networking, poor credit history, and a lack of interest in engineering contribute to the shortage. Social networking and media release information about potential employees that is accessible world-wide. United States government careers and positions require a significant level of private information to be kept out of public knowledge. Companies and employers, including the United States Department of Defense, use Facebook and other social networking sites to decide employment potential. The Department of Defense believes this jeopardizes the process of employing military engineers.

A poor credit history can affect employment potential for possible military engineers. Credit history can be used as a reference for reliability in workplace environments. According to the Department of Defense, the population of those with poor credit in the early 21st century scores is large, with student debt being a contributing factor.

Department of Defense careers require employees to be United States citizens. Outsourcing military engineering careers to countries with a large number engineering graduates is not an option. According to the Department of Defense, nearly half of engineering graduates in the United States are foreign born, resulting in ineligibility.

== Notable military engineering programs ==
In a 2012 report by US News, the nation’s three major military academies’ undergraduate engineering programs ranked in the top five. Engineering majors make up 21 percent of the United States Military Academy graduating class.

Notable military engineering programs include:

- United States Military Academy (West Point) ranked #3
- United States Air Force Academy ranked #4 (tie)
- United States Naval Academy ranked #4 (tie)

== Notable military engineering organizations ==
The oldest military engineering organization in the United States is the Army Corps of Engineers, founded during the American Revolutionary War. Other organizations formed as the need for engineering presence of each expanded branch of military increased.

Notable military engineering organizations include:

- Army Corps of Engineers
- Society of American Military Engineers
- United States Marine Corps Combat Engineers
- United States Navy Civil Engineer Corps (CEC)
- United States Naval Construction Force (Seabees)
- Naval Facilities Engineering Command (NAVFAC)
- Air Force Civil Engineer Support Agency
- Rapid Engineer Deployable Heavy Operational Repair Squadron Engineers (RED HORSE)
- Redeployment Assistance Inspection Detachments (RAID)
- Prime Base Engineer Emergency Force (Prime BEEF)

== Notable projects ==
Since the founding of the Army Corps of Engineers, they have been responsible for domestic civil engineering and civil works projects as in addition to military and defense projects. A large-scale project includes the construction, maintenance, and operation of the Atlantic Intracoastal Waterway on the east and gulf coasts of the United States. The Intracoastal Waterway is an inland navigational waterway excavated in the early Twentieth century that runs over 3,000 miles from Norfolk, Virginia to the Florida Keys and from the Florida Keys to Brownsville, Texas. The waterway has been a source of transportation, commerce, and leisure since its completion.

Another large-scale project carried out by the Army Corps of Engineers is the construction of Hartwell Lake on the border of Georgia and South Carolina. Hartwell Lake was built between 1955 and 1963. The main purposes that the lake serves are flood risk management, water quality, water supply, hydropower production, wildlife protection, and recreation.

The Army Corps of Engineers’ military engineers are responsible for the construction and maintenance of the southern Louisiana levee system. Much of southern Louisiana lies below sea level making the area prone to flooding and land erosion. The levee system serves as a collection of dams along the banks of the Mississippi River that prevent land from flooding.

== United States Army ==
Military engineers in the United States Army belong to the United States Army Corps of Engineers. The motto of the US Army Corps of Engineers is "ESSAYONS", from French "Let us try". Army engineers include both combat engineers and support engineers more focused on construction and sustainment. U.S. Army Engineer units outside of USACE Districts fall under the Engineer Regiment of the U.S. Army Corps of Engineers. The vast majority of military personnel in the United States Army Corps of Engineers serve in this Engineer Regiment. The Engineer Regiment is headquartered at Fort Leonard Wood, Missouri and commanded by the Engineer Commandant, currently a position filled by an Army Brigadier General from the Engineer Branch. As of 2013, Army Corps of Engineers Military Occupation Specialties (MOS) were:

Enlisted

- 12B Combat Engineer
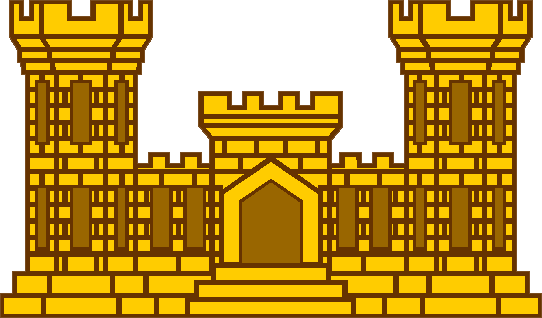
  Insignia of the United States Army Corps of Engineers
- 12C Bridge Crewmember
- 12D Diver
- 12G Quarrying Specialist
- 12H Construction Engineering Supervisor
- 12K Plumber
- 12M Firefighter
- 12N Horizontal Construction Engineer
- 12P Prime Power Production Specialist
- 12Q Power Line Distribution Specialist (RC)
- 12R Interior Electrician
- 12T Technical Engineer
- 12V Concrete and Asphalt Equipment Operator
- 12W Carpentry and Masonry Specialist
- 12X General Engineering Supervisor
- 12Y Geospatial Engineer
- 12Z Combat Engineering Senior Sergeant
- 18C Special Forces Engineer Sergeant

Warrant Officer

- 120A Construction Engineer Technician
- 125D Geospatial Information Technician

Officer

- 12A Engineer Officer
- 12D Facilities/Contract Construction Management Engineer (FCCME)

== United States Air Force ==
Military engineering in the United States Air Force comes from the Air Force Civil Engineer Support Agency, RED HORSE and Prime BEEF. USAF military engineering occupations consist of:

Enlisted

- 3E - Civil Engineering
  - 3E0X1 - Electrical Systems
  - 3E0X2 - Electrical Power Production
  - 3E1X1 - Heating, Ventilation, AC, and Refrigeration
  - 3E2X1 - Pavements and Construction Equipment
  - 3E3X1 - Structural
  - 3E4X1 - Water and Fuel Systems Maintenance
  - 3E4X3 - Pest Management
  - 3E5X1 - Engineering
  - 3E6X1 - Operations Management
  - 3E7X1 - Fire Protection
  - 3E8X1 - Explosive Ordnance Disposal
  - 3E9X1 - Emergency Management

Officer

- 32EX - Civil Engineer

== United States Navy ==
The United States Navy receives military engineering from the Civil Engineer Corps and Seabees. USN military engineering occupations consist of:

Enlisted

- Builder
- Construction Electrician
- Construction Mechanic
- Engineering Aide
- Equipment Operator
- Steelworker
- Utilitiesman

Warrant Officer

- 753X Civil Engineer Corps Warrant Officer

Officer

- 510x Civil Engineer Corps Officer
- 653x Civil Engineer Corps Limited Duty Officer (LDO)

== United States Marine Corps ==
The United States Marine Corps has a requirement for combat engineers in the same way as the Army. Thus, the USMC has United States Marine Corps Combat Engineers. USMC military engineering occupations consist of:

Enlisted

- 1300 Basic Engineer, Construction, Facilities, & Equipment Marine – GYSGT-PVT
- 1316 Metal Worker – SSGT-PVT
- 1341 Engineer Equipment Mechanic – SSGT-PVT
- 1342 Small Craft Mechanic – SSGT-LCPL
- 1343 Assault Breacher Vehicle Mechanic – SSGT-LCPL
- 1345 Engineer Equipment Operator – SSGT-PVT
- 1349 Engineer Equipment Chief – MGYSGT-GYSGT
- 1361 Engineer Assistant – GYSGT-PVT
- 1371 Combat Engineer – MGYSGT-PVT
- 1372 Assault Breacher Vehicle Operator – MGYSGT-PFC
- 1391 Bulk Fuel Specialist – MGYSGT-PVT

Officer

- 1301 Basic Combat Engineer Officer
- 1302 Combat Engineer Officer
- 1310 Engineer Equipment Officer
- 1330 Facilities Management Officer
- 1390 Bulk Fuel Officer

Enlisted

- 1100 Basic Utilities Marine – GYSGT-PVT
- 1141 Electrician – SSGT-PVT
- 1142 Electrical Equipment Repair Specialist – SSGT-PVT
- 1161 Refrigeration Mechanic – SSGT-PVT
- 1169 Utilities Chief – MGYSGT-GYSGT
- 1171 Basic Water Support Technician – SSGT-PVT

Officer

- 1101 Basic Utilities Officer
- 1120 Utilities Officer

== United States Coast Guard ==
The Coast Guard is the only branch with an unofficial engineer job for enlisted. Although, the Coast Guard does have a Civil Engineering Command: Which consist of a six part regional Civil Engineering offices throughout the Coast Guard executing depot level maintenance projects. This is the most common assignment for a new Civil Engineering officer.

These offices include Civil Engineering Unit (CEU): Serve as part of the six regional Civil Engineering offices throughout the Coast Guard executing depot level maintenance projects. This is the most common assignment for a new Civil Engineering officer.

Facilities Engineering: An integral part of the management of facilities with a hands on role overseeing the day-to-day operation of the Bases, Training Centers, and Air Stations.

Shore Infrastructure Logistics Center (SILC): Positions at this command execute program priorities through creating procedures, and overseeing the CEUs.

Facilities Design and Construction Center (FDCC): Execute all new construction projects throughout the Coast Guard. FDCC is responsible for all phases of project execution including planning, design, contracting, and construction.

Coast Guard Headquarters: Serve in the Office of Civil Engineering directly influencing enterprise level policy, program, and organizational management initiatives.

Joint-Expeditionary Engineering: Redeployment Assistance Inspection Detachments (RAID), Redeployment Assistance Inspection Detachments or (RAID) consisted of Coast Guard members deployed with the U.S Army and Seabees to support of shipment of materials in and out of war zones. Their mission is to assist the Department of Defense with the safe re-deployment of containerized cargo as well as the storage and segregation of hazardous materials. The Coast Guard's was responsible to ensure that hazardous material was properly prepared and inspected for shipment and re-entry to U.S. ports. The team moved between Forward Operating Bases, making them amongst the few Coast Guardsmen to have been so far forward with the U.S. Army in a combat zone.

Enlisted Rates affiliated with Engineering Detachments:

- Damage Controlman
- Machinery Technician
- Diver
