= AFCEC =

AFCEC may refer to:

- Air Force Civil Engineer Center, a field operating agency of the US Air Force Civil Engineer
- Alberta Farmers' Co-operative Elevator Company, a cooperative that ran grain elevators between 1913 and 1917
