= List of United States Air Force Field Operating Agencies =

This is a list of Field Operating Agencies (FOA) in the United States Air Force that are active. FOAs report directly to a functional manager in either the Office of the Secretary of the Air Force or the Air Staff. FOAs perform field activities beyond the scope of any of the major commands. Their activities are specialized or associated with an Air Force wide mission.

== Current ==
Shield	FOA	Location
	Air Force Agency for Modeling and Simulation (AFAMS)	Orlando, Florida
	Air Force Audit Agency (AFAA)	The Pentagon, Washington, D.C.
	Cyberspace Capabilities Center (CCC)^	Scott Air Force Base, Illinois
	Air Force Cost Analysis Agency (AFCAA)	Arlington, Virginia
	Air Force Flight Standards Agency (AFFSA)	Oklahoma City, OK
	Air Force Spectrum Management Office (AFSMO)	Fort George G. Meade, Maryland
	Air Force Historical Research Agency (AFHRA)	Maxwell-Gunter Air Force Base, Alabama
	Air Force Inspection Agency (AFIA)	Kirtland Air Force Base, New Mexico
	Air Force Legal Operations Agency (AFLOA)	Joint Base Andrews, Maryland
	Air Force Logistics Management Agency (AFLMA)	Maxwell-Gunter Air Force Base, Alabama
	Air Force Manpower Analysis Agency (AFMAA)	JBSA-Randolph, Texas
	Air Force Medical Readiness Agency (AFMRA)	Falls Church, Virginia
	Air Force Mortuary Affairs Operations (AFMAO)	Dover Air Force Base, Delaware
	Air Force Office of Special Investigations (AFOSI)	Quantico, Virginia
	Air Force Personnel Center (AFPC)	JBSA-Randolph, San Antonio, Texas
	Air Force Personnel Operations Agency (AFPOA)	Washington, D.C.
	Air Reserve Personnel Center (ARPC)	Buckley Space Force Base, Colorado
	Air National Guard Readiness Center (ANGRC)	Joint Base Andrews, Maryland
	Air Force Public Affairs Agency (AFPAA)	JBSA-Randolph, Texas
	Air Force Review Boards Agency (AFRBA)	Joint Base Andrews, Maryland
	Air Force Safety Center (AFSEC)	Kirtland Air Force Base, New Mexico
	National Air Intelligence Center (NAIC)	Wright-Patterson Air Force Base, Ohio
	Department of Defense Cyber Crime Center (DC3)	Linthicum Heights, Maryland

^ CCC is designated a Field Operating Agency by Air Combat Command and reports to its A6 Directorate. It does not report to Air Force-level A Staff.

== Historic ==
Shield	FOA	Location
	Air Force Intelligence Analysis Agency (AFIAA)	Joint Base Anacostia-Bolling, Washington, D.C.
	Air Force Medical Operations Agency (AFMOA)	JBSA-Lackland, San Antonio, Texas
	Air Force Medical Support Agency (AFMSA)	Joint Base Anacostia-Bolling, Washington, D.C.
	Air Force National Security Emergency Preparedness Office (AFNSEPO)	Washington, D.C.
	Air Force Nuclear Weapons and Counterproliferation Agency (AFNWCA)	Kirtland Air Force Base, New Mexico
	Air Force Operations Group (AFOG)	Washington, D.C.
	Air Force Pentagon Communications Agency (AFPCA)	Washington, D.C.
	Air Force Program Executive Office (AFPEO)	Washington, D.C.
	Air Force Weather Agency (AFWA)	Offutt Air Force Base, Nebraska
	Air Force Civil Engineer Support Agency (AFCESA)	Tyndall Air Force Base, Florida
	Air Force Intelligence, Surveillance and Reconnaissance Agency (AFISRA)	JBSA-Lackland, Texas
	Air Force Center for Engineering and the Environment (AFCEE)	Port San Antonio, Texas
	Air Force Financial Services Center (AFFSC)	Ellsworth Air Force Base, South Dakota
	Global Cyberspace Integration Center (GCIC)	Joint Base Langley-Eustis, Virginia
	Air Force Real Property Agency (AFRPA)	JBSA-Lackland, Texas
	Air Force Petroleum Agency (AFPA)	Fort Belvoir, Virginia

== Sources ==
- Airman Magazine 2011 The Book pp. 17–19
