= 203 Squadron =

203 Squadron may refer to:

- No. 203 Squadron RAF, United Kingdom
- No. 203 Squadron RSAF, Saudi Arabia
- 203rd Tactical Fighter Squadron (JASDF), Japan
- 203 Squadron, Republic of Singapore Air Force; see list of Republic of Singapore Air Force squadrons
- 203d Aero Squadron, Air Service, United States Army
- 203rd Air Refueling Squadron, United States Air Force
- 203d RED HORSE Squadron, United States Air Force
- VFA-203, United States Navy
- VMAT-203, United States Marine Corps
