= Air Force Manpower Analysis Agency =

U.S. Air Force field operating agency

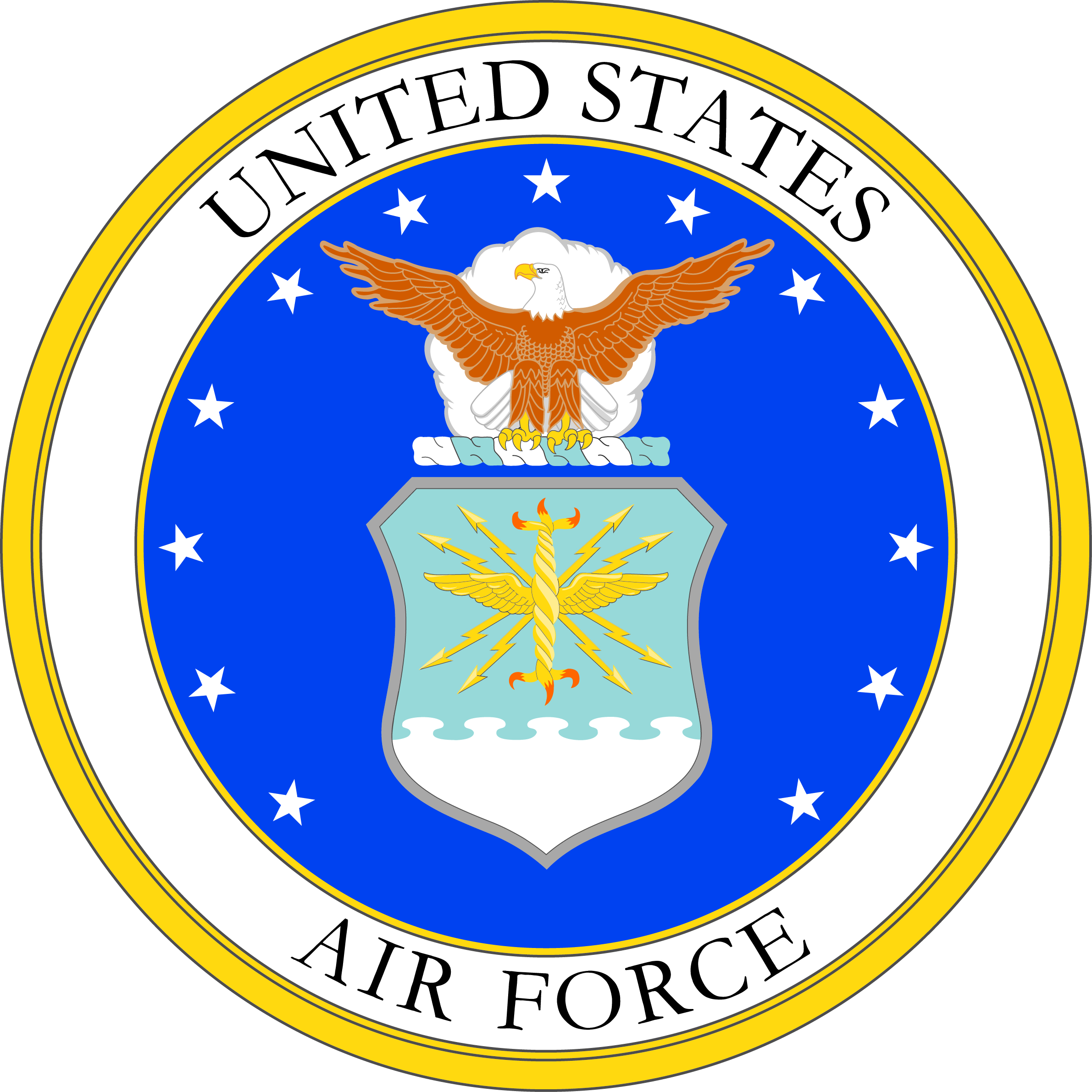
Air Force Manpower Analysis Agency
- Active: 1975–2012; 2015–present
- Country: United States
- Branch: United States Air Force
- Part of: United States Air Force
- Garrison/HQ: Joint Base San Antonio-Randolph

Commanders
- Current commander: Colonel Col Carl R. Pawling

Insignia
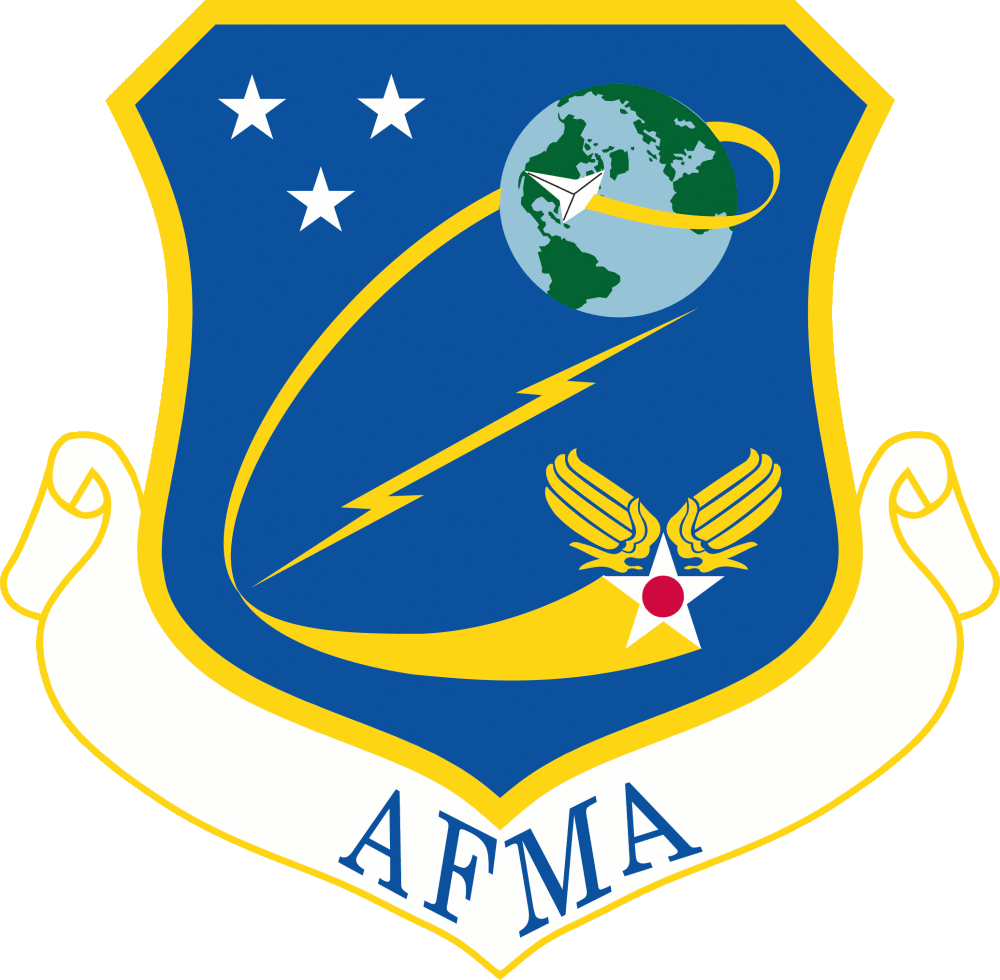
- Air Force Manpower Analysis Agency emblem

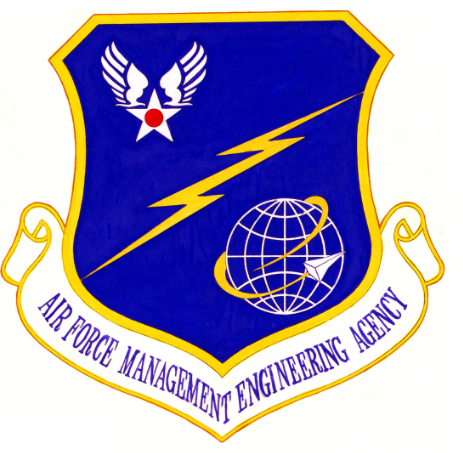
- Air Force Management Engineering Agency emblem (Note: Approved 15 October 1996.)

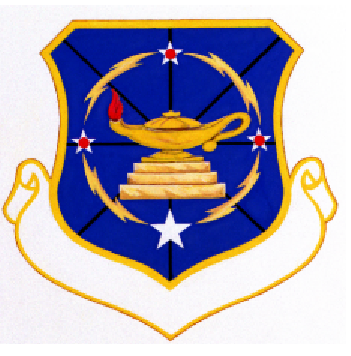
- Original Air Force Management Engineering Agency emblem

The Air Force Manpower Analysis Agency is a Field Operating Agency of the United States Air Force. It was reactivated in 2015 after inactivation in 2012 at Joint Base San Antonio. It provided Air Force leaders at all levels with tools to identify manpower required to accomplish the USAF mission.

== Mission ==
The Air Force Manpower Analysis Agency was originally established in 1975 as the Air Force Management Engineering Agency, a Separate Operating Agency of the United States Air Force (USAF) when USAF decided it needed an agency to provide technical guidance and central direction to its management engineering program. Its mission throughout its existence was to provide USAF leaders assistance in identifying manpower requirements for the effective and efficient accomplishment of the Air Force mission. In 1996, the agency merged with the Air Force Quality Institute and became the Air Force Center for Quality and Management Innovation. It received its current designation in 2003.

The agency, through its four major divisions and five subordinate manpower requirement squadrons, developed manpower requirements determination tools and manpower programming factors. Additionally, it managed Air Force performance management and innovation programs, including awards programs such as the Air Force Chief of Staff Team Excellence Award and the Zuckert Award. AFMA executed the Air Force competitive sourcing program and conducted special studies. The agency also assisted combatant commanders in determining military essential requirements in support of warfighting scenarios, supported the manpower functional community, and was home to the Air Force Survey Office, which provided attitude and opinion survey tools such as the Air Force Climate Survey. Starting in 1992, the agency took over the field management engineering teams that had been assigned to USAF's Major Commands and reorganized them on a functional basis. In 1995 was redesignated a Field Operating Agency (FOA). Starting at the end of 2004, it reorganized, replacing its teams with numbered squadrons and flights. AFMA was realigned under the Air Force Personnel Center on 1 June 2012 and later reactivated as the Air Force Manpower Analysis Agency (AFMAA) on 1 June 2015.

== Lineage ==
- Constituted as the Air Force Manpower Engineering Agency and activated on 1 November 1975

Redesignated the Air Force Center for Quality and Management Innovation on 19 December 1996
Redesignated Air Force Manpower and Innovation Agency on 1 September 1999
Redesignated Air Force Manpower Agency on 1 December 2003
Inactivated on 1 June 2012, resources aligned under the Air Force Personnel Center
Redesignated as Air Force Manpower Analysis Agency, and activated on 1 June 2015

=== Assignments ===
- HQ, United States Air Force, 1 November 1975
- Air Force Manpower and Personnel Center, 1 June 1978
- HQ, United States Air Force, 1 March 1985 – 1 June 2012

=== Stations ===
- Washington, DC, 1 November 1975 – unknown
- Randolph Air Force Base, (later Joint Base San Antonio-Randolph), Texas, unknown −1 June 2012

=== Subordinate Units ===
Squadrons

- The Air Force Manpower Requirements Determination Squadron, co-located at Randolph Air Force Base, Texas, was activated in November 2001 and was redesignated as the 1st Manpower Requirements Squadron in December 2004. The squadrons were inactivated.
- 1st Manpower Requirements Squadron (Air Force Manpower Requirements Determination Squadron November 2001 to December 2004), Joint Base San Antonio, Texas
- 2d Manpower Requirements Squadron, Joint Base Langley-Eustis, Va.
- 4th Manpower Requirements Squadron, Peterson AFB, Co.

Flights

- Air Force Manpower Readiness Flight (Note: Assigned to AF Manpower Requirements Utilization Squadron until October 2003, inactivated 1 September 2004.)
- 6th Manpower Requirements Flight (Note: Earlier 7200th Management Engineering Squadron.) Inactivated
- 7th Manpower Requirements Flight Inactivated

Management Engineering Teams (MET)

- Air Force Civil Engineering MET (later Air Force Civil Engineer MET, 2d Manpower Requirements Squadron)

NASA Langley Research Center, Virginia

- Air Force Comptroller MET
- Air Force Data Automation MET (later Air Force Communications-Computer MET, 3d Manpower Requirements Squadron)

Scott AFB, Illinois

- Air Force Engineering and Services MET
- Air Force Intelligence MET
- Air Force Joint Healthcare MET
- Air Force Logistics MET
- Air Force Maintenance MET (later 5th Manpower Requirements Squadron)

Tinker AFB, Oklahoma

- Air Force Maintenance and Supply MET (later Air Force Maintenance, Supply and Munitions MET)
- Air Force Medical MET (later 7th Manpower Requirements Flight)
- Air Force Mission Support MET (Note: Consolidated 1 November 2004 with Manpower Requirements Determination Squadron.)
- Air Force Security Police MET
- Air Force Special Staff MET (later 4th Manpower Requirements Squadron)

Buckley AFB Annex, Colorado

=== Awards ===

- Air Force Organizational Excellence Award
- 1 December 1999 – 30 November 2011
- 1 September 2003 – 31 August 2005
- 1 September 2005 – 31 December 2006

== See also ==
- List of United States Air Force Field Operating Agencies
- Structure of the United States Air Force: Field Operating Agency
