= Air Force Flight Standards Agency =

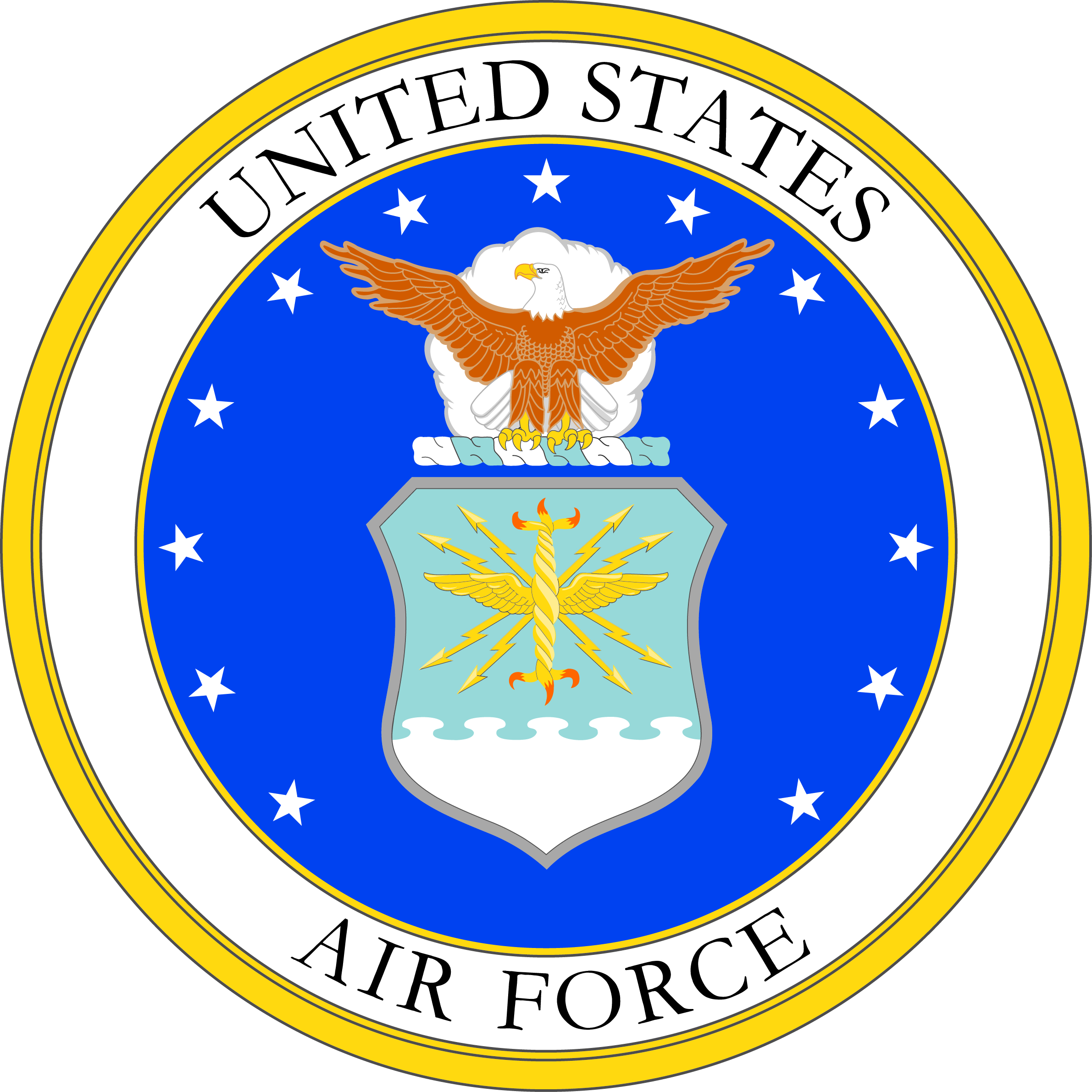
Air Force Flight Standards Agency

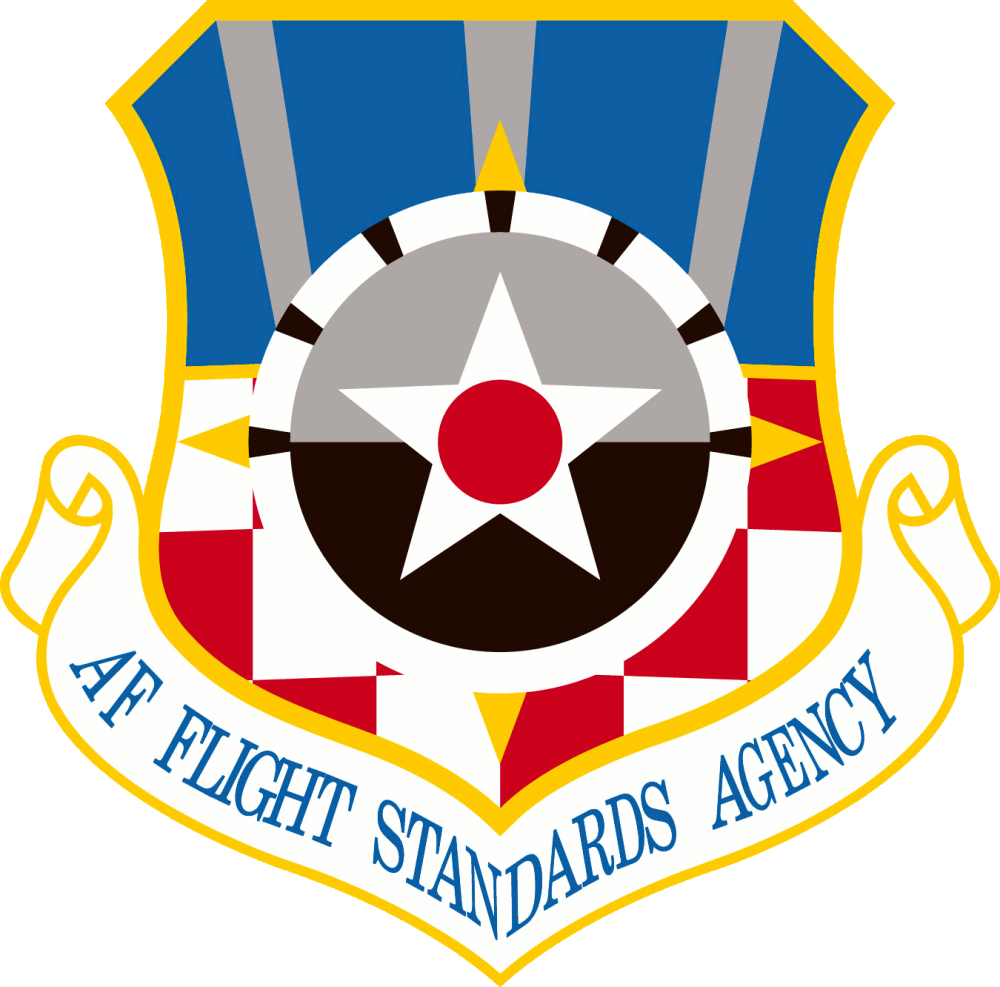
- Air Force Flight Standards Agency emblem
- Active: 1 October 1991 – present
- Country: United States
- Branch: United States Air Force
- Part of: United States Air Force
- Garrison/HQ: Oklahoma City

Commanders
- Current commander: Col Rudolf W. Kuehne, Jr.

The Air Force Flight Standards Agency operates as a U.S. Air Force Field Operating Agency operating under the direction of the Headquarters of the U.S. Air Force. It maximizes the effectiveness of Air Force global air operations by ensuring access to worldwide airspace in all weather conditions. The agency does this by providing accurate, relevant, and timely flight information and support services to Department of Defense, national, and coalition aviators. It also acts as lead command for the creation and application of criteria, procedures, and precision equipment for worldwide instrument flight operations, air traffic control, airfield management, and air traffic control and landing systems for the Air Force. AFFSA evaluates and capitalizes on emerging technologies to ensure unrestricted access to domestic and international airspace. It partners with Federal Aviation Administration, sister services, major commands, coalition partners, and host nations to maintain the consistency and accuracy of more than 81 airfields, 1,092 navigation systems and 8,214 instrument approach procedures worldwide. It performs combat flight inspections, oversees the Air Force airfield operations standardization program and instructs the Air Force Advanced Instrument School.
