= Air Force Center for Engineering and the Environment =

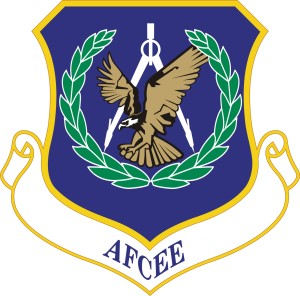
- Founded: 1991
- Part of: Air Force Civil Engineer
- Location: Port San Antonio, Texas

In the US, the Air Force Center for Engineering and the Environment (AFCEE) merged with the Air Force Real Property Agency and the Air Force Civil Engineer Support Agency to form the Air Force Civil Engineer Center on 1 October 2012.

AFCEE, formerly the Air Force Center for Environmental Excellence, was a Field Operating Agency (FOA) of the United States Air Force that provided a full range of technical and professional services to the Air Force community in areas related to environmental restoration, pollution prevention, environmental planning, design and construction management, and comprehensive planning and design. Regional Environmental Offices (REOs) represented the Air Force to federal, state, and local agencies to facilitate regional environmental compliance and management.

Before the AFCEE was formed, there was not one centralized office where Air Force commanders could go for assistance with their installation's environmental and construction programs. That situation changed in 1991, when AFCEE was approved and created as a field operating agency of the Air Force Civil Engineer.

== History ==
AFCEE was formed by consolidating a variety of Air Force personnel and assets located throughout the country, including several Air Force Regional Civil Engineer staff functions.

The center was formally inaugurated with a ribbon-cutting ceremony in Brooks AFB Hangar 9 on 3 November 1991. It originally consisted of four major elements: the Environmental Services Office, the Construction Management Office, the Design Group, and three Regional Compliance Offices (later renamed Regional Environmental Offices).

Staff elements included Mission Support, Environmental and Contract Law, and Public Affairs. In addition, a division from the Human Systems Contracting Directorate was assigned to AFCEE to provide the center with dedicated environmental contracting support.

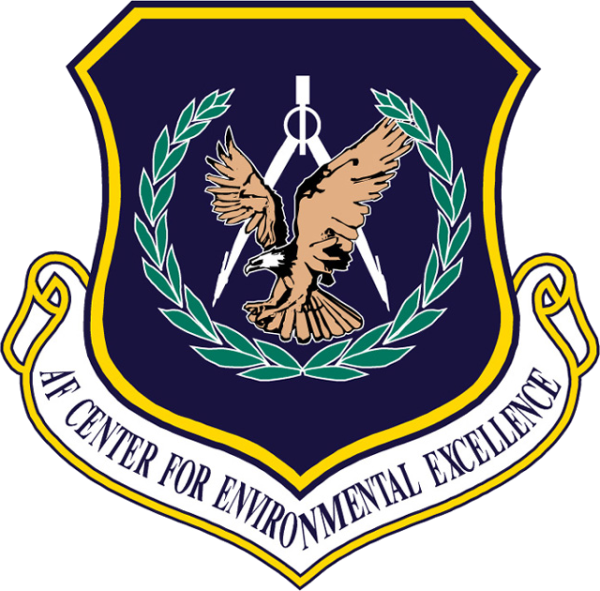
Air Force Center for Environmental Excellence

The center, which had started out with only a handful of people, grew rapidly and within a year had in place a full service array of environmental cleanup contracts. Its concentration was on the 19 installations affected by Rounds I and II of the Base Realignment and Closure process.

AFCEE underwent reorganization in 1994. A major change was the transition of the Pollution Prevention and Environmental Planning Divisions of the Environmental Services Directorate into two separate directorates. The execution directorates thus were: Construction Management, Design Group, Environmental Conservation and Planning, Environmental Restoration, and Pollution Prevention.

AFCEE did not have a building of its own when it first began operations. Employees worked in different facilities throughout Brooks, some in leased modular buildings. However, in July 1994 ground was broken for the new, nearly 73,000 square foot (6,800 square meter) headquarters building. A year later, a ribbon-cutting ceremony formally inaugurated the center's new home.

Organizational streamlining took place in April 1997, with Construction Management and the Design Group merging into one organization called the Design and Construction Directorate. In other changes, the Pollution Prevention Directorate was renamed the Environmental Quality Directorate and the former Design Group's Planning Division moved to the Environmental Conservation and Planning Directorate, completing the establishment of a Comprehensive Planning Division.

== Personnel and resources ==
The agency employed more than 500 authorized civilians and 48 military members. In addition to its in-house staff, AFCEE had many of the nation's most respected and capable contractors as its partners. The center's multibillion-dollar contracting capacity covered the entire spectrum of environmental and construction management services.

== Organization ==
A civilian director, a member of the Senior Executive Service, headed the center. An executive director, an Air Force colonel also served as the commander of the center's military personnel, assisted the director. They led an organization composed of five business line directorates, a technical directorate, three regional environmental offices and four support directorates. The business line directorates were designed to provide direct services to specific customers and to act as their single point of contact for most AFCEE work.

== Operations ==
=== Environmental restoration ===
AFCEE performed "cradle-to-grave" management for base environmental restoration that spans the full spectrum of cleanup activities, from preliminary assessment/site investigation to remedial action, remedial process optimization, and site close out. The Center served as the primary restoration agent and consultant to the Air Force Real Property Agency (AFRPA) and major commands (MAJCOMs) for designated bases. It also provided technical assistance to Headquarters, United States Air Force (HQ USAF) and MAJCOMs on issues affecting restoration policy and guidance, and munitions response program development. It was also the Air Force agent for restoration technology transfer. AFCEE identified and validated environmental research and development requirements, managed demonstration projects, and maintained technical libraries. The Center provided technical support to the Air Force Legal Services Agency's Environmental Law and Litigation Division, and the Department of Justice on issues relating to Air Force Third Party Site environmental liabilities.
