= 819th RED HORSE Squadron =

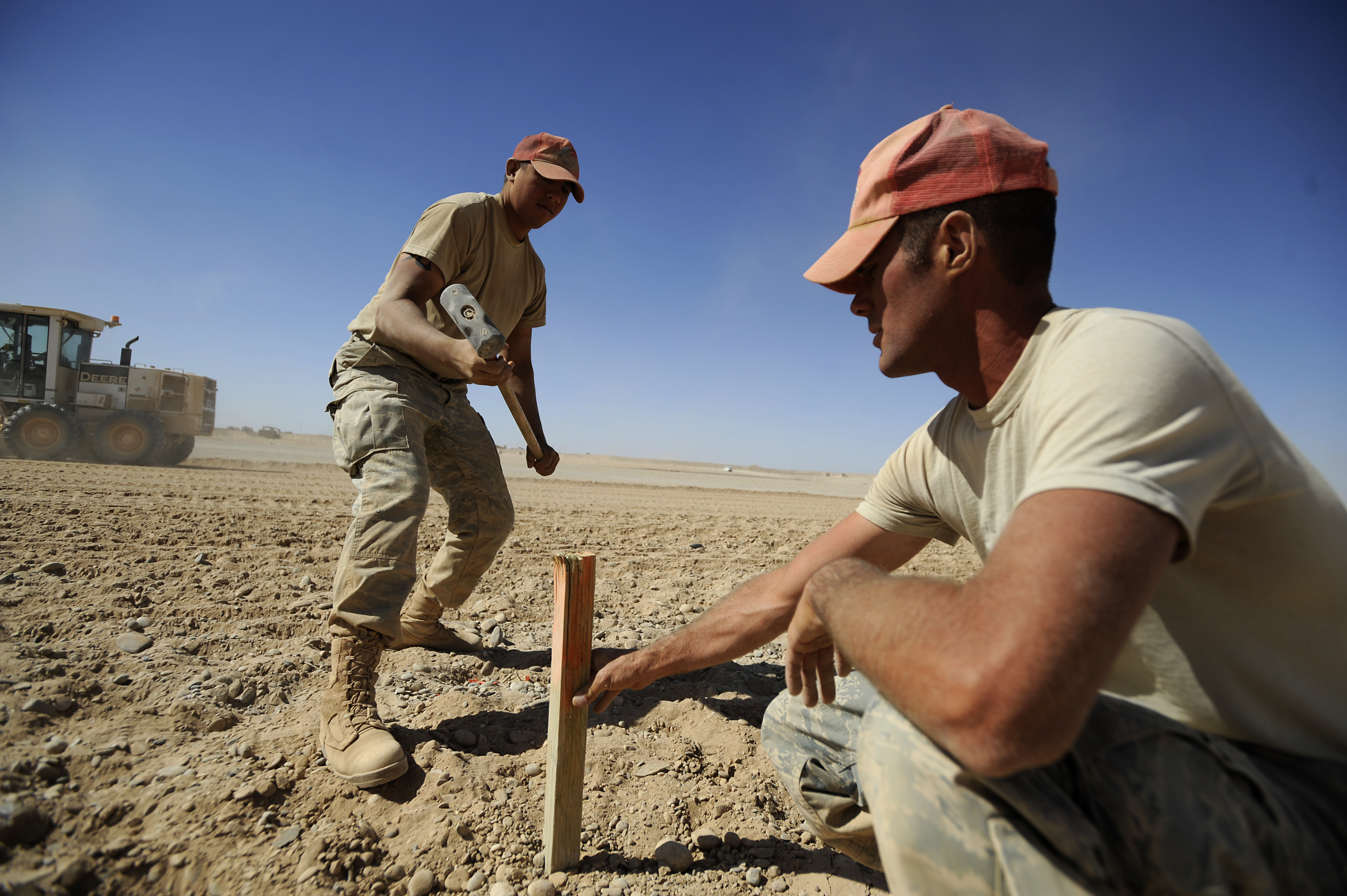
- Squadron members deployed to FOB Dwyer
- Active: 1956–1962; 1966–1990; 1997–present
- Country: United States
- Branch: United States Air Force
- Role: Civil Engineer
- Garrison/HQ: Malmstrom Air Force Base, Montana
- Mottos: Lead, Follow, Or Get The Hell Out Of The Way
- Engagements: Vietnam War
- Decorations: Air Force Outstanding Unit Award with Combat "V" Device; Air Force Outstanding Unit Award; Republic of Vietnam Gallantry Cross with Palm

Commanders
- Current commander: Lt Col. Nathan R. Smith

Insignia
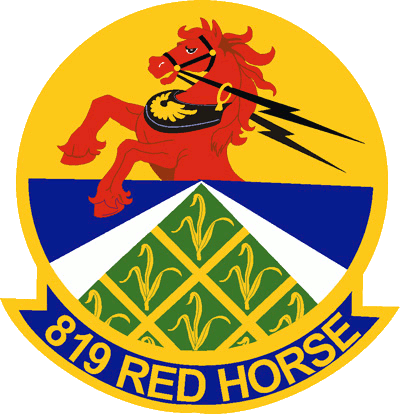
- 819th RED HORSE Squadron emblem (approved 22 July 1966)

The 819th RED HORSE Squadron is a unit of civil engineers based at Malmstrom Air Force Base, Montana, who are responsible for heavy duty repairs around the world. Originally activated at Dyess Air Force Base, Texas, the unit has been active and inactive at several different bases over the last 55 years. The unit was most recently activated as the first ever Air Force-Air National Guard RED HORSE associate unit at Malmstrom on 1 June 1997. The unit is ready at all times to fully deploy to anywhere in the world and remain stationed for an indefinite amount of time. The squadron's most notable deployment was in Vietnam, where it received numerous awards for its work during the war.

== Mission ==
The 819th Squadron's mission is to "rapidly mobilize people, equipment, and heavy construction vehicles to anywhere in the world where air power must be employed." The squadron specifically trains to be able to rapidly deploy and remain self-sufficient for an indefinite length of time. During wartime, the main responsibility for the squadron is to do heavy repairs on Air Force facilities, including runway systems. The squadron also provides support on weapon systems used to guard a base in hostile environments. In non-wartime, the unit is responsible for training to be ready for wartime responsibilities. To do this, the unit participates in training competitions, humanitarian programs, as well as base renovations and construction.

== History ==
Originally in Abilene, Texas, and later at Dyess AFB, the 819th RED HORSE squadron was first known as the 819th installations squadron on 15 June 1956. It was designated the 819th Civil Engineering Squadron before it was inactivated at Dyess on 25 June 1961. The unit was activated and re-designated again at Forbes AFB as the 819th Civil Engineering Squadron (Heavy Repair). The unit was moved to Thailand to organize and then deployed to Phù Cát Air Base, South Vietnam, in May 1966. The unit was responsible for heavy construction at the base, completing much of the base and its facilities. The unit installed more than 5,000 feet (1,500 m) of aircraft revetments along with moving over 1,500,000 cubic yards (1,100,000 m^{3}) of earth. The unit remained at Phù Cát until 1970, when it was moved to Tuy Hoa AB, Vietnam to close the base. The unit returned from Vietnam in April 1970 to Westover AFB until it was assigned to McConnell AFB in 1973. In 1979, the unit was stationed at RAF Wethersfield, UK, to be in charge of runway repairs for US forces in Europe and also its original job as a heavy repair unit. The unit was inactivated in August 1990 and would remain inactive until 1 June 1997, when it was activated at Malmstrom AFB as the first ever Air Force-Air National Guard RED HORSE associate unit.

=== Vietnam ===
The 819th RED HORSE squadron was stationed at Phu Cat AB and was responsible for building facilities in the former Viet Cong training area. The 819th unit was the only unit at the base to operate and maintain heavy equipment. The men from the squadron were responsible for the installment of T-17 membrane and AM 2 matting along with all the earth moving required to build revetments. To build all the buildings and roads for the base, the 819th had to move over 1,000,000 cubic yards (760,000 m^{3}) of earth. The operation and base construction went very smoothly because the 819th made sure that all equipment was operating properly along with preemptive maintenance. Daily maintenance was required for all machinery. This upkeep made it possible to complete the mission quickly and effectively. One of the largest challenges for the Logistics section was the acquisition of materials and food because the base was at the end of the supply line. In a single year, the 819th Civil Engineering Squadron was incredibly productive: "They had moved 1.659 million cubic yards of earth, poured 15,500 cubic yards of concrete, and constructed buildings totaling 633,000 square feet. In addition, they had placed 2.1 million square feet of AM-2 matting, finished over 50,000 linear feet of utility lines, fences and storm drainage facilities, erected more than 5,000 linear feet of aircraft revetments and completed more than 5 miles of road". From the Phu Cat A.B. the 819th deployed unit 1 to Pleiku A.B. in the Central Highlands. Detached Unit 1 constructed barracks, buildings, laid runway matting and erected aircraft revetments. Typical duties included, hands on construction work, supervision of Vietnamese civilian workers. Much of the mission in 1967-1968-1969 involved repairing damage from 122MM Rocket and 82MM Mortar attacks due to constant Vietcong and NVA activity in the area. The unit members routinely ran convoys off base under their own security for supplies and to safely pick up and return civilian employees. Members worked 14-hour days with Sundays off.

=== Recent History ===
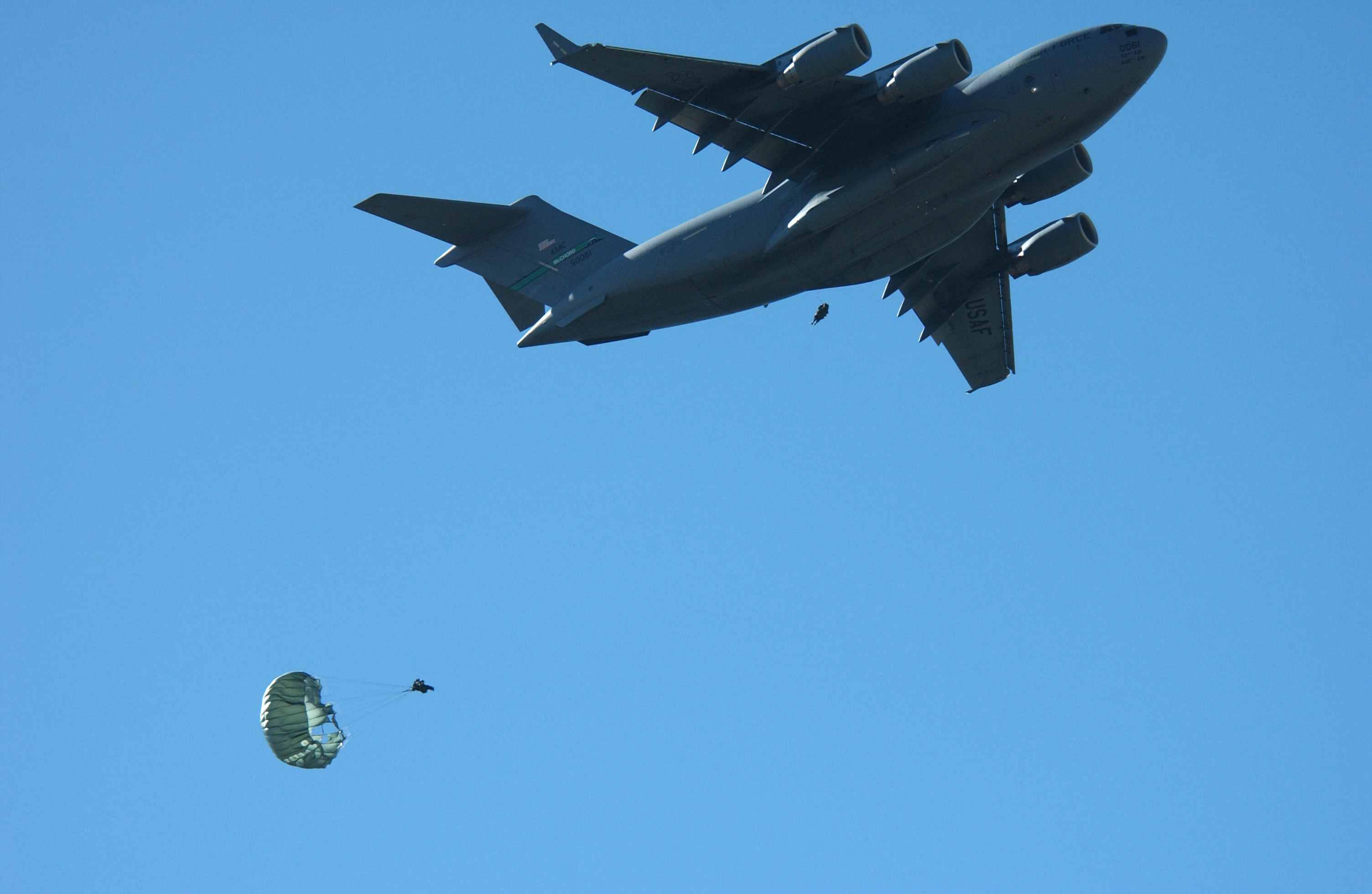
Members of the 819th RED HORSE Squadron's Airborne Flight jump from a C-17 at Malmstrom Air Force Base, 2005

In recent years, the 819th RED HORSE squadron has been active in non-war zones to improve infrastructure and provide support to bases around the world. In November 1998, the 819th along with members of the 820th, went to Central America to repair damages to infrastructure done by Hurricane Mitch. In October 2000, the 819th deployed to Prince Sultan Air base to pave a dirt munitions road. The road was making travel difficult, so the unit paved over a mile of road. By February 2003, the 819th established an airborne capability by training with the U.S. Army and Air Force Civil Engineer Support Agency. The unit trained to establish MARES so that they could work on airfields around the world. After training, the 819th completed several projects in Southwest Asia, and supported Operation Enduring Freedom and Iraqi Freedom by participating in large construction projects at several bases. In 2014 the 819th RHS was targeted for downsizing and possible closure or relocated to Guam and be combined with the 554th RHS. The downsizing never took place but the 819th RED HORSE took a major hit to its manpower.

== Lineage ==
- Constituted as the 819th Installation Squadron on 23 April 1956

Activated on 15 June 1956
Redesignated 819th Civil Engineering Squadron on 1 July 1960
Inactivated on 25 June 1962

- Redesignated 819th Civil Engineering Squadron (Heavy Repair) and activated (not organized)

Organized on 8 March 1966
Redesignated 819th Civil Engineering Squadron,, Heavy Repair on 15 October 1969
Redesignated 819th RED HORSE Civil Engineering Squadron on 1 March 1989
Inactivated on 31 August 1990

- Redesignated 819th RED HORSE Squadron

Activated on 2 June 1997

=== Assignments ===
- 819th Air Base Group (later 819th Combat Support Group) 15 June 1956 – 25 June 1961
- Tactical Air Command, 8 March 1966
- Seventh Air Force, April 1966
- 1st Civil Engineering Group, 15 May 1967
- Seventh Air Force, March 1970
- Strategic Air Command, 15 April 1970
- Third Air Force, 8 April 1979 – 31 August 1990
- Twelfth Air Force, 2 June 1997
- Eighth Air Force, October 2002

=== Stations ===
- Dyess Air Force Base, Texas, 15 June 1956 – 25 June 1961
- Forbes Air Force Base, Kansas, 12 January 1966
- Ban Sattahip Royal Thai Naval Airfield, Thailand, 8 March 1966
- Phu Cat Air Base, South Vietnam, 10 May 1966
- Detachment 1 Plieku, RVN 1967-
- Tuy Hoa Air Base, South Vietnam, 1 January 1970
- Westover Air Force Base, Massachusetts, 15 April 1970
- McConnell Air Force Base, Kansas, 15 September 1973
- RAF Wethersfield, England, 8 April 1979 – 31 August 1990
- Malmstrom Air Force Base, Montana, 2 June 1997 – present

== Awards ==
The 819th RED HORSE unit has received many awards and streamers for its work, mostly during the Vietnam War. The 819th received ten outstanding unit awards, the Republic of Vietnam Gallantry Cross with Palm, and the following Campaign Streamers:

- Vietnam Air 1966
- Vietnam Air Offensive 1966-1967
- Vietnam Air Offensive, Phase II 1967-1968
- Vietnam Air/Ground 1968
- Vietnam Air Offensive, Phase III 1968
- Vietnam Air Offensive, Phase IV 1968-1969
- Tet 69/Counteroffensive 1969
- Vietnam Summer/Fall 1969
- Vietnam Winter/Spring 1969-1970
