= Air Force Civil Engineer Support Agency =

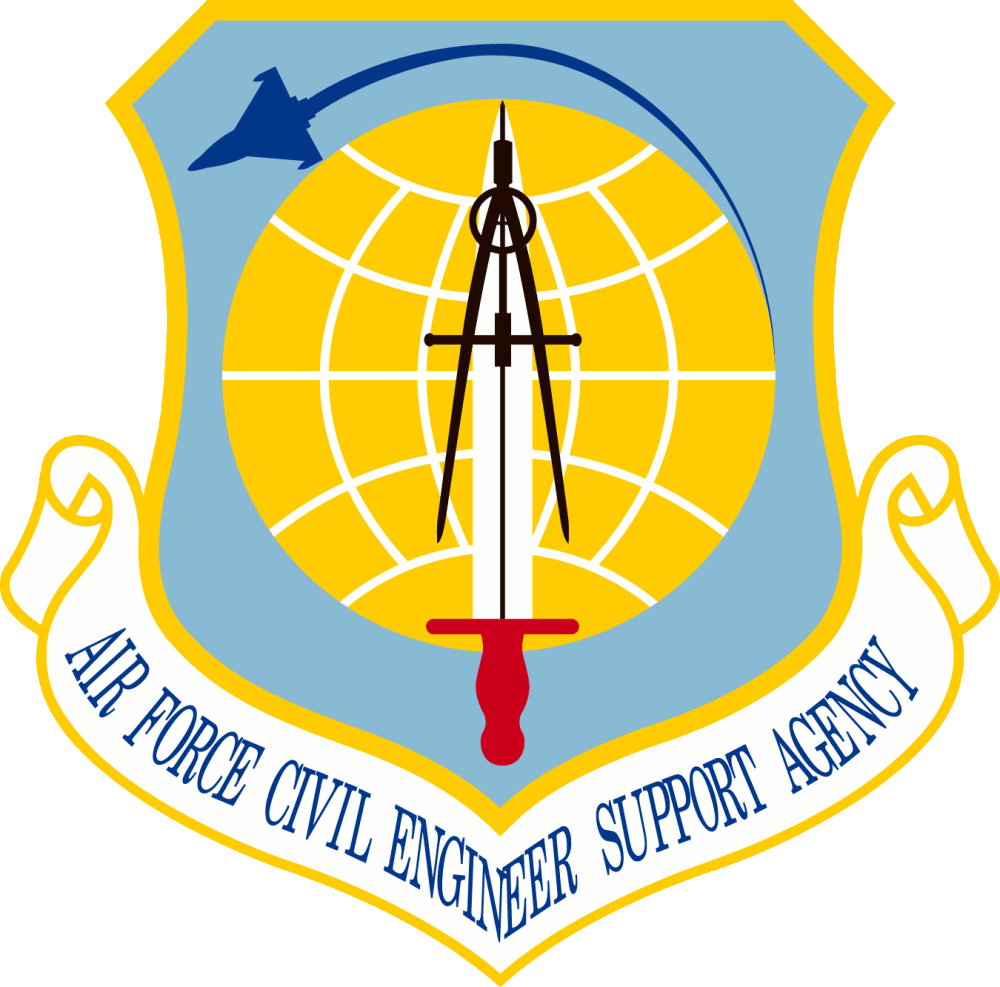
- Founded: 1991
- Part of: Secretary of the Air Force
- Location: Tyndall Air Force Base

The Air Force Civil Engineer Support Agency (AFCESA) merged with the Air Force Real Property Agency and the Air Force Center for Engineering and the Environment to form the Air Force Civil Engineer Center on 1 Oct. 2012.

AFCESA was a Field Operating Agency (FOA) of the United States Air Force. The agency managed contracts that provided civil engineer support to help restore and modernize buildings and infrastructure at Air Force bases around the world.

== History ==
AFCESA began as the Civil Engineer Construction Operations Group at Wright-Patterson Air Force Base, Ohio in 1966. Two years later, the new Civil Engineering Center incorporated the construction operations group's readiness and mobility functions.

In 1972, the Civil Engineering Center moved to Tyndall Air Force Base, Florida, and became the Air Force Civil Engineering Center. In 1977, the Air Force Engineering and Services Agency was formed after the Air Force combined the responsibilities of Civil Engineering and Services. The separate operating agency had headquarters at Kelly Air Force Base, Texas. Then, in 1978, the Air Force Engineering and Services Center was activated at Tyndall Air Force Base, Fla.

In early 1991, the center's policy functions were transferred to the Office of the Civil Engineer, Headquarters U.S. Air Force, making the Air Force Engineering and Services Center a field operating agency. The name of the organization changed to Air Force Civil Engineering Support Agency on 1 August 1991, and later became the Air Force Civil Engineer Support Agency in 1994.

== See also ==
- Military engineering of the United States
- Prime Base Engineer Emergency Force
- Rapid Engineer Deployable Heavy Operational Repair Squadron Engineers
