= Air Force Audit Agency =

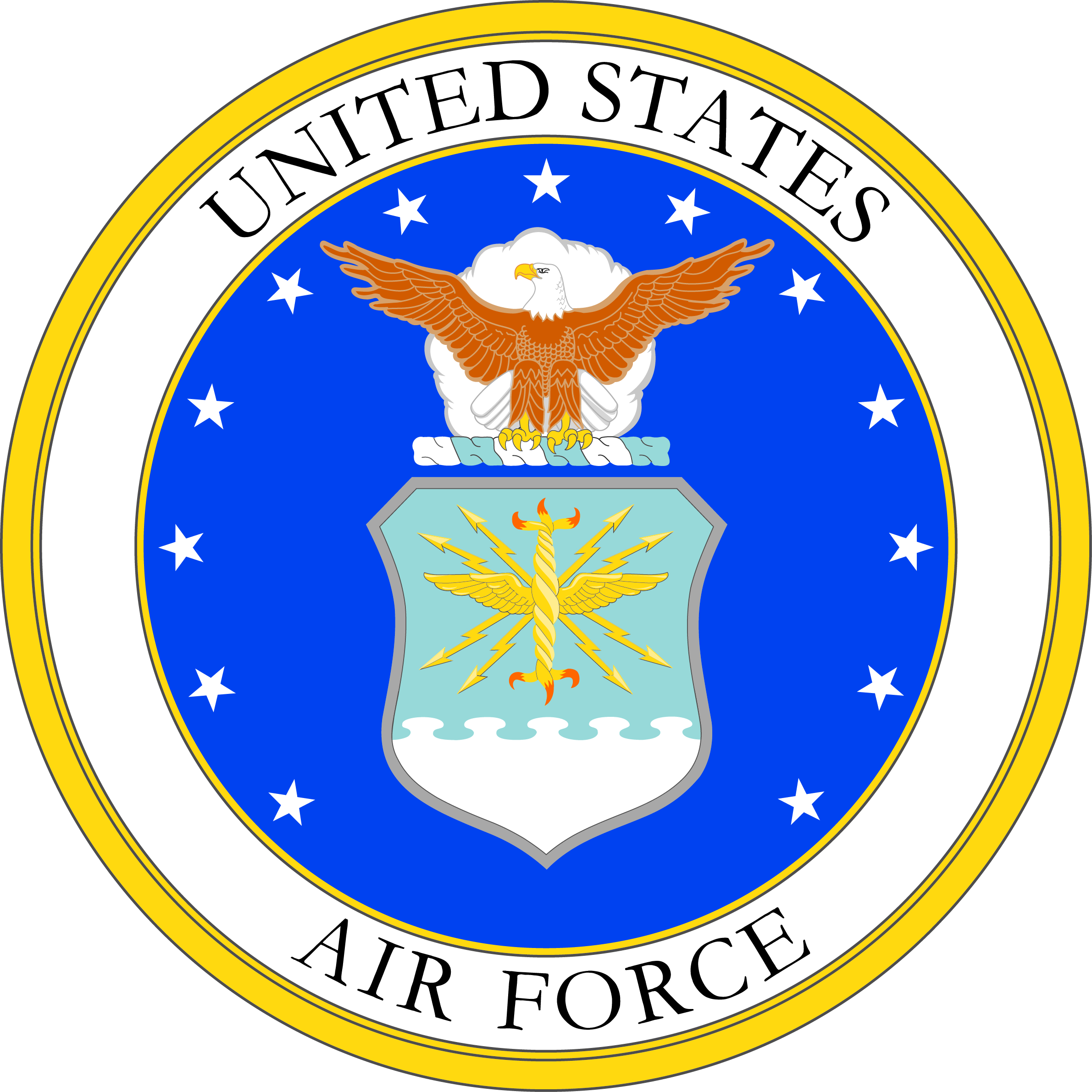
Air Force Audit Agency

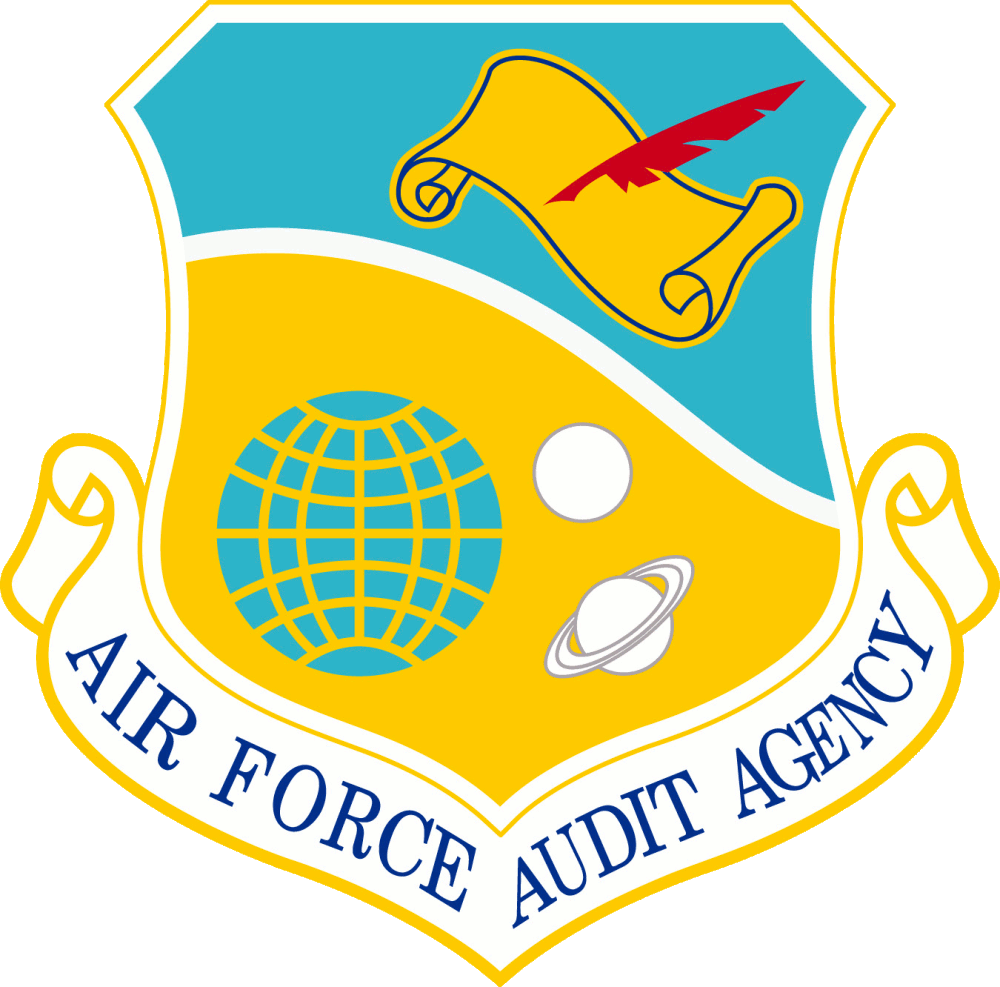
- Agency emblem
- Active: 31 December 1971 – present
- Country: United States
- Branch: United States Air Force
- Type: Field operating agency
- Role: Audit services
- Part of: Secretary of the Air Force
- Headquarters: The Pentagon, Arlington, Virginia
- Decorations: Air Force Outstanding Unit Award Air Force Organizational Excellence Award
- Website: Official website

Commanders
- Auditor General: Douglas M. Bennett

The Air Force Audit Agency is a Field Operating Agency of the United States Air Force that provides all levels of Air Force management with audit services and assesses Air Force financial stewardship and the accuracy of financial reporting.

== History ==
=== Background ===
The 1030th USAF Auditor General Group was organized on 1 July 1948 at the Pentagon to provide auditing services for the Air Force. It moved to Norton Air Force Base on 1 August 1965. After transitioning its functions to the Air Force Audit Agency, it was inactivated on 1 May 1972.

=== Formation of the agency ===
The Air Force Audit Agency was designated as separate operating agency under the Comptroller of the Air Force on 31 December 1971. On 24 July 1978, it was transferred under the Secretary of the Air Force with oversight from the Assistant Secretary of the Air Force.

In 1986, the Department of Defense reorganization resulted in significant changes within the Secretariat of the Air Force. The Auditor General of the Air Force then reported directly to the Secretary of the Air Force, with no oversight or supervision from other Secretariat offices.

== Lineage ==
- Constituted as the Air Force Audit Agency and activated as a separate operating agency on 31 December 1971
- Status changed to a field operating agency on 5 February 1991

== Decorations ==
- Air Force Outstanding Unit Award
- Air Force Organization Excellence Award

== See also ==
- List of United States Air Force Field Operating Agencies
