= Air Force Cost Analysis Agency =

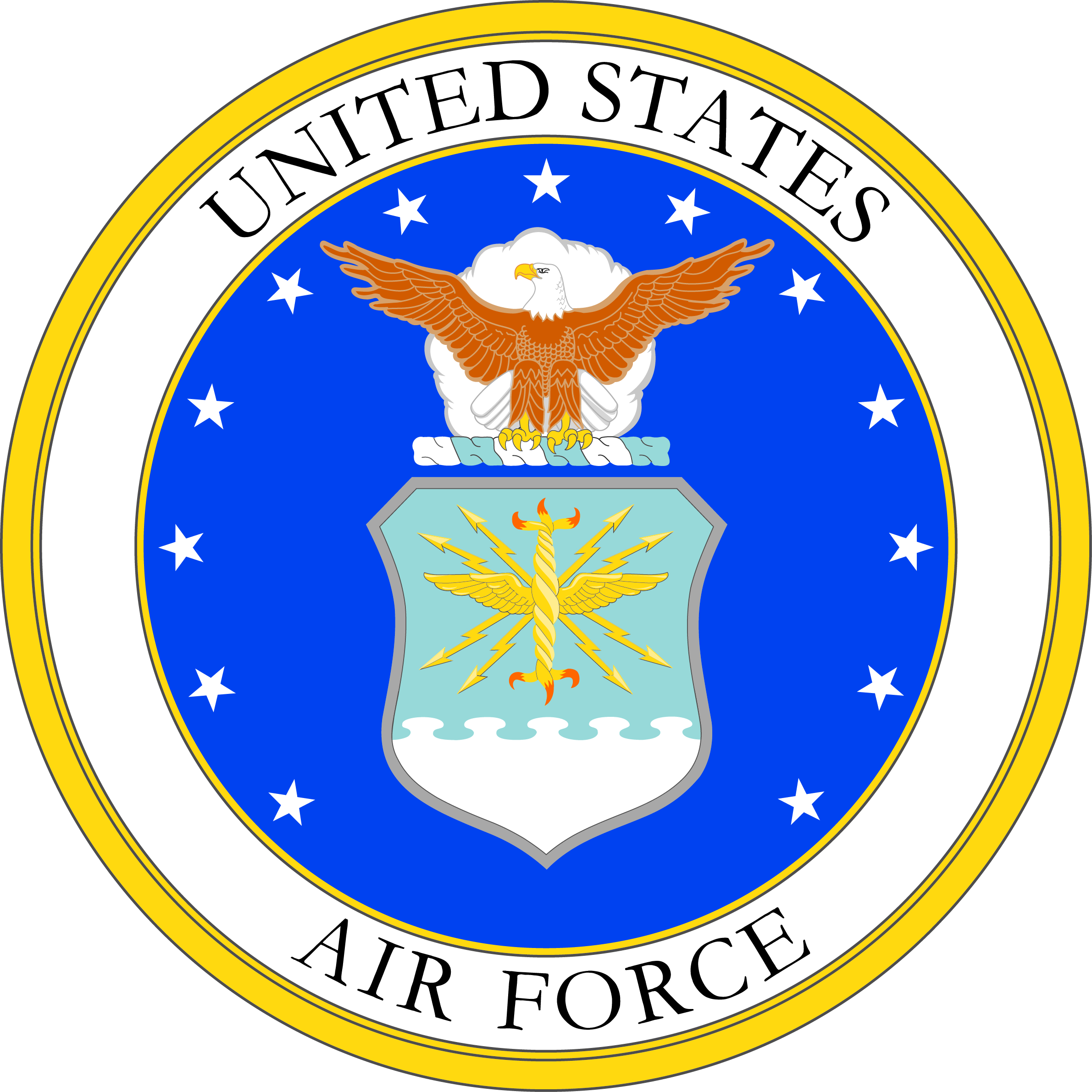
Air Force Cost Analysis Agency

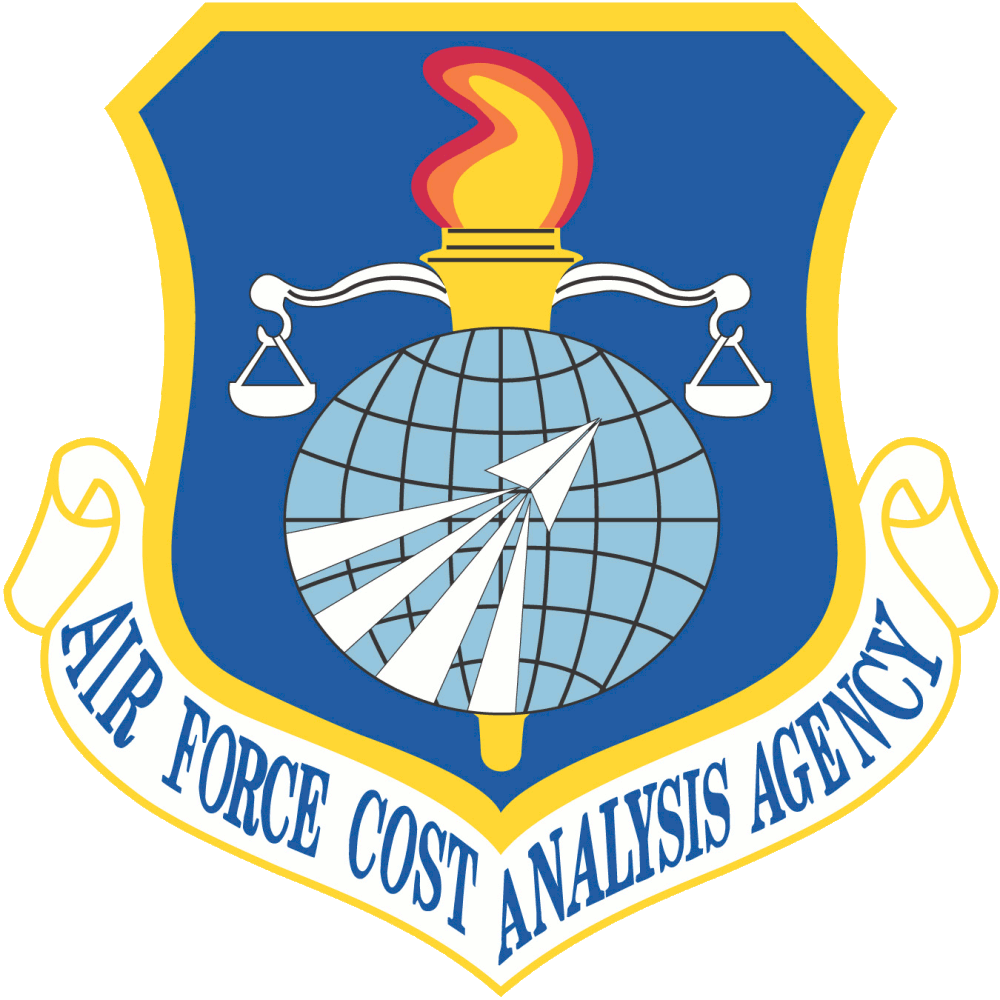
- Agency emblem
- Active: 15 June 1986 – present
- Country: United States
- Branch: United States Air Force
- Type: Field operating agency
- Role: Cost analysis
- Part of: United States Air Force
- Location: Joint Base Andrews

The Air Force Cost Analysis Agency performs independent component cost analyses for major Air Force system programs as required by public law and Department of Defense policy, or those of special interest. It is responsible for cost estimating and for enhancing the state-of-the-art in cost analysis. It provides guidance, analytical support, and quantitative risk analyses to 11 major commands and the Air Force corporate staff on development of cost per flying-hour factors and resource requirements. AFCAA performs special studies supporting long-range planning, force structure, Analysis of Alternatives, and life-cycle cost analyses.

== Lineage ==
- Constituted as the Air Force Cost Center and activated as a direct reporting unit on 15 June 1986

Status changed to a field operating agency on 5 February 1991
Redesignated Air Force Cost Analysis Agency on 1 August 1991
