= Air Force Office of Energy Assurance =

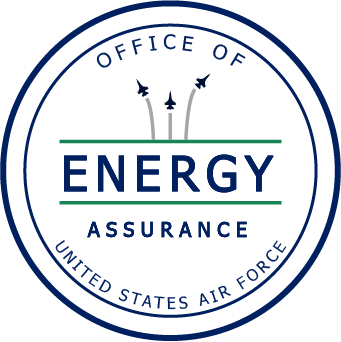
Air Force Office of Energy Assurance logo

The Office of Energy Assurance (OEA) was established by the United States secretary of the Air Force and chief of staff of the Air Force in February 2016 to serve as a central management office dedicated to strategic energy and resiliency.

OEA serves as an extension of the Air Force Civil Engineer Center and in conjunction with the Office of the Assistant Secretary of the Air Force for Energy, Installations and Environment to ensure alignment with Air Force priorities. OEA develops, implements, and oversees an integrated facility energy portfolio, including privately financed, large-scale renewable and alternative energy projects as well as direct Air Force investments. OEA leverages partnerships with the Army's Office of Energy Initiatives and the Navy’s Resilient Energy Program Office.
