= Air Force Real Property Agency =

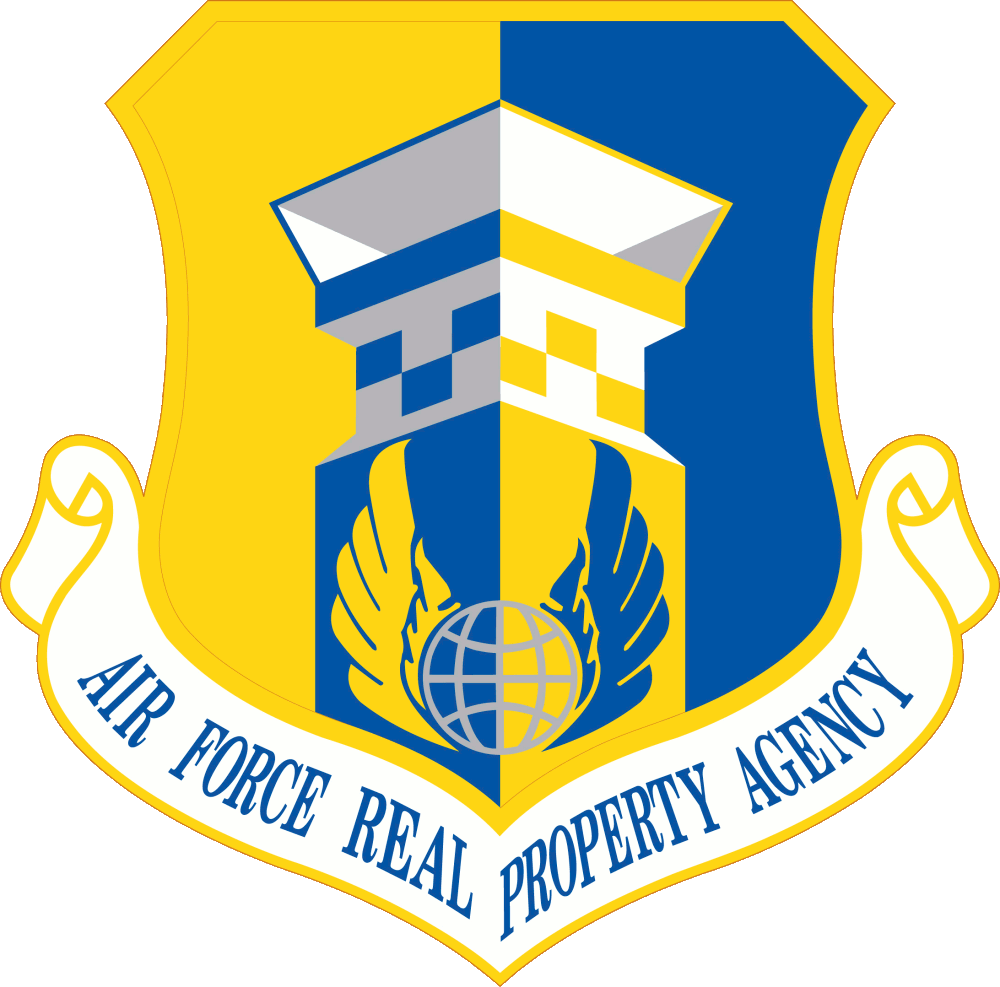
- Air Force Real Property Agency Shield
- Active: 1991 - 2012
- Country: United States
- Branch: United States Air Force
- Role: Property Management
- Garrison/HQ: Lackland Air Force Base

The Air Force Real Property Agency (AFRPA) merged with the Air Force Center for Engineering and the Environment and the Air Force Civil Engineer Support Agency to form the Air Force Civil Engineer Center on Oct. 1, 2012.

AFRPA acquired, disposed of and managed all Air Force-controlled real property worldwide. It was an agency within the office of the Assistant Secretary of the Air Force for Installations, Environment and Logistics.

== History ==
The Air Force Real Property Agency traced its roots to 15 November 1991, through the creation of the Air Force Base Disposal Agency, a field-operating agency that reported to the Office of the Assistant Secretary of the Air Force for Manpower, Reserve Affairs, Installations and Environment. The agency was created as the single focus for base conversion matters and the execution of environmental programs and real property disposal for major Air Force bases in the United States being closed or realigned under the authorities of the Base Closure and Realignment Act of 1988 and the Defense Base Closure and Realignment Act of 1990.

In 1993, the agency was renamed the Air Force Base Conversion Agency, a name that clearly identified its role in assisting BRAC communities through the process of closing and realigning bases from military to civilian reuse. AFBCA ensured that property at these Air Force installations was made available for reuse. The agency provided civilian reuse transition planning caretaker services to include installation protection, maintenance, and operations. Additionally the agency was responsible for environmental planning, compliance, and restoration and real property disposal.

The Secretary of the Air Force consolidated the Air Force Base Conversion Agency with the Air Force Real Estate Division to form the Air Force Real Property Agency 16 October 2002. The division managed real property acquisition and disposal for active Air Force installations worldwide. This transformation consolidated the Air Force's real property disposal and acquisition efforts for both active-duty and BRAC installations. The new agency reported to the Assistant Secretary of the Air Force for Installations, Environment and Logistics.
