= Builder (United States Navy) =

Seabee occupational rating in the U.S. Navy

Builder (SeaBee)
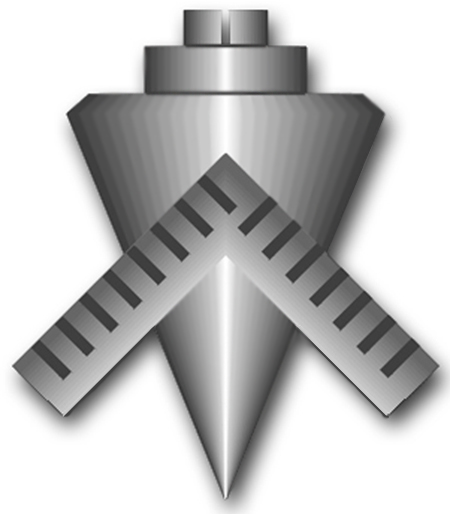
- Rating insignia
- Issued by: United States Navy
- Type: Enlisted rating
- Abbreviation: BU
- Specialty: Construction

Builder (abbreviated as BU) is a United States Navy occupational rating. A builder is responsible for the construction and repair of wood, concrete, and masonry structures. Their work can involve sheet rock, ceramic tile, or painting, while senior personnel deal with material estimates and labor projections. Builders also conduct the Navy's combat and disaster preparedness operations.

The builder's rating badge shows two traditional tools for construction - the carpenter's square and the plumb-bob.

At the senior chief petty officer level, the builder rating merges with the engineering aide and steelworker ratings. At this level, they are referred to as a senior chief constructionman (abbreviated as CUCS).

At the master chief petty officer level, they merge with all other construction ratings as a master chief seabee (abbreviated as CBCM).

== See also ==
- List of United States Navy ratings
