= Air Force Civil Engineer Center =

- Air Force Civil Engineer Center emblem
- Active: 1 October 2012 - present
- Country: United States
- Branch: United States Air Force
- Part of: Air Force Installation and Mission Support Center
- Garrison/HQ: Joint Base San Antonio

Commanders
- Current commander: Brigadier General Patrick G. Miller

The Air Force Civil Engineer Center (AFCEC), located at Joint Base San Antonio-Lackland, Texas, is a 1,900-person primary subordinate unit, assigned to the Air Force Installation and Mission Support Center which is one of six centers aligned under Air Force Materiel Command for the United States Air Force. The center is responsible for providing responsive, flexible full-spectrum installation engineering services. Conducting operations at more than 75 locations worldwide, the center's missions include facility investment planning, design and construction, operations support, real property management, energy support, environmental compliance and restoration, and audit assertions, acquisition and program management.

== History ==
Air Force leaders, during a ceremony on 1 October 2012 at Joint Base San Antonio-Lackland, Texas, activated AFCEC as a single unit to execute the civil engineering mission worldwide. During the ceremony, the Air Force Center for Engineering and the Environment and Air Force Real Property Agency, both based in San Antonio, merged with the Air Force Civil Engineer Support Agency at Tyndall Air Force Base, Florida. AFCESA was then renamed the Air Force Civil Engineer Center. On 1 October 2014, AFCEC was among the six organizations moved under Air Force Materiel Command in an effort toward forming the foundation of the Air Force Installation and Mission Support Center when the Center is formally activated in 2015.

== Organization ==
The Air Force Civil Engineer Center is led by a civilian in the Senior Executive Service. The center has seven directorates: Energy; Environmental; Facility Engineering; Installations; Operations; Planning & Integration; and Readiness.

- The Energy Directorate, located at Tyndall Air Force Base, Florida., consists of engineers, energy experts, contract officers and support staff who provide expertise to installations and major commands. They identify, evaluate and help implement technologies and funding strategies to reduce Air Force energy consumption and costs to meet federal energy goals.
- The Environmental Directorate is responsible for managing the Air Force restoration, compliance, sustainability and National Environmental Policy Act programs. The directorate members provide environmental technical assistance and advice to Air Force installations, major commands and other clients. The directorate develops execution strategies for environmental and sustainability issues, projects and programs based on best practices garnered from experience and research. This directorate manages installation support teams at various locations around the United States.
- The Facility Engineering Directorate provides centralized facility design and construction for military construction, restoration and modernization, sustainment, and military family housing. The directorate implements standardized designs for similar facility and infrastructure types and seeks other cost-reduction strategies such as packaging multiple single-facility requirements into "whole facility investments" and regional acquisition efforts. Subject Matter Experts (SME) in design and construction, including The Architect of the Air Force, provide guidance and expertise. The Air Force Comprehensive Asset Management Plan process enables the center and installation civil engineers to improve project delivery by increasing lead times for planning and design, ensuring earlier and more effective construction awards. In addition to several divisions in San Antonio, the directorate has division in the Pacific and European theaters of operations.
- The Installations Directorate, led by a civilian in the Senior Executive Service, conducts the strategic acquisition, management, and disposal of Air Force real property. The directorate executes the Deputy Assistant Secretary of the Air Force for Installations' land and facilities policies through a full suite of services, including appraisals, lease renewals, licenses, easements, title opinions, environmental cleanup and transfer of property impacted by Base Realignment and Closure legislation, and other support services.
- The Operations Directorate, located at Tyndall Air Force Base, Florida, provides direct technical, managerial and training expertise to the Air Force civil engineering community with an emphasis on operations and maintenance of the built environment.
- The Planning & Integration Directorate (P&I), provides a comprehensive framework to enable strategic and long-term planning for installation complexes to support the Air Force and its customers at the combined, joint, major command, and installation levels through development of investment strategies. The P&I Directorate is divided into three divisions: comprehensive planning, activity integration, and enterprise procurement. Planners provide input to the National Environmental Policy Act process, analyze installation complexes, and manage installation development and encroachment. Integrators analyze the Enterprise Activity Management Plan Program development investment, define and prioritize requirements, and advocate for facilities, utilities and transportation.
- The Readiness and Emergency Management Directorate, located at Tyndall Air Force Base, Florida, mission is to provide readiness and emergency services support to the Air Force civil engineer community through technical information and standardized methodology, enabling civil engineers worldwide to execute their expeditionary combat support and emergency services missions safely, effectively and efficiently.

== List of commanders ==
- Joe Sciabica, 1 October 2012
- Randy E. Brown, 16 July 2015
- Edwin H. Oshiba, 5 February 2018
- Terry G. Edwards, 30 October 2018
- Maj Gen John J. Allen, July 2020
- Brig Gen William H. Kale III, 9 August 2022
- Brig Gen Patrick G. Miller, 9 July 2024
