= Steelworker (United States Navy) =

Seabee occupational rating in the U.S. Navy

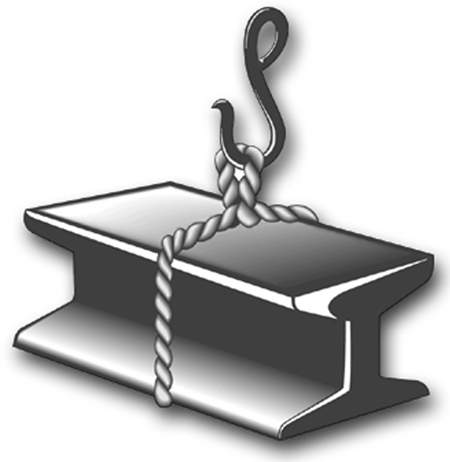
- Rating insignia
- Issued by: United States Navy
- Type: Enlisted rating
- Abbreviation: SW
- Specialty: Construction

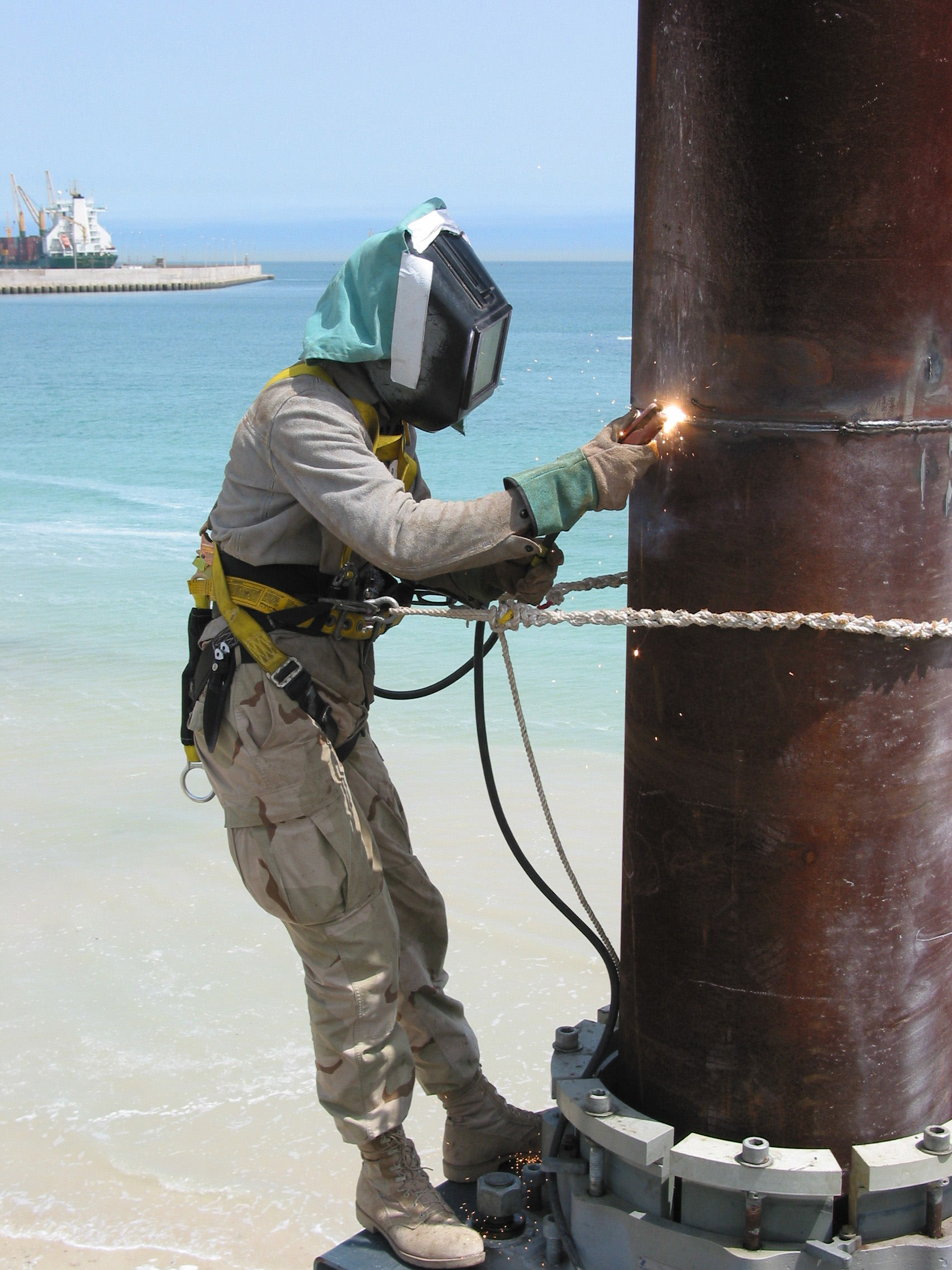
A United States Navy Steelworker welding a seam

Steelworker (abbreviated as SW) is a United States Navy occupational rating.

Steelworkers perform tasks directly related to fabrication and erection of pre-engineered structures, including steel reinforcement; control job site deployment of materials and equipment; direct and coordinate the composition, training and efforts of crews who fabricate, assemble, erect, position and join structural members and fabricated sections; maintain individual combat readiness and perform tasks required in combat and disaster preparedness or recovery operations.

At the senior chief petty officer level, the Steelworker rating merges with the Builder and Engineering Aide ratings. At this level, they are referred to as a Senior Chief Constructionman (CUCS).

At the master chief petty officer level, they merge with all other construction ratings as a master chief seabee (abbreviated as CBCM).

== See also ==
- List of United States Navy ratings
