= Prime Base Engineer Emergency Force =

U.S. Air Force Civil Engineer Support

A Prime Base Engineer Emergency Force is a rapidly deployable, specialized civil engineer unit of the United States Air Force. Prime BEEFs provide a full range of engineering support required to establish, operate, and maintain garrison and contingency airbases.

== Overview ==
The primary mission of Prime BEEF is to provide civil engineer support for the beddown of personnel and aircraft. Prime BEEF capabilities include airbase site surveys, establishing bare base camps and operations and utility system installation. Since Prime BEEF forces specialize in airfield operations, they are the primary units considered when establishing and sustaining airfield operations at locations where U.S. Air Force aircraft operate.

Prime BEEF forces have the necessary command, control and communications to support beddown; fire emergency services; emergency management; explosive ordnance disposal; expedient construction; explosive incident response; chemical, biological, radiological and nuclear response and other specialized teams that provide unique engineering capabilities.

Prime BEEF teams are also called on to support recovery operations after a natural or man-made disaster to assess damage, fight fires, mitigate hazards, provide emergency utilities, beddown military forces and disaster victims, repair facility damage, and control and monitor contamination.

Although Prime BEEF units are rapidly deployable and capable of providing support anywhere in the world on short notice, they are typically assigned to an installation. Therefore, when operations require heavy construction support, the U.S. Air Force employs the capabilities of RED HORSE (Rapid Engineer Deployable Heavy Operational Repair Squadron Engineers) units.

After the September 11, 2001 attacks, Prime BEEF teams were the first U.S. Air Force Civil Engineers deployed across the Southwest Asia area of responsibility to support Operation Enduring Freedom in Afghanistan, and then, Operation Iraqi Freedom in Iraq.

== History ==
The Lebanon Crisis of 1958, the Berlin Crisis of 1961, and the Cuban Missile Crisis of 1962 demonstrated a need for the capability to respond to worldwide emergencies. Aircraft and support personnel were being deployed without providing runways, water supply, electricity, housing, and other facilities necessary to support them. Civil engineering personnel, who could rapidly respond, were needed to accompany aircraft and to provide basing facilities. The U.S. Air Force's answer was the Prime BEEF program.

The Air Force established the Prime BEEF program in 1964, posturing civil engineers to better respond to worldwide contingencies. Military civil engineers were divided into specially trained and equipped mobility and recovery teams, each with their own unit type code identifier. The first Prime BEEF deployment went to San Isidro Air Base, Dominican Republic to support the airlift moving U.S. Army forces into the area in May 1965.

That same year the Air Force deployed dozens of separate teams as the buildup of forces in Southeast Asia began, base civil engineering forces were inundated with construction, operations, and maintenance requirements. Large numbers of U.S. Air Force strike aircraft were sent to bases where pavement for aircraft parking was at a premium. Aircraft were parked wing tip to wing tip, vulnerable to an accidental explosion or enemy attack. A need for aircraft revetments was dramatically brought home on 15 May 1965 when the explosion of a bomb under the wing of a loaded B-57 aircraft set off a chain reaction of explosions on the parking apron at Bien Hoa Air Base, South Vietnam. Forty aircraft were destroyed, 26 Americans killed, and over 60 wounded.

Three 25-man Prime BEEF teams were organized from Air Training Command, Strategic Air Command, and Air Defense Command. Teams were deployed to Tan Son Nhut, Bien Hoa and Da Nang Air Bases (all in South Vietnam) to construct aircraft revetments and complete whatever work that was needed. During their 120-day deployments, the teams constructed over 12,000 feet (3,700 m) of revetments, parking aprons, and several miles of roads. The revetments paid for themselves in saved aircraft in just the first six months.

Soon other specialized teams were deployed to bases in Vietnam and Thailand to perform short-term construction projects. A Prime BEEF team was sent to Tan Son Nhut to ensure the rapidly growing base had an adequate water supply. Prime BEEF III sent teams to several other bases to build housing. The teams erected "hootches," framed tents, and constructed over 34,000 square feet (3,200 m^{2}) of support facilities at six bases in South Vietnam.

Prime BEEF teams continued to perform critical repair and construction work in Southeast Asia. Between 1965 and 1972, nearly 2,000 Prime BEEF team members were deployed to Southeast Asia to construct vital petroleum, oil, and lubricant (POL) pipelines and storage facilities; install jet engine exhaust blast deflectors; provide electrical power to buildings; and to erect small buildings.

The Prime BEEF program proved its value in additional situations. Several hundred personnel were deployed to Korea during Operation Combat Fox, following the seizure of the USS Pueblo in 1968. These teams dug wells, laid airfield matting, erected frame buildings, installed aircraft arresting systems, sandbagged bunkers, and rehabilitated building and utility systems to facilitate the buildup of American forces at Korean air bases.

As the Vietnam War began to wind down, Prime BEEF teams remained in great demand by the U.S. Air Force. A number of these teams completed civic action projects in the Trust Territories of the Pacific Islands (which became the Federated States of Micronesia). In 1969, firefighters, now a part of the Prime BEEF program, were sent to locations around the world to provide fire protection and crash/rescue support. Teams also provided civil engineering support for various research projects. For example, they supported a project of the Air Force Weapons Laboratory testing on Eniwetok Atoll in 1972.

Two weeks following the 9/11 attacks members of the 27th Civil Engineer Squadron Prime BEEF team from Cannon AFB New Mexico deployed to a forward location in the AOR and built a tent city and million gallon jet fuel farm at a (then) Classified location. They would not return till March 2002.

In Afghanistan, 2013

Training

Afghanistan, 2014

Exercise at Yokota Air Base, Japan, 2026

577th EPBS emblem

== See also ==
- Air Force Civil Engineer Support Agency
- Combat engineer
- Military engineering of the United States
- Rapid Engineer Deployable Heavy Operational Repair Squadron Engineers
- Sapper
- Seabees
- United States Army Corps of Engineers
