= Engineering aide =

Seabee occupational rating in the U.S. Navy

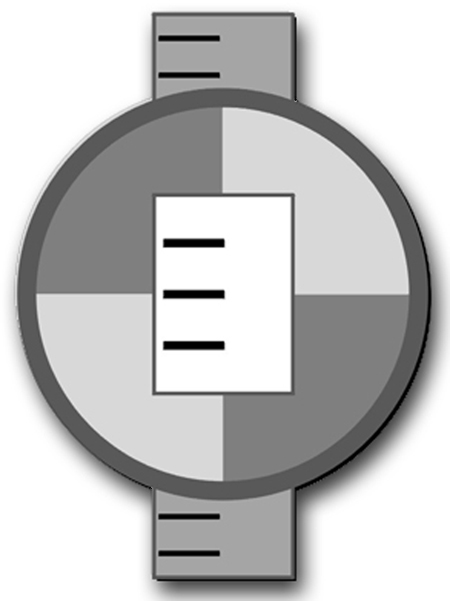
- Rating insignia
- Issued by: United States Navy
- Type: Enlisted rating
- Abbreviation: EA
- Specialty: Construction

Engineering aide (abbreviated as EA) is a United States Navy occupational rating.

Engineering aides plan, supervise and perform tasks required in construction surveying, construction drafting, planning and estimating and quality control; prepare progress reports, time records, construction schedules and material and labor estimates; establish/operate a basic quality control system for testing soils, concrete and bituminous materials; prepare, edit and reproduce construction drawings; make control surveys, performing such tasks as running and closing traverses, surveying for excavations and obtaining and converting field notes into topographic maps; maintain individual combat readiness and perform tasks required in combat and disaster preparedness or recovery operations.

The engineering aide's rating insignia shows a Philadelphia rod, and alludes to the rating's original job, which was conducting surveys.

At the senior chief petty officer level, the engineering aide rating merges with the builder and steelworker ratings. At this level, they are referred to as a senior chief constructionman (abbreviated CUCS).

At the master chief petty officer level, they merge with all other construction ratings as a master chief seabee (abbreviated as CBCM).

== See also ==
- List of United States Navy ratings
