= 203d RED HORSE Squadron =

- Active: 1985 – present
- Country: United States
- Allegiance: Air National Guard
- Branch: United States Air Force
- Garrison/HQ: State Military Reservation (SMR), Virginia
- Motto(s): "Lead, Follow, or get the hell out of the way!"

Commanders
- Current commander: Lt. Col Abisaab

The United States Air Force's 203d RED HORSE squadron is an Air National Guard unit located at State Military Reservation, Virginia. RED HORSE is an acronym formed from "Rapid Engineer Deployable Heavy Operational Repair Squadron Engineers"

- 1985, the Air National Guard activated 203d RED HORSE Squadron at Camp Pendleton, Virginia.
- 2001, March 3rd, a C-23 Sherpa carrying 18 Red Horse members and 3 Florida National Guardsmen crashed in Georgia, killing all onboard.

== Mission ==
- To provide highly mobile, rapidly deployable civil engineering response force self-sufficient for worldwide deployment.

== Major Command/Gaining Command ==
Major Command (MAJCOM), Air Combat Command (ACC), headquartered in Langly Air Force base, Virginia.

== Bases stationed ==
- Camp Pendleton, Virginia (1985 – 2023)
- State Military Reservation, Virginia 2023 - Present

== Weapons Systems Operated ==
- (No weapons systems operated other than typical personal weapons, M16 rifle, M60 machine gun, M9 pistol, M203 grenade launcher.

This is because this unit is an engineering construction unit, like a civilian construction company, with all of the trades in the unit. Building all types of horizontal and vertical construction, including underground utilities. )
