= Rapid Engineer Deployable Heavy Operational Repair Squadron Engineers =

Heavy construction units of the United States Air Force

RED HORSE
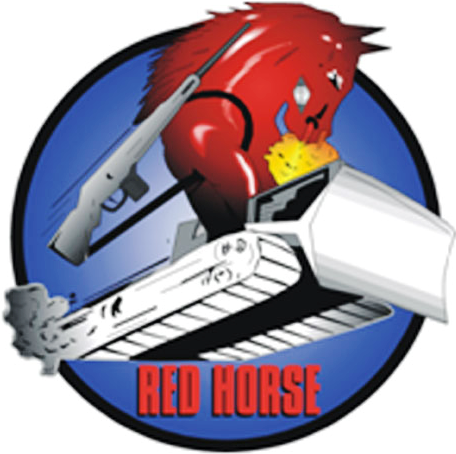
- RED HORSE emblem
- Active: 1965-present
- Country: United States
- Branch: United States Air Force
- Role: Combat Engineering

Insignia
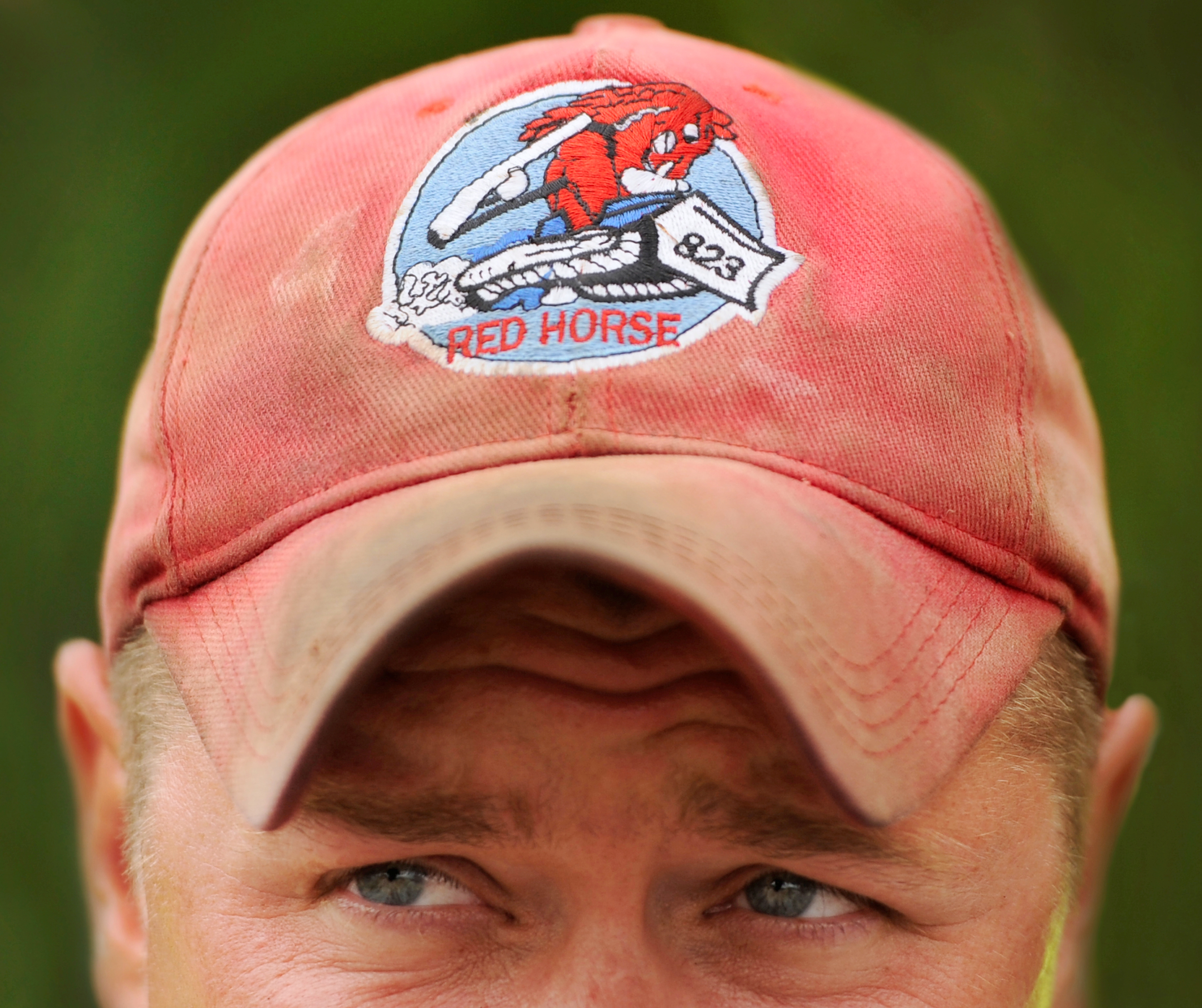
- Red ball cap worn by RED HORSE units with RED HORSE emblem imprinted with the unit's designation on the dozer blade

Rapid Engineer Deployable Heavy Operational Repair Squadron Engineer (RED HORSE) squadrons are the United States Air Force's heavy-construction units. Their combat engineering capabilities are similar to those of the U.S. Navy Seabees and U.S. Army heavy-construction organizations.

US Air Force Red Horse Engineers work to restore Tinian airfields to bolster future pacific theater operations (2024)

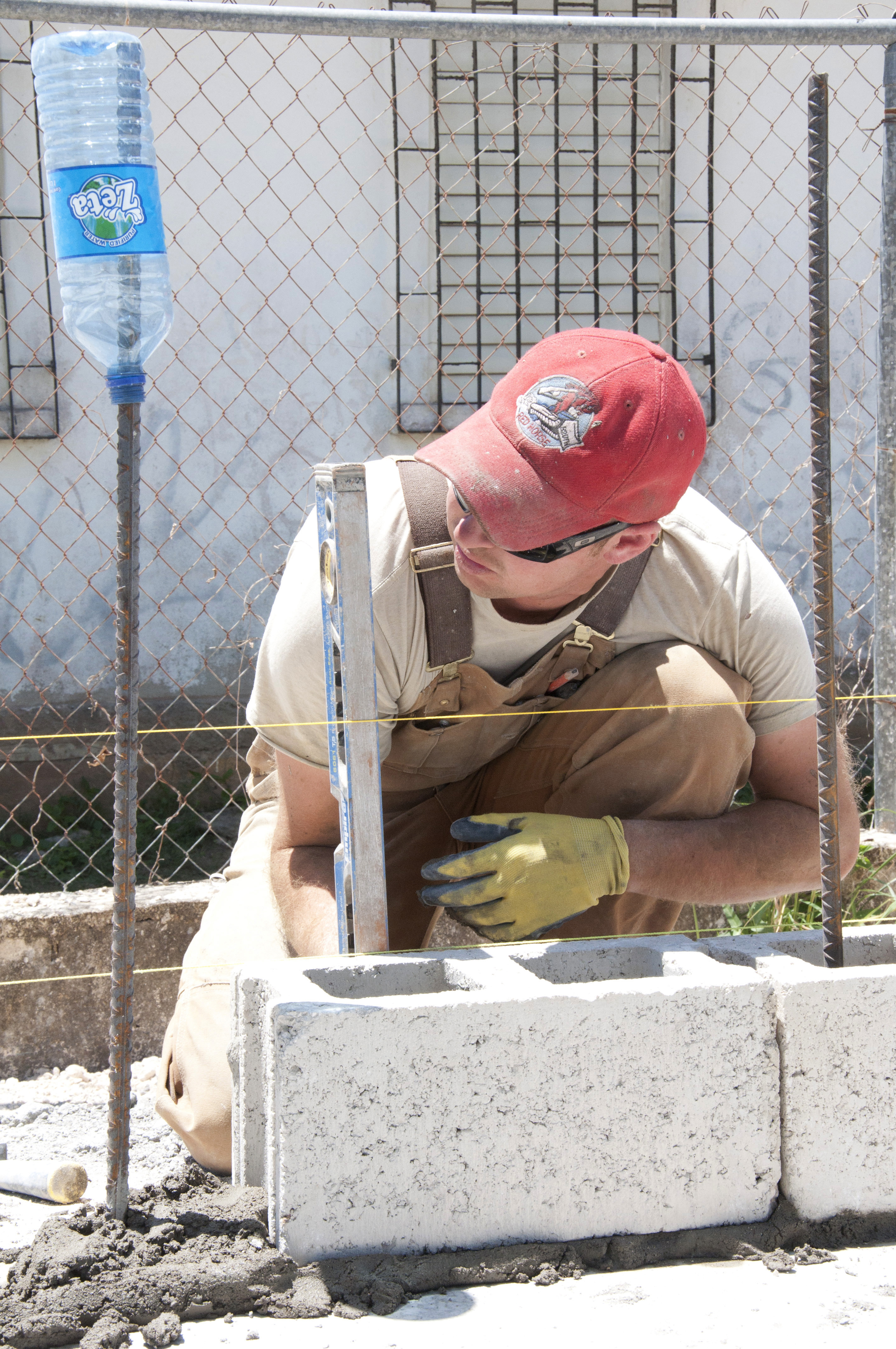
An airman with the 820th RED HORSE Squadron ensures a block is level at a high school construction site in Belize, 2014

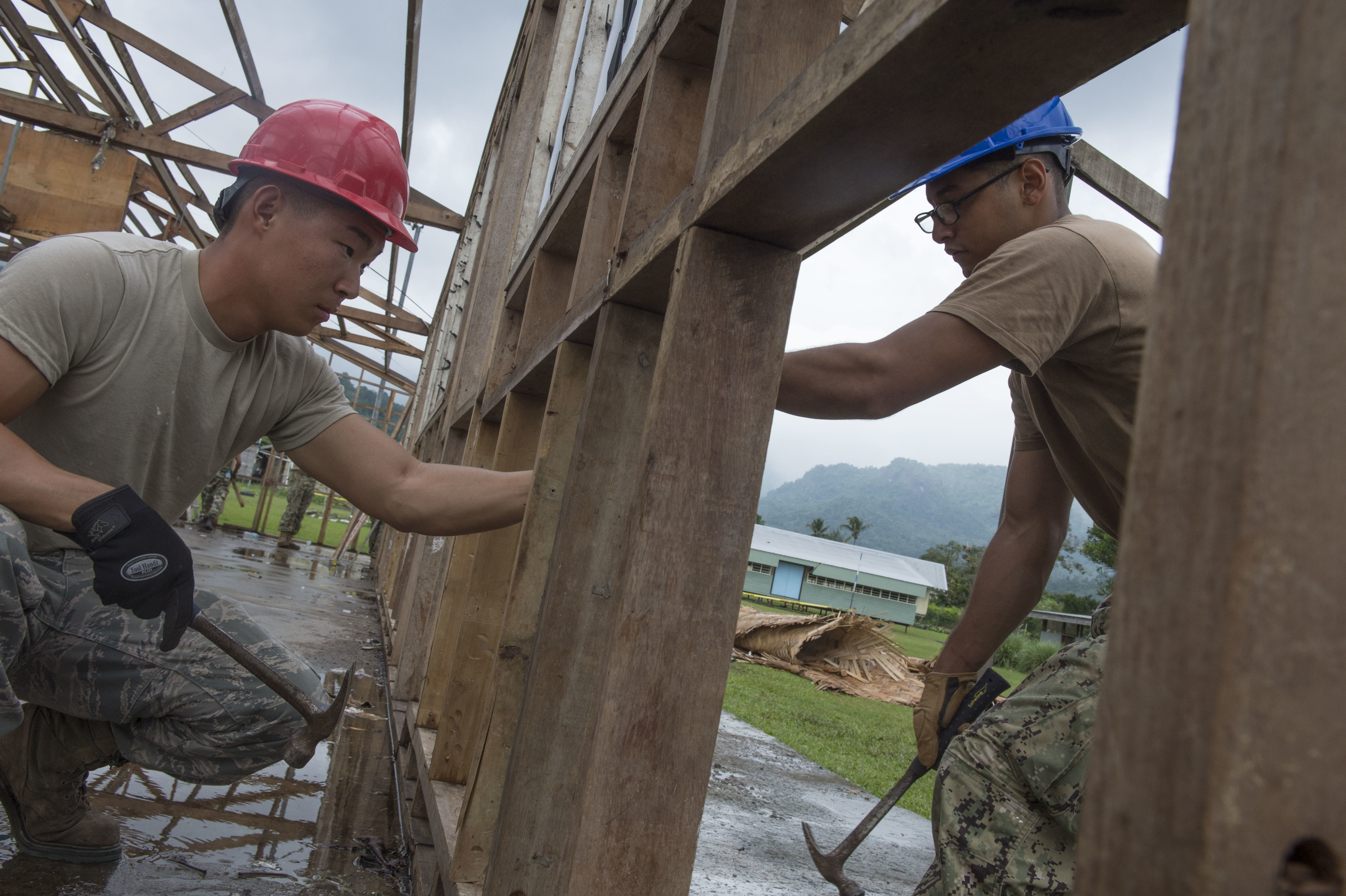
A RED HORSE airman (left) and a Seabee construct building frames at a primary school as part of a joint military construction team supporting Pacific Partnership 2015

Air Force paratroopers with the 820th Red Horse Squadron, Airborne Flight conduct airborne insertion training at Nellis Air Force Base, Nevada, 2012

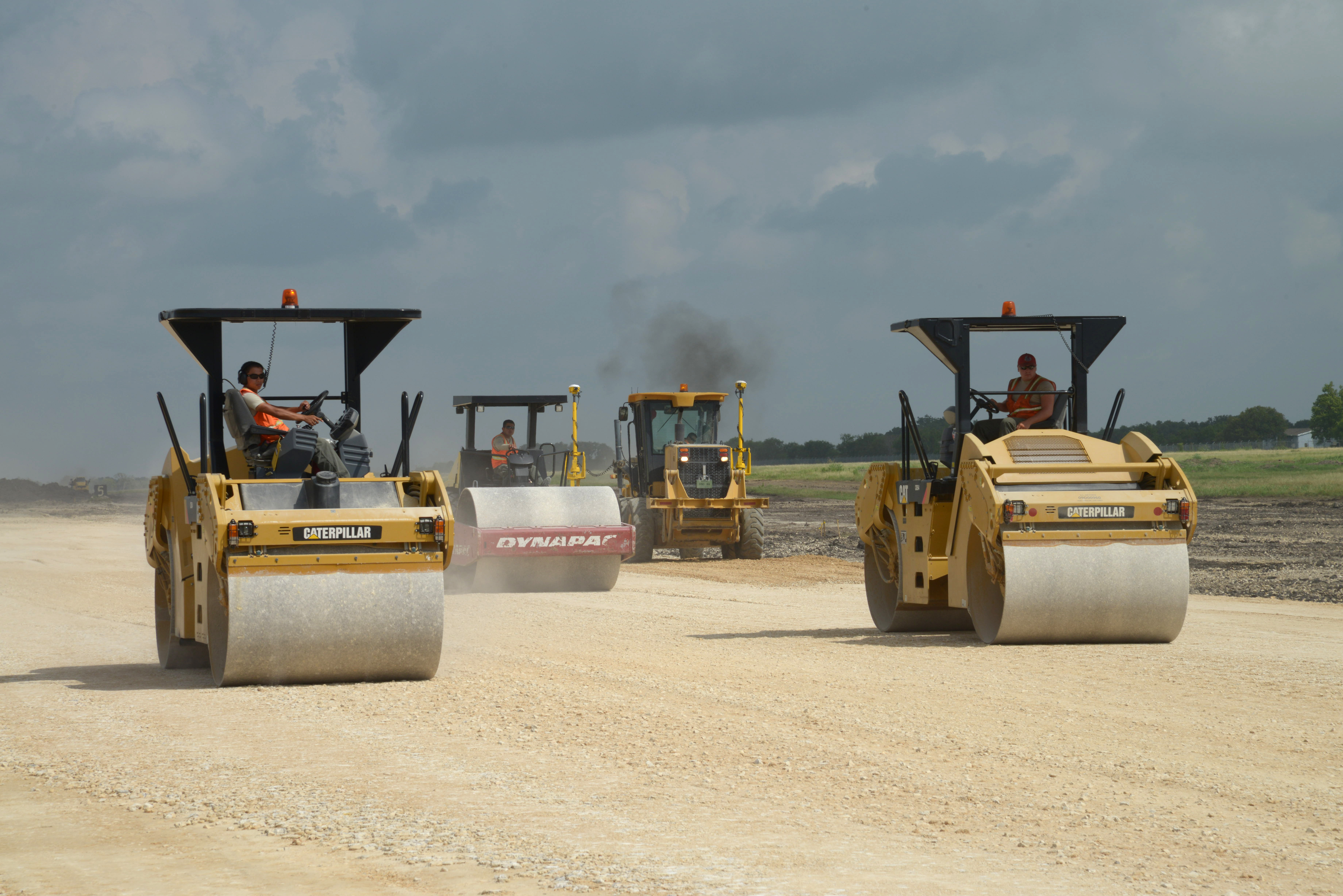
Heavy equipment operators from the 820th RED HORSE Squadron operate vibratory rollers to compact material under the runway at Seguin Auxiliary Airfield, Joint Base San Antonio, Texas, 2014

== About ==
During the Vietnam War, Air Force "Prime BEEF" ("PRIMary Base Engineer Emergency Force") teams filled a need for short-term construction capabilities. However, the Air Force needed a stable and longer-term heavy-repair capability. The response was to organize two, 400-man (12 officers and 388 airmen) heavy-repair squadrons. RED HORSE units activated in 1966 when Secretary of Defense Robert McNamara asked the Air Force to develop its own combat construction team.

RED HORSE squadrons provide the Air Force with a highly mobile civil engineering response force to support contingency and special operations worldwide. Units are self-sufficient, 404-person mobile squadrons, capable of rapid response and independent operations in remote, high-threat environments worldwide. They provide heavy-repair capability and construction support when requirements exceed normal base civil engineer (Prime BEEF) capabilities and where U.S. Army engineer support is not readily available.

RED HORSE units possess personal and crew-served weapons, vehicles, equipment and vehicle maintenance, food service, emergency management (to include CBRN passive defense and Counter-WMD operations), comptroller, contracting, supply and medical equipment and personnel.

RED HORSE's major wartime responsibility is to provide a highly mobile, rapidly deployable, civil engineering response force that is self-sufficient to perform heavy damage repair required for recovery of critical Air Force facilities and utility systems, and aircraft launch and recovery. In addition, it accomplishes engineer support for beddown of weapon systems required to initiate and sustain operations in an austere bare-base environment, including remote hostile locations, or locations in a chemical, biological, radiological, and nuclear (CBRN) -prone environment.

The primary RED HORSE tasking in peacetime is to train for contingency and wartime operations. It participates regularly in Joint Chiefs of Staff and major command exercises, military operations other than war, and civic action programs. RED HORSE performs training projects that assist base construction efforts while, at the same time, honing wartime skills. Air Force RED HORSE units possess special capabilities, such as water-well drilling, explosive demolition, aircraft arresting system installation, quarry operations, concrete mobile operations, material testing, expedient facility erection, and concrete and asphalt paving.

To support the "Open the Airbase" mission, RED HORSE added an Airborne capability in 2003. With this capability, RED HORSE can rapidly deliver small specialized teams and equipment packages by airdrop or air insertion to conduct expedient airfield repairs. Initially, the only RED HORSE unit to have air-inserted troops was the 823rd RED HORSE, in April 2003 at Baghdad International Airport, however, the 554th established an Airborne capability known as the 554th RHS Assault, Assessment, and Repair Operations (AARO, pronounced "arrow") team to provide an Airborne-inserted rapid airfield seizure and repair capability for the Pacific theater.

== Units ==
There are five active-duty, four Air Force Reserve Command, and five Air National Guard RED HORSE squadrons:

- 513th RED HORSE Squadron, Andersen Air Force Base, Guam
- 554th RED HORSE Squadron, Andersen Air Force Base, Guam
- 819th RED HORSE Squadron, Malmstrom Air Force Base, Montana
- 820th RED HORSE Squadron, Nellis Air Force Base, Nevada
- 823rd RED HORSE Squadron, Hurlburt Field, Florida
  - Detachment 1, Tyndall AFB, Florida Also known as the Silver Flag Exercise Site. The squadron's 84-person cadre provides contingency combat support training to Active Duty, Air Force Reserve Command, Air National Guard, Active Component and Reserve Component Army, Marine Corps, and Navy, and allied nations mission support group personnel. More than 6,000 people are trained each year at the site.

On 26 April 2022, the 823rd RED HORSE Squadron Detachment 1 was inactivated and replaced by the 801st RED HORSE Training Squadron.

The 1st Expeditionary RED HORSE Group (inactivated) was in the USCENTCOM area of responsibility (AOR). The 557th Expeditionary RED HORSE Squadron is now located in the USCENTCOM AOR, and is part of the 1st Expeditionary Civil Engineering Group that also consists of one Prime BEEF Squadrons and one RED HORSE Squadron.

Air Force Reserve:

- 307th RED HORSE Squadron, Barksdale Air Force Base, Louisiana (inactivated Aug 2015)
- 555th RED HORSE Squadron, Nellis Air Force Base, Nevada (classic association with 820th RHS)
- 556th RED HORSE Squadron, Hurlburt Field, Florida (classic association with 823rd RHS)
- 560th RED HORSE Squadron, Charleston Air Force Base, South Carolina (active association with 628th Civil Engineer Squadron)
- 567th RED HORSE Squadron, Seymour Johnson Air Force Base, North Carolina (active association with 94th Civil Engineer Squadron)
- 583rd RED HORSE Squadron, Beale Air Force Base, California (inactivated Sep 2015; re-flagged as 940 CES)

Air National Guard:

- 200th RED HORSE Squadron, Camp Perry near Port Clinton, Ohio
  - Detachment, Mansfield, Ohio
- 201st RED HORSE Squadron, Fort Indiantown Gap, Pennsylvania
  - Detachment 1, Willow Grove, Pennsylvania
- 202nd RED HORSE Squadron, Camp Blanding, Florida (combines with the 203d RHF to form a full squadron)
- 203rd RED HORSE Squadron, Camp Pendleton, Virginia (combines with the 202nd RHS to form a full squadron)
- 210th RED HORSE Squadron, Kirtland Air Force Base, New Mexico under the HQ New Mexico Air National Guard
- 219th RED HORSE Squadron, Malmstrom Air Force Base, Montana (associate unit to the 819th RHS)
- 254th RED HORSE Squadron, Andersen Air Force Base, Guam (associate unit to the 554th RHS)
- 254th RED HORSE Flight, Camp Murray, Washington

The Air National Guard squadrons are split units with separate commanders. When mobilized (excluding the 219th and 254th), these units come together as one squadron.

== See also ==
- Military engineer
- Military engineering of the United States
- United States Army Corps of Engineers
- United States Navy Seabees
