= 325th Air Control Squadron =

United States Air Force military unit

325th Air Control Squadron
- Active: 1943–1944; 1983–2012
- Country: United States
- Branch: United States Air Force
- Type: Command and Control
- Part of: Air Education and Training Command
- Garrison/HQ: Tyndall Air Force Base
- Nickname: Screamin' Eagles
- Engagements: Mediterranean Theater of Operations
- Decorations: Air Force Outstanding Unit Award

Insignia
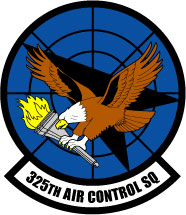
- 325th Air Control Squadron emblem (approved 18 May 1999)

The 325th Air Control Squadron was a part of the 325th Fighter Wing, based at the United States Air Force's Tyndall Air Force Base, Florida. Originally constituted the 325th Fighter Control Squadron in March 1943, the 325th served in the Mediterranean Theatre of Operations during WWII. During the past decades, radar operations and maintenance has been taught to tens of thousands of personnel of all ranks. Following the transfer of the 325th Fighter Wing to Air Combat Command, on 12 October 2012 the 325th Air Control Squadron was replaced by the 337th Air Control Squadron under the 33rd Fighter Wing at Eglin Air Force Base.

== Mission ==
The 325th was primarily responsible for the initial training of all Active duty, Air National Guard, and Reserve Air Force Air Battle Manager officers in command and control mission execution. The squadron provided training international officers in command and control operations, as well as command and control support for F-22A Raptor initial and transition training at Tyndall AFB.

== History ==
=== World War II ===
The "Screamin' Eagles" began as the 325th Fighter Control Squadron in April 1943. In December 1943, the unit moved to North Africa to support the operations of the American and other Allied flying units. Moving its radar with the front lines, the squadron saw action throughout the Mediterranean and Southern Europe and earned battle streamers for Rome, 1944; Southern France, 1944; and the Rhineland, 1945. The squadron was disbanded in early 1945, when German air activity had effectively ceased.

=== Controller training ===
The 325th Tactical Training Squadron was activated in October 1983 and overtime absorbed the controller training mission conducted at Tyndall Air Force Base. After being renamed the 325th Training Squadron in November 1991 the two squadrons were consolidated in June 1999. In 2001 the squadron was redesignated as the 325th Air Control Squadron.

In addition to the F-22, the squadron also assisted with the training of McDonnell Douglas F-15 Eagle pilots until their departure from Tyndall in 2010.

The squadron instructed five comprehensive courses. The primary course was the nine-month Undergraduate Air Battle Manager Training course, where officers learned everything from radar theory to large force employment. Graduates of this course receive follow-on assignments to the combat Air Forces to perform air battle management on the Boeing E-3 Sentry or the Boeing E-8 Joint STARS aircraft. Additional courses include the Battle Manager Instructor Training Course, which teaches air battle managers from different backgrounds the skills necessary to instruct undergraduate students, and the Air Weapons Officer/Weapons Director Initial Qualification Training Course, which teaches previously qualified air battle managers and weapons directors the art and science of controlling live aircraft. The 325th ACS also conducts the International Air Weapons Controller Course and the Theater Air Operations Course, where officers from around the world are introduced to weapons control and theater air operations.

== Lineage ==
325th Fighter Control Squadron

- Constituted as the 325th Fighter Control Squadron on 31 March 1943

Activated on 1 April 1943
Disbanded on 31 December 1944

- Reconstituted and consolidated with the 325th Training Squadron as the 325th Training Squadron on 15 June 1999

325th Air Control Squadron

- Constituted as the 325th Tactical Training Squadron on 14 October 1983

Activated on 15 October 1983
Redesignated 325th Training Squadron on 1 November 1991
Consolidated with the 325th Fighter Control Squadron on 15 June 1999
Redesignated 325th Air Control Squadron on 7 September 2001
Inactivated 12 October 2012

=== Assignments ===
- I Fighter Command, 1 April 1943
- Twelfth Air Force, c. 15 December 1943
- XII Fighter Command, 18 Dec 1943
- 63d Fighter Wing, c. 13 May 1944 (Under operational control of No. 210 Group RAF September-October 1944)
- 560th Signal Aircraft Warning Battalion, 10 November–31 December 1944
- 325th Tactical Training Wing, 15 October 1983
- 325th Operations Group, 1 September 1991 – 12 October 2012

=== Stations ===
- Bradley Field, Connecticut, 1 April 1943
- Suffolk County Army Air Field, New York, 12 August–30 November 1943
- Casablanca, French Morocco, 15 December 1943
- Nouvion Airfield, Algeria, 23 January 1944
- Alghero, Sardinia, Italy, 13 May 1944
- Calvi, Corsica, June 1944
- St. Tropez, France, 1 September 1944
- Lamanon, France, c. 18 September 1944
- Pisa, Italy, 20 October 1944
- San Petro, Italy, December–31 December 1944
- Tyndall Air Force Base, Florida, 15 October 1983 – 12 October 2012
