= 325th =

325th may refer to:

- 325th Air Division, an inactive United States Air Force unit
- 325th Division (Vietnam), a division of the People's Army of Vietnam
- 325th Fighter-Interceptor Squadron, an inactive United States Air Force unit
- 325th Fighter Wing, a wing of the United States Air Force
  - 325th Air Control Squadron, former part of the 325th Fighter Wing
- 325th Infantry Division (Wehrmacht), infantry division of the German Heer, formed in March 1945 as one of the Wehrmacht's final emergency formations of the war
- 325th Infantry Regiment (United States), a light infantry parachute insertion fighting force of the United States Army
- 325th Weapons Squadron, a United States Air Force unit assigned to the USAF Weapons School

== See also ==
- 325 (number)
- 325, the year 325 (CCCXXV) of the Julian calendar
