= 475th =

475th may refer to:

- 475th Air Base Wing, inactive United States Air Force unit
- 475th Bombardment Squadron, inactive United States Air Force unit
- 475th Fighter Group, World War II predecessor of 53d Weapons Evaluation Group
- 475th Test Squadron, inactive United States Air Force unit

== See also ==
- 475 (number)
- 475, the year 475 (CDLXXV) of the Julian calendar
- 475 BC
