= U.S. Air Force Emergency Management =

United States Air Force organisation

U.S. Air Force Emergency Management is the United States Air Force's (USAF) primary organization responsible for implementing an installation-level EM program. Emergency managers, also known by the Air Force Specialty Code (AFSC) 3E9X1, are the Air Force's subject matter experts for all non-medical chemical, biological, radiological and nuclear (CBRN) passive defense and consequence management matters.

During wartime operations, 3E9X1s are assigned to CBRN reconnaissance teams responsible for detecting, identifying, quantifying, and collecting CBRN material ensuring mission continuation and force survivability.

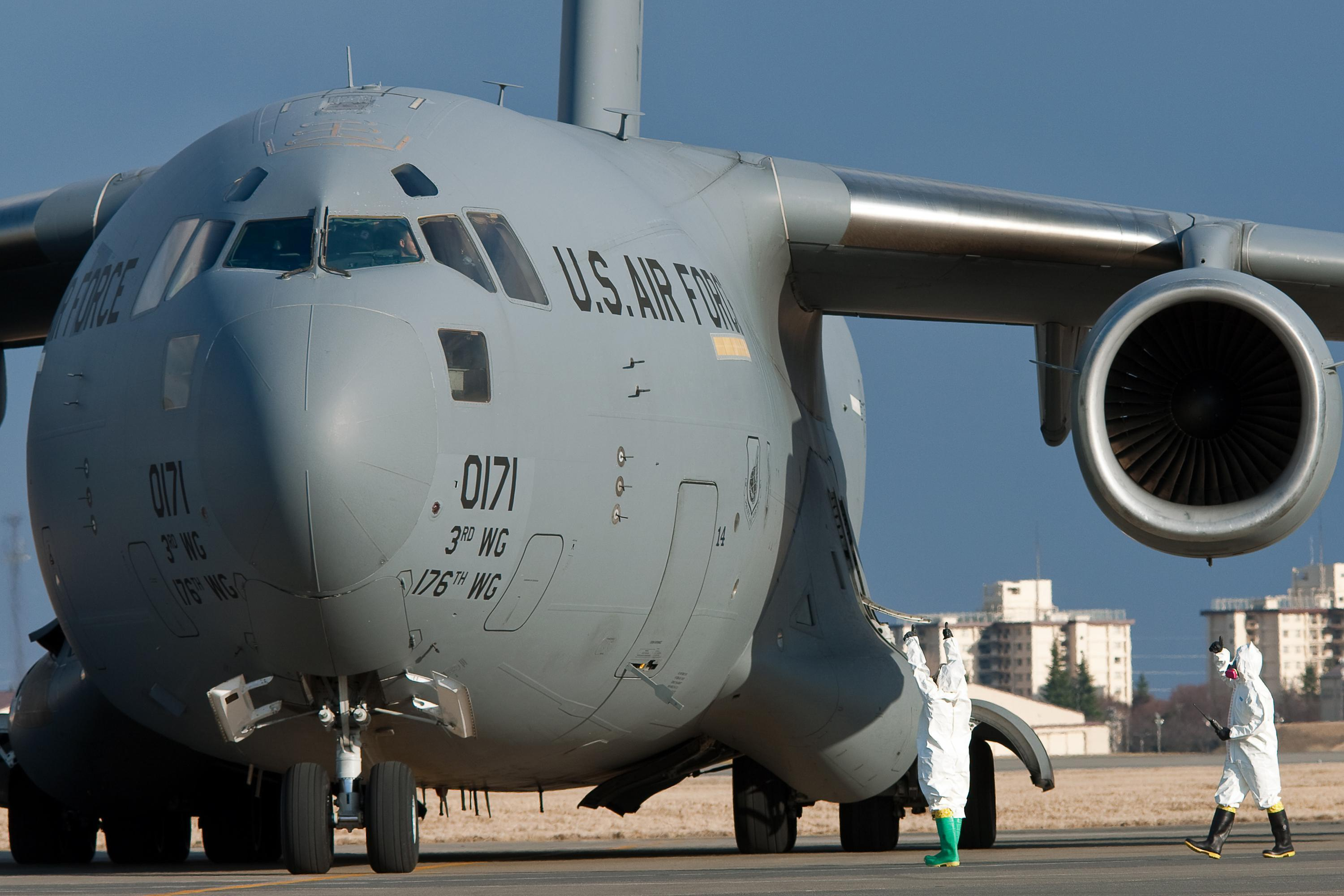
Emergency Managers check a C-17 for contamination.

== Responsibilities ==
- Prepares, reviews and provides input to installation contingency plans and supporting documents for mobility, response, and recovery operations.
- Serves as emergency operations center (EOC) manager during disasters, transmitting important information about the base's condition and details about the base's mission capability.
- Monitors prime base engineer emergency force (Prime BEEF), air base operability, hazardous materials emergency response, and disaster preparedness programs, and conducts and schedules associated training. The Be Ready campaign is an example of a disaster preparedness campaign and provides the tools needed to properly prepare for disasters.
- Routinely manages training exercises composing of disaster scenarios ranging from enemy attack involving a CBRN threat to natural disasters.
- Trains the base on use of CBRN PPE as well as setting up parts of the TDG (threat detection grid).
- Conducts CBRN Reconnaissance and Surveillance and CBRN Warning, and Reporting activities.
- Prepares for, Responds to, and Recovers from all-hazards, including the use of Weapons of Mass Destruction.

== Occupational badge heraldry ==
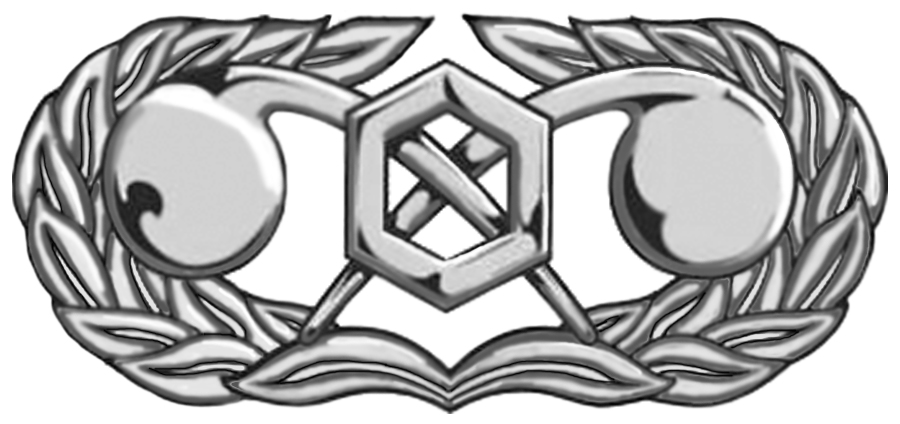
Basic EM Occupational Badge, awarded after completion of technical training.

The Readiness Occupational Badge was introduced by the CSAF in February 2006 with an official wear date of 1 October 06. The badge uses the Air Force wreaths combined with basic insignia first adopted by the U.S. Army Chemical Service in 1917: two crossed retorts—glass laboratory vessels used for distilling, which has been in use for hundreds of years—placed behind a benzene ring, the molecular building block of many organic chemicals. The benzene ring signifies the molecular composition of the chemical benzene. It has six points for each atom of carbon and hydrogen, representing the basic elements of chemistry. These elements of design allude to their chemical-related functions and deeply rooted history in the U.S. Army AirCorps to today’s Air Force. There are three different types of the occupational badge, which consist of basic, senior, and master. Time in position and expertise in the career field is what distinguishes the difference between them.

== Technical training ==
Training for Emergency Managers starts at the United States Army CBRN School at Fort Leonard Wood, Missouri, which trains US CBRN forces from all branches of the United States Department of Defense (DOD). The 368th Training Squadron / Detachment 1 operates the Emergency Management "schoolhouse" and instructs U.S. Air Force military, Civil Service and NATO students in a 67 academic day apprentice level prerequisite course. This is also followed by an 11 academic day CBRN Responder course conducted at the Lieutenant Joseph Terry CBRN Training Facility. When the student is sent to the CDTF (Chemical Defense Training Facility) during the last days of the course students will actually use their skills to assess the situation involving actual nerve agents. The CBRN Responder course certifies students to respond to CBRN/WMD incidents at the HAZMAT Technician level.

== Specialized training ==
The Defense Nuclear Weapons School provides Emergency Managers education and training specifically in radiological and nuclear weapons, nuclear and radiological incident command and control, incident response, and chemical, biological, radiological, and nuclear (CBRN) modeling.

Emergency Managers receive contingency skills training on a recurring basis to remain proficient on their wartime tasks through attending Silver Flag training.

Integrated Base Emergency Response Capability Training (IBERCT) is a workshop for CBRN, Hazmat responders, fire departments and emergency managers to train on best practices in a hands-on environment. MAJCOMs host these events to ensure their forces are prepared to the meet demands of a unified response operation.

The Emergency Management Institute (EMI) provides Emergency Managers the ability to perform essential work and skills in emergency operations during disasters. This is accomplished online through the Federal Emergency Management Agency's distance learning modules.

== Notable incidents ==
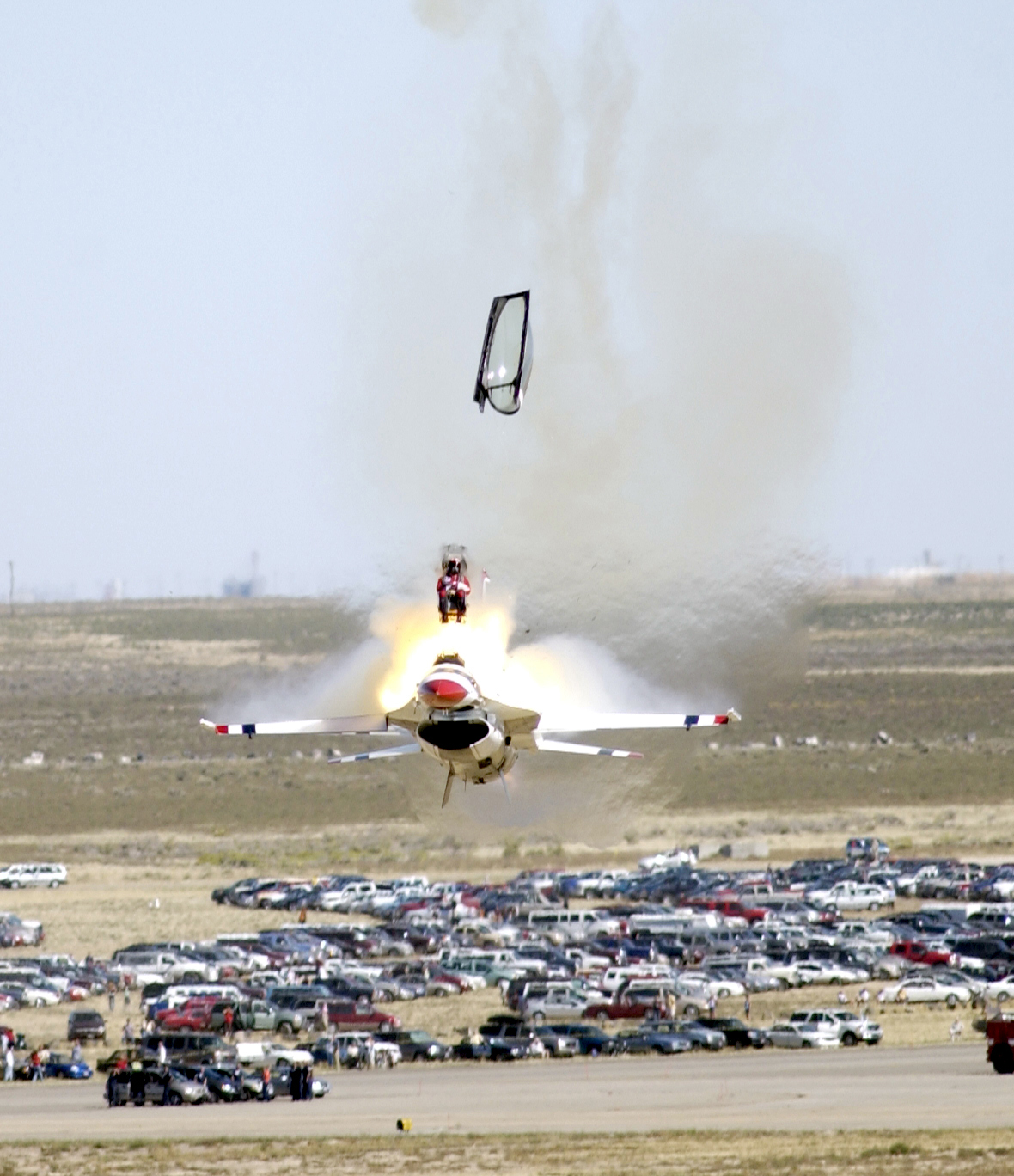
F-16 Crash during an Air Show at Mountain Home AFB, Idaho, in 2003

- Operation Tomodachi
- 2008 Andersen Air Force Base B-2 accident
- Hurricane Katrina
- Operation Iraqi Freedom
- Operation Enduring Freedom
- Hurricane Andrew
- Persian Gulf War
- 1980 Damascus, Arkansas incident
- 1968 Thule Air Base B-52 crash
