= 475th Test Squadron =

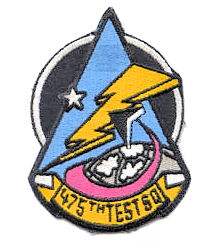
- 475th Test Squadron
- Active: 1 Jul 1981 – 15 Oct 1983
- Country: United States
- Branch: United States Air Force
- Type: Testing

The 475th Test Squadron is an inactive United States Air Force unit. It became active 1 July 1981. Its last assignment was with the Tactical Air Command 325th Fighter Wing stationed at Tyndall AFB, Florida. It was inactivated on 15 Oct 1983.

The squadron accomplished the operations, test and evaluation and maintenance portions of the complex United States Air Force Air Defense Weapons Center mission, which was directly related to combat readiness training for air defense. Primary aircraft were the F-106 Delta Dart and F-101 Voodoo.
