= 325th Fighter Wing =

325th Fighter Wing

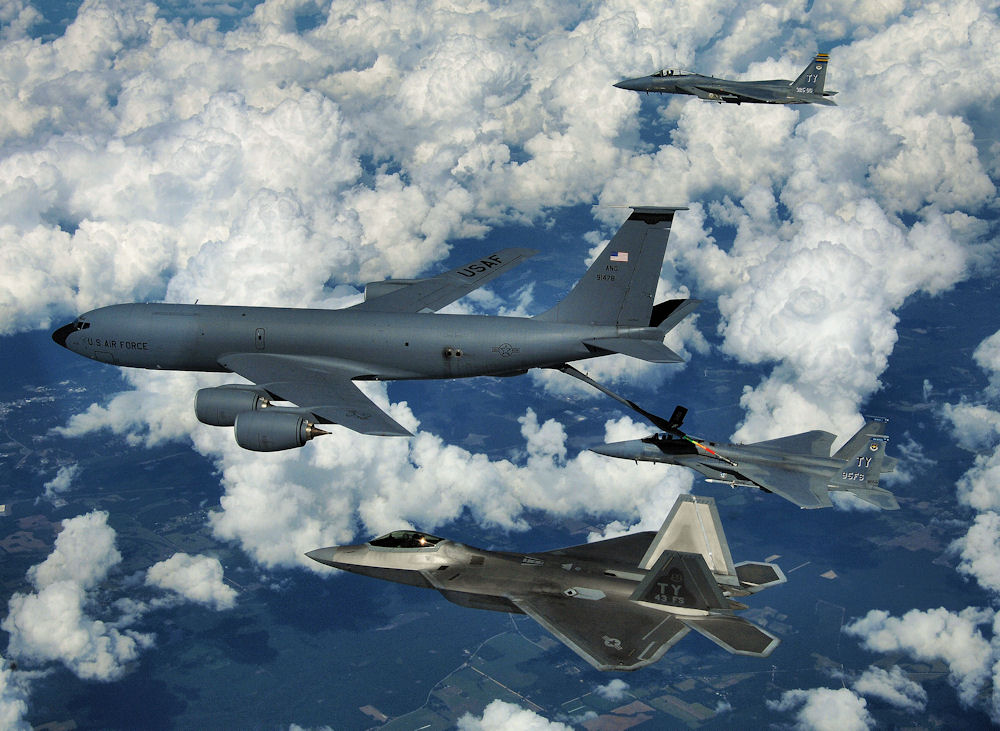
- An F-22 Raptor and two F-15 Eagles from Tyndall Air Force Base refuel from a KC-135 Stratotanker of the Mississippi Air National Guard over eastern Florida, 22 September 2008.
- Active: 1948–1952; 1956–1968; 1981–present
- Country: United States
- Branch: United States Air Force
- Size: Fighter
- Part of: Air Combat Command: Fifteenth Air Force
- Garrison/HQ: Tyndall Air Force Base
- Mottos: Locare et Liquidare (Latin for 'Locate and Liquidate')
- Decorations: Distinguished Unit Citation; Air Force Outstanding Unit Award

Commanders
- Current commander: Colonel Ryan C. Thulin
- Notable commanders: Richard Myers; Donavon F. Smith

Insignia
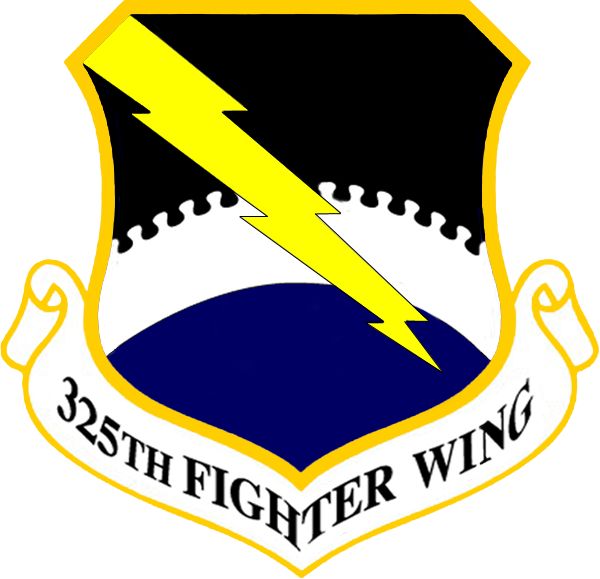
- 325th Fighter Wing emblem (Note: Approved 5 March 1957.)

The 325th Fighter Wing (325 FW) is a wing of the United States Air Force based in Tyndall Air Force Base, Florida.

== Mission ==
The 325th Fighter Wing's primary mission is to project combat airpower for the United States Air Force. The wing is currently transitioning to the F-35A Lightning II. When the transition is complete, the 325th Fighter Wing will become the Air Force's newest operational fighter wing with three F-35A squadrons tasked to maintain combat readiness in support of national defense.

The 325th FW is host to 20 tenant organizations from multiple Major Commands and across several military mission sets located at Tyndall Air Force Base, Fla. The wing comprises the 325th Operations Group, 325th Maintenance Group, 325th Mission Support Group and 325th Medical Group.

Tyndall Air Force Base is currently undergoing a $4.7 billion rebuild after sustaining a direct hit from Hurricane Michael in 2018. When the rebuild is complete, Tyndall will be the Air Force's first 21st Century “Installation of the Future.”

== Units ==
325th Operations Group (325 OG)
- 2d Fighter Training Squadron (2 FTS)
- 43d Fighter Squadron (43 FS)
- 95th Fighter Squadron (95 FS)
- 325th Operations Support Squadron (325 OSS)
- 325th Training Support Squadron (325 TRSS)

325th Maintenance Group (325 MXG)

- 95th Fighter Generation Squadron (95 FGS)
- 325th Maintenance Squadron (325 MXS)
- 325th Munitions Squadron (325 MUNS)

325th Mission Support Group (325 MSG)

- 325th Civil Engineer Squadron (325 CES)
- 325th Communications Squadron (325 CS)
- 325th Contracting Squadron (325 CONS)
- 325th Force Support Squadron (325 FSS)
- 325th Security Forces Squadron (325 SFS)
- 325th Logistics Readiness Squadron (325 LRS)

325th Medical Group (325 MDG)

- 325th Operational Medical Readiness Squadron (325 OMRS)
- 325th Medical Support Squadron (325 MDSS)

== History ==
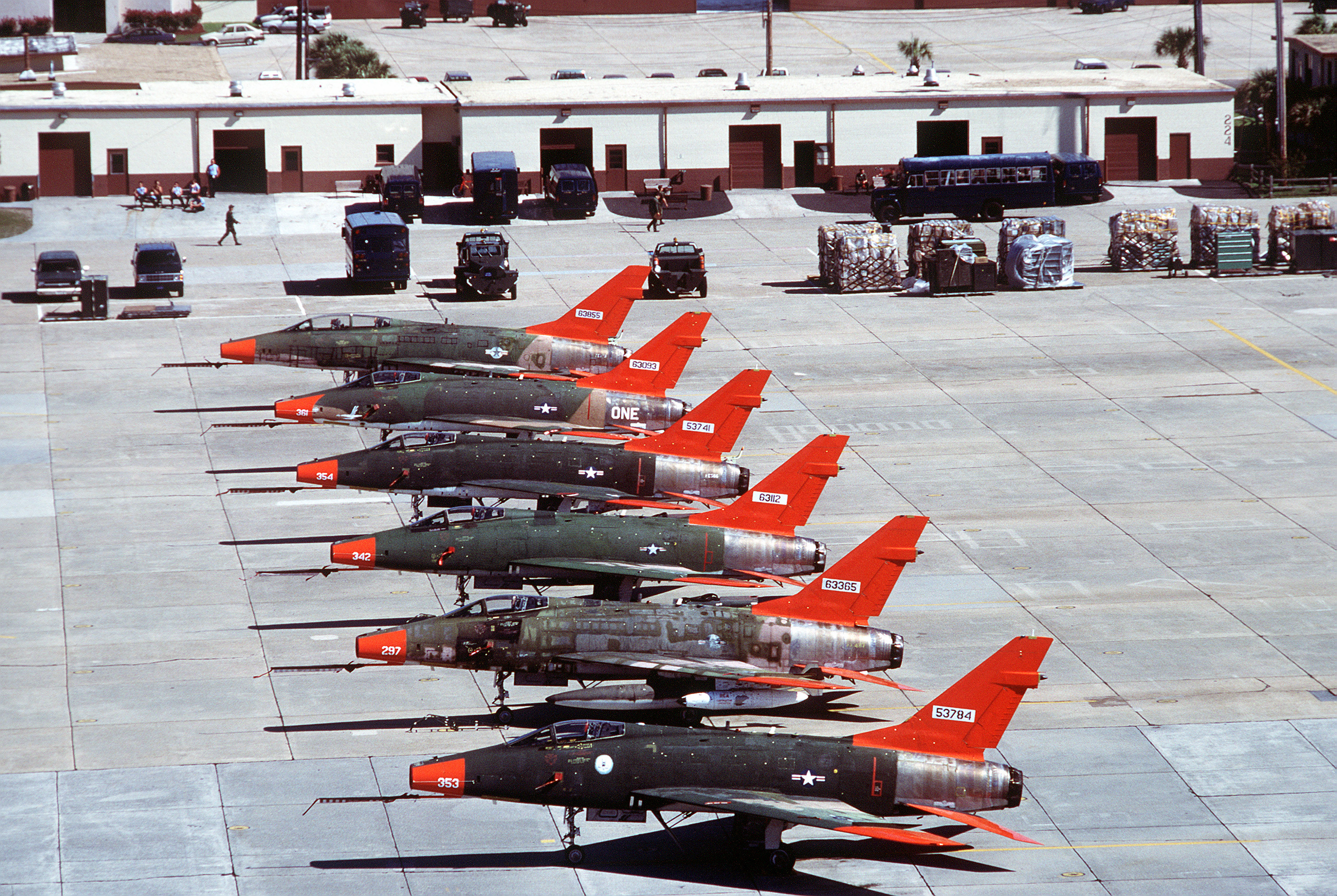
QF-100 Super Sabre target drones on the Tyndall AFB flight line

The 325th Fighter Wing was established on 10 May 1948 and activated on 9 June 1948. It conducted air defense of the U.S. west coast, 1948–1952 and 1956–1968. Beginning in spring 1949, the 325th conducted the All Weather Combat Crew Training School. During 1950, the wing also controlled a troop carrier squadron and from May 1950 to June 1951, provided training for elements of a troop carrier wing. On 6 February 1952 the Wing was inactivated and replaced by the 4704th Air Defense Wing, which assumed most of its operational role, while the 567th Air Base Group assumed its host base functions.

An Air Defense Command program to reactivate historic units named "Project Arrow" resulted in the reactivation of the 325th Fighter Group (Air Defense) on 18 August 1955. The 325th group assumed the mission, personnel and equipment of the 567th Air Defense Group. The 325th served as the "host" unit at McChord Air Force Base until October 1956. From February to July 1968, the wing operated an air defense detachment at Osan Air Base, South Korea. The 325th was again inactivated in late 1968. The 325th Fighter Wing was activated on 18 October 1956 and was assigned the 325th group as a subordinate unit controlling its operational squadrons.

On 22 October 1962, before President John F. Kennedy told Americans that missiles were in place in Cuba, the wing dispersed a portion of its force, equipped with nuclear tipped missiles to Paine Air Force Base at the start of the Cuban Missile Crisis. These planes returned to McChord after the crisis.

On 15 March 1963 two Soviet bombers overflew Alaska and Alaskan Air Command F-102s were unable to intercept them. The response to this intrusion was to deploy ten F-106s from the wing to Alaska in what was called Operation White Shoes. However, maintaining these aircraft for an extended period of time put a strain on the wing's combat readiness back at McChord, and eventually a detachment of maintenance personnel was established to maintain the planes in Alaska. The wing got relief from this commitment while it was upgrading its F-106s from the 1st Fighter Wing, which relieved it from March to June 1964. Operation White Shoes terminated in 1965 and the unit's planes returned home.

The wing was reactivated at Tyndall Air Force Base in 1981 as the 325th Fighter Weapons Wing, providing the Air Defense Weapons Center with operational and technical advice on air defense and tactics from 1981 to 1983. It also provided test and evaluation new air defense equipment, including use of the PQM-102 and QF-100, former operational aircraft modified to function as unmanned drones known as Full Scale Aerial Targets (FSAT). This FSAT mission would later transfer to what is now the 53rd Weapons Evaluation Group (53 WEG) of the 53rd Wing (53 WG).

=== F-15 Eagle ===
In October 1983, the wing was renamed the 325th Tactical Training Wing and assumed a new mission of conducting qualification training of F-15 tactical aircrews. Beginning in 1983 it deployed T-33 and later, F-15 aircraft to USAF, Air National Guard, Marine Corps, and Navy air units to provide electronic countermeasures and dissimilar air combat training (DACT) and to increase aircrew combat proficiency. The wing also performed continental air defense alert duties from 1988 to 1990, intercepting unidentified aircraft, assisting the U.S. Drug Enforcement Administration in anti-smuggling efforts, and augmenting similarly tasked fighter units in the Louisiana Air National Guard and Florida Air National Guard. It became the host wing at Tyndall Air Force Base in September 1991 and was renamed the 325th Fighter Wing the following month.

=== F-22 Raptor ===
In 1998, the 325th divested the F-15A/B Formal Training Unit mission, transferring it to the 173d Fighter Wing (173 FW) of the Oregon Air National Guard. In 2003, the 325th added the 43d Fighter Squadron to conduct F-22 training in addition to the F-15C/D training mission. Until 2010, the 325 FW conducted both F-15C/D and F-22A training when the 173 FW fully assumed the F-15C/D FTU role for both the Regular Air Force and the Air National Guard.

The 325th has conducted the Air Force's basic course and transition training for the F-22A since 2003, training pilots from the Regular Air Force, the Air Force Reserve Command (AFRC) and the Air National Guard (ANG) in the aircraft. In October 2012, the wing was reassigned from Air Education and Training Command (AETC) to Air Combat Command (ACC), since it had added a combat coded F-22 squadron by reactivating the 95th Fighter Squadron (95 FS), formerly an F-15C squadron at Tyndall, in addition to its F-22 and T-38 training units. The 95 FS and other elements of the wing completed their first six-month long combat deployment with the Raptor in May 2015.

In the wake of the devastating damage to Tyndall AFB by Hurricane Michael in late 2018, F-22 and T-38 flight training operations were shifted to the former Strike Fighter Squadron 101 (VFA-101) F-35C training facility recently vacated by the U.S. Navy at Eglin AFB, Florida. Concurrently, the combat-coded F-22A aircraft of the 95 FS were redistributed to other F-22 units in Virginia, Hawaii and Alaska and the squadron placed in cadre status.

=== F-35 Lightning II ===
Following over two years of speculation, the Air Force announced in 2021 that 325th is set to be equipped with the F-35A Lightning II, the USAF's newest combat fighter. The wing will host three F-35 squadrons, altogether making up 72 aircraft. The first tranche of F-35A aircraft are expected to begin arriving at Tyndall in September or October 2023. In August 2023, the 95th Fighter Generation Squadron recovered the first four 325 FW assigned aircraft.

== Lineage ==
- Established as the 325th Fighter Wing, All Weather on 10 May 1948

Activated on 9 June 1948
Redesignated 325th Fighter-All Weather Wing on 20 January 1950
Redesignated 325th Fighter-Interceptor Wing on 1 May 1951
Inactivated on 6 February 1952

- Redesignated 325th Fighter Wing (Air Defense) on 14 September 1956

Activated on 18 October 1956
Discontinued and inactivated on 1 July 1968

- Redesignated 325th Fighter Weapons Wing on 17 June 1981

Activated on 1 July 1981
Redesignated 325th Tactical Training Wing on 15 October 1983
Redesignated 325th Fighter Wing on 1 October 1991

== Assignments ==
- Fourth Air Force, 9 June 1948

Attached to Western Air Defense Force, 10 November 1949 – 31 July 1950

- Western Air Defense Force, 1 August 1950 – 6 February 1952
- 25th Air Division, 18 October 1956
- Seattle Air Defense Sector, 10 February 1960
- 25th Air Division, 1 April 1966 – 1 July 1968
- USAF Air Defense Weapons Center, 1 July 1981
- First Air Force, 12 September 1991
- Nineteenth Air Force, 1 July 1993
- Ninth Air Force, 1 October 2012 – 20 August 2020
- Fifteenth Air Force, 20 August 2020 – present

== Components ==
Wings

- 302d Troop Carrier: attached 6 May 1950 – 8 June 1951

Groups

- 325th Fighter (later, 325th Fighter-Interceptor; 325th Fighter; 325th Operations): 9 June 1948 – 6 February 1952; 18 October 1956 – 25 March 1960; 1 September 1991–present

Squadrons

- 1st Tactical Fighter Training: 1 January 1984 – 15 December 2006
- 2d Fighter-Interceptor Training (later, 2d Fighter Weapons; 2d Tactical Fighter Training Squadron; 2d Fighter Training Squadron): 1 July 1981 – 11 May 2010; 22 Aug 2014 - present
- 4th Troop Carrier: attached 1 May – 17 July 1950
- 43rd Fighter Squadron: 1 Oct 2002–present
- 82d Tactical Aerial Target (later, 82d Tactical Aerial Targets): 1 July 1981 – 15 October 1983
- 95th Fighter Interceptor Training (later, 95th Tactical Fighter Training Squadron; 95th Fighter Squadron): 1 July 1981 – present
- 123d Fighter: attached 10–12 February 1951
- 317th Fighter Interceptor Squadron: attached 18 October 1956-c. June 1957
- 318th Fighter Interceptor Squadron: attached 18 October 1956-c. June 1957; assigned 25 March 1960 – 1 July 1968
- 325th Air Control Squadron: 15 October 1983 – 3 October 2012 (redesignated 337th ACS on 3 October 2012 and remains at Tyndall as a geographically separated unit of the 33d Fighter Wing at Eglin Air Force Base)
- 460th Fighter-Interceptor Training Squadron: 15 January – 15 October 1982
- 475th Test Squadron: 1 July 1981 – 15 October 1983
- 498th Fighter-Interceptor Squadron: attached 18 October 1956-c. June 1957; 1 July 1963 – 25 June 1966
- 4756th Air Defense: 1 July 1981 – 15 October 1983

School

- USAF Interceptor Weapons: 1 July 1981 – 15 October 1983.

== Stations ==
- Hamilton Air Force Base, California, 9 June 1948
- Moses Lake Air Force Base, Washington, 23 November 1948
- McChord Air Force Base, Washington, 20 April 1950 – 6 February 1952
- McChord Air Force Base, Washington, 18 October 1956 – 1 July 1968
- Tyndall Air Force Base, Florida, 1 July 1981 – present

== Aircraft assigned ==
- P-61 Black Widow (1947–1948)
- F-82 Twin Mustang (1948–1951)
- F-94 Starfire (1950–1952)
- C-54 Skymaster (1950)
- P-51 Mustang (1951–1952)
- F-86 Sabre (1955–1957)
- F-102 Delta Dagger (1956–1960)
- F-106 Delta Dart (1960, 1981–1983)
- F-101 Voodoo (1981–1982)
- T-33 Shooting Star (1981–1988)
- TF/QF/PQM-102 (1981–1983)
- QF-100 (1982–1983)
- F-15 Eagle (1983–2010)
- F-22 Raptor (2003–present)
- F-35A Lightning II (2023–present)
