= 1st Fighter Squadron =

Inactive US Air Force unit

1st Fighter Squadron

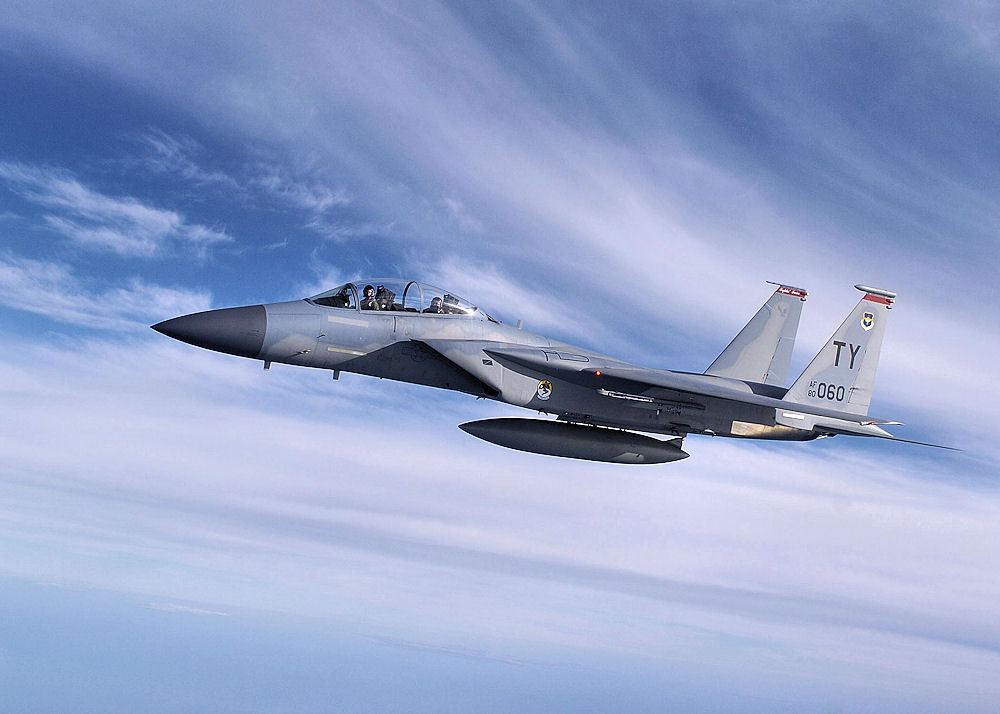
- F-15 Eagle from Tyndall Air Force Base
- Active: 1944–46; 1954–59; 1984–2006
- Country: United States
- Branch: United States Air Force
- Role: Fighter Training
- Nickname(s): Fighting Furies
- Engagements: World War II
- Decorations: Air Force Outstanding Unit Award

Commanders
- Notable commanders: Charles E. "Chuck" Yeager

Insignia
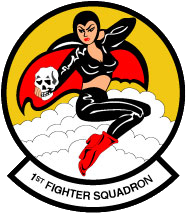
- 1st Fighter Squadron emblem (approved 1 March 1945) (Note: This emblem was reinstated in June 1994. Haulman, Factsheet, 1 Fighter Squadron)

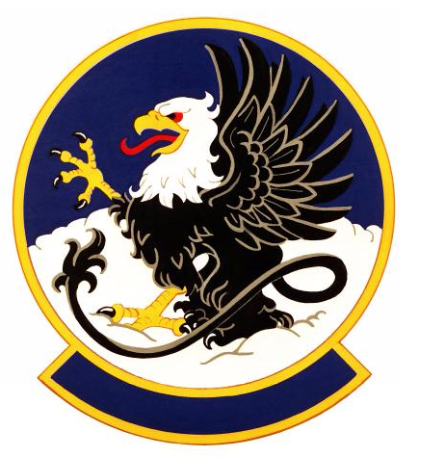
- 1st Tactical Fighter Training Squadron emblem (approved May 1984)

The 1st Fighter Squadron is an inactive unit of the United States Air Force. It was most recently based at Tyndall Air Force Base, Florida, where it operated McDonnell Douglas F-15C Eagle aircraft conducting advanced fighter training.

== Mission ==
The 1 FS provided fully qualified F-15 Eagle pilots for worldwide assignment by conducting formal ground, simulator, and flight training.

== History ==
The 1st flew P-47 Thunderbolt aircraft during World War II. While based on Ie Shima the 1 FS launched Thunderbolts against the Japanese, amassing almost 1,200 combat air patrol, bombing, strafing, and escort missions. During this era, the squadron emblem was "Miss Fury," a 1940s-era comic strip superheroine. The 1 FS was inactivated on 15 October 1946, after the war had ended.

The 1 FS was activated as part of the 413th Fighter-Day Wing on 11 November 1954. The squadron trained pilots in the F-86 Sabre from 1954 to 1956 and the F-100 Super Sabre from 1956 to 1959. The 1st operated out of George Air Force Base, California, until it was again inactivated on 15 March 1959, with Lieutenant Colonel Charles E. "Chuck" Yeager as commander.

The squadron was reactivated 1 January 1984, as part of the 325th Tactical Training Wing, at Tyndall Air Force Base, Florida, to train pilots in the F-15 Eagle.

On 17 September 1991, the operations and maintenance functions of the 1st joined to form a combined squadron. The squadron continued to train F-15 pilots for the combat air forces and received several honors, such as earning the Air Force Maintenance Effectiveness Award for 1998, Nineteenth Air Force Top Operations Squadron of the Year for 1998, and 325th Fighter Wing Fighter Squadron of the Year for 1995, 1997, and 1998.

Other notable accomplishments include receiving the U. S. Air Force Air Flight Safety of the Year award for 2002, as well as recognition for best intelligence mission report. Also, members received by-name recognition during the 2003 Headquarters Air Education and Training Command Operational Readiness Inspection.

The 1st Fighter Squadron was inactivated on 15 December 2006.

== Lineage ==
- Constituted as the 1st Fighter Squadron, Single Engine on 5 October 1944

Activated on 15 October 1944
Inactivated on 15 October 1946

- Redesignated 1st Fighter-Day Squadron on 26 August 1954

Activated on 11 November 1954

- Redesignated 1st Tactical Fighter Squadron on 1 July 1958

Inactivated on 15 March 1959

- Redesignated 1st Tactical Fighter Training Squadron on 14 October 1983

Activated on 1 January 1984

- Redesignated 1st Fighter Squadron on 1 November 1991

Inactivated on 15 December 2006

=== Assignments ===
- 413th Fighter Group, 5 October 1944 – 15 October 1956
- 413th Fighter-Day Group, 11 November 1954
- 413th Fighter-Day Wing (later 413th Tactical Fighter Wing), 8 October 1957 – 15 March 1959 (attached to Sixteenth Air Force, 27 June – c. 12 November 1958)
- 325th Tactical Training Wing, 1 January 1984
- 325th Operations Group, 1 September 1991 – 15 December 2006

=== Stations ===
- Seymour Johnson Field, North Carolina, 15 October 1944
- Bluethenthal Field, North Carolina, 9 November 1944 – 7 April 1945
- Ie Shima Airfield, Okinawa, 19 May 1945
- Kadena Air Base, Okinawa, c. 17 November 1945
- Yontan Airfield, Okinawa, 29 January 1946 – 15 October 1946
- George Air Force Base, California, 11 November 1954 – 15 March 1959 (deployed at Morón Air Base, Spain (27 June – c. 12 November 1958)
- Tyndall Air Force Base, Florida, 1 January 1984 – 15 December 2006

=== Aircraft ===
- P-47 Thunderbolt (1944–1946)
- F-86 Sabre (1954–1956)
- F-100 Super Sabre (1956–1959)
- F-15 Eagle (1984–2006)

== See also ==
- 1st Helicopter Squadron, redesignated
