= 337th Air Control Squadron =

US Air Force squadron

337th Air Control Squadron
- Active: 1958–1994; 2012–present
- Country: United States
- Branch: United States Air Force
- Type: Command and Control Training
- Part of: Air Education and Training Command
- Garrison/HQ: Tyndall Air Force Base
- Motto(s): Imperio et Moderatio Latin Command and Control
- Decorations: Air Force Outstanding Unit Award

Insignia
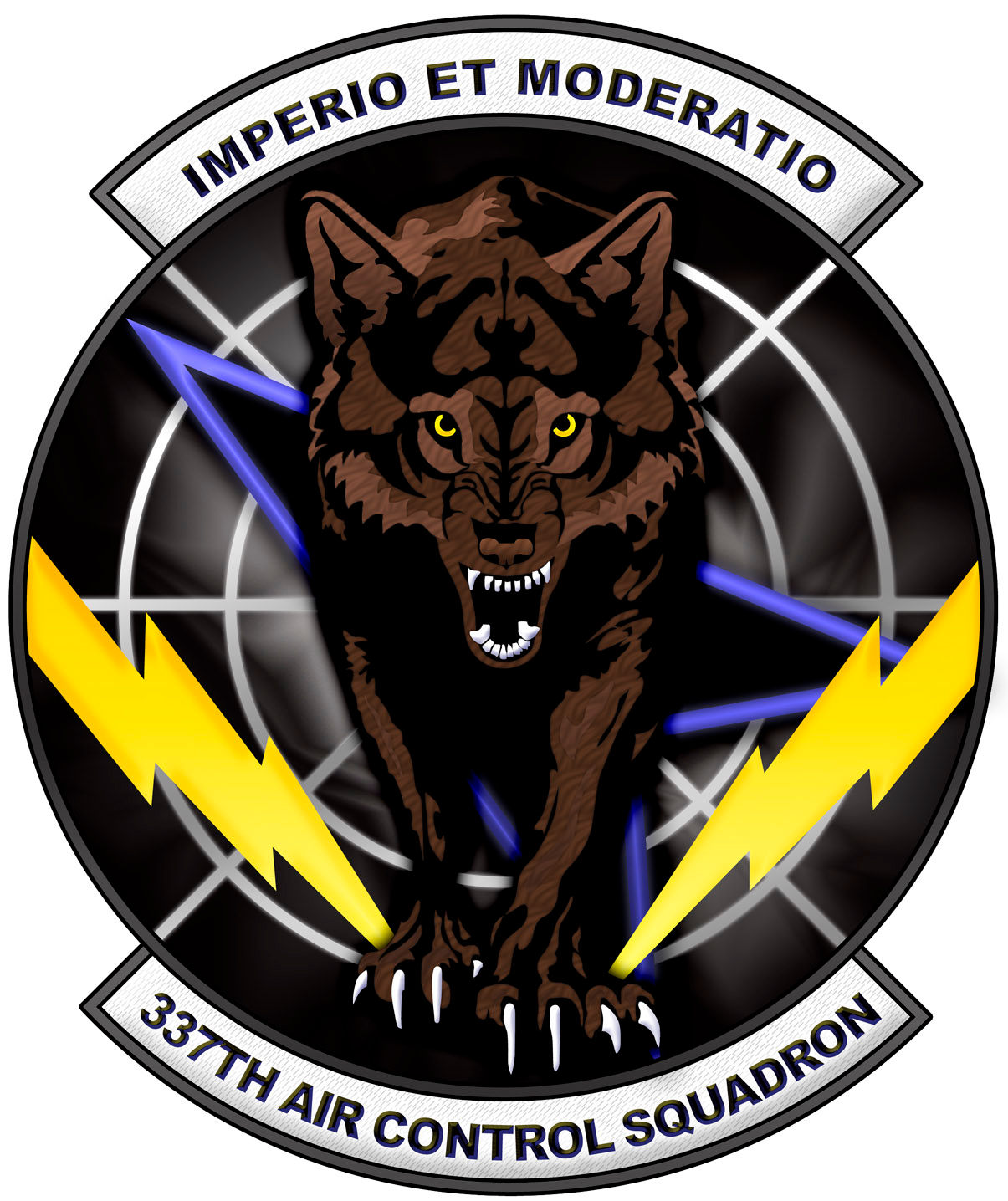
- 337th Air Control Squadron emblem

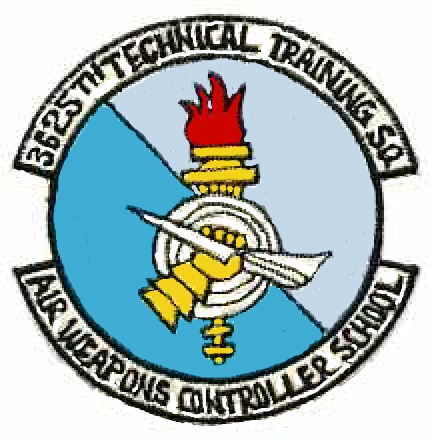
- Patch with 3625th Technical Training Squadron emblem (approved 12 December 1958) (Note: This emblem was approved when the 3625th was a group on a shield. When the 3625th became a squadron, it placed the emblem on a disc.)

The 337th Air Control Squadron is part of the 33d Fighter Wing, an Air Education and Training Command (AETC) unit, based at the United States Air Force's Tyndall Air Force Base, Florida. The squadron's present mission was activated at Tyndall in 1947, making it the base's oldest surviving mission. During the past decades, radar operations and maintenance has been taught to tens of thousands of personnel of all ranks.

== Mission ==
The 337th is primarily responsible for the initial training of all Active duty, Air National Guard, and reserve Air Force Air Battle Manager officers in command and control mission execution. The squadron also provides training international officers in command and control operations, as well as providing command and control support for Lockheed Martin F-22 Raptor initial and transition training at Tyndall AFB.

== History ==
Following the 325th Fighter Wing's change to Air Combat Command, the 325th Air Control Squadron training mission was transferred to the 337th Air Control Squadron under the 33d Fighter Wing.

== Current operations ==
As of January 2012 the squadron instructs five comprehensive courses. The primary course is the six-month Undergraduate Air Battle Manager Training course, where officers learn everything from radar theory to large force employment. Graduates of this course receive follow-on assignments to the combat Air Forces to perform air battle management in the Control and Reporting Centers or on the E-3 AWACS or E-8 Joint STARS aircraft. Additional courses include the Battle Manager Instructor Training Course, which teaches air battle managers from different backgrounds the skills necessary to instruct undergraduate students, and the Air Weapons Officer/Weapons Director Initial Qualification Training Course, which teaches previously qualified air battle managers and weapons directors the art and science of controlling live aircraft. The 337th ACS also conducts the International Air Weapons Controller Course and the Theater Air Operations Course, where officers from around the world are introduced to weapons control and theater air operations.

In addition to the F-22, the squadron also assisted with the training of F-15 Eagle pilots until their departure from Tyndall in 2010.

== Lineage ==
- Designated as the 3625th Technical Training Group (Weapons Controller) and organized on 15 August 1958

Redesignated 3625th Technical Training Squadron (Weapons Controller) on 1 July 1963
Redesignated 331st Technical Training Squadron on 15 September 1992
Redesignated 337th Training Squadron on 1 April 1994
Inactivated on 1 September 1994

- Redesignated 337th Air Control Squadron and activated on 12 October 2012

=== Assignments ===
- Air Training Command, 15 August 1958
- 3380th Technical School, USAF, 1 July 1963
- USAF School of Applied Aerospace Sciences, Keesler, 1 August 1972
- 3390th Technical Training Group, 30 April 1976
- 3400th Technical Training Group, 1 July 1985
- 3300th Technical Training Wing (later 3300th Technical Training Group, 393d Technical Training Group 81st Technical Training Group), 1 July 1986
- 325th Operations Group, 1 April–1 September 1994
- 33d Operations Group, 12 October 2012 – present

=== Stations ===
- Tyndall Air Force Base, Florida, 15 August 1958 – 1 September 1994
- Tyndall Air Force Base, Florida, 12 October 2012 – present
