= Tyndall Air Force Base =

US Air Force base near Panama City, Florida

- Near Panama City, Florida in United States
- One of the first F-35A Lightning II aircraft arriving at Tyndall Air Force Base, captured August 1, 2023.

Site information
- Type: US Air Force Base
- Owner: Department of Defense
- Operator: US Air Force
- Controlled by: Air Combat Command (ACC)
- Condition: Operational
- Website: www.tyndall.af.mil

Location
- Location within North America Location within the United States Location within Florida Location within North Atlantic
- Coordinates: 30°04′43″N 085°34′35″W

Site history
- Built: 1941 (as Tyndall Field)
- In use: 1941–present

Garrison information
- Current commander: Colonel Chris Bergtholdt
- Garrison: 325th Fighter Wing (Host); 44th Fighter Group

Airfield information
- Identifiers: IATA: PAM, ICAO: KPAM, FAA LID: PAM, WMO: 747750
- Elevation: 5.1 metres (17 ft) AMSL
Runways
Direction	Length and surface
14R/32L	3,082.4 metres (10,113 ft) Concrete
14L/32R	3,050.4 metres (10,008 ft) Concrete

Tyndall Air Force Base (IATA: PAM, ICAO: KPAM, FAA LID: PAM) is a United States Air Force Base located 12 miles (19 km) east of Panama City, Florida. The base was named in honor of World War I pilot 1st Lt. Frank Benjamin Tyndall.

The base operating unit and host wing is the 325th Fighter Wing (325 FW) of the Air Combat Command (ACC). The 325th is projected to host three operational F-35A Lightning II squadrons with the 95th Fighter Squadron reactivating first in 2023.

In October 2018, Hurricane Michael would cause significant damage to the base. Since then, after post-hurricane damage assessments, debris removal, and initial facility repairs, Tyndall Air Force Base would be designated to be the new home of an F-35A mission. Tyndall would be framed as the "Installation of the Future" with the primary goal of having the installation be rebuilt to be more sustainable, resilient, and integrative of SMART systems.

== History ==
Tyndall Field first opened its doors on 7 December 1941, as a gunnery range. The airfield was named in honor of 1st Lt Frank Benjamin Tyndall. With the establishment of the United States Air Force in 1947, the facility was renamed "Tyndall Air Force Base" on 13 January 1948. In December 1940, a site board determined that Flexible Gunnery School No. 9 would be located 12 miles (19 km) southeast of Panama City, Florida, on East Peninsula. On 6 May 1941, U.S. Army and local dignitaries held an official ground breaking for the school. Panama City's mayor, Harry Fannin, dug the first spade full of sand, and Colonel Warren Maxwell, Tyndall's first commander, wielded the first ax on the stubborn palmetto plants, so common on the East Peninsula. The site was covered with pine and palmetto trees, scrub brush, and swamps. Bulldozers worked around the clock to clear the brush and fill in swamps. The base also subsumed the settlements of Cromanton, San Blas, Redfish Point, Auburn and Farmdale.

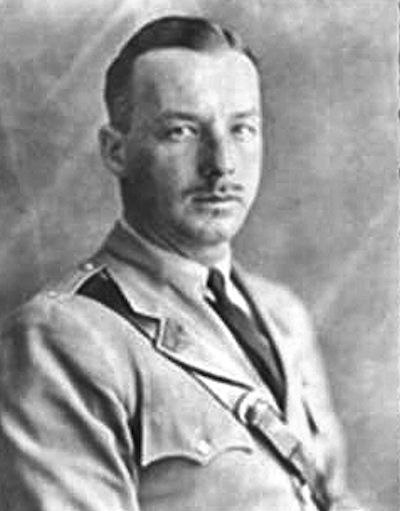
Lieutenant Francis B. Tyndall (1894–1930)

Although construction was well underway, the base lacked a name. Congressman Bob Sikes suggested naming the school in memory of Lieutenant Francis B. Tyndall. A native of Sewall's Point, Florida, Lieutenant Tyndall was a fighter pilot during World War I, Silver Star recipient, and commander of the 22nd Aero Squadron, who was credited with shooting down six German planes well behind enemy lines in 1918. While inspecting Army fields near Mooresville, North Carolina, on 15 July 1930, Tyndall's plane, Curtiss P-1F Hawk, 28–61, crashed, killing him instantly. On 13 June 1941, the War Department officially named the new installation Tyndall Field.

On 7 December 1941, the first of 2,000 troops arrived at Tyndall Field. The first class of gunnery students began in February 1942. Although construction was incomplete, instructors and students began preparing for the first class. The first class of 40 gunnery students began on 23 February 1942. Of the thousands of students passing through the Tyndall gates, the most famous was actor Clark Gable, a student here as a U.S. Army Air Forces lieutenant during late 1942 and part of January 1943. Foreign student training began at Tyndall in 1943 with French Air Force gunnery students being the first and Chinese students following later that year.

=== Cold War ===
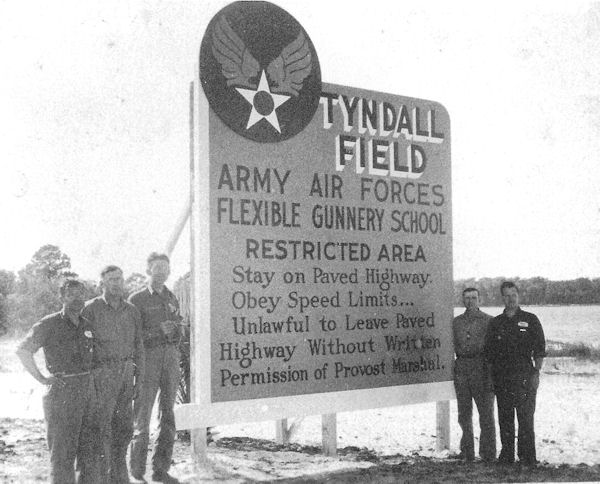
Base entrance during World War II

When World War II ended, Tyndall Field was demobilized. The base fell under the control of the Tactical Air Command (TAC) in 1946, but this only lasted three months, as Tyndall became part of the Air University (AU). Tyndall Field was subsequently renamed as Tyndall Air Force Base when the U.S. Air Force (USAF) became a separate service in 1947.

In September 1950, Tyndall became an Air Training Command (ATC) installation, designated as the USAF Pilot Instructor School. The base also trained Ground Controlled Intercept (GCI) operators as well as interceptor pilots & flight crews for the Air Defense Command (ADC). Under the auspices of this training system, GCI trainees would direct TF-51H Mustangs against "enemy" A-26 Invaders. In late 1952, both aircraft were replaced by Lockheed T-33 Shooting Star jet trainers. Airborne radar operator students would begin their training aboard radar-equipped TB-25 Mitchells, then transition to either Lockheed F-94 Starfire or Northrop F-89 Scorpion aircraft. North American F-86F and F-86Ds were eventually added to the training program as ADC units were equipped with them.

In September 1957, Tyndall became an Air Defense Command, later Aerospace Defense Command, base until October 1979 when ADC was inactivated and all its bases and units transferred to Tactical Air Command. Tyndall was headquarters of the ADC 73d Air Division in the late 1950s, and the NORAD Southeast Air Defense Sector from 1960 to 1979. ADC's 20th Air Division based at Tyndall was responsible for the air defense of virtually all of the southeastern United States during the 1960s and 1970s, while ADC's 23d Air Division, also based at Tyndall, was responsible for air defense forces in the upper midwest and south central United States.

==== Fighter-Interceptor base ====
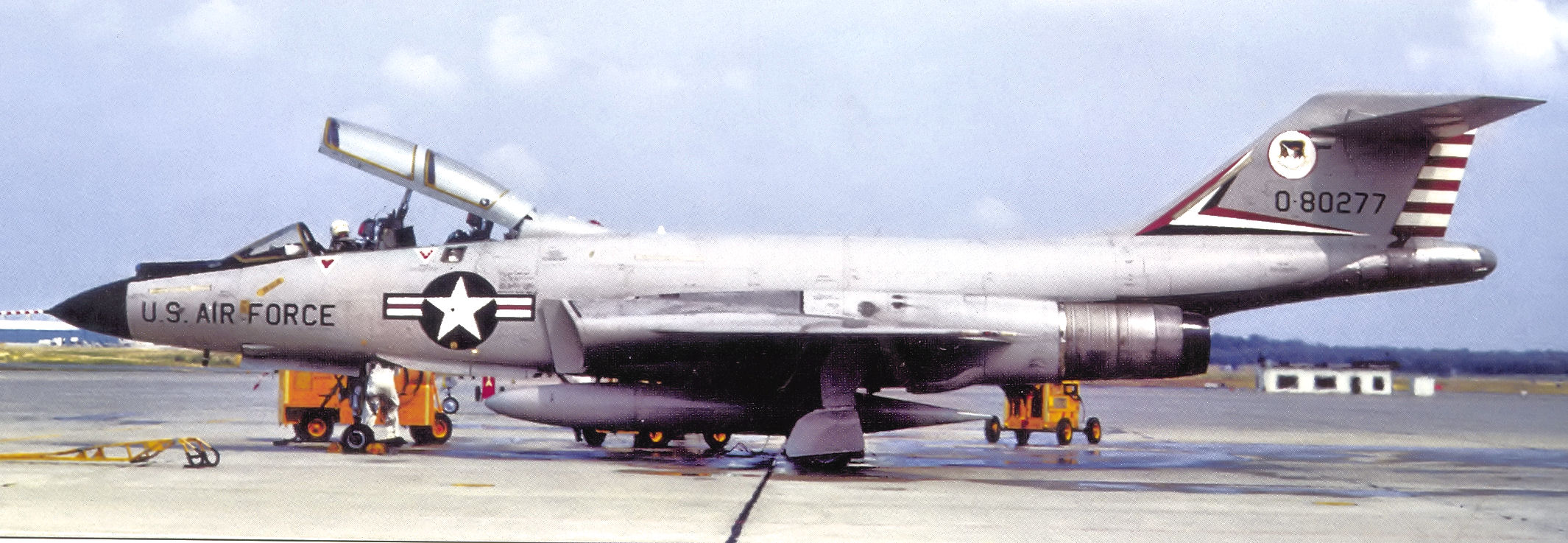
McDonnell F-101 Voodoo at Tyndall AFB in August 1972.

In the late 1950s into the 1960s, the base transitioned into the North American F-100 Super Sabre, F-101B, F-102A and TF-102B, F-104 Starfighter, and the F-106A and B aircraft, training interceptor pilots for ADC assignments. The base served as a stopover and refueling point for ADC aircraft deployed to Florida during the Cuban Missile Crisis, to be redeployed to other bases in the southeast shortly thereafter. The base maintained an alert facility from which the F-101 Voodoo and F-102 Delta Dagger interceptors were scrambled to intercept unknown aircraft. Tyndall shared training for the F-102 aircraft with Perrin AFB, Texas, until Perrin's closure in mid-1971.

==== Radar station 1956–present ====
On 1 July 1956 Tyndall AFB became the station operating for the third phase of the ADC mobile radar program, designated as TM-198. Activated by the 678th Aircraft Control and Warning Squadron, Tyndall became operational to support the CIM-10 Bomarc surface-to-air missile program at Hurlburt Field. In 1958 the site was operating with an AN/FPS-20 search radar and a pair of AN/FPS-6 height-finder sets to support the 4751st Air Defense Missile Squadron.

In 1962 the search radar was upgraded and re-designated as an AN/FPS-64. On 31 July 1963, the site was redesignated as NORAD ID Z-198. During 1965 Tyndall AFB joined the Semi Automatic Ground Environment (SAGE) system, feeding data to DC-09 at Gunter AFB, Alabama. After joining, the squadron was re-designated as the 678th Radar Squadron (SAGE) on 1 June 1965. Also in 1965, Tyndall became a joint-use facility with the Federal Aviation Administration (FAA).

It also received a Back-Up Interceptor Control (BUIC) II, and later BUIC III, capability to perform command and control functions. Tyndall retained this function until the 1980s. On 1 March 1970, the 678th was redesignated as the 678th Air Defense Group.

In addition to the main facility, Tyndall operated two AN/FPS-14 Gap Filler sites:

- Carrabelle, FL (TM-198A): 29°51′57″N 084°37′53″W
- Eglin AFB, FL (TM-198B): 30°33′14″N 086°45′36″W

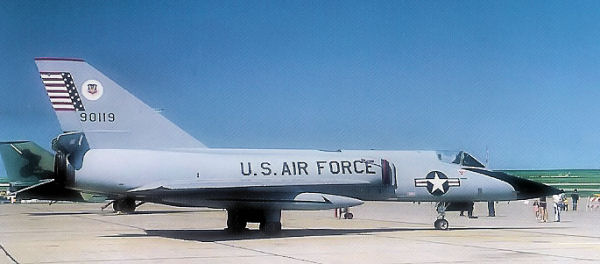
Convair F-106 Delta Dart at Tyndall AFB, 1979.

On 1 October 1979, this site came under Tactical Air Command jurisdiction with the inactivation of Aerospace Defense Command and the formation of ADTAC. On 1 March 1983 the 678th Air Defense Group was inactivated and Tyndall became the home of the NORAD 23rd ADS (Air Defense Squadron) and operated the Southeast Regional Operations Control Center (SE ROCC), later renamed Sector Operations Control Center (SOCC).

The height-finder radar, modified as an AN/FPS-116 c. 1977, was removed c. 1988. In 1995 an AN/FPS-64A was performing search duties. The site now operates an ARSR-4 search radar under FAA control as part of the Joint Surveillance System (JSS) as site "J-11".

=== Reorganization, 1991–2018 ===
In 1991, Tyndall underwent a reorganization in response to the Department of Defense efforts to streamline defense management. Headquarters, First Air Force, what had predominantly been the Numbered Air Force for the Air National Guard, moved from Langley AFB, Virginia, to Tyndall. With the disestablishment of Tactical Air Command (TAC) in 1992, Tyndall was temporarily transferred to the Air Combat Command (ACC) and then to the Air Education and Training Command (AETC) in July 1993.

The 21st century proved to be momentous for Tyndall AFB, because it was selected as the first home of the Air Force's newest aircraft, the F-22 Raptor. In 2002 the Chief of Staff of the Air Force changed the organizational structure of the 325th Fighter Wing from an objective type wing to a combat organization. This organization moved all maintenance activities under the 325th Maintenance Group and all support activities under the 325th Mission Support Group.

Early 2000's the 325th Fighter Wing would providing training for all F-22A Raptor pilots. In 2012, with the gaining of a combat-coded F-22 squadron, Tyndall AFB returned to Air Combat Command, after a 19-year tenure in AETC.

=== Hurricane Michael, 2018 ===
On 10 October 2018 Hurricane Michael made landfall as a Category 5 hurricane at Mexico Beach just to the east of the base. A weather station near the base recorded a wind gust of 130 miles per hour (210 km/h) before it failed, according to the National Hurricane Center advisory shortly after landfall. The National Weather Service, in a preliminary report released later in the month, stated that the maximum sustained wind speed at the base was 75 knots (139 km/h; 86 mph) (Note: The report contains a note that "anemometer height is 10 meters and wind averaging is 2 minutes". The sustained wind speeds in tropical cyclones are usually measured by 1-minute average wind speed at a height of 10 meters (33 ft) above the ground by the National Hurricane Center, while other parts of the world use the average over a 10-minute period.) and the maximum wind gust was 121 knots (224 km/h; 139 mph), both from 60°. However, in a later interview with Aviation Week on 27 October 2018, Commander Air Combat Command general James M. Holmes stated that, based on other data, the actual peak wind speed was closer to 172 mph. Ninety-three Air Force personnel remained on the base during the storm, while the base's remaining 3,600 personnel and their families (a total of over 11,000 individuals) were evacuated beforehand. Air Force officials described the damage to the base from the hurricane as "catastrophic," with all of the base's facilities being declared "unlivable". While efforts to repair the base were underway, as of 12 October 2018 there was no confirmed time of completion on the repairs, according to 325th Fighter Wing Commander Col Brian Laidlaw. Airmen assigned to the 325th Fighter Wing were told they would be away from the installation for a significant amount of time. Thirty-three of Tyndall´s 55 F-22 stealth fighters were flown to Wright-Patterson Air Force Base near Dayton, Ohio before the storm. Many of the seventeen F-22s which were left behind became damaged. The extent of the damage to the planes was then unknown. According to US Senator Bill Nelson and Congressman Matt Gaetz, the aircraft left behind were not in a condition to be flown. A spokesperson for the Air Force said that none of the F-22s were destroyed and that they "believe at this time that they are all repairable."

In April 2019, the Air Force estimated the hurricane damage to the base at $4.7 billion.

In April 2022, Detachment 1 of the 823rd Red Horse Squadron inactivated at Tyndall and was replaced by the 801st Red Horse Training Squadron. The unit's role is to provide integrated, realistic training and exercises to combat support teams.

== Environmental issues ==
The soil of an aerial gunnery school training range on Tyndall was contaminated with lead from 12-gauge shotgun shells during World War II. Tyndall Elementary was constructed on the former site of this training range; In 2009 a $5.5 million remediation of the soil at the school was completed and a perimeter fence put up, including a "buffer zone" outside the fence. When the hurricane destroyed the fence in October 2018, contractors erected a temporary replacement slightly offset which included some sections contaminated with lead to be located within the campus. As of August 2019, a new perimeter fence was planned to be erected until 12 August 2019 and School district officials were planning to contact families of the 180 affected students.

== Organization, 1941–present ==
=== Major units assigned, 1941–present ===
- 80th Air Base Group, 1 August 1941 – 2 October 1942
- 69th Base HQ and Air Base Sq, 6 July 1942 – 30 April 1944
- 2135th AAF Base Unit, 1 May 1944 – 30 October 1945
- 308th AAF Base Unit, 1 March 1946 – 27 February 1948
- 500th Aerodrome Gp, 17 May 1947 – 27 July 1948
- 3625th Training Wing

Various Designations, 28 July 1948 – 15 August 1958

- USAF Instructor Flight School, 1 October 1949 – 1 December 1951
- USAF Interceptor Weapons School, 20 August 1956 – 1 March 1970
- 73d Air Division, 1 July 1957 – 1 April 1966
- 4756th Air Defense Wing, 1 July 1957 – 1 January 1968
- 4756th Drone Squadron

Redesignated 4756th Air Depot Squadron, 1 July 1957 – 1 July 1992

- 20th Air Division, 20 January – 1 April 1966; 19 November 1969 – 1 October 1979
- 73d Aerospace Surveillance Wing, 17 June 1967 – 30 April 1971
- USAF Pilot Instructors School, 8 October 1967 – 23 August 1972
- 23d Air Division, 19 November 1969 – 1 October 1979; 15 April 1982 – 1 July 1987
- 678th Air Defense Group, 1 March 1970 – 1 October 1979
- 4750th Test Squadron, 1 January 1965 – 1 July 1992
- USAF Air Defense Weapons Center, 31 October 1967 – 1 July 1992
- HQ, Southeast Air Defense Sector, 1 January 1960 – 1 November 2005
- 325th Fighter Wing (Various Designations), 1 July 1981 – present

1st Fighter Squadron, 1 January 1984 – 15 December 2006
43d Fighter Squadron 1 October 2002 – present
95th Fighter Squadron, 1974 – 21 September 2010, October 2013 – present
2d Fighter Training Squadron, 1973 – 11 May 2010, August 2014 – present
325th Air Control Squadron (Various Designations), 15 October 1983 – 12 October 2012
Detachment 1, Headquarters, Florida Air National Guard (ANG), 1 October 1999 – present

325 FW Associate Unit (325 FW AU); F-22 flight instructor augment unit to 325 FW

- 337th Air Control Squadron (Air Education and Training Command), 12 October 2012 – present
- 44th Fighter Group (Air Force Reserve Command), 12 July 2014 – present

301st Fighter Squadron (AFRC), 12 July 2014 – present

- 53d Weapons Evaluation Group, 15 October 1983 – present

81st Range Control Squadron, 15 October 1983 – present
82d Aerial Targets Squadron, 15 October 1983 – present
83d Fighter Weapons Squadron, 15 October 1983 – present

- First Air Force, 12 September 1991 – present

601st Air Operations Center, 1 November 2005 – present
101st Air and Space Operations Group – Florida ANG, 21 August 2010 – present

- Det 1, 823rd Red Horse Squadron / Silver Flag Exercise Site, 1972 – 1979; 1992–present

References for history, major commands and major units

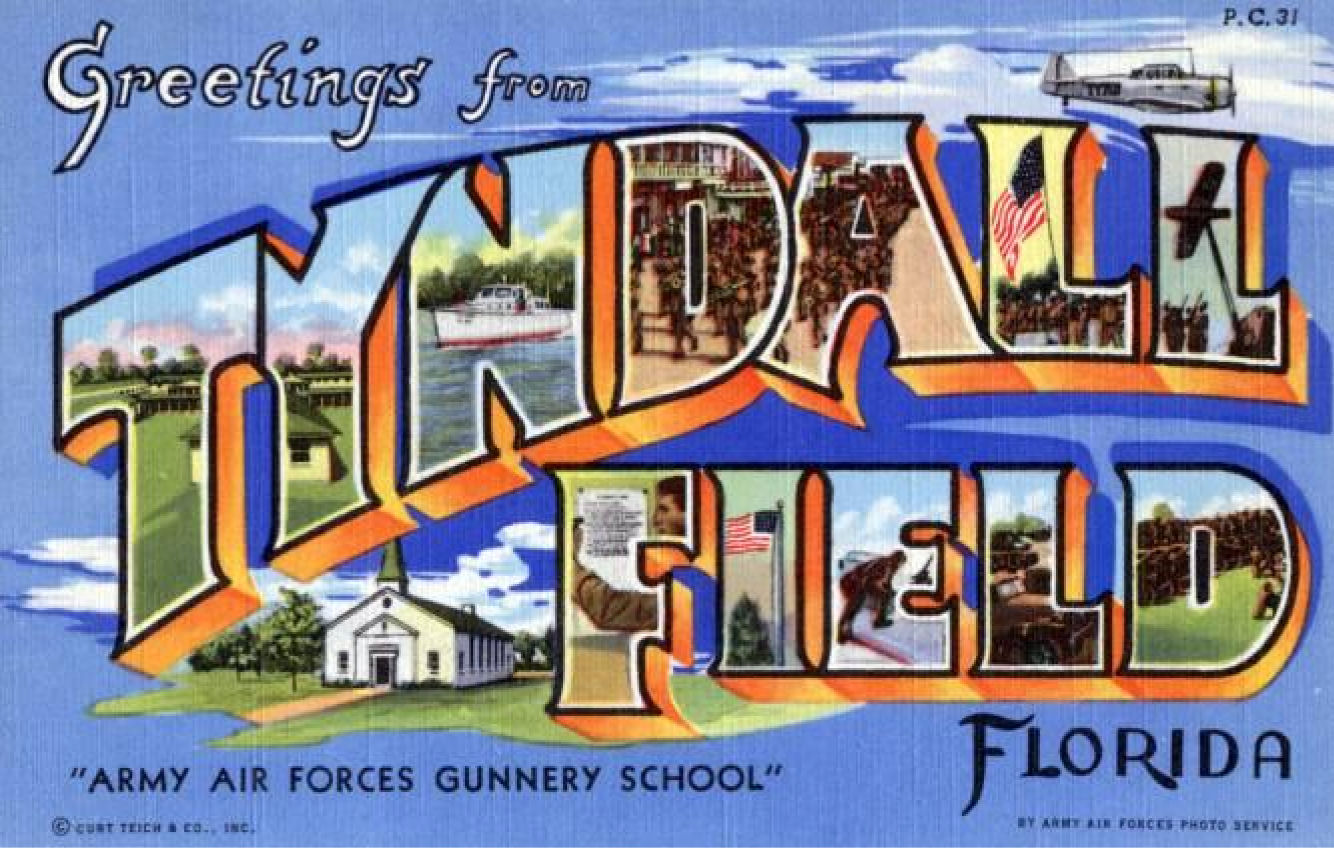
World War II Postcard

=== Major commands to which assigned, 1941–present ===
- Southeast Air Corps Training Center, 16 June 1941

USAAC Flexible Gunnery School, March 1941

- Air Corps Flying Training Command, 23 January 1942

Redesignated Army Air Forces Flying Training Command, 15 March 1942
Redesignated AAF Training Comd, 31 July 1943

- Continental Air Forces, 28 February 1946
- Tactical Air Command, 21 March 1946
- Air University, 15 May 1946
- Air Training Command, 1 September 1950
- Air Defense Command, 1 July 1957

Redesignated Aerospace Defense Command, 15 January 1968

- Tactical Air Command, 1 October 1979 – 1 June 1992
- Air Combat Command, 1 June 1992 – 1 July 1993
- Air Education and Training Command, 1 July 1993 – 30 September 2012
- Air Combat Command, 1 October 2012–present

== Role and operations ==
=== 325th Fighter Wing ===
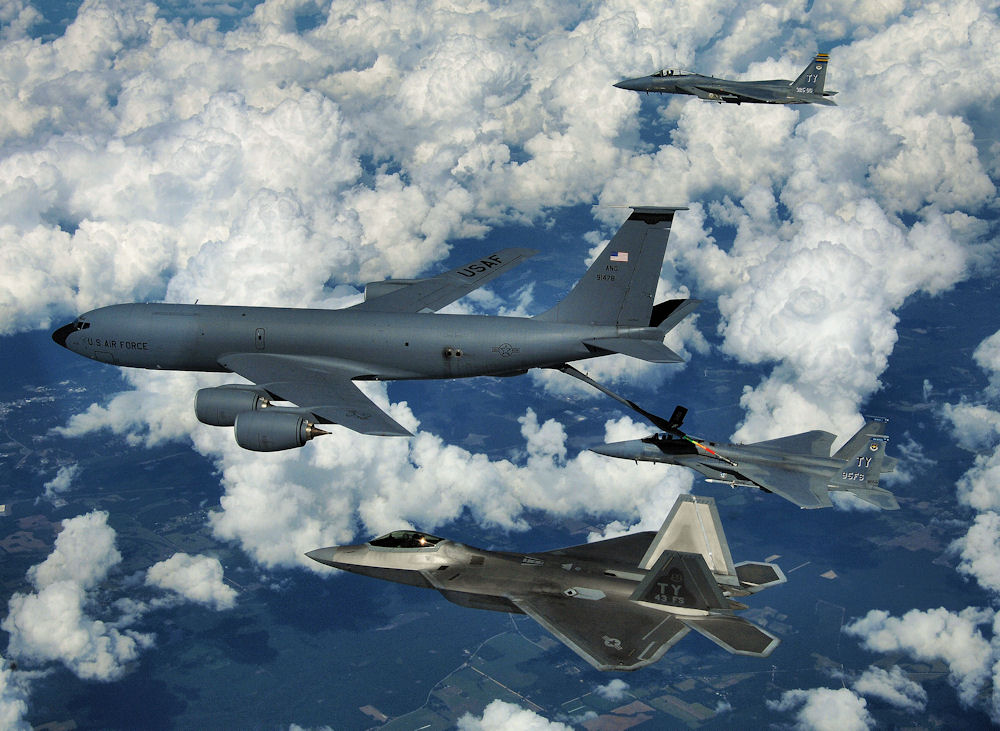
An F-22 Raptor and two F-15 Eagles from Tyndall Air Force Base participate in a refueling mission with a KC-135 Stratotanker from the Mississippi Air National Guard over eastern Florida, 22 September 2008.

The 325th Fighter Wing (325 FW)'s primary mission is to provide a combat ready air dominance force, train F-22A Raptor pilots and maintenance personnel, and train air battle managers to support the combat Air Force. Tyndall's combat mission is performed by the 95th Fighter Squadron. Training for F-22 pilots is performed in the 43d Fighter Squadron and the 2d Fighter Training Squadron. The 325th Air Control Squadron trains air battle managers for assignment to combat Air Force units. Additionally, wing personnel manage the southeastern air combat maneuvering instrumentation range and provide mission-ready F-15, F-16, and F-22 air dominance forces in support of the Commander, North American Aerospace Defense Command and the Commander, First Air Force (1 AF) / Air Forces Northern (AFNORTH) contingency plans.

From 1983 until 2010, training for F-15 Eagle pilots was performed at Tyndall AFB by the 1st, 2d, and 95th Fighter Squadrons in the F-15A, F-15B, F-15C and F-15D aircraft. The 1 FS inactivated in 2006, while the 2 FS and 95 FS inactivated in May and September 2010, respectively. During this time, Tyndall also hosted training for F-15C/D maintenance personnel and intelligence officers assigned to F-15C/D units. The 95 FS was reactivated in September 2013 as part of the F-22 Raptor consolidation plan that moved the 7th Fighter Squadron's aircraft to Tyndall. The 2nd Fighter Training Squadron was activated in 2014 to perform T-38 adversary operations in support of the F-22 training mission.

The 325th Fighter Wing is host to more than 30 tenant organizations located at Tyndall Air Force Base, Florida. The wing consists of the 325th Operations Group, 325th Maintenance Group, 325th Mission Support Group and 325th Medical Group. It is also augmented by two Air Reserve Component (ARC) units from the Air Force Reserve Command (AFRC) and the Air National Guard (ANG), respectively.

Detachment 1 of Headquarters, Florida Air National Guard (FL ANG) provides instructor pilot augmentation to the 325 FW, training active duty Air Force, Air Force Reserve and Air National Guard personnel to fly and fight F-22A Raptor aircraft.

=== 44th Fighter Group (44 FG) ===
The 44th Fighter Group is a classic association partnered with the 325th Fighter Wing at Tyndall Air Force Base, Fla., as well as a subordinate unit under the 301st Fighter Wing, Naval Air Station Fort Worth Joint Reserve Base, Texas. The unit's mission involves F-35 5th generation aircraft. The squadrons within the 44 FG are the 44 Maintenance Squadron, 301st Fighter Squadron and the 44 Aerospace Medical Flight.

=== First Air Force (1 AF) ===
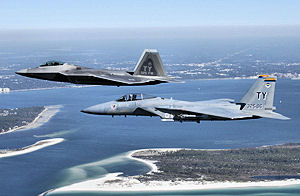
F-15C and F-22A over Tyndall AFB, 2008

Headquarters, First Air Force at Tyndall is part of the Air Combat Command (ACC), ensuring the air sovereignty and air defense of the continental United States. As the CONUS geographical component of the bi-national North American Aerospace Defense Command and air component of United States Northern Command (USNORTHCOM), 1 AF also provides airspace surveillance and control and directs all air sovereignty activities for the continental United States.

1 AF primarily consists of Active Guard and Reserve (AGR) and Air Reserve Technician (ART) personnel of the Air National Guard (ANG), augmented by additional part-time "traditional" Air National Guard and Air Force Reserve personnel, as well as active duty personnel of the U.S. Air Force, U.S. Navy, U.S. Marine Corps, U.S. Army, and U.S. Coast Guard. Operationally-gained by ACC, 1 AF is the only Numbered Air Force in the Air National Guard and is responsible for all Air National Guard F-15 and F-16 fighter units.

=== 53d Weapons Evaluation Group ===
The 53d Weapons Evaluation Group (53 WEG), is an Air Combat Command tenant organization that reports to the 53d Wing (53 WG) at nearby Eglin Air Force Base. Among its subordinate squadrons at Tyndall, the 53 WEG manages offshore weapons ranges over the eastern Gulf of Mexico (EGOMEX), manages target drone programs ranging from sub-scale target drones to a fleet of QF-16 Fighting Falcon Full Scale Aerial Targets (FSAT) based on conversion of older F-16A and F-16C aircraft. The 53 WEG previously managed QF-4 Phantom II FSATs, most of which were converted F-4E and F-4G aircraft. The 53 WEG also serves as primary manager for "William Tell", a biennial air-to-air weapons and aerial gunnery meet and competition for fighter aircraft held by the United States Air Force during even-numbered years.

=== Other organizations ===
125th Student Flight, Florida Air National Guard

The 125th Student Flight is a training unit based out of Jacksonville, Florida. Established in 2018, the Tyndall AFB detachment of the 125th serves as a holding unit for Florida Air National Guard trainees. Once enlisted, Air Guardsmen awaiting basic training and tech school will be sent to the Student Flight detachment nearest to their home. The Tyndall detachment is located on a separate compound within the main air base, where instructors teach recruits basic skills and knowledge regarding the Air Force and the Florida Air National Guard.

==== 337th Air Control Squadron ====
The 337th Air Control Squadron (337 ACS) is a Geographically Separate Unit (GSU) of the 33d Operations Group, 33d Fighter Wing, at Eglin AFB, Florida. As an Air Education and Training Command (AETC) unit, the 337 ACS conducts Undergraduate Air Battle Manager Training (UABMT) at Tyndall AFB. All of the Air Force's Air Battle Managers are initially trained at Tyndall prior to proceeding to Tinker AFB, Oklahoma for actual positional training in the E-3 Sentry AWACS aircraft or Robins AFB, Georgia for the E-8 Joint STARS aircraft.

==== Air Force Civil Engineer Center ====
Prior to October 2012, Tyndall AFB was home to the Air Force Civil Engineer Support Agency (AFCESA). Following AFCESA's merger with the Air Force Center for Engineering and the Environment and Air Force Real Property Agency, it was renamed the Air Force Civil Engineer Center (AFCEC), but AFCEC headquarters remained with the other two previous activities which had relocated from the former Brooks AFB to Lackland AFB, part of Joint Base San Antonio, Texas. As a tenant unit at Tyndall, AFCEC is a subordinate unit of the Air Force Materiel Command (AFMC). Its activities at Tyndall include the AFCEC Energy Directorate, Operations Directorate and Readiness and Emergency Management Directorate.

==== Air Force Research Laboratory ====
The Air Force Research Laboratory's Materials and Manufacturing Directorate at Wright-Patterson AFB, Ohio maintains a research facility at Tyndall as a Geographically Separate Unit.

== Based units ==
Flying and notable non-flying units based at Tyndall Air Force Base.

Units marked GSU are Geographically Separate Units, which although based at Tyndall are subordinate to a parent unit based at another location.

=== United States Air Force ===
Air Combat Command (ACC)

- Fifteenth Air Force
  - 325th Fighter Wing (Host Wing)
    - Headquarters 325th Fighter Wing
    - 325th Comptroller Squadron
    - 325th Operations Group
      - 2nd Fighter Training Squadron – T-38A/B/C Talon
      - 43rd Fighter Squadron – F-22A Raptor
      - 95th Fighter Squadron – F-35A Lightning II
      - 325th Operations Support Squadron
      - 325th Training Support Squadron
    - 325th Maintenance Group
      - 325th Aircraft Maintenance Squadron
      - 325th Maintenance Squadron
    - 325th Medical Group
      - 325th Aerospace Medicine Squadron
      - 325th Medical Operations Squadron
      - 325th Medical Support Squadron
    - 325th Mission Support Group
      - 325th Civil Engineer Squadron
      - 325th Communications Squadron
      - 325th Contracting Squadron
      - 325th Force Support Squadron
      - 325th Logistics Readiness Squadron
      - 325th Security Forces Squadron
  - 800th Red Horse Group
    - 801st Red Horse Squadron (GSU)
- First Air Force
  - Headquarters First Air Force
  - 601st Air and Space Operations Center
  - 702nd Computer Systems Squadron & System Support Facility
  - Air Force National Security Emergency Preparedness Directorate
  - Air Force Rescue Coordination Center
- US Air Force Warfare Center
  - 53rd Wing
    - 53rd Electronic Warfare Group
      - 16th Electronic Warfare Squadron
        - Detachment 1 (GSU)
    - 53rd Weapons Evaluation Group (GSU)
      - 53rd Test Support Squadron
      - 81st Range Control Squadron
      - 82nd Aerial Targets Squadron – BQM-34 Firebee, BQM-167 Streaker,
        E-9A Widget, QF-16A/C Fighting Falcon
      - 83rd Fighter Weapons Squadron

Air Education and Training Command (AETC)

- Second Air Force
  - 82nd Training Wing
    - 982nd Training Group
      - 372nd Training Squadron
        - Detachment 4 (GSU)
- Nineteenth Air Force
  - 33rd Fighter Wing
    - 33rd Operations Group
      - 337th Air Control Squadron (GSU)

Air Force Materiel Command (AFMC)

- Air Force Installation and Mission Support Center
  - Air Force Civil Engineer Center (GSU)
    - Energy Directorate
    - Operations Directorate
    - Readiness and Emergency Management Directorate
- Air Force Research Laboratory
  - Materials and Manufacturing Directorate
    - Research Facility (GSU)

Air Force Reserve Command (AFRC)

- Tenth Air Force
  - 301st Fighter Wing
    - 44th Fighter Group (GSU)
      - 301st Fighter Squadron – F-35 Lightning II

Air National Guard (ANG)

- Florida Air National Guard
  - Headquarters Florida Air National Guard
    - Detachment 1 (GSU)
  - 101st Air and Space Operations Group
    - 101st Air Communications Squadron

== Geography and demographics ==
=== Geography ===
According to the United States Census Bureau, the base has a total area of 14.5 square miles (37.6 km^{2}). 14.5 square miles (37.5 km^{2}) of it is land, and 0.077 square miles (0.2 km^{2}) of it (0.44%) is water.

=== Demographics ===
Historical population
Census	Pop.	Note	%±
1970	4,248		—
1980	4,542		6.9%
1990	4,318		−4.9%
2000	2,757		−36.2%
2010	2,994		8.6%
2020	139		−95.4%

The base is delineated as the Tyndall AFB census-designated place (CDP) and recorded a population of 139 at the 2020 census, a 95% reduction in population from 2,994 at the 2010 census. It is part of the Panama City, Florida metropolitan area.

As of the 2000 census, 2,757 people, 663 households, and 653 families resided on the base. The population density was 73.1/km^{2} (189.2/mi^{2}). There were 663 housing units at an average density of 17.6/km^{2} (45.5/mi^{2}). The racial makeup of the base was 77.8% White, 14.2% Black or African American, 0.5% Native American, 3.1% Asian, <0.1% Pacific Islander, 2.8% from other races, and 4.6% from two or more races. Hispanic or Latino of any race were 8.3% of the population.

There were 663 households, out of which 81.0% had children under the age of 18 living with them, 90.8% were married couples living together, 5.1% had a female householder with no husband present, and 1.4% were non-families. 1.2% of all households were made up of individuals, and 0.2% had someone living alone who was 65 years of age or older. The average household size was 3.57 and the average family size was 3.59.

On the base the population was spread out, with 37.9% under the age of 18, 17.5% from 18 to 24, 42.4% from 25 to 44, 2.1% from 45 to 64, and 0.1% who were 65 years of age or older. The median age was 22 years. For every 100 females, there were 121.1 males. For every 100 females age 18 and over, there were 130.7 males.

The median income for a household in the base was $34,191, and the median income for a family was $33,897. Males had a median income of $25,857 versus $19,821 for females. The per capita income for the base was $11,281. About 3.8% of families and 3.6% of the population were below the poverty line, including 5.3% of those under age 18 and none of those age 65 or over.

== Accidents and incidents ==
- On 22 March 2003, a Techno Avia SP-95 crashed at the Tyndall Air Force Base. The probable cause of the accident was found to be the pilot's attempted abrupt maneuver at a low altitude, resulting in loss of control and collision with terrain before control could be regained.
- On 25 February 2021, a Mirage F-1B fighter jet of Airborne Tactical Advantage Company (ATAC) crashed at the base after sliding off one of the base's runways. Both pilots were taken to a Panama City hospital with non-life threatening injuries.

== Education ==
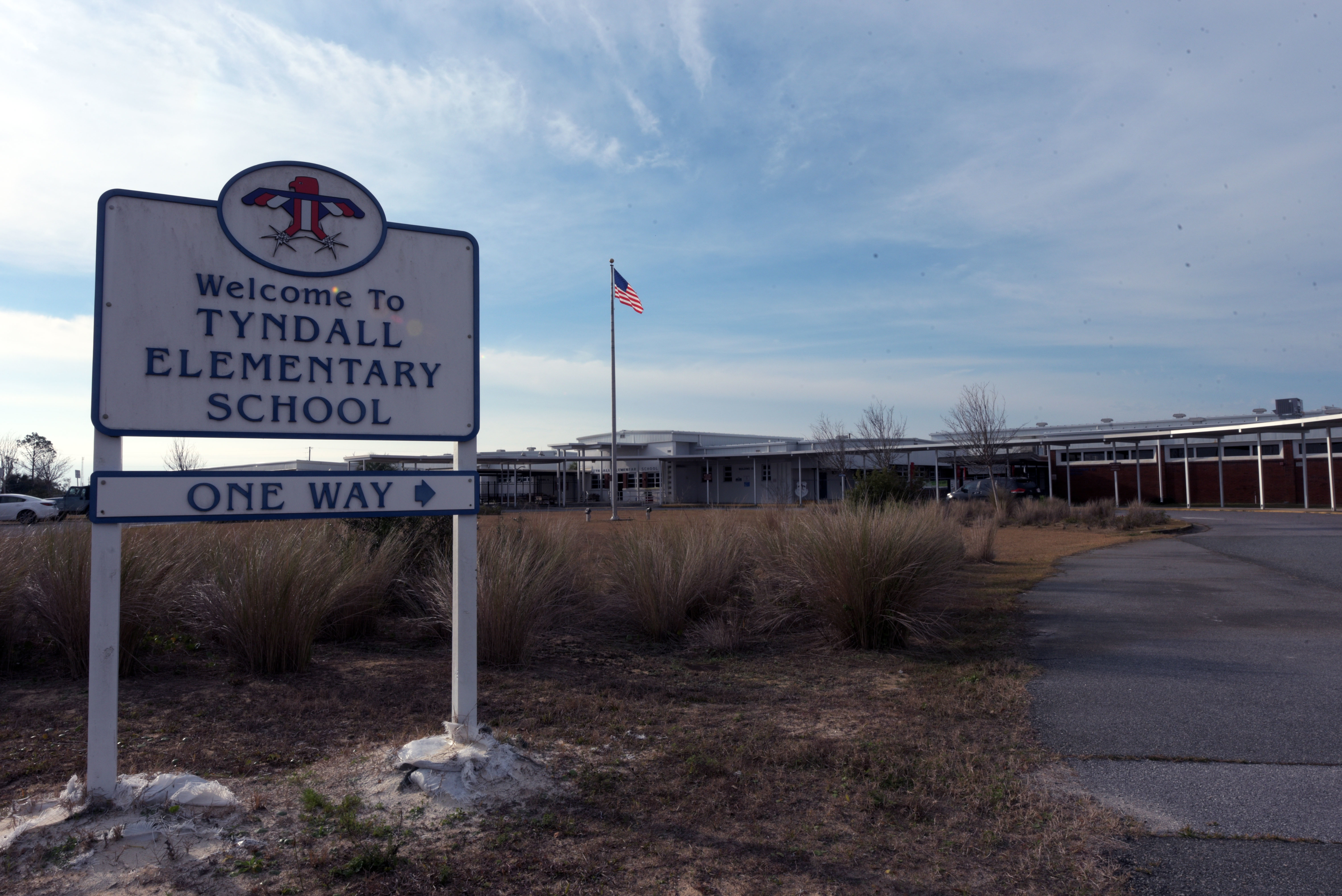
Tyndall Elementary School, a.k.a. Tyndall Academy

Bay District Schools operates area public schools. Tyndall Academy (also known as Tyndall Elementary School) is a K-8 school on the base property. The zoned high school is Rutherford High School.

Previously Tyndall was elementary only, while Rosenwald Middle School included middle school grades.

== See also ==
- Florida World War II Army Airfields
- 75th Flying Training Wing (World War II)
- List of USAF Aerospace Defense Command General Surveillance Radar Stations

Other U.S. Air Force bases significantly damaged by natural disasters:

- Clark Air Base – extensive damage by lahars during eruption of Mount Pinatubo (1991)
- Homestead Air Force Base – significantly damaged by Hurricane Andrew (1992), a Category 5 at landfall
- Shaw Air Force Base – significantly damaged by Hurricane Hugo (1989), during which it recorded a 109 mph wind gust
- Airborne Tactical Advantage Company

== General references ==
- Manning, Thomas A. (2005), History of Air Education and Training Command, 1942–2002. Office of History and Research, Headquarters, AETC, Randolph AFB, Texas OCLC 71006954, 29991467
- Shaw, Frederick J. (2004), Locating Air Force Base Sites, History’s Legacy, Air Force History and Museums Program, United States Air Force, Washington DC. OCLC 57007862, 1050653629
