= Silver Flag =

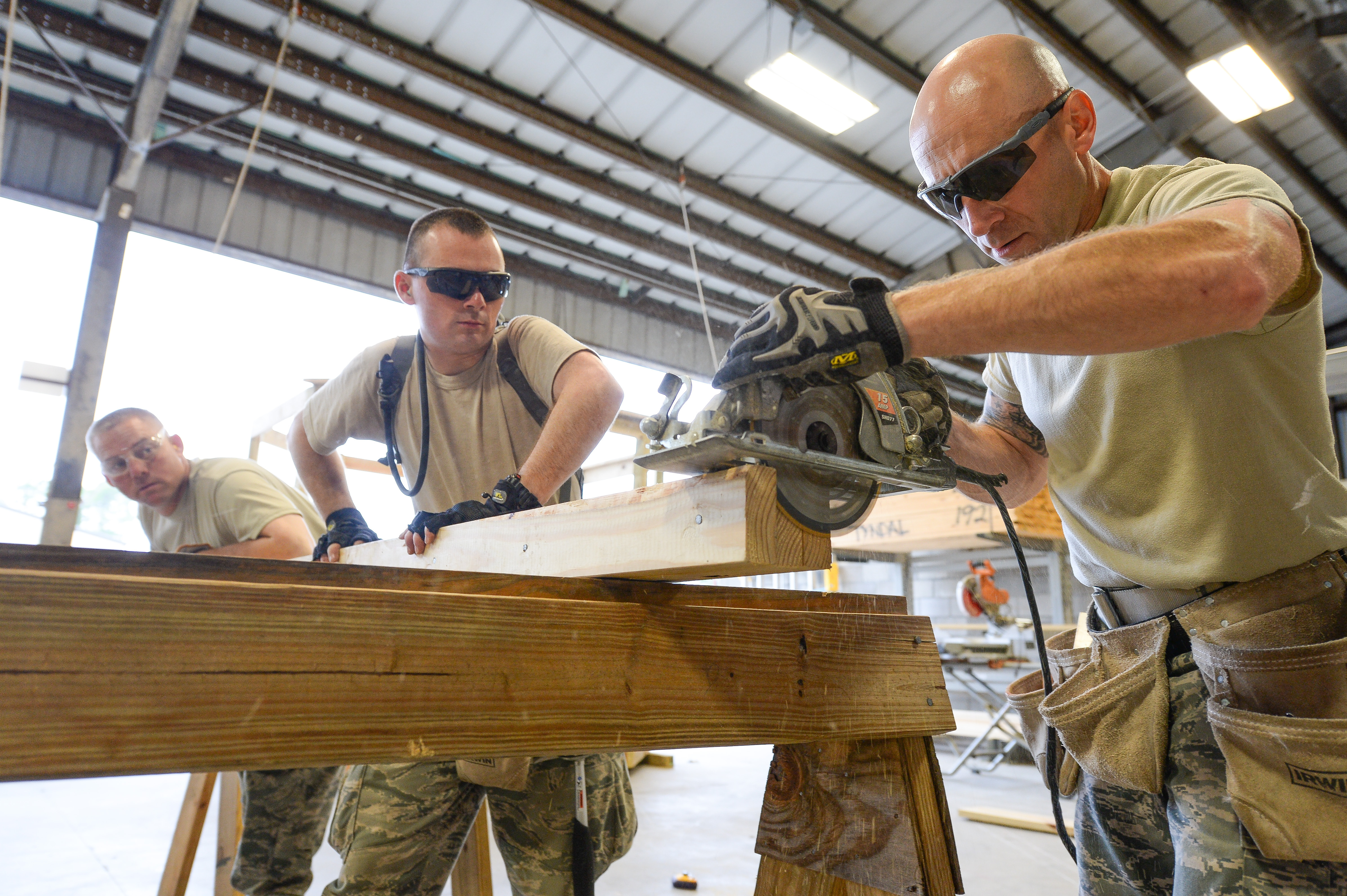
Airmen practice setting up base infrastructure during a Silver Flag exercise at Tyndall Air Force Base in 2014

Silver Flag training exercise provides United States Air Force Civil Engineers with a training venue in a contingency environment that focuses on hands-on technical experience with high-demand, contingency tools and equipment generally not available at home station. The standardized curriculum is managed through the Air Force Civil Engineer Center (AFCEC).

Silver Flag training exercise focuses on bare base beddown, sustainment operations and recovery after an attack. The following elements are part of the training covered during Silver Flag:

- Base Expeditionary Airfield Resources (BEAR), Reverse Osmosis Water Purification Unit (ROWPU), Mobile Aircraft Arresting System (MAAS), Emergency Airfield Lighting System (EALS) and High voltage power generation and distribution systems.
- Airfield Damage Repair (ADR).
- Firefighting, CBRN Management/Response and Explosive Ordnance Disposal (EOD).

Silver Flag is available at three USAF training sites:

- 801st RED HORSE Training Squadron, Tyndall Air Force Base, USA
- 554th RED HORSE Squadron, Andersen Air Force Base, Guam
- 435th Construction and Training Squadron, Ramstein Air Base, Germany
