= Air battle manager =

US Air Force rated officer position

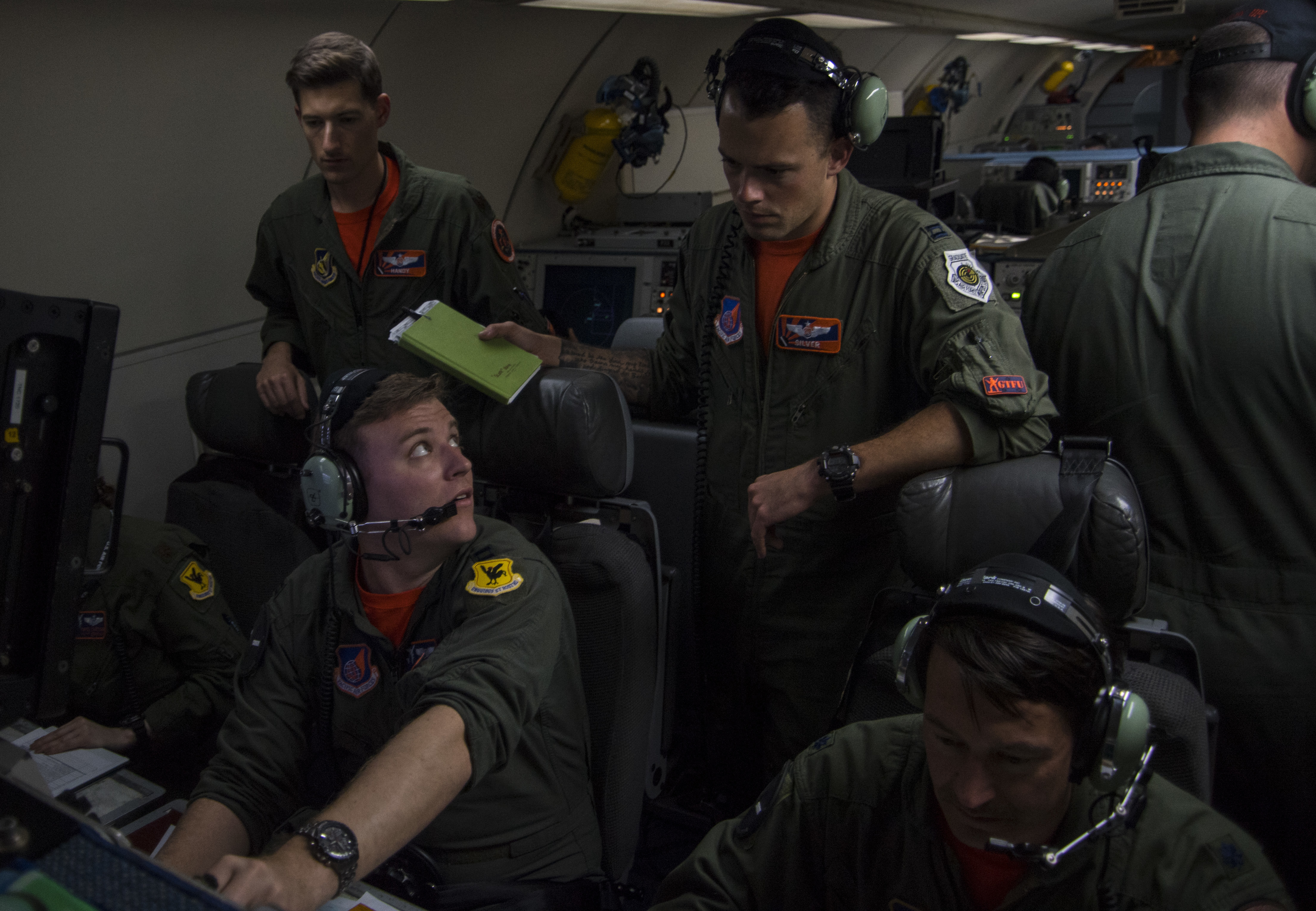
Air battle managers on the AWACS

Air battle manager (ABM) is an aeronautically rated officer career field in the United States Air Force that provides command and control capability to airborne and ground units. The Air Force Specialty Code for ABM is 13B and it officially became the USAF's fourth line officer aeronautical rating after pilots (AFSC 11XX), combat systems officers (AFSC 12XX, formerly known as navigators), and USAF astronauts (AFSC 13AX, nearly all of whom are previously aeronautically rated 11XXs or 12XXs) in 1999.

== Training ==
Air battle manager wings

Undergraduate air battle manager training for active U.S. Air Force, Air Force Reserve, and Air National Guard officers is a 6-month course conducted by the 337th Air Control Squadron at Tyndall Air Force Base, Florida. Following training, graduates will advance to flying in the E-3 AWACS aircraft or ground positions within control and reporting centers, battle control centers, or air operations centers.

== Responsibilities ==
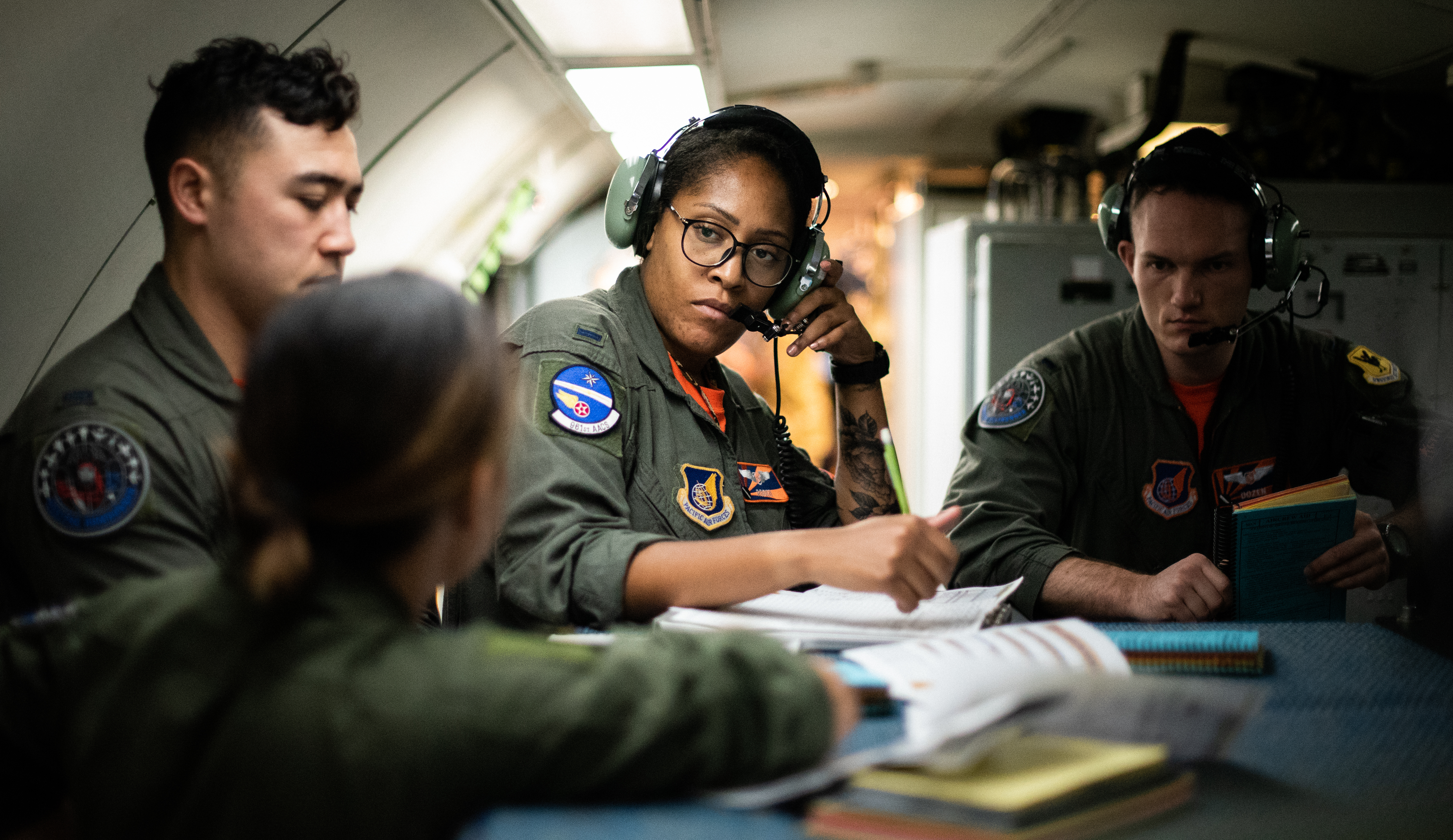
ABMs aboard the E-3 Sentry prior to takeoff.

The responsibilities of air battle managers differ depending on the platform to which they are assigned. On the E-3 AWACS, their job is to provide tactical command and control and battle management to friendly aircraft in both air-to-air and air-to-ground engagements, as well as providing long-range surveillance of aircraft and radar emitters. ABMs assigned to the E-8 JSTARS provide battle management using radar surveillance of moving and stationary targets on the ground. ABMs assigned to the control and reporting center provide air-to-air surveillance and control for friendly aircraft. ABMs assigned to the four NORAD battle control centers located in the United States provide homeland air defense. In addition, the Hawaii Air Defense Sector also provides homeland air defense of the United States. In addition, USAF ABMs assigned to battle control centers serve in NORAD's Canadian Air Defense Sector and the Pacific Air Forces battle control center located in South Korea.
