= 33rd Fighter Wing =

US Air Force training unit

33rd Fighter Wing

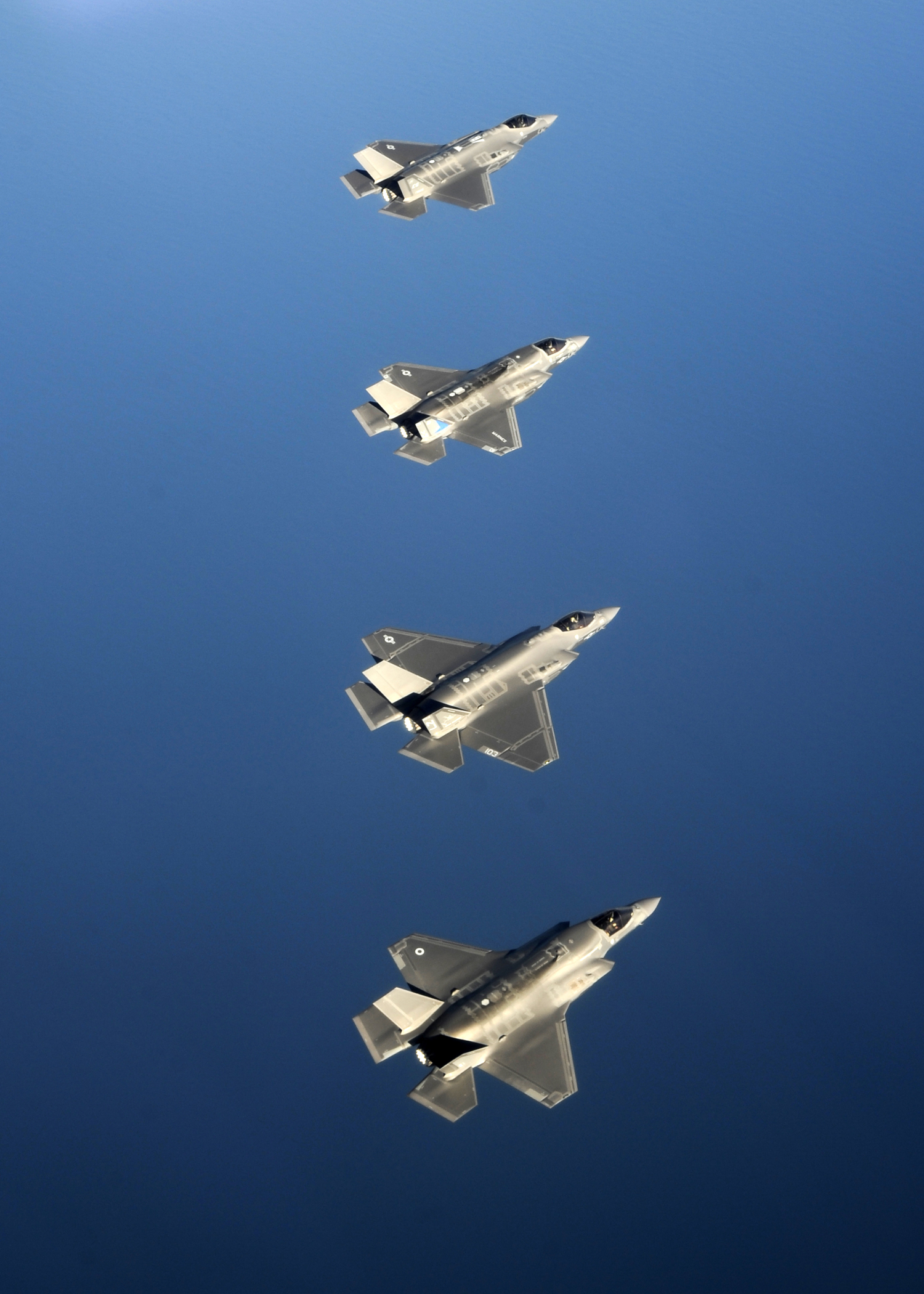
- RAF, USAF, USMC and USN F-35s in May 2014
- Active: 1947–1952; 1956–1957; 1965–present
- Country: United States
- Branch: United States Air Force
- Part of: Air Combat Command
- Garrison/HQ: Eglin Air Force Base
- Nickname: Nomads
- Motto: Fire From the Clouds
- Engagements: Operation Urgent Fury; Southwest Asia
- Decorations: Air Force Outstanding Unit Award
- Website: 33fw.af.mil

Commanders
- Current commander: Colonel Nicholas Lofthouse
- Vice Commander: Colonel Jordan G. Grant
- Command Chief: Chief Master Sergeant Kelvin J. Hatcher
- Notable commanders: Carrol Chandler; John P. Jumper; William R. Looney III; Gregory S. Martin

Insignia
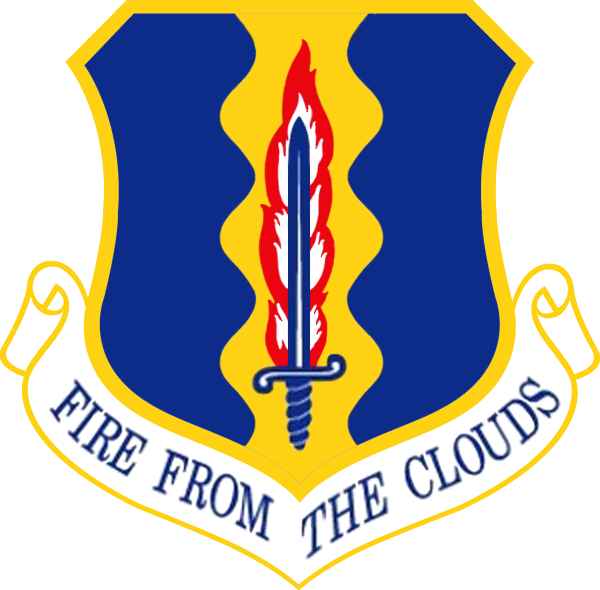
- 33rd Fighter Wing emblem (approved 5 October 1965)

The 33rd Fighter Wing, sometimes written 33d Fighter Wing, (33 FW) is a United States Air Force unit assigned to Air Combat Command's Fifteenth Air Force. It is stationed at Eglin Air Force Base, Florida where it is a tenant unit.

The 33 FW is an ACC unit. Its main mission is to train United States Air Force and partner nation pilots and maintainers on the Lockheed Martin F-35 Lightning II. When the wing was initially assigned the F-35 training mission on 1 October 2009 it was to include USN/USMC F-35C and USMC F-35B training as well as USAF F-35A and international partner training. Navy squadron VFA-101 was assigned to the wing to conduct F-35C training and USMC squadron VMFAT-501 to conduct F-35B training. In July 2014 VMFAT-501 was detached from the 33rd Fighter Wing and reassigned to Marine Aircraft Group 31 (MAG-31) at MCAS Beaufort, SC ending the USMC presence in the wing. In December 2017 the USN reactivated VFA-125 at NAS Lemoore, CA under Strike Fighter Wing Pacific Fleet to conduct F-35C training for the USN and USMC. On 1 July 2019 VFA-101 was deactivated ending the USN presence in the 33rd Fighter Wing.

Prior to its assignment as a training wing, while still an operational fighter wing, following the 11 September 2001 attacks, the Nomads provided armed over-watch throughout North America for Operation Noble Eagle, securing two presidents of the United States, multiple Space Shuttle launches and other high-visibility events. The 33rd Fighter Wing closed its operations with the F-15 Eagle in September 2009 and became the Department of Defense's first F-35 Lightning II training wing on 1 October 2009.

== Subordinate organizations ==
The wing is composed of three groups, the 33d Operations Group (OG), 33d Maintenance Group (MXG) and 85th Fighter Group. The 33 OG operates two flying squadron, the 58th Fighter Squadron and 60th Fighter Squadron, the 33d Operations Support Squadron as well as the 728th and 337th Air Control Squadrons. The 33 MXG commands the 33d Maintenance Operations Squadron, the 33d Aircraft Maintenance Squadron, the 33d Maintenance Squadron.

- 33d Operations Group
  - 58th Fighter Squadron
  - 60th Fighter Squadron
  - 728th Air Control Squadron
  - 337th Air Control Squadron, located at Tyndall Air Force Base
  - 33d Operations Support Squadron
- 85th Fighter Group, located at Ebbing Air National Guard Base
  - 57th Fighter Squadron
- 33d Maintenance Group
  - 33d Aircraft Maintenance Squadron
  - 33d Maintenance Operations Squadron
  - 33d Maintenance Squadron

== History ==
See 33rd Operations Group for related lineage and history.

=== Air Defense ===
The headquarters of the 33rd Fighter Wing became operational upon movement to Otis Air Force Base, Massachusetts, in mid-November 1948. The wing trained to maintain tactical proficiency and participated in exercises and aerial demonstrations from November 1948 to November 1949. It assumed an air defense mission in December 1949 and provided air defense in the northeastern United States until inactivated in February 1952, when it was inactivated and most personnel were transferred to the 4707th Air Defense Wing. Once again it provided air defense in the northeastern United States, from October 1956 to June 1957, but was non-operational from 1 July 1957 to 18 August 1957.

=== Tactical fighter operations ===
On 1 April 1965, the wing was activated at Eglin Air Force Base, Florida and embarked on a program of tactical training operations to maintain proficiency. It operated a test support division, from July 1965 to December 1967, and a special test squadron, from December 1967 to April 1971, in support of tests for weapon systems, aircraft armament and munitions, and tactical procedures of the Tactical Air Warfare Center. The first Tactical Air Command McDonnell F-4D Phantom IIs assigned to a combat unit arrived at the 33rd at Eglin on 21 June 1966. The wing also provided F-4 replacement training from 15 December 1966 to 28 February 1967. Through deployment of combat-ready tactical components, with personnel and equipment transferred to Pacific Air Forces (PACAF) units upon arrival, the wing provided fresh aircraft and aircrews for the forces in Southeast Asia and in Korea. The wing also transferred two of its combat-ready squadrons to PACAF, the 25th Tactical Fighter Squadron in May 1968 and the 4th Tactical Fighter Squadron in April 1969. The wing's last combat-ready squadron, the 58th Tactical Fighter Squadron, deployed to Southeast Asia for combat operations from April to October 1972 and again from June to September 1973.

The wing supported the 4485th Test Squadron of the Tactical Air Warfare Center in weapon systems evaluation program tests from January to December 1973, and periodically thereafter until July 1978. Aircrews ferried F-4Es to Israel in October 1973. The wing augmented intercept defense forces of the North American Air Defense Command (NORAD) from 1 January 1976 to 15 January 1979 and from 4 January 1982 to 5 April 1982. While awaiting delivery of McDonnell Douglas F-15 Eagles, the 60th Fighter Squadron conducted F-15 mission qualifications training for the 18th Tactical Fighter Wing (Kadena Air Base, Japan) from 15 July 1979 to 30 April 1980. The wing provided personnel and equipment to fly combat air patrols and air intercept missions for contingency operations in Grenada, from October to November 1983, and Panama, from December 1989 to January 1990.

=== Recent operations ===
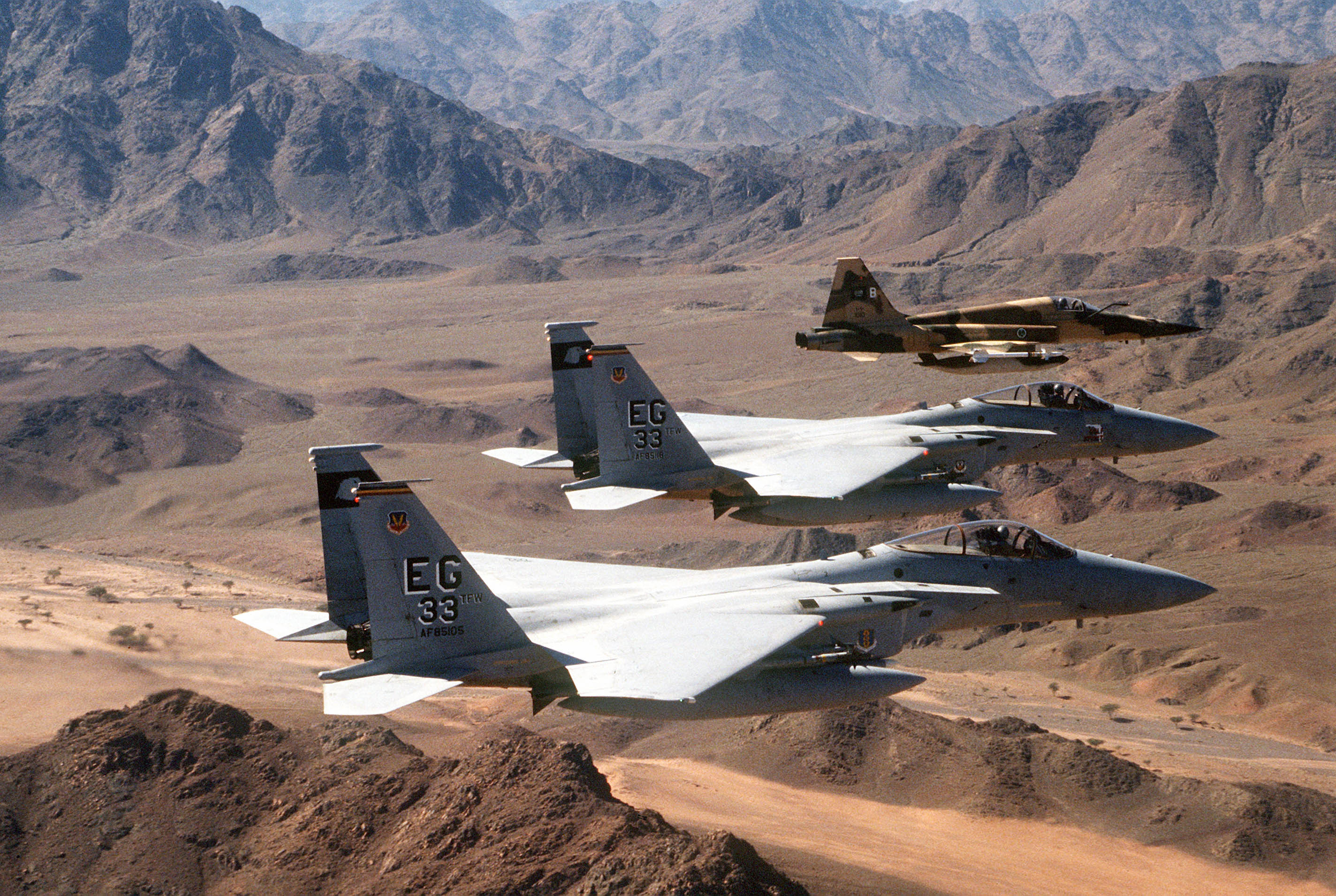
An air-to-air view of two U.S. Air Force F-15C Eagle fighter aircraft from the 33rd Tactical Fighter Wing, Eglin Air Force Base, Florida, and a Royal Saudi Air Force F-5E Tiger II fighter aircraft during an Operation Desert Storm mission.

During combat operations while deployed in Southwest Asia from 26 August 1990 to 12 April 1991, 33 FW personnel were credited with sixteen air-to-air victories. Wing personnel and aircraft continued rotations to Saudi Arabia to protect coalition assets and to ensure that Iraq complied with treaty terms.

From 1992 to 2002 the 33rd Operations Group continued to deploy aircraft and personnel to Saudi Arabia, Canada, the Caribbean, South America, Jamaica, Iceland, Italy, and Puerto Rico and participated in various operations. Twelve of the 19 airmen killed in the Khobar Towers bombing in Saudi Arabia on 25 June 1996 were members of the 33rd Wing.

The 33rd Fighter Wing divested itself of its F-15C and F-15D Eagle aircraft in 2008 and 2009 and completed the transition from Air Combat Command (ACC) to Air Education and Training Command (AETC) on 1 October 2009. At the same time, it became the first American F-35 Lightning II training unit. On 10 July 2026, the 33rd Fighter Wing returned to Air Combat Command.

On 13 January 2011, the 33rd Fighter Wing received four General Dynamics F-16s from the 56th Fighter Wing at Luke AFB, Arizona. The jets will help establish a "battle rhythm," as the wing stands up the first Joint Training Center for the fifth generation F-35 Joint Strike Fighter. In July 2011, the wing received its first two F-35A Lightning II aircraft.

== Lineage ==
- Established as the 33rd Fighter Wing on 15 October 1947

Organized on 5 November 1947
Redesignated 33rd Fighter-Interceptor Wing on 20 January 1950
Inactivated on 6 February 1952

- Redesignated 33rd Fighter Wing (Air Defense) on 14 September 1956

Activated on 18 October 1956
Inactivated on 18 August 1957

- Redesignated 33rd Tactical Fighter Wing and activated on 9 February 1965 (not organized)

Organized on 1 April 1965

- Redesignated 33rd Fighter Wing on 1 October 1991

=== Assignments ===
- Eighth Air Force, 5 November 1947 (attached to 509th Bombardment Wing, 17 November 1947 – 15 November 1948)
- First Air Force, 1 December 1948 (attached to Eastern Air Defense Force, 10 November 1949 – 31 August 1950, 32d Air Division, 20 February 1950– )
- Eastern Air Defense Force, 1 September 1950 – 6 February 1952 (remained attached to 32d Air Division to 1 February 1952)
- 26th Air Division (Defense), 18 October 1956 (attached to 4622d Air Defense Wing, 18 October 1956 – 7 January 1957)
- Boston Air Defense Sector, 8 January – 18 August 1957
- Tactical Air Command, 9 February 1965 (not organized)
- 836th Air Division, 1 April 1965
- Ninth Air Force, 30 June 1971
- Nineteenth Air Force, October 2009 – July 2026
- Fifteenth Air Force, July 2026 - Present

=== Stations ===
- Roswell Army Air Field (later Walker Air Force Base), New Mexico, 5 November 1947
- Otis Air Force Base, Massachusetts, 16 November 1948 – 6 February 1952
- Otis Air Force Base, Massachusetts, 18 October 1956 – 18 August 1957
- Eglin Air Force Base, Florida, 1 April 1965 – present

=== Components ===
Wing

- 50th Fighter (later, 50th Fighter-Interceptor): attached 1 June 1949 – 2 June 1951

Group

- 33rd Fighter Group (later 33rd Fighter-Interceptor Group, 33rd Fighter Group, 33rd Operations Group): 5 November 1947 – 6 February 1952 (detached until 15 November 1948), 18 October 1956 – 18 August 1957 (detached after 1 July 1957); 1 December 1991 – present

Squadron

- 4th Tactical Fighter Squadron: 20 June 1965 – 12 April 1969
- 16th Tactical Fighter Squadron: 20 June 1965 – 1 November 1970 (detached 27 August – 13 September 1966, 13–31 October 1967, 26 May – 9 September 1970)
- 25th Tactical Fighter Squadron: 20 June 1965 – 28 May 1968
- 40th Tactical Fighter Squadron: 20 June 1965 – 15 October 1970
- 58th Tactical Fighter Squadron: 1 September 1970 – 1 December 1991 (detached 29 April – 14 October 1972, 8 June – 14 September 1973, 8–22 August 1975, 31 January – 14 February 1977; 28 August 1990 – 1 December 1991)
- 59th Tactical Fighter Squadron (later 59th Fighter Squadron): 1 September 1970 – 15 April 1999 (detached 24–29 March 1974)
- 60th Tactical Fighter Squadron (later 60th Fighter Squadron): 1 September 1971 – 1 January 2009
- 133rd Fighter-Interceptor Squadron: attached 21 July 1951 – 6 February 1952
- 786th Tactical Fighter Squadron: 1 April – 20 June 1965
- 787th Tactical Fighter Squadron: 1 April – 20 June 1965
- 788th Tactical Fighter Squadron: 1 April – 20 June 1965
- 789th Tactical Fighter Squadron: 1 April – 20 June 1965
- 4533rd Tactical Training Squadron (Test): 7 December 1967 – 12 April 1971

=== Aircraft ===
- North American F-51 Mustang (1948–1950)
- Republic F-84 Thunderjet (1948–1950)
- North American F-86 Sabre (1950–1952)
- Lockheed F-94 Starfire (1951–1952, 1956–1957)
- Republic F-47 Thunderbolt (1951–1952)
- Northrop F-89 Scorpion (1956–1957)
- McDonnell F-4 Phantom II (1965–1979)
- McDonnell Douglas F-15 Eagle (1978–2009)
- Lockheed Martin F-35 Lightning II (2010–present)
- F-16 Fighting Falcon (2011–2011)
