= Civil Engineer Corps =

Engineering-focused staff corps of the United States Navy

U.S. Navy Civil Engineer Corps
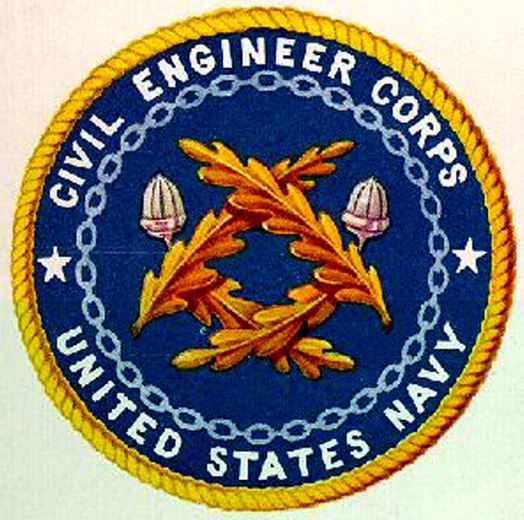
- U.S. Naval Civil Engineer Corps Insignia
- Active: 2 March 1867 – present
- Country: United States of America
- Allegiance: (United States) U.S.
- Branch: U.S. Navy (Active & Reserve Component)
- Type: Staff Corps
- Nickname: Crossed Bananas
- Engagements: Sicily, North Africa, Normandy, Guadalcanal, Bougainville, Kwajalein, Roi-Namur, Battle of Saipan, Tinian, Guam, Tarawa, Peleliu, Philippines, Iwo Jima, Okinawa, Operation Highjump, Korea, Operation Deep Freeze, Vietnam, Iraq, Afghanistan

Commanders
- Chief of Civil Engineers: RADM Dean VanderLey, CEC, USN

The Civil Engineer Corps (CEC) is a staff corps of the United States Navy. CEC officers are professional engineers and architects, acquisitions specialists, and Seabee combat warfare officers who qualify within Seabee units. They are responsible for executing and managing the planning, design, acquisition, construction, operation, and maintenance of the Navy's shore facilities. The Civil Engineer Corps is under the command of the Chief of Civil Engineers and Commander, Naval Facilities Engineering Systems Command. On 12 August 2022, RADM Dean VanderLey relieved RADM John W. Korka, becoming the 46th commander of NAVFAC and Chief of Civil Engineers.

Present day CEC ranks range from CWO4 to RADM, though the community is phasing out Chief Warrant Officer ranks in favor of limited duty officers. Several Civil Engineer Corps officers, primarily those serving during or around the time of World War II, have held the rank of Vice Admiral, and one officer, Ben Moreell, has held the four-star rank of Admiral, but there are no current billets within the US Navy that require Civil Engineer Corps officers of either rank. The worldwide CEC Active- and Reserve-Component authorized end strength is shown below.

Authorized end strength, as of October 2023 (510X, 653X, 753X designators)
	Total	ADM	VADM	RADM	RDML	CAPT	CDR	LCDR	LT	LTJG	ENS	CWO5	CWO4	CWO3	CWO2
Active	1,277	0	0	1	2	80	182	287	398	164	161	1	1	0	0
Reserve	438	0	0	1	1	24	72	144	111	43	42	0	0	0	0
Total	1,715	0	0	2	3	104	254	431	509	207	203	1	1	0	0

== History ==
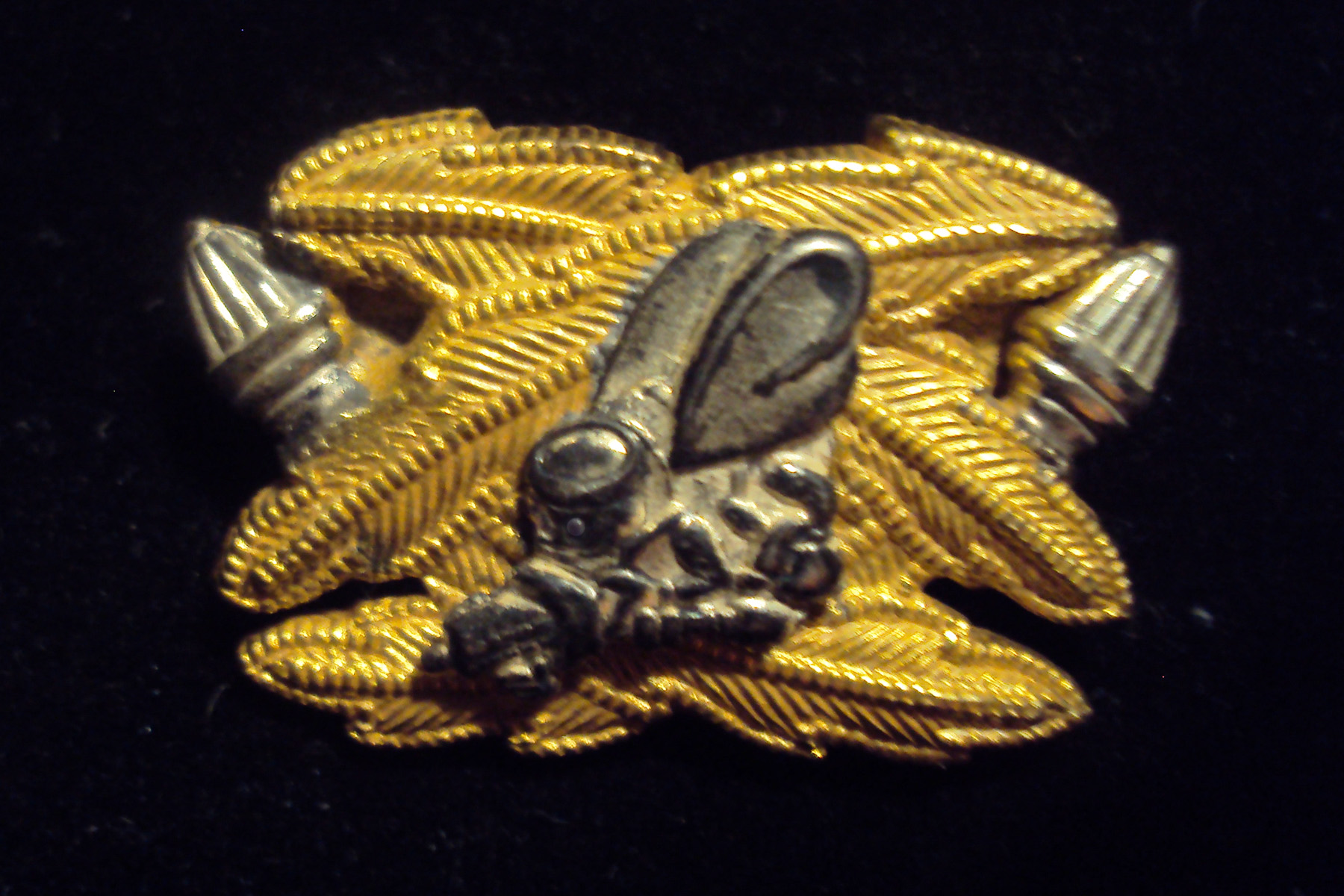
WWII Naval Officers from the Civil Engineer Corps, Medical Corps, Dental Corps and Supply Corps assigned to Naval Construction Battalions had a Silver Seabee on their Corps insignia

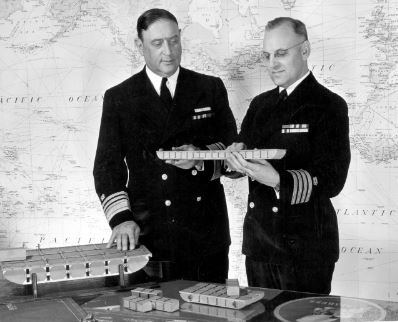
Capt. John N. Laycock (CEC) discussing his modular pontoon box system with Admiral Moreell

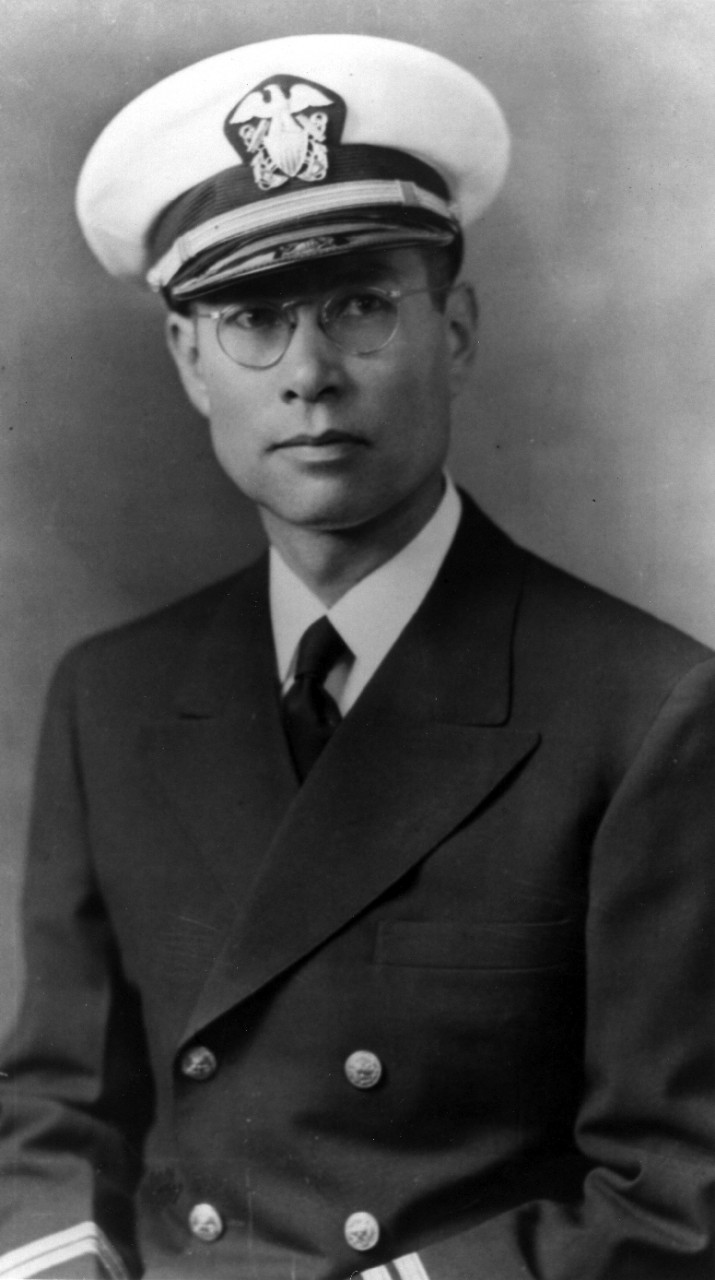
Lt Cmdr. Edward S. Hope CEC was the most senior African American officer in the United States Navy during WWII.

Civil engineers were employed by the Navy Department as early as 1827, when Mr. Loammi Baldwin was appointed to superintendent of the construction of dry docks at Boston and Norfolk. Prior to the passage of the Act of 2 March 1867 civil engineers were appointed by the Secretary, but under authority of that act they were to be commissioned by the President by and with the advice and consent of the Senate; they were appropriated for as part of the civil establishment at the several navy yards and stations under the control of the Bureau of Yards and Docks until 1870. At that time their pay was regulated by section 3 of the Act of 15 July 1870 that "fixed" the annual pay of officers of the Navy on the active list. Appropriations for their pay have been made since 1870 under the head of "Pay of the Navy".

The discretionary authority given to the president by the Statute of 3 March 1871, to determine and fix the relative rank of civil engineers was not exercised until the 24th of February 1881, when relative rank was conferred upon them and fixed as follows: One with the relative rank of captain (Capt), two with that of commander (Cdr), three with that of lieutenant-commander (Lcdr), and four with that of lieutenant (Lt).

The Navy Regulations for 1876 failed to list civil engineers among the staff officers of the Navy, and the uniform regulations for that year did not prescribe a uniform or a corps device for that class of officer. In 1881, after having had relative rank conferred upon them, civil engineers were instructed by Uniform Circular dated 24 August to wear the uniform of officers of the line with whom they had relative rank - omitting the star, but with the distinctive letters C.E. (Old English) embroidered in silver in the center. The same letters to be similarly embroidered on frogs of epaulets.

In 1905, two crossed silver sprigs, each composed of two oak leaves and an acorn (sometimes called "Crossed Bananas"), was adopted as the insignia of the Civil Engineer Corps replacing the Old English letters C.E. These were to be worn on the epaulets, shoulder straps and collar of the service coat. While the pattern of this corps device remained the same, uniform regulations issued in 1919 specified that it was to be embroidered in gold instead of silver and worn on the sleeve of frock, evening dress, and blue service coats, above the gold lace strips, and on shoulder marks for white service coat and overcoat. By these same regulations the light blue cloth worn under the sleeve strips, and worn on the shoulder marks since 1899, was abolished as a distinction of the corps, however is still present in the light blue color of the stripes worn by enlisted, pay grades E-3 and below in the Navy's construction field.

In 1939 the CEC was composed of 126 active officers. By V-J Day that number had grown to only 200. However, there were over 10,000 reservists providing the leadership of the Construction Battalions. In December 1941 Admiral Ben Moreell proposed the creation of three Naval Construction Battalions. A problem then confronted BuDocks, who would command the Construction Battalions? Naval regulations stated that military command of naval personnel was strictly limited to line officers, yet BuDocks deemed it essential that these Construction Battalions be commanded by officers of the Civil Engineer Corp, who were trained in the skills required for construction work. The newly formed Bureau of Naval Personnel (BuPers), successor to the Navy's Bureau of Navigation, strongly opposed this transgression of Naval tradition. Admiral Moreell took the question personally to the Secretary of the Navy, Frank Knox, who, on 19 March 1942, gave authority for officers of the Civil Engineer Corps to exercise military authority over all officers and enlisted men assigned to construction units otherwise known as the Seabees. For those engineers assigned to the Seabees a silver Seabee was mounted to the center of the CEC crossed oak leaves insignia. The Seabee logo incorporated the CEC insignia, with one on each arm of the Seabee, just above each glove.

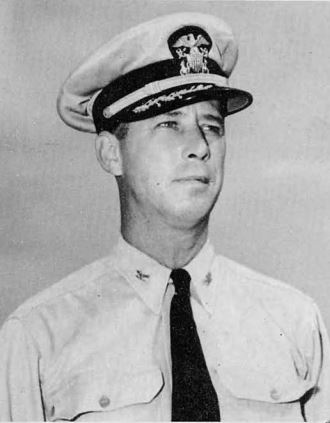
Capt. Brockenbrough (CEC) CB 71, Third Marine Division Shore Party Commander on Bougainville

Besides providing the command leadership and engineering skills needed by the Naval Construction Force (NCF), the CEC made a major contribution to the war effort. CAPT. John N. Laycock created the Seabee's "magic box". Today's Navy lighterage pontoon is a direct descendant of his creation.

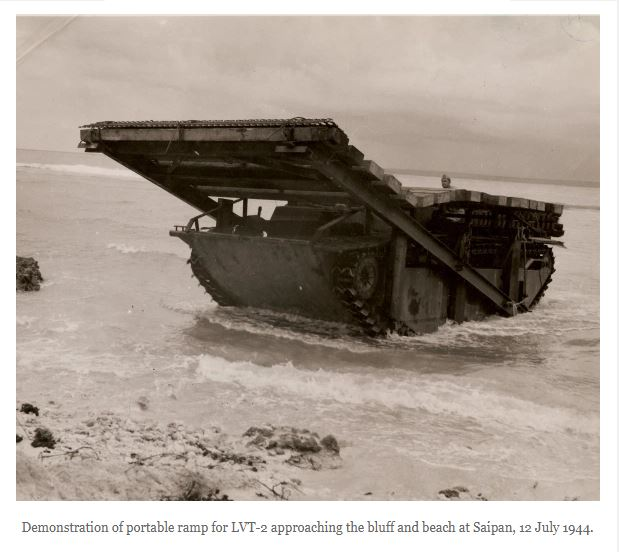
LVT-2 doodlebug going through tests on Saipan. It was a CEC assault concept vehicle.

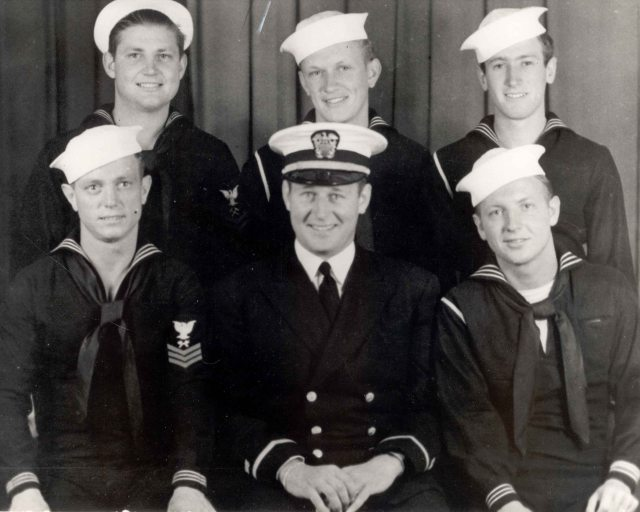
"NCDU 45", Ensign Karnowski CEC Chief Carpenters Mate Conrad C. Millis, MM2 Equipment Operator Lester Meyers and three sailors. The unit received a Presidential Unit Citation with Ens. Karnowski earning the Navy Cross and French Croix de Guerre with Palm, while MM2 Meyers received a Silver Star.

Early in 1943 the Navy began training its first African American officers. In May, Morehouse and MIT graduate Edward S. Hope, was the first to enter the CEC. He went through training at Camp Endicott and was posted as the Public Works officer at Manana Barracks, Hawaii Territory as a Lieutenant. Manana Barracks was the largest "black installation" the U.S. military had. He eventually was promoted to Lieutenant Commander which made him the Navy's highest ranking African American during WWII.

The first CEC killed in Pacific combat were Lt. Irwin W. Lee and Lt. (jg) George W. Stephenson along with 23 enlisted of the 24th CB. They died in an air raid on 2 July 1943 on Rendova Island. The Seabees named their Naval Training Center at Quoddy Village Eastport, Maine, Camp Lee-Stephenson in honor of them.

The first CEC killed in the Atlantic combat was Lt. Carl M. Olson of St Paul, Minnesota, on 10 September 1943 at Salerno, Italy. His design for the landing end of pontoon assemblies was used throughout the war.

- Capt. Wilfred L. Painter (CEC) was awarded four Gold Stars to the Legion of Merit (plus the Combat "V" for each of the additional stars). Lt. Painter received his first award for his leadership in the salvage of the USS California and the USS West Virginia at Pearl Harbor. For the West Virginia Lt. Painter got 120 Seabees from the 16th CB to expedite the operation including pouring 650 tons of marine concrete to seal the hull.

=== USMC ===
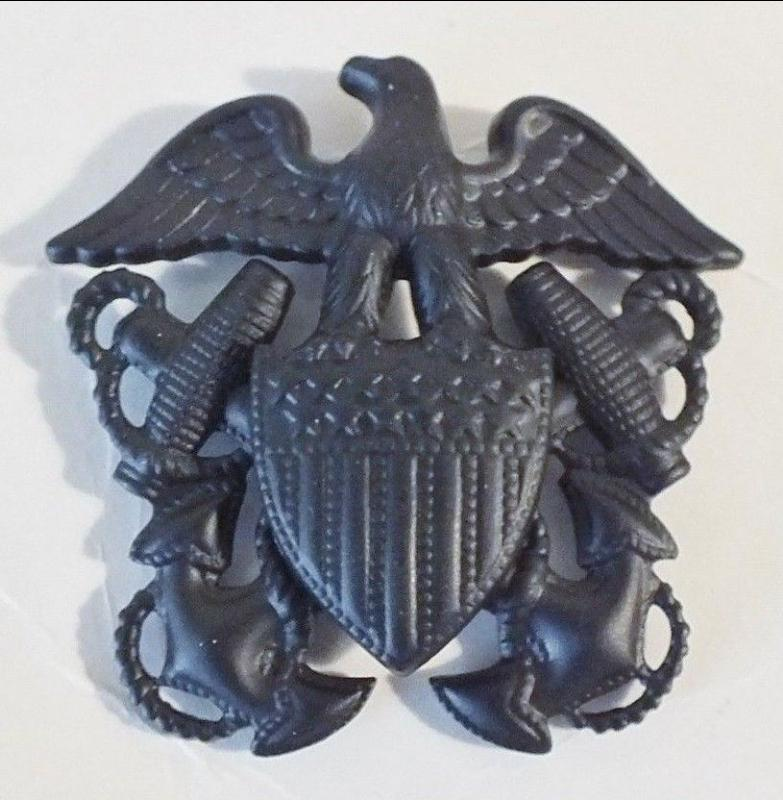
U.S. Naval insignia, brass subdued per USMC regulation for CEC in CBs transferred to the Corps

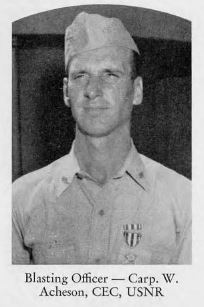
ChCarp. W. H. Achenson (CEC) awarded Silver Star for UDT 1 actions.

During WWII the Seabees had a number of battalions transferred to the Marine Corps. Those battalions were then given USMC designations and the men were given standard Marine Corps issue in addition to their dress naval uniform. For CEC the standard gold and silver officer corps insignia was replaced by a brass subdued one on the garrison hat. The battalions involved were the 18th, 19th, 25th, 53rd and 121st.(see 17th Marine Regiment, 18th Marine Regiment, 19th Marine Regiment, and 20th Marine Regiment) The 31st and 133rd CBs were issued USMC fatigues and attached to the shore parties of the 4th Marine Division and 5th Marine Division for Iwo Jima. The CEC involved would have worn the subdued insignia also. Other battalions were tasked with Marine Corps shore party assignments both prior to and post-Iwo Jima.

Tasked as combat engineers, the CEC of the 18th and 121st CBs designed a detachable ramp mounted on a LVT-2. Its purpose was to enable the Marines to land on Tinian's beaches bordered by coral embankments up to 15 feet high. Ten LVTs were modified using iron beams salvaged from a sugar factory on Saipan. The commanding General Harry Schmidt was skeptical of the design. He ordered that a vehicle test one, a hundred times, before he would use it in combat. The ramps not only stood up, but they allowed the Marines to land where there were no defenses as a landing there had been thought impossible. The astonished Japanese were overwhelmed and outflanked due to the ramps. The LVTs were nicknamed "doodlebugs".

=== USMC Shore party commanders ===
- Guam: 3rd Marine Regiment, Cmdr. Wehlen CEC 3rd Battalion 19th Marines / Naval Construction Battalion 25 beaches Red 1 and Red 2
- Bougainville: 3rd Marine Division Cmdr. Brockenbrough CEC 71st CB with detachments from the 25th, 53rd, and the 75th CBs (and as well as the Marines). beaches: Blue 1,2,3 Yellow 1,2,3,4 Green 1,2 Red 1,2,3
- Iwo Jima: 23rd Marine Regiment Cmdr. Raymond P. Murphy CEC, 133rd CB beaches Yellow 1 and Yellow 2.

=== Naval Combat Demolition Units ===
Operational Naval Demolition Unit No. 1. was the very first USN "demolitions" unit. In early May 1943, a two-phase "Naval Demolition Project" was directed by the Chief of Naval Operations "to meet a present and urgent requirement". The first phase began at Amphibious Training Base (ATB) Solomons, Maryland with the establishment of Operational Naval Demolition Unit No. 1. Six Officers and eighteen enlisted men reported from NTC Camp Peary dynamiting and demolition school, for a four-week course. Those Seabees, led by Lt. Fred Wise CEC, were immediately sent to participate in the invasion of Sicily. When the unit returned to Camp Peary most of the men were assigned to the new Naval Combat Demolition Units being formed there.

Naval Combat Demolition Units were led by junior CEC officers. There were over 200 NCDUs formed with all but five being requisitioned for the UDTs.

=== UDTs ===
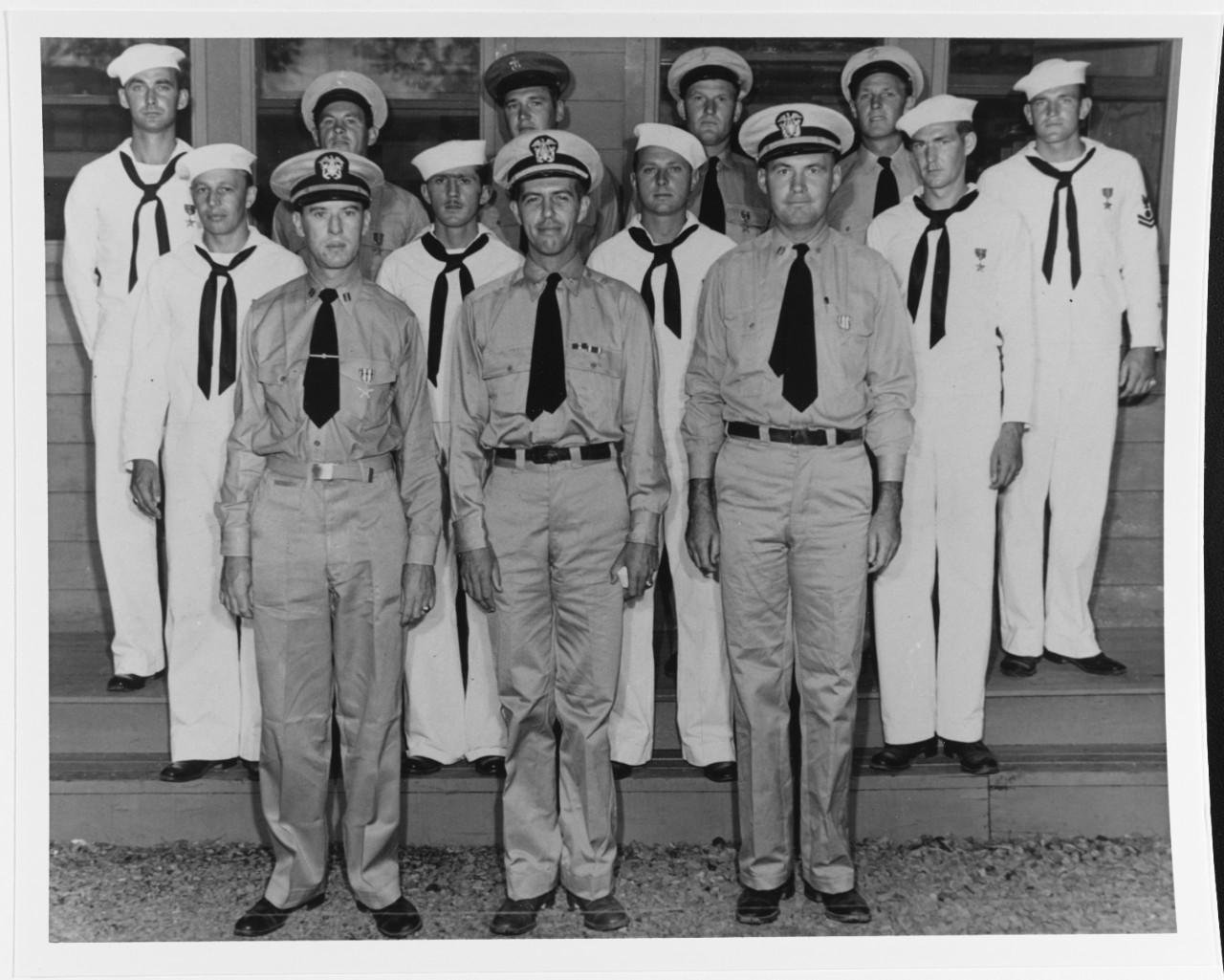
Lt. Crist (CEC), Lt. Cmdr. Kaufmann and Lt. Carberry right to left at awards ceremony

V Amphibious Corps had identified coral as an issue for Amphibious landings in the Pacific and determined Naval Constructions Battalions had the only people with any experience with the material. Lt. Thomas C. Crist CEC, from NCB 10 was in Honolulu from Canton Island where he had been involved in a lagoon coral head clearance project. His being in Pearl Harbor turned out to be pivotal in UDT history. Admiral Turner and V Amphibious Corps were interested in dealing with coral and had identified the Seabees as the only people with any applicable knowledge. The Admirals staff learned of Lt. Crist's presence in Pearl Harbor and ordered him to report. The Admiral commissioned Lt. Crist with developing a method to blast coral under combat conditions and staging qualified men in Pearl to form a unit for that task. Lt. Crist had staged 30 officers and 150 enlisted from the 7th Naval Construction Regiment when the disaster at Tarawa happened. With Kwajalein the next operation, Lt. Crist's 180 men were used to form UDT 1 and UDT 2. Cmdr. E. D. Brewster (CEC) was selected to command UDT 1 and Lt Crist was picked for UDT 2. That did not last as Admiral Connelly wanted a commander with combat experience. So, Lt. Crist was made ops officer for team 2. At Kwajalein Ensign L. Leuhrs and Carp. W. Acheson CEC anticipated that they may not to get the intel Admiral Turner wanted just paddling a dinghy and wore swim trunks under their fatigues. They decided to strip down and go in the water in broad daylight on a hostile beach to get what the Admiral wanted. Doing that changed the UDT mission model and made them the predecessors of the Navy's special ops. Upon returning to Hawaii Lt. Crist was named as the first Training Officer of the UDT program. He was in the position only a short time when he was selected as commander of UDT 3. For the Marianas operations of Kwajelein, Roi-Namur, Siapan, Tinian, Eniwetok, and Guam. Admiral Turner recommended sixty silver stars and over three hundred bronze stars with Vs for the Seabees and others of UDTs 1–7, which was unprecedented in U.S. Naval and Marine Corps history. For UDTs 5 and 7 every officer received a silver star and all the enlisted received bronze stars with Vs for Operation Forager (Tinian). For UDTs 3 and 4 every officer received a silver star and all the enlisted received bronze stars with Vs for Operation Forager (Guam). Admiral Richard Lansing Conolly felt the commanders of teams 3 and 4 (Lt. Crist and Lt. W.G. Carberry) should have received Navy Crosses. When UDT 3 returned from Leyte in November 1944 it became the training instructors of the Maui school and Lt. Crist was made base Training Officer again. The team would remain in these jobs until April 1945 when it was sent to Fort Pierce to do the same job there. Lt. Crist had been promoted to Lt. Cmdr. and was sent back to Hawaii but his Team 3 Seabees would train teams 12–22.

Diving masks were not common in 1944 and a few men had tried using goggles at Kwajalein. They were a rare item in the Hawaiian sports stores so Lt. Crist and Seabee Chief Howard Roeder and put in a request to the Supply Corps for them. Fortuitously, a diving mask ad was spotted in a magazine. That prompted a priority dispatch to the States appropriating the store's entire stock.

In 1944 the Navy created an unheralded program to dredge harbors to increase accessibility and stevedoring productivity at advance bases. The 301st CB was created for the job and given two ex-NCDU (CEC) and two ex-UDT (CEC) to assist. Between them they had three Silver Stars and a Bronze Star for valor.

=== Prisoners of war ===
During WWII fifteen CEC were taken as prisoners of war. All were in the Pacific and all were taken at the onset of hostilities at Cavite, Philippines, Wake, and Guam. Six would die: one executed, two from friendly fire, and three from mal-treatment. One POW, Lt. Jerry Steward CEC, received the Navy Cross, Purple Heart with three gold stars, Army Distinguished Unit Citation with Oak leaf cluster, Philippine Distinguished Service Star and was the most decorated CEC officer of WWII. Postwar he retired as a rear admiral.

== Camp David ==
The presidential retreat is officially Naval Support Facility Thurmont. The CEC staffs the base command. The Marine Corps provides base security while Seabees oversee base operations and maintenance. The current base commander is Capt. Christopher S. Casne (CEC) while the executive officer is Lcdr. Christopher L. Adcock (CEC).

- The Naval Special Warfare Command building at the U.S.N. Seal base at Fort Pierce is named for LTJG Frank Kaine CEC commander of NCDU 2.

== Chiefs of Civil Engineers ==
No.	Portrait	Chief of Civil Engineer	Took office	Left office	Time in office	Command	Chief of Naval Operations
47	Jeff Kilian	RADM; Jeff Kilian	15 August 2025	Incumbent	1 year, 68 days	Naval Facilities Engineering Systems Command	Daryl Caudle
46	Dean VanderLey	RADM; Dean VanderLey	12 August 2022	15 August 2025	3 years, 3 days	Naval Facilities Engineering Systems Command	Michael M. Gilday; Lisa Franchetti
45	John W. Korka	RADM; John W. Korka	19 October 2018	12 August 2022	3 years, 297 days	Naval Facilities Engineering Systems Command	John M. Richardson; Michael M. Gilday
44	Bret J. Muilenburg	RADM; Bret J. Muilenburg	4 November 2015	19 October 2018	2 years, 349 days	Naval Facilities Engineering Command	John M. Richardson
43	Katherine L. Gregory	RADM; Katherine L. Gregory	26 October 2012	4 November 2015	3 years, 9 days	Naval Facilities Engineering Command	Jonathan Greenert; John M. Richardson
42	Christopher J. Mossey	RADM; Christopher J. Mossey	21 May 2010	26 October 2012	2 years, 158 days	Naval Facilities Engineering Command	Gary Roughead; Jonathan Greenert
41	Wayne "Greg" Shear	RADM; Wayne "Greg" Shear	27 October 2006	21 May 2010	3 years, 206 days	Naval Facilities Engineering Command	Michael Mullen; Gary Roughead
40	Michael K. Loose	RADM; Michael K. Loose	24 October 2003	27 October 2006	3 years, 3 days	Naval Facilities Engineering Command	Vern Clark; Michael Mullen
39	Michael R. Johnson	RADM; Michael R. Johnson	20 October 2000	24 October 2003	3 years, 4 days	Naval Facilities Engineering Command	Vern Clark
38	Louis M. Smith	RADM; Louis M. Smith	25 September 1998	20 October 2000	2 years, 25 days	Naval Facilities Engineering Command	Jay L. Johnson; Vern Clark
37	David J. Nash	RADM; David J. Nash	15 September 1995	25 September 1998	3 years, 10 days	Naval Facilities Engineering Command	Michael Boorda; Jay L. Johnson
36	Jack E. Buffington	RADM; Jack E. Buffington	18 September 1992	15 September 1995	2 years, 362 days	Naval Facilities Engineering Command	Frank Kelso; Michael Boorda
35	David E. Bottorff	RADM; David E. Bottorff	27 October 1989	18 September 1992	2 years, 327 days	Naval Facilities Engineering Command	Carlisle Trost; Frank Kelso
34	Benjamin F. Montoya	RADM; Benjamin F. Montoya	14 August 1987	27 October 1989	2 years, 74 days	Naval Facilities Engineering Command	Carlisle Trost
33	John Paul Jones Jr.	RADM; John Paul Jones Jr.	31 August 1984	14 August 1987	2 years, 348 days	Naval Facilities Engineering Command	James D. Watkins; Carlisle Trost
32	William M. Zobel	RADM; William M. Zobel	15 January 1981	31 August 1984	3 years, 229 days	Naval Facilities Engineering Command	Thomas B. Hayward; James D. Watkins
31	Donald G. Iselin	RADM; Donald G. Iselin	27 May 1977	15 January 1981	3 years, 233 days	Naval Facilities Engineering Command	James L. Holloway III; Thomas B. Hayward
30	Albert R. Marschall	RADM; Albert R. Marschall	11 May 1973	27 May 1977	4 years, 16 days	Naval Facilities Engineering Command	Elmo Zumwalt; James L. Holloway III
29	Walter M. Enger	RADM; Walter M. Enger	29 August 1969	11 May 1973	3 years, 255 days	Naval Facilities Engineering Command	Thomas Hinman Moorer; Elmo Zumwalt
28	Alexander C. Husband	RADM; Alexander C. Husband	1 November 1965	29 August 1969	3 years, 301 days	Naval Facilities Engineering Command	David L. McDonald; Thomas Hinman Moorer
27	Peter Corradi	RADM; Peter Corradi	12 February 1962	31 October 1965	3 years, 261 days	Bureau of Yards and Docks	George Whelan Anderson Jr. David L. McDonald
26	Eugene J. Peltier	RADM; Eugene J. Peltier	2 December 1957	30 January 1962	4 years, 59 days	Bureau of Yards and Docks	Arleigh Burke; George Whelan Anderson Jr.
25	Robert H. Meade	RADM; Robert H. Meade	8 November 1955	30 November 1957	2 years, 22 days	Bureau of Yards and Docks	Arleigh Burke
24	John Richard Perry	RADM; John Richard Perry	3 November 1953	25 September 1955	1 year, 326 days	Bureau of Yards and Docks	Robert Carney; Arleigh Burke
23	Joseph F. Jelley	RADM; Joseph F. Jelley	1 December 1949	3 November 1953	3 years, 337 days	Bureau of Yards and Docks	Forrest Sherman; Lynde D. McCormick; William Fechteler; Robert Carney
22	John J. Manning	RADM; John J. Manning (1894–1962)	1 December 1945	1 December 1949	4 years, 0 days	Bureau of Yards and Docks	Ernest J. King; Chester W. Nimitz; Louis E. Denfeld; Forrest Sherman
21	Ben Moreell	RADM; Ben Moreell (1892–1978)	1 December 1937	1 December 1945	8 years, 0 days	Bureau of Yards and Docks	William D. Leahy; Harold Rainsford Stark; Ernest J. King
20	Norman M. Smith	RADM; Norman M. Smith	23 December 1933	30 November 1937	3 years, 342 days	Bureau of Yards and Docks	William Harrison Standley; William D. Leahy
19	Archibald L. Parsons	RADM; Archibald L. Parsons	23 December 1929	22 December 1933	3 years, 364 days	Bureau of Yards and Docks	Charles Frederick Hughes; William V. Pratt; William Harrison Standley
18	Luther E. Gregory	RADM; Luther E. Gregory	20 December 1921	21 December 1929	8 years, 1 day	Bureau of Yards and Docks	Robert Coontz; Edward Walter Eberle; Charles Frederick Hughes
17	Charles W. Parks	RADM; Charles W. Parks	11 January 1918	15 December 1921	3 years, 338 days	Bureau of Yards and Docks	William S. Benson; Robert Coontz
16	Frederic R. Harris	RADM; Frederic R. Harris	21 January 1916	30 November 1917	1 year, 313 days	Bureau of Yards and Docks	William S. Benson
15	Homer R. Stanford	RADM; Homer R. Stanford	14 January 1912	13 January 1916	3 years, 364 days	Bureau of Yards and Docks	Charles E. Vreeland; Bradley A. Fiske; William S. Benson
14	Richard C. Hollyday	RADM; Richard C. Hollyday	26 March 1907	13 January 1912	4 years, 293 days	Bureau of Yards and Docks	Richard Wainwright; Charles E. Vreeland
13	Harry H. Rousseau	RADM; Harry H. Rousseau	6 January 1907	25 March 1907	78 days	Bureau of Yards and Docks	
12	Mordecai T. Endicott	RADM; Mordecai T. Endicott	4 April 1898	5 January 1907	8 years, 276 days	Bureau of Yards and Docks	
11	Edmund O. Matthews	CDRE; Edmund O. Matthews	21 March 1894	16 March 1898	3 years, 360 days	Bureau of Yards and Docks	
10	Norman H. Farquhar	CDRE; Norman H. Farquhar	6 March 1890	6 March 1894	4 years, 0 days	Bureau of Yards and Docks	
9	George D. White	CDRE; George D. White	2 April 1889	27 February 1890	331 days	Bureau of Yards and Docks	
8	David B. Harmony	CDRE; David B. Harmony	27 March 1885	2 April 1889	4 years, 6 days	Bureau of Yards and Docks	
7	Edward T. Nichols	CDRE; Edward T. Nichols	4 June 1881	1 March 1885	3 years, 270 days	Bureau of Yards and Docks	
6	Richard L. Law	CDRE; Richard L. Law	1 July 1878	4 June 1881	2 years, 338 days	Bureau of Yards and Docks	
5	John C. Howell	CDRE; John C. Howell	21 September 1874	1 July 1878	3 years, 283 days	Bureau of Yards and Docks	
4	Christopher R. P. Rodgers	CDRE; Christopher R. P. Rodgers	1 October 1871	21 September 1874	2 years, 355 days	Bureau of Yards and Docks	
3	Daniel Ammen	CAPT; Daniel Ammen	1 May 1869	1 October 1871	2 years, 153 days	Bureau of Yards and Docks	
2	Joseph Smith	CAPT; Joseph Smith	25 May 1846	1 May 1869	22 years, 341 days	Bureau of Yards and Docks	
1	Lewis Warrington	CAPT; Lewis Warrington	31 August 1842	25 May 1846	3 years, 267 days	Bureau of Yards and Docks	

== Notable Seabees ==
- Ben Moreell
- David Robinson, NBA player who served two years active duty in the U.S. Navy with the CEC

== See also ==
- Military engineering of the United States
- Seabees in World War II
- Underwater Construction Teams
