= William Allen Darden Jr. =

WWII Army officer

William A. Darden Jr.
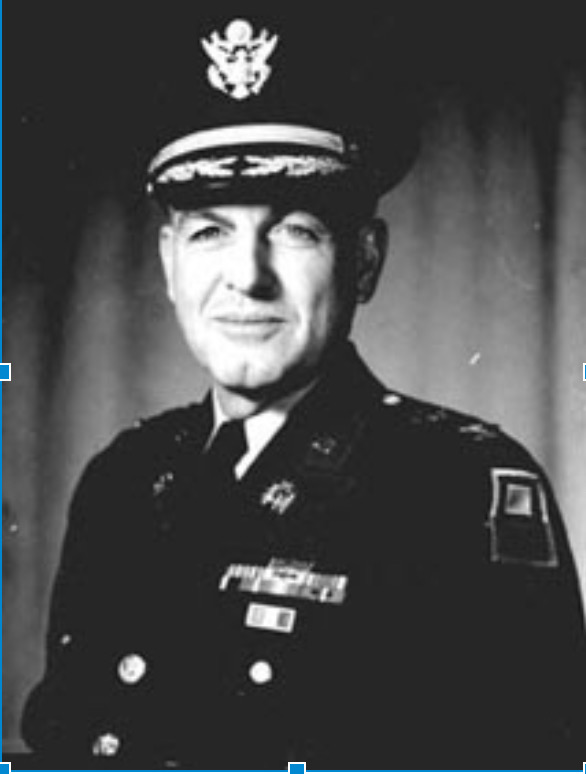
- Colonel William A. Darden, Jr. circa 1965
- Born: March 29, 1910; Nashville, Tennessee, U.S.
- Died: August 30, 1993 (aged 83); Nashville, Tennessee, U.S.
- Burial place: Harpeth Hills Memory Gardens, Nashville, Tennessee
- Military career
- Allegiance: United States
- Branch: United States Army
- Service years: 1935–1965
- Rank: Colonel
- Unit: U.S. Army Corps of Engineers
- Awards: Legion of Merit · Bronze Star with Oak Leaf Cluster · Royal Order of George I · 3 Campaign Stars · Assault Arrowhead · Presidential Unit Citation · Philippine Liberation Medal

William Allen Darden Jr. (March 29, 1910 – August 30, 1993) was a United States Army officer who served as a colonel in the United States Army Corps of Engineers.

== Early life and education ==
Darden graduated from Central High School in Nashville in 1928, attended Vanderbilt University 1930–1933, and received a B.S. in civil engineering from Georgia Institute of Technology in 1935. He later earned an M.S. from George Washington University in 1970.

== Career ==
In the 1930s and early 1940s he worked as a civilian engineer for the U.S. Army Corps of Engineers in Nashville and published technical articles on river navigation and flood control in The Tennessean. Commissioned through ROTC, he entered active duty during World War II, serving first as Area Engineer at Camp Forrest, Tennessee, and Wright Field, Ohio, before deploying with the 6th Infantry Division to the Pacific Theater. Post-war assignments included air engineer adviser in Greece (1948–1951), for which he received the Royal Order of George I; Command and General Staff College (1952); Assistant District Engineer, Tullahoma, Tennessee (1952–1955); Strategic Intelligence School (1956); and Assistant Army Attaché in New Delhi, India (late 1950s). Promoted to colonel in 1960, he served at the Pentagon and Bureau of Yards and Docks until retirement on July 13, 1965. His temporary duty assignments took him to more than 30 countries. He was awarded the Legion of Merit (1960–1965), the Bronze Star with Oak Leaf Cluster, three Campaign Stars, Assault Arrowhead, Presidential Unit Citation, and Philippine Liberation Medal for World War II service. His promotion to lieutenant colonel was confirmed by Act of Congress in 1953.

== Later life ==
After retirement he worked as a civilian engineer for the Nashville District, U.S. Army Corps of Engineers, until 1977, including projects on Percy Priest Dam, Cordell Hull Dam, and Barkley Dam. He died in Nashville and is buried at Harpeth Hills Memory Gardens.

== Personal life ==
Darden was married to Mary Ransom Darden. They had four children: Kathryn Elizabeth, William Michael, and adopted Mary Cynthia and Richard Allen.
