= John Richard Perry =

John Richard Perry may refer to:

- John Richard Perry (admiral) (1899 – 1955), admiral of the United States Navy
- John Richard Perry (philosopher) (born 1943), American philosopher
