= Naval Facilities Engineering Systems Command =

One of the "systems commands" of the United States Navy

Coordinates: 38°52′26.1″N 76°59′44.1″W

Naval Facilities Engineering Systems Command (NAVFAC)
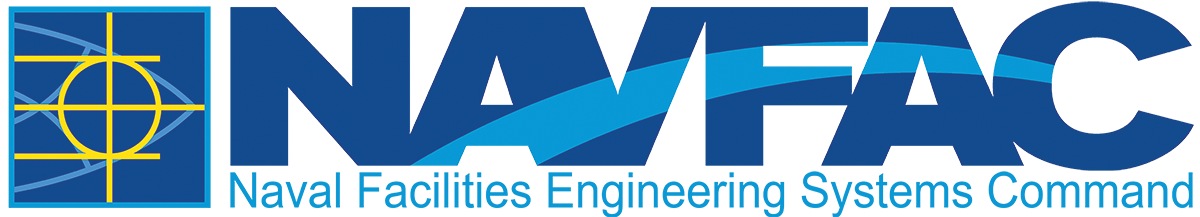
- Founded: 1966; 60 years ago
- Allegiance: United States of America
- Branch: United States Navy
- Type: SYSCOM
- Garrison/HQ: Washington Navy Yard, Washington D.C., U.S.
- Website: www.navfac.navy.mil

Commanders
- Commander and Chief of Civil Engineers: RADM Jeff Kilian, CEC, USN
- Executive Director: Paul A. Pollock
- Force Master Chief: Kevin M. Nolan, USN

The Naval Facilities Engineering Systems Command (NAVFAC) is the United States Navy's engineering systems command, providing the Navy and United States Marine Corps with facilities and expeditionary expertise. NAVFAC is headquartered at the Washington Navy Yard and is under the command of RADM Jeff Kilian.

The Naval Facilities Engineering Systems Command is the oldest of the Navy's system commands, having been established as the Bureau of Yards and Docks in August 1842. Its officers comprise the Navy Civil Engineer Corps, which was formed in March 1867. During the 1966 reorganization of the Department of the Navy, the Bureau of Yards and Docks became the Naval Facilities Engineering Command. In October 2020, the name changed to the current Naval Facilities Engineering Systems Command.

== Organization ==
The Naval Facilities Engineering Systems Command delivers facilities engineering and acquisition for the Navy and Marine Corps through six business lines.

=== Business Lines ===
As of July 2022, NAVFAC consisted of the following nine business lines per its website:

- Asset Management: Manages the full real estate function for the U.S. Navy and Marine Corps, including acquisitions, disposals, easements and leases, as well as overseeing global and regional shore strategic planning.
- Design and Construction: Delivers facilities project development, design, and construction, as well as expertise in medical facilities and waterfront and ocean facilities.
- Environmental: Provides environmental management and technical support necessary for Navy and Marine Corps compliance with federal, state, local and host nation regulations.
- Expeditionary: Provides support for a broad community, which includes the Navy Expeditionary Combat Command, Naval Beach Groups, Naval Special Warfare, Navy Expeditionary Medical Support and similar expeditionary forces ashore.
- Public Works: Supports installation infrastructure, which includes facility management, utilities and energy management, base support vehicles and equipment, facility support contracts management, and facility services.
- Office of Small Business Programs
- Safety -Mishap Prevention and Hazard Abatement
- Real Estate: acquisition, management, and disposal of real estate interests required by the Navy and Marine Corps
- New Business Line Landing Page

The contingency engineering section which as of 2020 provided contingency contracting, exercise and crisis planning, natural disaster support, remote construction, and technical reach-back support, was no longer listed as of July 2022.

=== Component Commands ===
As of 2015, NAVFAC consisted of 13 component commands; nine are Facilities Engineering Commands that report to either NAVFAC Atlantic or NAVFAC Pacific.

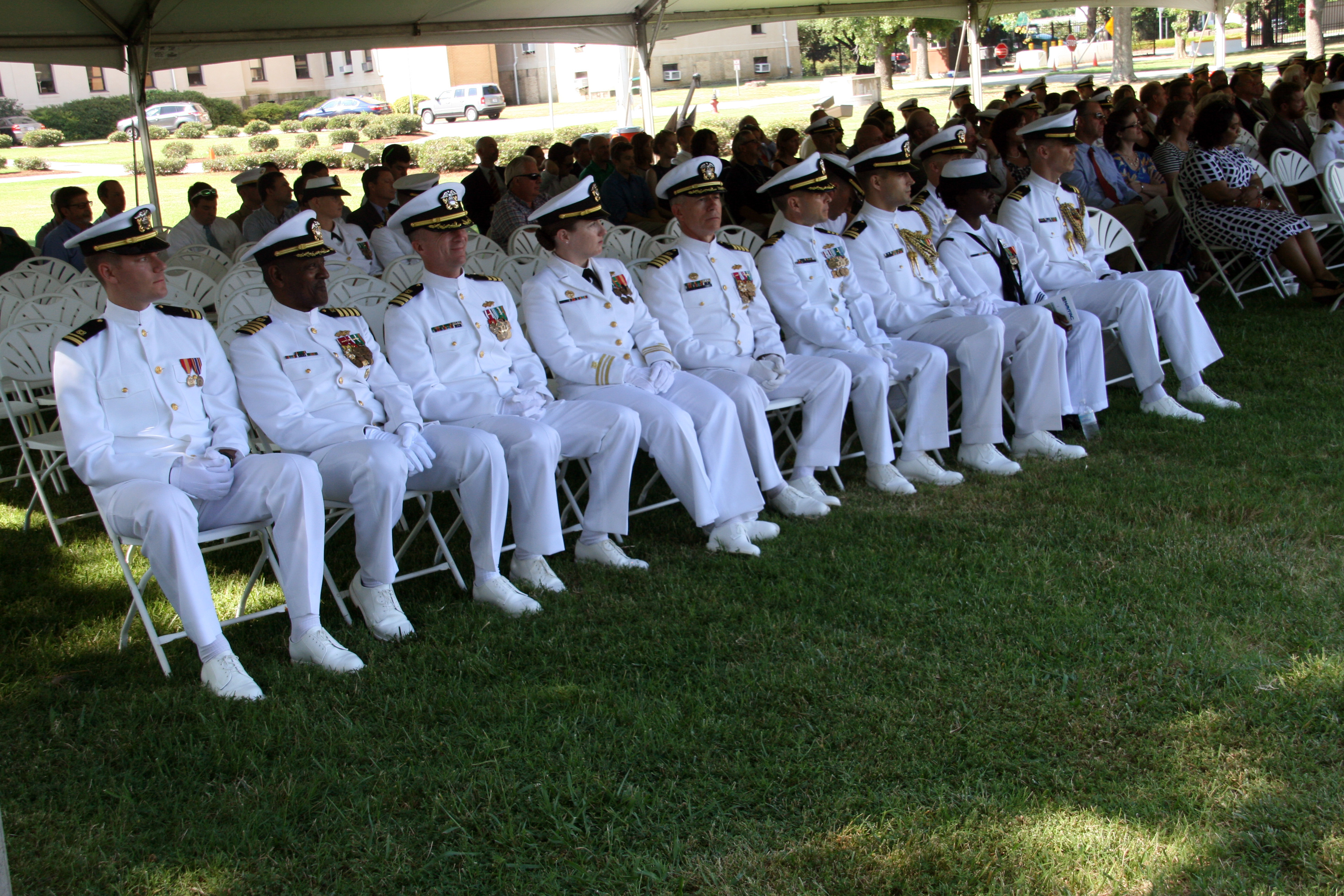
Officers of NAVFAC Atlantic in 2016

NAVFAC Atlantic in Norfolk, VA

- NAVFAC Europe Africa Central (EURAFCENT) in Naples, Italy
- NAVFAC Mid-Atlantic (ML) in Norfolk, VA
- NAVFAC Southeast (SE) in Jacksonville, FL
- NAVFAC Washington (WASH) in Washington, D.C.

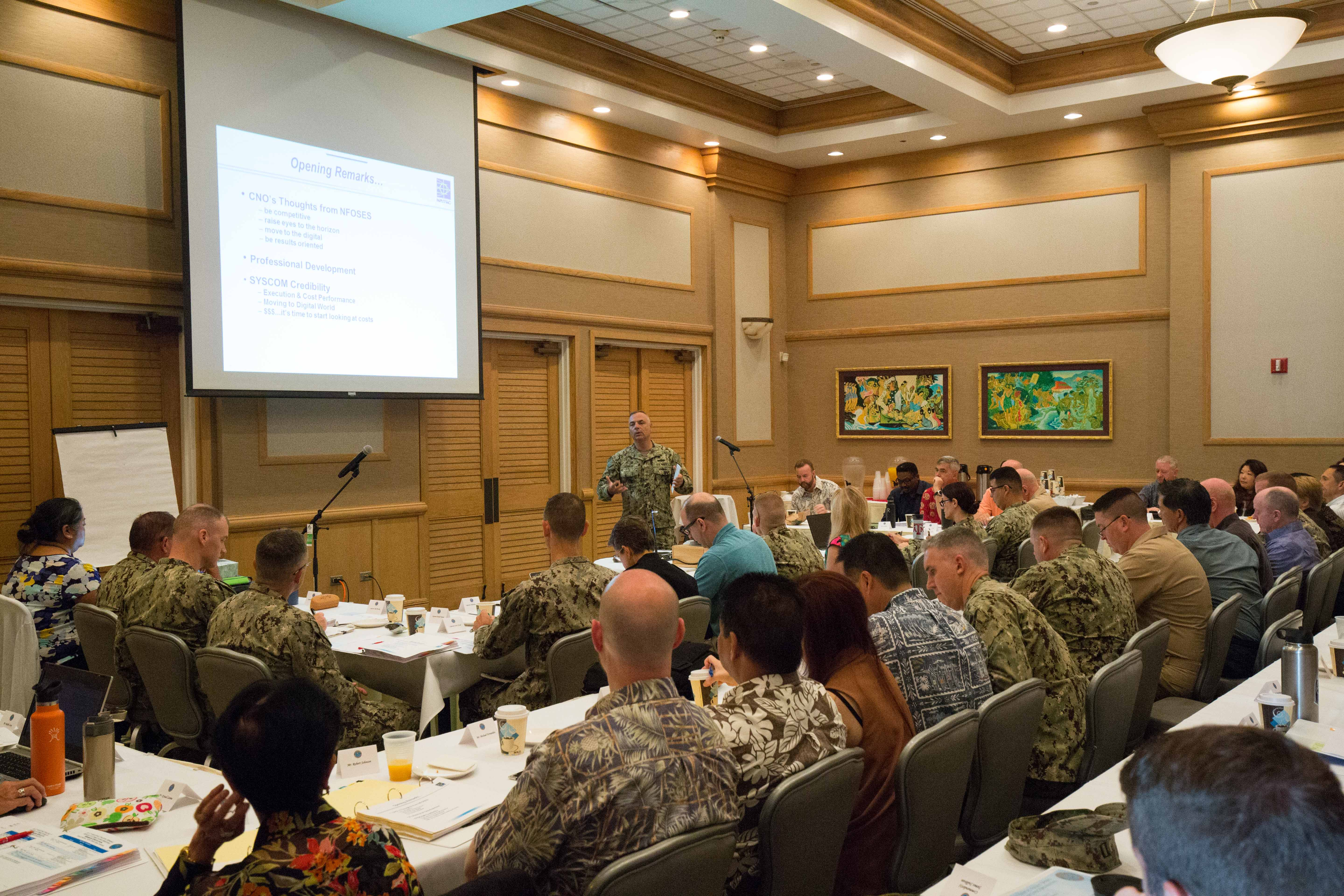
A 2017 meeting of the NAVFAC Pacific Board of Directors at Fort Shafter, Honolulu, Hawaii

NAVFAC Pacific in Pearl Harbor, Hawaii

- NAVFAC Far East (FE) in Yokosuka, Japan
- NAVFAC Hawaii (HI) in Pearl Harbor, Hawaii
- NAVFAC Marianas (MAR) in Piti, Guam
- NAVFAC Northwest (NW) in Silverdale, WA
- NAVFAC Southwest (SW) in San Diego, CA

There are also two specialty commands, Navy Crane Center (NCC) at the Norfolk Naval Shipyard in Portsmouth, Virginia and Naval Facilities Engineering and Expeditionary Warfare Center (EXWC) at Naval Base Ventura County in Port Hueneme, California.

== History ==
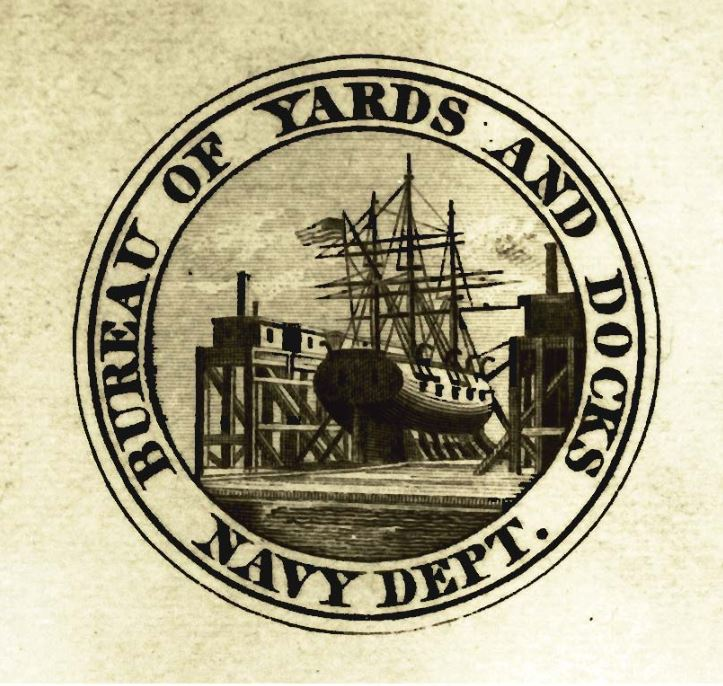
Logo of the Bureau of Yards and Docks

=== Bureau of Yards and Docks ===
On August 31, 1842, the Bureau of Navy Yards and Docks (BuDocks) was established, the forerunner to the Naval Facilities Engineering Systems Command.

In early days of BuDocks, the command originally had responsibility only for the design, construction, and maintenance of Navy yards and a few other shore stations. In 1842 there were seven Navy yards arrayed along the eastern seaboard of the United States. Captain Lewis Warrington, a line officer, and six civilian employees, were assigned to administer public works at these yards.

During the second half of the 19th century, the Bureau of Yards and Docks guided the temporary expansion of the shore establishment that was necessary to fight the American Civil War. It also oversaw the development of permanent Navy yards on the Pacific Coast at Mare Island, California, and Puget Sound, Washington.

In 1898, the Spanish–American War precipitated a great increase in the Bureau's activities. Its civilian workforce grew from seven to 22 people and the Civil Engineer Corps—which had been established in 1867—was expanded from 10 to 21 commissioned officers, five of whom reported for duty at Bureau Headquarters. The treaty at the war's end led to the construction of naval stations in Puerto Rico, Guam and the Philippines. In the next few years the Navy yards at Boston, Norfolk, and Philadelphia were modernized and a new yard was built at Charleston, South Carolina.

During the early years of the 20th century, the United States Congress expanded the Bureau's responsibilities by consolidating Navy public works under its control. The most important law was passed in 1911, when Congress placed the design and construction of all naval shore stations under BuDocks control. Previously the bureau that operated each type of shore facility had performed its own design and construction; for example, the Bureau of Ordnance built naval magazines and the Bureau of Medicine and Surgery built naval hospitals.

The experience gained by the Bureau during its first 75 years laid the foundation for its large growth during World War I. Between July 1916 and the armistice in November 1918, the Bureau expended $347 million for public works. That was more money than the Navy had spent on shore stations in the previous 116 years. The construction program included 35 naval training stations, in addition to submarine bases at New London, Connecticut; Pearl Harbor, Hawaii; and Coco Solo, Panama; as well as naval air stations at locations throughout the eastern United States, and in the United Kingdom, Ireland, Italy, Tunisia and France.

=== Between WWI and WWII ===
The period between the world wars was generally a time of retrenchment and stagnation for Navy Public Works. By 1921, more than 375 ships had been decommissioned and the shore establishment shrank accordingly. During the Great Depression of the 1930s, Congress appropriated some money for a naval construction program, which made improvements in shore facilities while providing much-needed jobs for unemployed civilians. When the Second World War broke out in Europe in 1939, the Civil Engineer Corps (CEC) had fewer than 200 officers on active duty and the shore establishment was woefully unprepared for a major conflict.

After the attack on Pearl Harbor in December 1941, the Navy's military construction program amounted to global proportions, expanding far beyond the continental United States and its prewar possessions to Europe, North Africa, Asia and the far corners of the Pacific. To provide supervisors for this huge wartime effort, more than 10,000 Reserve CEC officers were recruited from civilian life between 1940 and 1945.

The establishment of bases in war zones, where workers were subject to enemy attack, made the use of civilian construction men impractical at many overseas locations. Therefore, in 1942 Rear Admiral Ben Moreell, Chief of the Bureau of Yards and Docks, implemented a proposal mapped out by the Bureau's War Plans Section during the 1930s where experienced construction workers were recruited into the Navy to build overseas bases. Thus, the Naval Construction Force – popularly known as the Seabees – was born. The new Seabees received brief military training before shipping overseas to build advance bases in war zones. Led by Reserve CEC officers, the 325,000 men recruited for the Seabees during World War II built bases on six continents and at locations all over the Pacific. Without the Seabees, the Navy's huge advance-base construction program would not have been possible.

=== WWII boom ===
World War II presented the Bureau of Yards and Docks with the greatest challenge in its history. The value of the naval shore establishment in 1939 was estimated at less than half a billion dollars; by 1945 the shore establishment was worth at least $6.5 billion. All of this new construction was carried out under the Bureau's cognizance.

At the end of the war, the Bureau faced a new problem—maintaining a much larger shore establishment with reduced funding. The onset of the Cold War in the late 1940s led to some much-needed increases in the Bureau's budget. Then, in 1950 the Korean War, which required more men and materials than World War I, presented the Bureau with new challenges. With the help of the Seabees, it met the emergency. CEC officers and Seabees built bases throughout the Pacific to support United Nations troops. In Korea the Seabees placed landing causeways for the invasion forces and built air bases and camps.

=== Vietnam ===
In the mid-1960s the Vietnam War started. Although it was modest in size compared to World War II, it nonetheless created a demand for a substantial amount of military construction. In 1963 the Bureau of Yards and Docks was formally designated as the contract construction agent for Southeast Asia and became responsible for nearly all U.S. construction there, including facilities built for the United States Army, the United States Air Force, and other federal government agencies. Nearly 1.8 billion dollars’ worth of construction went into Vietnam under the Military Construction Program commonly known as MILCON.

Meanwhile, in May 1966, as a result of a Navy Department reorganization, the Bureau of Yards and Docks was renamed Naval Facilities Engineering Command (NAVFAC), one of six systems commands under the Chief of Naval Material. This reorganization eliminated the traditional bilinear organization under which the Chief of Naval Operations and the chiefs of the various bureaus reported separately to the Secretary of the Navy. The result was a unilinear organization, under which the systems commands reported to the Chief of Naval Material, who in turn reported to the CNO. In the mid-1980s the Naval Material Command was disestablished; and NAVFAC began reporting directly to the Chief of Naval Operations.

U.S. forces withdrew from Vietnam in 1973 and the end of American participation in the war brought demobilization and funding cuts to the Navy. In 1970, in anticipation of postwar reductions, NAVFAC consolidated its 13 engineering field divisions into six. The concentration of technical expertise into fewer and larger divisions led to a stronger and more efficient field organization. Within NAVFAC, in the 1970s emphasis was placed on improvements in personnel facilities to support the new all-volunteer Navy, environmental protection, and energy conservation.

=== Peacetime ===
The tight military budgets of the 1970s did not last long, however, for in 1980 the United States began one of the largest peacetime military buildups in its history. For fiscal year 1981, President Jimmy Carter requested an increase in the Department of Defense budget of more than 5 percent real growth. After Ronald Reagan took office the next January, the DOD budget grew even faster.

In 1981 Secretary of the Navy John Lehman embarked upon a major program of shipbuilding to increase the fleet from 540 ships to 600 ships by the middle of the decade. This expansion meant that the Navy needed more shore facilities to support the new ships, which in turn led to more construction work for NAVFAC. Between fiscal years 1982 and 1985, Congress appropriated more than $5 billion for Navy MILCON projects.

=== Post–Cold War ===
At the end of the 1980s, the collapse of the Soviet Union brought an abrupt end to the Cold War and the Navy no longer needed as many ships, planes and bases to support them. From NAVFAC's perspective, one of the most important results was the Base Realignment and Closure Program (BRAC). Between 1988 and 1995, Congress authorized four rounds of selections for base closures and numerous installations were slated for disestablishment. Until the fall of 2004, NAVFAC managed the BRAC Program for the Navy and Marine Corps. By the end of fiscal year 2004, the Command had helped the Navy dispose of 72 unneeded bases and had an inventory of 19 closed installations remaining to be excessed.

In October 2003 an important change occurred in the administration of the naval shore establishment with a new command known as Commander Naval Installations Command, (CNIC) was established. The CNIC would provide uniform program, policy and funding management for all Navy shore installations.

In 2004, NAVFAC embarked upon a realignment of its organizational structure and its business lines. It made a major move towards improving and standardizing its business processes to help NAVFAC better support the Navy and Marine Corps and other federal clients. The most significant aspect of NAVFAC's transformation was the consolidation of NAVFAC field activities – including engineering field divisions, engineering field activities, officer in charge of construction organizations, public works centers and departments – into regional facilities engineering commands, or FECs. The FECs provide the Navy, Marine Corps, and other clients with a single center for all NAVFAC public works, engineering, and acquisition support to ensure a uniform, enterprise approach to accomplishing its mission.

On 14 October 2020, the Director, Navy Staff approved renaming NAVFAC to Naval Facilities Engineering Systems Command, adding Systems to accurately reflect its authority and mission.

=== Closures and relocations ===
A side effect of this realignment was the decommissioning of several NAVFAC components and displacement of hundreds of employees. Notable among the closures was Engineering Field Activity Northeast in Lester, Pennsylvania. The Navy Crane Center, which was also located in Lester, was relocated to Norfolk Naval Shipyard in Portsmouth, Virginia. Southern Division in Charleston, South Carolina was decommissioned on September 30, 2007 and the command was realigned in Jacksonville, Florida, to become NAVFAC Southeast. NAVFAC Midwest in North Chicago, Illinois was disestablished on September 30, 2014 and its missions were absorbed by NAVFAC Mid-Atlantic, NAVFAC Southeast and NAVFAC Northwest.

== Administrative Records ==
NAVFAC archives the administrative records pertaining to the environmental restoration of its naval facilities. As of 2022, these were grouped into 5 US regions, namely Northwest, Hawaii, Southwest, Midatlantic and Southeast.

== Commanders ==
| No. | Portrait | Chief of Civil Engineer | Took office | Left office | Time in office | Command | Chief of Naval Operations |
|---|---|---|---|---|---|---|---|
| 46 | Dean VanderLey | RADM; Dean VanderLey | 12 August 2022 | Incumbent | 4 years, 30 days | Naval Facilities Engineering Systems Command | Michael M. Gilday; Lisa Franchetti |
| 45 | John W. Korka | RADM; John W. Korka | 19 October 2018 | 12 August 2022 | 3 years, 297 days | Naval Facilities Engineering Systems Command | John M. Richardson; Michael M. Gilday |
| 44 | Bret J. Muilenburg | RADM; Bret J. Muilenburg | 4 November 2015 | 19 October 2018 | 2 years, 349 days | Naval Facilities Engineering Command | John M. Richardson |
| 43 | Katherine L. Gregory | RADM; Katherine L. Gregory | 26 October 2012 | 4 November 2015 | 3 years, 9 days | Naval Facilities Engineering Command | Jonathan Greenert; John M. Richardson |
| 42 | Christopher J. Mossey | RADM; Christopher J. Mossey | 21 May 2010 | 26 October 2012 | 2 years, 158 days | Naval Facilities Engineering Command | Gary Roughead; Jonathan Greenert |
| 41 | Wayne "Greg" Shear | RADM; Wayne "Greg" Shear | 27 October 2006 | 21 May 2010 | 3 years, 206 days | Naval Facilities Engineering Command | Michael Mullen; Gary Roughead |
| 40 | Michael K. Loose | RADM; Michael K. Loose | 24 October 2003 | 27 October 2006 | 3 years, 3 days | Naval Facilities Engineering Command | Vern Clark; Michael Mullen |
| 39 | Michael R. Johnson | RADM; Michael R. Johnson | 20 October 2000 | 24 October 2003 | 3 years, 4 days | Naval Facilities Engineering Command | Vern Clark |
| 38 | Louis M. Smith | RADM; Louis M. Smith | 25 September 1998 | 20 October 2000 | 2 years, 25 days | Naval Facilities Engineering Command | Jay L. Johnson; Vern Clark |
| 37 | David J. Nash | RADM; David J. Nash | 15 September 1995 | 25 September 1998 | 3 years, 10 days | Naval Facilities Engineering Command | Michael Boorda; Jay L. Johnson |
| 36 | Jack E. Buffington | RADM; Jack E. Buffington | 18 September 1992 | 15 September 1995 | 2 years, 362 days | Naval Facilities Engineering Command | Frank Kelso; Michael Boorda |
| 35 | David E. Bottorff | RADM; David E. Bottorff | 27 October 1989 | 18 September 1992 | 2 years, 327 days | Naval Facilities Engineering Command | Carlisle Trost; Frank Kelso |
| 34 | Benjamin F. Montoya | RADM; Benjamin F. Montoya | 14 August 1987 | 27 October 1989 | 2 years, 74 days | Naval Facilities Engineering Command | Carlisle Trost |
| 33 | John Paul Jones Jr. | RADM; John Paul Jones Jr. | 31 August 1984 | 14 August 1987 | 2 years, 348 days | Naval Facilities Engineering Command | James D. Watkins; Carlisle Trost |
| 32 | William M. Zobel | RADM; William M. Zobel | 15 January 1981 | 31 August 1984 | 3 years, 229 days | Naval Facilities Engineering Command | Thomas B. Hayward; James D. Watkins |
| 31 | Donald G. Iselin | RADM; Donald G. Iselin | 27 May 1977 | 15 January 1981 | 3 years, 233 days | Naval Facilities Engineering Command | James L. Holloway III; Thomas B. Hayward |
| 30 | Albert R. Marschall | RADM; Albert R. Marschall | 11 May 1973 | 27 May 1977 | 4 years, 16 days | Naval Facilities Engineering Command | Elmo Zumwalt; James L. Holloway III |
| 29 | Walter M. Enger | RADM; Walter M. Enger | 29 August 1969 | 11 May 1973 | 3 years, 255 days | Naval Facilities Engineering Command | Thomas Hinman Moorer; Elmo Zumwalt |
| 28 | Alexander C. Husband | RADM; Alexander C. Husband | 1 November 1965 | 29 August 1969 | 3 years, 301 days | Naval Facilities Engineering Command | David L. McDonald; Thomas Hinman Moorer |
| 27 | Peter Corradi | RADM; Peter Corradi | 12 February 1962 | 31 October 1965 | 3 years, 261 days | Bureau of Yards and Docks | George Whelan Anderson Jr. David L. McDonald |
| 26 | Eugene J. Peltier | RADM; Eugene J. Peltier | 2 December 1957 | 30 January 1962 | 4 years, 59 days | Bureau of Yards and Docks | Arleigh Burke; George Whelan Anderson Jr. |
| 25 | Robert H. Meade | RADM; Robert H. Meade | 8 November 1955 | 30 November 1957 | 2 years, 22 days | Bureau of Yards and Docks | Arleigh Burke |
| 24 | John Richard Perry | RADM; John Richard Perry | 3 November 1953 | 25 September 1955 | 1 year, 326 days | Bureau of Yards and Docks | Robert Carney; Arleigh Burke |
| 23 | Joseph F. Jelley | RADM; Joseph F. Jelley | 1 December 1949 | 3 November 1953 | 3 years, 337 days | Bureau of Yards and Docks | Forrest Sherman; Lynde D. McCormick; William Fechteler; Robert Carney |
| 22 | John J. Manning | RADM; John J. Manning (1894–1962) | 1 December 1945 | 1 December 1949 | 4 years, 0 days | Bureau of Yards and Docks | Ernest J. King; Chester W. Nimitz; Louis E. Denfeld; Forrest Sherman |
| 21 | Ben Moreell | RADM; Ben Moreell (1892–1978) | 1 December 1937 | 1 December 1945 | 8 years, 0 days | Bureau of Yards and Docks | William D. Leahy; Harold Rainsford Stark; Ernest J. King |
| 20 | Norman M. Smith | RADM; Norman M. Smith | 23 December 1933 | 30 November 1937 | 3 years, 342 days | Bureau of Yards and Docks | William Harrison Standley; William D. Leahy |
| 19 | Archibald L. Parsons | RADM; Archibald L. Parsons | 23 December 1929 | 22 December 1933 | 3 years, 364 days | Bureau of Yards and Docks | Charles Frederick Hughes; William V. Pratt; William Harrison Standley |
| 18 | Luther E. Gregory | RADM; Luther E. Gregory | 20 December 1921 | 21 December 1929 | 8 years, 1 day | Bureau of Yards and Docks | Robert Coontz; Edward Walter Eberle; Charles Frederick Hughes |
| 17 | Charles W. Parks | RADM; Charles W. Parks | 11 January 1918 | 15 December 1921 | 3 years, 338 days | Bureau of Yards and Docks | William S. Benson; Robert Coontz |
| 16 | Frederic R. Harris | RADM; Frederic R. Harris | 21 January 1916 | 30 November 1917 | 1 year, 313 days | Bureau of Yards and Docks | William S. Benson |
| 15 | Homer R. Stanford | RADM; Homer R. Stanford | 14 January 1912 | 13 January 1916 | 3 years, 364 days | Bureau of Yards and Docks | Charles E. Vreeland; Bradley A. Fiske; William S. Benson |
| 14 | Richard C. Hollyday | RADM; Richard C. Hollyday | 26 March 1907 | 13 January 1912 | 4 years, 293 days | Bureau of Yards and Docks | Richard Wainwright; Charles E. Vreeland |
| 13 | Harry H. Rousseau | RADM; Harry H. Rousseau | 6 January 1907 | 25 March 1907 | 78 days | Bureau of Yards and Docks | |
| 12 | Mordecai T. Endicott | RADM; Mordecai T. Endicott | 4 April 1898 | 5 January 1907 | 8 years, 276 days | Bureau of Yards and Docks | |
| 11 | Edmund O. Matthews | CDRE; Edmund O. Matthews | 21 March 1894 | 16 March 1898 | 3 years, 360 days | Bureau of Yards and Docks | |
| 10 | Norman H. Farquhar | CDRE; Norman H. Farquhar | 6 March 1890 | 6 March 1894 | 4 years, 0 days | Bureau of Yards and Docks | |
| 9 | George D. White | CDRE; George D. White | 2 April 1889 | 27 February 1890 | 331 days | Bureau of Yards and Docks | |
| 8 | David B. Harmony | CDRE; David B. Harmony | 27 March 1885 | 2 April 1889 | 4 years, 6 days | Bureau of Yards and Docks | |
| 7 | Edward T. Nichols | CDRE; Edward T. Nichols | 4 June 1881 | 1 March 1885 | 3 years, 270 days | Bureau of Yards and Docks | |
| 6 | Richard L. Law | CDRE; Richard L. Law | 1 July 1878 | 4 June 1881 | 2 years, 338 days | Bureau of Yards and Docks | |
| 5 | John C. Howell | CDRE; John C. Howell | 21 September 1874 | 1 July 1878 | 3 years, 283 days | Bureau of Yards and Docks | |
| 4 | Christopher R. P. Rodgers | CDRE; Christopher R. P. Rodgers | 1 October 1871 | 21 September 1874 | 2 years, 355 days | Bureau of Yards and Docks | |
| 3 | Daniel Ammen | CAPT; Daniel Ammen | 1 May 1869 | 1 October 1871 | 2 years, 153 days | Bureau of Yards and Docks | |
| 2 | Joseph Smith | CAPT; Joseph Smith | 25 May 1846 | 1 May 1869 | 22 years, 341 days | Bureau of Yards and Docks | |
| 1 | Lewis Warrington | CAPT; Lewis Warrington | 31 August 1842 | 25 May 1846 | 3 years, 267 days | Bureau of Yards and Docks | |

== See also ==
- Naval Facilities Engineering Service Center
- Facilities engineering

U.S. Armed Forces systems commands

- Army Materiel Command
- Marine Corps Systems Command
- United States Navy systems commands
  - Naval Sea Systems Command
  - Naval Air Systems Command
  - Naval Information Warfare Systems Command
  - Naval Supply Systems Command
- Air Force Materiel Command
- Space Systems Command
