= NAVFAC =

NAVFAC is an abbreviation for Naval Facility. The term may refer to:

- Naval Facilities Engineering Systems Command (NAVFAC), the engineering command and its subordinate organizations
- Naval Facility (NAVFAC), cover name for one of the classified shore terminal/processing facilities for the U.S. Navy's Sound Surveillance System
