= Edward S. Hope =

Highest-ranking Black man in the US Navy during World War II

Edward Swain Hope
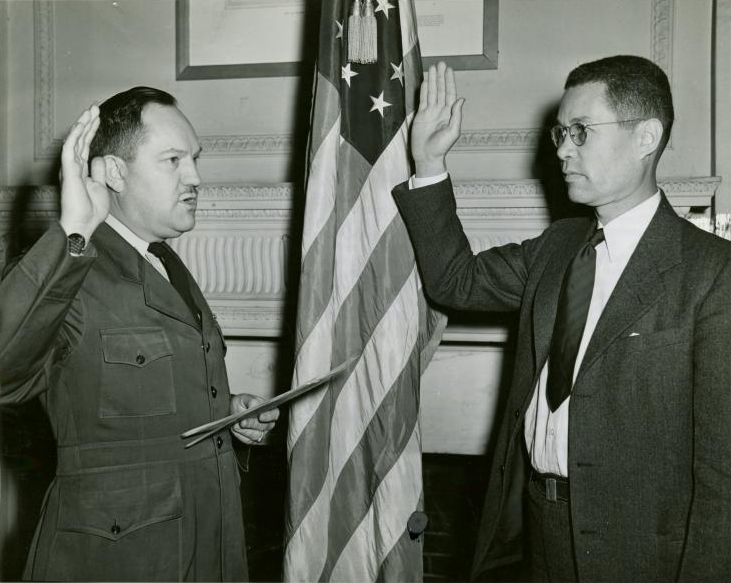
- Dr. Hope being sworn into the U.S. Navy as its highest-ranking Black member in May, 1944.
- Born: August 28, 1901; Atlanta, Georgia
- Died: June 8, 1990 (aged 88); Cleveland, Ohio
- Education: BS, Morehouse College, 1923. BS, MIT, 1925. MS, MIT, 1927. EdD, Columbia University, 1942.
- Occupations: Engineer; Naval officer; University educator
- Years active: Howard University, 1932-1951; US Navy, 1942-1947; American University of Beirut, 1951-1969
- Known for: Serving as the highest-ranked Black man in U.S. naval history at that time.
- Spouse: Marian G. Conover
- Children: Two
- Parent(s): John Hope, Lugenia Burns

Edward Swain Hope (August 28, 1901 – June 8, 1990) was an African-American engineer and university educator. A World War II volunteer and veteran, Hope was, in his postwar service, the first African-American to hold the rank of Lieutenant Commander in the United States Navy.

== Early life and education ==
Edward Swain Hope was born the son of Lugenia (née Burns) and John Hope on August 28, 1901 in Atlanta, Georgia. After graduating from Morehouse Academy, a preparatory school maintained by Morehouse College, he entered that historically Black college. There, he was an honor student, treasurer of the Morehouse College Glee Club for two years, captain of the basketball team, and won the college's Edgar Allen Poe Short Story Prize, among other local distinctions he accumulated while earning a Bachelor's degree in science in 1923. He then matriculated into the Massachusetts Institute of Technology as a sophomore. There he pledged the Sigma chapter of Alpha Pi Alpha fraternity and earned a second Bachelor of Science and a Master's of Science in 1925 and 1927, both in civil engineering. During summer vacations Hope gained practical experience working as a carpenter's apprentice and mechanic's helper, finally ending up as a journeyman mechanic. The summer before undertaking his master's studies, he carried out a survey for a water power project for the Grenfell Mission in Newfoundland, Canada and this survey formed the basis of his master's project. Following graduation from MIT, Hope worked on highway construction for a year on Long Island, New York, and then spent three years in Brazil working on hydroelectric development for the American Foreign Power Company. By 1931 he had returned to the United States and was building a new road through Spelman College.

He soon became Superintendent of Buildings and Grounds at Howard University in 1932. On July 24, 1933 he married Marion Grace Conover in a ceremony performed by the president of Howard University. This was a time of great expansion and development at the university during the New Deal, and the president, treasurer and Hope were accused of misusing Public Works Administration funds. The university repaid $29,000 and a study of the situation by the Department of the Interior found evidence only of serious mistakes, not wilful wrongdoing, but recommended that the three men be fired. However, Hope remained superintendent of buildings and grounds until 1938. From 1939 to 1942 he attended Teachers College, Columbia University where he earned a Doctor of Education degree in personnel administration. While there, he lived in the International House of New York.

== Naval service ==
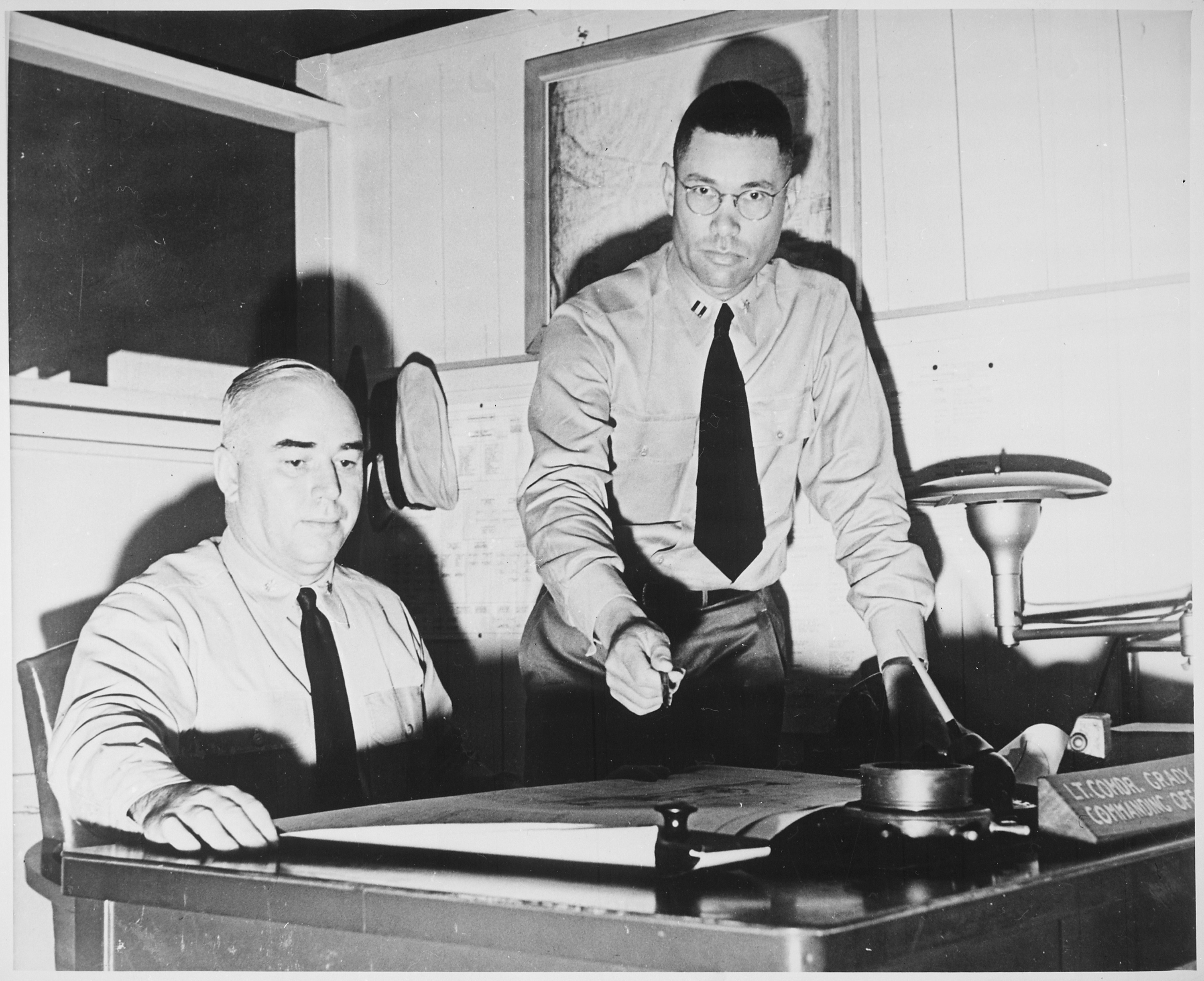
Lieutenant Hope at Manana Barracks, Hawaii.

In 1942 Dr. Hope was married with a new doctoral degree and a job at Howard University, a wife and one or two children. At 40 years old he was over the draft age. Nevertheless he registered with his local draft board on February 12. Two years later he was sworn in to the Civil Engineer Corps of the US Navy as a Lieutenant (the equivalent of an army captain), making him the highest-ranking Black officer in the navy.

He trained at Camp Endicott in Davisville, Rhode Island as part of the Seabees. Hope was assigned to the Manana Barracks at Pearl Harbor, Hawaii, as public works officer. Manana Barracks primarily housed Black sailors who served as stevedores on the navy docks, although both Black and White sailors were assigned to Lieutenant Hope in the public works division.

In December 1945 Hope flew to Okinawa where he was the first Black naval officer to serve as a member of a general court-martial board. This trip was his first opportunity to see places that had only recently been forward battle areas. In January 1946 Lieutenant Hope was transferred from Manana Barracks to the newly-opened Navy Pacific University. He was offered a promotion and reunification with his family in Hawaii if he would stay in the navy for at least another six months. He accepted the offer and soon became Director of Instruction at the university. His family joined him and he was promoted to lieutenant commander, making him the highest-ranking Black man in the history of the navy up to that time. During these months Mrs. Hope inspired the sailors there to collectively donate just over $500 to the United Negro College Fund in Washington DC. However the navy closed the university within a year and Lieutenant Commander Hope was reassigned as assistant public works officer at Pearl Harbor. He eventually returned to the continental U.S. with his family as part of leaving the navy and returning to civilian life.

Just as Hope was about to sign his separation papers in Anacostia, Maryland, he was ordered to report to Secretary of the Navy James Forrestal who would, the next year, become Defense Secretary and meet with representatives of the Black community and leaders of the armed forces to consider the issue of full integration of the military. Forrestal asked him whether he might like to remain in the navy. Lieutenant Commander Hope, however, was determined to return to civilian life, feeling that 47 years of age was rather late to begin a career in the regular navy. Nevertheless, Hope told Forrestal that he hoped younger blacks would seek careers as navy officers and that he would be willing to do whatever he could to encourage this. As a result of this offer, Lieutenant Commander Hope was sent on a speaking tour of Black colleges to "show the uniform" and explain the benefits of a career as a navy officer. A few years later at the invitation of the commanding general of the Ninth Air Force, Major General Willis Hale, he would attend a conference and tour Langley Air Force Base in 1950 with Howard University president Mordecai Johnson and eleven other representatives of the military and different universities. They had come to witness how the Air Force was integrating its forces during the post-war downsizing.

== University educator ==
Hope was finally released from active duty in February 1947. Dr. Hope returned to Howard University where he was hired as a professor of civil engineering. In 1951 he and his family left for what was expected to be a two-year stay as a faculty member of the American University of Beirut in Lebanon, departing on September 8 from the Port of New York. Dr. Hope was head of the engineering department by 1952. In 1956 Dr. Hope wrote to Dr. Martin Luther King Jr in support of his movement and to send a donation, saying that attitudes in the Middle East toward the United States were tied to how it treated its citizens of color. Seven years later, in 1963, he returned to Washington D.C. to participate in the March on Washington. That year he was also appointed dean of the Civil Engineering Department of the American University of Beirut. By 1969 he had returned to the U.S. to become an education program specialist with the U.S. Department of Health, Education and Welfare. He retired in 1975.

== Personal life ==
Dr. Hope's first wife was Marion Grace Conover. With her he had two sons; Edward Swain Hope Jr. and James Lynn Hope. Marion died in 1974, a year before Dr. Hope's retirement. Hope later married Louise Kent. Dr. Hope died June 8, 1990, in Cleveland, Ohio where he had moved after marrying Kent, as she was a resident there.
