= Charles L. Towle =

- Born: May 2, 1913
- Died: April 9, 1990 (aged 76)
- Engineering career
- Institutions: Mobile Post Office Society; Postal History Foundation
- Projects: Expert on railroad mail and mobile post offices
- Awards: APS Hall of Fame

Charles L. Towle (May 2, 1913 – April 9, 1990), of Arizona, was a stamp collector who studied postal history and wrote philatelic literature on the subject.

== Collecting interests ==
Towle was a collector of stamps and postal history, especially that of United States railroad mail and mobile post offices.

== Philatelic literature ==
Based on his studies, Towle co-authored with Henry Albert Meyer, and wrote Railroad Postmarks of the U.S., 1861–1886, and, in 1986, Towle wrote his four-volume United States Rates and Station Agent Markings. Towle wrote extensively on transit markings and received numerous awards for his efforts.

For three years, Towle edited The Heliograph, the journal of the Postal History Foundation.

== Philatelic activity ==
Towle was active in philatelic organizations, such as the Mobile Post Office Society, where he was president until he died, and as Chairman of the Board of the Western Postal History Museum, later renamed the Postal History Foundation.

== Honors and awards ==
Towle was named to the American Philatelic Society Hall of Fame in 1991.

== See also ==
- Philately
- Philatelic literature
- Postal history
