= Donald G. Iselin =

United States Navy rear admiral (1922–2012)

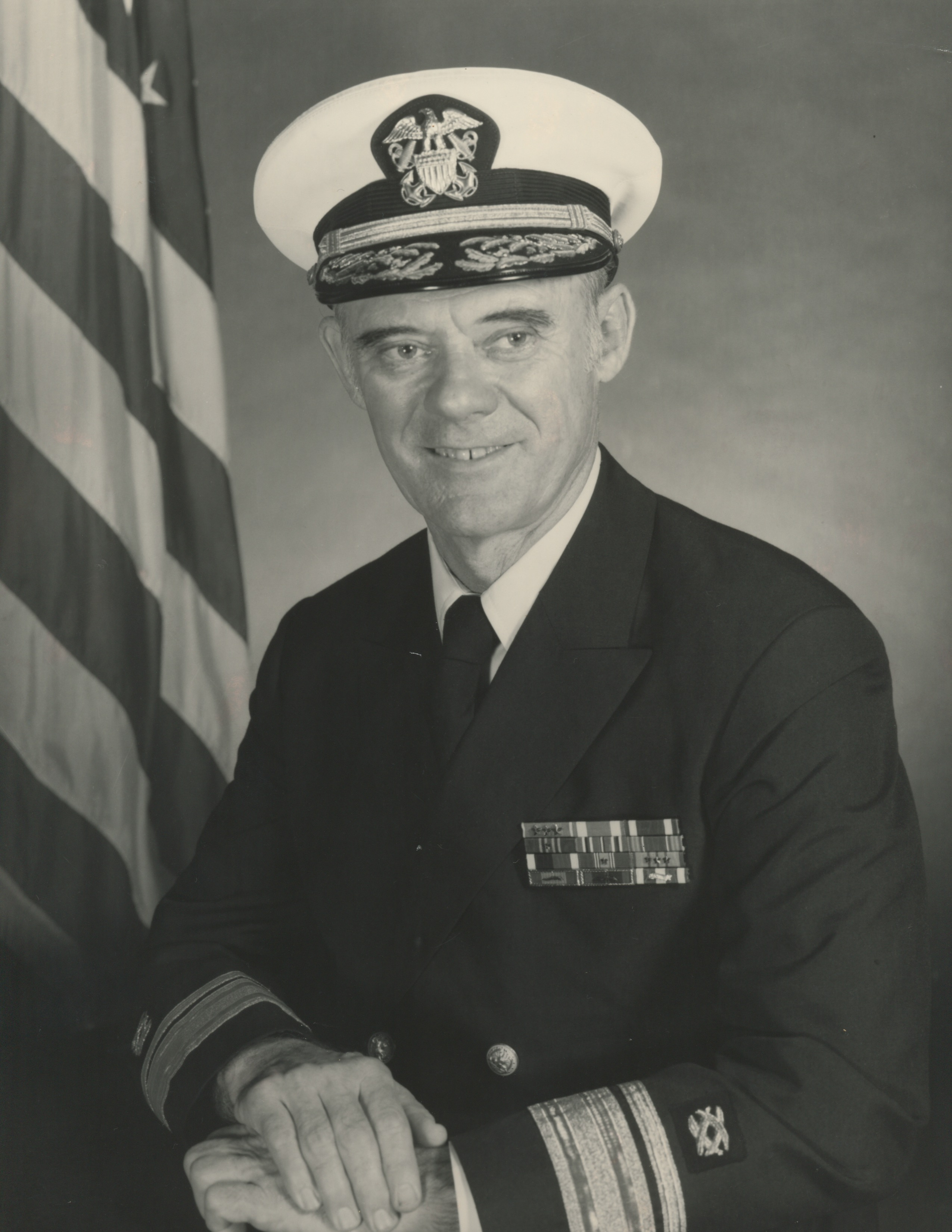
- Born: September 5, 1922; Racine, WI
- Died: March 9, 2012 (aged 89); Santa Barbara, CA
- Military career
- Allegiance: United States of America
- Branch: United States Navy
- Service years: 1945–1981
- Rank: Rear Admiral
- Nickname: Buddy
- Commands: Naval Facilities Engineering Command; NAVFAC Pacific
- Conflicts: WW2,Vietnam War
- Awards: Legion of Merit (3)

Donald Grote Iselin (September 22, 1922 – March 9, 2012) was a United States Navy rear admiral. He served as the 31st commanding officer of Naval Facilities Engineering Command from 1977 to 1981.

== Early life and education ==
Donald G. Iselin was born on September 5, 1922, in Racine, Wisconsin, to Harry and Rose (nee: Grote) Iselin. He had 2 younger brothers and a younger sister. He attended St. Catherine’s High School, graduating with the class of 1940.

After graduating high school, he attended Marquette University in the ROTC program. In 1942, he was chosen for appointment into the United States Naval Academy after he achieved the third highest score nationally among all ROTC cadets on the Naval exam. He graduated from Annapolis at the top of his class in 1945.

He graduated with a bachelor’s degree in civil engineering from Rensselaer Polytechnic Institute in January 1948 and earned his master’s degree in civil engineering in September of that same year. In 1971, he graduated from the Advanced Management Program at Harvard Business School.

== Naval career ==
In 1951, he was assigned his first major construction project manager, to build launch facilities at the U.S. Naval Air Missile Test Center at Point Mugu, CA. In 1953, he was assigned to the shipyards at Pearl Harbor, HI to the public works department.

In 1954, at the request of VADM Hyman Rickover, he was transferred, on loan, to the Atomic Energy Commission in Pittsburgh to help design and construct the Shippingport Atomic Power Station, the first of its kind.

One of Iselin’s most significant assignments was the 6 months he spent in Vietnam where he developed a new construction management system called “Level of Effort,” which improved project timelines.

He was promoted to Rear Admiral in March 1972 and assumed duties as the Commander of the Pacific Division, Naval Construction Battalions, Pacific Fleet.

In May 1977, he assumed duties as the 31st Commander of the Naval Facilities Engineering Command, and Chief of Civil Engineers until his retirement in 1981, after 38 years in the Navy.

=== Assignments ===
- 1950-1951 South Pacific Ocean, Atom Bomb Development Program - Technical Advisor
- 1951-1953 NAM Test Center, CA - Assistant Officer in Charge Construction
- 1953-1954 NS Pearl Harbor, HI - Engineering Officer, Naval Public Works Department
- 1954 -1958 Nuclear Power Station, PA - Site Project Officer, US Atomic Energy Commission
- 1958-1961 Port Hueneme, CA - Executive Officer/Assistant Director, Construction R&D
- 1961-1964 Washington D.C. - Director of the Marine Construction Division
- 1964 Guantanamo Bay, Cuba - Project Manager, Desalination Plant
- 1964-1965 Washington D.C. - Deputy Commander, Navy Yards/Dock Operations
- 1965-1967 Washington D.C. - Director – NAVFAC Programs Comptroller
- 1967-1968 Vietnam - Special Assistant/Deputy OICC, War Zone Construction
- 1968-1969 Davisville, RI/Gulfport, MS - Commander US Navy Seabees, Atlantic Fleet
- 1969-1972 - Deputy Commander, NAVFAC Military Facilities Planning, Worldwide
- 1972-1973 Vietnam - Commander NAVFAC Pacific Division, Warzone Planning
- 1973-1977 - Vice Commander NAVFAC, Military Engineering/Construction
- 1977-1981 - Commander NAVFAC/Chief of Civil Engineers

== Personal life and death ==
Admiral Iselin married his high school sweetheart, Jacqueline Mary Myers, in 1945 and had 4 children. They were married 63 years before her death in 2008. After retiring from the Navy in 1981, he joined the Raymond Kaiser Engineering as a group vice-president for 5 years. After retiring a second time, he worked as an independent contractor and construction consultant. He died on March 9, 2012, in Santa Barbara, CA.

== Honors and awards ==
- USNA Gardner L. Caskey Memorial Prize
- SAME 1958 Moreell Medal
- Navy League Stephen Decatur Award
- 4 Legion of Merit awards
- 1980 Engineering Alumni Professional Achievement Award Marquette University
- Election into the National Academy of Engineering
- Honorary member of the American Institute of Architects
- Racine St. Catherine's Alumni Hall of Fame 2005
