= Henry Albert Meyer =

Stamp collector

- Born: March 23, 1894
- Died: March 25, 1968 (aged 74)
- Organization(s): U.S. Philatelic Classics Society; National Philatelic Museum
- Known for: postal history of river and steamboat mail
- Awards: APS Hall of Fame

Henry Albert Meyer (March 23, 1894 – March 25, 1968) of Indiana, was a philatelist who created notable stamp and postal history collections, and wrote and co-authored a number of philatelic books.

== Collecting interests ==
Meyer was famous for a number of collections he formed, especially for his Ohio River steamboat covers. his Confederate States of America postal history collection, and his Hawaii collection.

== Philatelic literature ==
Based on his study of river and steamboat history, he wrote Domestic Waterway Mail Markings in 1951. Along with Rear Admiral Frederic R. Harris and others, he co-authored Hawaii, Its Stamps and Postal History, which was published in 1948. Meyer co-authored with Dr. Carroll Chase to write The Postal History of the Kingdom of Westphalia Under Napoleon, 1807-1814 (published in 1958), and co-authored with Charles L. Towle to write Railroad Postmarks of the United States, 1861-1866, which was published in 1968.

== Philatelic activity ==
Meyer was a member of the U.S. Philatelic Classics Society, and, at the National Philatelic Museum in Philadelphia, he was Program Chairman of the Perforation Centennial held in July 1957.

== Honors and awards ==
Meyer was named to the American Philatelic Society Hall of Fame in 1969.

== See also ==
- Philately
- Philatelic literature
