= Bureau of Yards and Docks =

Former bureau of the U.S. Navy (1842-1966)

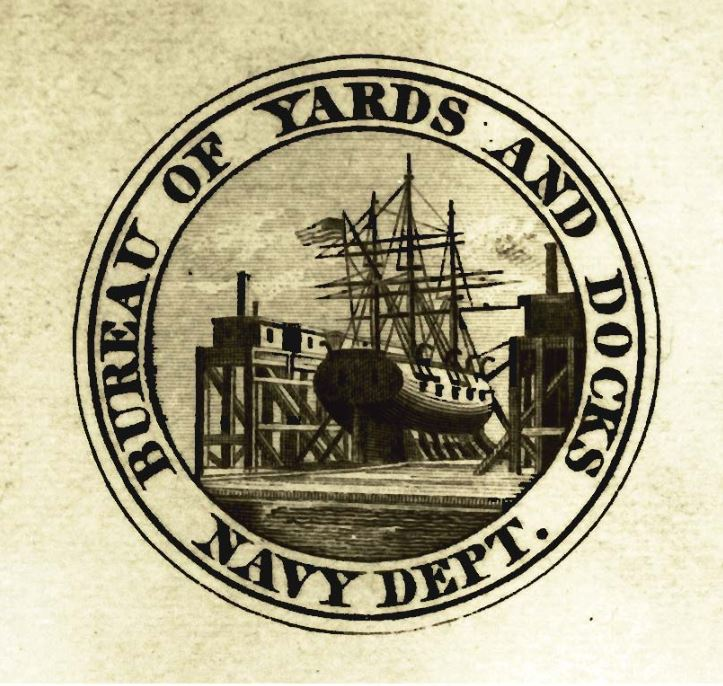

Agency overview
- Formed: August 31, 1842
- Dissolved: May 1, 1966
- Jurisdiction: United States
- Parent department: Department of the Navy

The Bureau of Yards and Docks (abbrev.: BuDocks) was the branch of the United States Navy responsible from 1842 to 1966 for building and maintaining navy yards, drydocks, and other facilities relating to ship construction, maintenance, and repair.

The Bureau was established on August 31, 1842 by an act of Congress (5 Stat. 579), as one of the five bureaus replacing the Board of Naval Commissioners established in 1815. Originally established as the Bureau of Naval Yards and Docks, the branch was renamed the Bureau of Yards and Docks in 1862.

The Bureau was abolished effective in 1966 as part of the Department of Defense's reorganization of its material establishment, being replaced by the Naval Facilities Engineering Command (NAVFAC).

== Chiefs of the Bureau ==
List of Chiefs of the Bureau of Yards and Docks
#	Image	Name	Rank	Term start	Term end
1		Lewis Warrington	Captain	1842	1846
2		Joseph Smith	Captain	1846	1869
3		Daniel Ammen	Captain	1869	1871
4		Christopher R. P. Rodgers	Commodore	1871	1874
5		John C. Howell	Commodore	1874	1878
6		Richard L. Law	Commodore	1878	1881
7		Edward T. Nichols	Rear Admiral	1881	1885
8		David B. Harmony	Commodore	1885	1889
9		George D. White	Commodore	1889	1890
10		Norman H. Farquhar	Commodore	1890	1894
11		Edmund O. Matthews	Commodore	1894	1898
12		Mordecai T. Endicott	Rear Admiral	1898	1907
13		Harry H. Rousseau	Lieutenant	1907	1907
14		Richard C. Hollyday	Rear Admiral	1907	1912
15		Homer R. Stanford	Rear Admiral	1912	1916
16		Frederick R. Harris	Rear Admiral	1916	1917
17		Charles W. Parks	Rear Admiral	1918	1921
18		Luther E. Gregory	Rear Admiral	1921	1929
19		Archibald L. Parsons	Rear Admiral	1929	1933
20		Norman M. Smith	Rear Admiral	1933	1937
21		Ben Moreell	Rear Admiral	1937	1945
22		John J. Manning	Rear Admiral	1945	1949
23		Joseph F. Jelley, Jr.	Rear Admiral	1949	1953
24		John R. Perry	Rear Admiral	1953	1955
25		Robert H. Meade	Rear Admiral	1955	1959
26		Eugene J. Peltier	Rear Admiral	1959	1962
27		Peter Corradi	Rear Admiral	1962	1965
28		Alexander C. Husband	Rear Admiral	1965	1966

Naval Facilities Engineering Command

List of Commanders of the Naval Facilities Engineering Command
#	Image	Name	Rank	Term start	Term end
29		Walter Enger	Rear Admiral	1969	1973
30		Albert R. Marschall	Rear Admiral	1973	1977
31		Donald G. Iselin	Rear Admiral	1977	1981
32		William M. Zobel	Rear Admiral	1981	1984
33		John Paul Jones Jr.	Rear Admiral	1984	1987
34		Benjamin F. Montoya	Rear Admiral	1987	1989
35		David E. Bottorff	Rear Admiral	1989	1992
36		Jack E. Buffington	Rear Admiral	1992	1995
37		David J. Nash	Rear Admiral	1995	1998
38		Louis M. Smith	Rear Admiral	1998	2000
39		Michael R. Johnson	Rear Admiral	2000	2003
40		Michael K. Loose	Rear Admiral	2003	2006
41		Wayne G. Shear	Rear Admiral	2006	2010
42		Christopher J. Mossey	Rear Admiral	2010	2012
43		Katherine L. Gregory	Rear Admiral	2012	2014

Naval Facilities Engineering Systems Command

List of Commanders of the Naval Facilities Engineering Systems Command
#	Image	Name	Rank	Term start	Term end
44		Bret J. Muilenburg	Rear Admiral	2015	2018
45		John W. Korka	Rear Admiral	2018	present

== See also ==
- United States Navy bureau system
