= Wayne G. Shear Jr. =

Wayne Shear Jr.
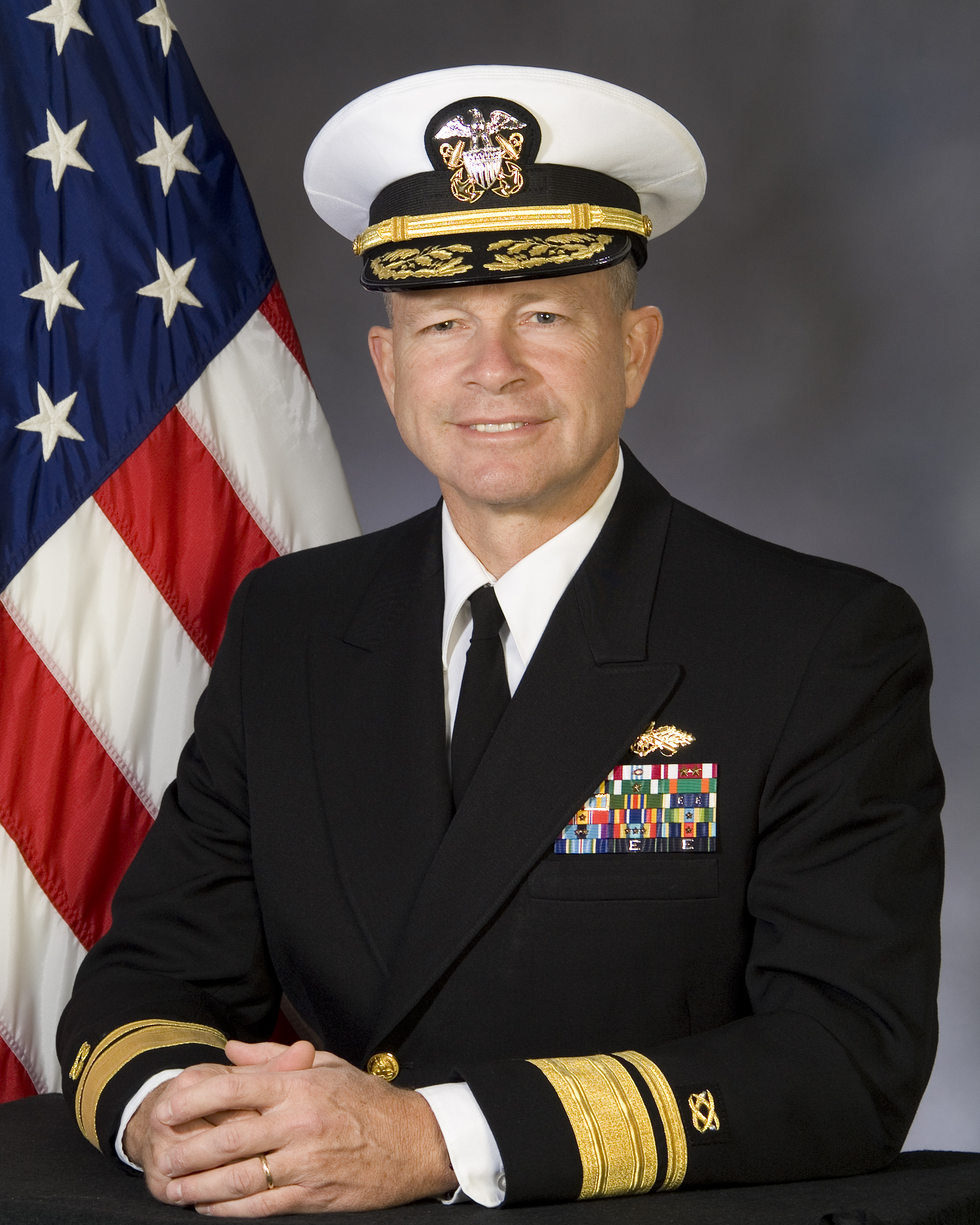
- Rear Admiral Wayne Shear Jr.
- Born: March 24, 1957 (age 69); Atlanta, Georgia, United States
- Military career
- Allegiance: United States of America
- Branch: United States Navy
- Service years: 1979–2010
- Rank: Rear Admiral (Upper Half)
- Nickname: Greg
- Commands: Chief of Civil Engineers; Naval Facilities Engineering Command
- Awards: Legion of Merit (3); Defense Meritorious Service Medal (2); Meritorious Service Medal (3); Navy Commendation Medal (2); Navy Achievement Medal

Rear Admiral (Upper Half) Wayne "Greg" Shear Jr. is a former Chief of Civil Engineers for the United States Navy. He previously served as Deputy Commander for Operations, Naval Facilities Engineering Command.

== Biography ==
Shear assumed command of Naval Facilities Engineering Command, Washington, D.C., and became Chief of Civil Engineers on October 27, 2006. He served in this capacity until he retired in May 2010. Previously, he served as the Director, Ashore Readiness Division (N46) Staff of the Chief of Naval Operations and as Deputy Commander, Navy Installations Command.

Shear graduated from the United States Naval Academy in 1979 with a degree in Naval Architecture and was commissioned an Ensign in the Civil Engineer Corps. In 1984 he received a Master of Science in Civil Engineering from the University of Colorado. He also holds a Master of Arts in National Security and Strategic Studies from the Naval War College.

Shear's first assignment was to the Public Works Department, Naval Weapons Station Yorktown, Virginia. He then served as Public Works Officer, Naval Hospital Beaufort, South Carolina After graduate school in Colorado, he was assigned as Aide to the Commander, Naval Facilities Engineering Command. In 1985, Shear joined Naval Mobile Construction Battalion (NMCB) 5 where he served as Charlie Company Commander and Officer in Charge, Detail Subic Bay.

He then served at the Civil Engineer Corps Officer School as an instructor in the Facilities Management Division. In 1989 he was assigned as Resident Officer in Charge of Construction, Puerto Rico Area. In 1993 he graduated with distinction from the College of Naval Command and Staff in Newport, Rhode Island, and was assigned to U.S. Strategic Command at Offutt Air Force Base, Nebraska, as Chief, Engineering Branch. Shear commanded NMCB 1 from 1996 to 1998. NMCB 1 received the Atlantic Fleet "Best of Type" and the Peltier Award in FY-97.

Shear subsequently served as the executive officer at Naval Facilities Engineering Command's Southern Division in Charleston, South Carolina, and the Commander, 30th Naval Construction Regiment, Pearl Harbor, Hawaii and Vice Commander, Third Naval Construction Brigade. While with the Seabees, Shear served on a temporary assignment as Commander, U.S. Support Group, East Timor, reporting to U.S. Pacific Command. In his following assignment he served as Deputy Commander for Operations, Naval Facilities Engineering Command.

Shear is a Seabee Combat Warfare Officer, a registered professional engineer in the Commonwealth of Virginia, a member of the Navy Acquisition Professional Community, and a member of the Society of American Military Engineers.

Shear is spending his retirement time as a professor at the Virginia Military Institute, Lexington, teaching project and construction management. He is said to strive for excellent in each of his classes and maintains an Open Door Policy.

== Awards and decorations ==
Shears' awards include:

Legion of Merit (with two award stars)
Defense Meritorious Service Medal (with one award star)
Meritorious Service Medal (with two award stars)
Navy Commendation Medal (with one award star)
Navy Achievement Medal
