= Katherine L. Gregory =

United States Navy rear admiral

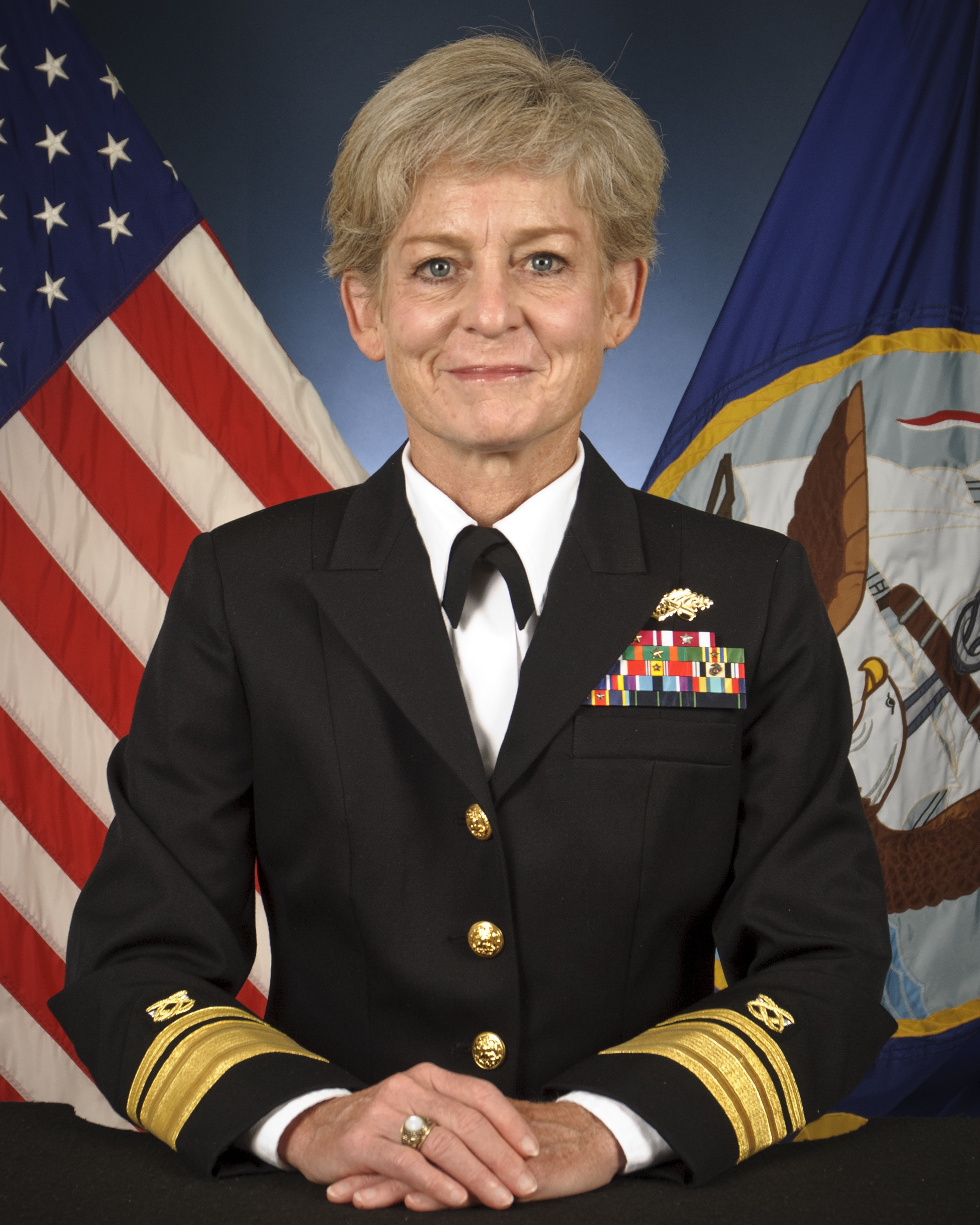
- Rear Admiral Katherine L. Gregory, Commander, Naval Facilities Engineering Command and Chief of Civil Engineers, United States Navy
- Born: January 27, 1961 (age 65); St. Louis, Missouri, U.S.
- Military career
- Allegiance: United States of America
- Branch: United States Navy
- Service years: 1978–2015
- Rank: Rear Admiral
- Nicknames: Kate, Combat Kate
- Commands: Naval Facilities Engineering Command; Naval Facilities Engineering Command Pacific; Naval Mobile Construction Battalion 133
- Awards: Legion of Merit, Meritorious Service Medal, Navy and Marine Corps Commendation Medal, Navy and Marine Corps Achievement Medal

Rear Admiral Katherine Louise Gregory (born January 27, 1961) is the first female flag officer in the United States Navy Civil Engineer Corps (CEC). She assumed command of Naval Facilities Engineering Command (NAVFAC) Pacific on July 9, 2010, and took command of all NAVFAC as the highest-ranked civil engineer in the navy in 2012. In November 2015, RADM Gregory was succeeded by RADM Bret J. Muilenburg.

== Background and education ==
Katherine L. Gregory is a native of St. Louis, Missouri. She attended Parkway North High School before graduating from the United States Naval Academy in 1982.

Gregory holds undergraduate and graduate degrees from the U.S. Naval Academy, the University of Southern California, and George Washington University. She has completed the Senior Executive Program at the London School of Business, is a registered professional engineer in the Commonwealth of Virginia, and is a qualified military parachutist and Seabee combat warfare officer.

== Navy career ==
Gregory's first assignment was in Yokosuka, Japan as the assistant Resident Officer In Charge of Construction (ROICC). From there she moved to Naples, Italy to serve as the engineering and planning officer.

In 1986, Gregory began her first tour with the Seabees, serving as a company commander, assistant operations officer and detachment officer in charge with Amphibious Construction Battalion One, homeported in Coronado, California. She then transferred to Washington, D.C., serving as a Seabee action officer at the Naval Facilities Engineering Command (NAVFAC) headquarters.

In 1991 Gregory moved to San Francisco, California, first as the resident officer in charge of construction, and then as the shore facility environmental compliance officer. She left the Bay Area for the Aleutian Islands to serve as the Naval Air Station Adak public works officer.

In 1995 Gregory returned to the Seabees, serving as the executive officer of Naval Mobile Construction Battalion 1 (NMCB-1), homeported in Gulfport, Mississippi, and deploying to the Western Pacific and the Mediterranean. After a tour in Washington D.C. as the chief of naval operations overseas bases planning & action officer, she went back to the Naval Construction Force, assuming command of NMCB-133, deploying throughout the Western Pacific and Mediterranean.

In 1999 Gregory reported to Naples, Italy as the officer in charge of construction, responsible for construction of a new support base and hospital. Her follow on tour was to Hawaii as the executive officer of Navy Public Works Center and NAVFAC Hawaii. Gregory then served as a Department of Defense corporate fellow, working with the Southern Company in Atlanta, Georgia.

In May 2006, she assumed command of the 30th Naval Construction Regiment in Port Hueneme, California. She reported for duty as chief of staff at the First Naval Construction Division in Norfolk, Virginia, in July 2008. Gregory was promoted to the rank of rear admiral on June 1, 2010, and assumed command of NAVFAC Pacific, in Pearl Harbor, Hawaii on July 9, 2010. NAVFAC Pacific is a command of approximately 4,000 military and civilian men and women who work for NAVFAC Pacific and its three Facilities Engineering Commands in Hawaii, Guam, and Japan.

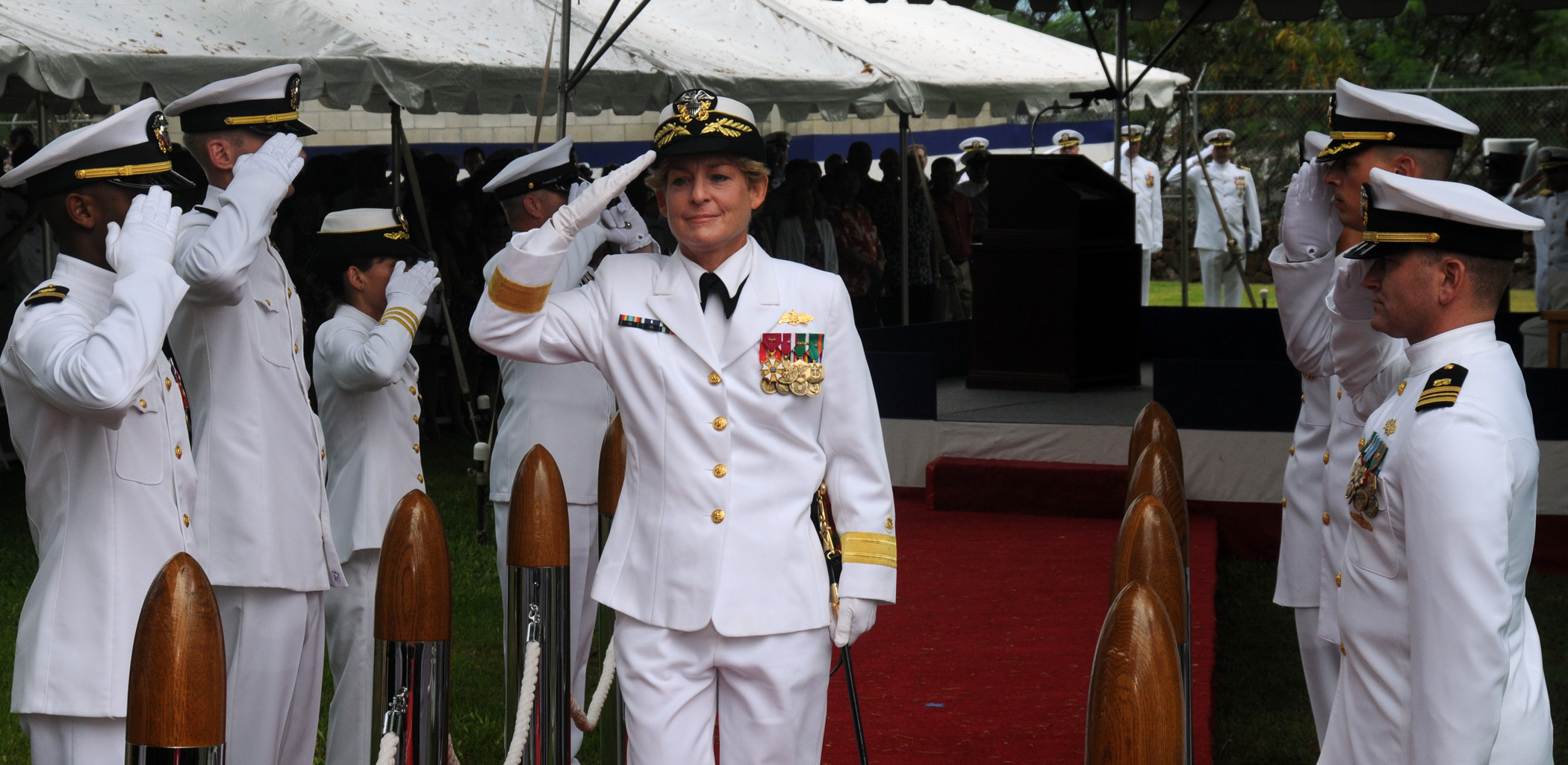
Rear Adm. Kate Gregory walks through the sideboys after assuming command of Naval Facilities Engineering Command (NAVFAC) Pacific during the change of command ceremony at NAVFAC Pacific Headquarters July 9, 2010.

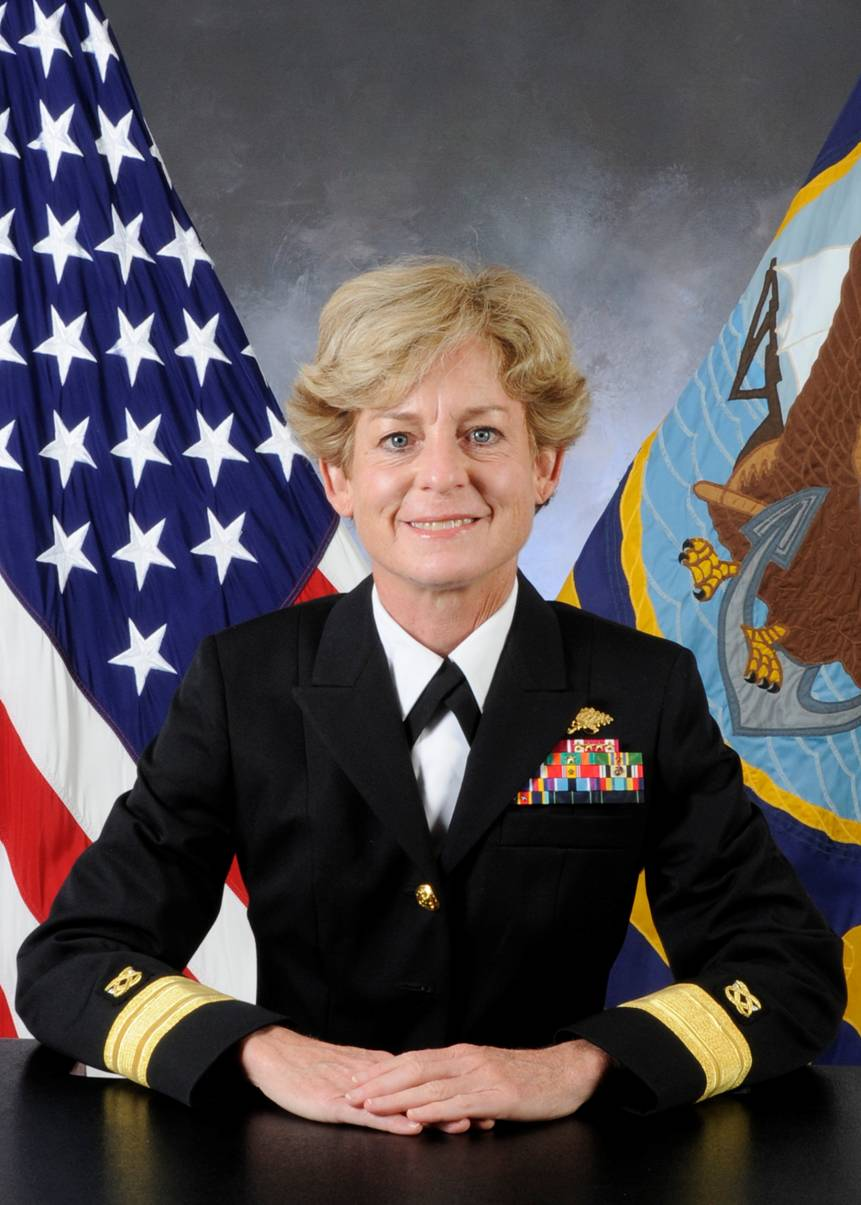
Gregory as a Rear Admiral (Lower Half)

== Awards and decorations ==
Her personal decorations include the Legion of Merit, Meritorious Service Medal, Navy and Marine Corps Commendation Medal, Navy and Marine Corps Achievement Medal.

== Academic career ==
Gregory was named Iowa State University's first senior vice president for university services in July 2016 and served until her resignation in November 2017.

== See also ==
- Women in the United States Navy
- Civil Engineer Corps
