= Naval tradition =

A naval tradition is a tradition that is, or has been, observed in one or more navies.

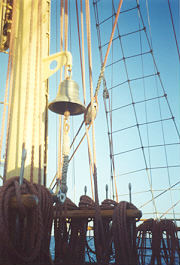
Ship bell of ORP Iskra II - Polish Navy school tall ship

A basic tradition is that all ships commissioned in a navy are referred to as ships rather than vessels, with the exception of submarines, which are known as boats. The prefix on a ship's name indicates that it is a commissioned ship. For example, USS is an initialism that expands to United States Ship; in the Royal Navy, HMS expands to His Majesty's Ship (or when a Queen reigns, Her Majesty's Ship); in the Indian Navy, INS expands to Indian Navy Ship, and so forth.

An important tradition on board British naval vessels (and later those of the U.S. and other nations) has been the ship's bell. This was historically used to mark the passage of time on board a vessel, including the duration of four-hour watches. They were also employed as warning devices in heavy fog, and for alarms and ceremonies. The bell was originally kept polished first by the ship's cook, then later by a person belonging to that division of the ship's personnel.

Another important tradition is that of Piping someone aboard the ship. This was originally used to give orders on warships when shouted orders could not have been heard. The piping was done by the ship's boatswain and therefore the instrument is known as the boatswain's Pipe or boatswain's call. The two tones it gives and the number of blasts given off, signify the order given. It is also used in a ceremonial way, i.e., to "pipe" someone aboard the ship — usually captains, including the ship's captain, and more senior officers.

By English tradition, ships have been referred to as a "she". However, it was long considered bad luck to permit women to sail on board naval vessels. To do so would invite a terrible storm that would wreck the ship. The only women that were welcomed on board were figureheads mounted on the prow of the ship. In spite of these views, some women did serve on board naval vessels, usually as wives of crewmembers.

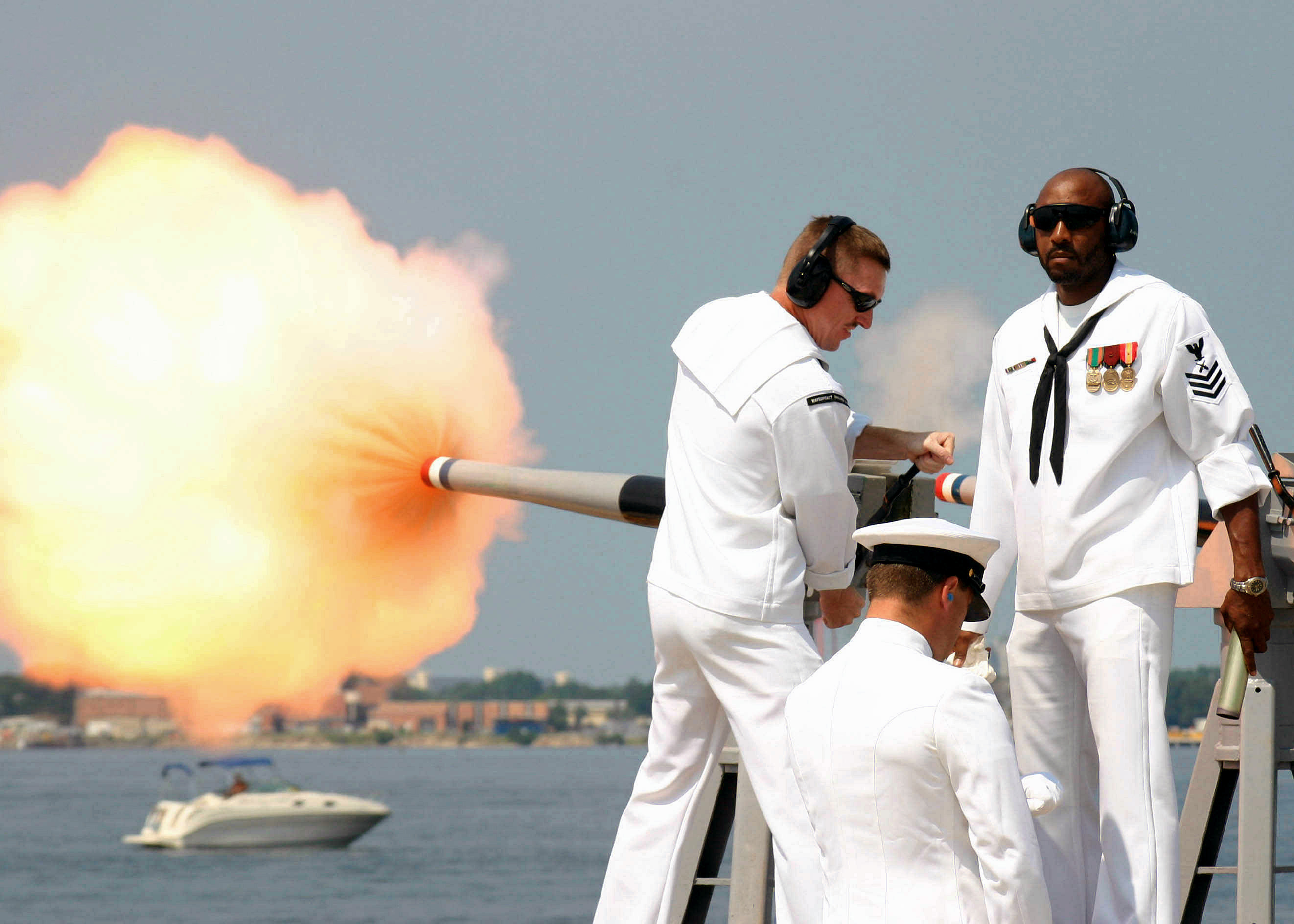
A cannon on a naval vessel's deck fired during the arrival of a dignitary.

The custom of firing cannon salutes originated in the British Royal Navy. When a cannon is fired, it partially disarms the ship, so firing a cannon for no combat reason showed respect and trust. The British, as the dominant naval power, compelled the ships of weaker nations to make the first salute. As the tradition evolved, the number of cannon fired became an indication of the rank of the official being saluted.

== By country ==
=== United Kingdom ===
Commissioned ships and submarines of the Royal Navy wear the White Ensign at the stern whilst alongside during daylight hours and at the main-mast whilst under way. When alongside, the Union Jack, as distinct from the Union Flag, is flown from the jackstaff at the bow, but can be flown underway in only special circumstances.

A fleet review is a tradition of assembling the fleet before the monarch. In June 2005, to mark the bi-centenary of the Battle of Trafalgar, 167 ships of the RN, and 30 other nations, were present at a fleet review.

The naval salute differs from the military salute in that it has the palm turned down, rather than outwards.

The RN has evolved a rich volume of slang, known as Jack-speak. Nowadays the British sailor is usually Jack (or Jenny) rather than the more historical Jack Tar. Nicknames for a British sailor, applied by others, include Matelot (pronounced "matlow"), and Limey – mainly redundant in use within the Royal Navy. Royal Marines are fondly known as Bootnecks or often just as Royals. Nicknames for the service include The Andrew or Andrew Miller (of uncertain origin, possibly after a zealous press ganger) and The Senior Service as the oldest of the military branches. Within the Merchant Navy the Royal Navy is known as The Grey Funnel Line.
