= Frederic R. Harris =

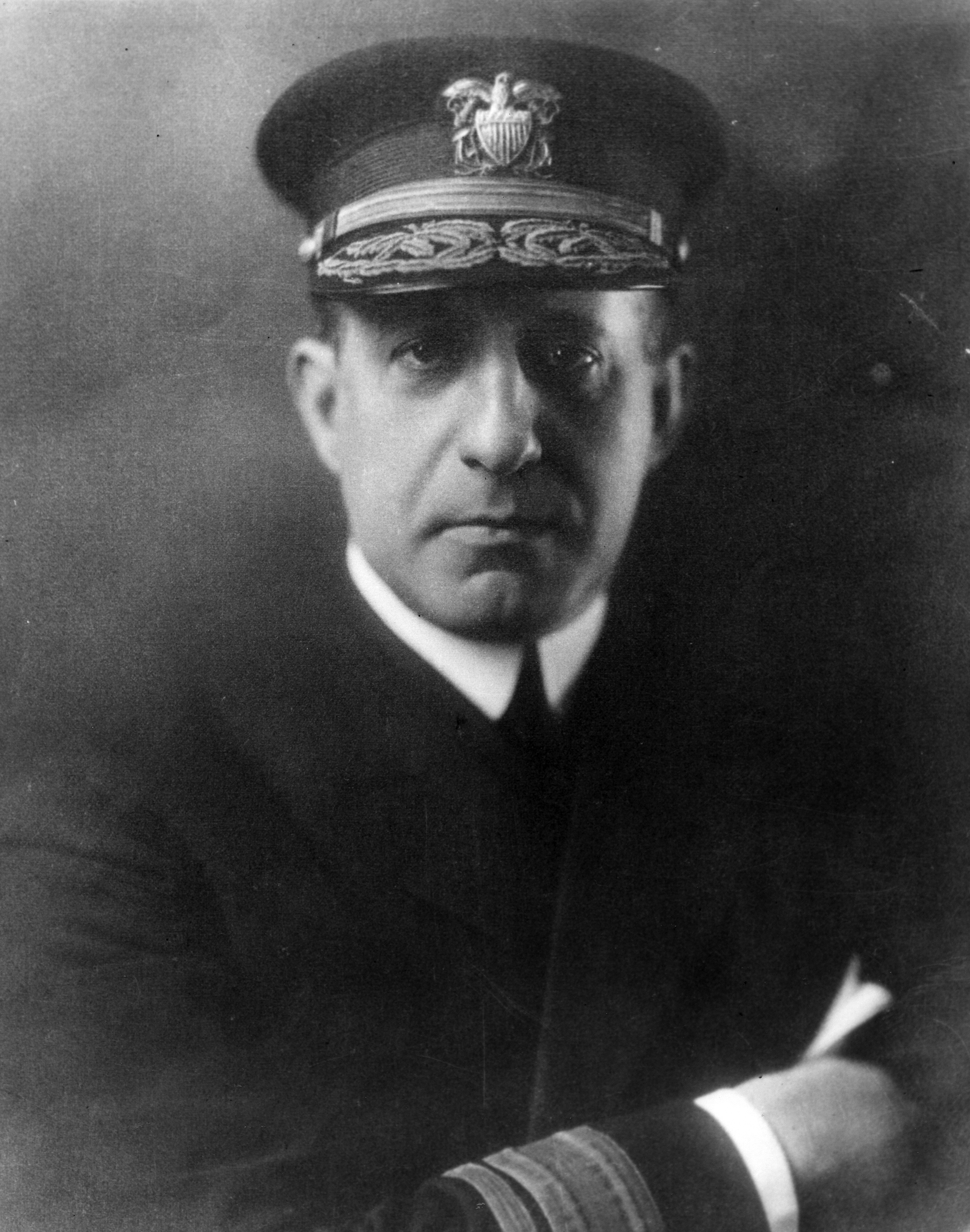
- Born: April 10, 1875
- Died: July 20, 1949 (aged 74)
- Education: Stevens Institute of Technology
- Engineering career
- Institutions: Philatelic Foundation
- Projects: Famous for his collection of rare Hawaiian postage stamps
- Awards: APS Hall of Fame

Rear Admiral Frederic R. Harris (April 10, 1875 – July 20, 1949), of New York City, was a naval engineer specializing in docks and port facilities. He was also a philatelist who amassed some of the finest collections in philatelic history.

== Early life ==
Harris went to public schools and then the College of the City of New York. He transferred to the Stevens Institute of Technology, graduating in 1896 with a degree in mechanical engineering, although his focus was in civil engineering.

He was active in many extra-curricular activities at Stevens.

== Naval career ==
In 1903 he decided to join the US Navy, entering with a rank of Lt (JG) in the Navy Civil Engineer Corps (CEC). He was immediately assigned to projects at the New York Navy Yard as Assistant Engineer, rebuilding dry dock #2 and other facilities.

He was assigned as principal assistant in charge of construction in Charleston Navy Yard. The contractor was attempting to use sub-grade materials and threatened him with transfer if he didn’t allow the use of these materials. He stood his ground, and was subsequently transferred to Key West. But local papers focused on the story of a young man doing his best for the country and that got the attention of President Theodore Roosevelt – the orders were rescinded and the company backed down. Harris continued to do exemplary work at Charleston.

In the early 1910’s, two major dry dock projects were beset with problems. The “Hoodoo Dry Dock” at the Brooklyn Navy Yard had a major structure failure during construction. Several methods had been tried, unsuccessfully. Harris was consulted and he recommended a heavy reinforced concrete solution for building on deep shifting sands. The solution worked, and the dry dock was completed in 1912.

In the second case, problems were encountered in the construction of the new Dry Dock No. 1 at Pearl Harbor, Hawaii. This was to be a 1001’ dock with a 32’ depth of water to the keel blocks, again with major hydrostatic design issues. Harris was a member of a consulting team led by Alfred Nobel (the American engineer), and he provided the key ideas and insights to resolve the issue and successfully complete the dock. This dock was of course very important in recovering from the Japanese bombing attack on Dec 7, 1941, when 7 battleships were sunk or damaged. Several of the battleships were raised and partially repaired in the Dock #1 before going to the west coast for complete repairs.

In 1913, Lt. Harris was promoted to Lt. Commander. He continued his work in New York and added additional duties in Philadelphia – in charge of public works at the Philadelphia Navy Yard. His ability to see a problem and solve it, and to design and construct appropriate solutions came to the attention of key people. A Brooklyn congressional delegation recommended to the Navy that he be appointed as the next Chief for the Navy’s Bureau of Yards and Docks.

The recommendation was quickly implemented. On January 17, 1916, President Woodrow Wilson appointed Lt. Commander Harris as Chief of the Bureau of Yards and Docks. This included a promotion, skipping the ranks of Commander and Captain, to Rear Admiral. The youngest admiral in the Navy, at age 41. Harris was now in charge of the most influential of the Navy’s 5 bureaus – including the Bureau of Construction and Repair (ships), Bureau of Ordnance. This put him in charge of a large percentage ($100M out of $330M or 30%) of the total US defense budget at that time. And just in time for World War I.

Admiral Harris was responsible for a number of large projects during World War I, and was awarded the Navy Cross for his services. In addition to a new Philadelphia dry dock and various other projects, Harris collaborated with Franklin D. Roosevelt on a plan to place a mine barrier across the North Sea, from the Orkney islands to the Norwegian coast. This was implemented and successfully reduced the ability of the German Navy to operate submarines in the North Atlantic.

== Civilian engineering career ==
Harris retired in 1927 to form the Frederic R. Harris Inc., Consulting Engineers, company. When World War II started in December 1941, the Bureau of Yards and Docks knew exactly where to go to design and engineer a large floating dry dock that could be positioned near the battle zones in the South Pacific. Harris utilized his concept of a Central Buoyancy Chamber as the enabling feature to produce a self-supporting design for a mobile dry dock, the Advanced Base Sectional Dock (ABSD, or later, AFDB). It included all the facilities needed to support the crew, manage operations, communications, and basic ship repairs – hull, structural, plumbing, electrical, etc. Routine maintenance, plus damage from kamikazes, bombs, shells, torpedoes and other mishaps such as collisions.

During WWII, the company grew to 600 employees, with many port and facility projects. Even Admiral Husband E. Kimmel (CINCPACFLT on Dec 7 1941) worked with Admiral Harris – Kimmel knew a great deal about the internal design of battleships that Harris found valuable in designing the ABSDs. They later collaborated on post-war proposals for naval facilities.

== Notable patents ==
Harris was responsible for a number of innovative designs in floating dry dock engineering. His patent for a central buoyancy chamber (US Patent 2,291,077) led directly do his patent for a "Multiple Unit Floating Dry Dock (US Patent 2,379,904, April 1943) that was the basis for the U.S. Navy's Advanced Base Sectional Docks (ABSD, or later, AFDB) used in World War II.

== Collecting interests ==
Harris was famous for his collection of Hawaii postage stamps. Along with Henry Albert Meyer, William J. Davey, John K. Bash and others. he co-authored Hawaii, Its Stamps and Postal History in 1948. In addition to his Hawaii collection, Harris had created world-class collections of stamps of Ceylon and Italian States.

== Philatelic activity ==
Harris was a founder and trustee of the Philatelic Foundation, and, at the time of his death, he was serving as president and expert. Harris was also the chairman of the Directing Committee for the 1936 Third International Philatelic Exhibition (TIPEX) and chairman of the 1947 Centenary International Stamp Exhibition (CIPEX).

== Honors and awards ==
Admiral Harris was elected to the American Philatelic Society Hall of Fame in 1950.

Harris was awarded an Honorary Doctor of Engineering degree by the Stevens Institute in 1921.

Awarded the Navy Cross for exceptionally meritorious service in a duty of great responsibility as Chief of the Bureau of Yards and Docks, World War I.

== See also ==
- Philately
- Philatelic literature
