= John R. Perry (admiral) =

Rear admiral of the United States Navy

John Richard Perry
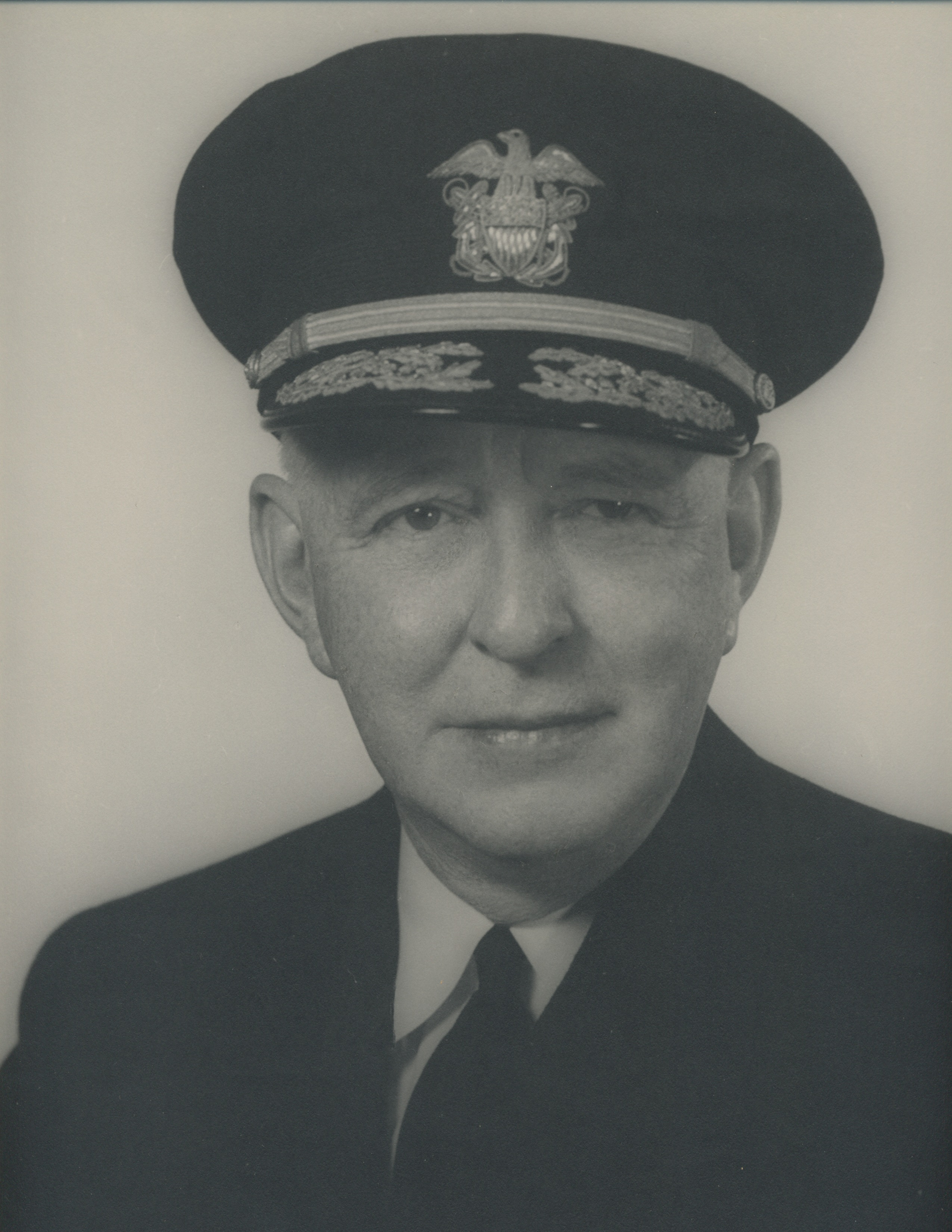
- Born: May 24, 1899; Waco, Texas
- Died: September 25, 1955 (aged 56)
- Burial place: Naval Academy Cemetery, Annapolis, Maryland
- Military career
- Allegiance: United States of America
- Branch: United States Navy
- Service years: 1917–1955
- Rank: Rear Admiral
- Conflicts: World War I World War II
- Awards: Legion of Merit (2)

John Richard Perry (24 May 1899 – 25 September 1955) was a rear admiral of the United States Navy during and after World War II.

== Biography ==
Perry was born in Waco, Texas. He enlisted into the Navy for service in World War I, then entered the Naval Academy and was commissioned as an ensign on 8 June 1923. After serving in the destroyer Marcus, he earned a master's degree in civil engineering at Rensselaer Polytechnic Institute. He then served in the Bureau of Yards and Docks; in Cuba, the Great Lakes region, Florida, and the Philippines. He returned to the Bureau of Yards and Docks in 1938 and in 1941 became Director of Administration and Personnel. In this post he performed with such proficiency that he was awarded the Legion of Merit for remarkable initiative and excellent judgment in recruiting, organizing, training, equipping and distributing to outlying bases, the Navy's construction battalions. In the course of a year he made available for service in the field some 70,000 men who formed a vital component part of American military organization in World War II.

In 1944 Perry became Officer in Charge of the 2nd Naval Construction Brigade with additional duty on the staff of Commander Service Force, U.S. Pacific Fleet. The following year, he additionally became Commander, Construction Troops of the 7th Fleet. He was awarded a second Legion of Merit for the development of the Leyte-Samar area into a large naval base, Leyte-Samar Naval Base, and assisting in the planning and construction of an air station, air strips, a fleet hospital, the Navy Receiving Station at Tubabao, a Navy Supply Depot, an ammunition depot and a ship repair base at Manicani. Through his engineering ingenuity, he greatly improved transportation facilities, sanitary installations and water supply lines, lines of communication, housing accommodations, storehouses and dumps, docking facilities and dredging operations.

At the close of World War II, Perry became Public Works Officer at the Naval Academy until 1948. He then was designated Assistant Chief for Operations in the Bureau of Yards and Docks. In July 1951 he assumed command of the Naval Construction Battalion Center Port Hueneme, California. From June to October 1953, he served as Director of the Pacific and Alaskan Division, Bureau of Yards and Docks, with headquarters at San Francisco. He then became Chief of Civil Engineers of the Navy and Chief of the Bureau of Yards and Docks, Navy Department, serving until he died of a heart attack on 25 September 1955.

Rear Admiral John R. Perry is buried in the Naval Academy Cemetery, Annapolis, Maryland.

The destroyer escort USS John R. Perry (DE-1034) was named in his honor.

== John Perry Jr. ==
On 7 June 2009, Dateline NBC aired an episode about Perry's son, John Perry Jr. A lifelong con artist, Perry had claimed to be a retired Rear Admiral and a recipient of the Navy Cross, the Purple Heart, the Navy Distinguished Service Medal, and the Medal of Honor. He was convicted in 1990 of attempting to murder his then-wife in order to conceal his deception.
