= Direct commission officer =

Person who has received high military rank without attending an academy or training

A direct commission officer (DCO) is a United States uniformed officer who has received an appointed commission without the typical prerequisites for achieving a commission, such as attending a four-year service academy, a four-year or two-year college ROTC program, or one of the officer candidate school or officer training school programs, the latter OCS/OTS programs typically are slightly over three months in length.

Civilians who have special skills that are critical to sustaining military operations, supporting troops, health and scientific study may receive a direct commission upon entering service. These officers usually occupy leadership positions in the following areas: law, science, medicine, pharmacy, dentistry, nurse corps, intelligence, supply-logistics-transportation, engineering, public affairs, chaplain corps, oceanography, merchant marine affairs, and others.

The U.S. Navy, U.S. Air Force and U.S. Coast Guard have more extensive active and reserve component DCO programs than the other three U.S. armed services.

The U.S. Marine Corps does not offer a DCO program presently; Navy officers provide medical and chaplain services, and chief warrant officers (CWO) and limited duty officers (LDO) serve as occupational field experts.

The U.S. Public Health Service Commissioned Corps and the National Oceanic and Atmospheric Administration Commissioned Officer Corps exclusively use a DCO program to commission their officers.

Depending on his or her specialization and duty status, a DCO attends either Officer Indoctrination School (OIS), Officer Development School (ODS), Direct Commission Course (DCC), or Direct Commission Officer School (DCO School), which vary from two weeks in duration for certain reserve DCOs to five weeks in duration for active-duty DCOs.

== U.S. Army Active and Reserve Direct Commission Officers ==
=== Overview ===
The Direct Commissioning Program (DCP) of the United States Army is a program that allows individuals with specialized skills and education to join the Army as officers without having to go through the traditional Officer Candidate School (OCS) or Reserve Officers' Training Corps (ROTC) programs.

==== Eligibility ====
The DCP is open to individuals with specialized skills and education in fields such as medicine, law, ministry, engineering, and cyber operations. Applicants must be U.S. citizens, at least 18 years old, and have completed the appropriate education and training for their chosen career field.

==== Process ====
The DCP application process involves submitting an application package that includes a resume, transcripts, letters of recommendation, and other required documents. Applicants will also undergo a security clearance and background check. Once accepted, they will attend a six-week Direct Commission Officer Basic Course (DCOBC) and then report to their assigned unit.

==== Training ====
The Direct Commission Officer Basic Course is a course designed to provide newly commissioned officers with the basic skills and knowledge necessary to perform their duties as an Army officer. The course covers topics such as military leadership, customs and courtesies, military law, and Army values.

==== Benefits ====
As an officer in the U.S. Army, DCP participants receive a competitive salary and benefits package, including healthcare, retirement benefits, and educational opportunities. They also have the opportunity to serve their country and make a difference in their communities.

== U.S. Navy Direct Commission Officers ==
The United States Navy has an extensive DCO program serving as the commissioning source for both active component staff corps officers as well as Navy Reserve officers. As of October 2019, the Navy consolidated its two-week reserve training program (Direct Commission Officer Indoctrination Course, DCOIC) with its five-week Active Duty training program (Officer Development School, ODS), also at Newport, Rhode Island. Officer Candidate School (OCS), the 12-week program that college graduates wishing to join the U.S. Navy as active duty line officers must complete, is also located at Newport.

Base Realignment and Closure (BRAC) of 2005 decreed that the Navy Reserve officer DCO School be relocated from Naval Aviation Schools Command at Naval Air Station Pensacola, Florida to Naval Education and Training Center Newport, Rhode Island effective January 2007. As a result of BRAC and other budgetary-driven actions, the U.S. Navy consolidated many of its schools at NETC, Naval Station Newport, Rhode Island.

The Navy is currently considering merging DCO School, Limited Duty Officer School, and Mustang University into one contiguous officer training program—all located in Newport, Rhode Island. As of January 2007 all Navy Reserve LDO and CWO Officers attend the same two-week course of instruction in Newport. DCO officers attend a rigorous five-week course.

The U.S. Navy Reserve Direct Commissioning Program allows university-educated professionals, between ages 19 to 42 (or older, in some cases), the opportunity to be appointed as officers in the Navy Reserve. Selection is highly competitive, with most DCOs holding advanced degrees (MAs, MBAs, MSs, JDs, MDs, DOs, PharmDs and Ph.Ds.) and/or significant civilian work experience. In recent years, the number of direct commissions offered by the Navy Reserve has increased due to the need for skilled officers to serve as Individual Augmentees (IAs) in Iraq and Afghanistan. The Direct Commissioning Program serves the expanded needs of the Navy in certain officer skill areas listed below in alphabetical order by category:

Unrestricted Line Officer

- Special Warfare Officer

Restricted Line Officer (including Special Duty Officer)

- Aerospace Engineering Duty Officer (AEDO)
  - NOTE: Unlike AEDOs in the Regular Navy, who must first be qualified Naval Aviators or Naval Flight Officers with at least five years operational flying experience in naval aircraft, direct commission AEDOs in the Navy Reserve are not required to have any military flight experience
- Aerospace Maintenance Duty Officer (AMDO)
- Engineering Duty Officer
- Human Resources Officer
- Merchant Marine Officer
- Public Affairs Officer

Information Warfare Line Officer (formerly information warfare corps; information dominance)

- Communications Systems Warfare Officer (formerly Information Professional)
- Cryptologic Warfare Officer
- Cyber Warfare Engineer
- Intelligence Officer
- Maritime Cyber Warfare Officer
- Maritime Space Officer
- Meteorology/Oceanography Officer (METOC)

Staff Corps Officer

- Chaplain Corps Officer
- Medical Programs (Medical, Dental, Nurse, Pharmacist and Medical Service Corps)
- Supply Corps Officer (Logistics, Transportation, Supply Management, Customs, Contracting)
- JAG Corps Officer
- Civil Engineer Corps Officer

Limited Duty Officer (Various specialties)

Warrant Officer (Various specialties)

Some skill areas may not have openings each year. Each year, skill area recruiting quotas are promulgated for recruiters to fill. Upon completion of their training regimen, DCOs serve on nearly every type of ship in the fleet and at shore establishments around the globe. Navy DCOs are forward deployed and have frequently served on the ground in Iraq and Afghanistan as an integral part of the Navy's role in the war on terror.

== U.S. Coast Guard Direct Commission Officers ==
The United States Coast Guard uses the DCO program to bring specialized skills and backgrounds into the Coast Guard commissioned officer corps. The DCO course is conducted by the Officer Candidate School, located at the United States Coast Guard Academy in New London, Connecticut. Depending on program and background, the course is three, four, or five weeks long.

There are seven Direct Commission Officer programs:

- Aviation
  - NOTE: Individuals in this category are typically rated/designated military aviators who have previously served on active duty as officers in other branches of the U.S. armed forces. They have transferred to and are being recommissioned as officers in the U.S. Coast Guard in order to serve as Coast Guard Aviators.
- Engineering (Various disciplines)
- Environmental Management
- Intelligence
- Legal
- Prior-Trained Military Officer
- Maritime Academy Graduate From the U.S. Merchant Marine Academy or a State Merchant Marine Academy

Some DCO programs may not have openings each year. While DCOs are expected to fill specific specialty areas, they are not specifically precluded from crossing into other operational or support billets in follow-on assignments.

== U.S. Public Health Service Commissioned Corps Direct Commission Officers ==
The U.S. Public Health Service Commissioned Corps Direct Commissioning Program allows university-educated professionals, between ages 19 to 44 (or older, in some cases), the opportunity to be appointed as an officer in the Public Health Service Commissioned Corps. All candidates must complete a two-week Officer Basic Course (OBC) before entering active duty. Most PHSCC DCOs hold advanced degrees (DDSs, DMDs, MSs, MDs, DOs, PharmDs and Ph.Ds.) and significant civilian work experience, and the minimum in many programs is a master's degree from a duly accredited program. One of the fields requiring only a baccalaureate degree is engineering. The Direct Commissioning Program serves the expanded needs of the PHS in certain officer skill areas listed below:

- Physician
- Dentist
- Nurse
- Pharmacist
- Dietitian
- Engineer
- Environmental health officer
- Health services officer
- Scientist/researcher
- Therapist (includes occupational therapy, physical therapy, registered respiratory therapist, speech-language pathology, and audiology)
- Veterinarian
- Medical Technologist

== National Oceanic and Atmospheric Administration Commissioned Officer Corps Direct Commission Officers ==
The NOAA Corps Direct Commissioning Program allows university-educated professionals, between ages 19 to 35 (or older, in some cases), the opportunity to be appointed as an officer in the National Oceanic and Atmospheric Administration Commissioned Officer Corps. All must complete a 19-week basic officer training class (BOTC), at the United States Coast Guard Officer Candidate School at the United States Coast Guard Academy before entering active duty. Many NOAA Corps DCOs hold advanced degrees (MS, MAs and Ph.Ds.) and significant civilian work experience, though the minimum requirement is a baccalaureate degree. The Direct Commissioning Program serves the expanded needs of the NOAA Corps in certain officer skill areas listed below:

- Engineering
- Mathematics
- Any science related to NOAA's mission
