= List of United States Naval officer designators =

This is a list of naval officer designators in the United States Navy. In the United States Navy, all active and reserve component officers are assigned to one of four officer communities, based on their education, training, and assignments: Line Officers (divided into Unrestricted Line or URL, Restricted Line or RL, and Restricted Line Special Duty or RL SD), Staff Corps Officers, Limited Duty Officers (LDO), or Warrant Officers (WO/CWO). Each community is further subdivided by primary occupation. Each occupation is identified by a designator.

== Definition ==
The officer billet designator codes are four-digit numbers used to identify the primary naval specialty qualifications required of the billet incumbent and to administratively categorize officer billets for proper management and identification. They serve as a manpower management tool when used in conjunction with the officer designator codes. These codes are entered in the Manpower Authorizations (OPNAV Form 1000/2) to indicate the categories of officers required for the billets.

The first digit identifies the officer's community.

First Digit	Community	
1	Line (unrestricted and restricted)	
2	Staff	Medical & JAG
3	Staff	Supply Corps
4	Staff	Chaplain Corps
5	Staff	Civil Engineer Corps
6	Limited duty	
7	Warrant	

The second and third digits denote the officer's area of specialization within the line, staff corps, LDO, or warrant officer community.

The final (fourth) digit denotes the officer's current type of commission.

Fourth Digit	Commission
0	An officer of the Regular Navy whose permanent grade is ensign or above.
1	An officer of the Regular Navy whose permanent status is warrant officer or chief warrant officer (note that warrant officer [pay grade W-1] is not currently used in the U.S. Navy; all U.S. Navy warrant officers are commissioned as chief warrant officer-2 [pay grade W-2]; only designator 7840, cyber warrant officer of the line, is coded in manpower and personnel records for warrant officer-1 [pay grade W-1], as "Code P" per section 3, part A, of NAVPERS 15839I, of July 2018).
2	A temporary officer of the Regular Navy whose permanent status is enlisted.
3	An officer of the Regular Navy who is on the retired list, i.e., is on the permanent or temporary list of retired officers of the Regular Navy.
4	No longer used.
5	An officer of the Navy Reserve, in either the Ready Reserve or the Standby Reserve category (NOTE: this code excludes designators with a 4th digit of 7, 8, or 9, i.e., those reserve officers who are not currently serving on the Training and Administration of the Reserve (TAR) Program, or appointed from the Naval Reserve Integration Program, or a member of the Retired Reserve, see immediately below).
7	An officer of the Navy Reserve on active duty in the Training and Administration of the Reserve (TAR) Program (previously known as the Full Time Support [FTS] program); includes officers of the TAR program rotated to other than TAR billets.
8	An officer of the Navy Reserve who was appointed in the Naval Reserve Integration Program from enlisted status or whose permanent status is chief warrant officer, warrant officer, or enlisted.
9	An officer of the Navy Reserve who is on the retired list, i.e., the Retired Reserve category of the Navy Reserve.

Between fiscal year 1992 and fiscal year 2005, all officers entering the U.S. Navy were awarded a Reserve commission (commissioned as Ensign, USNR). Legislation was signed that all Reserve officers on full-time active duty, previously designated by a "5" in the last digit of the designator, would be converted to a Regular Navy commission by the close of fiscal year 2006.

Per the National Defense Authorization Act of 2005, all officers commissioned via the U.S. Naval Academy or via Naval ROTC programs on scholarship, were once again awarded Regular commissions as Ensign, USN or 2nd Lieutenant, USMC upon graduation as appropriate and retroactively to serving officers of those programs not previously augmented to the Regular Navy or Regular Marine Corps. Non-scholarship (i.e., "contract) graduates of Naval ROTC as well as those of the Navy's Officer Candidate School continued to be awarded Reserve commissions entering active duty, eligible for augmentation at a later date.

There is no distinction between USN and USNR officers, no matter what the commissioning source. All hold the same ranks, have the same responsibilities and authority, and enjoy the same privileges. As part of the U.S. Navy's Active–Reserve Integration (ARI) initiative that "operationalized" the Navy's Reserve component, the term "U.S. Naval Reserve" was superseded by "U.S. Navy Reserve", and the term USNR was discontinued as a matter of Total Force policy in 2005. All officers in the U.S. Navy now use the term USN with their rank titles.

As used above, Training and Administration of the Reserve (TAR) program officers are reserve officers serving on either fixed or indefinite periods of active duty, while remaining reserve officers, under the authority of 10 USC 12310. The Training and Administration of the Reserve program exists to provide TAR for training, administration, recruiting, organization, and equipping the reserve components.

== (1xxx) Line Officers ==
=== Fully Warfare Qualified Unrestricted Line (URL) Officers ===
Unrestricted Line Officers (URL Officers) are commissioned Officers of the Line in the United States Navy, both Regular Navy and Navy Reserve, who are not restricted in the performance of duty, and are qualified to Command at Sea the Navy's warfighting combatant units such as warships, submarines, aviation squadrons, and SEAL Teams. They are also qualified to command the higher echelons of those units, known as "major commands," such as destroyer and submarine squadrons, aviation wings and groups, and special warfare groups. At the Flag Officer level, they also command carrier strike groups, expeditionary strike groups, task forces, and Fleet and Force commands. URL officers are also eligible to command shore installations, facilities and activities directly supporting the Navy's warfare mission.

111X	URL Officer qualified as a Surface Warfare Officer.
112X	URL Officer qualified as a Submarine Warfare Officer.
113X	URL Officer qualified as a Special Warfare Officer (SEAL).
114X	URL Officer qualified as an Explosive Ordnance Disposal (EOD) Warfare Officer.
131X	URL Officer qualified for duty involving piloting heavier-than-air, or heavier and lighter-than air types of aircraft as a Naval Aviator. Includes Naval Aviator-Astronaut.
132X	URL Officer qualified for duty involving flying heavier-than-air, or heavier and lighter-than-air type aircraft as a Naval Flight Officer. Includes Naval Flight Officer-Astronaut.

=== Non-Warfare Qualified Unrestricted Line (URL) Officers ===
110X General URL Officer without warfare qualifications (NOTE: Those Fleet Support Officers (FSO) without warfare qualifications were merged into URL officer designator 110X after 2010, after RL SD designator 170X was phased out, per the 2010 NAVPERS 15839I, Manual of Navy Officer Manpower and Personnel Classifications, Vol. 1, Part A).

130X URL Officer previously qualified Naval Aviator or Naval Flight Officer whose operational flight rating has been terminated for aviation medical or flight performance reasons, or by the individual's personal resignation.

=== Training Designators For Unrestricted Line Officers ===
116X	URL Officer in training for Surface Warfare Officer qualification.
117X	URL Officer in training for Submarine Warfare Officer qualification.
118X	URL Officer in training for Special Warfare qualification.
119X	URL Officer in training for EOD/Diver qualification.
137X	URL Officer in training for duty involving flying as a Student Naval Flight Officer.
139X	URL Officer in training for duty involving flying as a Student Naval Aviator (pilot).

=== Restricted Line (RL) Officer designators ===
Officers of the line of the Regular Navy and Navy Reserve who are restricted in the performance of duty by having been designated for aviation duty, engineering duty, aerospace engineering duty, or special duty. RL officers are authorized to command ashore within their particular speciality, but are not eligible for combatant command at sea, which remains strictly within the purview of URL officers.

121X	RL Officer - Nuclear Propulsion Training Officer (Nuclear Power School Instructor).
122X	RL Officer - Nuclear Engineering Officer (Naval Reactors Engineer).
1230	RL Officer - Permanent Military Professor (Pay grades O-5 through O-6 only).
144X	RL Officer - Engineering Duty Officer who is qualified as a Ship Engineering specialist.
150X	RL Officer - Aerospace Engineering Duty Officer, Engineering or Maintenance (NOTE: Designators 151X and 152X merge into 150X at pay grade O-6).
151X	RL Officer - Aerospace Engineering Duty Officer, Engineering (AEDO).
152X	RL Officer - Aerospace Engineering Duty Officer, Maintenance (AMDO and AMO).
154X	RL Officer - Aviation Duty Officer (ADO Naval Aviator).

=== Restricted Line Special Duty (RL SD) Officers ===
120X	RL SD Officer - (Special Duty) Human Resources Officer.
128X	RL SD Officer - (Special Duty) Permanent Professional Recruiter Officer (LT and LCDR only)
165X	RL SD Officer - (Special Duty Officer) Public Affairs Officer.
166X	RL SD Officer - (Special Duty Officer) Strategic Sealift Officer (SSO) (NOTE: Formerly designators 162X, 166X, 167X, and 169X (Merchant Marine)).
168X	RL SD Officer - (Special Duty Officer) Reserve Recruiting.
170X	RL SD Officer - (Special Duty Officer) Fleet Support Officer (NOTE: Designator phased out by 2010, per NAVPERS 15839I, Manual of Navy Officer Manpower and Personnel Classifications, Vol. 1, Part A, and those FSO's without warfare qualifications were merged into URL officer designator 110X).
171X	RL SD Officer - (Special Duty Officer) Foreign Area Officer (FAO).
180X	RL SD Officer - (Special Duty Officer) Meteorology/Oceanography Officer.
181X	RL SD Officer - (Special Duty Officer) Cryptologic Warfare Officer (NOTE: Former designators 161X and 164X merged and redesignated effective Oct 2010 under Information Warfare Community).
182X	RL SD Officer - (Special Duty Officer) Information Professional Officer (NOTE: Formerly designator 160X; redesignated effective October 2010 under Information Warfare Community).
183X	RL SD Officer - (Special Duty Officer) Intelligence Officer (NOTE: Formerly designator 163X, redesignated effective October 2010 under Information Warfare Community).
184X	RL SD Officer - (Special Duty Officer) Cyber Warfare Engineer.
186X	RL SD Officer - (Special Duty Officer) Information Warfare Community (IWC) Flag Officer (NOTE: RDML/O-7 and above)
187x	RL SD Officer - (Special Duty Officer) Maritime Space Officer
188x	RL SD Officer - (Special Duty Officer) Maritime Cyber Warfare Officer

=== Training designators For Restricted Line (RL) and Restricted Line Special Duty (RL SD) Officers ===
146X	RL Officer - in training for Engineering Duty Officer (EDO) (NOTE: Designator converts to 144X upon completion of qualification requirements).

== ([2-5]x0x) Staff Corps Designators ==
Officers, Regular and Reserve, of all staff corps of the Navy. The eight staff corps (and one Flag Officer) designators are:

210X	Medical Corps Officer; includes Naval Flight Surgeon, Naval Surface Medical Officer and Naval Submarine Medical Officer
220X	Dental Corps Officer
230X	Medical Service Corps Officer; includes Naval Aviation Physiologist and Naval Aviation Experimental Psychologist
250X	Judge Advocate General's Corps Officer
270X	Senior Health Care Executive Officer (NOTE: Flag Officers, O-7 through O-9, accessed from Active duty Medical Corps, Dental Corps, Medical Service Corps, and Nurse Corps officers in designators 210X, 220X, 230X and 290X)
290X	Nurse Corps Officer; includes Navy Flight Nurse
310X	Supply Corps Officer
410X	Chaplain Corps Officer
510X	Civil Engineer Corps (i.e., Seabee) Officer

== (6xxx) Limited Duty Officers ==
Officers of the line, or staff, as appropriate by their career field, of the Regular Navy and Navy Reserve appointed for the performance of duty in the broad occupational fields indicated by their former warrant designators or enlisted rating groups.

=== Limited Duty Line Officers (by Community) ===
611X Deck (Surface).
612X Operations (Surface).
613X Engineering/Repair (Surface).
615X Special Warfare (NOTE: Phased out as of July 2018, per NAVPERS 15839I, Manual of Navy Officer Manpower and Personnel Classifications, Vol. 1, Part A).
616X Ordnance (Surface).
618X Electronics (Surface).
620X Nuclear Power (General) (NOTE: Formerly designator 640X).
621X Deck (Submarine).
623X Engineering/Repair (Submarine).
626X Ordnance (Submarine).
628X Electronics (Submarine).
629X Communications (Submarine).
630X Aviator (Aviation) (NOTE: Phased out as of July 2018, per NAVPERS 15839I, Manual of Navy Officer Manpower and Personnel Classifications, Vol. 1, Part A).
631X Deck (Aviation).
632X Operations (Aviation).
633X Maintenance (Aviation).
636X Ordnance (Aviation).
639X Air Traffic Control (Aviation).
641X Administration (General).
643X Bandmaster (General).
647X Photography (General).
648X Explosive Ordnance Disposal (General).
649X Security (General).

=== Limited Duty Staff Corps Officers (by Community) ===
651X Supply Corps.
653X Civil Engineer Corps.
655X Law (Judge Advocate General's Corps).

=== Limited Duty Line Officers (Information Warfare Community) ===
NOTE: 68XX designators to be assigned to Lieutenant/O-3E and below requirements only. LCDR/O-4 and above billets are assigned the appropriate 18XX designator.

680X Meteorology/Oceanography (NOTE: Formerly designator 646X).
681X Cryptologic Warfare (NOTE: Formerly designator 644X).
682X Information Professional (NOTE: Formerly designator 642X).
683X Intelligence (NOTE: Formerly designator 645X).

== (7xxx) Warrant Officers ==
Officers of the line, or staff, as appropriate by their career field, of the Regular Navy and Navy Reserve appointed to chief warrant officer for the performance of duty in the technical fields indicated by former enlisted rating groups.

=== Line Chief Warrant Officers (by Community) ===
711X Boatswain (Surface)
712X Operations Technician (Surface)
713X Engineering Technician (Surface)
715X Special Warfare Technician (Expeditionary Warfare)
716X Ordnance Technician (Surface)
717X Special Warfare Combatant Craft Technician (Expeditionary Warfare)
718X Electronics Technician (Surface)
720X Diving Officer (General)
721X Boatswain (Submarine)
723X Engineering Technician (Submarine)
724X Repair Technician (Submarine)
726X Ordnance Technician (Submarine)
728X Acoustics Technician (Submarine)
731X Boatswain (Aviation)
732X Operations Technician (Aviation)
733X Maintenance Technician (Aviation) (NOTE: Formerly designator 734X or 738X).
736X Ordnance Technician (Aviation)
740X Nuclear Power Technician (General) (NOTE: The 740X designator was approved for deletion on 9 May 2013. The FY14 LDO-CWO in service procurement board will be the final board which accesses nuclear CWOs. Nuclear CWOs may continue their service by converting to nuclear LDO (640X) or continue their service as warrant officers and compete for promotions through CWO5. All billets will be recoded to 640X and 740X will not be deleted until the inventory naturally attrites. NAVADMIN 124/13 refers.)
741X Ship's Clerk (General)
748X Explosive Ordnance Disposal Technician (General) (NOTE: The 748X designator was approved for deletion on 26 Oct 2011. No new accessions to the 748X designator will be taken. All personnel and billets will be appropriately recoded in phases that began on 1 Nov 2011. NAVADMIN 319/11 refers).
749X Security Technician (General)

=== Staff Corps Chief Warrant Officers (by Community) ===
751X Supply Corps (NOTE: Authorized for active duty billets/personnel only).
752X Food Service (Supply Corps)
753X Civil Engineering (Civil Engineer Corps)
756X Technical Nurse (Nurse Corps)

=== Line Chief Warrant Officers (Information Warfare Community) ===
780X Oceanography
781X Cryptologic Warfare Technician (NOTE: Formerly designator 744X).
782X Information Systems Technician (NOTE: Formerly designator 742X).
783X Intelligence Technician (NOTE: Formerly designator 745X).
784X Cyber (NOTE: Formerly designator 743X).

== See also ==
- United States Navy officer rank insignia
- List of United States Navy staff corps
- Uniforms of the United States Navy
- Badges of the United States Navy
- U.S. Navy Midshipman rank insignia can be found in the Midshipman article.
- U.S. Navy Warrant officer rank insignia can be found in the Warrant Officer (United States) article.
- List of United States Navy enlisted warfare designations
- United States Navy enlisted rate insignia
- List of United States Navy ratings
- Navy Enlisted Classification
