= Engineering duty officer =

Restricted line officer in the US Navy

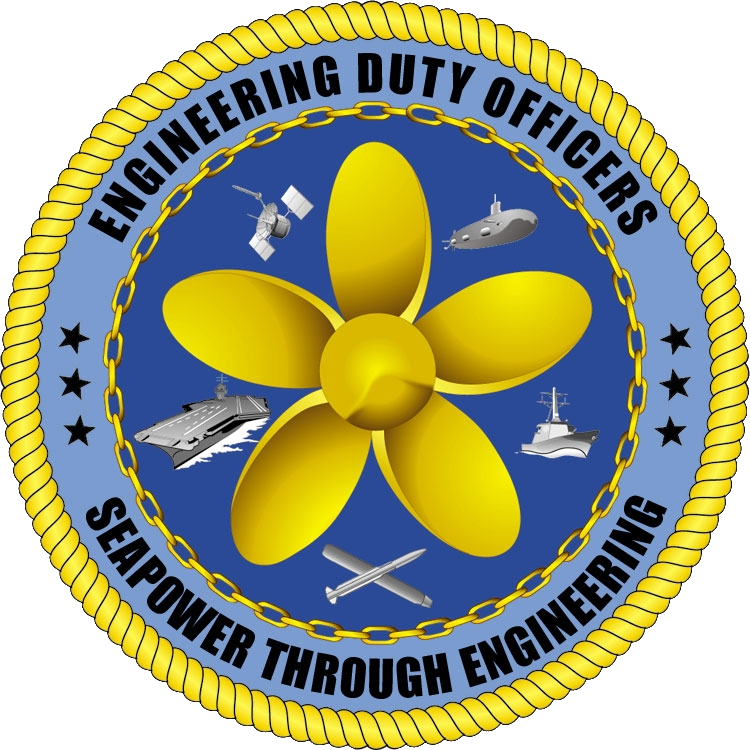
Official logotype of the engineering duty officer community

An engineering duty officer (EDO) is a restricted line officer in the United States Navy, involved with the design, acquisition, construction, repair, maintenance, conversion, overhaul and disposal of ships, submarines, aircraft carriers, and the systems installed aboard (weapons, command and control, communications, computers). As of August 1, 2016, there are approximately 835 engineering duty officers on active duty in the U.S. Navy, representing approximately two percent of its active-duty commissioned officers (and approximately 400 engineering duty officers in the Navy Reserve).

== Mission ==
The engineering duty officer community provides experienced naval engineers to provide technical advice and leadership. EDOs are involved with the design, acquisition, construction, repair, maintenance, conversion, overhaul, and disposal of ships, submarines, and the systems installed aboard. EDOs are unique to the Navy because they start their careers as Unrestricted Line Officers. First, prospective EDOs learn how to operate ships or submarines. Next, all EDOs obtain technical/engineering master's degrees. Then, as engineering duty officers, they assume technical leadership roles.

== Insignia ==
As line officers of the Navy, EDOs wear an inverted gold star above their rank stripes on both their dress blue uniforms and on their shoulder boards. In virtually all respects, their uniforms are indistinguishable from their Unrestricted Line (URL) counterparts. The two predominant sources of new EDOs are by lateral transfer from another URL designator or by choosing to exercise their Engineering Duty Option granted upon commissioning. For active duty URL officers, a requirement for lateral transfer or for exercising an Engineering Duty Option is the completion of either Submarine Warfare or Surface Warfare qualification. Therefore, the vast majority of EDOs wear the same Submarine Warfare or Surface Warfare insignia as their URL counterparts.

A small number of EDOs not previously qualified as submarine warfare officers can volunteer for the Engineering Duty Dolphin Program, and by successfully completing it, earn their Submarine Engineering Duty insignia.

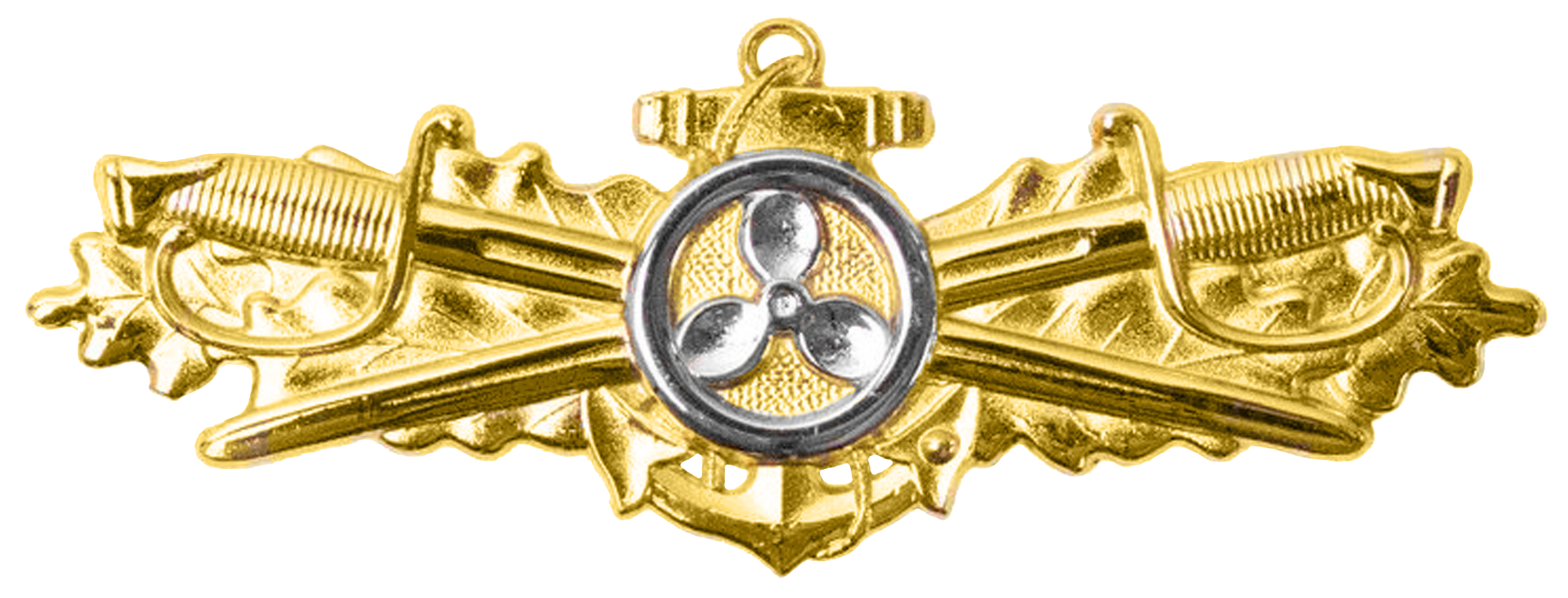
Engineering Duty Officer Qualification Insignia

The EDO qualification insignia was approved in June 2017. Taking the same form as other warfare or qualification devices, it is a metal or embroidered chest device worn on the left side primary or secondary position of the uniform. Once qualified, EDOs can wear this insignia according to U.S. Navy uniform regulations (December 22, 2017). Warfare-qualified EDOs have the option of wearing the EDO insignia in the secondary position since warfare devices take precedence over the EDO qualification insignia.

== Areas of specialization ==
Current EDOs serve in one of several career fields, including:

- Program management of surface ships, submarines, weapons and combat systems, and Information Warfare (C4ISR) systems.
- Maintenance of surface ships and submarines at naval shipyards and smaller-scale maintenance facilities.
- Naval Sea Systems and Naval Information Warfare Systems engineering.
- Underwater ship husbandry, diving, and salvage.
- The Naval Nuclear Propulsion Program.

== History ==
The importance of engineering duty officers in United States Navy history is memorialized in a bronze bas-relief by American sculptor Antonio Tobias "Toby" Mendez , on the sculpture wall at the United States Navy Memorial in Washington DC, entitled "Engineering Duty Officers – 'Sharpening the Point of the Spear.' " This is one of 26 such reliefs along the southern hemisphere of the Granite Sea at the Navy Memorial, which commemorate events, personnel, and communities of the various sea services.

The breast insignia of the EDO, first issued in January 2018, was spearheaded by Capt. Huan Nguyen, with the support of Rear Adm. Alma Grocki and Rear Adm. Ronald Fritzemeier.

== Notable engineering duty officers ==
- The former Honorable Sean J. Stackley, Assistant Secretary of the Navy (Research, Development and_Acquisition).
- Admiral Hyman G. Rickover, USN, "Father of the Nuclear Navy."
- Admiral Samuel M. Robinson, USN, Director of Material and Procurement during World War II and first Chief of the Bureau of Ships.
- Vice Admiral George P. Nanos, USN, former Commander of the Naval Sea Systems Command and Director of Los Alamos National Laboratory.
- Commodore George R. Salisbury, USN, 15th Naval Governor of Guam.
- Rear Admiral Wayne E. Meyer, USN, "Father of Aegis".
- Rear Admiral William S. "Deak" Parsons, USN, Assistant Chief of the Bureau of Ordnance, known for assembling (in flight) the triggering mechanism of the atomic bomb "Little Boy" aboard the Enola Gay.
- Rear Admiral Benjamin F. Isherwood, USN, Civil War–era engineer-in-chief of the Navy and founder of the Bureau of Steam Engineering.
- Rear Admiral George W. Melville, USN, pioneering advocate of warship steam propulsion and engineer-in-chief of the Navy.
- Rear Admiral David W. Taylor, USN, chief constructor of the Navy during World War I, and builder of the United States' first experimental warship towing tank.
- Rear Admiral Henry A. Schade, USN, designer of the Midway-class aircraft carrier, and later a director of the Naval Research Laboratory.
- Rear Admiral Kathleen K. Paige, USN, first Ballistic Missile Defense System technical director at the United States Missile Defense Agency.
- Captain Willard F. "Bill" Searle Jr., USN, former Navy Supervisor of Salvage, and coordinator of the USS Scorpion (SSN-589) search effort, and the search for a lost nuclear warhead (B28 nuclear bomb) near Palomares, Spain in 1966.
- Captain Heidemarie M. Stefanyshyn-Piper, USN, Space Shuttle astronaut mission specialist and Navy diver.
- Lieutenant Commander Joseph Weber, USN, co-discoverer of the principles behind the maser and laser; developer of the first gravitational wave detectors (after leaving naval service).
- Captain William J. Kastner, USN (ret.), 33 years of service as Naval Engineering Duty Officer and instrumental in developing the modern reserve EDO program.
- Rear Admiral Grace Hopper, USN, a pioneer of computer programming, Hopper was the first to devise the theory of machine-independent programming languages

== See also ==
- List of Naval Officer Designators
