= United States Navy rank insignia =

United States Navy rank insignia may refer to:

- U.S. Navy enlisted rate insignia
- U.S. Navy officer rank insignia
