= Foreign area officer =

US Military officer: regionally focused expert in political-military operations

A foreign area officer (FAO) is a commissioned officer from any of the six branches of the United States Armed Forces who is a regionally focused expert in political-military operations. Such officers possess a unique combination of strategic focus and regional expertise, with political, cultural, sociological, economic, and geographic awareness. Foreign language proficiency is necessary in at least one of the dominant languages in their specified region.

A FAO will typically serve overseas tours as a defense attaché, a security assistance officer, or as a political-military planner in a service's headquarters, Joint Staff, Major Commands, Unified Combatant Commands, or in agencies of the Department of Defense. They also serve as arms control specialists, country desk officers, liaison officers, and Military Personnel Exchange Program (MPEP) officer to host nation or coalition allies. Increased numbers of FAOs were serving as political and cultural advisors to combatant staffs in support of the Iraq War and War in Afghanistan. Presently, there are just over 2,200 FAOs in active operational capacities, while roughly 25 percent are still in training. The services plan to recruit and train more than 170 a year, with almost 1,100 new FAOs entering the program between 2005 and 2014.

Roles and responsibilities of FAOs are extensive and varied. They advise senior leaders on political-military operations and relations with other nations, provide cultural expertise to forward-deployed commands conducting military operations, build and maintain long-term relationships with foreign leaders, develop and coordinate security cooperation, execute security assistance programs with host nations, and develop reports on diplomatic, information, military, and economic activities.

== Army ==
The Army Foreign Area Officer Program (Functional Area 48 or FA48) is a single-track FAO program managed by G-35, DAMO-SSF, which is the Strategic Leadership Division. It is the largest and oldest FAO program of the Services. The Proponent Office is responsible for establishing policy guidance and FAO career field development as well as establishing specific programs focused on the accession, training, education, distribution, utilization, deployment, and separation of FAOs. Currently, there are ~1,200 Army FAOs either in training or fully qualified.

Army FAOs are categorized by areas of concentration that correspond with their respective Branch, further grouped in scope by functional areas. Army FAOs are divided into multiple categories of regional areas of expertise and language skills. In 2022, the functional area specialties were consolidated from 8 categories down to 5 different categories, including the merging of multiple Asian-concentrated areas down to just one, as well as various other changes:

- 48B – Western Hemisphere
- 48E – Europe/Eurasia (including the -stan countries minus Pakistan)
- 48G – Middle East and North Africa (including Afghanistan and Iran)
- 48J – Sub-Saharan Africa
- 48P – Asia-Pacific (including Southern Asian and Pacific Island countries and territories)

The Army Reserve has a small corps of FAOs who mostly serve in operational and back-up roles at the Defense Attaché Service as Reserve A/ARMAs, and at the Geographical Combatant Commands as Pol-Mil Officers and Country Desk Officers. Selection for the Reserve Component (RC) FAO Program is highly selective, with new accessions only chosen to fill identified vacancies at semi-annual selection panels held by Army Human Resources Command with the RC FAO Proponent.

== Marine Corps ==
The International Affairs Officer Program replaced the FAO and International Relations Officer Program in the Marine Corps in 2000, which is an umbrella program that governs two separate, but interrelated military occupational specialty: the Foreign Area Officer (994x) and the Regional Affairs Officer (982x) designations. Much like the USAF dual-track system, RAOs are basically FAOs without local language skills. There are approximately 280 FAOs and 80 RAOs in the Marine Corps, distributed amongst the following specialties:

- 9821 – RAO Latin America
- 9822 – RAO former Soviet Union
- 9823 - RAO China
- 9824 – RAO Middle East/North Africa
- 9825 – RAO Sub-Saharan Africa
- 9826 – RAO Southwest Asia
- 9827 – Western Europe
- 9828 – Eastern Asia (excluding China)
- 9829 – RAO Eastern Europe (excluding former Soviet Union)
- 9940 – Basic FAO
- 9941 – FAO Latin America
- 9942 – FAO Former Soviet Union
- 9943 – FAO China
- 9944 – FAO Middle East/North Africa
- 9945 – FAO Sub-Saharan Africa
- 9946 – FAO Southwest Asia
- 9947 – FAO Western Europe
- 9948 – FAO East Asia (excluding China)
- 9949 – FAO Eastern Europe (excluding former Soviet Union)

== Navy ==
The Navy FAO Branch is a restricted line community of the Navy. The Navy has approximately 350 FAOs either fully qualified or in training. The community is expected to achieve 400 officers by 2019. As with the Army, the Navy has a single-track system, where officers from other Navy communities transfer over to Foreign Area Officer permanently. Navy FAOs are assigned the 1710 designator.

Navy FAOs are apportioned amongst the five regional Unified Combatant Commands:

- United States European Command
- United States Central Command
- United States Africa Command
- United States Pacific Command
- United States Southern Command
- United States Space Command

== Air Force ==
The International Affairs Specialist Program is the Air Force component, and encompasses two officer types: the Foreign Area Officer (previously Regional Affairs Strategist) and Political-Military Affairs Strategist. Both tracks remain under the Air Force Specialty Code 16: 16F for FAO and 16P for PAS. PAS development begins in conjunction with Intermediate Developmental Education, at around 10–12 years of commissioned service, and officers serve in similar positions as FAO officers do, but perform duties that require a broad knowledge of political-military affairs rather than regional expertise with foreign language skills. FAO officers require language skills and follow a more intensive, regionally focused pipeline with the following subcategories:

- A – Attaché
- C – SOUTHCOM (United States Southern Command)
- D – PACOM (United States Indo-Pacific Command)
- F – CENTCOM (United States Central Command)
- G – AFRICOM (United States Africa Command)
- H – EUCOM (United States European Command)
- L – Generalist

FAOs start their training earlier due to their more intensive training pipeline, typically between 7–10 years of commissioned service, and will serve in alternating FAO and primary career field positions for the remainder of their career. PAS officers will only serve one tour as a PAS before moving back to their primary AFSC. FAOs are required to maintain their language skills at or above a minimum level (ILR scale reading 2/listening 2/speaking 1+) for the remainder of their career.

== Accession and training ==
Acceptance into the FAO programs typically requires at least 7–10 years of commissioned service, since most FAO positions are designated for that of a field-grade officer (Marines being the exception, who only require 3 years). Generally speaking, applicants must have at a minimum the following:

- US citizenship with an undergraduate degree with a GPA of 2.7 (33rd percentile) or higher on a scale of 4.0 (required to become a commissioned U.S. military officer)
- Eligibility for Top Secret/Sensitive Compartmented Information (TS/SCI) security clearance
- Primary MOS or warfare area qualification, with broad military experience
- A score of 95 or better on the Defense Language Aptitude Battery or a Defense Language Proficiency Tests score of 2/2.
- Pay-grade of O-3 (Captain in Army, Marine Corps and Air Force; Lieutenant in Navy and Coast Guard) or above.

FAO training varies (depending candidate's skills at selection), but usually takes a minimum of 3–5 years before FAOs are qualified for operations:

- 1 year at the Naval Postgraduate School in Monterey, California where a graduate degree is completed in national security affairs with an emphasis on the target region. Army FAOs can attend civilian graduate schools of their choosing.
- Foreign Area Officer Orientation Course, a 5-day introductory course into their career path
- 6 – 18 months of basic language training, depending upon the language(s) selected and the level of difficulty, at either Defense Language Institute Foreign Language Center in Monterey, CA or Washington, D.C.
- 6 – 12 months of in-country training for familiarization, language enrichment, and professional development in the assigned region

Standard requirements for full-qualification as a FAO generally include the following:

- TS/SCI clearance and a minimum Defense Language Proficiency Test scores of 2 in listening, 2 in reading, and 1+ in speaking
- Demonstrated spoken and written fluency in both American English and the assigned foreign language
- Political science/diplomacy Master's Degree with an international focus
- Regional expertise at a level 3 or above, per Chairman of the Joint Chiefs Instruction 3126.01
- Joint Professional Military Education Phase 1 completed (if applicable, typically for Navy and Marines).

Unlike its Active Component (AC) counterpart the Army RC FAO Program only selects branch-qualified officers who already possess 2/2 or better language qualifications with matching regional experience, Master's degrees, and at least Phase 2 their common core of Intermediate Level Education completed. As such, these officers tend to have had substantial international experience in their civilian careers that augments the military backgrounds of their AC FAO colleagues.

The Under Secretary of Defense for Personnel and Readiness is the proponent for FAO programs for the DoD. He or she establishes DoD accession, education, and utilization policy for Foreign Area Officers. FAO guidance, directives, and standards for all military branch FAO programs are promulgated by DoD Directive 1315.17. The Under Secretary of Defense for Policy and the Under Secretary of Defense for Intelligence oversees FAO capabilities, needs, and utilization in the DoD Agencies that they respectively supervise. For combat support activities, such oversight is conducted in conjunction with the Chairman of the Joint Chiefs of Staff.

The Defense Language Office ensures a strategic focus on meeting present and future requirements for language and regional expertise, among military and civilian employees. This office's main responsibilities are to oversee and manage the implementation of a comprehensive Department-wide Language Transformation Roadmap; identify policy, procedural, and resource needs associated with providing needed language capability; oversee policy regarding the development, management, and utilization of civilian employees and members of the Armed Forces; and conduct research and analyze studies, reports, and lessons learned from the Global War on Terrorism and current military operations as they pertain to language and regional area expertise.

== Leadership ==
While promotion levels vary between the branches, retention rates of FAOs are higher than service averages. The bulk of the FAO community is primarily composed of field grade officers, though general and flag officers include General John Abizaid, General Christopher G. Cavoli, Lieutenant General Karl Eikenberry, Lieutenant General Keith Dayton, Lieutenant General Charles Hooper, Major General Robin Fontes, Brigadier General Richard M. Lake, Brigadier General Henry Nowak, Brigadier General Mark O’Neill, Brigadier General Kevin Ryan, Brigadier General John Adams, and Rear Admiral Douglas Venlet.

== See also ==
- Defense Language Institute
- Defense Language Aptitude Battery
- Defense Language Proficiency Tests
