= Kathleen Paige =

United States Navy officer

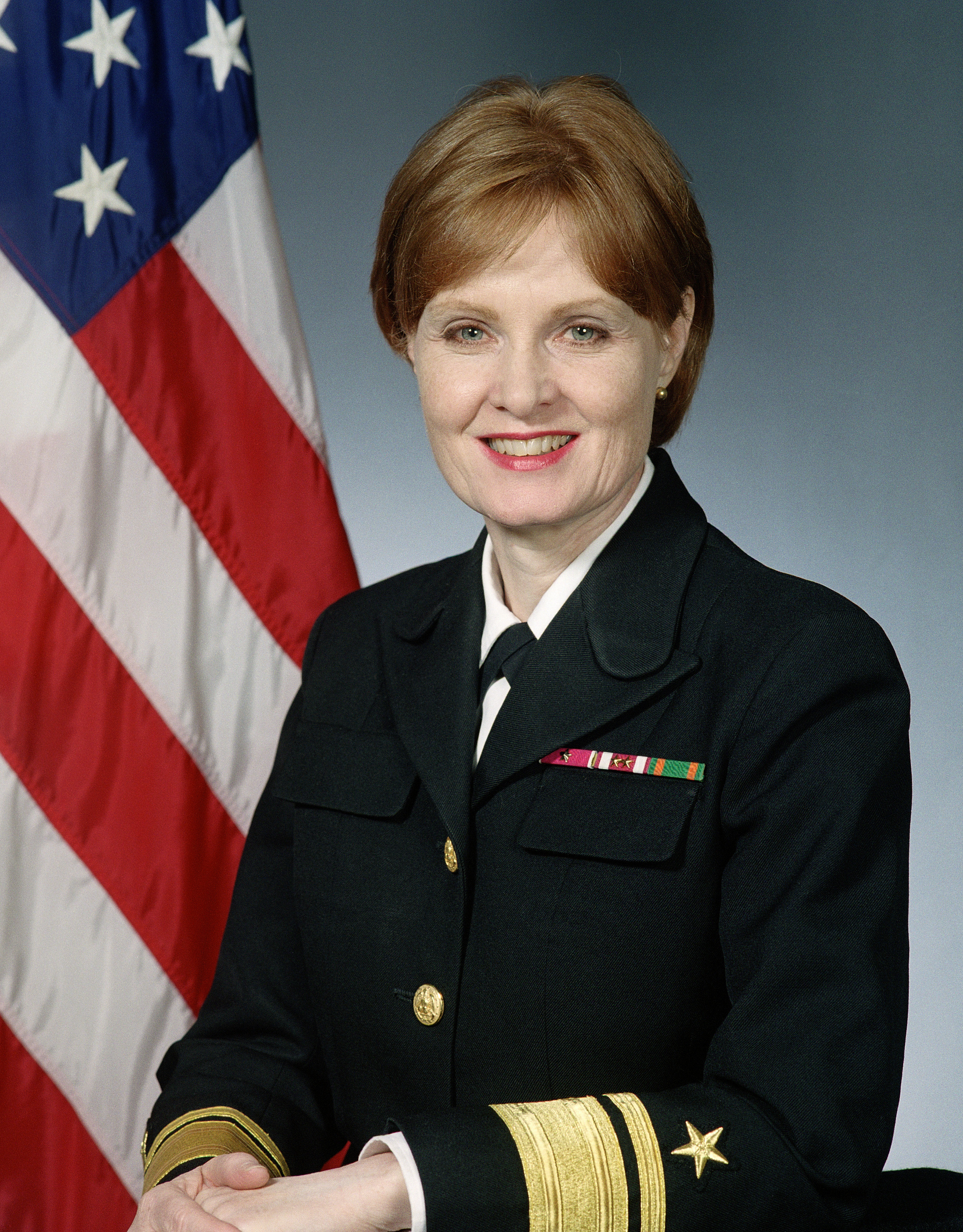
- Rear Admiral Kathleen K. Paige in 1998
- Born: August 30, 1948 (age 78); Schenectady, New York, U.S.
- Military career
- Allegiance: United States
- Branch: United States Navy
- Service years: 1971–2005
- Rank: Rear Admiral
- Nickname: Kate
- Commands: Naval Surface Warfare Center
- Awards: Defense Superior Service Medal; Legion of Merit (3); Meritorious Service Medal (3); Navy and Marine Corps Achievement Medal
- Other work: Missile Defense Advocacy Alliance board

Rear Admiral Kathleen Koehler Paige (born August 30, 1948) is a retired United States Navy officer. She was the Program Director, Aegis Ballistic Missile Defense (BMD), the sea-based element of the Ballistic Missile Defense System (BMDS) under development by the Missile Defense Agency (MDA). Rear Admiral Paige retired on 22 November 2005 after 34 years of active service. Paige currently serves on the Board of Managers for the Johns Hopkins Applied Physics Laboratory.

== Early life ==
Paige was born in Schenectady, New York, on August 30, 1948, and raised in Scotia, New York. Her grandmother, Mary Tobin, was a chief yeoman in World War I. She is a 1970 graduate of the University of New Hampshire and was commissioned into the United States Navy in 1971.

== Naval career ==
Paige's first tour of duty was at VFP-63, San Diego, California. Subsequent tours of duty included Fleet Combat Direction System Support Activity, San Diego; Acquisition Manager in the Navy's Standard Embedded Computer Resource Office, Arlington, Virginia; Aegis C3 Warfare Officer and Combat Systems Baseline Manager, Aegis Shipbuilding Program; Chief Engineer, Naval Surface Warfare Center, Port Hueneme Division; and Technical Director, Aegis Program Office.

Paige's first Flag Officer assignment was as Commander, Naval Surface Warfare Center, Arlington, Virginia, in July 1996. In June 1998, she assumed duties as the Director, Theater Air and Missile Defense and Systems Engineering (TAMD&SE) in the Program Executive Office for Theater Surface Combatants (PEO TSC). As Director, TAMD&SE, she led the Interoperability Task Force, which coordinated the joint efforts of five program offices across three Systems Commands to complete a successful Operational Evaluation of the Cooperative Engagement Capability (CEC). In April 1999, she was concurrently assigned as the first ASN (RDA) Chief Engineer, the Department of the Navy’s senior technical authority for the development of system and technical architectures designed to improve the integration and interoperability of Navy and Marine Corps weapon, combat, and C4I systems.

In July 2001, Paige became MDA's first Ballistic Missile Defense System Technical Director, the principal advisor to the MDA Director on all matters related to the planning and technical performance of the BMDS. In August 2002, she became the navy's senior Engineering Duty Officer (EDO).

Paige became Program Director, Aegis Ballistic Missile Defense (BMD) in March 2003 and in March 2005, concurrent with her Program Director assignment, Paige was selected by the Director, Missile Defense Agency to be the first Director of Mission Readiness.

== Education ==
In 1976, Paige received a Master of Science degree in Computer Systems from the Naval Postgraduate School. She was designated an Engineering Duty Officer (EDO) in 1981. While attending the Engineering Duty Officer Basic Course, she was awarded the VADM Bryan Award for academic excellence. She is a graduate of the Defense Systems Management College and the Cornell University Program for Executives.

== Awards and decorations ==
Paige's personal decorations include the Defense Superior Service Medal, the Legion of Merit (3 awards), the Meritorious Service Medal (3 awards), and the Navy and Marine Corps Achievement Medal.

== See also ==
Women in the United States Navy
