= List of United States Navy enlisted rates =

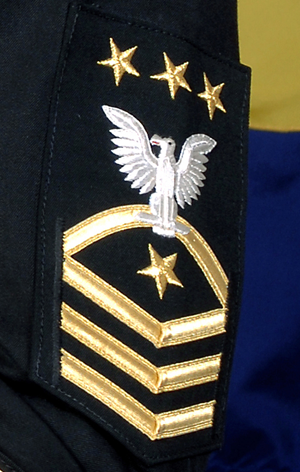
The badge of the Master Chief Petty Officer of the U.S. Navy, worn on a service dress blue uniform's sleeve

In the United States Navy, a rate is the military rank of an enlisted sailor, indicating where the sailor stands within the chain of command, and also defining one's pay grade. This is not to be confused with the term "rating", which refers to one's area of occupational specialization within the enlisted Navy (see below and also List of United States Navy ratings), or the term "rank", which in the U.S. Navy is only used for officers. Associated with the enlisted pay grades is a numbering system from the most junior enlisted sailor ("E-1") to the most senior enlisted sailor ("E-9"). This enlisted numbering system is the same across all six branches of the U.S. military. All E-1s through E-3s are known as seaman, fireman, airman, constructionman, or hospitalman. E-4 through E-6 are called petty officers. All E-7s are called chief petty officer, E-8s senior chief petty officer, and E-9s master chief petty officer. Rates are displayed on a rating badge, which is a combination of rate and rating. E-2s and E-3s have color-coded group rate marks based on their career field. Personnel in pay grade E-1, since 1996, do not have an insignia to wear.

Ratings are earned through "A" schools, which are attended before deployment and after undergoing initial basic training at Recruit Training Command, Great Lakes, Illinois, or (less commonly) by "striking" for a rating through on-the-job training (OJT) in the Fleet. Some sailors may undergo additional training in a "C" school either before or after a tour of duty. Upon completion, they are assigned a four-digit Navy Enlisted Classification (NEC) code, which identifies a specific skill within their standard rating. This defines what jobs they are qualified to do. For example, some billets might not only require a hospital corpsman first class, but might specify that they have NEC 8402 (Submarine Force Independent Duty), NEC 8403 (Fleet Marine Forces Reconnaissance Independent Duty Corpsman), or any other of several NECs depending upon the billet's requirements.

== History ==
On 29 September 2016, the United States Navy discontinued enlisted ratings after 241 years of use in an effort to modernize the classification system. Naval sailors were thereafter to be referred to solely by their rank and would hold a Navy Operations Specialty (NOS) instead of a rating. The rating symbols depicted for each rating badge listed below (except for the rating badge of a command master chief) is boatswain's mate. However, the decision was reversed and the rating system was restored in December 2016.

== E-1 to E-3 ==
Sailors in pay grades E-1 through E-3 are considered to be in apprenticeships while searching or in training for a career path. They are divided into five definable groups or job communities, with colored group rate marks designating the group to which they belong: seaman, fireman, airman, constructionman, and Hospitalman. One of three apprentice devices may be worn above the rank insignia, which denotes the sailor is an apprentice in a particular field and is in search of a rating to join. Sailors who have gone directly to a base, station, or ship without any specialized training are eligible to select a career field, and through correspondence courses and extensive on-the-job training, may qualify for a rating. This process is called "striking for a rating". If a sailor has qualified for a rate, but has not yet become a petty officer, they are called a designated striker, and are identified by a striker's badge that displays the sailor's rating, along with their group rate marks. The service member is addressed by one's group designation, if known (e.g., Fireman Jones, Constructionman Apprentice Smith); by the generic appellation "seaman"; or by one's striker designation (Boatswain's Mate Seaman Watson, Culinary Specialist Seaman Recruit Johnson). Those who have completed the "A" school for Hospital Corpsman wear their Caduceus above their stripes and substitute the word "Hospitalman" for "Seaman" in their rating titles.

In the September 2016 rating change, it was announced that only the "seaman" group would remain as the rate title for E-1, E-2, and E-3, with the others being retired. However, the Navy reversed this new policy three months later and reinstated the traditional rating system.

Sleeve insignia (winter)	Sleeve insignia (summer)	Cap and collar device		Rate title	U.S. DoD pay grade	Abbreviation	NATO code
Sleeve insignia (winter)	Sleeve insignia (summer)	Normal	Subdued	Rate title	U.S. DoD pay grade	Abbreviation	NATO code
No insignia				Seaman recruit, Hospitalman recruit	E-1	SR, HR	OR-1
No insignia				Fireman recruit	E-1	FR	OR-1
No insignia				Airman recruit	E-1	AR	OR-1
No insignia				Constructionman recruit	E-1	CR	OR-1
				Seaman apprentice, Hospitalman apprentice	E-2	SA, HA	OR-2
				Fireman apprentice	E-2	FA	OR-2
				Airman apprentice	E-2	AA	OR-2
				Constructionman apprentice	E-2	CA	OR-2
				Seaman, Hospitalman	E-3	SN, HN	OR-3
				Fireman	E-3	FN	OR-3
				Airman	E-3	AN	OR-3
				Constructionman	E-3	CN	OR-3

== E-4 to E-6 ==
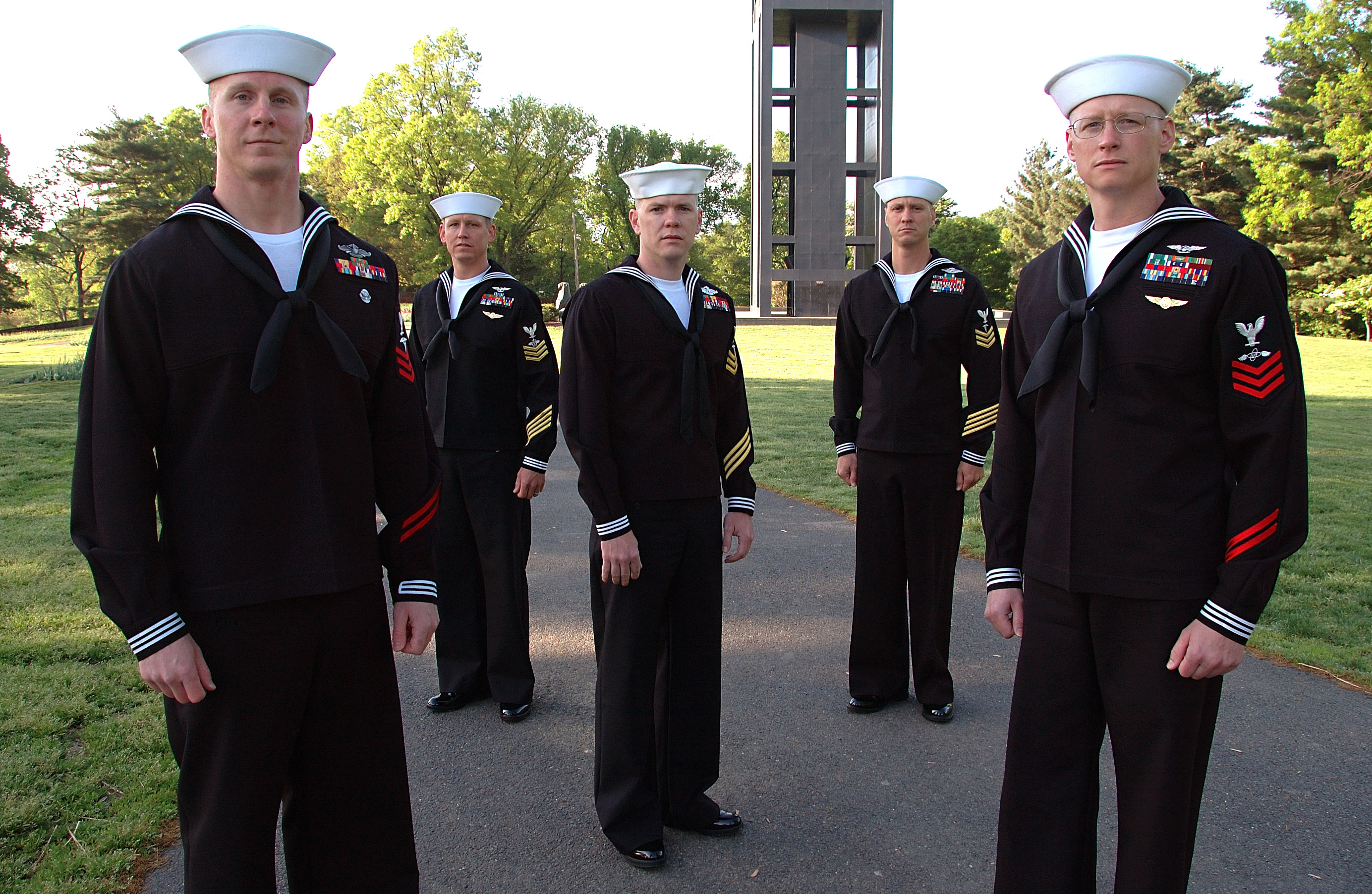
Petty officers in 2006 wearing service dress blue uniforms displaying both red and gold rating badges and service stripes

E-4 to E-6 are non-commissioned officers (NCOs), and are specifically called petty officers in the Navy. Petty officers perform not only the duties of their specific career field but also serve as leaders to junior enlisted personnel. They must take responsibility for their subordinates, address grievances, inform the chain of command on matters pertaining to good order and discipline, and may even have to place personnel on report. The title petty officer comes from the French word petit, meaning something small. In medieval England, villages had several "petite" or "petty" officers who were subordinate to major officials. Thus, petty officers are assistants to senior officers.

Petty officers have been an important part of the U.S. Navy since its beginning. They were originally appointed by the ship's captain and usually held such appointments while serving under the captain who selected them. The petty officers of this time did not have uniforms or a rank insignia. In 1841 a rate badge was assigned, consisting of a sleeve device displaying an eagle perched on an anchor. Rating marks did not appear until 1866.

From 1885 to 1894, the Navy recognized three classes of petty officers who were authorized to wear a "rate" (rank) insignia consisting of chevrons pointing down under a spread eagle and a rating mark. Unlike the current rate badge, the eagle faced right instead of left. The current insignia for petty officers came about in 1894, and is a perched eagle with spread wings (usually referred to as a "crow", due to its black color on white uniforms and the former light blue working uniforms) above a rating mark, with chevrons denoting their rate below. Initially, the eagle faced left or right on the rating emblem depending on which sleeve the badge was worn. "Seafarer" rates, such as boatswain or gunner, are unique to service aboard a ship, and were worn on the right sleeve; the eagle on these insignia faced right, so that they would be facing forward on the wearer. Other rates, such as administration or medical positions, were worn on the left sleeve, so the eagle on those insignia faced left, so that they would be facing forward on the wearer. In 1948, the Navy standardized all ratings to be worn on the left sleeve.

The authority to wear gold rating badges and service stripes on the dress blue uniform is granted when a sailor completes twelve consecutive years of service. Prior to June 2019, those years had to have been without any official record of bad conduct due to punitive action via non-judicial punishment or courts martial. During that time, the gold rating badges and service stripes were treated distinctly from the Good Conduct Medal, which was and is awarded for three consecutive years of "honorable service", defined as being free of disciplinary infractions.

Coloration of the insignia for E-4 through E-9 depends upon the uniform worn. Black cloth with red or gold embroidered stripes is used on the winter uniforms, while white cloth with black embroidered stripes is used on the summer uniforms, depending on whether or not they have less or more than 12 years of service, respectively.

Sleeve insignia (winter)		Sleeve insignia (summer)		Cap and collar devices			Chest insignia				Rate title	U.S. DoD pay grade	Abbreviation	NATO code
<12 Years	>12 Years	<12 Years	>12 Years	<12 Years	>12 Years	Subdued	NWU Type II	NWU Type III(Field)	NWU Type III		Rate title	U.S. DoD pay grade	Abbreviation	NATO code
<12 Years	>12 Years	<12 Years	>12 Years	<12 Years	>12 Years	Subdued	NWU Type II	NWU Type III(Field)	<12 Years	>12 Years	Rate title	U.S. DoD pay grade	Abbreviation	NATO code
											Petty officer third class	E-4	PO3	OR-4
											Petty officer second class	E-5	PO2	OR-5
											Petty officer first class	E-6	PO1	OR-6

== E-7 to E-9 ==
E-7 to E-9 are senior non-commissioned officers and are considered a separate community within the Navy. They have separate berthing and dining facilities (where feasible), wear separate uniforms, and perform separate duties. Advancement to chief petty officer (E-7) or above requires a board review by existing master chief petty officers beyond the normal examination score and performance evaluation process. The annual list of chief petty officer selectees is authorized by Congress.

The proper form of address to a chief petty officer is "Chief", "Senior chief" (or "Senior"), or "Master chief" according to their rate. In the U.S. Navy, chief petty officers are specifically tasked, in writing, with the duty of training junior officers (ensign, lieutenant (j.g.), and lieutenant).

Although the title "chief" has been around since the Continental Navy in 1776, the chief petty officer rate was not established until 1 April 1893. At that time nearly all sailors who had carried the rate of petty officer first class since 1885 were advanced to chief petty officer, with the exception of schoolmasters, ship's writers, and carpenter's mates.

The rates senior chief petty officer and master chief petty officer were established on 1 June 1958. To be eligible for advancement to senior chief petty officer, a chief petty officer must have had three years in the current grade. For advancement to master chief, a senior chief must have a total of three years in the current grade.

The dress blue insignia consists of a perched eagle (or "crow") with spread wings atop a rating mark, with three chevrons and one "rocker" above the rating mark. Inverted five-point stars above the crow denote the rank of senior chief (one star) or master chief (two stars). All other uniforms use the collar device to denote rank. It consists of a foul anchor with the initials U S N in silver, superimposed, with stars above the anchor to indicate higher pay grades, similar to the dress blue insignia.

Sleeve insignia		Shoulder insignia	Cap and Collar devices		Chest insignia			Rate title	U.S. DoD pay grade	Abbreviation	NATO code
<12 Years	>12 Years	Shoulder insignia	Normal	Subdued	NWU Type II	NWU Type III(Field)	NWU Type III	Rate title	U.S. DoD pay grade	Abbreviation	NATO code
								Chief petty officer	E-7	CPO	OR-7
								Senior chief petty officer	E-8	SCPO	OR-8
								Master chief petty officer	E-9	MCPO	OR-9

=== Command senior chief ===
On 30 July 2015, the Navy formally established the rating of command senior chief (CMDCS); before then from 2005 to 2015 it had been a billet instead of a rating. They typically serve at smaller commands that do not have a command master chief billet (CMDCM). A command senior chief career path feeds directly into the command master chief program, and is a permanent rank, unlike their U.S. Air Force first sergeant, E-8 paygrade counterparts.

=== Command master chief ===
A command master chief is considered to be the senior-most enlisted service member within a command, and is the special assistant to the commanding officer in all matters pertaining to the health, welfare, job satisfaction, morale, utilization, advancement and training of the command's enlisted personnel. Command master chiefs can be Command level (within a single unit, such as a ship or shore station), Fleet level (squadrons consisting of multiple operational units, headed by a flag officer or commodore), or Force level (consisting of a separate community within the Navy, such as Subsurface, Air, Reserves). After attaining the rate of master chief petty officer, a sailor may choose to further their career by becoming a command master chief petty officer.

Both command senior chief and command master chief existed as a position before being authorized as separate rates/rank. For example, there could be a senior chief boatswain's mate acting as command senior chief or a master chief personnelman who acts as the command master chief.

The command master chief rate insignia are similar to the insignia for master chief, except that the rating symbol is replaced by an inverted five-point star, reflecting a change in their rating from their previous rating (e.g. MMCM) to CMDCM. The stars for command master chief are silver, while stars for fleet or force master chief are gold. Additionally, command master chiefs, wear a badge, worn on their left breast pocket (for males) or above the nametag (for females), denoting their title (Command/Fleet/Force).

=== Fleet master chief and force master chief ===
Fleet and force master chiefs are appointed by the commander of a fleet or a force command, to serve as their senior enlisted adviser. They have virtually the same responsibilities as command master chiefs, but for larger fleet or force commands rather than a single unit. These two ranks are equivalent and their insignia is also the same—a master chief rating badge with two gold stars above the eagle and a gold star for the rating insignia.

Sleeve insignia		Shoulder insignia	Cap and Collar devices		Chest insignia			Badges		Rate title	U.S. DoD pay grade	Abbreviation	NATO code
Incumbent	Post Tour	Shoulder insignia	Normal	Subdued	NWU Type II	NWU Type III(Field)	NWU Type III	NWU Type III	Regular	Rate title	U.S. DoD pay grade	Abbreviation	NATO code
										Command senior chief petty officer	E-8	CMDCS	OR-8
										Command master chief petty officer	E-9	CMDCM	OR-9
										Force master chief petty officer	E-9	FORCM	OR-9
										Fleet master chief petty officer	E-9	FLTCM	OR-9

=== Master Chief Petty Officer of the Navy ===
The Master Chief Petty Officer of the Navy (MCPON) is the senior enlisted person in the Navy, appointed by the Chief of Naval Operations (CNO) to serve as a spokesperson to address the issues of enlisted personnel to the highest positions in the Navy. The MCPON is the senior enlisted advisor to the Chief of Naval Operations and Chief of Naval Personnel. Exact duties vary, depending on the CNO, though the duties generally include traveling throughout the Navy, observing training and talking to sailors and their families. The MCPON serves on several boards concerned with enlisted members, represents the Department of the Navy at special events, and may be called upon to testify before Congress regarding enlisted personnel issues.

The position was originally established as "Senior Enlisted Advisor of the Navy" in January 1967 in response to a recommendation from the Secretary of the Navy's task force on Navy personnel retention. Three months later, the title was officially changed to "Master Chief Petty Officer of the Navy". The individual rating specialty marks for the MCPON was replaced by an inverted star in 1971.

The MCPON's current insignia is similar to that of Fleet, Force, or CMDCMs, with the addition of a third star above the perched eagle or anchor. Uniform regulations also provides a "post tour" rank and rating wear of a MCPON, replacing the center gold star with a gold specialty rating. However to date, no MCPON has ever been retained in the Navy after leaving the assignment.

=== Senior Enlisted Advisor to the Chairman ===
The Senior Enlisted Advisor to the Chairman (SEAC) is the senior enlisted person appointed by the Chairman of the Joint Chiefs of Staff (CJCS) to serve as a spokesperson to address the issues of enlisted personnel to the highest positions in the Department of Defense. The SEAC can be chosen from any one of the five military services and is considered the most senior non-commissioned officer (NCO) position overall in the United States Armed Forces.

The position was first established in 2005 but was briefly discontinued in 2008 when then incoming chairman, Admiral Mike Mullen, elected not to appoint anyone to the position. It was then reinstated by his successor in 2011 and has continued ever since.

In 2019 each branch was tasked with creating a unique rank insignia for the SEAC. The Navy approved their version of the SEAC insignia by 2023. To date, only one Navy enlisted sailor has ever been appointed as SEAC.

Sleeve insignia		Shoulder insignia	Cap and Collar devices		Chest Insignia			Badges		Rate title	U.S. DoD pay grade	Acronym	NATO code
Incumbent	Post Tour	Shoulder insignia	Normal	Subdued	NWU Type II	NWU Type III(Field)	NWU Type III	NWU Type III	Regular	Rate title	U.S. DoD pay grade	Acronym	NATO code
										Master Chief Petty Officer of the Navy	Special	MCPON	OR-9
										Senior Enlisted Advisor to the Chairman	Special	SEAC	OR-9

== See also ==
- Badges of the United States Navy
- List of United States naval officer designators
- List of United States Coast Guard enlisted rates
- List of United States Coast Guard ratings
- List of United States Navy enlisted warfare designations
- List of United States Navy ratings
- List of United States Navy staff corps
- Military Occupational Specialty
- Uniforms of the United States Navy
- United States Navy officer rank insignia
- Service stripes
