= Submarine Warfare insignia =

US Navy uniform badge

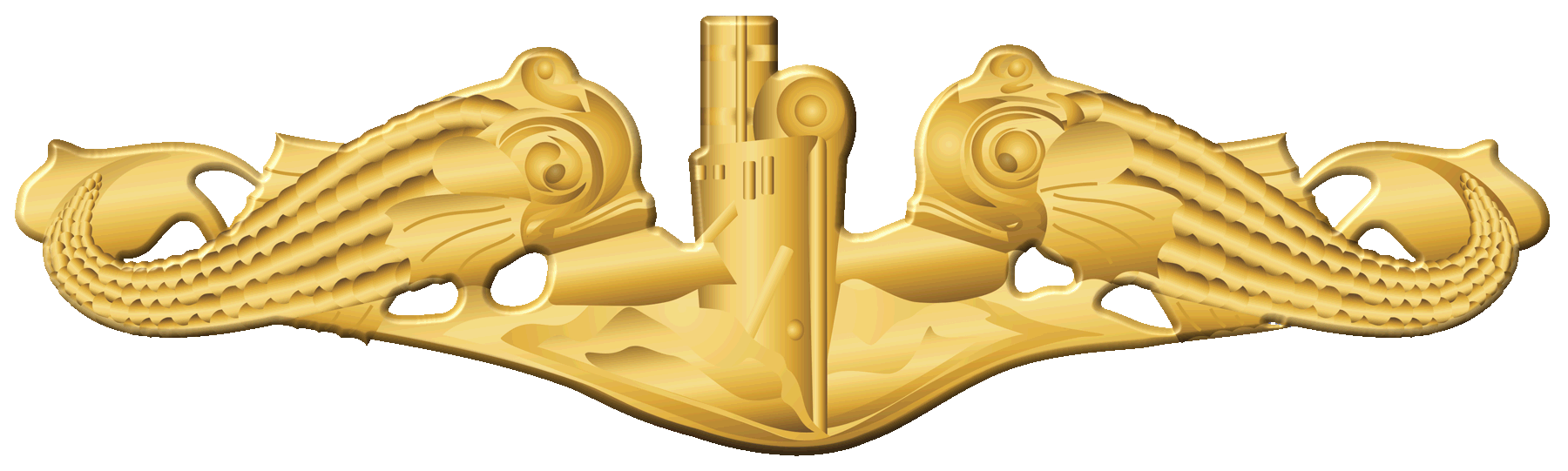
U.S. Navy officer submarine badge in gold

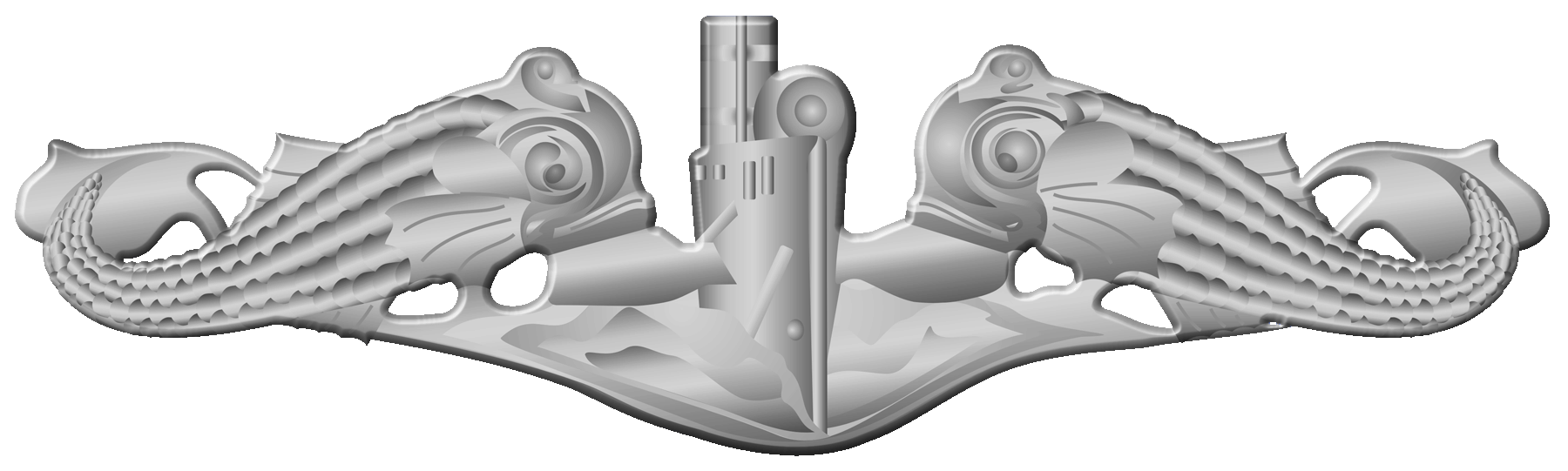
U.S. Navy enlisted submarine badge in silver

The Submarine Warfare Insignia (usually known as '"Dolphins"') are worn by qualified submariners.

United States Navy Officers and Enlisted Sailors wear a uniform breast pin to indicate that they are qualified in submarines.

The Submarine Warfare Insignia is considered one of the Navy's three major enlisted warfare pins, along with the Surface Warfare Badge and the Enlisted Aviation Warfare Specialist insignia. To earn the right to wear "dolphins", prospective submariners complete an extensive qualification process that lasts about one year (for both enlisted and officers, though the two programs differ significantly) and covers all of the submarine's systems.

== History ==
On 13 June 1923, Captain Ernest J. King, Commander, Submarine Division Three (later Fleet Admiral and Chief of Naval Operations during World War II), suggested to the Secretary of the Navy (Bureau of Navigation) that a distinguishing device for qualified submariners be adopted. He submitted a pen-and-ink sketch of his own showing a shield mounted on the beam ends of a submarine, with dolphins forward of, and abaft, the conning tower. The suggestion was strongly endorsed by Commander Submarine Division Atlantic.

Over the next several months the Bureau of Navigation (now known as BUPERS) solicited additional designs from several sources. Some combined a submarine with a shark motif. Others showed submarines and dolphins, and still others used a shield design. A Philadelphia firm, which had done work for the Navy in the field of United States Naval Academy class rings, was approached by the Bureau of Navigation with the request that it design a suitable badge.

Two designs were submitted by the firm, but these were ultimately combined into a single design. It was a bow view of a submarine, proceeding on the surface, with bow planes rigged for diving, flanked by dolphins (in the form of artistically stylized heraldic dolphins), in a horizontal position with their heads resting on the upper edge of the bow planes.

Today a similar design is used: two Mahi-mahi, commonly known as dolphin fish, flanking the bow and conning tower of a submarine. On 20 March 1924, the Chief of the Bureau of Navigation recommended to the Secretary of the Navy that the design be adopted. The recommendation was accepted by Theodore Roosevelt Jr., Acting Secretary of the Navy.

Originally, the submarine insignia was to be worn by officers and men qualified in submarine duty only when attached to submarine units or submarine command organizations. The right to wear the pin was revoked if the service member transferred to a non-submarine billet. In 1941 the Uniform Regulations were modified to permit a service member to wear the submarine insignia for the duration of their career, once so authorized.

=== Appearance ===
The officers' insignia was at first a bronze, gold-plated metal pin, worn centered above the left breast pocket and above the ribbons and medals. Enlisted men wore an embroidered insignia sewn on the outside of the right sleeve, midway between the wrist and elbow. The device was two and three-quarters inches long, embroidered in white silk for blue clothing and vice versa. In 1943, the Uniform Regulations were modified to provide that

"Enlisted men, who are qualified and subsequently promoted to commissioned or warrant ranks, may wear enlisted submarine insignia on the left breast until they qualify as submarine officers, at which time this insignia would be replaced by the officers' submarine pin."

In mid-1947, the embroidered device shifted from the sleeve of the enlisted men's jumper to above the left breast pocket. A change to the Uniform Regulations dated 21 September 1950 authorized the embroidered insignia for officers (in addition to the pin-on insignia) and a bronze, silver-plated, pin-on insignia for enlisted men (in addition to the embroidered device).

Over the years a number of minor design variations, particularly in the appearance of the bow waves, have occurred. Various unofficial or commemorative badges based on the device have also been made, and may have occasionally been worn with the tacit approval of local naval authorities. The 1971 diesel boats forever pin would be an example of this type.

In the modern Navy, the submarine pin is either a silver or gold chest pin, worn above all ribbons unless a second superseding qualification has been achieved in which case the submarine pin is worn below ribbons on the breast pocket. An embroidered patch, rather than the pin, is worn above the left breast pocket of working uniforms.

== Basic enlisted submarine qualifications ==
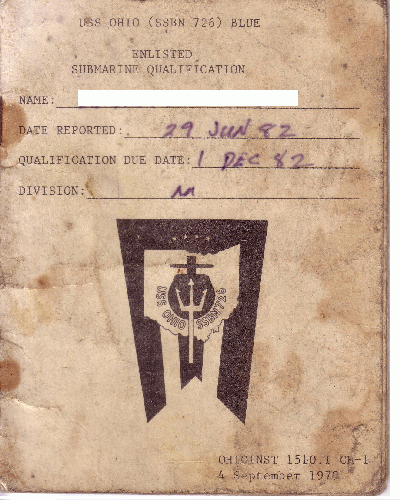
This enlisted submarine qualification booklet—"qual card"—was completed during the Cold War.

Upon reporting to their first submarine the unqualified submarine sailor completes a few days of education and is then assigned a Qualification Card, a qualification due date, and a command sponsor (informally known as Sea Dad or Sea Mom). The assigned sponsor monitors the non-qual's (qualifier's) progress during the qualification process and their adaptation to life aboard the boat. No one is exempted from the qualification process and no concessions are made to rank or rate.

Although submarine qualification methodology has changed throughout the decades, the basic goal has remained: 1) to provide the submarine sailor with a basic knowledge of all systems on board, their uses, operations, and interrelationships with other systems and 2) to ensure all personnel can operate effectively under pressure in shipboard situations. Submarine damage control techniques are stressed throughout the qualification process.

Progress is tracked by a Petty Officer First Class deemed as the Ship's Qualification Coordinator. Each item on the qualification card is worth a specified number of points; unqualified sailors must obtain a predetermined number of points per week. Failure to achieve the required number results in placement on a "delinquent list" (Dinq or Dink) and the assignment of additional study, monitored by their sponsor. Repeated failure to obtain required points might result in the Sailor being restricted to the Boat until he/she is caught up. Each system signature is weighted and each phase has a maximum number of points.

The qualifications process aboard the boat uses publications, training videos, computer programs and hands-on training with qualified personnel, but the principal focus is on the actual operation of the damage control, atmosphere control, weapons, countermeasures, reactor, mechanical, hydraulic, pneumatic, electrical, and electronic systems on that particular submarine. Once the qualifying sailor feels they have the requisite knowledge for the system, they will ask a designated Qualification Petty Officer (QPO — an expert on the system in question) for a "checkout". The QPO will ask prepared questions concerning the system. They can also ask the sailor to draw a line diagram and explain the system in various states and configurations. If the QPO feels the sailor has met their expectations, they will sign the sailor's card and those points will be included in the sailor's weekly point count. If the QPO is not satisfied with the sailor's knowledge level, they will be dismissed to study further and return once the required knowledge threshold has been met.

The qualification structure can be broken down into phases. The example listed below is only a basic guide and is not the rule for all submarines. For most phases of qualification, knowledge of basic rather than elaborate equipment operations is required, with the exception of damage control equipment and procedures. Among the most important goals of submarine qualification is providing each member of the crew, regardless of designated specialty or task, with the training to combat emergencies anywhere on the submarine. In case of fire, flooding, or other casualty, each submarine sailor must be confident that they can trust the sailor next to them to know the purpose, location, and proper use of each item of damage control equipment, as well as the location and operation of isolations for each electrical/air/hydraulic system.

=== Qualification blocks ===
- Damage Control Phase: This phase emphasizes the construction and support systems for the specific submarine to which the sailor is assigned.
  - Internal Communication Circuits
  - Sound Powered Phone Circuits
  - Emergency Alarms
  - Damage Control equipment location and proper utilization is stressed.
- Propulsion Phase
  - Ship's Propulsion Plant
  - Electrical Plant Systems
  - Primary and Auxiliary Propulsion Equipment
- Auxiliary Systems Phase
  - Ship's Main, Service and Plane Control Hydraulics Systems
  - Potable water systems
  - Ship's Air Systems, Including High Pressure, Ship's Service and Salvage Air Systems.
  - Air Conditioning and Refrigeration
  - Atmospheric Monitoring Systems
  - Depth Sensing Systems
  - Sea Water and Ballasting Systems
  - Chemical Holding and Treatment (sanitation and waste water)
- Electronic Equipment and Navigation
  - Electronic Sensor Monitoring Systems
  - External Communications Systems
  - Navigation Systems
- Combat Systems
  - Torpedo and Tactical Missile Fire Control Systems
  - Ballistic Missile Fire Control Systems (SSBN's only)
  - Torpedo Tube Systems
  - Sonar Systems
  - External Countermeasure Systems and Launchers

=== Block Reviews and Walkthroughs ===
Each phase (or "block") of the qualification card has an overall "block review" where the qualifier ties in all the phase's systems and is verbally tested for their level of knowledge.

After completion of all blocks, the qualifier must complete compartment walkthroughs, where a senior, qualified sailor quizzes the qualifier as they walk through the submarine. If all walkthroughs are completed successfully, the qualifier's chain of command recommends that they be examined by a qualification board.

=== The "Qual Board" ===
This is the most challenging part of the new qualifier's qualification process. The board is made up of a submarine-qualified officer, a chief petty officer and a petty officer. Submarine damage control is the biggest factor discussed during the board.

During the board, the examinee may be asked to draw and explain any of the systems they have learned about during the qualification process. After the board the examinee is dismissed and evaluated by the members of the board. If the examinee passes the board, they are then recommended for qualification to the commanding officer of the submarine.

Some boats have implemented an idea requiring the qualifier to perform on their feet, called a "Snapshot Board". Qualified personnel set simulations for the qualifier to treat as a real casualty. They have to make initial emergency report then lead the fight against the casualty. This type of board was formed to assure the qualifier has practical knowledge, not just "book smarts".

The commanding officer reviews the board's recommendation, and, upon concurrence, the newly qualified individual is presented their "Dolphins" by the skipper and designated as "Qualified in Submarines". The Dolphins presentation is considered an important event as it means the newly qualified submariner will be treated as a full member of the submarine crew. Although not condoned by senior supervisory personnel, the tradition of "tacking on" the decoration, whereby other qualified sailors punch the dolphin badge while worn on the newly qualified sailors breast is a time-honored tradition, done in much the same way as "tacking on" the decoration of newly promoted 3rd Class Petty Officers has been tolerated. With the introduction of Women on Submarines however, this time-honored tradition most likely will no longer be tolerated by the Command.

Appropriate annotations are made in the new submariner's service jacket to reflect qualification. Submarine qualified personnel are designated "SS" after the rate, such as STS1(SS) or MMN2(SS). The "SS" stands for submarine specialist.

=== Post-qualification life ===
After the sailor is designated "Qualified in Submarines", they are treated with a greater amount of respect and given more responsibility. They are required to continually qualify in areas other than their primary duty. This is to ensure in-depth cross-training is accomplished. This process continues throughout a submarine sailor's tour. In addition to the basic submarine qualification process and their requirement to qualify in their most senior in-rate watch station, a submarine sailor usually will become qualified in numerous in-port and at-sea watch stations not directly related to their own specific rating.

When a submarine sailor ordered to serve a tour ashore returns to sea duty (or whenever ordered from a boat to another submarine of a class on which they have not already sailed and earned their qualifications), they are again required to "re-qualify" on the new submarine. This qualification is normally completed by a walkthrough check with a senior qualified member of their chain of command or a submarine-qualified officer.

== Officer submarine qualifications ==
In principle, the officer submarine qualifications are very similar to the enlisted submarine qualifications - they are designed to ensure that each junior officer has a basic level of knowledge of all the major systems on board the boat, and is capable of performing damage control efforts throughout the submarine. However, the Officer Qualification goes well beyond the basics of system knowledge and damage control that are required for enlisted personnel. The Officer Qualification is based heavily on the officer's ability to drive, and fight, the ship.

The newly reported junior officer (JO) starts with smaller qualifications, including "Basic Engineering Qualifications", Battery Charging Line-up Officer, Rig for Dive Officer and Periscope Operator. These initial qualifications enable the JO to support their fellow officers by performing important (but tedious and sometimes time-intensive) tasks.

While the various qualification cards that compose the officer's qualification package are usually pursued in parallel, the focus for the first few months aboard is decidedly engineering. After having completed a year of nuclear power training, the new JO will learn the engineering systems of their new submarine and qualify as Engineering Officer of the Watch (EOOW) and Engineering Duty Officer (EDO). These are, respectively, the underway and in-port watch stations ultimately responsible for the supervision, maintenance, and safe operation of the submarine's nuclear power plant and associated engineering systems.

With EOOW and EDO under their belt, the JO can pursue tactical (or "forward") qualifications. First comes Contact Manager, the officer or senior enlisted who assists the Officer of the Deck (OOD) track other vessels and maintain safe navigation surfaced or submerged. Next comes part of the qualifications for Diving Officer of the Watch (DOOW), the officer or senior enlisted who supervises the Ship's Control Party in safely driving the ship and properly executing casualty procedures. Upon completion of EOOW and DOOW, the JO has acquired most of the systems knowledge and will focus on their tactical development.

Finally, the JO will complete their officer of the deck (OOD) and ship's duty officer (SDO) qualifications. (The OOD qualification is actually two qualifications, one for when the submarine is surfaced and one for when it is submerged.) Like EOOW and EDO, the OOD and SDO are the officers who supervise the ship's operations underway and in-port. They are at all times the direct representative of the submarine's commanding officer, acting on their behalf whether it be tactical employment or in-port force protection.

As with the enlisted qualifications, upon completion of their Qualification Card, the junior officer must complete a Qualification Board, although by this point they have already stood half a dozen qualification boards for their subordinate qualifications. In an officer's case, the board is led by the commanding officer. Finally, the officer must be observed by an officer of command rank other than their commanding officer, in performing the duties of OOD, including the taking of the ship to sea and returning to port and docking. If the junior officer passes their Qualification Board, the commanding officer recommends to the squadron commodore (a post-command officer) that the junior officer be qualified in submarines.

== Medical Officer ==
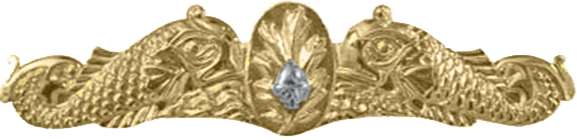
Submarine Medical Officer qualification insignia

To be a candidate for designation as a submarine medical officer, said officer must be a graduate of a prescribed undersea medical officer’s course given at the Naval Undersea Medical Institute; successfully pass a comprehensive qualification examination to be completed during the first undersea medical assignment; prepare an acceptable thesis, technical paper, or project on some phase of undersea medicine; complete a submarine qualification card supplied by NUMI; and have served on board a submarine for a total of 30 days (not necessarily consecutive); and be recommended by the commanding officer (CO) and (where appropriate) by the CO of the operational unit to which assigned for additional duty (e.g., squadron commander).

== Supply Officer ==
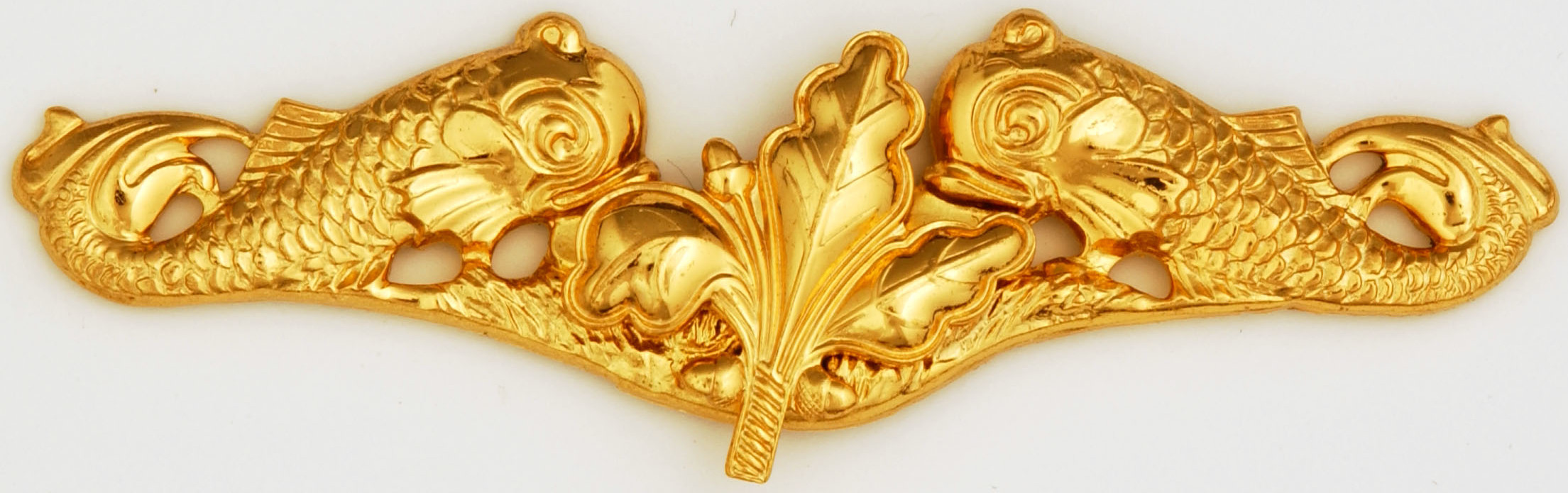
Submarine Supply Officer qualification insignia

Requirements for designation as “Supply Corps Officer, Qualified in Submarines” are to serve on board an operational submarine at least 1 year; complete qualification as Diving Officer of the Watch/General Submarines; be an effective Supply Corps Officer; successfully pass Logistics Management Assessment (LMA); display basic knowledge of ship systems, equipment, and capabilities; perform as a member of the Fire Control Party; have knowledge and ability to perform casualty, damage control, and organize and direct submarine escape procedures; display satisfactory leadership qualities and temperament suited to submarine duty; and pass a Verbal Qualification Board by superior command. Supply Officers should normally complete qualification within two years.

== Engineering Duty Officer ==
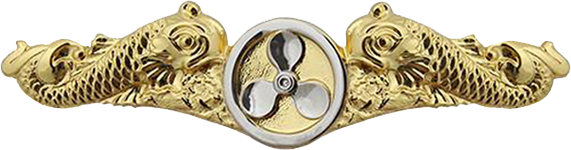
Submarine Engineering Duty Officer qualification insignia

Requirements for designation as Submarine Engineering Duty Officer includes completing the Submarine Officer Basic Course; completing an SSBN Patrol for a total of 13 weeks are devoted to participation in submarine operations as a member of ship’s company in order to gain experience in submarine systems, equipment, and operations; observe and participate in the extensive industrial effort required to prepare the ship for extended operations; assist in preparation of the work package for the next availability following the officer’s shipboard assignment; as a minimum, the candidate should complete Diving Officer of the Watch Qualification during assignment(s) to the submarine; Qualification as Officer of the Deck is encouraged; must also complete Nuclear Ship Superintendent Qualification; complete Industrial Training for 1 year in a submarine related waterfront assignment at a nuclear shipyard or SOS is required; and complete a Qualification Journal. The candidate will then be ordered to Washington, DC for an oral examination by a board appointed by the CHNAVPERS and composed of at least three submarine qualified captains, one of whom must be an Unrestricted Line Officer.

== Unofficial Submarine Insignia ==
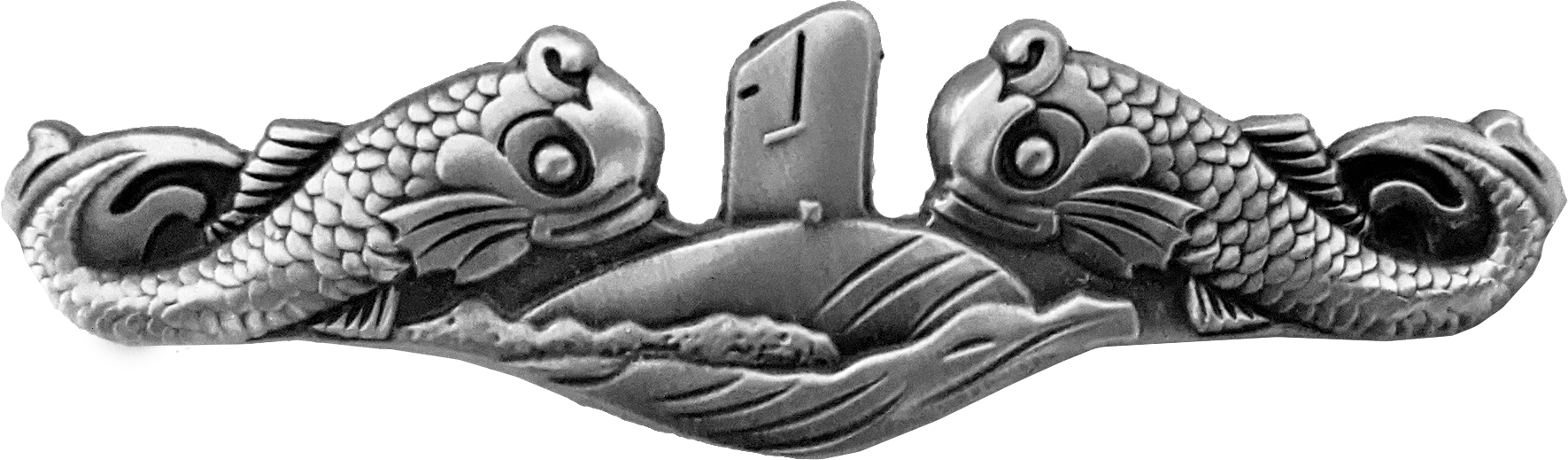
Enlisted submarine qualification insignia that uses a Seawolf-class submarine.

The U.S. Navy Submarine Force has unofficial badges that are part of the submarine heritage. When qualifying aboard the Seawolf-class submarine, an unofficial insignia is awarded that features the SSN-21 class submarine in the center of the insignia.

== Other countries' insignia ==
=== Australia ===
In the Royal Australian Navy Submarine Service, sailors who qualify as submariners are awarded a badge depicting two dolphins and a crown. This badge (known as a sailor's 'dolphins') was designed by Commander Alan McIntosh and was introduced in 1966.

=== United Kingdom ===
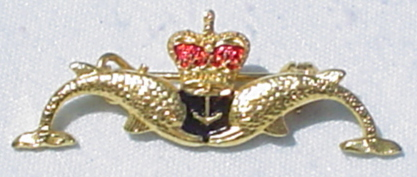
Royal Navy Submarine Service dolphin badge

The British Royal Navy Submarine Service first issued badges to crew members during the 1950s, and adopted the current badge depicting two dolphins and a crowned anchor in 1972. The "dolphin" is a second specialisation earned after completing initial training in a chosen trade.

=== France ===
The French Navy has three levels of badges:

- Basic level: For beginners in the world of submariners, who have succeeded in a course and the final exam (Certificat Elementaire de sous-marinier or CE)
- Superior level: For confirmed submariners who have succeeded in the exam (Certificat Supérieur de sous-marinier or CS)
- Officer in command: For actual or former officers in command of submarine (Commandant de sous-marin)

The first two can be worn by officers or enlisted.

== See also ==
- Military badges of the United States
- Obsolete badges of the United States military
- List of United States Navy enlisted warfare designations
- Badges of the United States Navy
- Uniforms of the United States Navy

== Sources ==
- MILPERSMAN 1200-010: SUBMARINE PATROL INSIGNIA QUALIFICATIONS, a public domain publication of the United States Navy's Bureau of Personnel
