= Unrestricted line officer =

United States Navy officer

An unrestricted line officer (shortened to URL officer) is a designator given to a commissioned officer of the line in the United States Navy, who is eligible for command at sea of the navy's warfighting combatant units such as warships, submarines, aviation squadrons and SEAL teams. They are also eligible to command the higher echelons of those units, such as destroyer and submarine squadrons, air wings and air groups, and special warfare groups.

At the flag officer level, URL officers may also command carrier strike groups, expeditionary strike groups, patrol and reconnaissance groups, task forces, and fleet and force commands. URL officers are also eligible to command shore installations, facilities and activities directly supporting the navy's warfare mission.

== Specialities ==
URL officers include officers from the Surface Warfare, Submarine Warfare, Naval Aviation, and Special Warfare communities, i.e., the Navy's combat communities. In this sense, all URL officers are considered warfare specialists and are designated as either Surface Warfare Officers, Submarine Warfare Officers, Naval Aviators, Naval Flight Officers, SEAL/Special Warfare Officers, or Special Operations Officers (primarily Diver or Explosive Ordnance Disposal (EOD) Officer/Diver).

A URL community previously known as General Unrestricted Line has been phased out and no longer accepting new entrants. Officers in this category were not warfare qualified, nor on track to be warfare qualified, and were typically assigned to administrative and support tasks ashore. General URL officers have been replaced by the expansion of the Restricted Line Officer (RL) community into their former skillsets, with most incumbents laterally transferring into the Restricted Line.

== Comparison to other types of officers ==
=== Restricted line ===
Differentiated from URL officers are those naval officers whose functions are considered combat support in nature and are designated as either restricted line (RL) officers or staff corps officers.

Examples of RL officers include Engineering Duty Officer, Aeronautical Engineering Duty Officer, Aircraft Maintenance Officer, Intelligence Officer, Cryptologic Warfare (formerly Information Warfare) Officer, Meteorology/Oceanography Officer, Public Affairs Officer, Human Resources Officer, and Foreign Area Officer among others.

Examples of Staff Corps officers include Supply Corps, Medical Corps, Dental Corps, Medical Service Corps, Nurse Corps, Civil Engineer Corps, Judge Advocate General's Corps and Chaplain Corps.

Some RL officers begin their careers as URL officers and transition to RL, the most common examples being Surface Warfare Officers and Submarine Warfare Officers who become Engineering Duty Officers and Naval Aviators and Naval Flight Officers who become Aeronautical Engineering Duty Officers. Still, other URL officers will transition into Staff Corps communities, most often the Medical Corps or the Judge Advocate General's Corps following completion of Navy-funded medical school or law school, while others move into other RL or Staff Corps fields. The remaining officers are directly commissioned as RL or Staff Corps. RL and Staff Corps officers are authorized to command ashore within their particular speciality, but are not eligible for combatant command at sea, which remains strictly within the purview of URL officers.

=== Limited duty officers and chief warrant officers ===
In contrast to the U.S. Navy's limited duty officers (LDO) and chief warrant officers (CWO), who are directly accessed from the senior enlisted grades (E-6 to E-9 and W-2 to W-5 for LDO; E-7 to E-9 for CWO), traditional unrestricted line officers are required to possess at least a bachelor's degree and complete some type of formal pre-commissioning accession program, such as:

- United States Naval Academy (USNA)
- Naval Reserve Officer Training Corps (NROTC), which also includes the Seaman to Admiral-21 Program
- Officer Candidate School (OCS).

Some senior URL officers in current service as naval aviators or naval flight officers were also commissioned via the since disestablished Aviation Officer Candidate School (AOCS), either under traditional AOCS or via its former subset Aviation Reserve Officer Candidate (AVROC) or Naval Aviation Cadet (NAVCAD) programs. AOCS was merged into the current Officer Candidate School in the late 1990s.

== History ==
The United States Navy takes most of its traditions, customs and organizational structure from that of the Royal Navy of Great Britain. Based on the Royal Navy model, there were originally two kinds of officers on a naval ship of the line: the commanding officers and their lieutenants, who were gentlemen and commanded the ship; and the warrant officers, who were technical specialists who ran important tasks. In the nineteenth century, with the introduction of steam power, a third group of officers emerged, engineers, who ran the steam plant. As technology developed, the engineers were requesting more rights, including command. This system evolved in similar fashion in the Continental Navy during the American Revolutionary War and in the successor United States Navy into the nineteenth century. Eventually, this dispute led the Department of the Navy to abolish the differences between the groups, amalgamating them into Unrestricted Line Officers in 1899. This fact can lead to confusion with non-American naval personnel, lacking the division between the two groups. The Russian Navy is an example of one with a difference between Deck and Engineer officers.

== See also ==
- List of Naval Officer Designators
