= Medical Corps (United States Navy) =

Medical-focused staff corps of the United States Navy

United States Navy Medical Corps
- Seal of the United States Navy Medical Corps
- Founded: March 3, 1871; 155 years ago
- Country: United States of America
- Branch: United States Navy

The Medical Corps of the United States Navy is a staff corps consisting of military physicians in a variety of specialties. It is the senior corps among all staff corps, second in precedence only to line officers. The corps of commissioned officers was founded on March 3, 1871.

Prior to the formal establishment of the corps, ships’ surgeons served without commissions, unless given one by the commanding officer. Those commissions would be for the duration of a specific cruise.

The Medical Corps is one of the four staff corps of the Navy's Bureau of Medicine and Surgery (BUMED), which is led by the Surgeon General of the United States Navy.

Facing a shortage of trained physicians to serve the needs of the Navy and Marine Corps, the Uniformed Services Health Professions Revitalization Act of 1972 was passed. This was a two-pronged act in which the Uniformed Services University of the Health Sciences and the Health Professions Scholarship Program were created. In both programs, civilians are given a direct commission to the rank of ensign (O-1) in the United States Navy Reserve which they hold throughout the four years of their medical education. During this time they receive financial assistance on the condition that they meet reservist requirements, maintain military standards, and agree to serve on active duty as physicians. The commitment required is at least 4 years for HPSP and 7 years of service for USUHS students.

Upon graduation, the new physicians are promoted to the rank of lieutenant (O-3) and enter active duty as medical interns (PGY-1) at a Naval Hospital.

Upon completion of an internship year, a Navy physician can be deployed to the fleet as a General Medical Officer, though opportunities also exist to complete full-residency training in the specialty of their choice or undergo 6 months of training to become a Flight Surgeon or Undersea Medical Officer .

RADM Bruce L. Gillingham is the 39th Surgeon General of the United States Navy as of 2019 and is the highest-ranking officer of the Medical Corps. The Chief of the Medical Corps is RDML Guido F. Valdes, who concurrently serves as Commander, Naval Medical Forces Pacific.

== Qualifications and designations ==
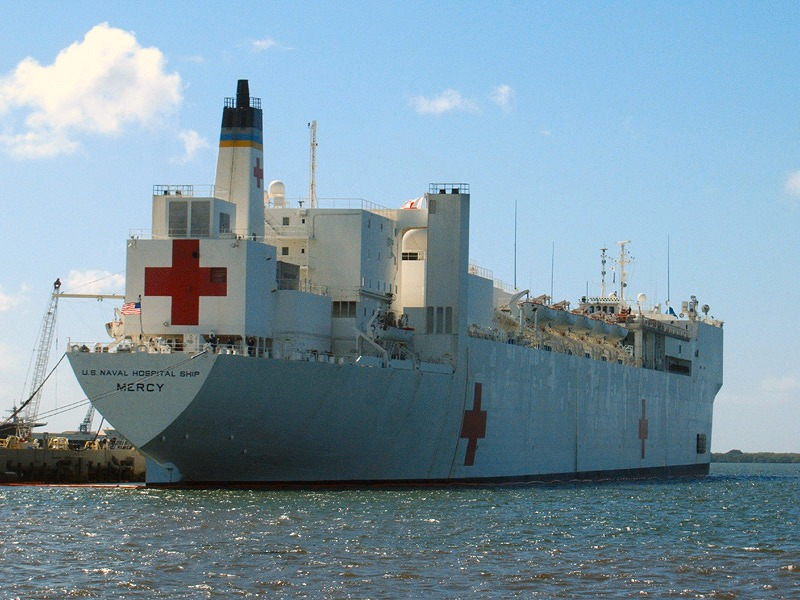
USNS Mercy, a U.S. Navy hospital ship

Members of the Medical Corps are eligible to pursue qualification programs that lead to breast insignia such as:

- Flight Surgeon Insignia (USA, USN, USAF)
- Astronaut Badge
- Surface Warfare Medical Corps Insignia
- Submarine Medical Insignia
- Diving (Medical) Insignia
- Fleet Marine Force Insignia
- Master Parachutist Badge
- Seabee combat warfare specialist insignia

== Ships named after physicians ==
Reference: Dictionary of American Naval Fighting Ships

- USS Begor (DE-711)
- USS J. Douglas Blackwood (DE-219)
- USS Boone (FFG-28)
- USS Bronstein (DE-189)
- USS Bronstein (DE-1037)
- USS Gendreau (DE-639)
- USS Grayson (DD-435)
- USS Heermann (DD-532)
- USS Kane (DD-235)
- USS Kane (AGS-27)
- USS Longshaw (DD-559)
- USS Samuel S. Miles (DE-183)
- USS Pinkney (APH-2)
- USS Pratt (DE-363)
- USS Rall (DE-304)
- USS Ringness (DE-590)
- USS Rixey (APH-3)
- USS Tryon (APH-1)
- USS William M. Wood (DD-715)
- USS Wood (DD-317)
- USNS Charles Drew (T-AKE-10)

== Historic officer ranks ==
| Medical Corps, Navy (1871-1947) | Line ranks, Navy |
|---|---|
| Surgeon of the Fleet / Fleet-Surgeon | Commodore |
| Medical Director | Captain |
| Medical Inspector | Commander |
| Surgeon | Lieutenant-Commander |
| Surgeon | Lieutenant |
| Passed Assistant Surgeon | Lieutenant |
| Passed Assistant Surgeon | Master / Lieutenant (junior grade) (from March 1883) |
| Assistant Surgeon | Master |
| Assistant Surgeon | Ensign |

== See also ==
- United States Army Medical Corps
