= Navy Enlisted Classification =

Classification system of the US Navy

The Navy Enlisted Classification (NEC) system supplements the rating designators for enlisted members of the United States Navy. A naval rating and NEC designator are similar to the military occupational specialty (MOS) designators used in the U.S. Army and U.S. Marine Corps and the Air Force Specialty Code (AFSC) used in the U.S. Air Force and the U.S. Space Force.

The U.S. Navy has several ratings or job specialties for its enlisted members. An enlisted member is known by the enlisted rating, for example a Machinist's Mate (MM), or by the enlisted rate, for example Petty Officer First Class (PO1). Often Navy enlisted members are addressed by a combination of rating and rate; in this example, this Machinist's Mate Petty Officer First Class may be addressed as Machinist's Mate 1st Class (MM1).

However, the NEC designator is a four-digit code that identifies skills and abilities beyond the standard (or outward) rating designator. According to Military Personnel Manual (MILSPERMAN) 1221-010, the NEC designator facilitates personnel planning, procurement, and selection for training; development of training requirements; promotion, distribution, assignment and the orderly call to active duty of inactive duty personnel in times of national emergency or mobilization.

For example, a person holding the NEC "MM-3385" is a nuclear-trained Machinist's Mate for surface ships, and a person with the NEC "MM-3355" is a nuclear-trained Machinist's Mate for submarines.

For the U.S. Navy's officer ranks, the Naval Officer Designator serves a similar purpose.

== 01 - Deck Department ==
0160 - Causeway barge ferry pilot PO2-MCPO

0161 - YTB/YT tugmaster PO1-MCPO

0164 - Patrol boat coxswain SN-PO1

0167 - LCAC operator CPO-MCPO

0169 - Causeway barge ferry coxswain PO3-PO1

0170 - Surface rescue swimmer SN-MCPO

0171 - Landing craft utility craftmaster PO1-MCPO

0172 - LCAC loadmaster SN-PO1

0181 - Navy lighterage deck supervisor PO3-PO1

0190 - Force protection boat coxswain PO3-PO1

0199 - Boatswain's mate basic

== 02 - Navigation Department ==
0202 - Assistant navigator PO1-MCPO

0215 - Harbor/docking pilot PO1-MCPO

0299 - Quartermaster basic

== 03 - Operations Department ==
0302 - AN/SYS-2 integrated automatic detection and tracking (IADT) systems operator SN-CPO

0304 - LCAC radar operator/navigator PO2-CPO

0318 - Air intercept controller PO2-PO1

0319 - Supervisory air intercept controller PO1-MCPO

0324 - ASW/SUW tactical air controller (ASTAC) PO2-MCPO

0327 - Sea combat air controller (SCAC) SN-CPO

0328 - ASW/ASUW tactical air control (ASTAC) leadership CPO-MCPO

0334 - HARPOON (AN/SWG-1A) engagement planning operator PO3-MCPO

0336 - Tactical/mobile (TacMobile) operations control (OPCON) operator SN-CPO

0340 - Global command and control system common operational picture/maritime 4.X (GCCS COP/M 4.X) operator SN-MCPO

0342 - Global command and control system common operational picture/maritime (GCCS COP/M) operator SN-MCPO

0345 - Joint tactical ground station (JTAGS)/multi-mission mobile processor (M3P) system operator/maintainer PO3-CPO

0346 - AEGIS console operator track 3 SN-MCPo

0347 - Ship self defense system (SSDS) MK1 operator SN-PO1

0348 - Multi-tactical digital information link operator (TADIL) PO3-MCPO

0349 - SSDS MK 2 advanced operator SN-CPO

0350 - Interface control officer (ICO) PO1-MCPO

0356 - Global command and control system-maritime (4.1) increment 2 (GCCS-M 4.1 Inc 2) operator SR-MCPO

0399 - Operations specialist basic

1523 - AN/SPN-35 amphibious air traffic control radar technician

== 04 - Sonar Technician (surface/subsurface) ==
0402 - AN/SQQ-89(V)2/9 active sonar level II technician/operator petty officer - chief

0410 - AN/SLQ-48(V) mine neutralization systems (MNS) operator/maintenance technician SN-MCPO

0411 - AN/SQQ-89(V)4/6 sonar subsystem level I operator SN-PO1

0414 - AN/SQQ-89(V)3/5 active sonar level II technician/operator PO3-SCPO

0415 - AN/SQQ-89(V) 2/3/4/6/7/8/9/12 passive sonar level II technician/operator PO3-SCPO

0416 - Acoustic intelligence specialist PO1-MCPO

0417 - ASW specialist CPO-MCPO

0425 - AN/BQQ-6 Trident level III master operation and maintenance technician PO2-MCPO

0430 - Underwater fire control system MK-116 MOD 7 anti-submarine warfare control system operator PO2-MCPO

0450 - Journeyman level acoustic analyst PO2-MCPO

0455 - AN/SQQ-89(V) 4/6 active sonar level II technician PO3-SCPO

0461 - AN/BSY-2(V) advanced maintainer PO3-MCPO

0466 - Journeyman surface ship USW supervisor PO2-SCPO

0501 - Sonar (submarines) leading chief petty officer PO1-MCPO

0505 - Integrated undersea surveillance system (IUSS) analyst SN-SCPO

0506 - Integrated undersea surveillance system (IUSS) maintenance technician SN-SCPO

0507 - Integrated undersea surveillance system (IUSS) master analyst PO2-SCPO

0509 - AN/SQQ-89 (V) adjunct subsystem level II technician PO3-SCPO

0510 - AN/SQS-53D sensor subsystem level II technician/operator SSN-CPO

0511 - AN/SQQ-89(V) 11/12 sonar subsystem level I operator SN-PO1

0512 - AN/BSY-1 and AN/BQQ-5E combined retained equipment maintenance technician PO3-SCPO

0518 - Sonar technician AN/BQQ-10(V) operator/maintainer PO3-SCPO

0520 - Sonar, combat control and architecture equipment technician PO2-SCPO

0521 - AN/SQQ-89(V)15 sonar system level I operator SN-PO1

0522 - AN/SQQ-89(V)15 sonar system level II technician PO3-MCPO

0523 - AN/SQQ-89(V)15 sonar system journeyman PO2-SCPO

0524 - AN/SQQ-89A(V)15/(V)15 EC204 surface ship USW combat systems senor operator SN-PO1

0525 - AN/SQQ-89A(V)15 surface ship USW combat systems maintenance technician PO3-SCPO

0527 - AN/SQQ-89A(V)15/(V)15 EC204 surface ship USW combat systems journeyman PO2-CPO

0530 - AN/BQQ-10(V) TI-10/12 operator/maintainer PO3-SCPO

0540 - AN/SQQ-34C (V) 2 aircraft carrier tactical support center (CV-TSC) operator PO3-SCPO

0541 - AN/SQQ-34C (V) 2 aircraft carrier tactical support center (CV-TSC) maintenance technicians PO3-PO1

0550 - Integrated undersea surveillance system (IUSS) passive sensor operator (PSO) SN-SCPO

0551 - Integrated undersea surveillance system (IUSS) supervisor PO2-SCPO

0552 - Integrated undersea surveillance system (IUSS) low frequency active (LFA)/compact low frequency active (CLFA) operator SN-SCPO

0553 - Integrated undersea surveillance system (IUSS) SURTASS mission commander CPO-MCPO

== 08 - Weapons department ==
0746 - Advanced undersea MK-46 maintenance weapons smith (SN-SCPO)

0812 - Small arms marksmanship instructor (PO2-MCPO)

0814 - Crew served weapons (CSW) instructor (PO2-MCPO)

0857 - 25 mm machine gun system (MGS) MK 38 MOD gun weapon system (GWS) technician (SN-PO1)

0870 - MK 46 MOD 2 gun weapon system (GWS) technician (SN-SCPO)

0878 - MK-75 operator/maintainer (SN-CPO)

0879 - 5"/54 caliber gun system MK-45 MOD 1 and 2 operator/maintainer (SN-SCPO)

0880 - 5"/62 caliber MK 45 MOD 4 gun mount maintenance (SN-SCPO)

0979 - MK-41 VLS baseline IV through VII technician (SN-MCPO)

0981 - MK-41 VLS maintainer technician (SN-MCPO)
