= Restricted line officer =

Officer designator in US Navy

A restricted line officer is a designator given to a United States Navy and Navy Reserve line officer who is not eligible for Command at Sea. There are many different types and communities, including Engineering Duty Officers, Aerospace Engineering Duty Officers, Aerospace Maintenance Duty Officers, Naval Intelligence Officers, Cryptologic Warfare Officers, Information Operations Officers, Foreign Area Officers, Public Affairs Officers, Naval Oceanographers, Information Professionals, and Human Resources.

== Engineering Duty Officers ==
EDOs apply technical expertise, practical engineering judgment, and business acumen to the research, development, design, acquisition, construction, life cycle maintenance, modernization, and disposal of ships and submarines and their associated warfare support systems. EDOs work in Fleet Maintenance & Industrial Management (50%), Acquisition (20%), and Systems Engineering (30%).

== Aerospace Engineering Duty Officers ==
AEDOs provide professional management and technical direction in the entire air weapon system acquisition process from design to production and later product improvements of Naval aircraft and weapons. Over one-third of AEDO billets are flying billets. AEDOs test and evaluate new aircraft, weapons systems, and weapons in various stages of development. Throughout a career, the AEDO will have billets primarily in NAVAIR in: (1) operational support activities; (2) headquarters; (3) research, development, test, and evaluation; and (4) manufacturing and production. All active duty AEDOs and most Navy Reserve AEDOs are accessed from the Unrestricted Line and have previously qualified and been designated as Naval Aviators or Naval Flight Officers.

== Aerospace Maintenance Duty Officers ==
AMDOs provide full-time direction in the development, establishment, and implementation of maintenance and material management policies and procedures for the support of naval aircraft, airborne weapons, attendant systems and related support equipment. The community includes approximately 500 officers. In addition to working in fleet maintenance organizations throughout the fleet, AMDOs are involved in all aspects of material acquisition and support as top-level Program Managers in NAVAIR and as Commanding Officers of the Naval Aviation Depots. AMDOs and AEDOs are combined into a new, single competitive category at the Captain level.

== Naval Intelligence ==
Naval Intelligence provides tactical, operational and strategic intelligence support to U.S. naval forces, joint services, multi-national forces, and executive level decision-makers. Naval Intelligence Officers have a wide variety of technical and non-technical academic backgrounds, including political science, modern history, physical and natural sciences, and the liberal arts (which include languages and linguistics). There are approximately 1,350 Naval Intelligence Officers.

== Cryptologic Warfare ==
Formerly known as Naval Information Warfare Officers, there are over 800 Navy Cryptologic Warfare officers, who perform Naval Information Operations functions as directed by the Chief of Naval Operations afloat and ashore, and National Signals Intelligence tasks assigned by the Director, National Security Agency at NSA facilities ashore. These functions include: -Information Operations (IO, composed of Electronic Warfare-EW, Operational Security-OPSEC, Military Deception-MILDEC, Computer Network Operations-CNO, and Psychological Operations-PSYOP) support on board ships, submarines and aircraft and ashore -Signals Intelligence/EW tasks assigned under CNO authority (generally afloat) and DIRNSA (ashore) -Information Operations to maximize friendly use of the electromagnetic spectrum and to minimize adversary IO efforts

== Foreign Area Officers ==
The Navy Foreign Area Officer (FAO) Community is a stand-alone Restricted Line Community offering world-wide assignment opportunities to qualified Naval Officers.

Naval Officers selected for FAO are assigned a region of specialization, provided language and graduate education on an as-required basis, and detailed to FAO-coded billets in accordance with the Navy FAO career path.

Navy FAOs maintain a broad range of military skills and experiences: knowledge of political-military affairs; familiarity with the political, cultural, social, economic, and geographic factors of the countries and regions in which they are stationed; and proficiency in one or more of the dominant languages in their regions of expertise.

Navy FAOs can expect to serve on staffs of Fleets, Combatant Commands, Defense Agencies, and DoD military-diplomatic offices at U.S. Embassies. They provide expertise in planning and executing operations, provide liaison with foreign militaries operating in coalitions with U.S. forces, conduct political-military activities, and execute military-diplomatic missions.

== Public Affairs Officers ==
The Public Affairs community is responsible for "Telling the Navy Story." Navy Public Affairs comprises three functional areas:

=== Media Operations ===
PAOs work with media outlets to communicate with the American public.

=== Internal Communications ===
PAOs produce publications, briefings and video news programs to communicate with Sailors, their families, reservists, retirees and civilian employees.

=== Community relations ===
PAOs reach out to the American public through "hands-on" programs like public tours, Congressional and VIP visits and embarks, speaking engagements, open houses and special events.

PAOs serve at sea, ashore, and in joint assignments, and are always deployed where Navy news is being made. All active duty PAOs join the community through lateral transfer from the Unrestricted Line while the Navy Reserve has a limited number of direct annual accessions into the PAO designator through a Direct Commission Officer (DCO) program. Today there are about 240 officers in this community, the smallest in the Restricted Line.

== Naval Oceanographers ==
The Naval Oceanography community collects, analyzes, and then distributes data about the ocean and the atmosphere to Navy forces operating globally. Naval oceanographers are first on the scene - either literally in survey ships, or figuratively through computer prediction programs - in any military operation. There are approximately 430 Oceanography officers. They assist the war fighter in taking tactical advantage of the environment. They support the operational fleet from a variety of platforms. This can range from local area weather forecasting in support of aircraft carrier operations to optimizing the use of a sonar system in accordance with prevailing underwater sound conditions.

== Information Professionals ==
The Information Professional Community is responsible for offensive and defensive Navy information operations to support requirements of theatre and operational commanders and national policy makers. They provide expertise in information, command and control, and space systems through the planning, acquisition, operation, maintenance, and security of systems that support Navy operational and business processes. Presently, there are billets for 535 officers.

== Human resources ==
The Human Resources community plans, programs, and executes life-cycle management of the navy's most important resource – its people. The primary focus will be on the human resources system: the combined elements of manpower, personnel, training, and recruiting. There are billets for 570 officers in this community, under the direction of the Chief of Naval Personnel.

== See also ==
- List of Naval Officer Designators
