= Naval Aviation Supply Corps insignia =

Military badge of the United States Navy

The Naval Aviation Supply Corps insignia is a military badge of the United States Navy which is awarded to Naval Aviation Supply Officers (NASOs) of the Navy Supply Corps who have qualified for duties as a Supply Officer in support of naval aviation and are also qualified to serve in duty assignments onboard aircraft carriers. The Aviation Supply Corps insignia is one of four warfare badges issued to Supply Corps officers by the U.S. Navy. The others are the Navy Expeditionary Supply Corps Officer Badge, Surface Warfare Supply Badge, and the Submarine Supply Corps Badge.

To be issued the insignia, a service member must complete a standard qualification program which includes supply procedures of a naval aviation unit, qualifications in certain aviation related watch stations, as well as an abbreviated amount of aviation knowledge which would normally be required for flight deck personnel.

Junior supply officers, assigned to aircraft carriers, Naval Air Stations or aviation squadrons, are granted between 18–24 months to qualify for the Aviation Supply Corps insignia. Reserve officers may take up to 36 months to qualify for their insignia, if assigned to a qualifying billet.

The Aviation Supply Corps insignia appears as a Naval Aviator Badge, in the center of which is positioned the Navy Supply Corps three oak leaf emblem. The insignia is also only authorized for officers, while enlisted supply personnel (such as those in the rate Logistics Specialist) are eligible to receive the Enlisted Aviation Warfare Specialist Badge.

== See also ==
- List of United States Navy enlisted warfare designations
- Badges of the United States Navy
- Military badges of the United States
- Obsolete badges of the United States military
- Uniforms of the United States Navy
