= Navy Supply Corps =

Logistics-focused staff corps of the United States Navy

U.S. Navy Supply Corps
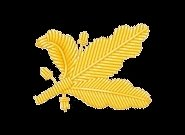
- Supply Corps "Oakleaf" insignia
- Active: 23 February 1795 – present
- Country: United States of America
- Allegiance: (United States) U.S.
- Branch: U.S. Navy (Active & Reserve Component)
- Type: Staff Corps
- Role: Sustain U.S. Navy and U.S. Military Operations worldwide
- Size: ~2200 Supply Officers (May 2018)
- Part of: Naval Supply Systems Command
- Nicknames: Suppo, Chop
- Motto: "Ready for Sea"
- Anniversaries: 23 February
- Engagements: Every U.S. engagement since the 1798 Quasi-War

Commanders
- Current commander: RADM Kenneth Epps, SC, USN; Chief of Supply Corps

The Navy Supply Corps is the United States Navy staff corps concerned with supply, logistics, combat support, readiness, contracting, and fiscal matters.

== Duties ==
Commissioned officers in the Supply Corps practice a variety of disciplines, including supply management, expeditionary logistics, inventory control, disbursement, financial management, contracting, information systems, operations analysis, material and operational logistics, fuels management, food service, and physical distribution.

Supply Corps officers are widely distributed throughout the Navy and Department of Defense; they are typically billeted to an operational command (sub, ship, EODMU, Seal Team, NMCB/ACB, etc) or shore activity's supply department, or to a supply unit or command, such as Navy Expeditionary Logistics Support Groups (NAVELSG), Fleet Logistics Centers (FLCs) or Navy Special Warfare (SPECWAR) Logistics Groups which support the United States Navy SEALs.

Ratings that compose the U.S. Navy enlisted Supply community are:

- Logistics Specialist (LS) – assist in managing inventories and ordering of parts and supplies, financial management, contracting, and mail
- Culinary Specialist (CS) – manage and execute all food-service operations
- Retail Services Specialist (RS) – assist in managing shipboard retail and service activities
- Personnel specialist (PS) - manage disbursing and pay

== History ==
=== Pursers ===
Purser Samuel Hambleton designed and procured Oliver Hazard Perry's iconic Lake Erie battle flag

The Supply Corps emerged from the traditions of ashore naval logistics and the shipboard position of Purser, which had been in use with the Royal Navy since the 14th Century. The ship's Purser was primarily responsible for the handling of money and the procurement and keeping of stores and supplies.

The Supply Corps considers as its birthday 23 February 1795, when the nation's first Purveyor of Public Supplies, Tench Francis Jr., was appointed by President George Washington.

American Pursers served with distinction from the earliest days; Samuel Hambleton was a purser officer serving on Oliver Hazard Perry's flagship, the USS Lawrence, during the Battle of Lake Erie, when he volunteered to work a gun and aided in the Americans' eventual victory. Hambleton was severely wounded by a cannonball that fell onto him from the rigging of the ship.

Unlike their line counterparts, pursers originally did not hold rank. An 1854 Act of Congress legalized the relative rank conferred upon pursers by General Order of 27 May 1847. Pursers with more than twelve years' service ranked with commanders and those with less than twelve years ranked with lieutenants.

=== Pay Corps ===
In 1860, the name of the position of Purser was changed to "Paymaster". Ashore naval logistics, which had been the purview of civilians, were transferred to Paymasters throughout the 1860s.

=== Supply Corps ===
By Act of 11 July 1919 the designation of the Pay Corps was changed to Supply Corps.

Recent developments have mirrored those in the private sector logistics, with an increasing scientific and quantitative emphasis and reliance on networked computing power.

== Traditions ==
=== The Oakleaf ===
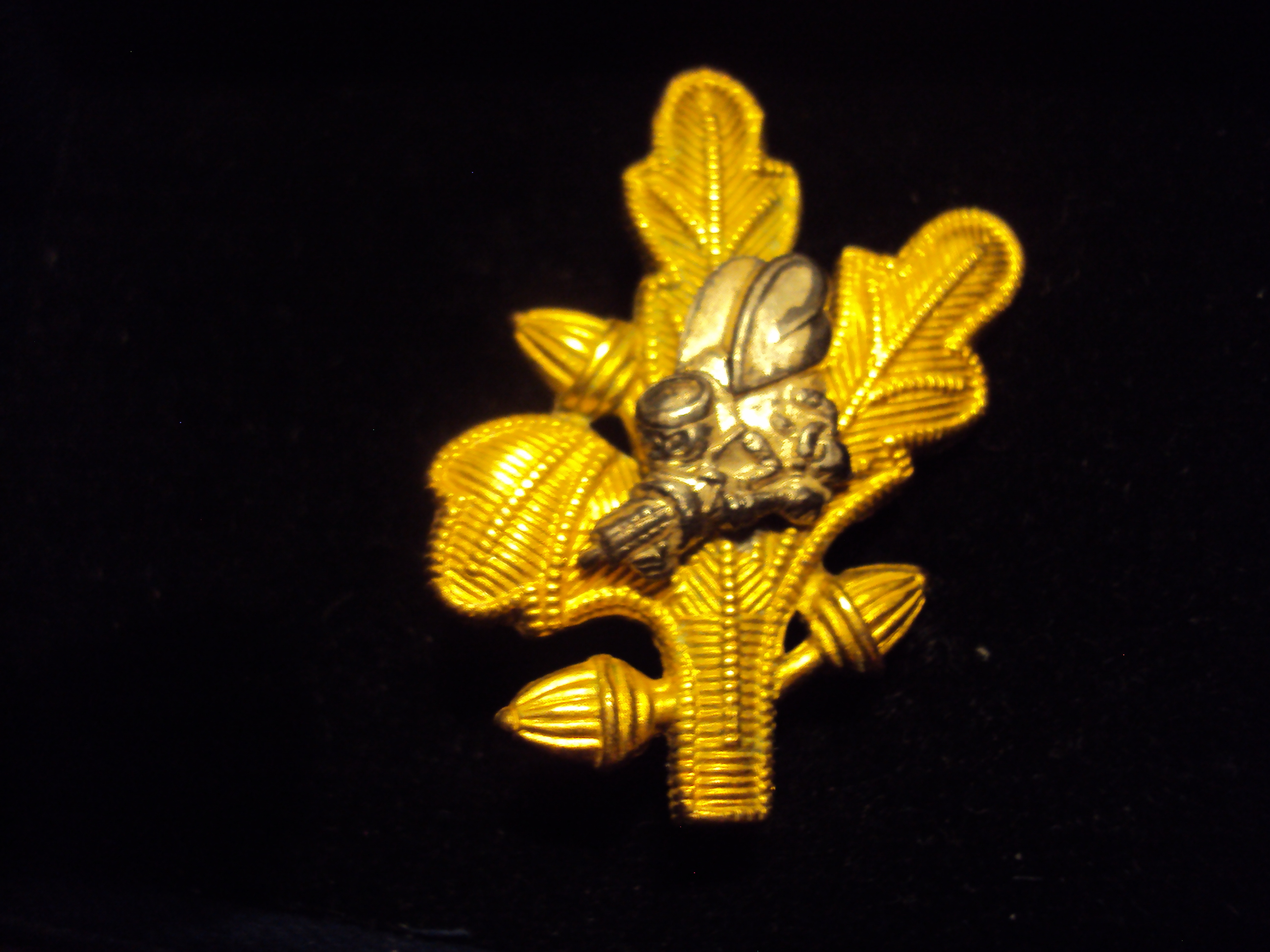
WWII Naval Officers from the Civil Engineer Corps, Medical Corps, Dental Corps and Supply Corps assigned to Naval Construction Battalions had a Silver Seabee on their Corps insignia.

Originally, staff officers were distinguished from line officers only by the details of their uniforms, such as number of buttons on lapels, cuffs and pockets, epaulets, color, cut of coat, or amount of gold lace.

Uniform regulations issued 1 May 1830 specified that a Purser should have, in addition to the live oak leaf and acorn (which appeared on the collars of all officers in varying abundance) a cornucopia embroidered on the collar of his full dress coat. In 1841 the distinguishing mark on the Purser's collar was changed to a 4" row of gold embroidered oak leaves and acorns.

A modification of the uniform regulations, dated 27 May 1847, provided gold epaulets for the Purser on which was a solid crescent with the Old English letters "P.D." in silver within the crescent. In September 1852 the letters "P.D." were abolished.

By General Order of 23 August 1856, Pursers were required to wear the uniform of their relative rank with the exception of the lace on the pantaloons; their corps device on epaulets, shoulder straps and cap remaining the same. As late as 1862 uniform regulations did not distinguish among the different staff corps. In January 1864 the various corps were again assigned distinguishing marks, with the Pay Corps insignia being a silver oak sprig worn on the shoulder straps and in the wreath of the cap.

In regulations of 1905, while the insignia of the Pay Corps remained "a silver oak sprig", the pattern was a little different. Instead of the three leaves and two acorns standing out separately from the stem as heretofore, the three leaves and three acorns (one acorn having been added) were brought together at the stem of the sprig inscribed in a rectangle.

The last significant change to the Supply Corps insignia came in 1919; the leaf retained its shape, but was to be embroidered in gold instead of silver.

=== Ready for Sea ===
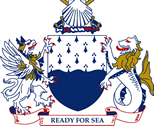
Supply Corps crest

The official motto of the Supply Corps is "Ready for Sea" – reflecting the Supply Corps' longstanding role in sustaining warfighting. This motto derives from the traditional report from each Department Head of a ship to the Captain prior to an underway: the traditional form is "Good Morning, Captain, The Supply Department is ready for sea in all respects."

=== Pork Chop ===
Supply Corps officers are often called "Pork Chop" within the wardroom, a reference to the Supply Corps oak leaf insignia's superficial resemblance to a pork chop. Supply Corps officers assigned to submarine duty are known simply as "Chop" for the same reason. Supply Corps officers are sometimes colloquially called "SuppO," although this term is technically reserved for the Department Head, who is nearly always the senior Supply Corps officer at a command. On small ships where two Supply Corps officers are posted, the junior officer ("ASuppO) is often called "Lamb Chop".

== Career progression ==
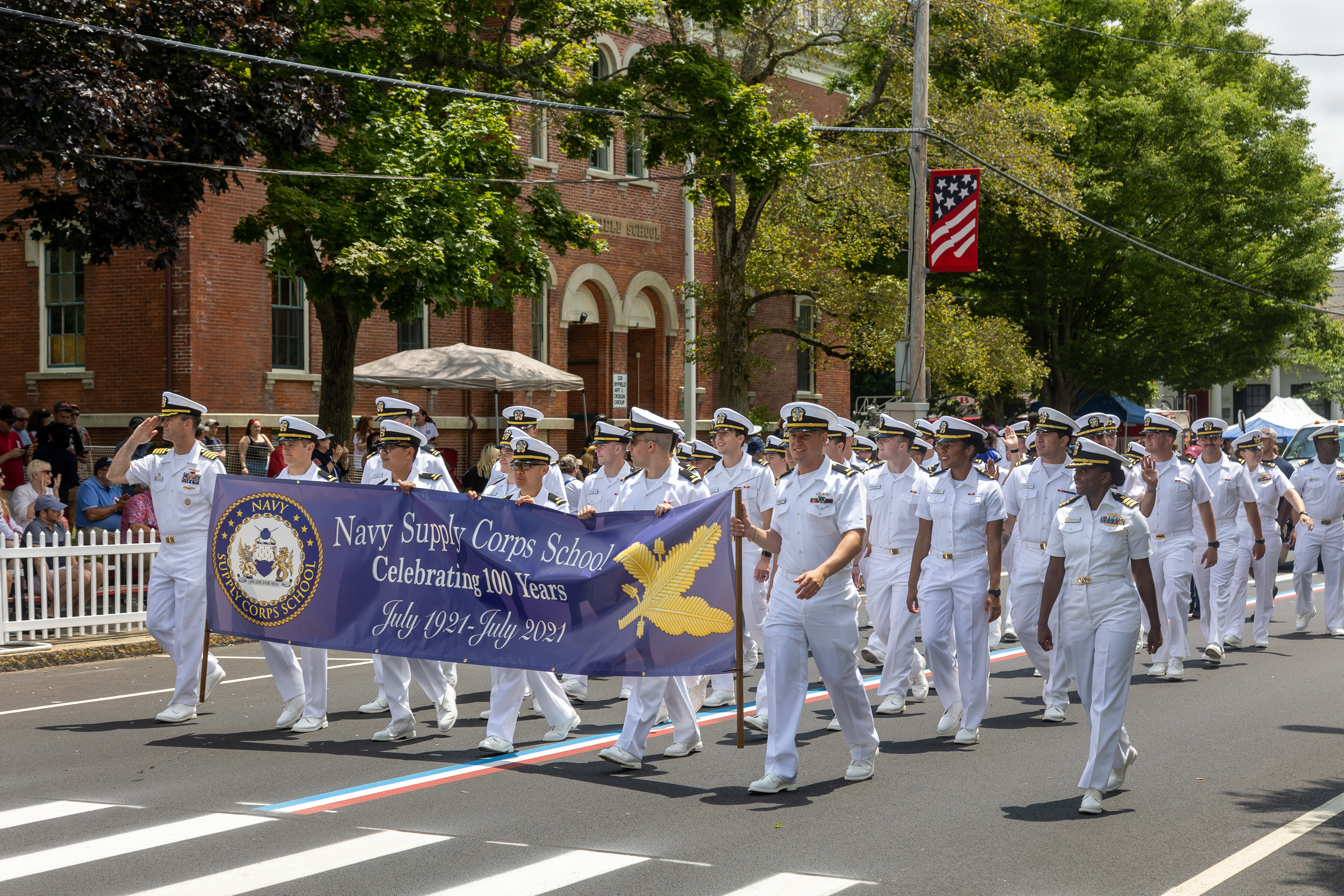
Navy Supply Corps School sailors in the Bristol Fourth of July Parade

New Supply Corps junior officers attend the Navy Supply Corps School (NSCS) in Newport, Rhode Island.

Current Navy policy dictates that Supply Officers complete two operational tours and obtain a warfare pin for consideration for Lieutenant Commander (O-4) boards.

Supply Corps officers are eligible for command of supply units (e.g. a Supply Corps officer is always in command of Naval Cargo Handling Battalions). In addition to shipboard billets, Supply Corps officers also serve in forward deployed land-based units (e.g. with Construction Battalions working alongside Civil Engineer Corps officers and with the Marine Corps).

Three stars (Vice-Admiral) is the highest rank a Supply Corps officer can attain. Twenty-one Supply Corps Officers have advanced to that rank: William J. Carter, E. G. Morsell, Edwin Dorsey Foster, Charles W. Fox, Murrey L. Royar, A. A. Antrim, Stephen R. Edson, Robert F. Batchelder, Joseph M. Lyle, Kenneth R. Wheeler, George E. Moore II, Vincent A. Lascara, Eugene A. Grinstead, Edward "Fast Eddie" M. Straw, Keith W. Lippert, Justin D. McCarthy, Alan S. Thompson, Mark Harnitchek, William "Andy" Brown, Michelle C. Skubic and Dion D. English.

== Notable Supply Corps servicemembers ==
- John Bello – founder and CEO SoBe Beverages; President, National Football League Properties 1986–93
- Norman Cahners – business publisher and inventor of the four-way pallet
- Eddie Carlson; CEO, United Airlines
- Andrew Clyde; U.S. representative from Georgia's 9th congressional district (2021-present)
- John Whitehead; Chairman, Goldman Sachs
- Benjamin Edwards – President, Chairman, CEO, A.G. Edwards, Inc.
- Roger Enrico – CEO, PepsiCo
- A.G. Lafley – CEO, Procter & Gamble
- Bruce Laingen – U.S. Ambassador to Malta
- Melvin R. Laird – Secretary of Defense, 1969–1973
- Leonard Lauder – CEO, Estée Lauder
- Bill Marriott – CEO, Marriott Hotels
- James J. Mulva; former Chairman, President, CEO of ConocoPhillips
- Regis Philbin – television personality
- John N. Raudabaugh - Member, U.S. National Labor Relations Board, 1990-1993
- Roger Staubach – NFL quarterback
- Gary Peters - U.S. Senator from Michigan
- Jim Banks - U.S. Senator from Indiana

== See also ==
- Purser
- Naval Supply Systems Command (NAVSUP)
- Navy Supply Corps School
- Surface Warfare Supply Corps Officer (SWSCO) pin
- Naval Aviation Supply Officer (NASO) pin
- Submarine Supply Officer pin
- Navy Expeditionary Supply Corps Officer (NESCO) pin
- Seabee Combat Warfare Officer pin
- Navy Cargo Handling Battalion (NCHB)
- Military logistics
