= Naval Flight Officer insignia =

Breast insignia

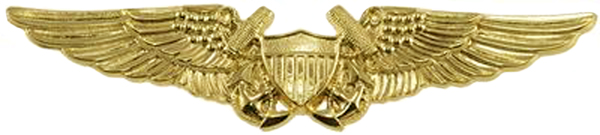
Naval Flight Officer insignia

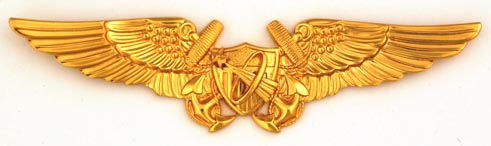
Naval Flight Officer Astronaut insignia

The Naval Flight Officer insignia is a breast insignia of the United States military which is awarded to those aviators of the Navy, Marine Corps and Coast Guard who have qualified as Naval Flight Officers (NFO) based on successful completion of flight training. The insignia is similar in design to the Naval Aviator insignia, consisting of a pair of golden wings, a shield, and crossed anchors.

The Naval Flight Officer insignia is identical for all three branches and is awarded in a single degree. To qualify for the NFO insignia, a service member must have completed officer aviation training and be qualified as a systems operator on board a Naval aircraft. Such qualifications include weapons system operations, airborne tactical data system operations, electronic warfare, and airborne navigation.

The insignia originated in the 1930s and evolved from the Naval Aviation Observer insignia. The main reason for creating the NFO insignia in 1965-1966 was to recognize the higher degree of training required for naval flight officers, compared to other airborne support personnel.

In the modern space age, the insignia is also upgradeable to a variation of the Naval Aviator Astronaut insignia. Known as the Naval Flight Officer Astronaut insignia, the decoration is a standard NFO insignia upon which is centered a golden astronaut "shooting star" logo. The badge is issued for those Naval Flight Officers who have completed astronaut training at NASA and have subsequently participated in a space flight more than 50 miles above the Earth.

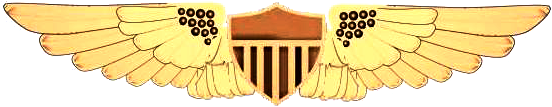
Drawing of the Coast Guard Flight Officer insignia

The United States Coast Guard previously awarded an equivalent of the Naval Flight Officer insignia known as the Coast Guard Flight Officer Badge. It was awarded between 1987 and 1991, when the service operated the E-2C Hawkeye. The badge was identical to Naval Flight Officer wings, however modern Coast Guard Uniform regulations depict the obsolete badge with the crossed anchors deleted.

== See also ==
- List of United States Navy enlisted warfare designations
- Badges of the United States Navy
- Military badges of the United States
- Obsolete badges of the United States military
- Uniforms of the United States Navy
