= SSBN Deterrent Patrol insignia =

US Navy uniform badge

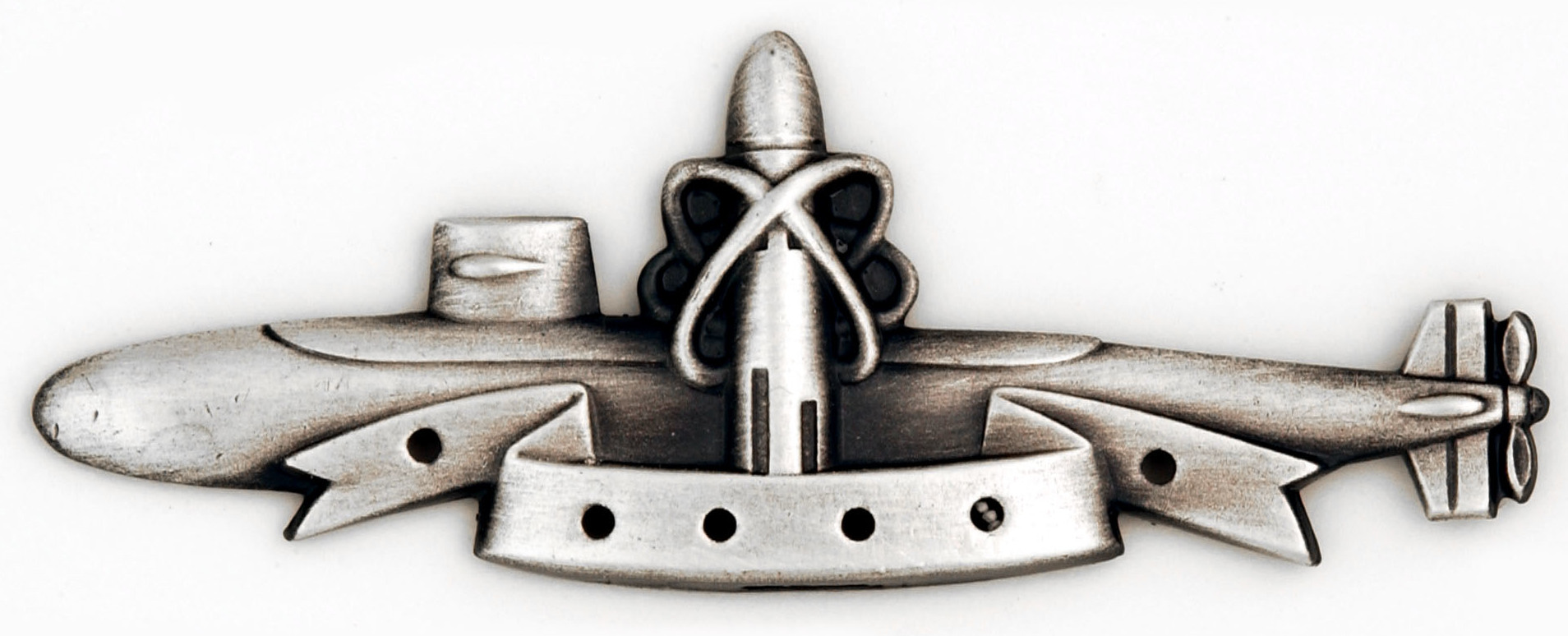

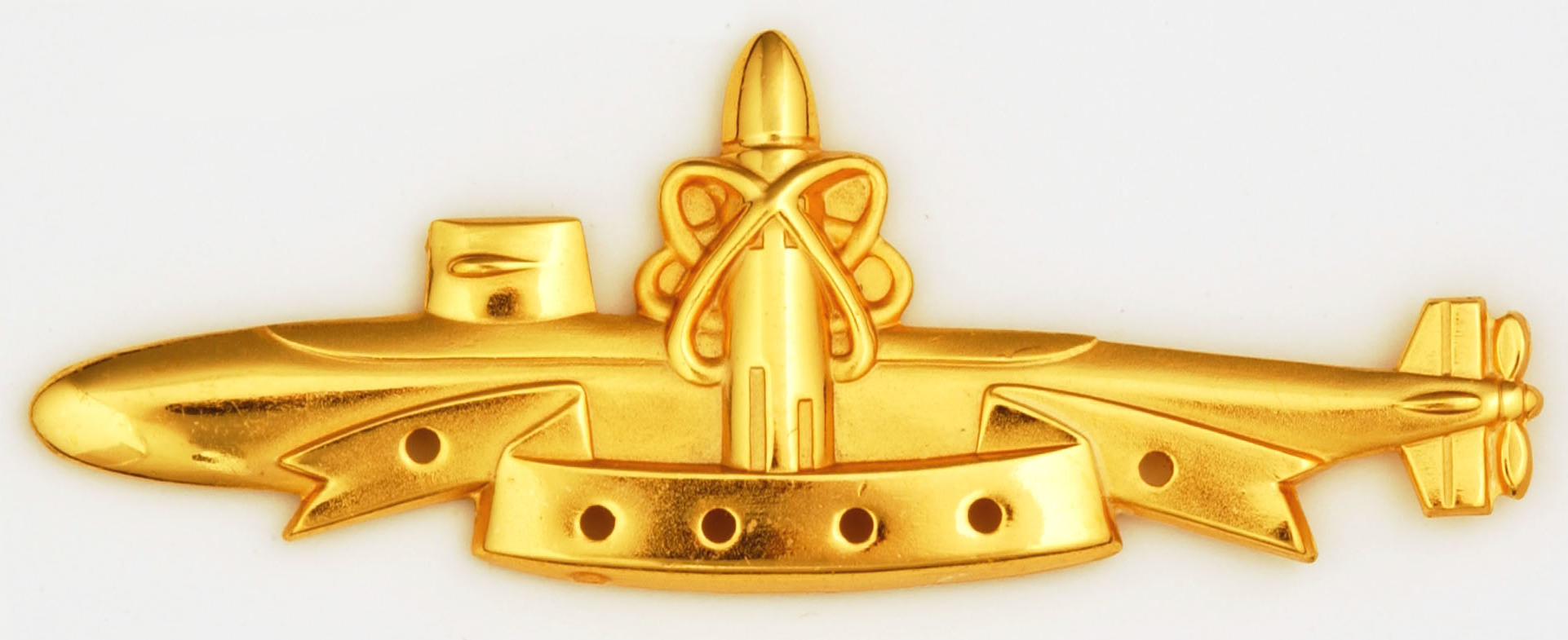
SSBN Deterrent Patrol Pin, in silver and gold, without service stars.

The SSBN Deterrent Patrol Insignia is a uniform breast pin worn by officers and enlisted sailors of the United States Navy's submarine service who have completed strategic deterrent patrols in nuclear ballistic or cruise missile submarines. It is awarded for different criteria than the Submarine Combat Patrol Insignia awarded for submarine patrols during World War II. Design of the SSBN pin shows a silver Lafayette-class submarine with superimposed Polaris missile and electron rings which signify the armament and nuclear-powered characteristics of the Fleet Ballistic Missile Deterrent Force. A scroll beneath the submarine holds up to six award stars, with one gold star authorized for each successful patrol, or a silver star for five successful patrols. At twenty (20) successful patrols, the SSBN pin is upgraded to a gold design. This insignia qualifies the veteran as a combat veteran, making the veteran eligible to join the VFW.

After the insignia was approved, awards were made retroactive to the first strategic deterrent patrol of USS George Washington (SSBN-598) which was completed on 21 January 1961. The strategic deterrent patrols of the five Regulus missile submarines were not initially deemed worthy of this insignia, but this decision was reversed in 2004.

The SSBN pin is worn on the left uniform pocket, typically below award ribbons. The badge is considered a "secondary insignia", meaning that the badge is worn secondary to a primary warfare pin, such as the Submarine Warfare insignia. Personnel eligible to wear other secondary submarine insignias, such as the Submarine Combat Patrol Insignia or the Deep Submergence Insignia, may only wear one such insignia at a time according to their personal desire. The badge does not need to be worn if the command does not require it.

== See also ==
- Submarine Warfare insignia
- List of United States Navy enlisted warfare designations
- Badges of the United States Navy
- Military badges of the United States
- Obsolete badges of the United States military
- Uniforms of the United States Navy
- Nuclear Deterrence Operations Service Medal
