= Submarine Combat Patrol insignia =

US Navy uniform badge

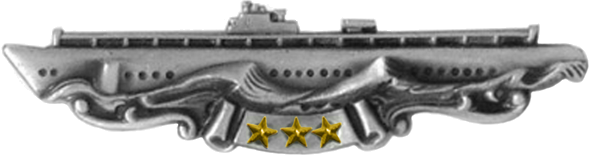
Submarine Combat Patrol insignia with 3 gold stars, denoting four successful patrols.

The Submarine Combat Patrol Insignia is a uniform breast pin worn by officers and men of the United States Navy's Submarine Service who have completed combat patrols during declared wars. Such patrols were last conducted during World War II. During and after the war several varieties were manufactured.

The pin shows the broadside of a Gato-class diesel submarine. A scroll beneath the submarine holds service stars, one gold star for each successful patrol after the first or a silver star for five successful patrols. Successful patrols were those so designated by fleet commanders.

The Submarine Combat Patrol Insignia is considered a "secondary insignia" and is typically worn in conjunction with a primary warfare badge, such as the Submarine Warfare Insignia. Personnel eligible to wear other secondary insignias, such as the SSBN Deterrent Patrol Insignia or the Deep Submergence Insignia, may only wear one insignia at a time according to their personal desire.

== See also ==
- List of United States Navy enlisted warfare designations
- Badges of the United States Navy
- Military badges of the United States
- Uniforms of the United States Navy
- United States Submarine Veterans of World War II
