= Badges of the United States Navy =

Military badges of the US Navy

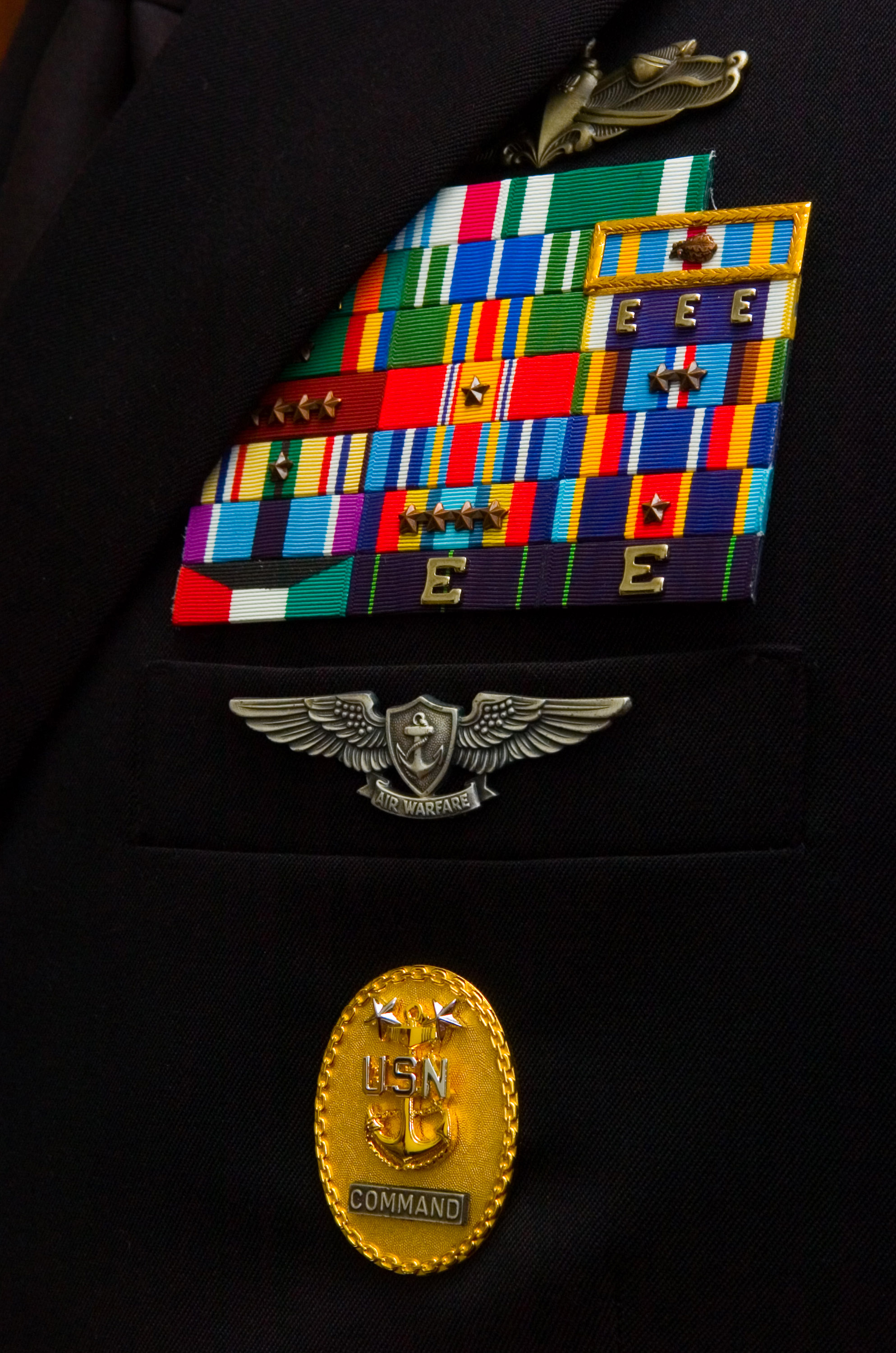
U.S. Navy ribbons, pin insignias, and badge worn on the uniform of a Command Master Chief.

Insignias and badges of the United States Navy are military badges issued by the United States Department of the Navy to naval service members who achieve certain qualifications and accomplishments while serving on both active and reserve duty in the United States Navy. Most naval aviation insignia are also permitted for wear on uniforms of the United States Marine Corps.

As described in Chapter 5 of U.S. Navy Uniform Regulations, badges are categorized as breast insignia (usually worn immediately above and below ribbons) and identification badges (usually worn at breast pocket level). Breast insignia are further divided between command and warfare and other qualification.

Insignia come in the form of metal pin-on devices worn on formal uniforms and embroidered tape strips worn on work uniforms. For the purpose of this article, the general term "insignia" shall be used to describe both, as it is done in Navy Uniform Regulations. The term "badge", although used ambiguously in other military branches and in informal speak to describe any pin, patch, or tab, is exclusive to identification badges and authorized marksmanship awards according to the language in Navy Uniform Regulations, Chapter 5.

The modern day United States Navy currently maintains the following breast insignia and badges:

== Breast insignia ==
=== Command ===
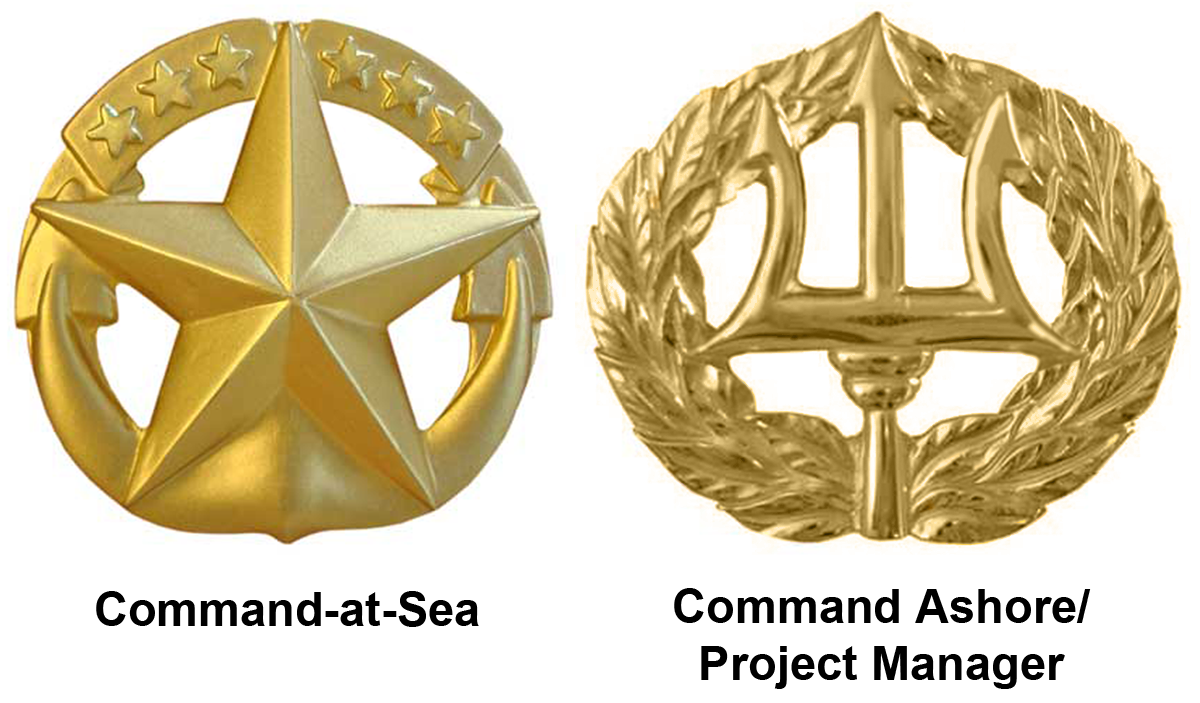
Command Insignia Badges

The Command at Sea insignia is for commissioned officers between the ranks of Lieutenant (O-3) and Admiral (O-10) who are in or have been in command of a ship or operational fleet air unit. The Command Ashore/Project Manager insignia is for officers who are or have been commanding officer of a naval installation, a shore-based command (to include non-deploying air commands), or in charge of a major program or project (the latter being primarily in the Naval Air Systems Command or Naval Sea Systems Command).

An incumbent officer wears insignia on the right breast; in full dress it is worn 1/4 inch (6.4 mm) above the nametag.

A post tour officer wears the insignia on the left breast 1/4 inch below the top of the pocket/flap. If a warfare or qualification insignia is already occupying that position, it is then worn 1/4 inch below that insignia, or on uniforms with pocket flaps, 1/4 inch below the flap. Women in full dress will wear post tour command insignia 1/4 inch above the left pocket, medals or primary breast insignia. Only one post tour command insignia may be worn.

=== Warfare and Other Qualification ===
Warfare and Other Qualification insignia are awarded for completing qualifications in various fields within the Navy. They are worn on the left side of the uniform in the primary position (for one insignia), or the primary and secondary position (for two insignia). Only two of this class of breast insignia may be worn at one time.

- The primary position is centered above ribbons or medals with the lower edge of the device 1/4 inch above the top row of ribbons or medals. When no ribbons or medals are worn, it is centered above the left pocket with the lower edge of the device 1/4 inch above the top of the pocket.
- The secondary position is centered 1/4 inch below the top of the pocket or pocket flap, when ribbons or no awards are worn. When medals are worn, centered below medals with the top of the device 1/4 inch below the lowest row of medals.

Warfare and Other Qualification insignia are either silver or gold. Gold insignia are worn by officers and silver insignia are worn by enlisted sailors with four exceptions. Gold insignia worn by enlisted sailors are the Naval Special Warfare Insignia, Naval Aircrew Warfare Specialist "wings", Naval Parachutist "wings" with the silver Basic Parachutist wings worn by both officers and enlisted sailors until the Naval Parachutist wings are earned, and the gold SSBN Deterrent Patrol insignia signifying twenty or more completed patrols with fewer than twenty patrols signified by silver insignia for both officers and enlisted sailors.

Warfare and Other Qualification insignia are grouped in the following categories (in alphabetical order):

Warfare Qualification	Other Qualification
1) Aviation Warfare Insignia	12) Engineering Duty Officer Insignia
2) Expeditionary Warfare Insignia	13) Integrated Undersea Surveillance System Insignia
3) Explosive Ordnance Disposal Warfare Insignia	14) Navy Security Force Insignia
4) Fleet Marine Force Insignia	15) Nuclear Weapons Security Insignia
5) Information Warfare Insignia	16) Parachutists Insignia
6) Seabee Combat Warfare Specialist Insignia	17) Small Craft Insignia/Craftmaster Insignia
7) Special Operations Warfare Insignia	18) Submarine Patrol Insignia
8) Special Warfare Insignia	19) Underwater Insignia
9) Strategic Sealift Officer Warfare Insignia
10) Submarine Warfare Insignia
11) Surface Warfare Insignia

"Warfare" insignia take precedence over "Other" insignia and are placed in the primary position. If two Warfare insignia are authorized for wear, insignia of the specialty in which currently serving will be worn in the primary position. Personnel with multiple qualifications may wear only two insignia. Since September 2009, personnel with multiple designators within a single community (for example, an aviation officer who has earned both Naval Aviator and Naval Flight Officer qualifications) may wear both insignia, with their current billet's insignia on top.

Listed below are all the Warfare and Other Qualification insignia within each category.

==== Warfare Qualifications ====
===== Aviation Warfare =====
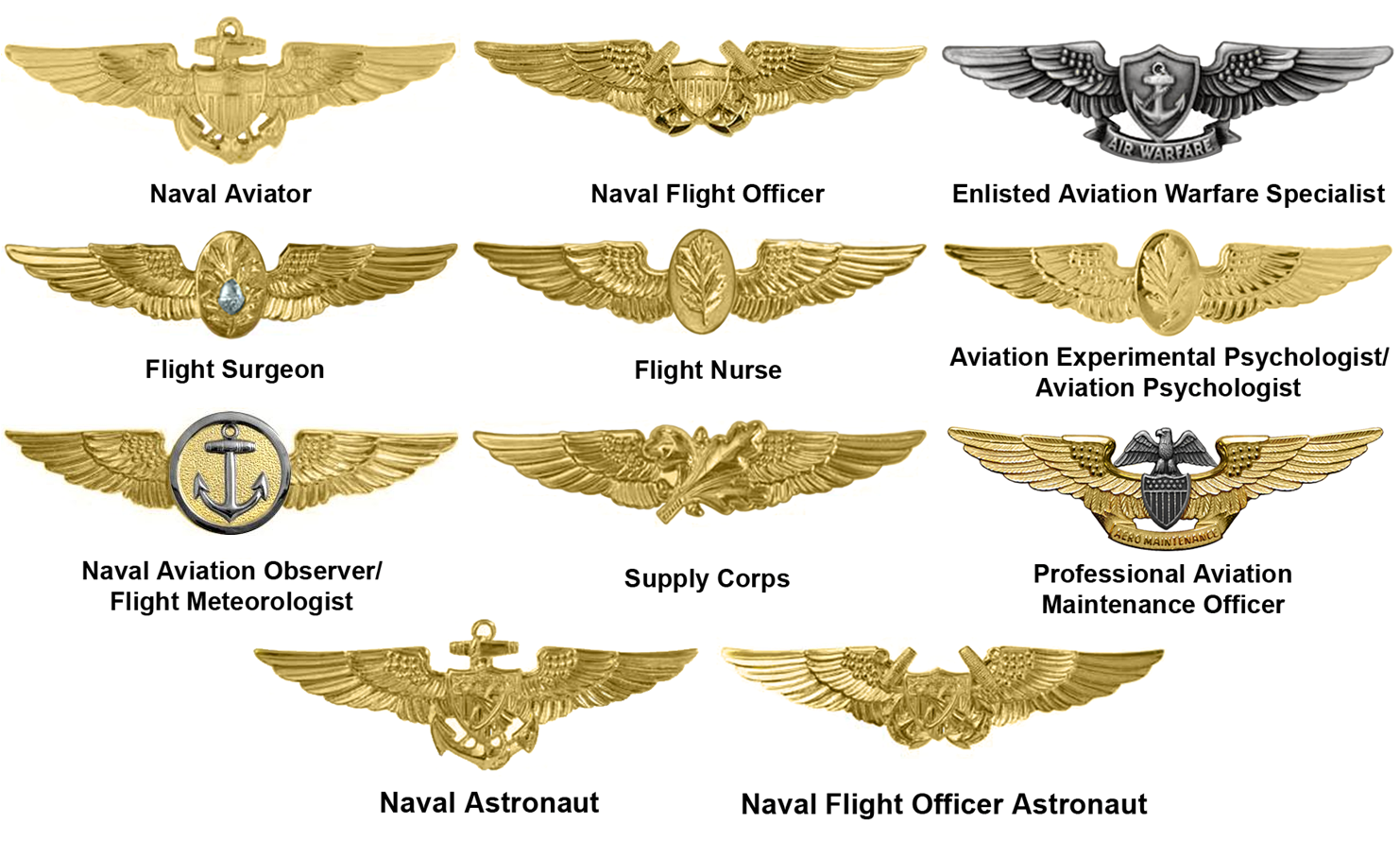
Aviation Warfare insignias

Aviation Warfare insignia (usually called "wings") are breast insignia of the aviation warfare community which are issued to those naval personnel who are trained and qualified to perform duties related to operation and support of naval aircraft.

There are two variants for line officers: Naval Aviator insignia for pilots, and Naval Flight Officer insignia for officers performing weapons systems officer, electronic countermeasures officer, navigator or similar functions. There is also an astronaut version of each of these insignia, known as the Naval Astronaut and Naval Astronaut (NFO), respectively.

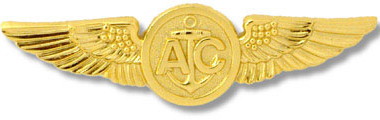
Naval Aircrew Warfare Specialist

In 2009 the Naval Aircrew insignia was converted from an "other qualification" to a warfare qualification like the Enlisted Aviation Warfare Specialist, Enlisted Submarine Warfare Specialist, and Enlisted Surface Warfare Specialist. The title was changed from Naval Aircrew (NAC) to Naval Aircrew Warfare Specialist (NAWS). (Note: MILPERSMAN 1220-020 Archived 17 October 2020 at the Wayback Machine) It is one of only four gold breast insignia awarded to qualified enlisted personnel. To qualify as a Naval Aircrew Warfare Specialist a sailor must be a qualified aircrew member; possess an eligible Navy enlisted classification (NEC) of 78XX, 82XX, 8401, or 94XX; and be assigned to flying duty in an eligible billet for his or her NEC. Candidates must complete a positional qualification for the respective aircraft within 18 months of reporting to a permanent duty station.

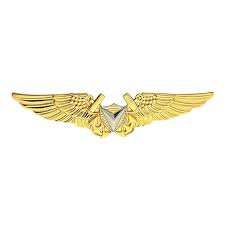
Air Vehicle Pilot (Note: This is the same badge worn by USMC Unmanned Aerial Systems Officers (UAVO) and by USCG Aerial Vehicle Pilots (AVP))

On 25 May 2023 the first Air Vehicle Pilot insighia were awarded to Warrant Officers qualified to pilot the Navy's unmanned aerial vehicles.

The Enlisted Aviation Warfare Specialist (EAWS) insignia is earned by sailors who demonstrate an in-depth knowledge of Naval Aviation. The EAWS designation may be earned by both enlisted Naval Aircrew and by non-flying enlisted Naval Aviation sailors (mainly maintenance personnel). EAWS status does not require any sort of actual flight experience or flight status in a flight crew capacity.

Other insignia for qualification in specialized areas exists for Flight Surgeons, Flight Nurses, Experimental Psychologists/Physiologists, Observers/Flight Meteorologists, and Supply Corps personnel. With the exception of the Naval Aviation Supply Corps insignia, all of the above insignia require the wearer to be, or have been, on some sort of flight status in naval aircraft. Naval Aviation Supply Corps qualification does not require any sort of actual flight experience or flight status in a flight crew capacity.

In December 2009, the first of the new Professional Aviation Maintenance Officer (PAMO) warfare designators and insignia were awarded. The PAMO community consists of aerospace maintenance duty officers, aviation maintenance limited duty officers, and aviation maintenance chief warrant officers. Complete eligibility requirements can be found in OPNAVINST. 1412.11. Like the Naval Aviation Supply Corps qualification, the Professional Aircraft Maintenance Officer qualification also does not require any sort of actual flight experience or flight status in a flight crew capacity.

===== Expeditionary Warfare =====
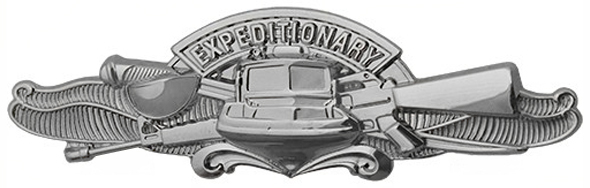
Enlisted Expeditionary Warfare Specialist (EXW) insignia

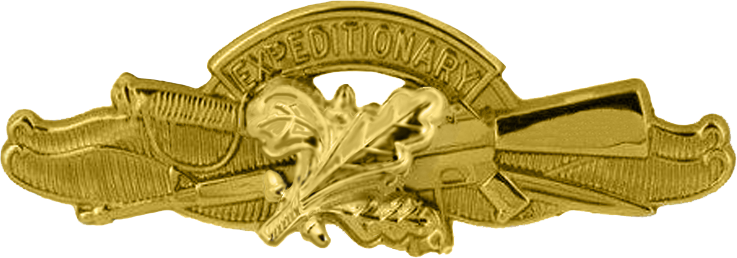
Expeditionary Supply Corps Officer (NESCO) insignia

The Enlisted Expeditionary Warfare Specialist Insignia is awarded to enlisted United States Navy personnel (and select United States Coast Guard personnel temporarily assigned to the U.S. Navy) who satisfactorily complete the required qualification course and pass a qualification board hearing. Enlisted members E-5 and above shall obtain the Enlisted Expeditionary Warfare (EXW) Specialist qualification while assigned to a qualifying unit. Enlisted members E-4 and below may voluntarily obtain EXW qualification while assigned to a qualifying unit and who meet eligibility requirements. The qualification was developed to provide a chance for enlisted sailors in the Navy Expeditionary Combat Command (NECC) community (naval personnel serving in a maritime security or maritime combat related role) to earn a warfare qualification. Core qualification skills include (but are not limited to) weapons qualification and maintenance, marksmanship, land navigation, field communications, and expeditionary camp deployment. The pin depicts the bow and superstructure of a Sea Ark 34 foot patrol boat superimposed on a crossed cutlass and M16A1 rifle on a background of ocean swells.

The Navy Expeditionary Supply Corps Officer (NESCO) program is designed to recognize significant contributions made by Supply Corps officers while serving in operational expeditionary billets. NESCO officer qualification represents a level of expeditionary knowledge that distinguishes an officer of the Supply Corps from his or her peers. The NESCO insignia is a gold metal pin showing a Supply Corps oak leaf centered, superimposed on a crossed sword and M16A1 rifle, on a background of ocean swells.

===== Explosive Ordnance Disposal Warfare =====
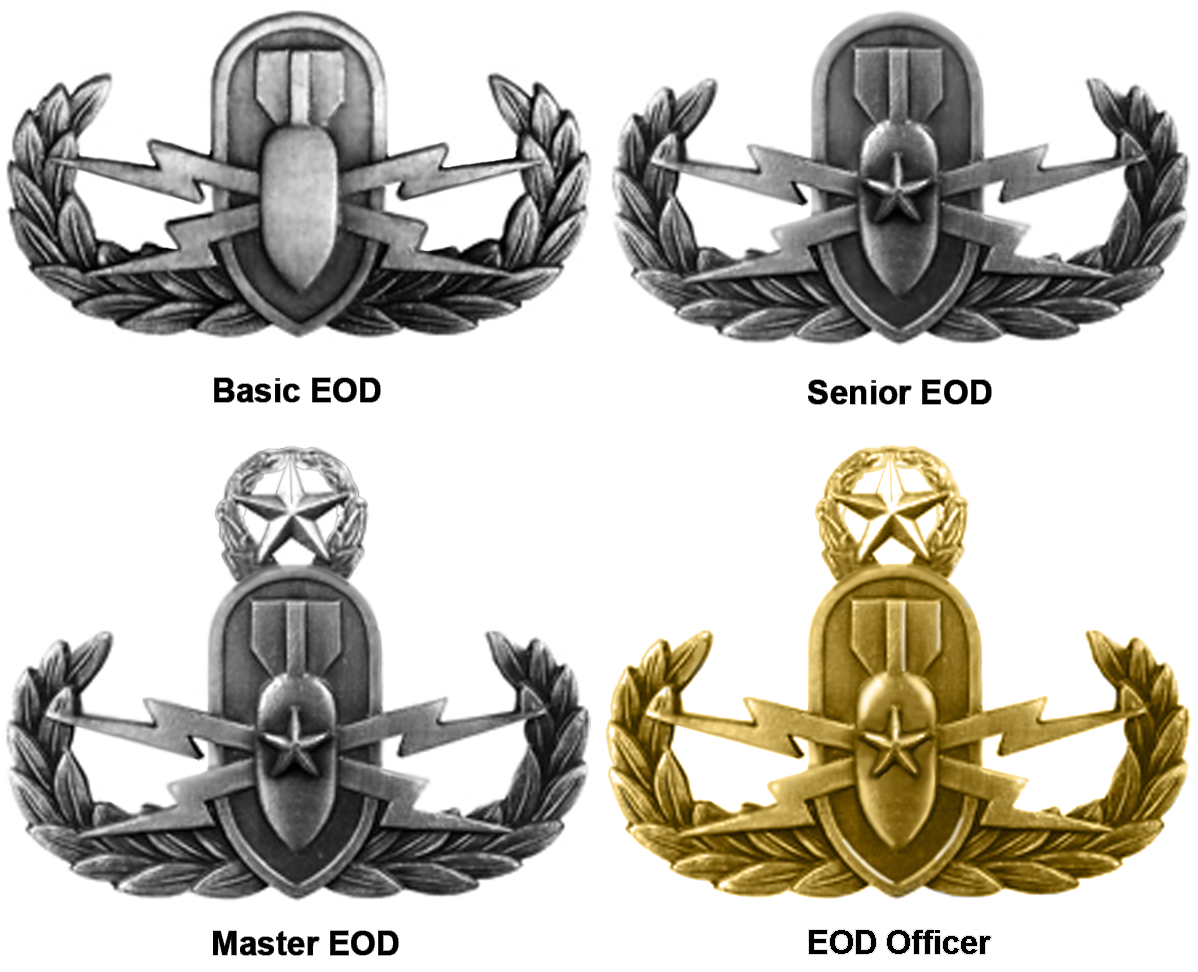
Explosive Ordnance Disposal Badges

The Explosive Ordnance Disposal Warfare (EOD) insignia, also known as the "crab", is awarded to personnel trained to deal with the construction, deployment, disarmament, and disposal of high explosives munitions. This group is part of Navy Special Operations and all are dive qualified as closed circuit divers. It is the only decoration awarded to all four uniformed services of the US Defense Department.

Enlisted EOD technicians wear the insignia as their primary warfare breast insignia. Officers formerly wore it as a secondary insignia under the Special Operations Warfare insignia, but now wear the EOD Officer insignia as their primary warfare device.

In 2007, the Special Operations Officer Community was rechristened "Explosive Ordnance Disposal", a change which the Navy felt also needed to be reflected in the EOD Officer warfare device as well. The new officer insignia is identical to the Master EOD warfare device, but is gold in color.

===== Fleet Marine Force =====
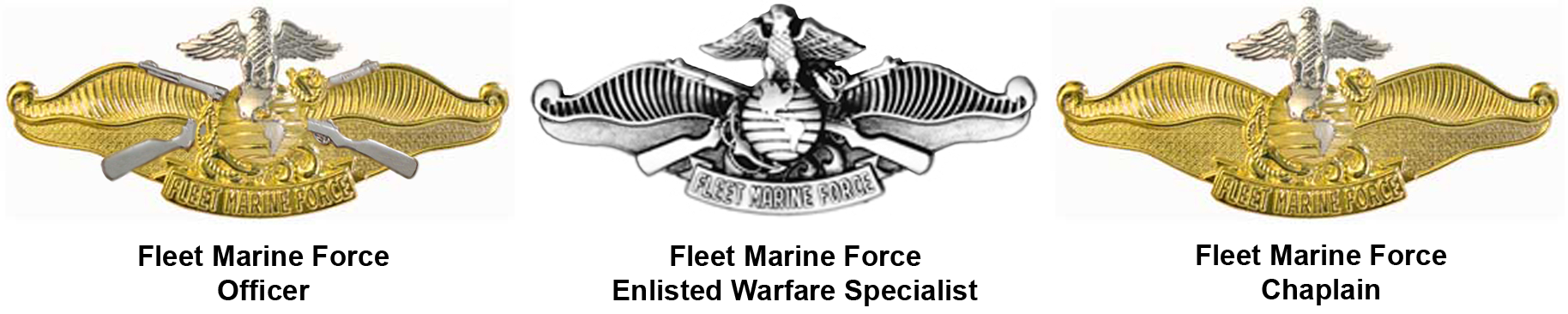
FMF insignias for officers, enlisted, and chaplains

The Fleet Marine Force (FMF) insignia can be awarded to Navy personnel assigned to Fleet Marine Force command, a combined command of Navy and Marine Corps. The insignia is earned by both officers and enlisted.

Hospital Corpsmen and Religious Programs Specialists are examples of Navy ratings in FMF.

The Chaplain (Chaps) version of the officers' badge does not include the crossed rifles.

===== Information Warfare =====
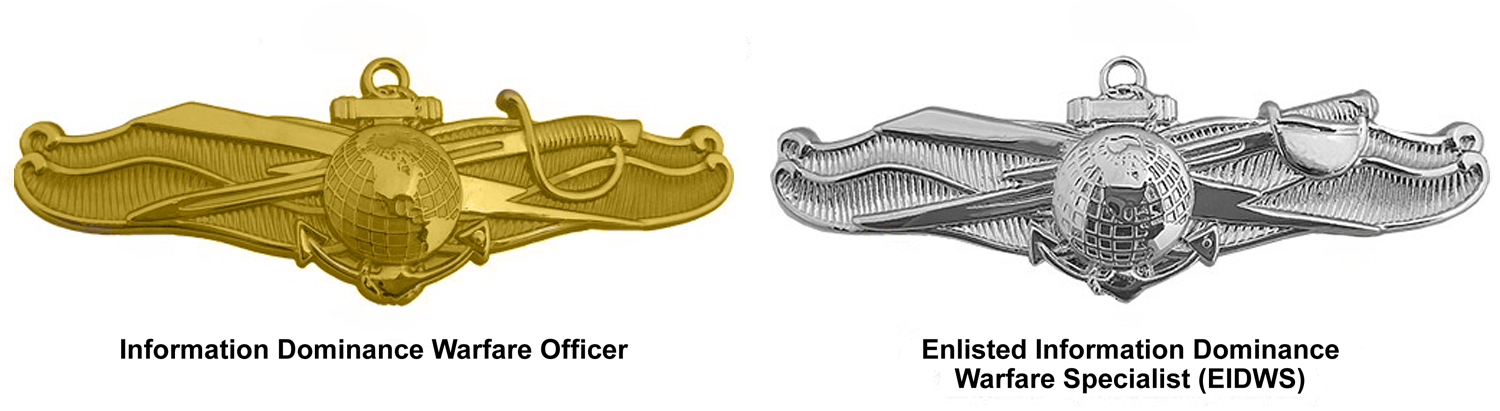
Navy Information Warfare Insignias

The Information Warfare insignia was approved in September 2010 and is authorized for wear by members of the Information Warfare Community who have successfully completed the qualification requirements outlined in OPNAVINST 1412.13 (for officers) and COMNAVCYBERFOR INST 1414.1 (for enlisted members). Upon implementation in September 2010, experienced Information Warfare Officers in the redesignated 18xx designators were afforded the opportunity to qualify for the IDWO Insignia through completion of an online course and the submission of evidence of prior completion of prescribed requirements. All Information Warfare Officers not being awarded the IWO Insignia via this method are required to complete the prescribed Officer PQS. The insignia became available for purchase in October 2010.

The Information Warfare Community includes the following communities: intelligence, information professional, cryptologic warfare (formerly information warfare), cyber, oceanography, meteorology, and space cadre additional qualification designators/NECs.

===== Seabee Combat Warfare Specialist =====
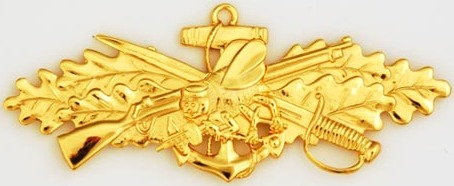
SCWS officer insignia

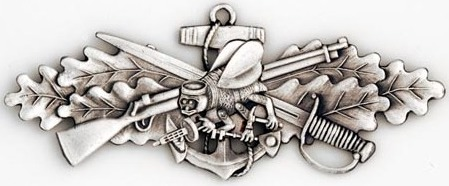
SCWS enlisted insignia

The Seabee Combat Warfare Specialist (SCWS) insignia is awarded to personnel assigned to qualifying units of the Naval Construction Force (Seabees) and Amphibious Construction Battalions after demonstrating superior proficiency in naval heritage, naval doctrine, command and control, hazardous material/hazardous waste environmental safety, supply & logistics, communications and communications security, weapons, general military tactics, contingency operations, embarkation, safety, basic first aid, civil engineer support equipment, and chemical, biological, & radiological warfare.

The two insignia variants correspond to the gold officer insignia and silver enlisted insignia. Officers are required to complete all aspects of the enlisted program, plus additional officer specific requirements while overall demonstrating broader and deeper knowledge proficiency commensurate with their increased responsibilities.

Qualifying units include Naval Mobile Construction Battalions (NMCB), Underwater Construction Teams (UCT), and Construction Battalion Maintenance Units (CBMU), and personnel assigned to Amphibious Construction Battalions (ACB).

===== Special Operations Warfare =====
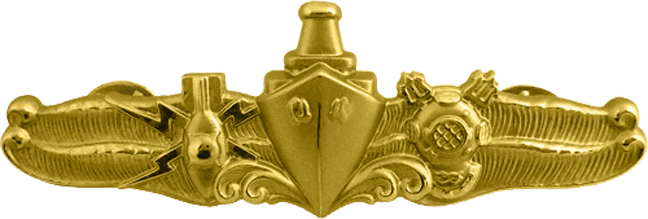
SPECOPS insignia

The Special Operations Officer Insignia (SPECOPS), was earned by officers by virtue of training in the Explosive Ordnance Disposal (EOD), Mine Countermeasures (MCM), Operational Diving and Salvage (ODS), and Expendable Ordnance Management (EOM). Not to be confused with Special Warfare (i.e. SEALs), Special Operations, in Navy parlance, refers to dive qualified EOD technicians and since 2007 the EOD Officer insignia has replaced this badge.

===== Special Warfare =====
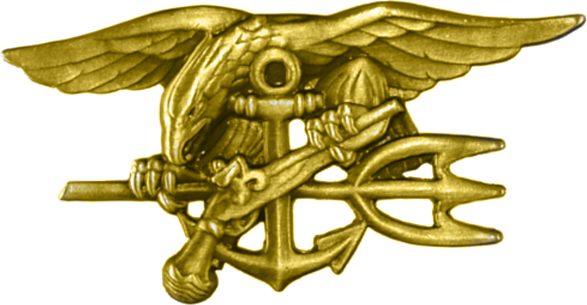
SEAL Trident insignia

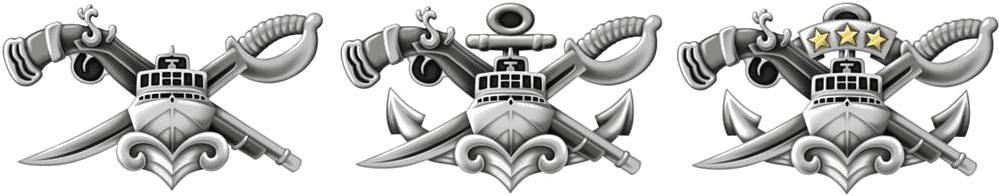
SWCC insignias (from left to right: Basic, Senior, and Master)

There are two Special Warfare insignia issued to Navy personnel serving under Naval Special Warfare Command, a part of USSOCOM: Special Warfare and Special Warfare Combatant-Craft Crewman.

The Special Warfare insignia (aka the "SEAL Trident" or simply "Trident"), is awarded to personnel who completed BUD/S training and qualification, and have been designated as Navy SEALs and assigned to Navy SEAL Teams or SEAL Delivery Vehicle (SDV) Teams. The insignia is the same for both officer and enlisted personnel and is one of only four breast insignia authorized for enlisted personnel that is gold in color.

The Special Warfare Combatant-Craft Crewman (SWCC - pronounced "swick") insignia is awarded to enlisted personnel who complete SWCC training and qualification, and have been designated as United States Navy SWCCs assigned to Special Boat Teams. The SWCC qualification insignia consists of three separate insignias that denote the level of qualification achieved individually by SWCC sailors. The insignias include SWCC Basic, SWCC Senior, and SWCC Master. The SWCC Basic insignia is a 2-1/2 by 1-1/4 inch silver matte metal pin showing a background of a cocked flintlock pistol, a crossed naval enlisted cutlass, and a Mark V Special Operations Craft atop a bow wave. The SWCC Senior insignia incorporates an upright anchor in the background of the SWCC Basic insignia. The SWCC Master insignia incorporates a banner with three gold stars on the upper portion of the anchor from the SWCC Senior insignia.

===== Strategic Sealift Officer Warfare =====
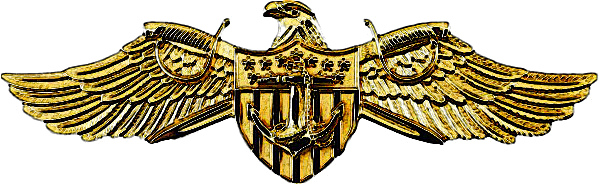
Strategic Sealift Officer Warfare insignia

The newest surface warfare qualification insignia to be implemented by the U.S. Navy is the Strategic Sealift Officer Warfare Insignia (SSOWI). The SSOWI is a redesign of the old Navy Reserve Merchant Marine Insignia, also known as the "Golden Chicken" or "Sea Chicken", originally created in 1938. The SSOWI is approved for wear by officers who have successfully completed the qualification requirements outlined in OPNAVINST 1534.1E. The insignia may be worn by:

- A Commissioned Officer in the U.S. Navy (or in the Naval Reserves) holding a valid U.S. Merchant Marine License for vessels of unlimited ocean tonnage or horsepower.
- U.S. Merchant Marine Officers who are U.S. Navy Reserve officers while wearing U.S. Navy, U.S. Merchant Marine or U.S. Maritime Service uniforms.
- Midshipmen at the United States Merchant Marine Academy are entitled to wear the old Navy Reserve Merchant Marine Insignia while in good standing as members of the U.S. Navy Strategic Sealift Officer Program until fully qualified as SSOs where the old pin is replaced by the SSOWI.

The SSOWI is gold in color and is 2 3/4 by 7/8 inch (70 by 22 mm), reflecting the background of an eagle from the USS Constitution's stern, crossed naval officer swords, and a U.S. shield with fouled anchor from the U.S. Merchant Marine flag.

===== Submarine Warfare =====
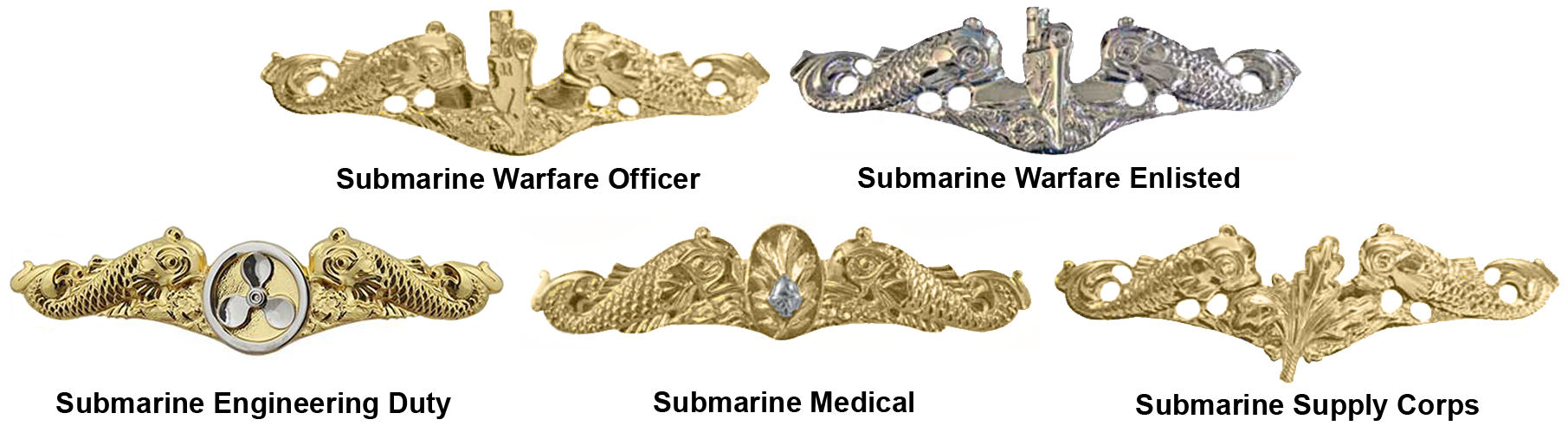
Submarine Warfare insignias

Submarine Qualification insignia (usually known as "dolphins") are breast insignia of the submarine warfare community which are issued to those naval personnel after they complete a complex, demanding and extensive program that incorporates learning each system aboard the submarine and completion of certain watchstanding requirements including cross rate watch requirements. This program differs from many of the other "Warfare" programs in that it requires personnel to become proficient in engineering and operational details to such an extent that each person must be able to understand and perform basic operation of each system and equipment aboard the submarine.

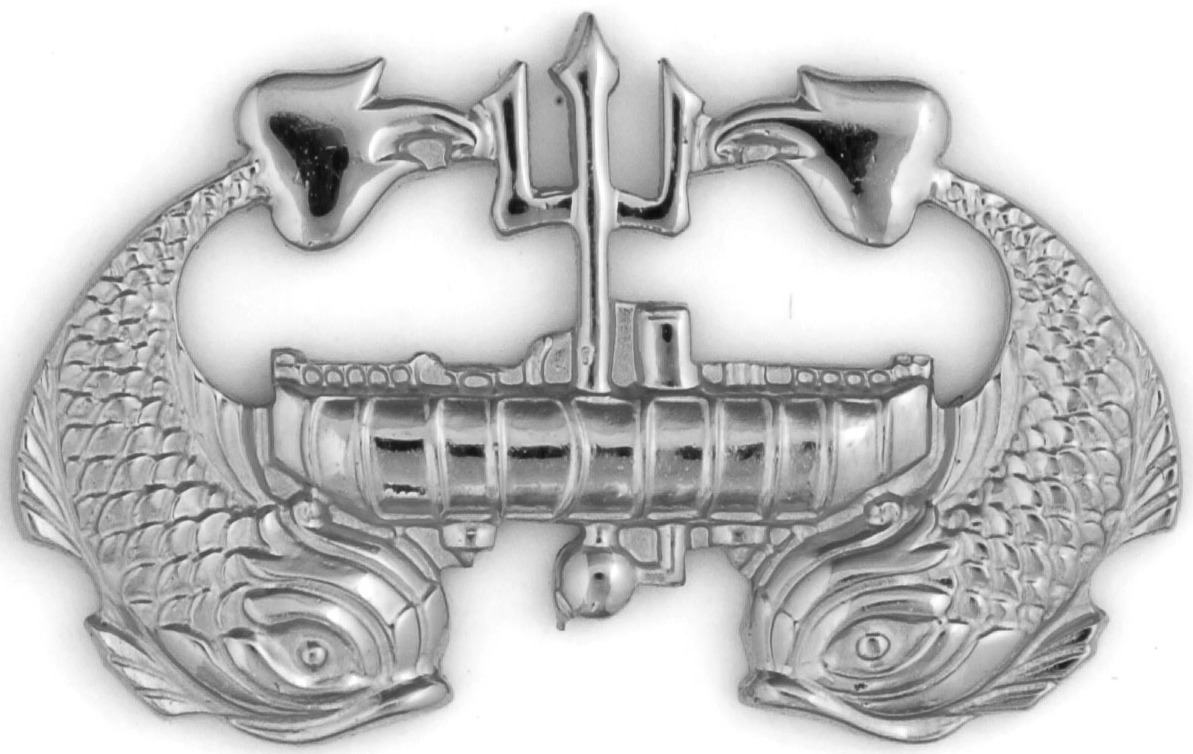
Deep Submergence enlisted

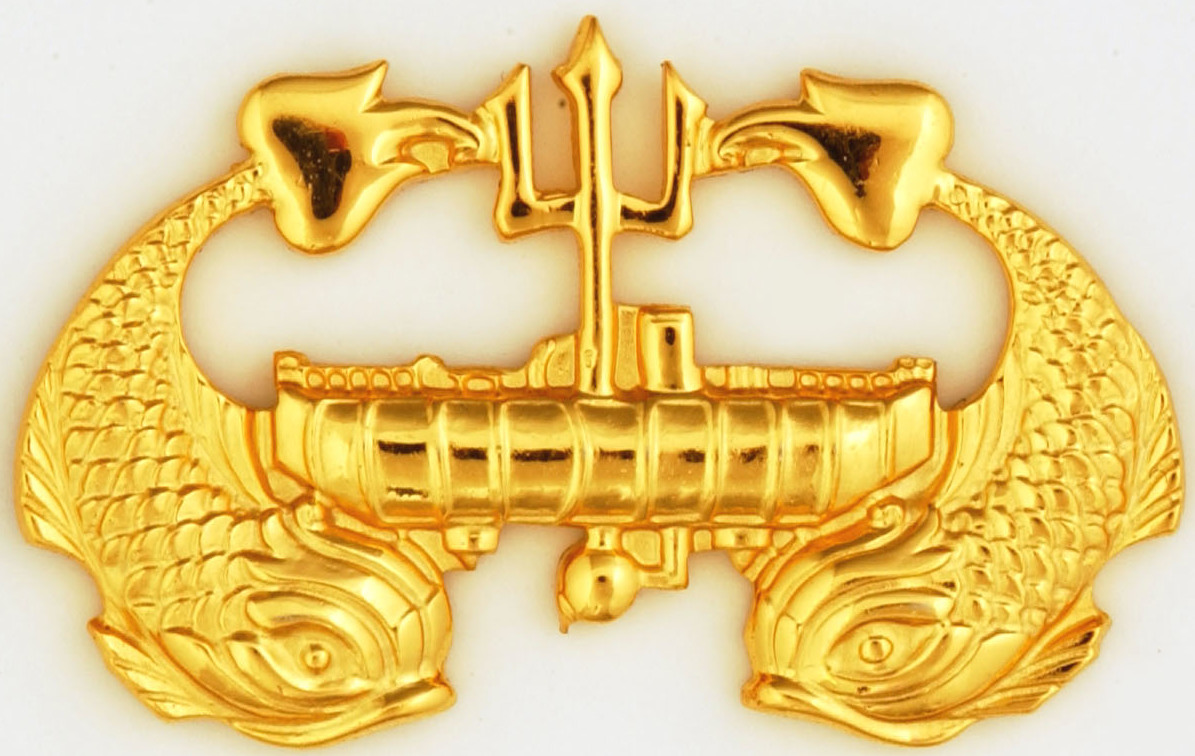
Deep Submergence officers

In addition each person must be able to efficiently perform damage control and emergency control functions in each space on the submarine. The Submarine Qualification insignia for officers and enlisted was first proposed by then-Captain Ernest King on 13 June 1923, with the current design finalized March 1924. In addition to line officer and enlisted versions, there are insignia for engineering duty officers, medical corps officers, and supply corps officers.

The Deep Submergence insignia is worn by Navy personnel who are qualified in submarines and have completed one year of regular assignment to a crewed or uncrewed deep submersible.

===== Surface Warfare =====
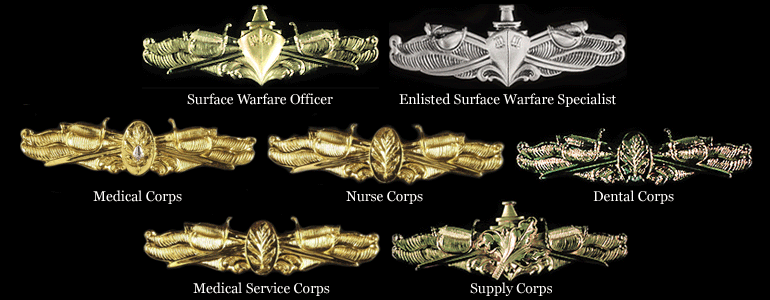
Surface Warfare insignias

Surface Warfare insignia are breast insignia of the surface warfare community. They are earned by those naval personnel who are trained and qualified to perform duties aboard United States surface warships. The Surface Warfare Officer insignia was first proposed in 1972, and by 1980 a variety of the Surface Warfare insignia had been approved for issuance.

Line officers of the surface warfare community earn the Surface Warfare Officer (SWO) insignia. Enlisted personnel who complete the Enlisted Surface Warfare qualification program earn the Enlisted Surface Warfare Specialist (ESWS) insignia. Other insignia for qualification in specialized areas exist in the Medical Corps, Nurse Corps, Dental Corps, Medical Service Corps, and Supply Corps.

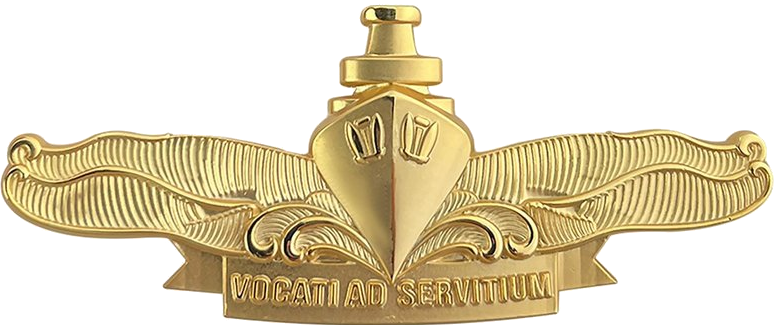
Surface Chaplain Officer Qualification Insignia

The SWO and ESWS insignia may be earned by United States Coast Guard personnel assigned to Navy commands.

The Surface Chaplain Officer Qualification Insignia is a newly introduced warfare pin for members of the surface chaplain corps. The qualification insignia started being awarded to qualified chaplains in 2023 after being approved by the Navy Uniform Board.

==== Other Qualifications ====
===== Engineering Duty Officer =====
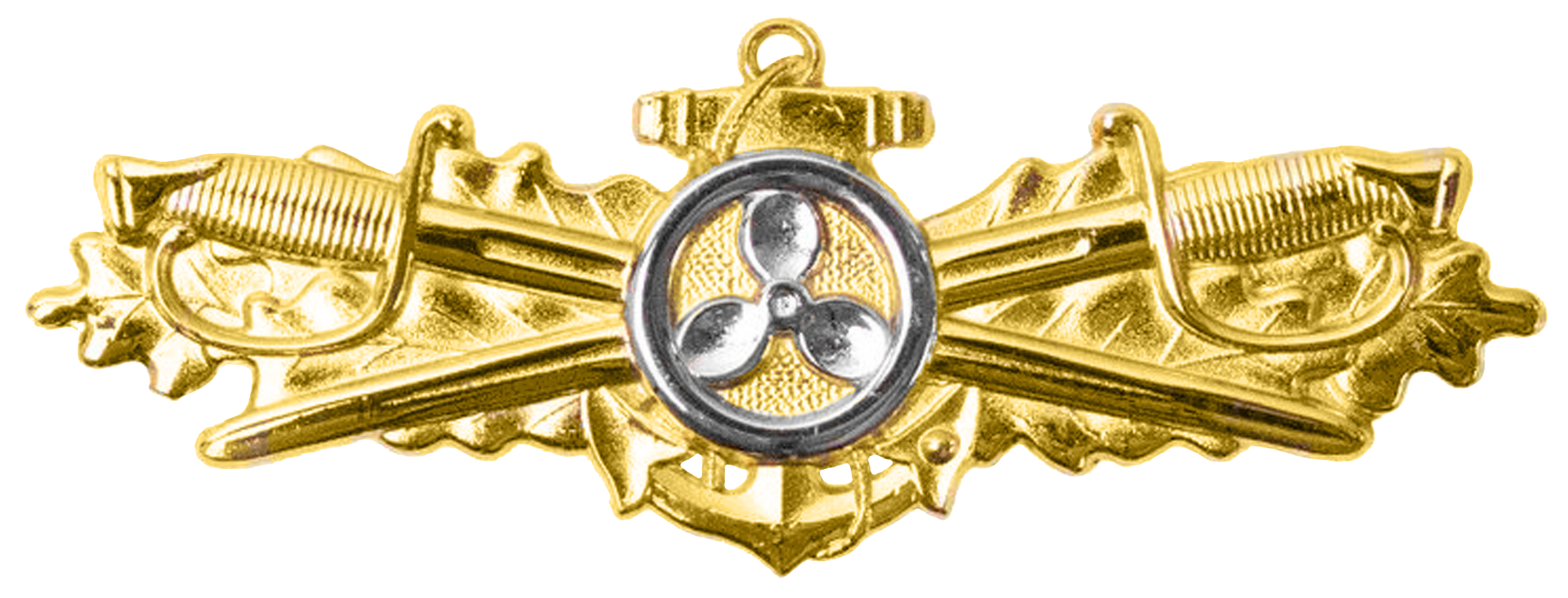
EDO insignia

An Engineering Duty Officer (EDO) is a restricted line officer, involved with the design, acquisition, construction, repair, maintenance, conversion, overhaul, and disposal of ships, submarines, aircraft carriers, and the systems installed aboard (weapons, command and control, communications, computers, etc.). As of 1 August 2016, there are approximately 835 engineering duty officers on active duty in the United States Navy, representing approximately 2 percent of its active-duty commissioned officers (and approximately 400 engineering duty officers in the Navy Reserve).

===== Integrated Undersea Surveillance System =====
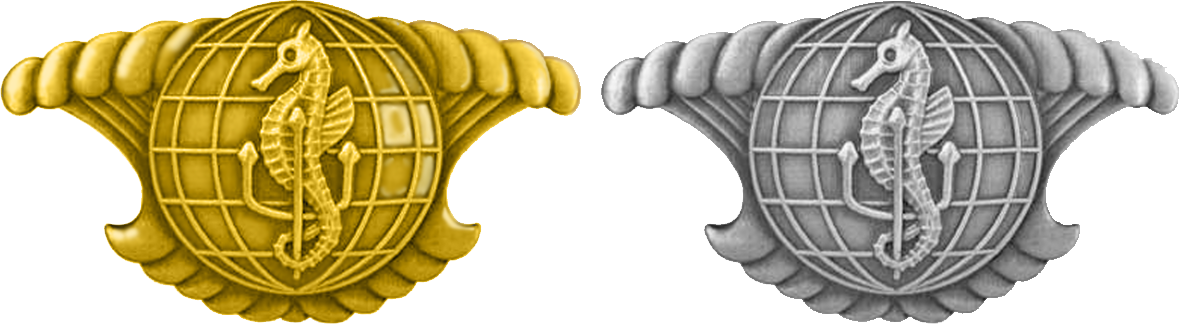
Undersea surveillance insignias

The Integrated Undersea Surveillance System insignia is awarded to those personnel who have been trained and qualified in naval sonar and undersea surveillance (SOSUS) technology.

===== Navy Security Force =====
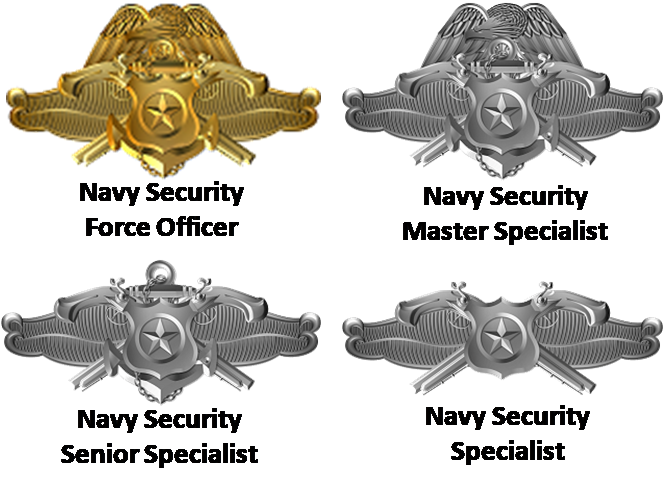
Navy Security Force insignias

The Navy Security Force insignia program officially began in April 2022 with the release of NAVADMIN 094/22. The program allows active duty and reserve sailors and officers in the Navy Security Force community to earn a qualification that indicates their mastery of security force knowledge. Sailors in the Navy Security Force community can earn the Specialist, Senior Specialist, Master Specialist, and Officer insignia depending on their pay grade and qualification.

===== Nuclear Weapons Security =====
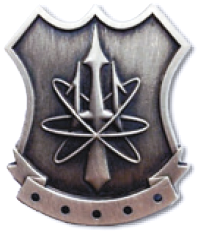
Enlisted

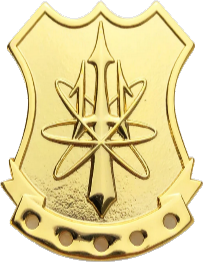
Officer

The Navy Nuclear Weapons Security Insignia (NWS) is awarded to enlisted sailors and officers assigned to a Strategic Weapons Facility, Personnel Reliability Program , supporting missions associated with the Marine Corps Security Force Battalion, or are qualified in their senior post or watch station consistent with their current pay grade and duties assigned. For enlisted sailors, the insignia represents completion of twelve months of fully qualified service to the NWS mission. A gold star mounted at the bottom of the insignia indicates an additional year of qualified service to the NWS mission. A silver star indicates five years of fully qualified service.

===== Parachutists =====
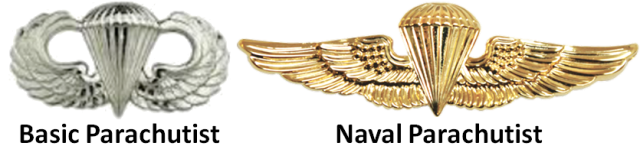
Two degrees of parachutists insignia

The Parachutists insignia, also known as "jump wings", is awarded to personnel for training in airborne school. The basic insignia is issued for completion of basic parachutist training. The Naval Parachutist insignia is issued after 10 qualifying jumps. It is used both by the Navy and the Marine Corps.

Enlisted personnel with jump wings place "(PJ)" after their rating to indicate this skill. Free-fall/HALO qualified place "(FPJ)" in their rating. Example: "EOD3(FPJ) Smith" is Explosive Ordnance Disposal 3rd Class Smith, who is Free-fall/HALO-qualified.

The Naval Parachutist insignia is a common secondary insignia among Navy SEALs, SWCC, Navy EOD, and Special Amphibious Reconnaissance Corpsman. It is one of only four gold color breast insignia awarded to qualified enlisted personnel.

===== Small Craft/Craftmaster =====
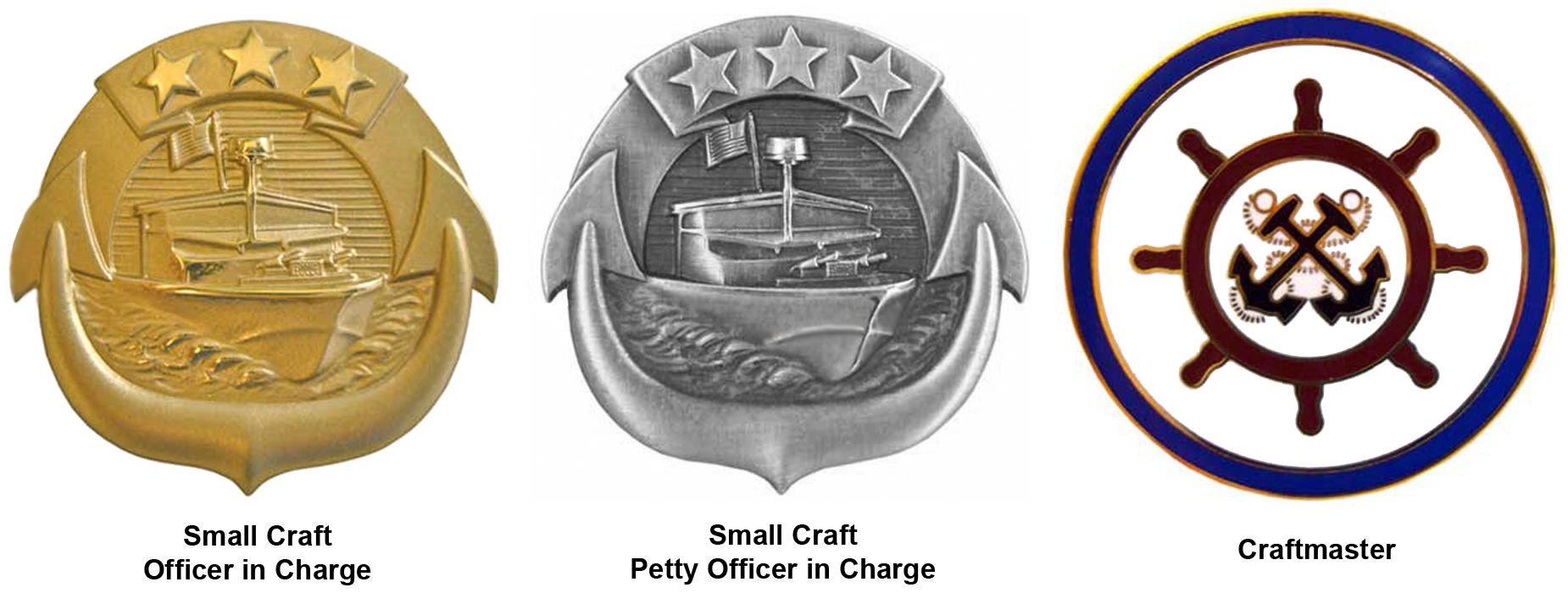
Insignias of the small boat community

The Small Craft Officer in Charge/Petty Officer in Charge insignia are issued to personnel of the small boat community. They are issued to operators of small combatant and non-combatant vessels.

The Small Craft insignia is awarded to officers and petty officers commanding small combatant vessels that patrol brown-water (littoral zone) and riverine environments.

The Craftmaster insignia is awarded mainly to enlisted personnel commanding vessels, such as Landing Craft Utility, Landing Craft Air Cushioned, YTBs, and various other tugs and barges. It is also awarded to certain staff officers and a few select midshipmen.

===== Submarine Patrol =====
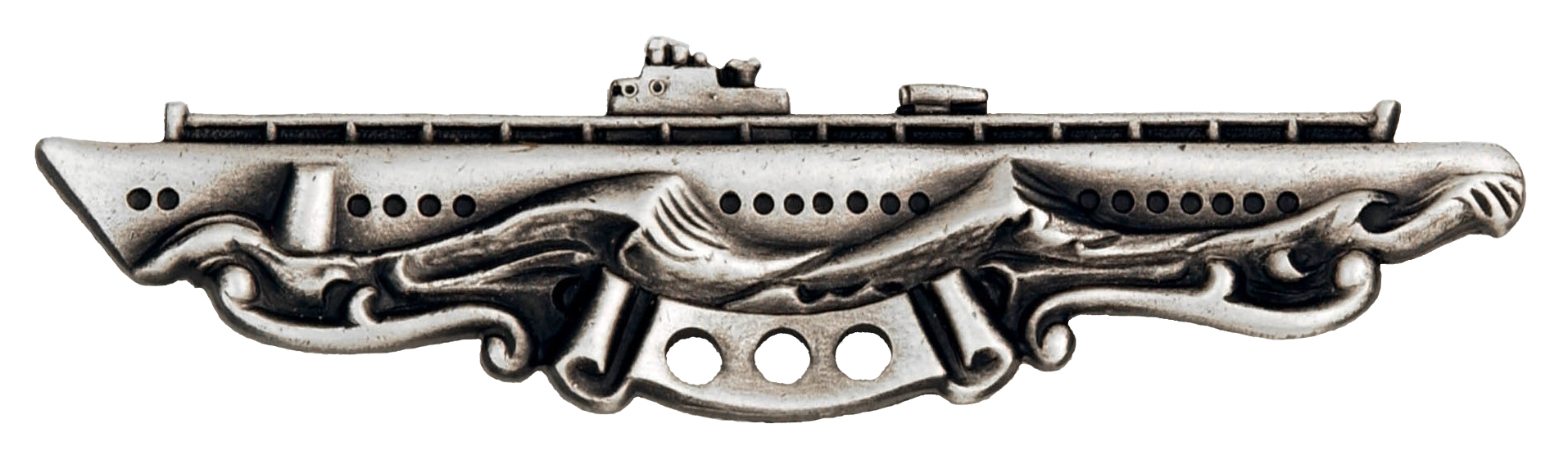
Submarine Combat Patrol insignia

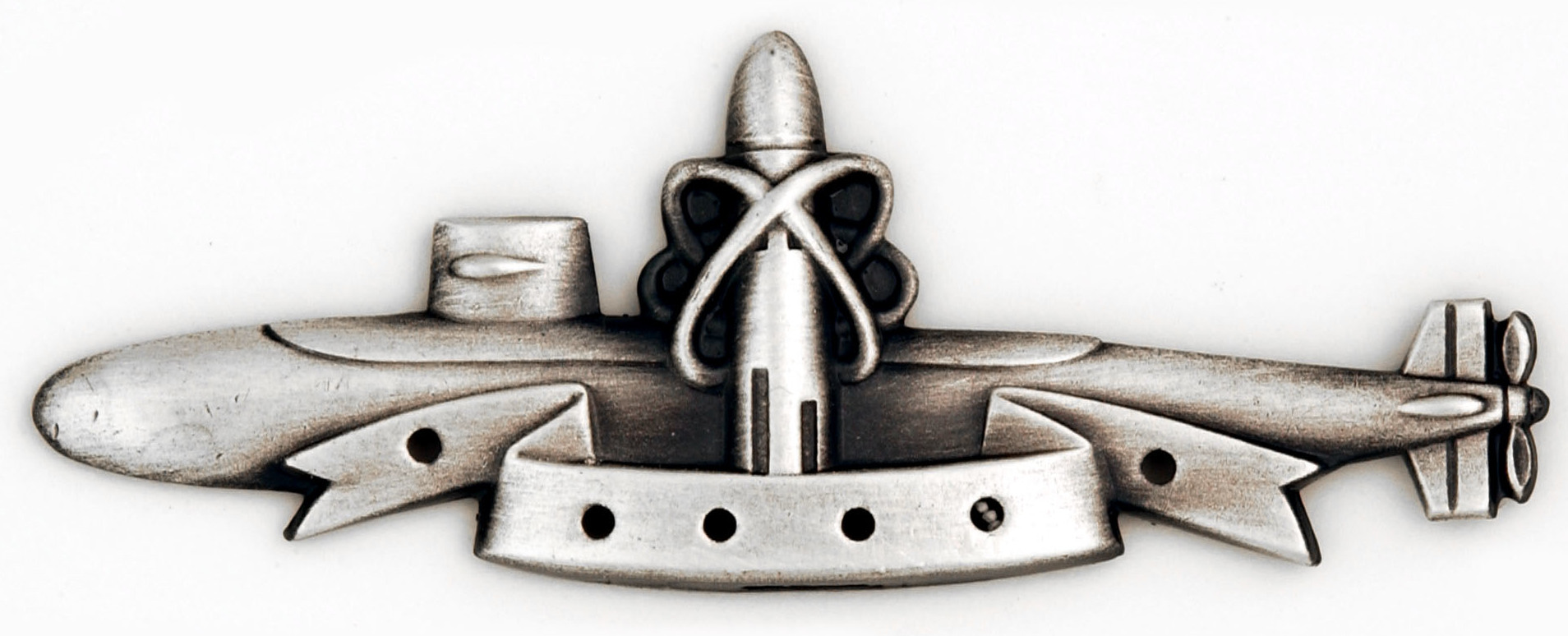
SSBN Deterrent Patrol Pin, in silver

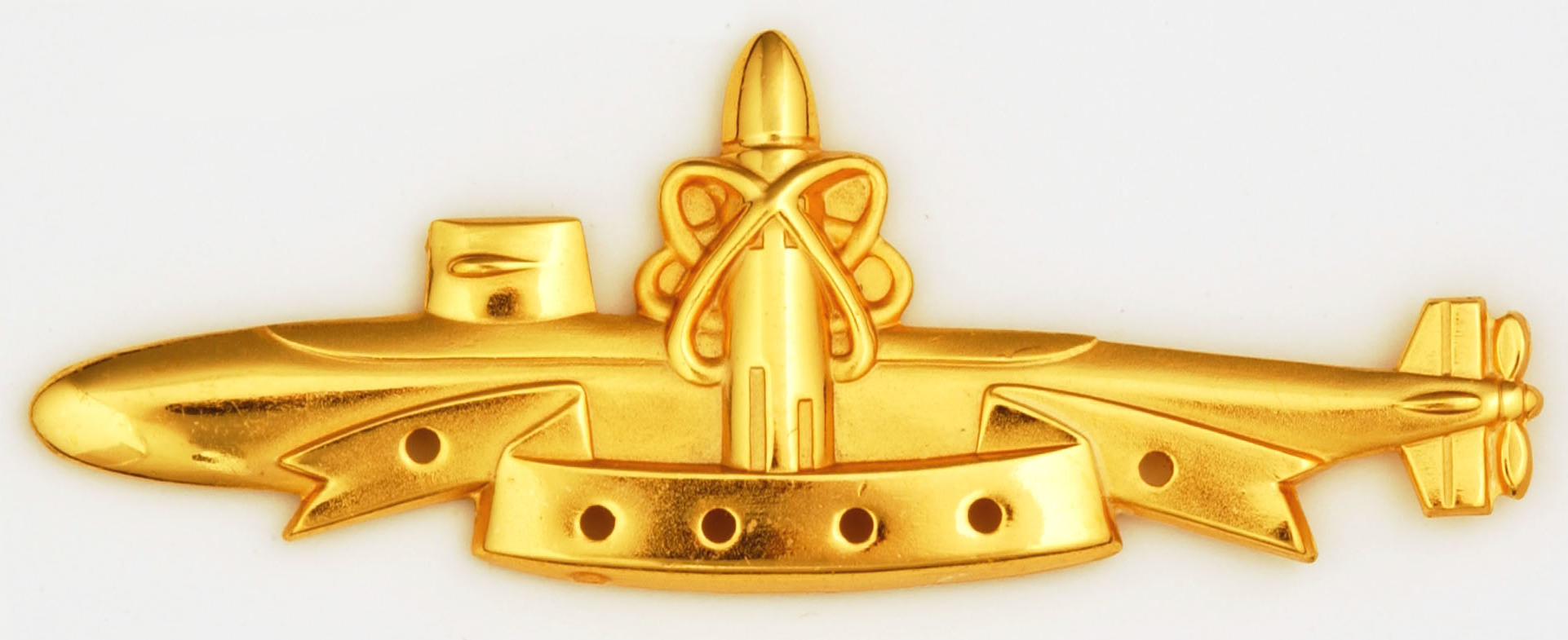
SSBN Deterrent Patrol Pin, in gold.

The Submarine Combat Patrol insignia is a breast insignia worn by Navy personnel who have completed war patrols. Such patrols were conducted during World War II and this insignia has not been awarded since that time.

The SSBN Deterrent Patrol insignia or "boomer pin" is a breast insignia worn by Navy personnel of the submarine service who have completed strategic deterrent patrols in nuclear ballistic missile submarines. It is the successor to the Submarine Combat Patrol insignia awarded for submarine patrols during World War II. Upon the completion of their 20th successful patrol, personnel are upgraded from silver to gold. The insignia is the same for both officer and enlisted personnel and is one of only four breast insignia authorized for enlisted personnel that is gold in color.

Qualified personnel wear the insignia as a secondary device, after the Submarine Warfare device.

===== Underwater =====
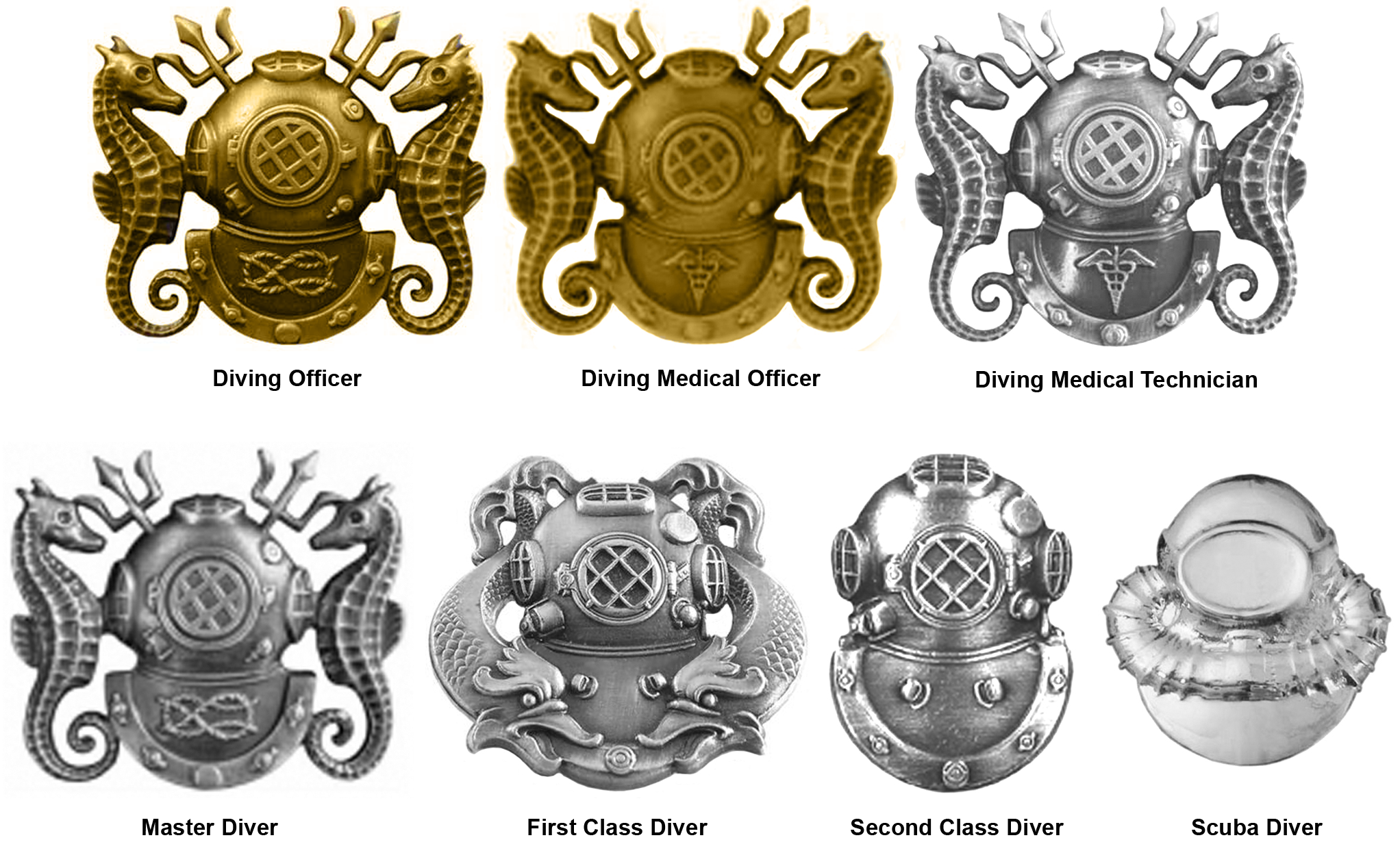
Navy Diver insignias

Diver insignia are issued to personnel who are qualified divers and is given in several degrees. The first degree of the diving insignia is Scuba Diver. The remaining insignia are awarded for deep sea dive qualifications and are issued in the degrees of Second Class, First Class, and Master Diver. There also exists a Diving Officer insignia for officers who completed Basic Diving Officer course, and insignia for medical personnel who have qualified as both divers and medical response personnel to medical emergencies underwater.

Enlisted personnel who are dive qualified place "(DV)" after their rating to indicate this skill. Example: "PO2(DV) Jones" is a Petty Officer 2nd Class Jones, who is Diver-qualified.

== Badges ==
=== Identification ===
The Presidential and Vice Presidential Service badges are worn on the right side at a level corresponding to badges worn on the left side on dress uniforms, and center of the right pocket on other uniforms. The badges for Office of the Secretary of Defense and Joint Chiefs of Staff are worn on the left breast pocket, 1/4 inch below medals or secondary breast insignia on dress uniforms, and in the center of left pocket on other uniforms. If a breast insignia in the secondary position forces the badge below the lower seam of the pocket, the secondary insignia must be omitted. (see figure 1)

The Command Senior Enlisted Leader Identification Badge for E-7s and higher (see figure 2) are issued to chiefs holding a command position (e.g. senior enlisted of the entire Navy, of a fleet or task force, of a single ship, etc.). Male incumbents wear it on the left breast pocket, 1/4 inch below medals or secondary breast insignia on dress uniforms, and in the center of left pocket on other uniforms. If a breast insignia in the secondary position forces the badge below the lower seam of the pocket, the secondary insignia must be omitted. Women wear it 1/4 inch above the right pocket, but may opt to wear it as men do. Miniature versions are issued to post tour chiefs.

Recruiting, Recruit Commanders, and Career Counselor badges are worn on the left breast pocket, 1/4 inch below medals or secondary breast insignia on dress uniforms, and in the center of left pocket on other uniforms. The only exception is the U.S. Navy Law Enforcement badges (Naval Security Force, Command Master-at-Arms, and Naval Corrections), which is worn 1/4 inch above the name tape or name tag of the uniform, above the right breast pocket. The Navy Law Enforcement "Chief Master-at-Arms" and "Naval Corrections" badges are only issued and worn for the duration of the personnel's assigned duties for that position, with the exception of the "Naval Security Force" badge which are issued to rated Master-at-Arms and Security Officers, which are uniquely serialized and issued to the person for the duration of their career. Not permitted for wear on dinner dress uniform (see figures 3 through 6).

Although not worn on Navy uniforms, the Naval Criminal Investigative Service (NCIS) badge is also an identification badge of the U.S. Navy but is used by NCIS Special Agents, which are Naval Excepted Service employees. The badge is worn as an embroidered badge on jackets or displayed as part of a special agent's credentials (see figure 7).

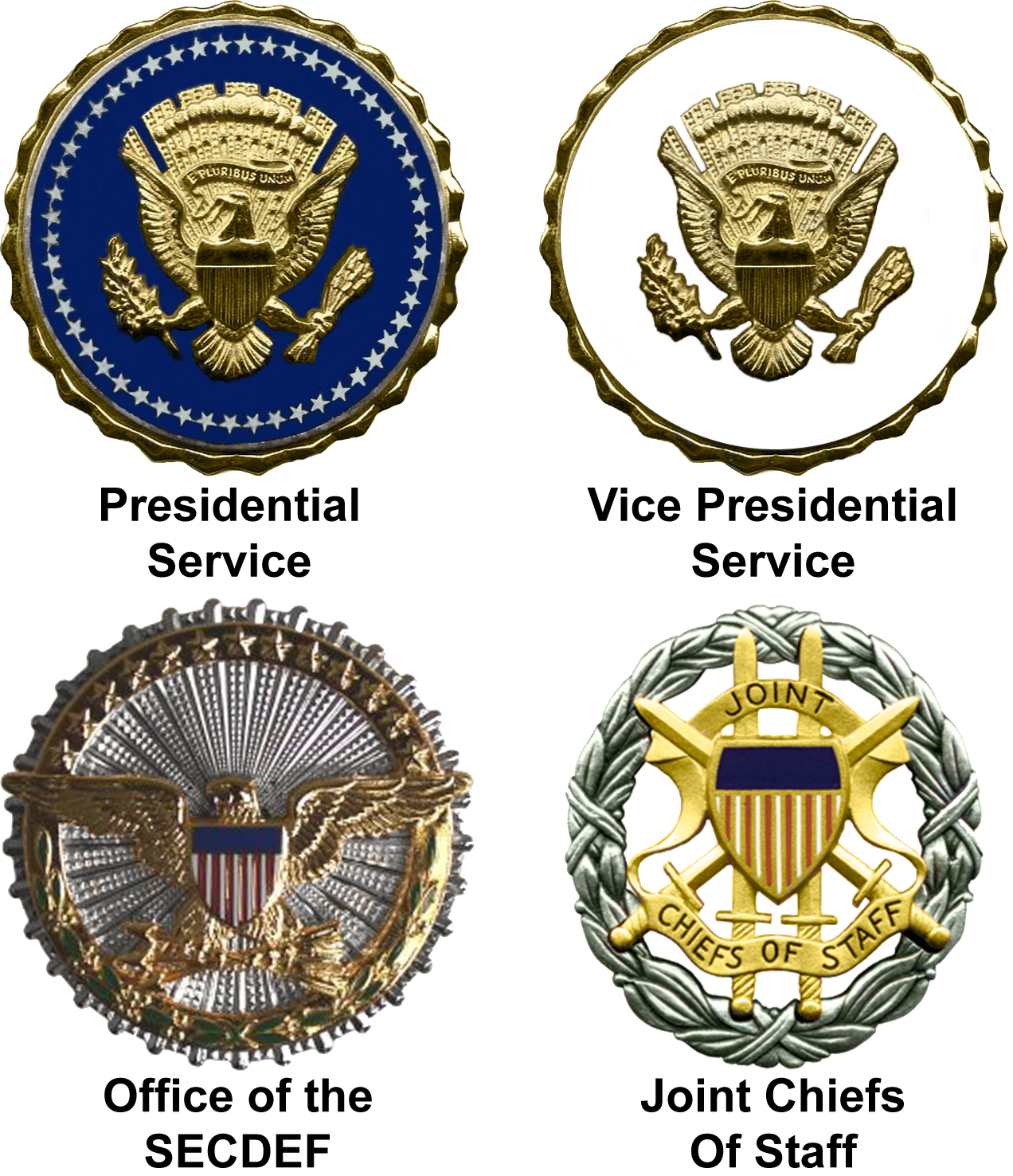
Figure 1: Presidential Service, Vice Presidential Service, Office of the Secretary of Defense, Joint Chiefs

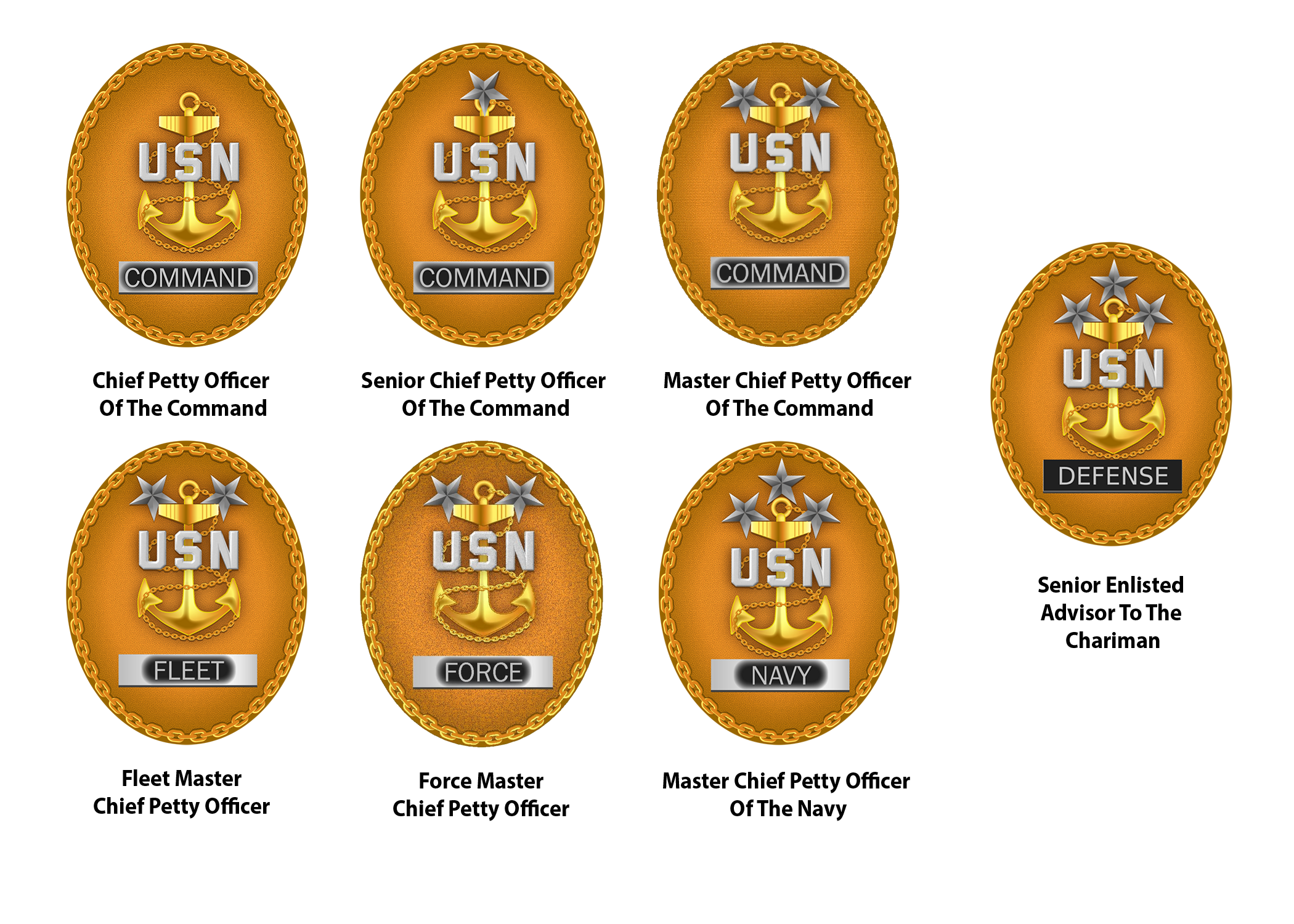
Figure 2: US Navy Chiefs Identification Badges

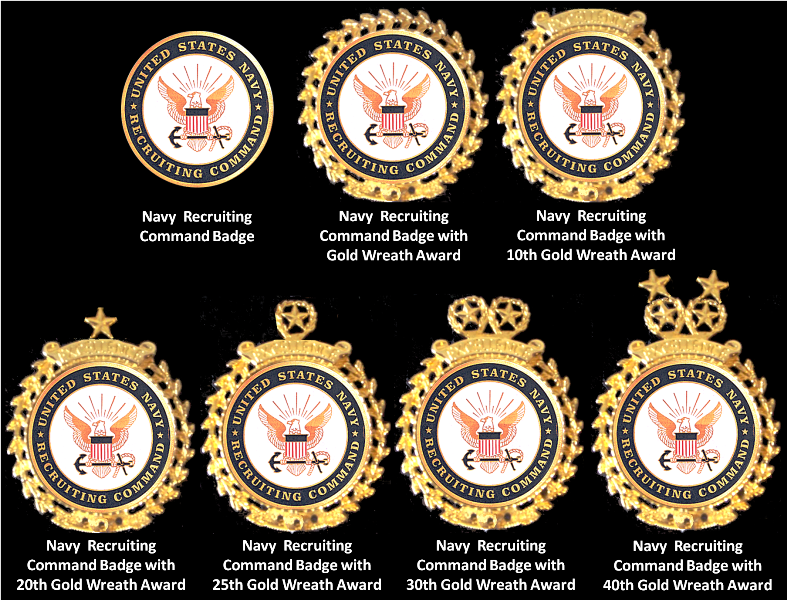
Figure 3: Recruiting Command Badges

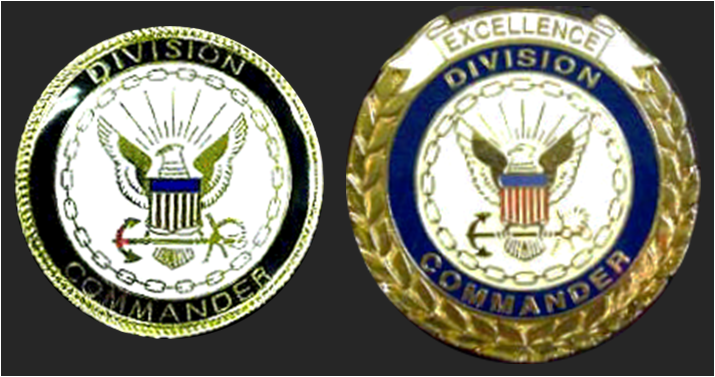
Figure 4: Recruit Division Commander Badges

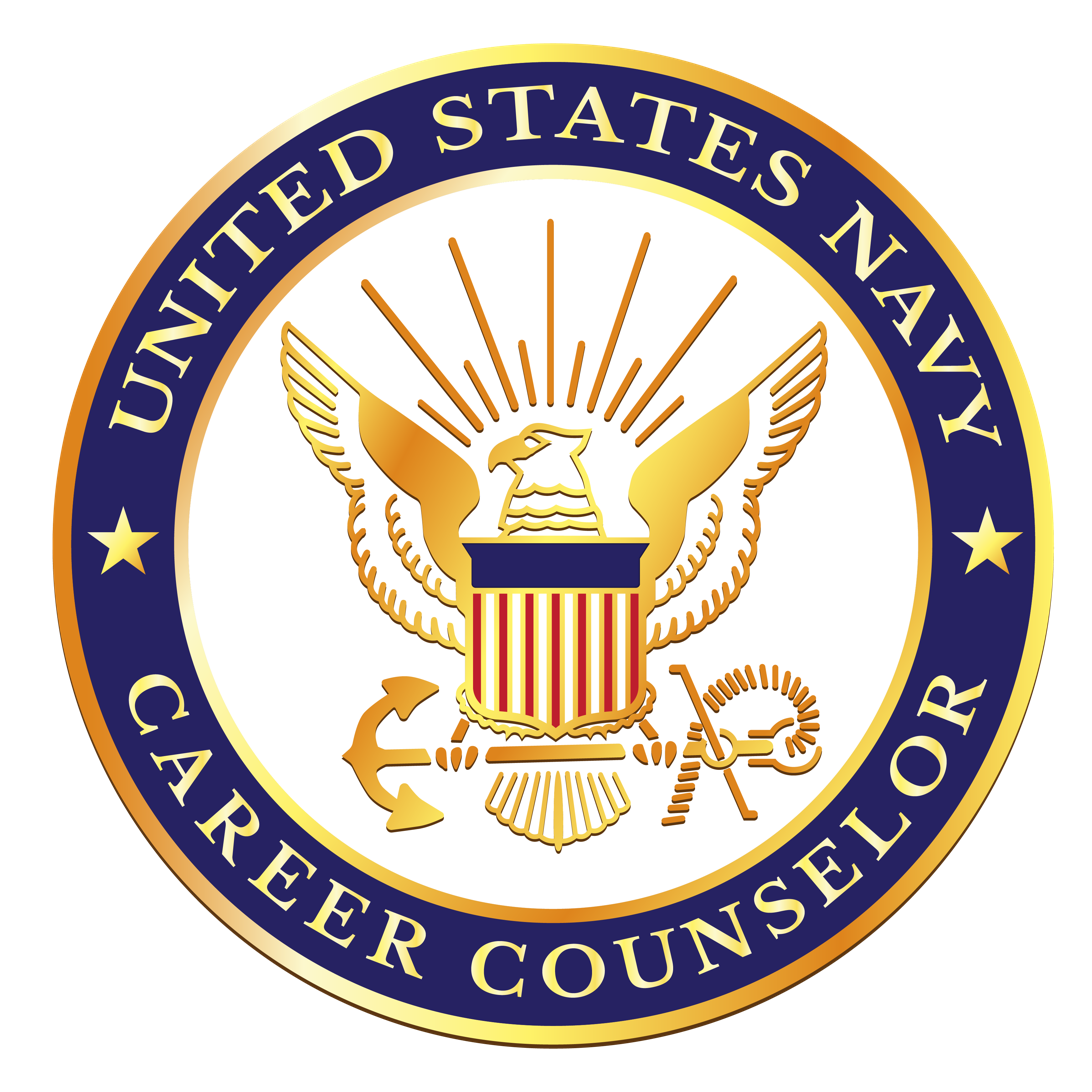
Figure 5: Career Counselor Badge

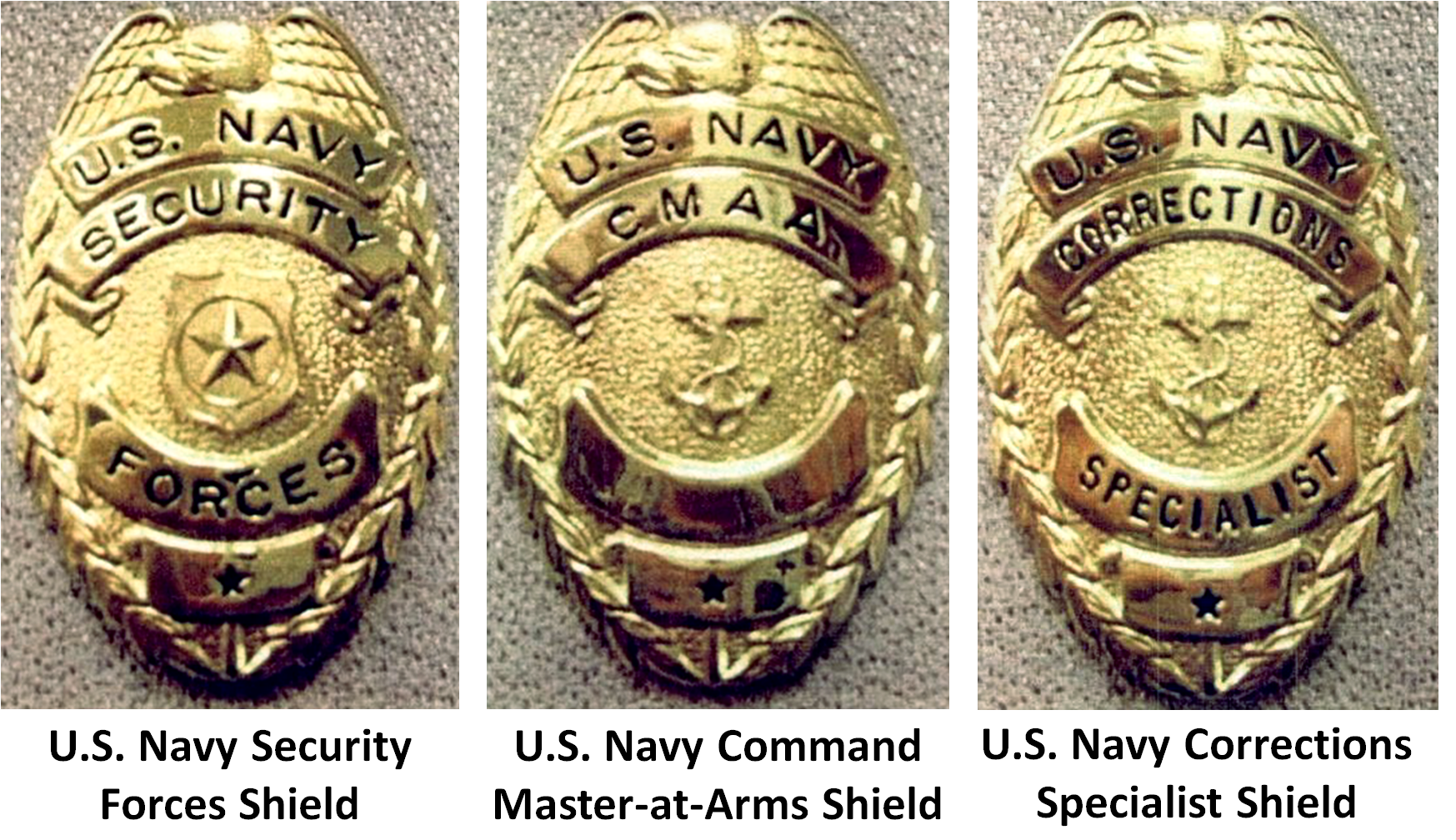
Figure 6: Law Enforcement Badges

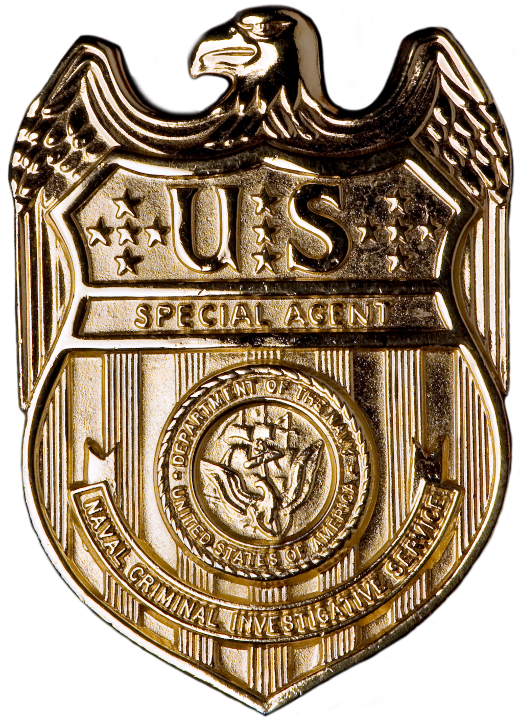
Figure 7: Naval Criminal Investigative Service Badge

Navy Uniform Regulations also allow CNO-approved Joint/Unified Command identification badges, including:

- United Nations
- Defense Intelligence Agency
- National Security Agency
- National Geospatial-Intelligence Agency
- Defense Information Systems Agency
- Army Medical Department Center/School
- Defense Commissary Agency
- Inter-American Defense College Command
- Department of State
- Defense Threat Reduction Agency
- Defense Finance and Accounting Service
- Defense Logistics Agency
- NATO EASTLANT
- Military Postal Service Agency
- U.S. Northern Command/North American Aerospace Defense Command
- U.S. Africa Command
- U.S. Special Operations Command
- U.S. Pacific Command
- U.S. Central Command
- U.S. Transportation Command
- U.S. Strategic Command
- U.S. European Command
- U.S. Southern Command
- U.S. Cyber Command
- Supreme Headquarters Allied Powers Europe
- Allied Forces Southern Europe
- Air Education and Training Command Instructor Badge
- U.S. Forces Japan
- National Defense University
- Joint Intelligence Center Pacific
- Joint Communications Support Element

=== Marksmanship ===
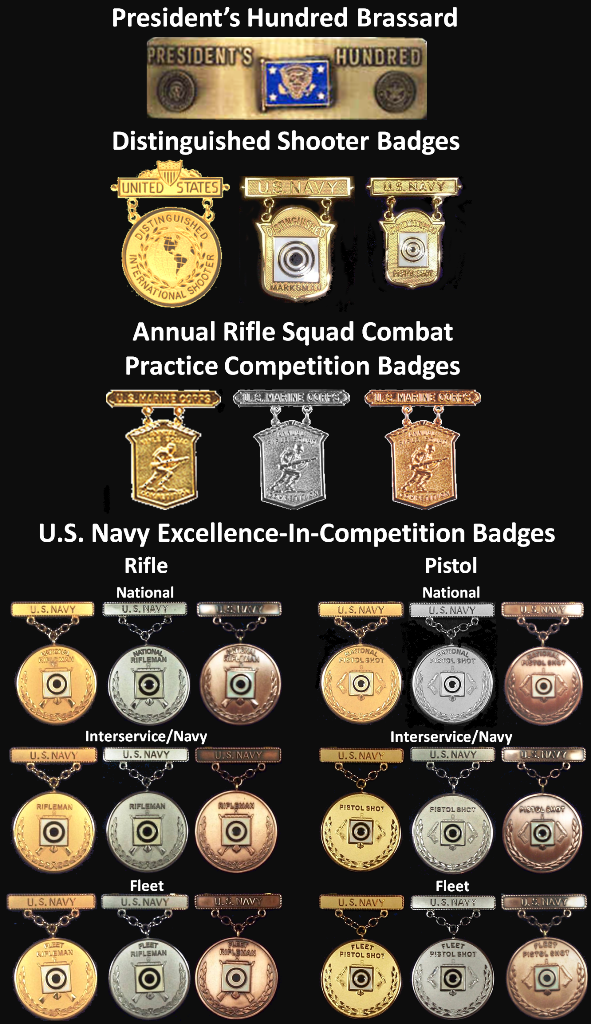
U.S. Navy authorized CMP and Navy marksmanship competition badges

The U.S. Navy also has Marksmanship Competition Badges that are authorized for wear on Navy service uniforms for those sailors and officers who earn them. These badges are awarded by the Navy to sailors and officers upon receipt of official scores, known as "leg points", earned at an authorized Civilian Marksmanship Program (CMP) competition. In addition, sailors can earn and wear the President's Hundred Brassard when finishing in the top 100 competitors of the President's Hundred Match. Also, sailors can earn and wear the U.S. Marine Corps's Annual Rifle Squad Combat Practice Competition Badge when competing as part of a Marine Rifle Squad—this badge is typically awarded to Navy Corpsman assigned to Marine infantry units. The following Marksmanship Competition Badges are currently awarded and authorized by the U.S. Navy (in order of precedence):

- U.S. Distinguished International Shooter Badge
- Distinguished Marksman Badge
- Distinguished Pistol Shot Badge
- National Trophy Match Excellence-in-Competition (EIC) Rifle Badge (Gold)
- National Trophy Match EIC Pistol Badge (Gold)
- Interservice/Navy EIC Rifleman Badge (Gold)
- Interservice/Navy EIC Pistol Badge (Gold)
- Annual Rifle Squad Combat Practice Competition Badge (Gold) (a USMC badge)
- Fleet EIC Rifle Badge (Gold)
- Fleet EIC Pistol Badge (Gold)
- National Trophy Match EIC Rifle Badge (Silver)
- National Trophy Match EIC Pistol Badge (Silver)
- Interservice/Navy EIC Rifleman Badge (Silver)
- Interservice/Navy EIC Pistol Badge (Silver)
- Annual Rifle Squad Combat Practice Competition Badge (Silver)
- Fleet EIC Rifle Badge (Silver)
- Fleet EIC Pistol Badge (Silver)
- National Trophy Match EIC Rifle Badge (Bronze)
- National Trophy Match EIC Pistol Badge (Bronze)
- Interservice/Navy EIC Rifleman Badge (Bronze)
- Interservice/Navy EIC Pistol Badge (Bronze)
- Annual Rifle Squad Combat Practice Competition Badge (Bronze)
- Fleet EIC Rifle Badge (Bronze)
- Fleet EIC Pistol Badge (Bronze)
- President's Hundred Brassard (enlisted only)

Note: The basic design of the Navy's EIC Badge is the same regardless of the level of competition where the badge was earned. To help distinguish one EIC badge from another, the word "NATIONAL" or "FLEET" is embossed above the word "RIFLEMAN" or "PISTOL SHOT"; only the Interservice/Navy EIC Badges will lack any markings above the weapon designation.

== See also ==
- List of United States Navy enlisted warfare designations
- Military badges of the United States
- Identification badges of the United States military
- Obsolete badges of the United States military
- Uniforms of the United States Navy
- List of United States Navy ratings
- United States Navy staff corps
