= Career Counselor Badge =

Military badge of the US Army and Navy

The Career Counselor Badge is a military badge of the United States Army and Navy which was first established in the early 1970s. The badge recognizes those enlisted personnel (warrant officers and commissioned officers are only permitted to wear the badge if they were awarded it during enlisted service) who have been selected as promotion and career advancement coordinators, and "retention NCOs" in the Army. The Navy and Army are the only branches of service to bestow a Career Counselor Badge.

== Army ==
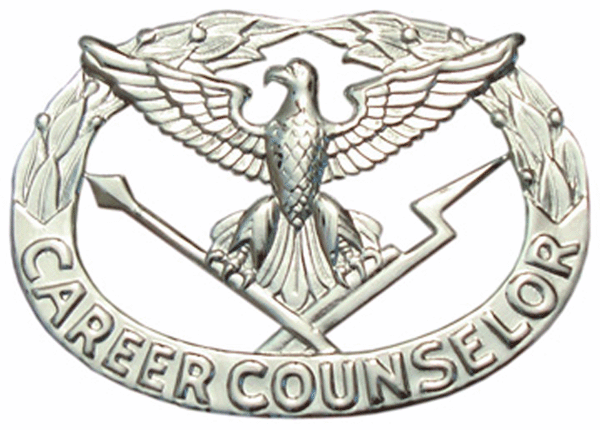
Army Career Counselor Badge

The Army Career Counselor Badge is authorized for wear by enlisted service members who hold the Military Occupational Specialty (MOS's) of “79S, 79T or 79V”, that of Career Counselor. The badge is presented as an Army Identification Badge to all graduates of the nine-week Army Career Counselor Course conducted at Ft Knox, KY, who subsequently are assigned as Career Counselors or Reenlistment Advisors, in the case of the National Guard. After a twelve month probationary period, the Career Counselor Badge is authorized for permanent wear providing that service as a Career Counselor was satisfactory and free from disciplinary action or removal for cause. The badge is worn on the right side of the uniform.

The Army Career Counselor Badge is retroactive to January 1972 and may be awarded for past service upon application from the service member. The badge may also be worn by officers, if they held an MOS as Career Counselor during enlisted service.

The Army Career Counselor Badge was awarded to Soldier's upon completion of training for the Military Occupational Specialty of 00R with the Army's Recruiting and Retention School located at Fort Benjamin Harrison, IN. Military Occupational Specialty 00R was a combined specialty consisting of Recruiters and Career Counselors, the badge awarded by the Commandant was determined by which training track of the occupational specialty the Soldier completed. In 1993 Military Occupational Specialty 00R was split to 79R for Recruiters, 79S for Active Duty Career Counselors, 79V for U.S. Army Reserve Career Counselors, and 79T for Army National Guard Career Counselors.

== Navy ==
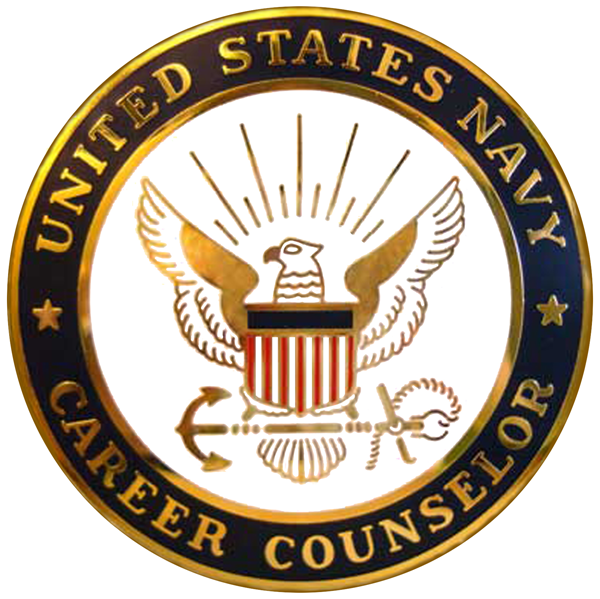
Navy Career Counselor Badge

The Navy Career Counselor Badge is a temporary insignia which is presented by local commands to those personnel, E-5 or above, who have been assigned as the Command Career Counselor. Personnel assigned to such duties must have completed appropriate Navy schooling and hold a Navy Enlisted Classification (NEC) as a Career Counselor or be in the Navy Counselor (NC) rating. Personnel that are E-5 may apply to enter the Navy Counselor (Career) rating once they are available to take First Class Petty Officer exam, but even Navy Counselors may only wear this badge when actually serving as a Command Career Counselor.

The badge may also be worn by commanding officers and executive officers at the discretion of the commanding officer, and by officers designated full-time retention officers on the staffs of the Chief of Naval Operations, fleet commanders-in-chief, and type commanders. In actual practice some Commanding Officers have required all Lieutenant Commanders and/or department heads in a command to wear this badge in their capacity as counselors to junior officers, while other commands have required its wear by all officers serving as an Officer-in-Charge of a deployed detachment.

The Navy Career Counselor Badge may only be worn while actually serving as a Career Counselor (or in another authorized billet as noted above); however, there have been cases where the award has been entered in service records as a permanent insignia. This is usually the case for Career Counselors of the larger or higher echelon Navy commands, where such permanent bestowal of the Career Counselor Badge was authorized by a senior officer O-6 or above.

The Navy Career Counselor Badge is typically worn either attached directly to a uniform or suspended on a leather backing from a pocket button. This second method is actually in violation of Navy uniform regulations; however, a flexible view of uniform regulations is relatively common in certain Navy commands.

== See also ==
- Badges of the United States Army
- Badges of the United States Navy
- Obsolete badges of the United States military
- Uniforms of the United States Army
- Uniforms of the United States Navy
