= Enlisted Aviation Warfare Specialist insignia =

US Navy badge

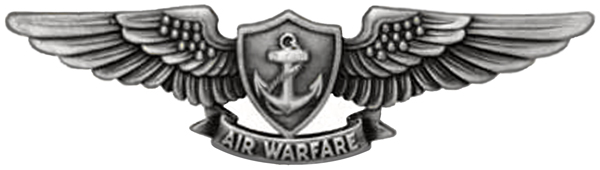
Enlisted Aviation Warfare Specialist

The Enlisted Aviation Warfare Specialist (EAWS) insignia is a military badge of the United States Navy which was created on 19 March 1980. The insignia recognizes those members of the Navy's enlisted force who have acquired the specific professional skills, knowledge, and military experience that result in qualification for service in the aviation activities of the Navy. This includes most personnel who are trained flight deck personnel onboard aircraft carriers, or maintenance personnel at an Aircraft Intermediate Maintenance Detachment or Department (AIMD) or aircraft squadron.

== Description ==
The award is a silver-colored metal pin in the form of wings with a central shield device depicting an anchor. At the bottom of the insignia a scroll holds the letting "AIR WARFARE".

== Prerequisite for EAWS ==
The basic prerequisite for the EAWS insignia is that a service member be assigned in a sea-duty status to a deployable naval aviation unit or aviation-capable ship. Most service members earning this insignia hold an enlisted rating designated in aviation (though a non-aviation rating is still eligible), or a support rating; in the 21st century Navy the ratings that are eligible include:

- AB: Aviation Boatswain's Mate
- AC: Air Traffic Controller
- AD: Aviation Machinist's Mate
- AE: Aviation Electrician's Mate
- AG: Aerographer's Mate
- AM: Aviation Structural Mechanic
- AME: Aviation Structural Mechanic Safety Equipmentman
- AO: Aviation Ordnanceman
- AS: Aviation Support Equipment Technician
- AT: Aviation Electronics Technician
- AWF: Naval Aircrewman (Mechanical)
- AWO: Naval Aircrewman (Operator)
- AWR: Naval Aircrewman (Tactical)
- AWS: Naval Aircrewman (Helicopter)
- AWV: Naval Aircrewman (Avionics)
- AZ: Aviation Maintenance Administrationman
- BM: Boatswain’s Mate
- CS: Culinary Specialist
- CT: Cryptologic Technician
- EM: Electrician's Mate
- EMN: Electrician's Mate (Nuclear)
- ET: Electronics Technician
- ETN: Electronics Technician (Nuclear)
- FC: Fire Controlman
- GM: Gunner's Mate
- HM: Hospital Corpsman
- IC: Interior Communications Electrician
- LS: Logistics Specialist
- IS: Intelligence Specialist
- IT: Information Systems Technician
- MA: Master-At-Arms
- MC: Mass Communication Specialist
- MM: Machinist's Mate
- MMN: Machinist's Mate (Nuclear)
- MN: Mineman
- NC: Navy Counselor
- OS: Operations Specialist
- PR: Aircrew Survival Equipmentman
- PS: Personnel Specialist
- RS: Retail Services Specialist
- YN: Yeoman

The non-designated striker rates of Airman, Airman Apprentice, and Airman Recruit are also eligible to receive the EAWS insignia. However, due to the time involved in the qualification procedure, most service members obtain at least a Petty Officer Third Class rating before earning the EAWS insignia. Sailors outside the aviation community are eligible to attain EAWS designation; however they must first complete the warfare specialist qualification for their community.

== Qualification process ==
The qualification process to obtain the insignia begins with the Enlisted Aviation Personal Qualification Standards, also known as PQS. There are two PQS for the Enlisted Aviation Warfare Specialist insignia. The first is the Common Core which consists of concepts, policies, and tasks that are common throughout Naval aviation and provide a foundation for the Sailor's knowledge. The second is a platform-specific PQS which consists of several training tasks and other practical experience on-the-job exercises relevant to the particular aviation community the sailor is currently serving in, for example an F/A-18 squadron or an aircraft carrier (CVN). The entire Enlisted Aviation PQS normally takes approximately one year to complete from the point of entering the enlisted aviation community though it can be completed much earlier with much dedication and effort.

Those completing the Enlisted Aviation PQS must then pass a written examination and a review board conducted by senior enlisted aviation personnel, normally the rank of Chief Petty Officer or above. Upon passing both the examination and the oral board, the EAWS insignia may be presented. The Sailor is then authorized to add the Enlisted Aviation Warfare Specialist designator (AW) after his or her rate.

Upon transfer to the Sailor's next aviation command, he or she is required to complete an abbreviated re-qualification process to familiarize the Sailor with the differences between various aviation platforms. This process must be completed within 12 months of reporting aboard or the Sailor loses the right to wear the EAWS insignia.

The EAWS insignia is not required for continued advancement in the Navy, however for those in aviation rates the insignia must be obtained by three years as a Petty Officer Second Class. Those failing to obtain the insignia may be ineligible for advancement to Petty Officer First Class, reenlistment in their current rate or may be restricted to shore assignments.

The EAWS insignia is considered one of three primary warfare badges available to the Navy's enlisted force. The other two aforementioned badges are the Enlisted Submarine Warfare Badge and the Enlisted Surface Warfare Specialist Badge. The gold Aircrew Badge or Naval Aircrew Wings (NAC) are a similar badge available to select enlisted personnel of the U.S. Navy aviation community. NAC is authorized for personnel who have undergone extensive training in flight operations of naval aircraft. Such training includes weapons management, electronic warfare, and water survival. Contrary to most other services, naval aircrewmen do not receive their wings after aircrew school. Rather, they receive their wings only after completing their platform respective Personnel Qualification Standards (PQS) (roughly 1 year past the completion of training).

The Aircrew Badge is a separate badge from the EAWS Badge, and qualified service members are eligible to wear both badges simultaneously. Additionally the Fleet Marine Force (FMF) Insignia is reserved for Hospital Corpsmen, Religious Program Specialists, Logistics Specialists and Operations Specialists assigned to Fleet Marine Corps units. Sailors receiving this designator are authorized to wear it above any other designator while assigned to FMF units.

OPNAVINST 1414.9B is the Navy instruction that governs the Enlisted Warfare Qualification Programs.

== See also ==
- List of United States Navy enlisted warfare designations
- Badges of the United States Navy
- Uniforms of the United States Navy
