= Seabee combat warfare specialist insignia =

Warfare qualification of the United States Navy

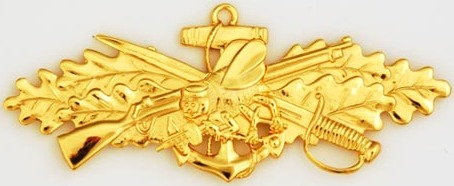
SCWS officer insignia

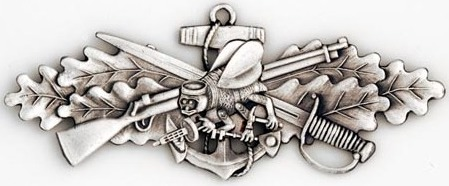
SCWS enlisted insignia

The Seabee Combat Warfare Specialist (SCWS) insignia is a warfare qualification of the United States Navy.

To be eligible to earn the SCWS insignia, personnel must first be assigned to a qualifying unit of the Naval Construction Force (Seabees) such as Naval Mobile Construction Battalions (NMCB), Underwater Construction Teams (UCT), and Construction Battalion Maintenance Units (CBMU), as well as personnel assigned to Amphibious Construction Battalions (ACB). As such, qualification is primarily earned by enlisted members of the Seabee Occupational Field ratings and members of the Civil Engineer Corps, however the insignia may be earned by any officer or enlisted member assigned to a qualifying unit having completed the prescribed requirements.

To be awarded the insignia, a service member must demonstrate superior proficiency in naval heritage, naval doctrine, command and control, hazardous material/hazardous waste environmental safety, supply & logistics, communications and communications security, weapons, general military tactics, contingency operations, embarkation, safety, basic first aid, civil engineer support equipment, and chemical, biological, and radiological warfare.

In addition to preparatory coursework, personnel are required to complete Personal Qualification Standards (PQS) common to all qualifying units as well as a PQS specific to the type unit assigned. Officers are required to complete an officer specific PQS in addition to all aspects of the enlisted program as well as demonstrate broad and deep knowledge proficiency commensurate with their increased responsibilities.

Upon completion of the above, members must meet career performance and physical fitness standards, participate in a field training exercise or actual operations, pass a written knowledge test, complete a preparatory oral knowledge board, and lastly pass a final comprehensive oral examination board.

The insignia is issued in two degrees: silver for enlisted personnel and gold for officers. The insignia features an armed Seabee, superimposed over a crossed sword and rifle (a Springfield M1903) atop oak leaves. On the officer's insignia the rifle is crossed with an officer's saber, while the enlisted insignia is crossed with a cutlass. The bee is also the insignia for the Navy Seabees as a whole.

The authorizing instruction, "Seabee Combat Warfare Specialist", OPNAVINST 1410.1, Department of the Navy, Office of the Chief of Naval Operations, Washington, DC 20350-2000, was released in March 1992. The design evolved over the coming months followed by approvals and production of the device. During the same period the initial applications for the insignia were prepared, reviewed and considered for approval.

An enlisted member who receives the SCWS insignia is authorized to place the designator (SCW) after his/her rating designator. For example, if Ralph Manzie is an SCW-qualified Construction Mechanic Senior Chief Petty Officer, then his written name would be CMCS (SCW) Ralph Manzie.

The first person to wear this insignia was its designer, Commander Ross S. Selvidge, CEC, USNR, at the Navy Reserve Center, Los Alamitos, CA, in March 1993.

== See also ==
- Badges of the United States Navy
- List of United States Navy enlisted warfare designations
- Obsolete badges of the United States military
- Seabees
- Uniforms of the United States Navy
