= List of United States Navy enlisted warfare designations =

The United States Navy enlisted warfare designations represent the achievement of a qualification and entitles the member to wear the associated insignia. When awarded in accordance with appropriate guidelines, enlisted sailors are authorized to place the designator in parentheses immediately after the member’s rate abbreviation, for example, MM1(SW) Smith, HM2(CAC) Jones. In cases of multiple designators, the designators are separated by a slash enclosed in parentheses, for example, MM1(SW/AW) Smith, HM2(FMF/CAC) Jones. Although commissioned officers have warfare pins and designations, such as Surface Warfare Officer, they do not use warfare designators in their titles.

== Aviation community ==
- (AW) - Aviation Warfare Specialist
- (CAC) - Marine Combat Aircrew
- (NAC) - Naval Aircrew Warfare Specialist

== Surface Warfare community ==
- (SW) - Surface Warfare Specialist

== Undersea Warfare community ==
- (SS) - Submarine Warfare Specialist (or "Qualified Submarine Specialist")
- (SU) - "In training for submarine qualifications"
- (SQ) - "Qualified in submarines, but not planned for future assignment to submarine duty."
- (SG) - "Qualified in submarines, but not in submarine source rating; not detailed by the submarine community."
- (SP) - "Previously assigned in submarines; assigned only to those personnel disqualified for submarine duty and serving in a submarine support billet; detailed by the submarine community, but not to be reassigned to submarine duty without prior approval of NAVPERSCOM."
- (IUSS) - Integrated Undersea Surveillance System Specialist
- (DSI) - Deep Submergence Insignia

== Marine Corps support community ==
- (CAC) - Marine Combat Aircrew
- (FMF) - Fleet Marine Force Warfare Specialist

== Parachutist community ==
- (PJ) - Basic Parachutist or Navy and Marine Corps Parachutist
- (FPJ) - Free Fall Parachutist

== Special Operations community ==
- (DV) - Diver - applies to personnel with Navy Enlisted Classifications:

5311 - Saturation Diver
5342/5931 - Diver First Class
5343/5932 - Diver Second Class
5345 - SCUBA Diver
HM-8493 - Medical Deep Sea Diving Technician
HM-8494 - Deep Sea Diving Independent Duty Corpsman

- (MCD) - Marine Combatant Diver - applies to personnel with Navy Enlisted Classifications:

HM-8403 - Fleet Marine Force Reconnaissance Independent Duty Corpsman
HM-8427 - Fleet Marine Force Reconnaissance Corpsman

- (MDV) - Master Diver - applies to personnel with Navy Enlisted Classifications:

5341/5933 - Master Diver
5346 - Master Saturation Diver

- (DSW) - Diving Salvage Warfare Specialist
- (EWS) - Explosive Ordnance Disposal Warfare Specialist
- (EOD) - no longer used; see (EWS)

== Special Warfare community ==
- (SEAL) - Naval Special Warfare Specialist; a designator for Special Warfare Operator (SO) rating
- (SWCC) - Special Warfare Combatant-craft Crewmen; a designator for Special Warfare Boat Operator (SB) rating

== Expeditionary Warfare community ==
- (EXW) - Expeditionary Warfare Specialist

== Construction community ==
- (SCW) - Seabee Combat Warfare Specialist
- (EXW) - Expeditionary Warfare Specialist

== Information Warfare community ==
- (IW) - Information Warfare Specialist

IDW was updated to IW in July 2016.

== See also ==
- United States Navy enlisted rate insignia
- List of United States Navy ratings
- Uniforms of the United States Navy
- Badges of the United States Navy
- List of Naval Officer Designators
- United States Navy officer rank insignia
- List of United States Navy staff corps (insignia)
- Navy Enlisted Classification
