= Uniforms of the United States Navy =

Clothes worn by members of the United States Navy

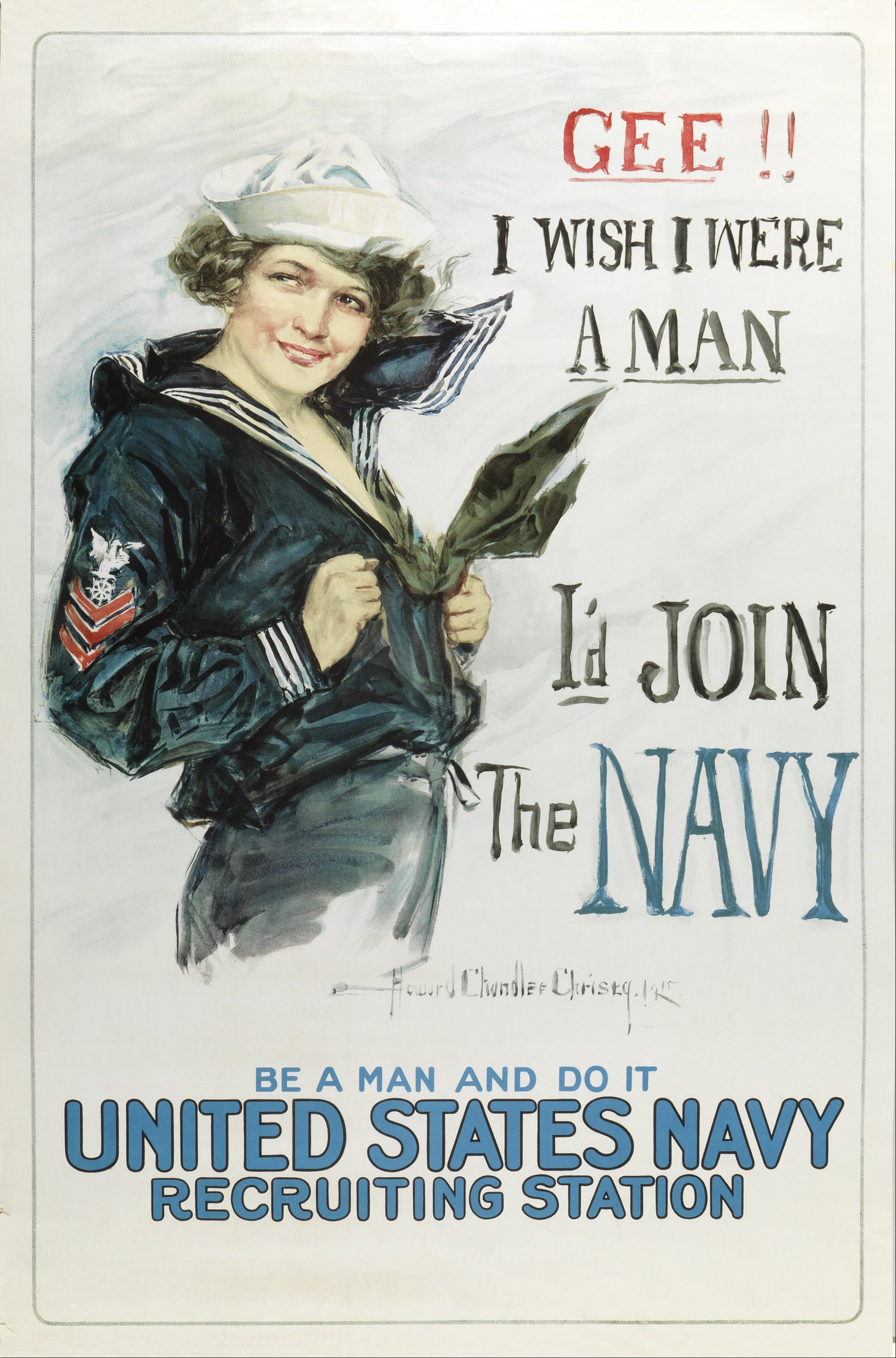
1917 recruiting poster for the United States Navy by Howard Chandler Christy, featuring a woman wearing the most widely recognized uniform, the enlisted dress blues.

The uniforms of the United States Navy include dress uniforms, daily service uniforms, working uniforms, and uniforms for special situations, which have varied throughout the history of the navy. For simplicity in this article, officers refers to both commissioned officers and warrant officers.

== Dress uniforms ==
The United States Navy has three categories of dress uniforms, from least to most formal: service, full, and dinner dress.

=== Service dress ===
Service dress uniforms are worn for official functions not rising to the level of full or dinner dress. They are also commonly worn when traveling in official capacity, or when reporting to a command. The civilian equivalent is a business suit. Service Dress Blue may be worn year-round, while Service Dress White is reserved for summer or tropical zones. Ribbons are worn over the left breast pocket in all variations of the service dress uniform.

==== Officers and chief petty officers ====
===== Service Dress Blue =====
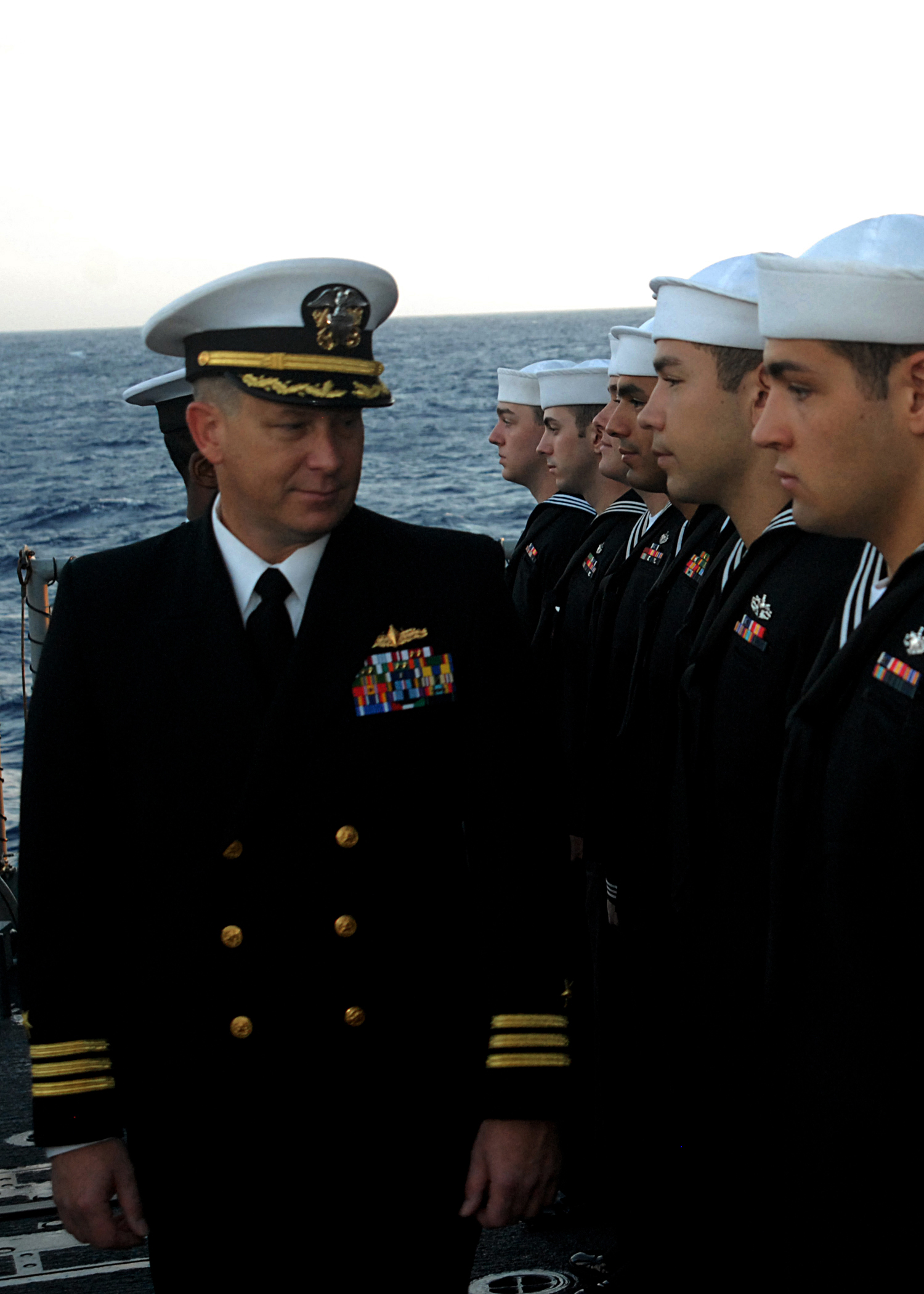
An officer inspects enlisted sailors in Service Dress Blue (2008)

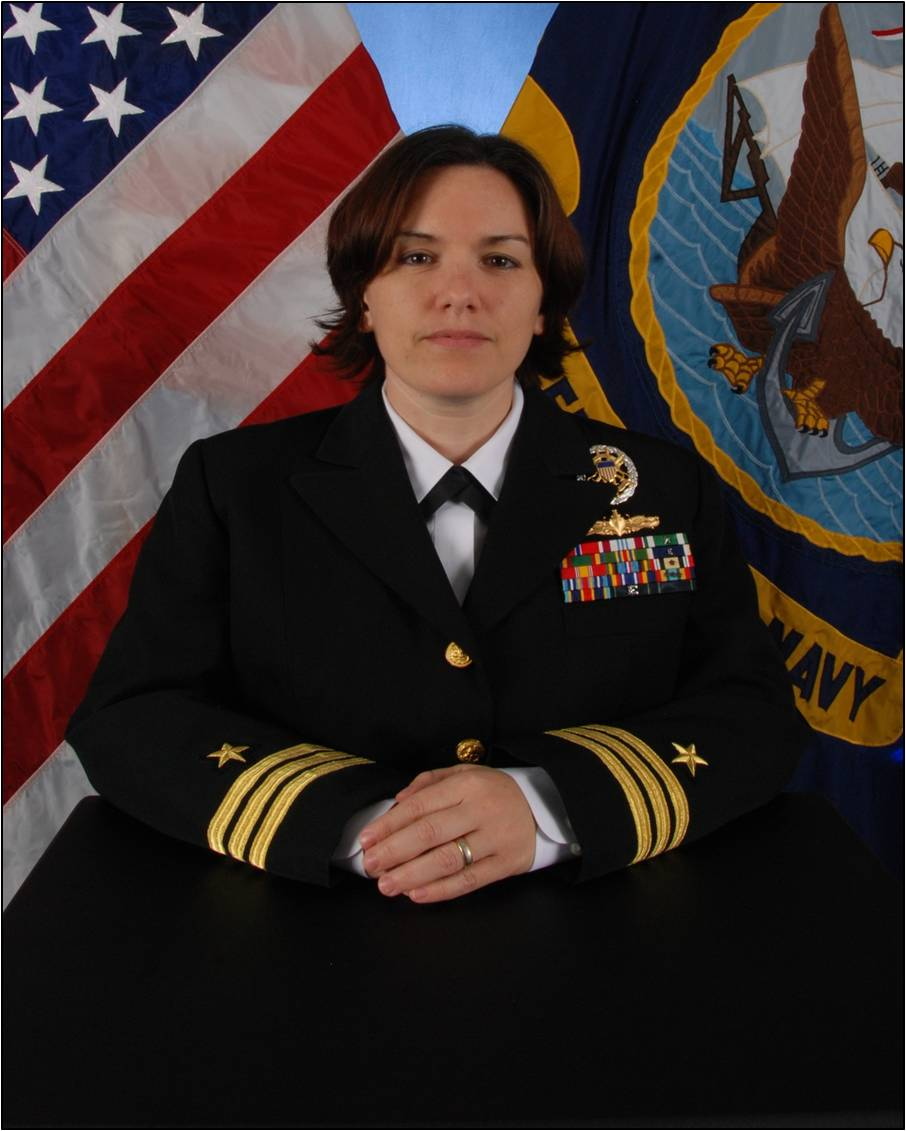
A female U.S. Navy officer in Service Dress Blue uniform (2012)

The Service Dress Blue (SDB) uniform consists of a dark navy blue suit coat and trousers (or optional skirt for women) that are nearly black in color, a white shirt, and a black four-in-hand necktie for men or a neck tab for women. The material is generally wool or a wool blend, depending on the vendor. The men's jacket is double-breasted with six gold-colored buttons, and the women's jacket single breasted with a single row of four gold-colored buttons. Rank insignia are gold sleeve stripes for commissioned officers, while rating badges and service stripes are worn on the left sleeve by chief petty officers (CPOs). The prescribed headgear is a white combination cap, although a navy blue garrison cap is optional in some situations when the jacket is not worn, unless stated otherwise by the prescribing authority. In 2016 the Navy phased out the distinct female combination cap and now prescribes a unisex combination cap for female officers and CPOs; the prior female version is optional as of 2024. Commissioned and warrant officers wear a cap badge of the U.S. shield and eagle in silver upon gold crossed anchors, while CPOs wear a single anchor with the letters "USN" emblazoned over the middle in silver (SCPOs and MCPOs have the corresponding silver stars above the anchor) and midshipmen wear a fouled anchor. The combination cap's chinstrap is gold for commissioned and warrant officers, narrower gold for midshipmen, and black for CPOs. Females typically wear beltless slacks with the SDB, although since January 2017, belted slacks can be worn as an alternative.

===== Service Dress White =====
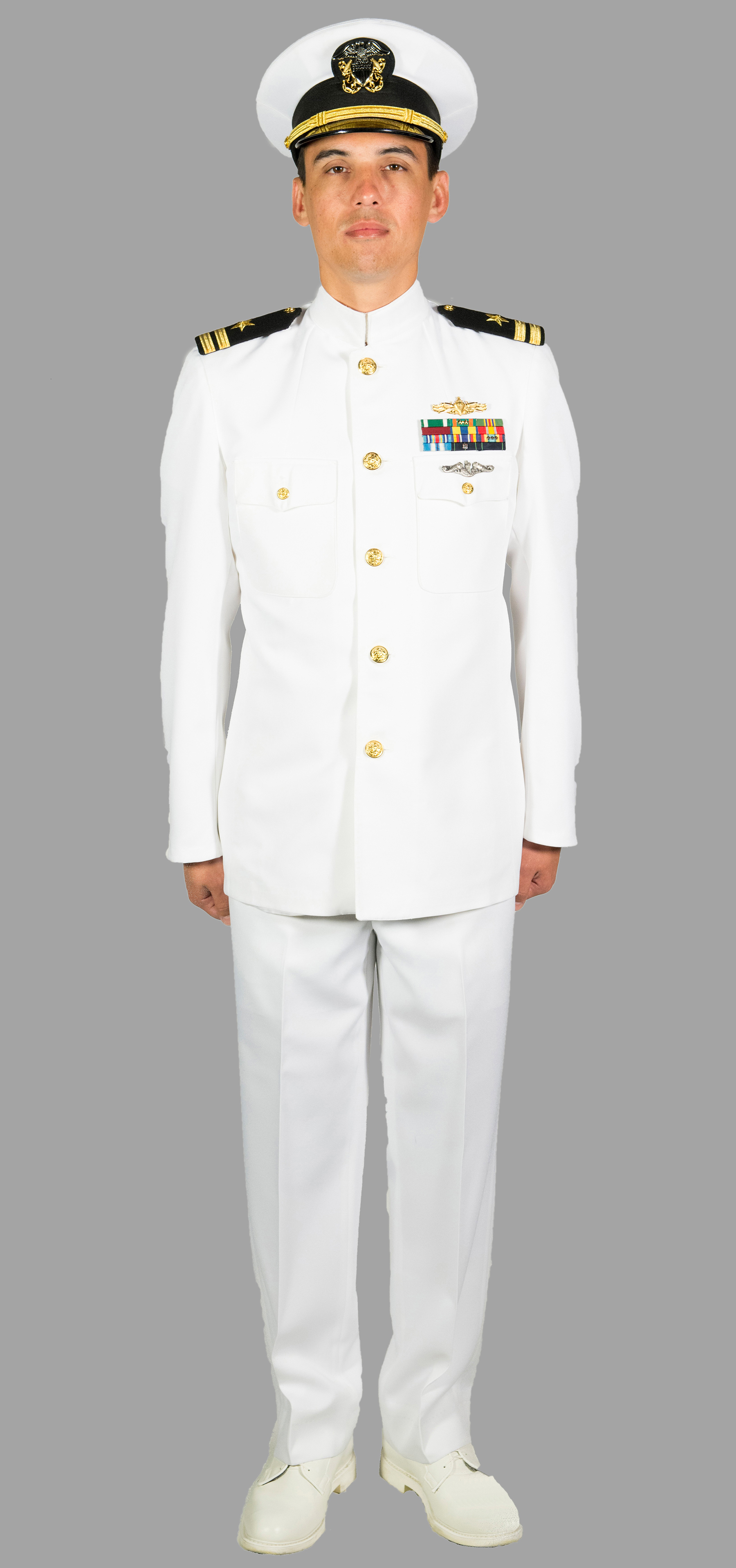
A lieutenant models the Service Dress White uniform (2015)

The Service Dress White uniform was different for men and women until 2017. Men wear a high stand-collared white tunic, with shoulder boards for officers or metal anchor collar devices for CPOs, white trousers, and white shoes. This uniform is informally called "chokers" due to the standing collar. The material, formerly cotton, today is a weave of polyester known as "Certified Navy Twill". The white combination cap is the prescribed headgear.

Women previously wore a uniform similar to the Service Dress Blue uniform but with a white coat and skirt or trousers. Officer's rank insignia consisted of lacing on the sleeves in the same manner as on the blue uniform, while CPOs wore rank insignia pins on the lapels of the jacket. However, women's uniforms were changed to resemble men's uniforms: female officers and CPOs began wearing stand-collared tunics similar to the male uniform in early 2017, with full replacement of the old-style uniform by the end of January 2020.

==== Junior enlisted sailors ====
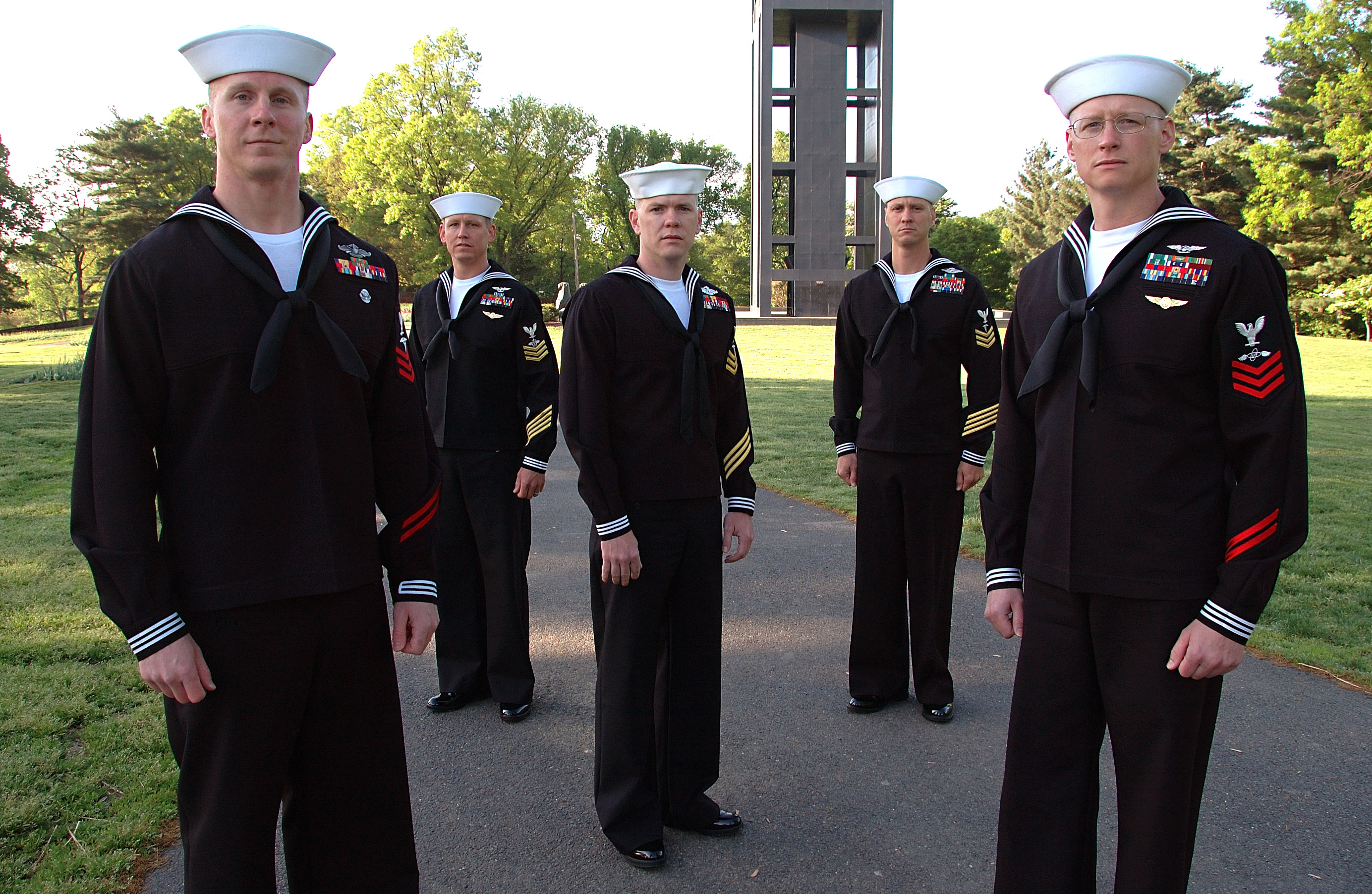
Petty officers in 2006 wearing service dress blue uniforms displaying both red and gold rating badges and service stripes.

Service Dress Blues for male junior enlisted sailors are based on the classic sailor suit in navy blue, colloquially referred to as "crackerjacks" because of the sailor-suited figure that adorns the packaging of Cracker Jack snacks. It consists of a navy blue wool pullover jumper with an elongated "tar-flap" collar adorned with three rows of white stripes and two white stars, one at each corner of the collar. The jumper's cuffs are similarly adorned with white stripes. A black silk or synthetic fiber neckerchief, rolled diagonally, is worn around the neck, under the collar, with the ends tied in a square knot in the center of the chest. The trousers for the uniform are flared as "bell bottoms". The trousers have traditionally featured a broad-fall opening, though changes to the trousers announced in 2012 have added a zippered fly, rendering the buttons merely decorative. A traditional white "Dixie cup" hat is also worn, as well as black leather shoes.

For a brief period in the 1970s and early 1980s, male enlisted sailors in paygrades E-1 to E-6 wore a double-breasted blue uniform based on the version worn by officers and CPOs, but with grey buttons and a combination cap with an emblem consisting of a silver eagle and the letters "USN".

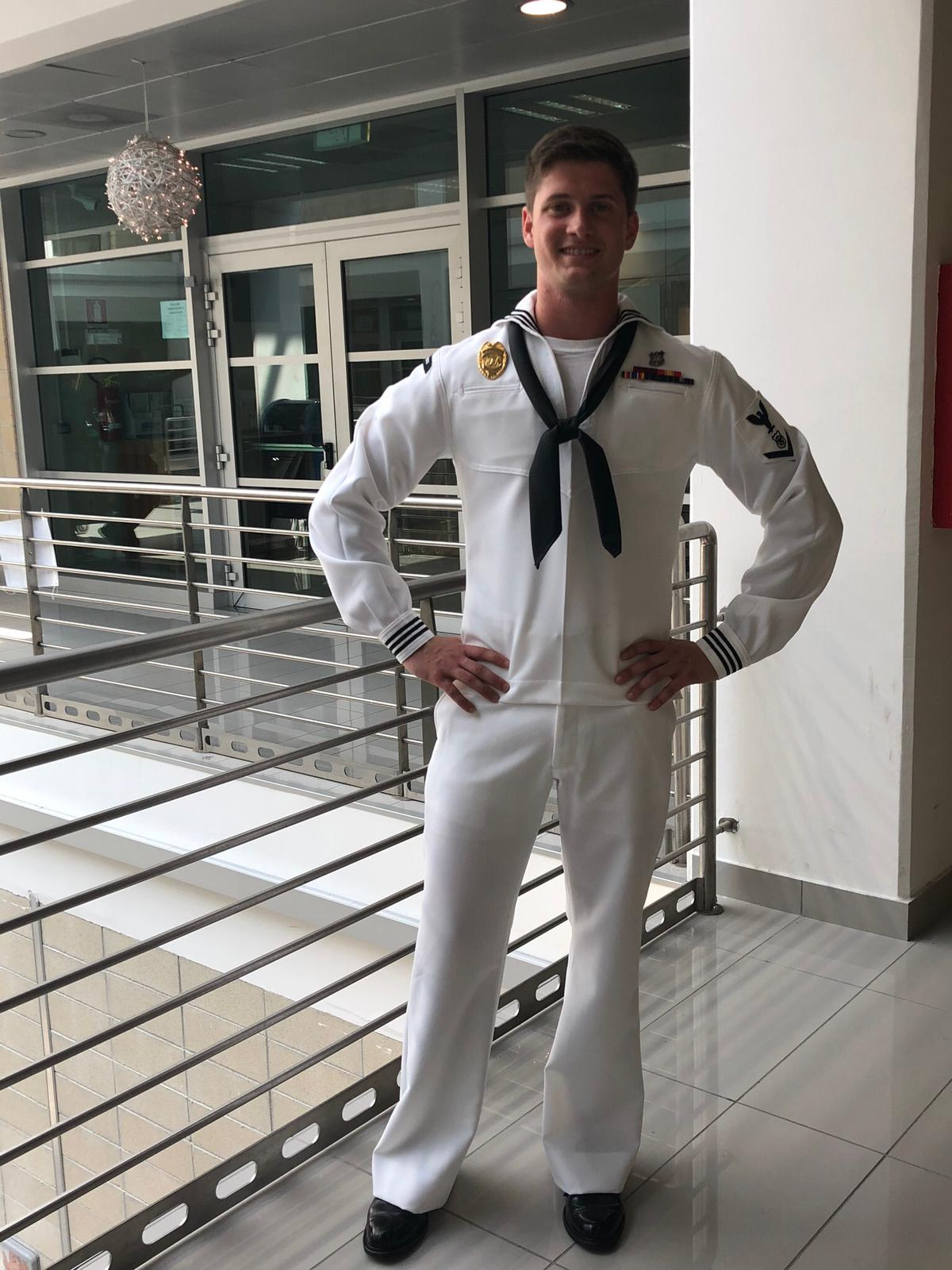
A US Navy Master-at-Arms third class in dress white uniform (2018)

The female junior enlisted sailors' Service Dress Blue uniform was formerly similar to the short-lived male uniform from the 1970s. This uniform was phased out and was replaced by a female-cut variant of the "crackerjacks" with the transition begun in October 2016 and completed by the end of January 2020 (delayed from its initial date of December 2019).

Until 2016, the junior enlisted Service Dress White uniform, for both sexes, consisted of a white jumper with plain collar, white bell-bottom trousers with a fly front (or optional skirt for women), black leather shoes, the black neckerchief worn in the same fashion as with the Service Dress Blue uniform. Males wore the white "Dixie cup" cap, while females wore the same cap as their Service Dress Blue uniforms. That Service Dress White jumper was actually derived from the former Undress White, with its wide cuff-less sleeves and no piping. However, beginning in October 2015, Service Dress White jumpers were changed to feature navy blue piping on cuffed sleeves, stars and navy blue piping on the collar, and a yoke, making it a 'photo-negative' of the Service Dress Blue jumper.

Ribbons are worn with these uniforms over the top left pocket opening, along with qualification or warfare insignia. Either the all-weather coat or peacoat may be worn with this uniform in cold or inclement weather. The color of the enlisted rate insignia and service stripes for the Service Dress Blues is either red or gold based upon how many years the wearer has served (prior to 2019 it was contingent on disciplinary history); the colors on the Service Dress Whites are always black.

=== Full dress ===
Full Dress uniforms are worn for ceremonies such as changes of command, retirements, commissionings and decommissionings, funerals, weddings, or when otherwise appropriate. Full Dress is similar to Service Dress except that instead of ribbons, full-size medals are worn above the left breast pocket, with ribbons worn on the opposite side for decorations without corresponding medals. Ceremonial swords or cutlasses are authorized for wear by officers and chief petty officers, and may be required for lieutenant commander and above.

For the Ceremonial Guard in Washington, D.C., the junior enlisted Full Dress uniforms are further modified with the wearing of a white pistol belt, ascot, and dress aiguillette (the latter two are white for winter and navy blue for summer), and white canvas leggings. Other honor guards are only authorized leggings and white pistol belt.

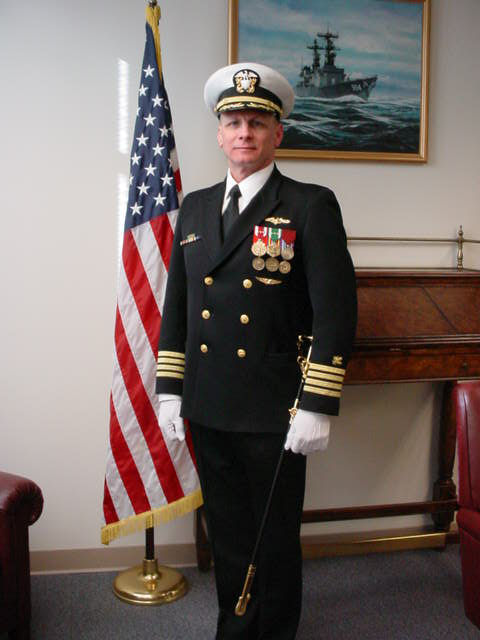
A navy captain's "Full Dress Blue Uniform" with full-sized medals, white gloves and sword (2007)

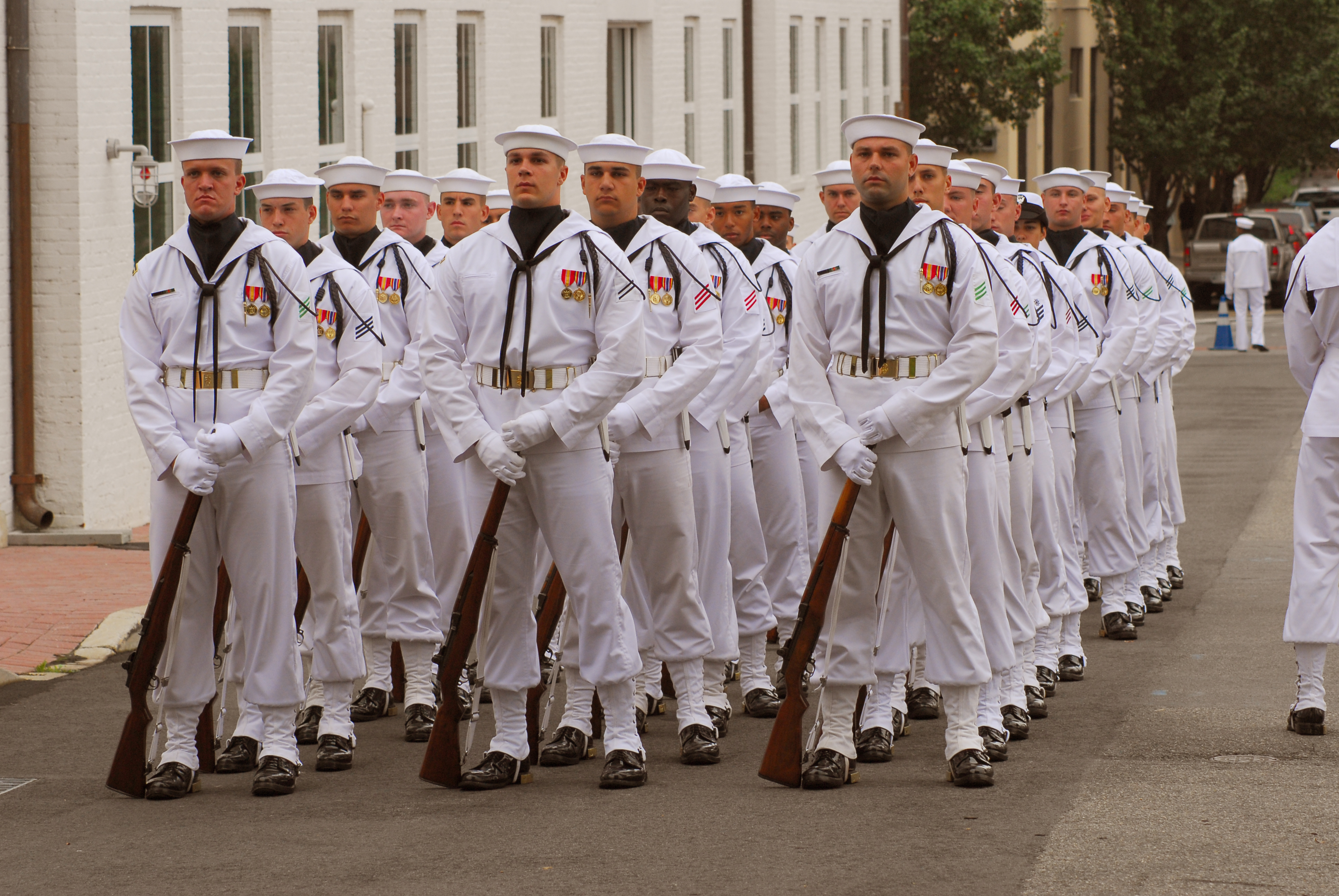
Enlisted Full Dress Whites worn at a Change of Command Ceremony in 2009. This is the older-style version that was replaced in 2021; it lacks the blue piping and stars

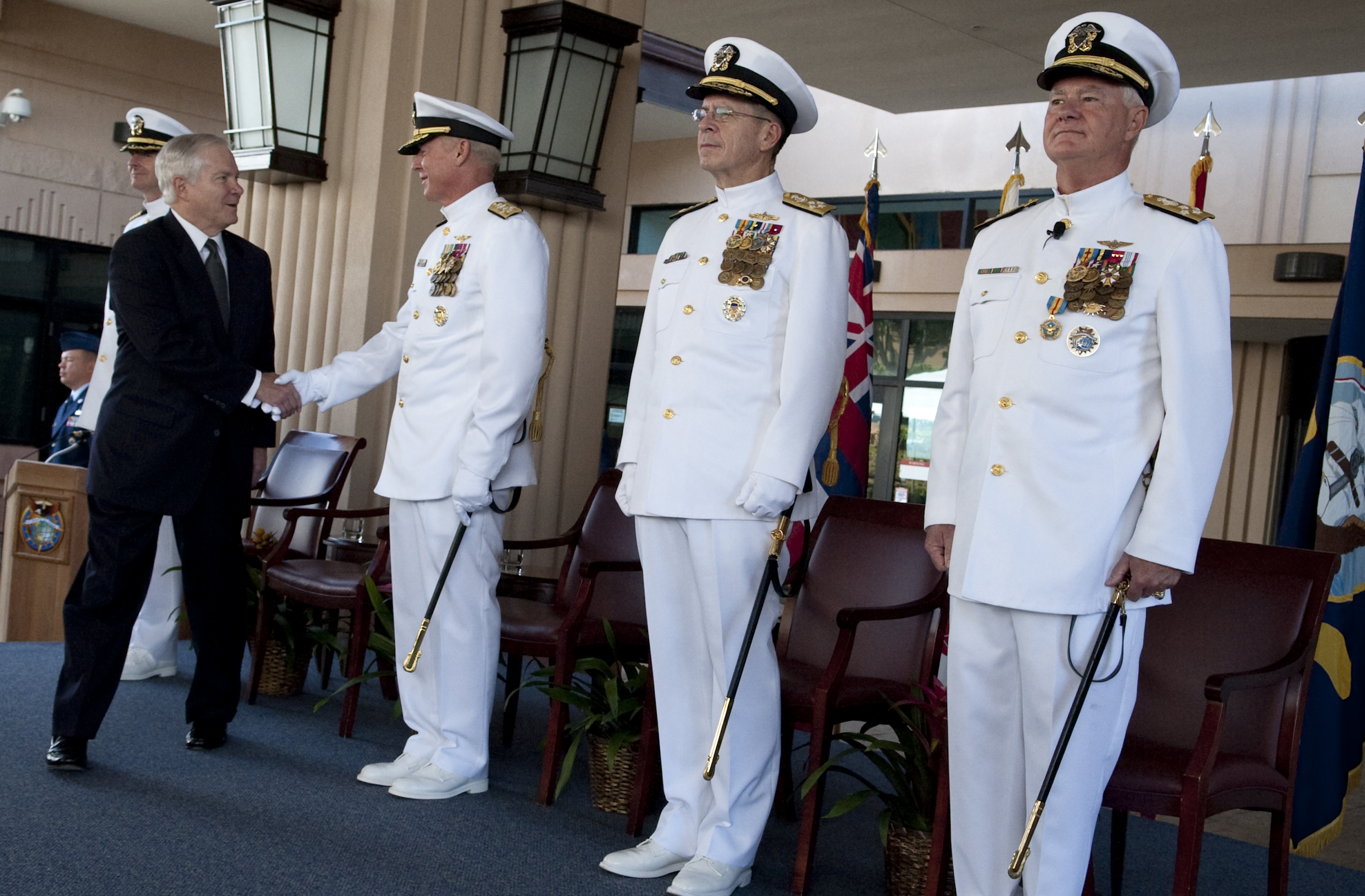
Navy officers in full dress white uniform at the PACOM change-of-command ceremony, Camp Smith, Hawaii, Oct. 19, 2009.

=== Dinner dress ===
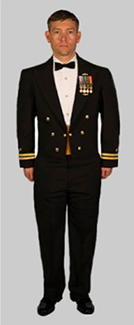
A Navy officer in blue mess dress (2017)

The dinner dress uniforms of the United States Navy are the most formal and have the most variations. For officers, there are Dinner Dress Blue and Dinner Dress White, Dinner Dress Blue Jacket and Dinner Dress White Jacket, and Formal Dress. Although trousers are authorized, women frequently wear the appropriate color skirt.

Dinner Dress Blue and White are identical to their Service Dress versions, but worn with miniature medals and badges with no ribbons. Dinner Dress Blue is additionally worn with a dress shirt and black bow tie. These variants are commonly worn by many junior officers and enlisted personnel as substitutes for the more formal Dinner Dress Jacket variant which is only prescribable for lieutenant commander and above and optional for lieutenant and below.

The Dinner Dress Blue/White Jacket uniforms feature a short mess jacket with three buttons on each side, worn open with a black bow tie and gold cummerbund (women substitute a neck tab for the bow tie). Male officers show rank stripes on the sleeves of the jacket for the blue version and on shoulder boards for the white version, while women officers only wear sleeve stripes. This uniform is equivalent to black tie in usage.

The Formal Dress variation is the most formal and is identical to the Dinner Dress Blue Jacket uniform but worn with a white waistcoat with gold buttons in place of the cummerbund, a white bow tie, and matching mother-of-pearl studs and cuff links. Though rarely used, men can also substitute a tailcoat for the standard dinner dress jacket with this uniform. The female version is substantially the same as Dinner Dress Blue Jacket, but substitutes the mother-of-pearl studs and cuff links for gold. This uniform is equivalent to white tie in usage. This uniform is only prescribed for officers and chiefs.

Headgear is not required for dinner dress uniforms unless an outer jacket is worn.

Those holding the rank of lieutenant and below have the option of using the Dinner Dress uniform when Dinner Dress Jacket is prescribed. The enlisted sailors who are chief petty officer and above wear a uniform similar to the officers, but with rank insignia and service stripes on the left sleeve. While enlisted who are petty officer first class and below have optional Dinner Dress Jacket uniforms similar to the officers and chiefs, they may also wear their Dinner Dress uniform, which is the traditional Service Dress "sailor suit", with miniature medals instead of ribbons.

== Service uniforms ==
Service uniforms are the U.S. Navy's daily wear uniforms, and exist in several variations. They are intended for use in office environments, in positions that interact with the public, and in watch situations. Skirts are authorized for women in all service uniforms.

=== Officers and chief petty officers ===
==== Service Khaki ====
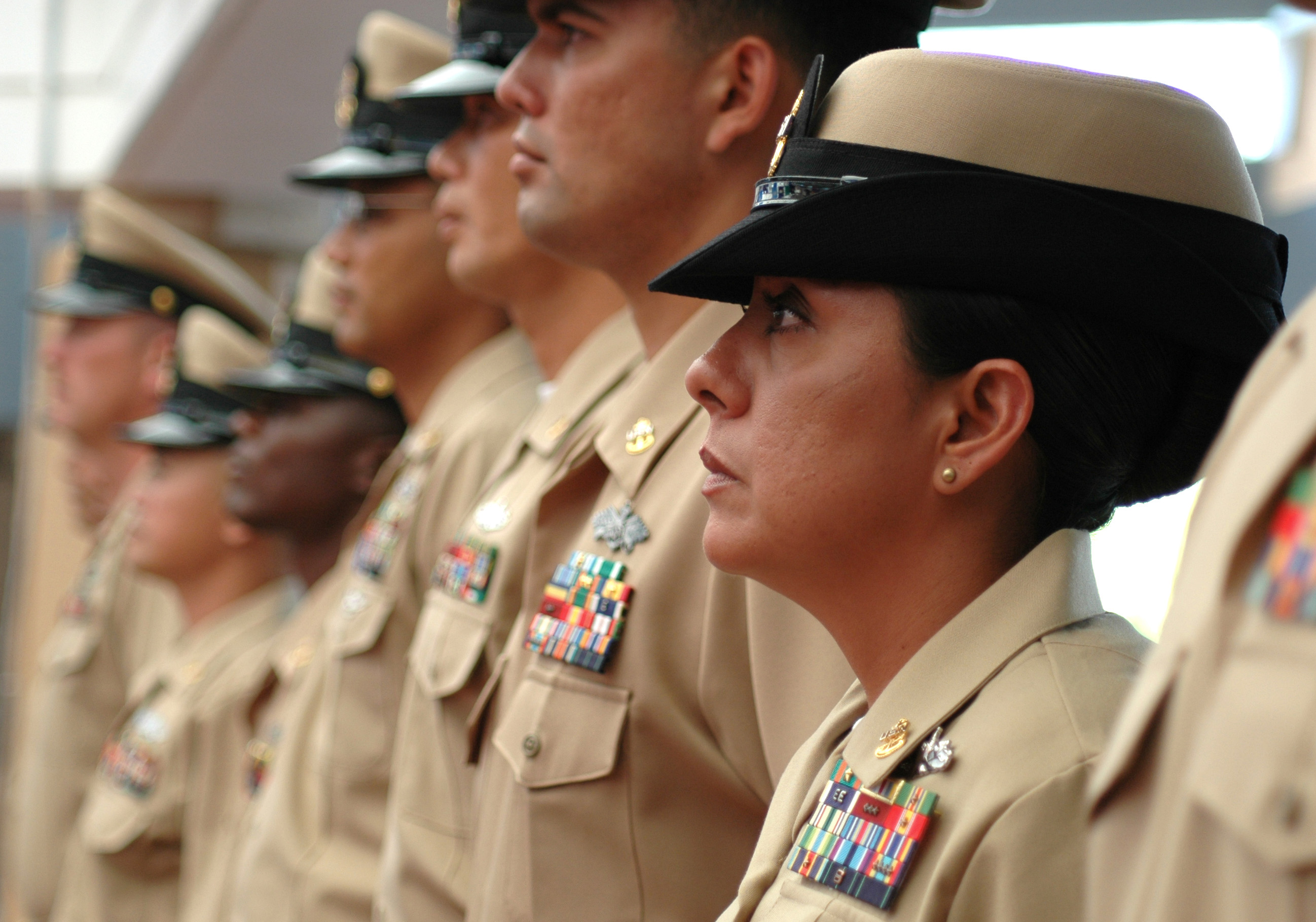
U.S. Navy chief petty officers wearing the Service Khaki uniforms with the female "bucket-styled" combination caps in September 2006.

The Navy first authorized a khaki uniform in 1913 as a practical garment for early naval aviators; they were given permission to wear Marine Corps khaki uniforms with naval insignia when flying or working on aircraft. Khakis were authorized aboard submarines in 1931 and as an officer's working uniform on all ships in 1941.

The Service Khaki uniform today is reserved for officers and enlisted sailors at chief petty officer and above. Colloquially referred to as "Peanut Butters" (due to the color), it is a short-sleeved khaki button-up shirt and matching trousers, worn with a gold belt buckle. The shirt features two front flap pockets and an open collar. Ribbons are worn above the left pocket of the shirt, with the warfare insignia above them. A nametag may be worn above the right pocket, and rank insignia is worn on the collar. The regulations for ribbons state the highest three awards, or all ribbons can be worn at once. Headgear consists of either a combination cap with a khaki cover or a khaki garrison cap. Currently black and brown oxford shoes are authorized for all officers and CPOs, though traditionally brown shoes are worn only by aviators. Females are authorized to wear the same over-blouse as junior enlisted sailors. The uniform is also worn by cadet officers and cadet chief petty officers in the Navy Junior ROTC.

==== Summer White ====
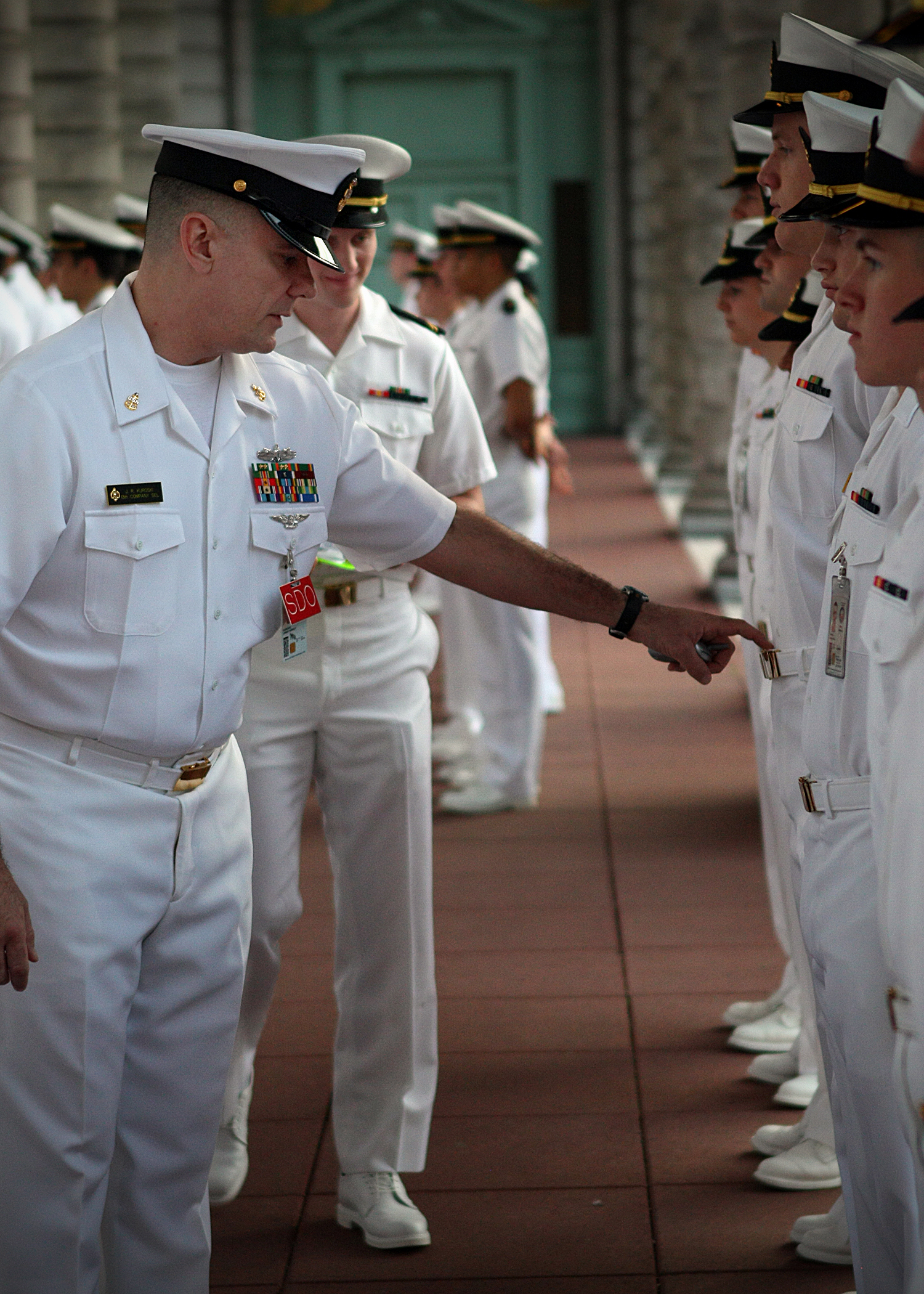
U.S. Naval Academy Midshipman being inspected wearing Summer Whites (2010)

The Summer White uniform (formerly known as Tropical White Long and nicknamed the "milkman" and "Good Humor" uniform) consists of a short-sleeved, open-collared white button-up shirt, white trousers and belt, and white dress shoes. Authorized headwear is the combination cap. Officers wear shoulder boards with this uniform, while CPOs wear metal collar insignia. The women's shirt for all ranks has shoulder straps, but carry nothing except for shoulder boards worn by officers. The Summer White uniform is made of Certified Navy Twill. While once authorized for junior enlisted, it is now restricted to officers and chiefs. Members E-6 and below previously wore a short-sleeved Summer White uniform with rate insignia on the left sleeve, but the uniform was discontinued by the Navy in December 2010.

=== Junior enlisted ===
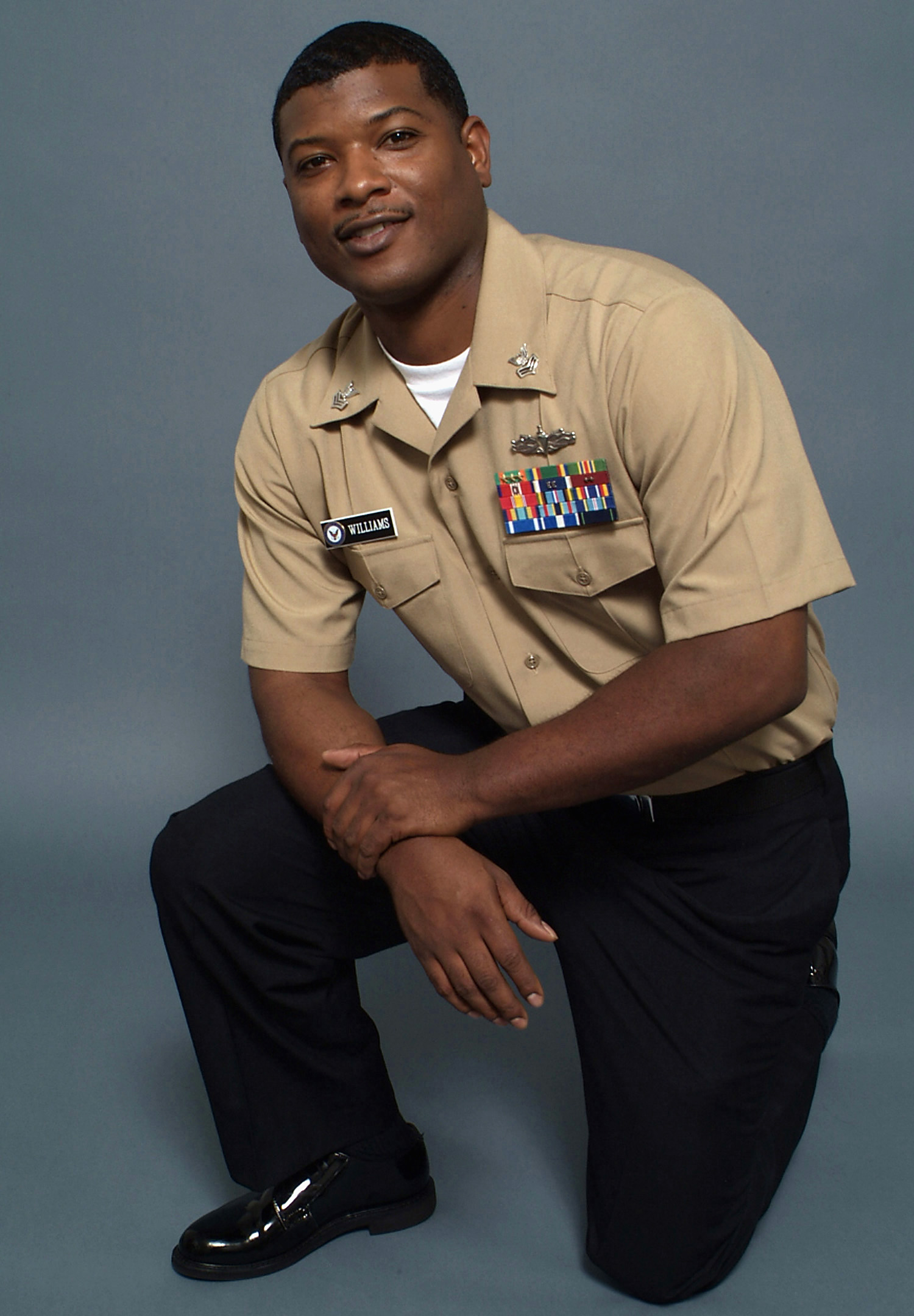
The Navy Service Uniform for junior enlisted sailors (2008)

==== Navy Service Uniform ====
The U.S. Navy underwent a comprehensive review of every uniform from 2004 through 2007, intending to replace the different working uniform for all hands and the seasonal service uniforms with a single year-round service uniform for junior enlisted personnel below chief petty officer. The Navy Service Uniform has replaced the Winter Blue Uniform and Summer White Uniform (both discussed below), which were phased out on 31 December 2010 when the rollout of the new service uniform was completed. Enlisted personnel now have a single Service Uniform. Navy Junior ROTC units also received this new uniform, where, unlike in the U.S. Navy proper, it is worn by both cadet officers and enlisted cadets.

The Navy Service Uniform is a year-round service uniform to withstand day-to-day classroom and office-like environments where the service uniform is typically worn. It consists of a short-sleeve khaki shirt for males and a khaki weskit-style blouse for females, made from a wash and wear 75% polyester, 25% wool blend, with permanent military creases. Males wear black trousers with a belt while females wear beltless slacks or an optional beltless skirt. All personnel wear a black unisex garrison cap. Silver anodized-metal rank insignia is worn on shirt/blouse collars and cap. The service uniform also includes a black relaxed-fit jacket with a knit stand-up collar and epaulets, on which petty officers wear large, silver anodized-metal rate insignia.

== Working uniforms ==
Working uniforms are described by the navy as being worn when other uniforms may become unduly soiled or are otherwise inappropriate for the task at hand. These are worn at sea and in industrial environments ashore. In July 2010, the Navy Working Uniform and coveralls became the only authorized working uniforms. V-neck sweaters were authorized with coveralls until 2015.

=== Navy Working Uniform ===
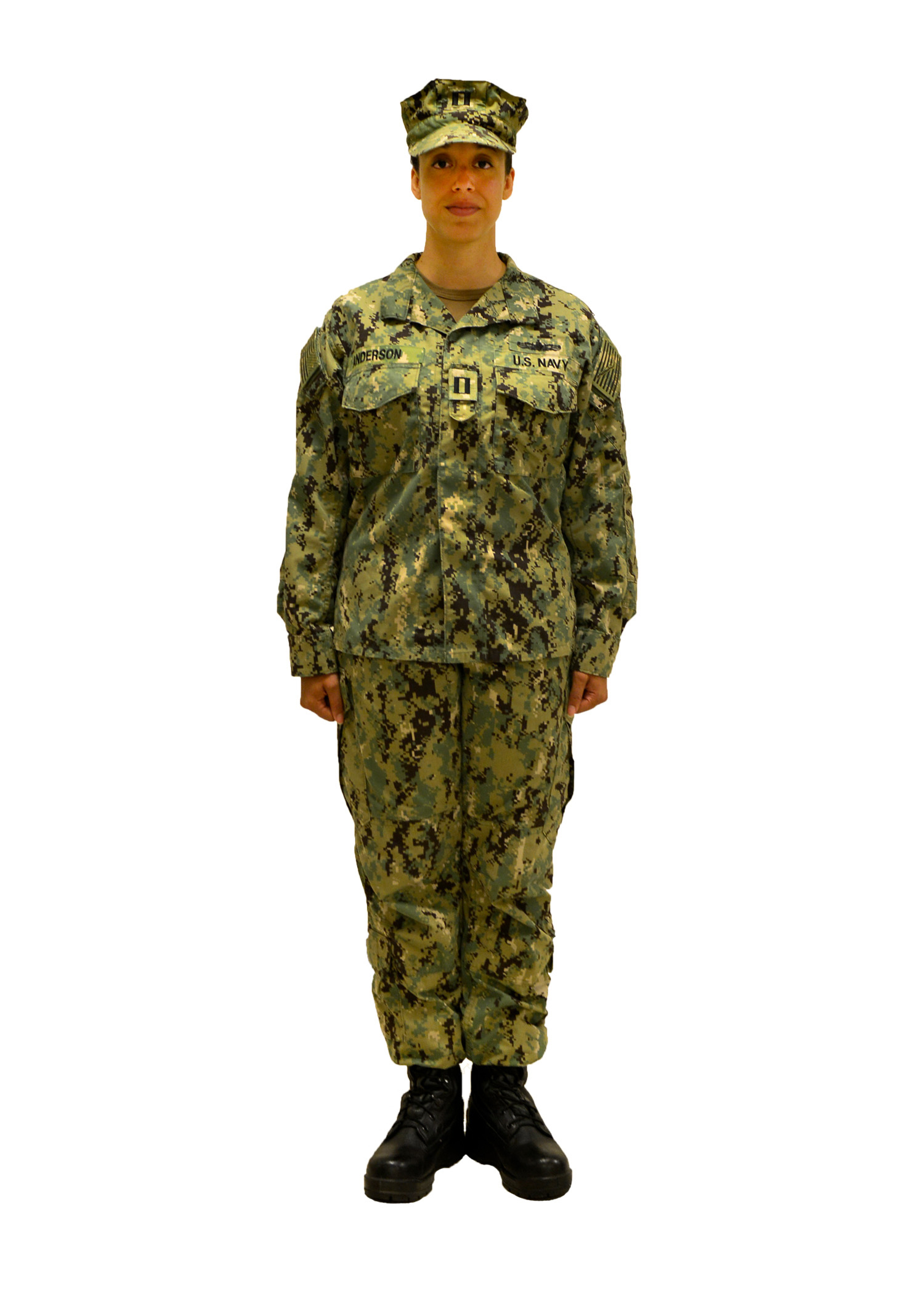
A female officer wearing the NWU Type III in AOR-2 (2016)

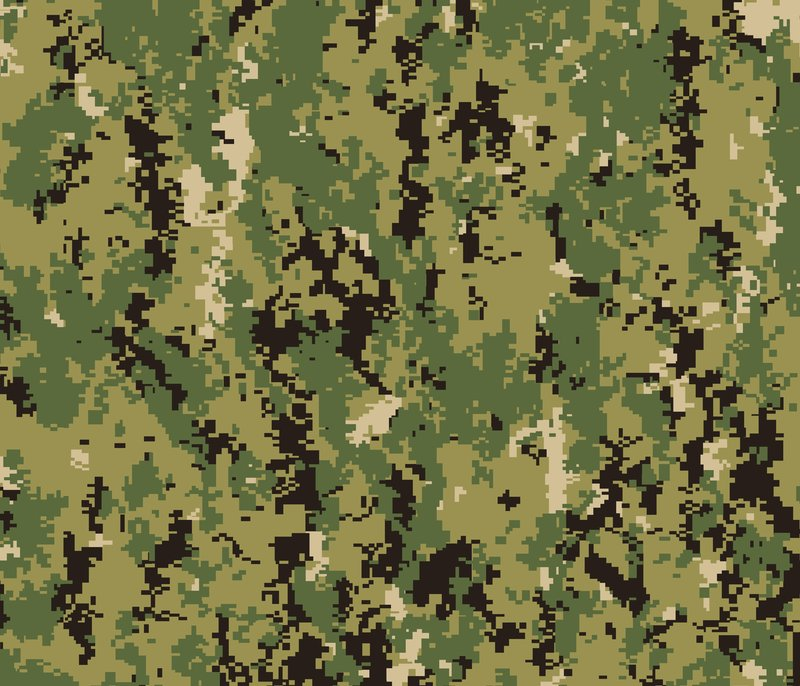
A digitized rendition of a swatch of AOR-2, the camouflage pattern used on the NWU Type III.

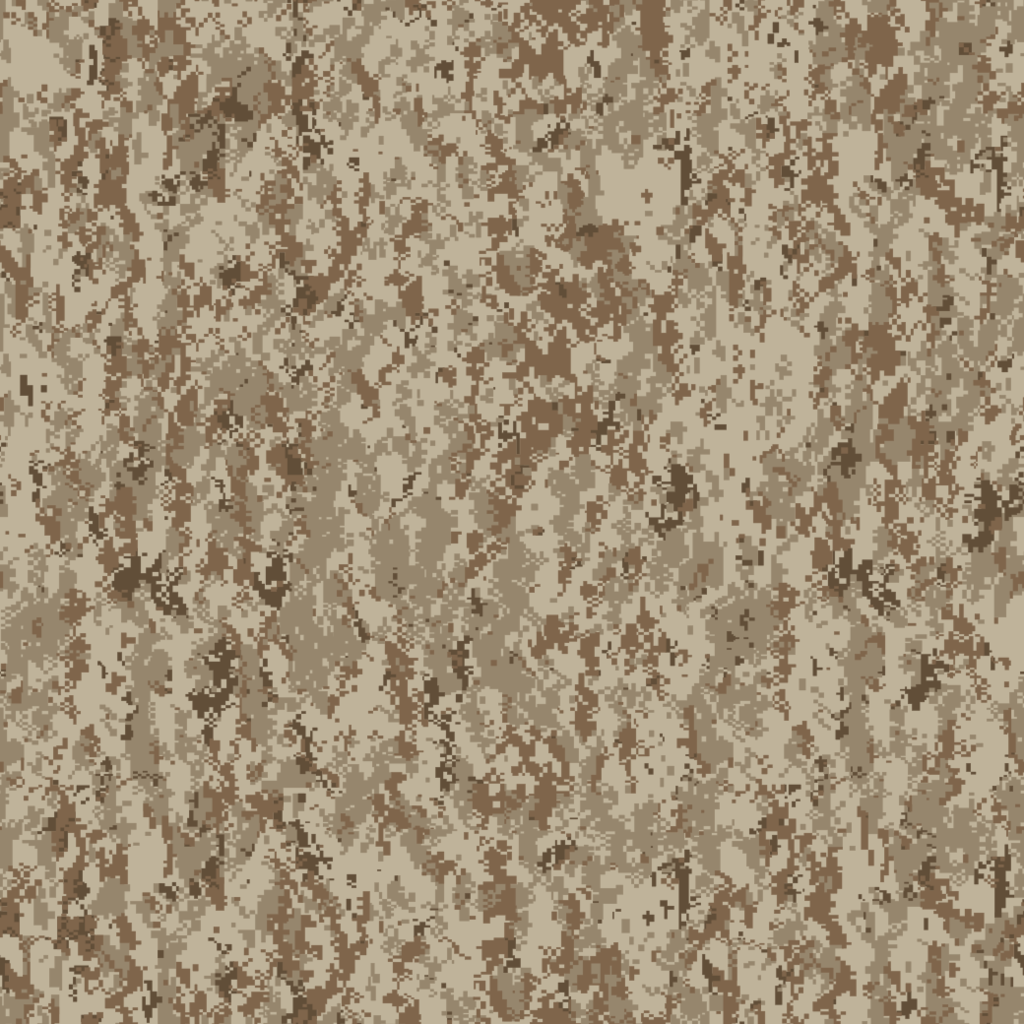
A digitized rendition of a swatch of AOR-1, the camouflage pattern used on the NWU Type II.

The Navy Working Uniform (NWU) is a utility uniform with multiple pockets on the shirt and trousers. Three versions of the uniform exist, each with a multi-color digital camouflage print pattern similar to those introduced by other services. Type I is predominantly blue with some gray for the majority of sailors. It was originally developed for shipboard use, but proved unsuitable for shipboard environments and was discontinued in 2019. Type II is a desert digital pattern currently restricted to SEALs and other sailors such as Seabees assigned to Naval Special Warfare Units when in desert environments. Type III is a woodland digital pattern for sailors in shore commands and riverine units. The camouflage patterns are similar to the MARPAT worn on the Marine Corps Combat Utility Uniform by U.S. Marines.

The colors of the NWU Type I, according to the U.S. Navy, were intended to reflect the navy's heritage and connection to seaborne operations, while hiding wear and stains, something unavoidable with the utilities and working khakis used previously. The colors were chosen to match the most commonly used paint colors aboard ship, extending the lifetime of the uniform on long deployments where uniforms often come into contact with freshly painted surfaces. An anchor, USS Constitution, and eagle (ACE) emblem is embroidered on the left breast pocket on all Type I NWUs. Accessories included a navy blue cotton T-shirt, an eight-point utility cover, and a web belt with closed buckle. The uniform was worn with rank insignia on both collar points and on the front panel of the utility cover, with sew-on name and "U.S. NAVY" tapes, also on the new digital background pattern, having gold-colored lettering for officers, CPOs and midshipmen. All ranks below CPO wore silver-lettered name tapes. The NWU Type I was phased into service beginning in January 2009., but was phased out as of 1 October 2019.

The Type II and III patterns are overall darker than their respective MARPAT progenitors, modified with different color shades and a vertically-aligned pixel pattern for the woodland version (compared to the horizontal alignment of woodland MARPAT). The additional patterns addressed the fact that the blue and grey Type I pattern was not meant for a tactical environment. Rank insignia is embroidered and worn on a tab in the center of the torso, name and "U.S. Navy" tabs are embroidered in brown (Type II) or black (Type III). Backlash from Marines, including an objection from Commandant Conway, led to restrictions when wear regulations were released in 2010. The Type II is restricted for wear to Naval Special Warfare personnel, while Type III was restricted to Navy ground units until late 2016.

The uniforms are composed of a 50/50 nylon and cotton blend, which eliminates the need for a "starch and press" appearance and reduces the possibility of snags and tears from sharp objects (thus making the garment last longer). However this blend combines high flammability with the strength to hold onto the sailor's body while burning.

In August 2016 the U.S. Navy announced that it is eliminating the NWU Type I in favor of the Type III which was phased in by 1 October 2019 for wear as the standard working uniform ashore for all Navy personnel. Type III began being issued to new navy recruits in October 2017. The Type II will remain restricted to wear by Naval Special Warfare sailors when in desert environments. The Navy's goal of developing a single working uniform for wear aboard ship and ashore and by all ranks and rates which the NWU Type I was supposed to fulfill was never realized by the Type I. Soon after its introduction it was found to be unsuitable for shipboard wear because of its lack of flame resistance and so was banned from wear aboard ship (except for when in port) thus making it essentially a uniform to be worn while ashore only. As a uniform for wear ashore only, a pattern designed to conceal stains aboard ships is not nearly as effective at concealment as a pattern designed to conceal people on land, thus the IIIs are used ashore. The Navy continues to work to develop a new shipboard working uniform.

While Navy uniforms traditionally have featured an indication of rank on the cover, the Type III uniforms have been designated to replace the rank insignia with the Anchor, Constitution, and Eagle (ACE) insignia per guidance that "The design of the eight-point utility cap is scheduled for a design change that will replace the rank device with the ACE logo"

All-weather garments include a unisex pullover sweater, a fleece jacket, and a parka, all of which are available in matching camouflage patterns. Beginning in 2016 the Navy had planned to also issue a lightweight version of the NWU Type I more suitable to hot environments.

Black safety boots, identical to those worn by United States Coast Guard personnel with their Operational Dress Uniform, are the standard for sailors located in the contiguous United States. Brown or tan boots can be authorized for wear with the Type II and III as needed.

=== Shipboard Working Uniform ===
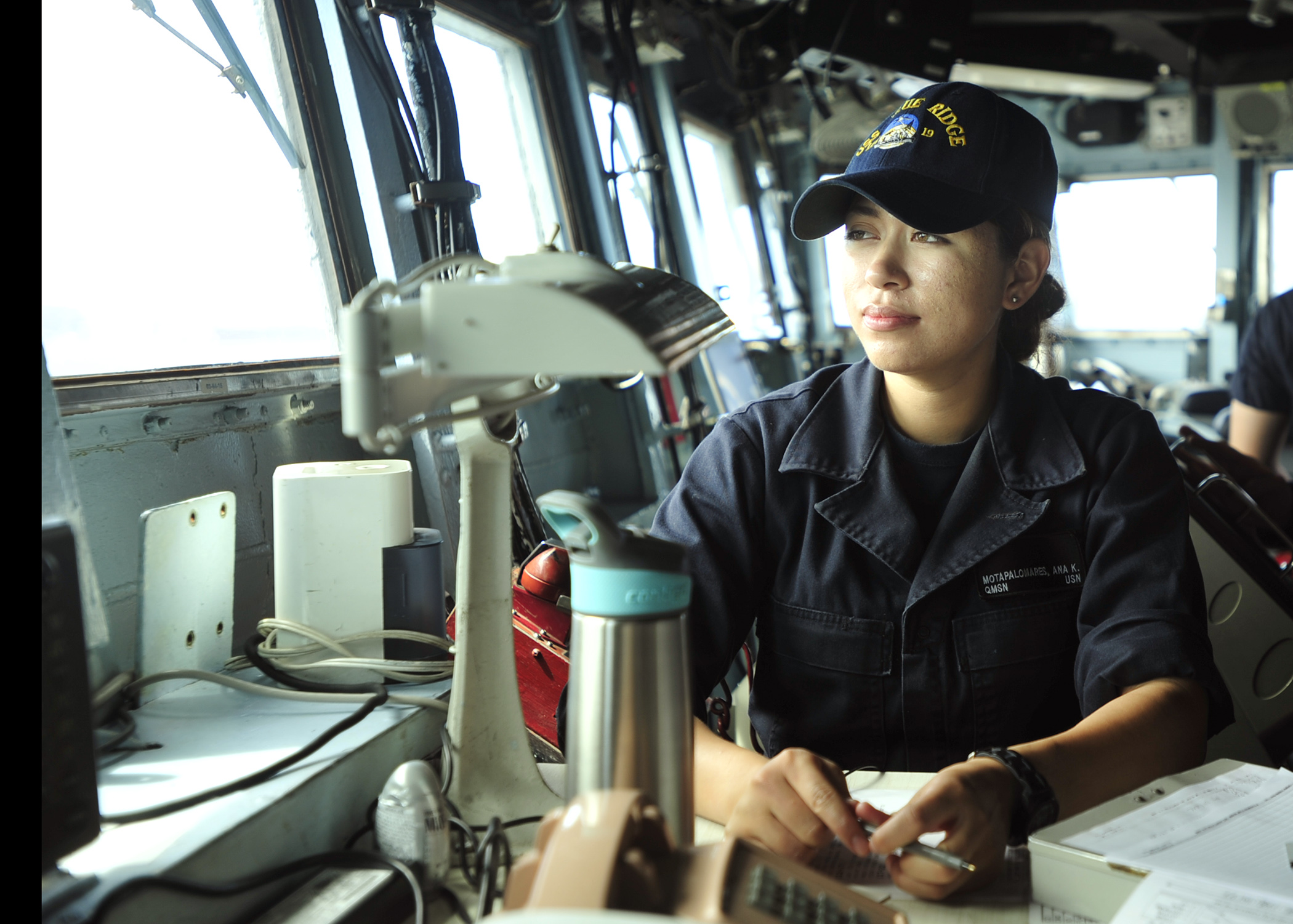
A navy seaman wearing flame-resistant "FRV" coveralls in 2015.

The U.S. Navy issued a new model coverall for use as a shipboard working uniform beginning in early 2014. The new flame resistant variant (FRV) coverall is used aboard all ships. It has largely replaced for shipboard use polyester cotton blend coveralls that provided inadequate fire protection and the NWU Type I for the same reason. The all cotton FRVs are dark blue in color compared to the older coveralls, which are lighter. They use rectangular velcro-backed nametags similar to those worn on flight crew suits, rather than the nametapes of the previous coverall.

U.S. Fleet Forces Command (FFC) continues a multi-phase wear test of improved flame resistant variant (IFRV) working uniform components for shipboard wear. FFC most recently conducted in-depth focus groups with fleet sailors aimed at refining the design of the IFRV coverall. The IFRV coverall was approved for issue on 17 January 2017.

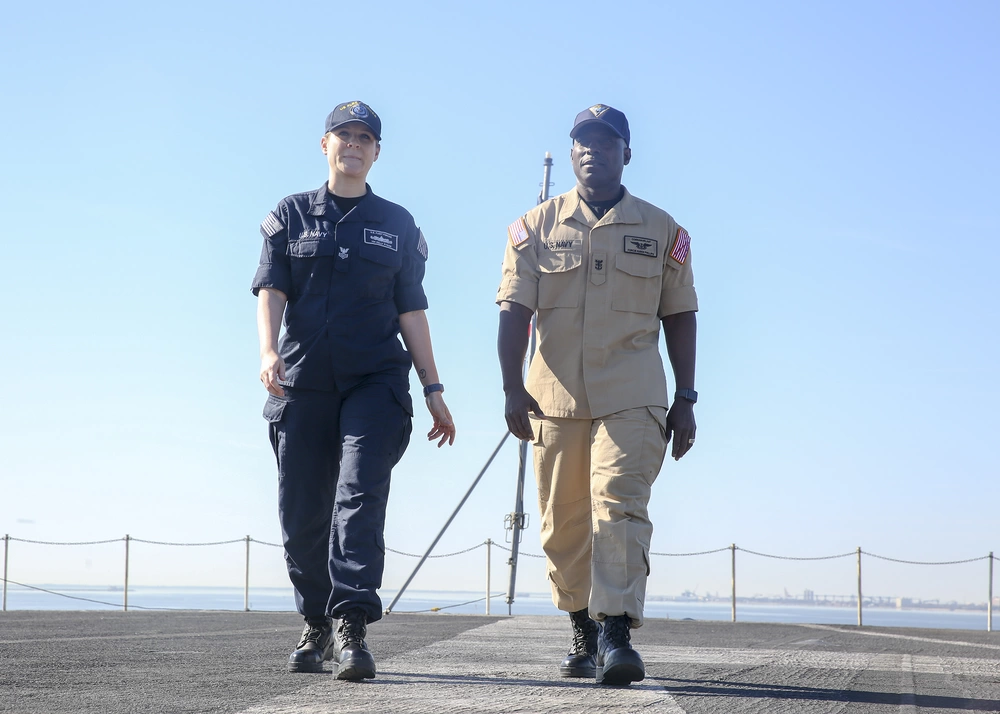
U.S. Fleet Forces Conducts Wear Test of Two-Piece Organizational Clothing Prototype.

Additional feedback from the focus groups, subsequently validated by a senior level working group, resulted in the preliminary design of a two-piece utility shipboard uniform that can be worn both at sea and operational support jobs ashore. Wear tests of the prototype two-piece variants occurred in 2019. In December 2022 the Navy began full roll-out of the Two-Piece Organizational Clothing uniform, commonly referred to as the 2POC. The 2POC is the new primary at-sea uniform, but is also authorized in port and off base while making routine stops. The uniform is similar in cut to the NWU Type III. It is dark blue for junior enlisted sailors and khaki for officers and CPOs. All east and west coast based Navy ship crews were scheduled to receive the uniform in 2024.

== Coats ==
When wearing service dress uniforms, enlisted sailors may wear a navy blue pea coat (with a rate insignia on the left sleeve for petty officer third class and higher), a navy blue double-breasted all-weather coat with rate insignia worn on the collar, or a black cold-weather parka with insignia worn on a center-chest tab. Officers and chief petty officers may wear a navy blue calf-length wool "bridge coat" or waist-length reefer (with gold buttons and rank insignia worn on the shoulder boards), the all-weather coat, with rank insignia also worn on the shoulder or collar depending on rank, or the black cold-weather parka.

All sailors in service uniforms are authorized to wear a black waist-length relaxed-fit jacket with knit cuff worn with appropriate rank devices on the shoulder boards. A khaki windbreaker, previously authorized only with the service khaki uniform, was discontinued on 30 September 2016.

Sailors wearing the NWU type III may wear a matching camouflage-patterned parka with a removable polyester fleece liner. The liner may also be worn as a stand-alone coat

Naval aviators, naval flight officers, naval flight surgeons, naval aviation physiologists, and naval aircrewmen are authorized to wear G-1 seal-brown goatskin-leather flight jackets, with warfare insignia listed on a name-tag (rank optional) over the left breast pocket, either permanently stitched to the leather or attached with a Velcro hook-and-loop fastener. These jackets were previously adorned with various "mission patches," which indicate places the wearer has served. Today, patches on the G-1 are limited to a maximum of three in addition to the name-tag, i.e., a unit insignia on the right chest pocket, an aircraft type insignia on the right sleeve and an aircraft type insignia or embroidered U.S. flag on the left sleeve.

== Special uniform situations ==
=== Navy Bands ===
All enlisted members of the U.S. Navy Band, Washington, D.C., and the U.S. Naval Academy Band, regardless of rate, wear chief petty officer-style dress uniforms (i.e. Service and Full Dress Blues and Whites and Dinner Dress).

=== Navy personnel attached to Marine Corps units ===
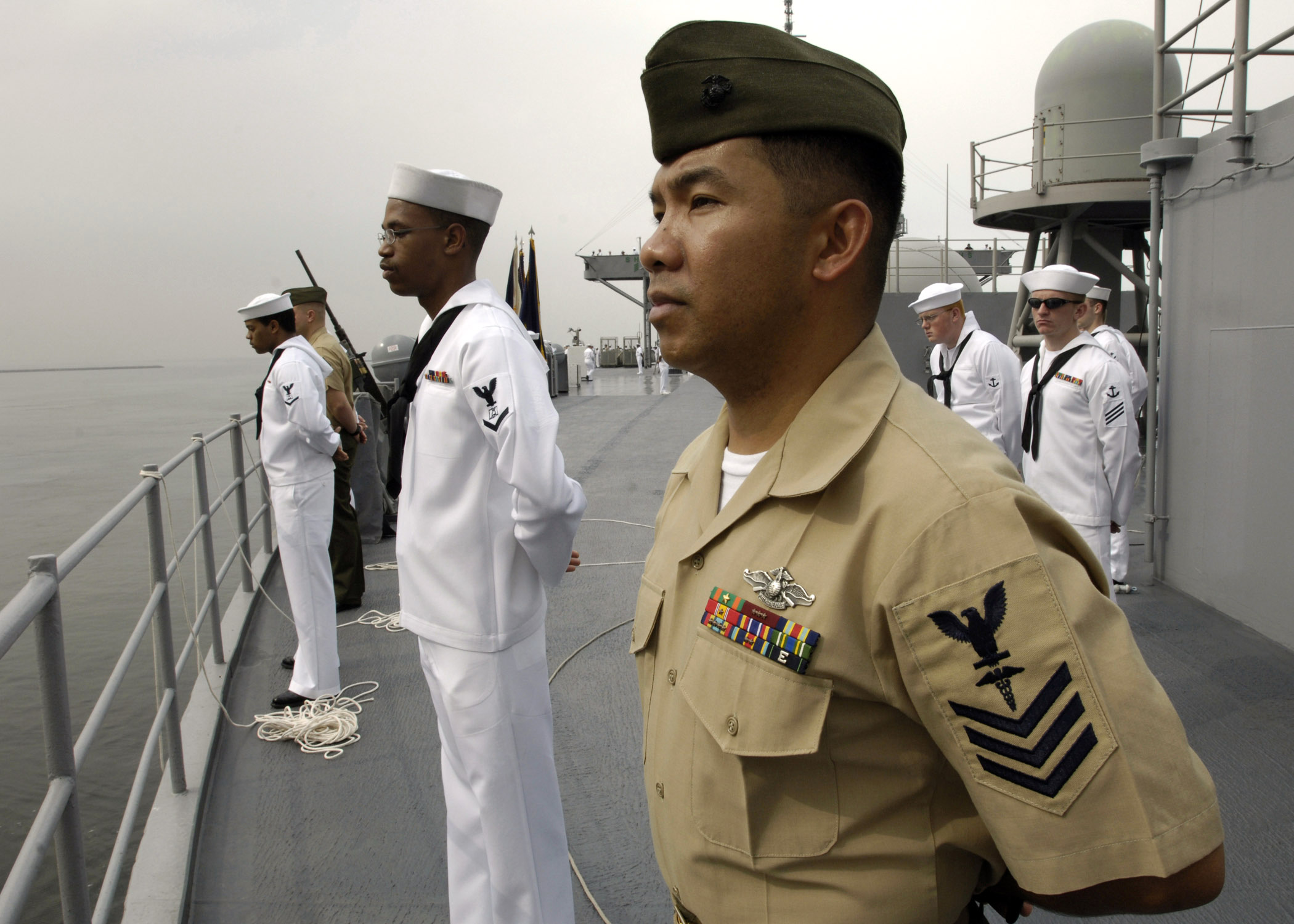
Corpsman wearing the Marine Corps Service Uniform in 2007.

As the Marine Corps does not have medical personnel, chaplains, and certain lawyers and divers, the Navy provides them. (Note: The Chief of Naval Operations and Commandant of the Marine Corps are heads of separate branches – the connections between the Navy and Marines include that they report to the Secretary of the Navy and they share common legal institutions like Naval Criminal Investigative Service and the Navy-Marine Corps Court of Criminal Appeals.) These officers and enlisted of the Fleet Marine Force include doctors, dentists, nurses, hospital corpsmen, medical service sailors, chaplains, religious program specialists, Naval Gunfire Liaison Officers, divers, lawyers, legalmen, and Naval Academy midshipmen who are selected to be Marine officers. Because of this relationship, these personnel are authorized to wear U.S. Marine Corps utility (desert/woodland) uniforms with Navy rank insignia replacing the Marine insignia for enlisted personnel (Navy and Marine officer rank insignia are identical) and with a "U.S. Navy" nametape replacing the "U.S. Marines" one. They wear the 8-point utility cover, but it lacks the Marine Corps emblem. Additionally, Navy personnel attached to Marine units can elect to wear Marine service uniforms, with Navy insignia. Those opting to wear Marine Corps service uniforms must meet Marine Corps grooming and physical appearance standards, which are more stringent than Navy standards. This does not apply to the MARPAT uniforms, as this uniform is required for wear in the field when attached to Marine units, regardless of adherence to Marine Corps grooming standards. Navy personnel are not authorized to wear the Marine Corps Dress Blue Uniform; instead Navy Dress Blue and White uniforms are worn.

=== Other wear of combat utilities ===
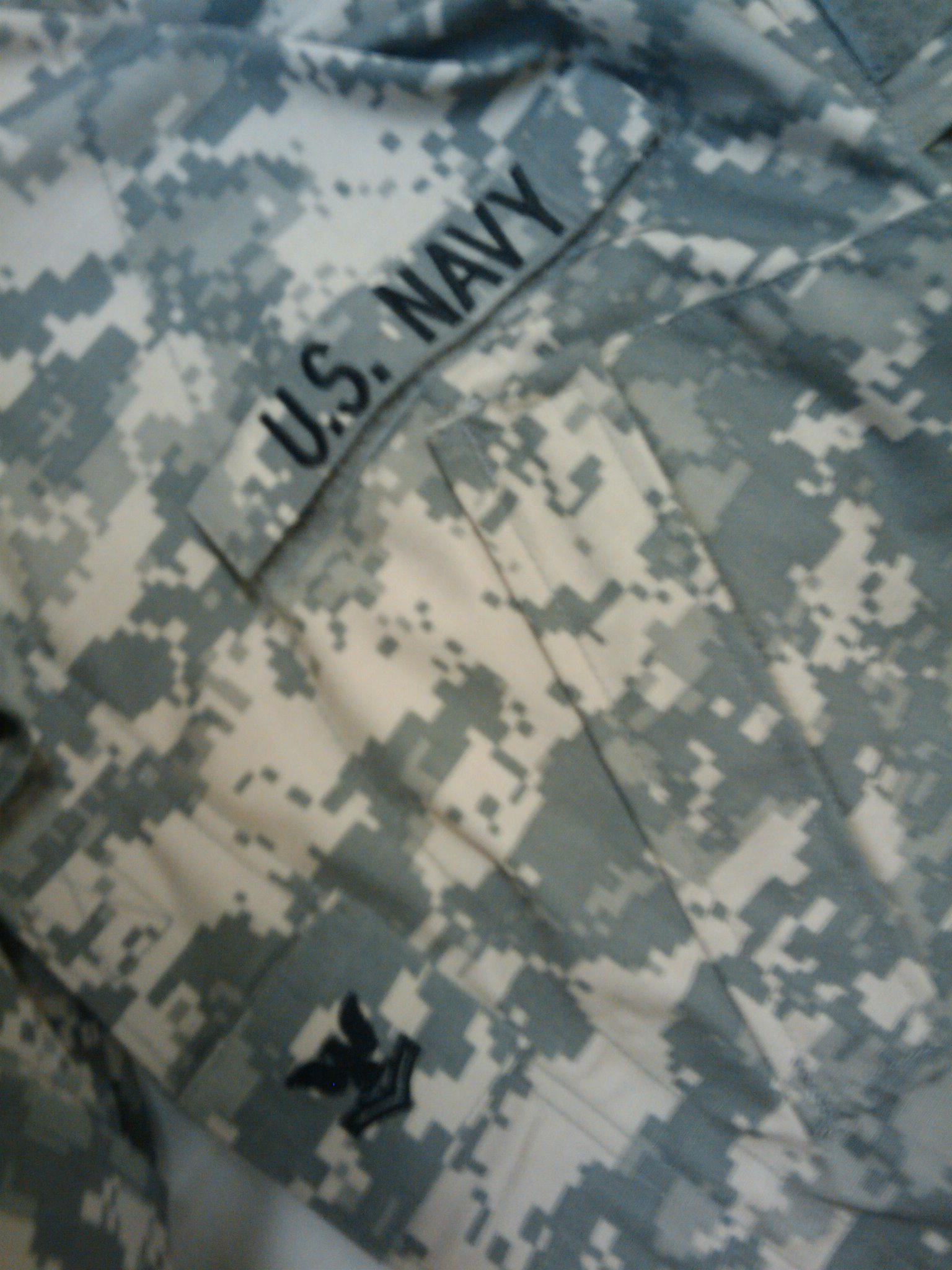
Navy Rank and Markings on Army ACU

In addition to Marine Corps detachments, combat utilities are also worn by Navy SEAL teams, along with SWCC crews who conduct clandestine maritime operations including supporting SEAL platoons and SOF cells. The Combat Utility Uniform (CUU) is authorized for those in the Explosive Ordnance Disposal (EOD) and Fleet Diver communities. Combat utilities are also authorized for those attached to the Naval Construction Force (NCF) (Seabee), Navy's Expeditionary Logistics Group, or the Navy's Expeditionary Combat Command (NECC). Also, Navy personnel assigned to some joint headquarters units, like Central Command in Qatar and Iraq, wear Desert Utility Uniforms (DUU). Navy personnel such as Individual Augmentees, Combat Camera Groups, Detainee OPS, and some in the special warfare community have been wearing the Army's ACU (Army Combat Uniform) when working closely with or attached to Army commands.

=== Naval aviation personnel ===
Aviators, Naval flight officers, and Naval aircrewmen are authorized to wear green or desert flight suits (made of nomex for fire protection), with rank insignia for officers stitched on the shoulders, and a name tag/warfare insignia on the left breast pocket. Either a Command/Navy ballcap or a khaki garrison cap (for commissioned officers and CPOs) are worn with this uniform. Green flight suits are the standard wear; however, wing commanders may authorize desert flight suits for personnel located in hot climates. As of 2012, flight suits may now be worn off base in the same manner as the Navy Working Uniform.

Coveralls are authorized to be worn with either the all-weather coat or utility jacket (for petty officers only).

==== Flight deck ====
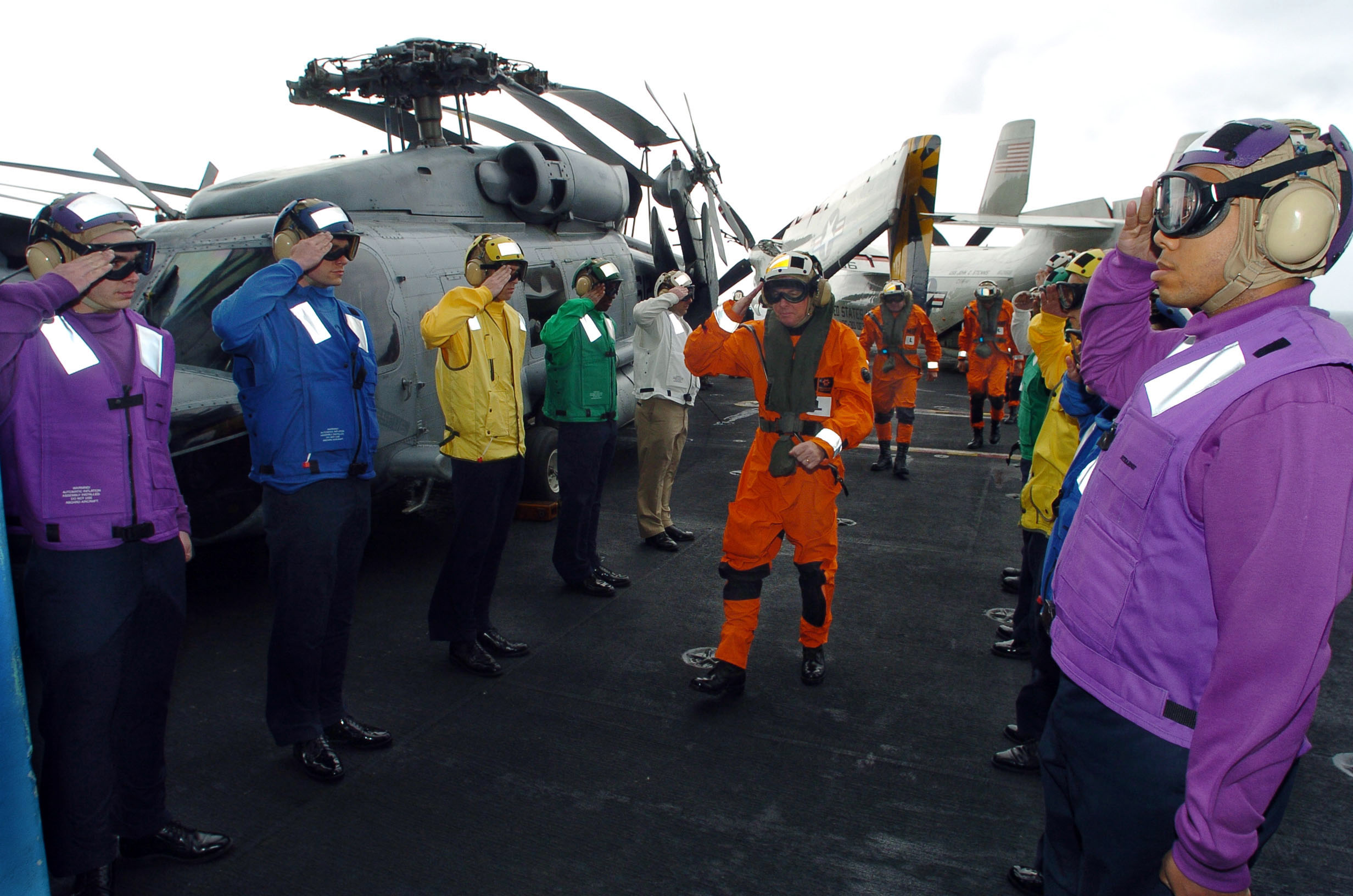
Flightdeck personnel on board an aircraft carrier wearing different colored jerseys, denoting a specific function. (U.S. Navy) (2004)

Flight deck crew wear colored jerseys which distinguish each personnel's function by sight.

US aircraft carrier: jack colors and tasks
Color	Role
Yellow	Aircraft handling officer; Catapult and arresting gear officer; Plane director – responsible for all movement of all aircraft on the flight/hangar deck
Green	Catapult and arresting gear crew; Visual landing aid electrician; Air wing maintainer; Air wing quality controller; Cargo-handler; Ground support equipment (GSE) troubleshooter; Hook runner; Photographer's mate; Helicopter landing signal enlisted personnel (LSE)
Red	Ordnance handler; Crash and salvage crew; Explosive ordnance disposal (EOD); Firefighter and damage control party
Purple	Aviation fuel handler
Blue	Trainee plane handler; Chocks and chains – entry-level flight-deck workers under the yellowshirts; Aircraft elevator operator; Tractor driver; Messengers and phone talker
Brown	Air wing plane captain – air wing squadron personnel who prepare aircraft for flight; Air wing line leading petty officer
White	Quality assurance (QA); Squadron plane inspector; Landing signal officer (LSO); Air transfer officer (ATO); Liquid oxygen (LOX) crew; Safety observer; Medical personnel (white with Red Cross emblem)

=== USS Constitution ===
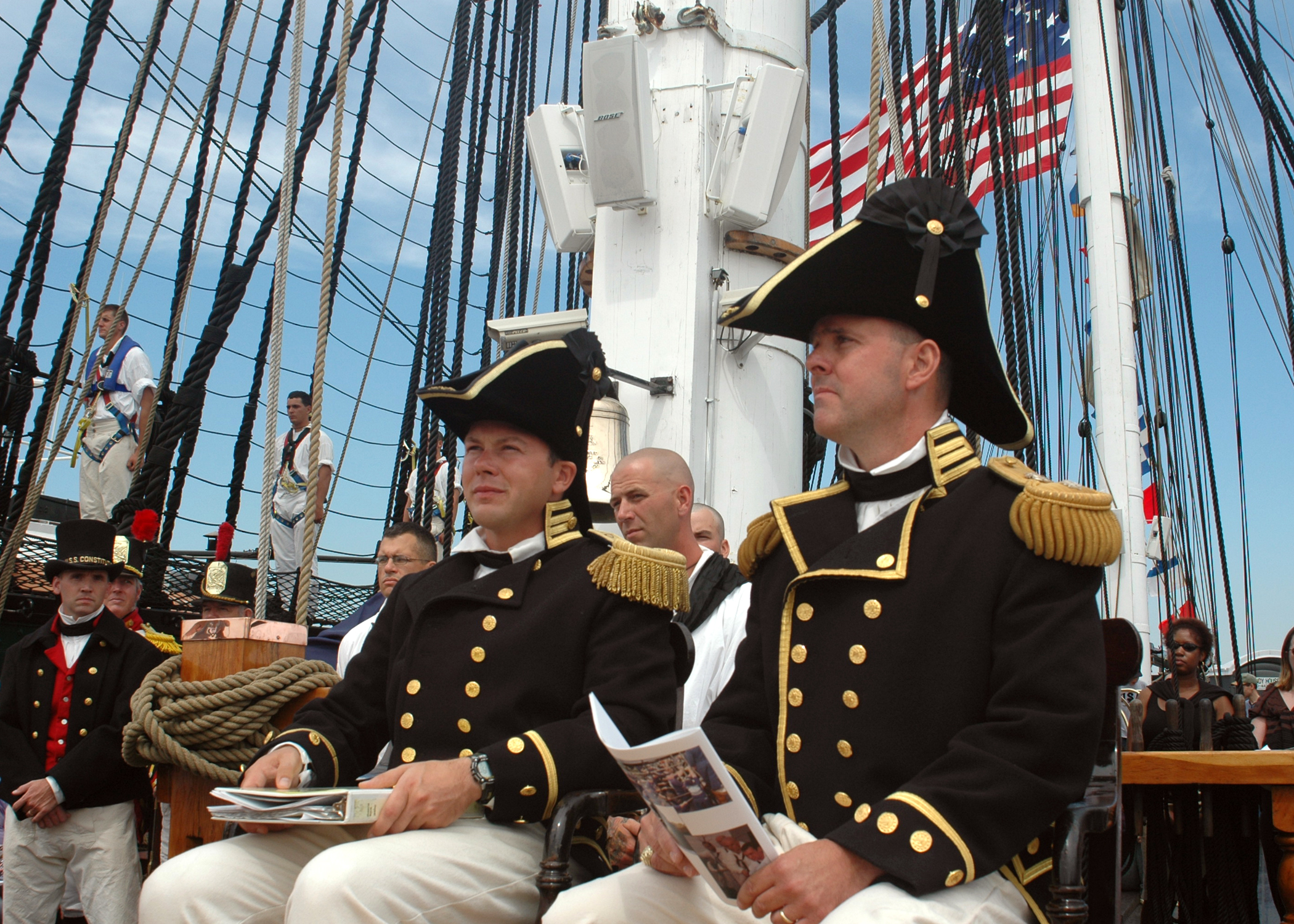
Officers and crew of USS Constitution (2005)

The ship USS Constitution is the oldest commissioned ship in the U.S. Navy, the only one of the six original United States frigates still in existence. Constitution is presented to the public as the ship appeared during the War of 1812, and personnel stationed aboard Constitution still wear uniforms according to regulations posted in 1813. These uniforms are worn on ceremonial occasions, such as the annual turn-around cruise in Boston every Independence Day.

=== U.S. Naval Academy ===
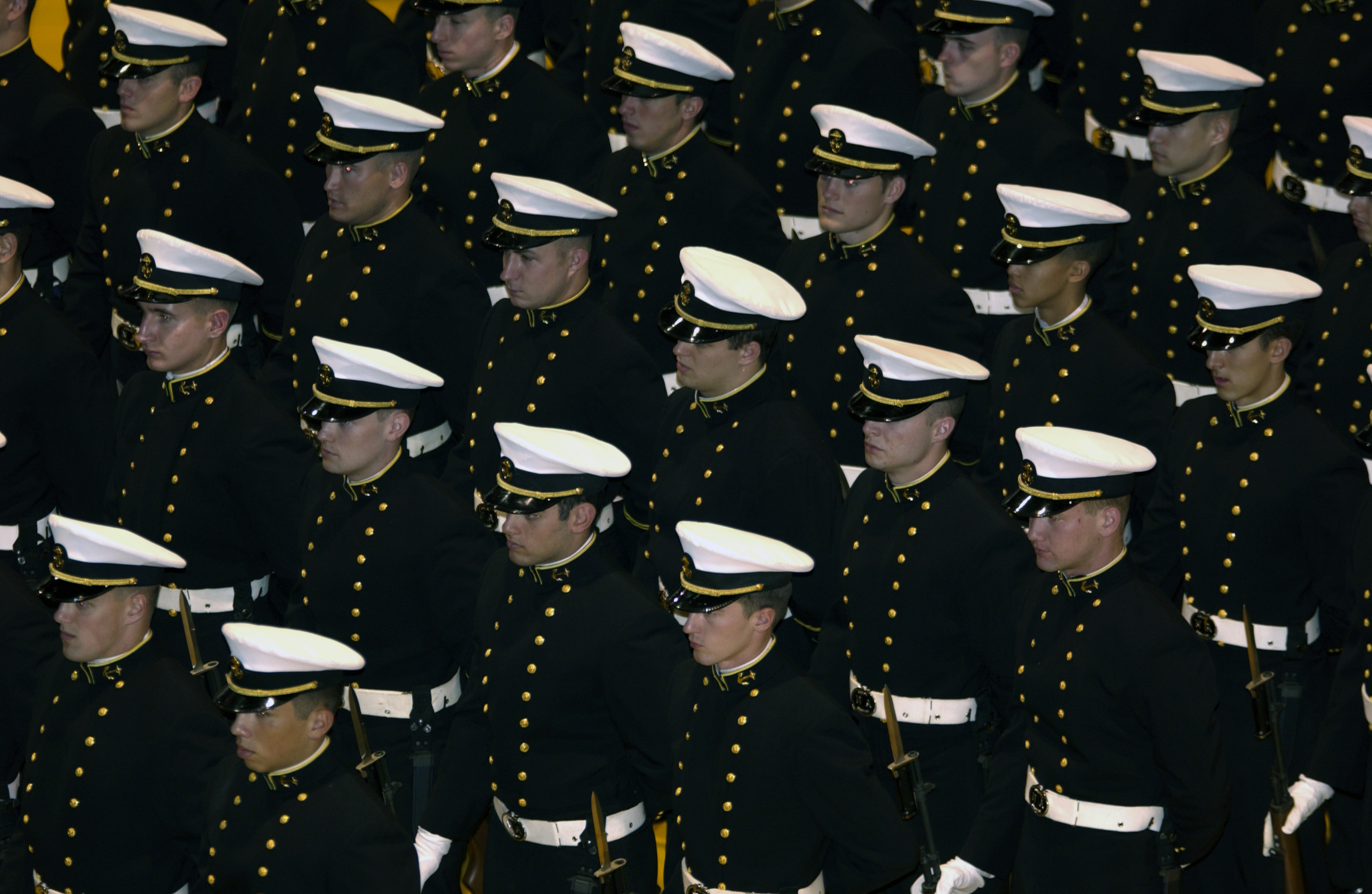
USNA Midshipmen in parade dress (2003)

U.S. Naval Academy Midshipmen, in addition to standard Navy officer uniforms, also wear parade dress of traditional 19th-century military cut, waist-length tunics with stand collars and double rows of gold buttons.

USNA Midshipmen also wear a Blue Working uniform, identical in cut to Service Khaki but in a Navy Blue fabric. New Midshipmen during Plebe Summer training wear Whiteworks, which consist of a white sailor's jumper and bell-bottom trousers.

=== Prisoners ===
Prisoners in the custody of Navy shore correctional facilities are required to wear a special uniform, instead of their regular working uniform. All prisoners, regardless of their military branch, wear the same uniform, with a dark blue variant for pre-trial confinement and a khaki one for post-trial confinement.

== Obsolete uniforms ==
=== NWU Type I ===
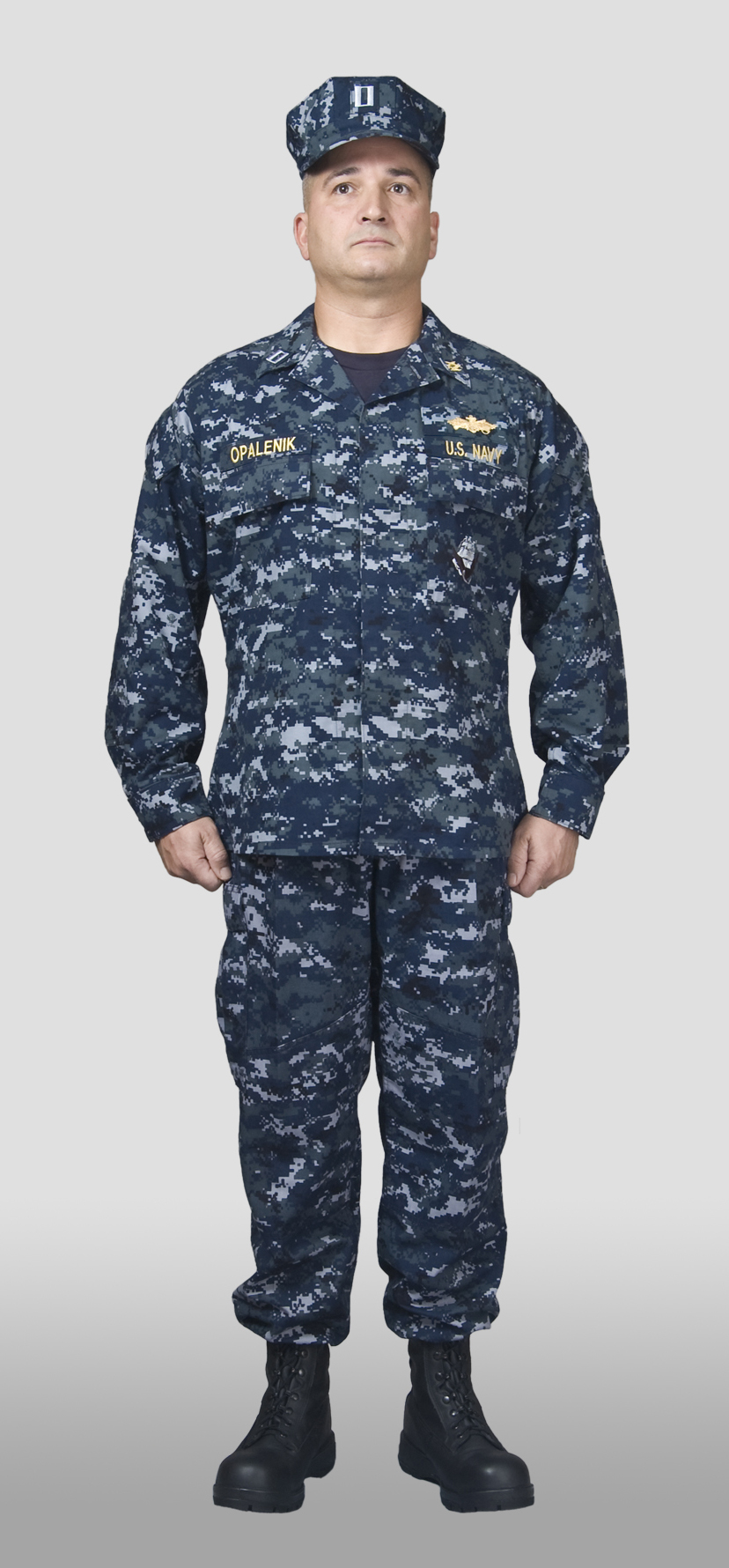
A male navy officer wearing the NWU Type I (2008); the uniform was retired in 2019.

Introduced in 2008, the Navy Working Uniform in blue and gray pixelated camouflage was only in service until 2019, having already been banned from shipboard use when it was found not to be flame-retardant. It had been subject to mockery both inside and outside the Navy, as "Aquaflage", "Blueberries", and "Battle Dress Oceanic", and pointed questions about the utility of camouflage for ships' crews. The tan and green Type II and III remain in service, for Navy personnel ashore.

=== Aviation Working Khaki ===
Navy Uniform Regulations Change No. 11 issued 22 June 1917 authorized naval aviators to wear a summer service flying uniform of Marine Corps khaki of the same pattern as the officers' service dress white uniform tunic and trousers. It was to be worn with high, laced tan leather shoes only "when on immediate and active duty with aircraft", and might be worn under similarly colored moleskin or khaki canvas coveralls as a "working dress" uniform.

Naval aviators typically flew patrol bombers from shore bases until the first United States aircraft carrier USS Langley was commissioned on 20 March 1922. Differing uniforms afloat precipitated a 13 October 1922 Bureau of Navigation letter: "Uniforms for aviation will be the same as for other naval officers, doing away with the green and khaki, which may be worn until June 1, 1923, but only at air stations." Khaki aviation uniforms of a somewhat different pattern were reinstated on 8 April 1925.

=== Service Dress Khaki ===
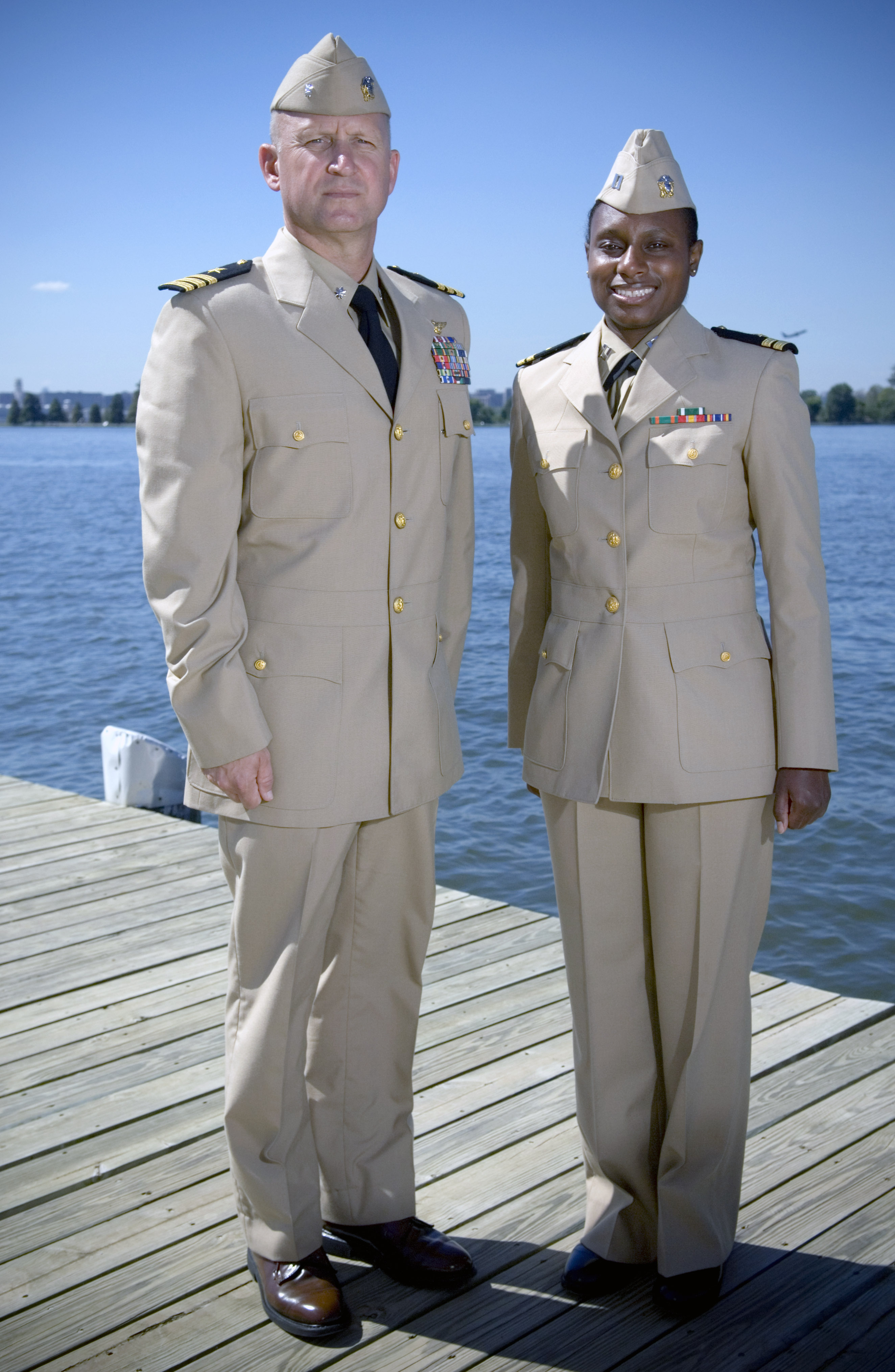
Two naval officers wearing the former service dress khaki uniform in September 2007.

During World War II, a single-breasted heavy cotton twill jacket with shoulder boards was worn with cotton twill trousers over a long-sleeved cotton shirt with a black necktie as "Service Dress Khaki", allowing cleaning in shipboard laundry facilities. Later on, through the Vietnam War, the trousers and jacket were often made of light wool or wool-blend fabric as routine access to dry-cleaning facilities became available. The uniform was dropped in 1975 by then-Chief of Naval Operations, Admiral James Holloway, in order to reduce the number of items in the officer's seabag. A revived version of the uniform was announced in 2006 on a test basis. In 2008 it was authorized for wear by commissioned officers and CPOs during the summer months and in tropical climates. The uniform reintroduced a khaki service coat worn with a black necktie and shoulder boards. It was intended to provide a more practical alternative to the Service Dress Whites and a more formal alternative to the Service Khakis. This uniform was frequently worn in public by Adm. Mike Mullen during his time as Chief of Naval Operations and Chairman of the Joint Chiefs of Staff; Mullen was seen wearing this uniform with the jacket removed in the photograph in the White House Situation Room during the Navy SEAL raid on Osama bin Laden's compound. In October 2012, cost considerations led to the cancellation of the full-scale reintroduction of the uniform, and the uniform was dropped from the Navy.

=== Service Dress Blue Yankee ===
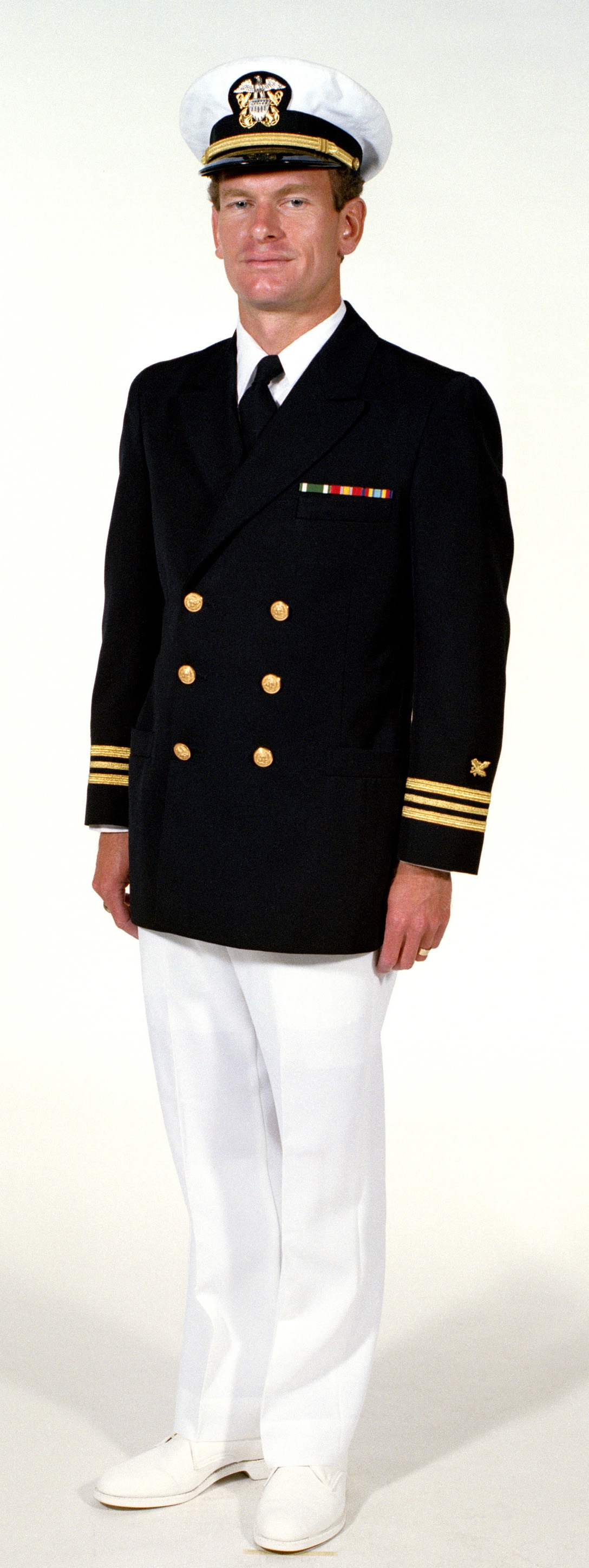
U.S. Navy Uniform: Service dress blue Yankee, male Navy officers, 1983.

The rarely seen Service Dress Blue Yankee uniform replaced the dark trousers and black shoes of Service Dress Blue with white trousers and shoes from the white uniform. Prescribed for both chiefs and officers.

=== Winter Working Blues ===
The Winter Working Blue uniform was authorized for all ranks. Due to its near-black color, it was called the "Johnny Cash" uniform (a reference to the song/album Man in Black by the singer of the same name). It was a long sleeve black button-up shirt and black belt and trousers (optional skirt for females), with the headgear either the combination cap (all E-7 and above, female E-6s and below) or white Dixie Cup (male E-6s and below). Garrison caps were an optional secondary headgear, allowed to be worn for all ranks.

As a service uniform, ribbons and badges were worn, and officers and chief petty officers wore metal collar insignia, while enlisted E-6 and below wore just the rating badge on the left arm. All men wore ties, females necktabs, with an optional silver clip for sailors at the rate of petty officer first class and below, others a gold clip. The Working Blue variant omitted the tie and ribbons.

=== Working Khaki ===
The Working Khaki uniform was worn by officers and chief petty officers, primarily aboard ship or in selected working areas at bases ashore. Originally it was simply the Service Dress Khaki uniform worn without the coat and tie. Similar to, but less formal than, the Service Khaki, it consisted of a short or long-sleeve khaki uniform shirt, with warfare insignia and badges (i.e. command pins, nametags, etc., but no ribbons) worn on the top of the left pocket, and pin-on metal rank devices located on the collar. It also came with a set of khaki trousers, a khaki belt with a gold belt buckle, a command or "U.S. Navy" ballcap (garrison cap optional), and black or brown low quarter shoes, black or brown boots, or black leather safety shoes. It was often referred to as the "Wash Khaki" uniform, because it was a 100% cotton uniform that could be laundered but required pressing, differentiating it from the Service Khaki made of Certified Navy Twill (CNT) or a poly-wool blend that is considered acceptable for wear ashore and off base, but which requires dry-cleaning. At the beginning of January 2011, the working khakis were replaced by the Navy Working Uniform.

=== Aviation Working Green ===
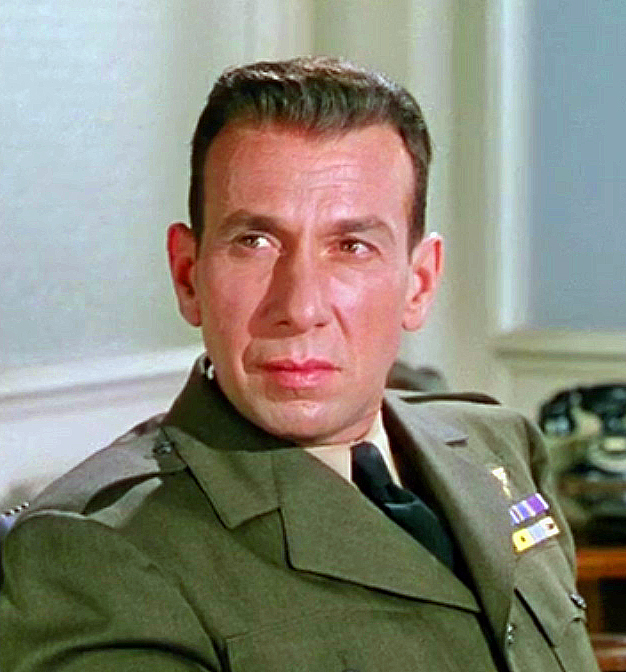
Actor José Ferrer wears an aviation working green uniform in the 1954 film The Caine Mutiny,

A winter working green uniform for commissioned officers and chief petty officers in the Naval Aviation community was authorized on 7 September 1917 in conjunction with adoption of the naval aviator wings breast insignia. The initial uniform pattern was the same as the officers' service dress white uniform tunic and trousers. Like the summer khaki uniform, it was to be worn with high, laced tan leather shoes. Like the aviation khaki uniform, the green uniform was temporarily banished during the early years of United States aircraft carrier operations from 1922 until a modified design was reauthorized in 1925. The final version, discontinued in January 2011, was somewhat similar to the Navy's revived Service Dress Khaki uniform in cut and design and bore additional similarities to the Marine Corps' Service Dress "Alpha" green uniform. It consisted of a green wool coat and green wool trousers with bronze buttons and a long-sleeve khaki shirt with black tie. Rank insignia consisted of black embroidery on sleeves in a style similar to the gold sleeve braid for officers, or rating marks and service "hash" marks for chief petty officers, on Service Dress Blue uniforms. Metal rank insignia was worn concurrently on the collar points of the khaki shirt by line officers and CPOs. For staff corps officers, rank insignia was worn on the right collar point and staff corps insignia on the left collar point (typically Medical Corps for Naval flight surgeons, etc.) of the shirt. Warfare insignia and, if applicable, Command at Sea and/or Command Ashore insignia, were worn on the jacket and optionally on the shirt. Command nametags were also optional on both the blouse and/or shirt. Brown shoes were typically worn, although this transitioned to black between 1975 and 1986 when brown shoes were discontinued. Following the reinstatement of brown shoes in 1986, brown shoes again became the most common footwear. Authorized headgear included a combination cap in green, or a green garrison cover.

During World War II and the Korean War, ribbons were also authorized with this uniform, making it a de facto "service uniform" or "liberty uniform," authorized for wear off base. But by the early 1960s, it had become limited to that of a "working uniform" for use on base or aboard ship only. It was infrequently worn, primarily due its expense and its 100% wool fabric that typically made it unsuitable outside of the winter months; in the working environments where AWGs were authorized, aviators typically found working khakis or flight suits more convenient.

The AWG uniform was formally phased out on 1 January 2011 along with several other uniforms as part of an extensive U.S. Navy uniform consolidation. The Type I Navy Working Uniform took its place.

=== Tropical Uniforms ===
The rarely seen Tropical White Uniform (also referred to as Tropical White Short) was similar to the Summer White Service uniform, except white knee shorts and knee socks were worn. It was colloquially known as the "Captain Stubing" uniform, after the character on The Love Boat TV show. Exceptionally rarely worn, though authorized with this uniform, was a pith helmet, with a Naval Officer's insignia at the front, above the brim.

Tropical working uniforms existed, but were variations on the working khaki and utility uniforms. Knee shorts and black knee socks are worn, along with short sleeved button-up shirts.

=== Summer White/Blue ("Salt and Pepper") ===
Initially worn by E-6 and below beginning in the mid-1970s with the temporary phaseout (until 1982) of the traditional "crackerjack" uniforms, it was later expanded to include chief petty officers and commissioned officers. Best known by the nickname "salt and peppers," the uniform consisted of a summer white shirt and winter blue (e.g. black) trousers for males and summer white blouse and winter blue trousers or winter blue skirt for females. The uniform was worn with a combination cap and black shoes. Although naval personnel still retained all the components that made up this uniform, its use was discontinued in 1983. Though the U.S. Navy proper discontinued the uniform in 1983, Navy Junior ROTC units continued to wear it for decades after, until they themselves finally discontinued their usage in June 2010.

=== Service Dress Gray ===
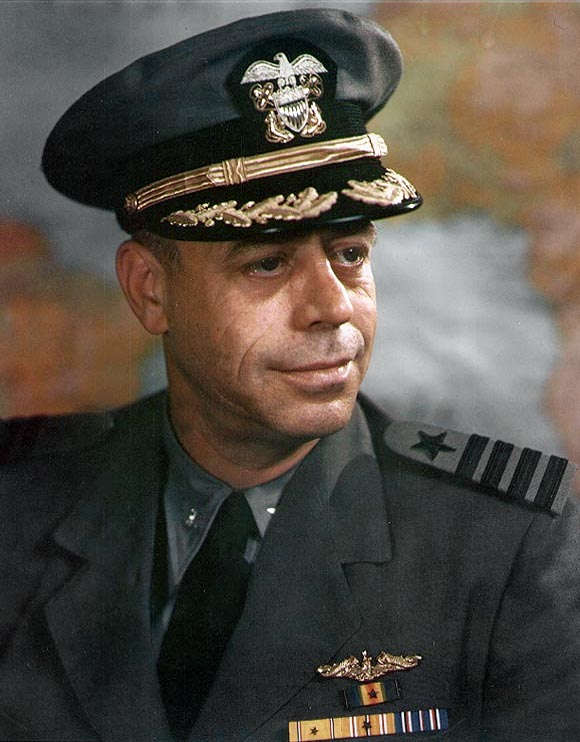
Captain Allan McCann wearing the Service Dress Gray uniform (1944)

This short-lived uniform for officers and CPOs was only authorized from 1943–49, but was a common sight on the East Coast and in the Atlantic/European Theater during World War II. It was identical in cut and material to the Service Dress Khaki uniform but medium gray in color with black buttons, worn with a lighter gray shirt and garrison or combination cap. Officers' shoulder boards were likewise gray, with stars/corps insignia and rank stripes in black. "Working grays" were the same uniform worn without the jacket and tie. The gray uniform was introduced by then-Chief of Naval Operations Ernest King, who thought khaki was more appropriate to land forces; Admiral Chester W. Nimitz disliked it and discouraged its wear in the Pacific Fleet.

=== CPO Whites ===
From 1893 until 1975, chief petty officers wore a Service Dress White uniform consisting of white cotton trousers and double-breasted reefer jacket with black necktie. Rating badges and service stripes in black were worn on the left sleeve. This uniform was also worn by members of Navy bands regardless of rank. Officer-pattern whites were authorized for CPOs in 1981.

=== Dungarees ===
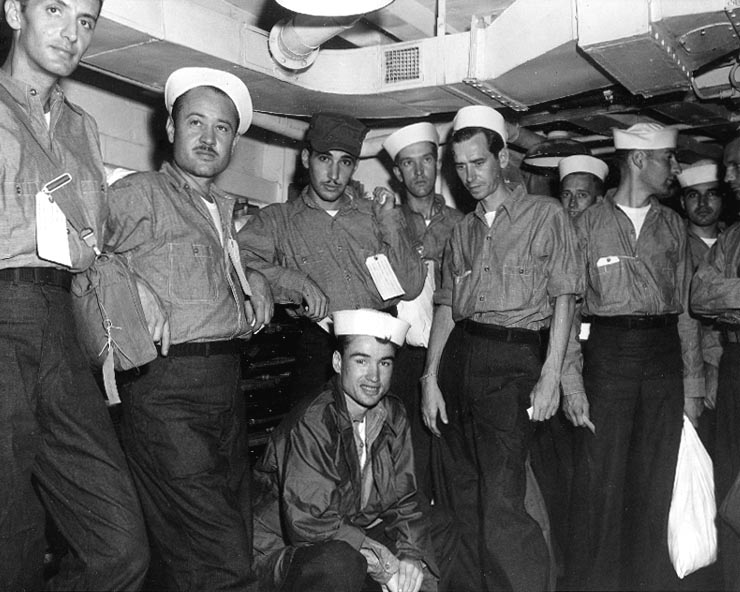
Freed U.S. POWs in World War II-era dungarees (1945)

Dungarees were the junior enlisted (E1-E6) working uniform worn from 1913 through the 1990s; through World War II dungarees with a garrison or combination cap were also worn by CPOs engaged in dirty jobs. They consisted of a short or long-sleeve blue chambray shirt, white T-shirt, and bell-bottom denim jeans with heptagonal "patch" pockets sewn on the front of the pant-legs rather than the traditional "slash" pockets often seen on civilian-worn jeans. Headgear was the white "dixie cup" cover for men and an early form of the black garrison cap or a black beret for women; after graduation from boot camp, the command ball cap was optional (and in practice more common). Starting in 1995, the white hat was no longer authorized for wear with dungarees, and the command (or Navy) ballcap became the predominant cover. During cold weather a black watch cap was allowed.

Unlike later working uniforms, dungarees were not allowed to be worn outside of military installations; service members were allowed to wear the uniform to and from the installation in a vehicle, but were not authorized to make any stops between while in the dungarees. In fact, until World War II dungarees could only be worn in port in ships' interior spaces, below the main deck or inside gun turrets.

The sailor's last name was stenciled in white on the trousers just above the back pocket on the right side. The name was also placed in black on the shirt just above the right breast pocket, usually stenciled on. Names could also be reinforced with embroidered thread of the appropriate color on both trousers and shirt. Rate badges (for petty officers) and warfare devices were iron-on or embroidered. The rate badges consisted of an all-black eagle (nicknamed a "crow") and chevrons, and omitted the rating device found on other enlisted uniforms' rate badges.

Low black leather boots called "boondockers" were issued with the dungaree uniform; however, sailors were allowed to wear black leather jump boots. Flight deck personnel were issued a type of taller cap-toe boot similar in design to jump boots known colloquially as "wing walkers". Boots of this type had zig-zag patterned out-soles to avoid gathering FOD (Foreign Object Debris) between the ridges that could litter the flight deck and cause potential damage to aircraft. "Dealer/Chelsea" style ankle boots (known colloquially as Lox boots) with elastic sides instead of laces were issued as protective clothing to personnel working with liquid oxygen to allow quick removal.

=== Utilities ===
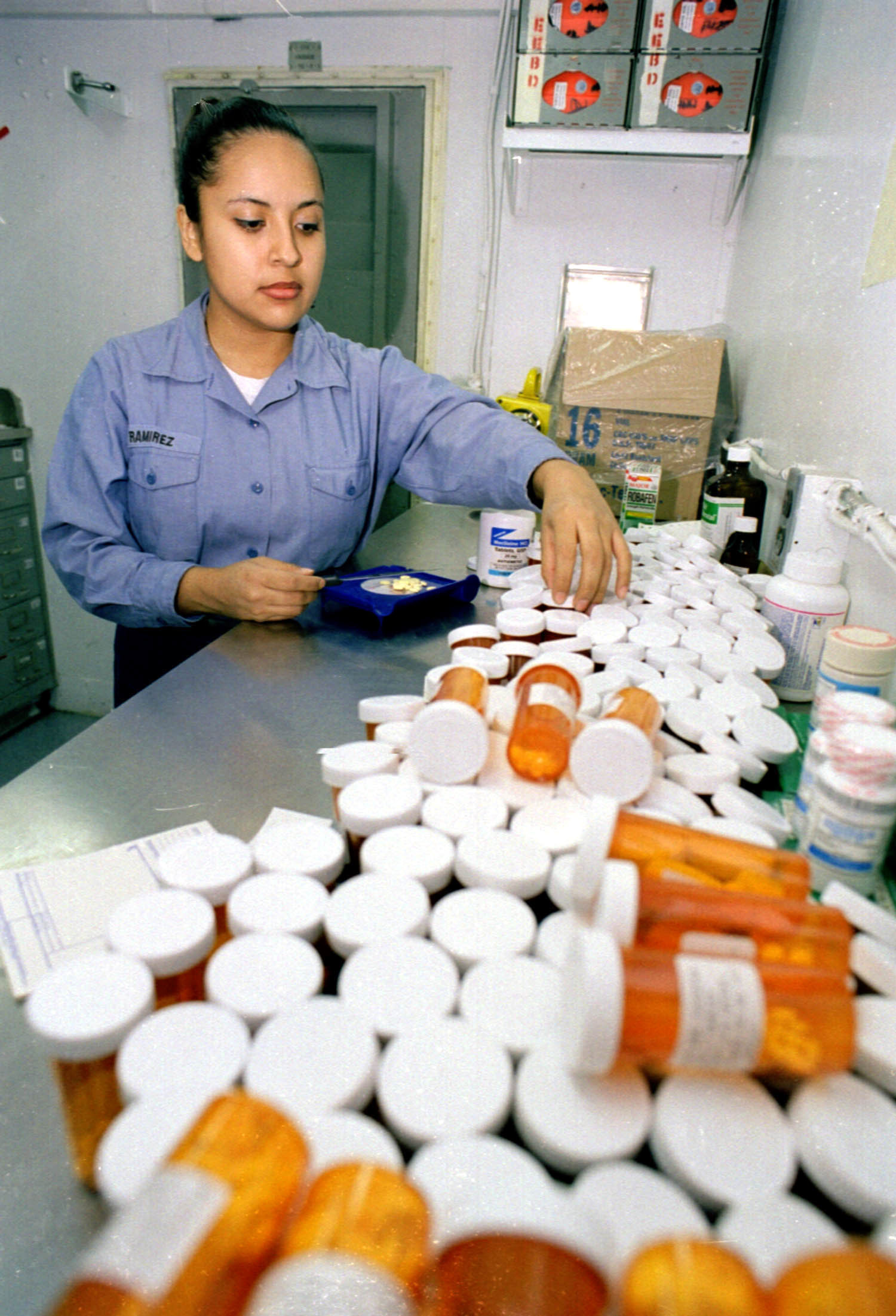
A navy corpsman in 1999 wearing the "dungaree" uniform

The enlisted utilities uniform was worn by junior enlisted sailors, from paygrades E-1 to E-6, from mid 1973 until 2010, when they were phased out in favor of the NWU. Utilities consisted of dark blue chino cloth trousers with a polyester–cotton blend shirt, and were considered an updated version of the dungarees uniform of which they shared an aesthetic similarity. Utilities were meant to be worn in a working environment but were authorized to be worn outside military installations, unlike coveralls.

Usually sailors wore the command ball cap with this uniform, although a black watch cap was allowed in cold weather; the white "dixie cup" hat was worn for special ceremonies such as the dignified transfer of a decedent. Cloth name tapes were worn similar to that used on utility uniforms of the other services. In 1995 a tape with the words "U.S. NAVY" began being included above the left breast pocket with embroidered enlisted warfare insignia authorized above it, and an embroidered rating badge. The footwear for this uniform was full black, round-toed boots (referred to as boondockers), preferably with steel toes. The blue utility jacket was authorized in climates not cold enough as to warrant wearing the black All-Weather Coat.

=== Enlisted Undress Blues ===
Prior to the introduction of the Winter Blue/Winter Working Blue uniform, personnel E-6 and below in office and classroom environments were authorized to wear the Undress Blue uniform; this broadly resembled the Dress Blue "crackerjack" uniform but carried no piping or stars, and the sleeves were wide and cuffless. Before 1941 this was the standard working uniform for all "above-deck" duties since dungarees were not permitted anywhere the public might see them. Ribbons and neckerchief were not worn and the uniform was not authorized for liberty.

=== Enlisted Dress Whites (prewar) ===
Until 1941, the summer and tropical equivalent to the Dress Blue "crackerjacks" was a white cotton jumper uniform with blue collar and cuffs. The elongated, "tar-flap" collar was adorned with white piping and stars like the blue uniform. This uniform was discontinued "for the duration" and was never reinstated; instead the Undress Whites with the addition of ribbons and neckerchief became the summer dress uniform for sailors.

=== The "Flat Hat" ===
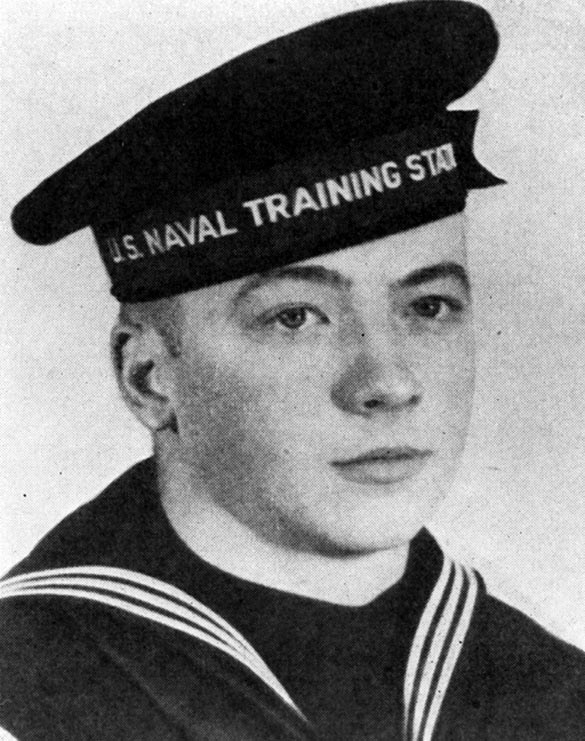
U.S. Navy sailor James R. Ward wearing the Flat Hat (1940 or 1941)

From 1852 until 1962 (although in practice rarely worn after the middle of World War II), enlisted sailors were issued a round, flat blue wool sailor hat with a ribbon around the band similar to that worn by the Royal Navy. The "Donald Duck" was worn with the Service Dress Blue uniform on more formal occasions in lieu of the white "Dixie cup." The ribbon carried the name of the wearer's ship or station embroidered in gold until 1941, when this was replaced with a generic "U.S. Navy" as a wartime security measure.

=== The "bucket" cover ===
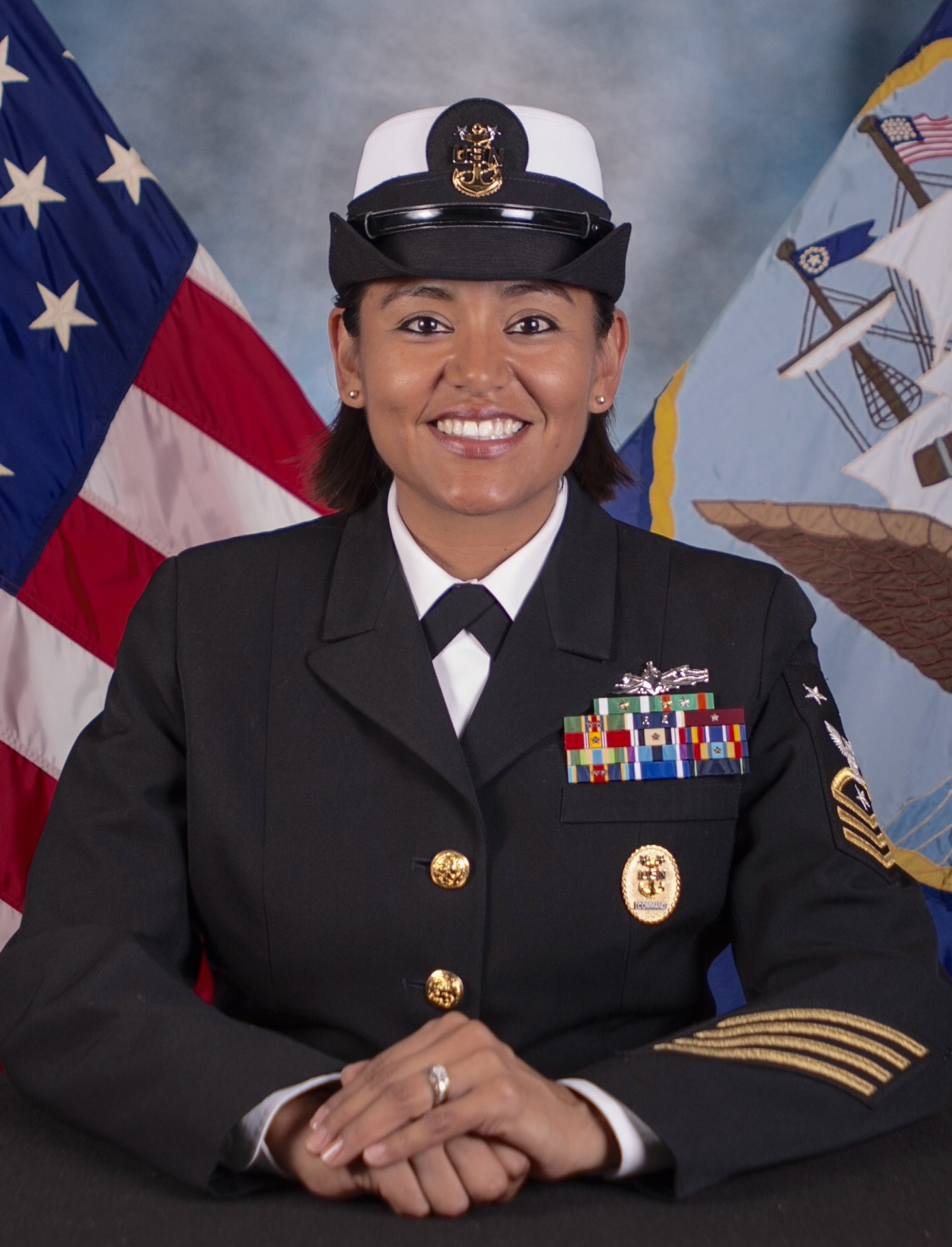
U.S. Navy Command Master Chief Veronica Holliday wearing the "Bucket" Cover (8 September 2015)

From 1940 until 2018, U.S. Navy female officers and chief petty officers were issued a distinctive service cap known as the "bucket" cover. Its use was discontinued in favor of a peaked cap similar to the one used by males. These covers were later re-authorized for uniform wear in February 2024 as a secondary, optional item.

== See also ==
- Badges of the United States Navy
- United States Navy officer rank insignia
- List of United States Navy staff corps (insignia)
- List of United States Navy ratings
- United States Navy enlisted rate insignia
- List of camouflage patterns#North America N-Z
- Uniforms of the United States Military
- Uniforms of the United States Marine Corps
