= GCV =

GCV may refer to:

- United States Navy good conduct variation
- Grand Cross of Valour, an honour of Rhodesia
- Gross calorific value
- Ground Combat Vehicle, a cancelled armored fighting vehicle design of the United States
- Generalized Cross Validation, a technique in statistics
