= Good conduct variation =

United States Navy decoration

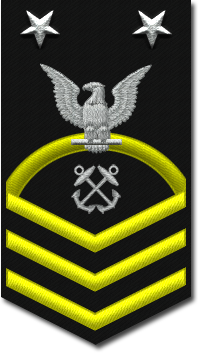
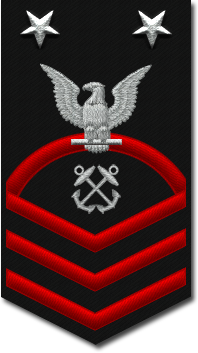
Rate insignia for a master chief boatswain's mate
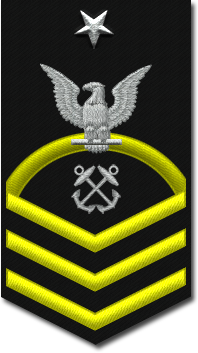
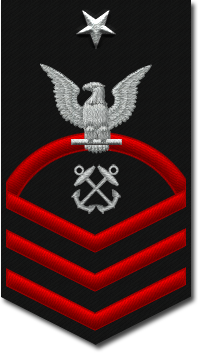
Rate insignia for a senior chief boatswain's mate
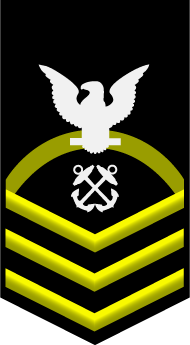
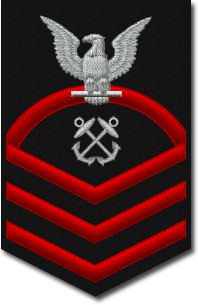
Rate insignia for a chief boatswain's mate
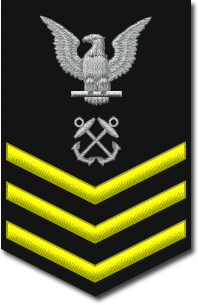
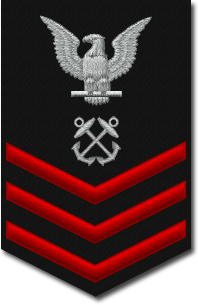
Rate insignia for a boatswain's mate first class
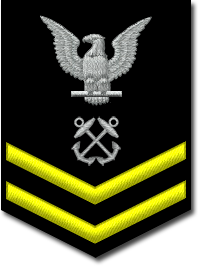
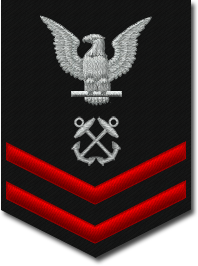
Rate insignia for a boatswain's mate second class
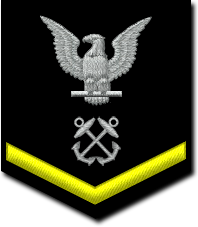
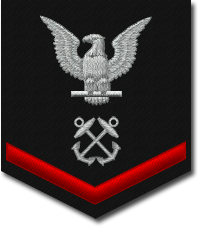
Rate insignia for a boatswain's mate third class

In the United States Navy prior to June 2019, enlisted Sailors in pay grades E-4 to E-9 were authorized to wear golden rate insignia instead of red if they met the requirements for good conduct service. Those Sailors in paygrades E-4 to E-6 who had met good conduct service requirements were also authorized to wear collar insignia and cap devices with gold chevrons on their service uniforms. On 1 June 2019, golden rate insignia began to be worn by all Sailors with 12 years of service or more, regardless of disciplinary history.

== History ==
=== Gold rating badge and service stripes ===
Navy Sailors whose most recent twelve years of naval active or active reserve service had met requirements for Good Conduct Service (that which met minimum requirements for performance, conduct and evaluation marks for the Good Conduct Award) wore gold rating badges and gold service stripes on dress blue uniforms, dinner dress blue uniforms and dinner dress blue/white jacket uniforms. The twelve years may have been active or drilling reserve time in the Navy, Navy Reserve, and Navy units attached to Marine Corps, or Marine Corps Forces Reserve units. Times excluded were for that spent in the delayed entry program, inactive reserve, and broken service.

=== Continued wearing of gold ===
Once qualified to wear the gold rating badge and gold service stripes, the qualification continues through the duration of an enlisted person's service, providing they continued to meet minimum conduct, performance, and evaluation mark requirements for a Good Conduct Medal or Naval Reserve Meritorious Service Award. On the date the individual fails to meet the minimum standards, the gold rating badge and gold service stripes were to be removed from the uniform. Additionally, if an individual is convicted by court-martial or Non-judicial punishment (NJP), the gold badge and gold service stripes would be removed from the uniform on the date the conviction becomes final within the meaning of Article 76, Uniform Code of Military Justice. The privilege to again wear the gold service stripes/rating badge would only be earned by fulfilling the requirements listed above.

The United States Coast Guard's enlisted rate insignia, while similar to that of the U.S. Navy's, include gold stripes for all chief petty officers (E-7 to E-9) regardless of their disciplinary history. All other ranks wear red stripes.

=== Fleet reserve personnel ===
Fleet reserve personnel may wear the gold rating badges and service stripes authorized at the time of their transfer to the fleet reserve. For fleet reserve personnel returning to active duty, fleet reserve time is considered broken time for the purpose of determining authorized additional service stripes, and qualifying to wear gold sleeve insignia.

=== E-4 Good Conduct Variation ===
The petty officer third class good conduct variation was very rare in the U.S. Navy as it was uncommon for a Sailor with 12 years of good conduct to have not been promoted beyond that paygrade. For more information on this rarity, see petty officer third class good conduct variation.

=== Discontinuation ===
In March 2019, it was announced by the Deputy Chief of Naval Operations for Manpower, Personnel, Training and Education that starting on 1 June 2019, golden rate insignia will be worn by all enlisted Sailors with 12 years of service or more, regardless of disciplinary history.
