= Electronics technician (armed forces) =

Occupation in the armed forces of various countries

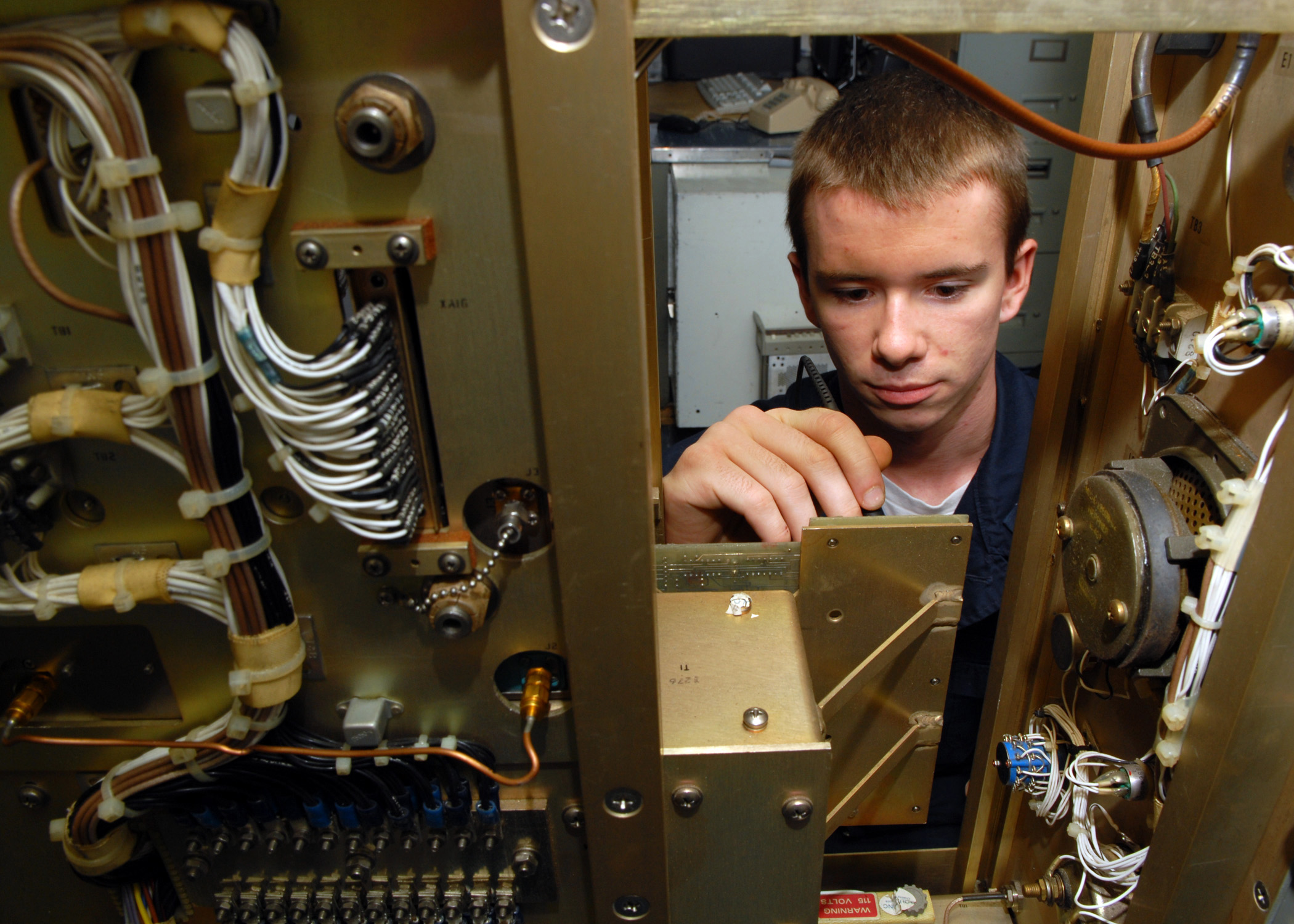
Electronics Technician performing a voltage check on a power circuit card in the air navigation equipment room aboard the aircraft carrier USS Abraham Lincoln (CVN-72).

Electronics Technician (ET) is a common enlisted occupation in the armed forces of many countries. Common duties for ETs include repair, calibration, and basic maintenance of most electronic equipment.

== Australian Defence Force ==
In the Australian Defence Force, there are several types of Electronics Technicians.

The Royal Australian Navy has three different Electronics Technician positions. Electronics Technicians maintain missile systems, navigational systems, radars along with various other things. The navy also has Avionics Technicians, they are trained to maintain communication, navigation, safety and weapons systems of the Navy's helicopters. Electronics Technician Submariners maintain electrical system so submarines, these include torpedo-firing systems, navigational equipment along with communications equipment.

The Australian Army has two different Electronics Technician positions. Electronic Systems Technicians inspect, repair and maintain various army assets including weapons systems, radios and vehicles. Telecommunications Technicians install and maintain the telecommunications systems used to keep communication between different parts of the army, this includes radios, microwaves, satellites and fiber optic cabling.

The Royal Australian Air Force has Communication Electronic Technicians. People in these positions maintain and repair systems that provide views of surrounding airspace.

== British Army ==
In the British Army, Electronic Technicians maintain a large array of the army's military equipment, this includes vehicles, weapons, communications systems and medical equipment. In these positions one earns a basic then an advanced apprenticeship and can obtain a degree of engineering later on in their carrier.

== Canadian Armed Forces ==
In the Canadian Armed Forces, there are several types of Electronics Technicians. All of these positions have to with maintain and repairing electrical systems in various parts of the Canadian Armed Forces, with some also responsible for installing portable and non-portable electrical systems of various types, primarily for land use.

Electronic-Optronic Technicians are trained to maintain and repair ammunition (fire) control systems for the Canadian Army.

Avionics Systems Technicians are responsible for maintaining all electrical systems on all Canadian Armed Forces aircraft.

Electrical Generating Systems Technicians install, run, modify and repair mobile and power plant electrical generators as well as uninterruptible power supplies.

Electrical Distribution Technicians install, maintain and repair high and low voltage electrical distribution systems, airfield lighting systems, fire alarms and security systems.

== New Zealand Army ==
In the New Zealand Army, Electronic Technicians are responsible for maintaining the "eyes and ears" of the Army. They maintain communications systems, night vision and sighting systems, and electronic systems on the army's LAV III fleet.

== United States Navy ==
There are several variations in the United States Navy, including the standard Electronics Technician and Aviation Electronics Technician; there is also the similar Electrician's Mate and Aviation Electrician's Mate. Electronics technician ranking is given by the given by the Bureau of Naval Personnel to enlisted members who satisfactorily complete initial Electronics Technician "A" school training.
