= Mary-Scott Welch =

American writer and magazine editor

- Born: 1919; Chicago, Illinois, U.S.
- Died: September 22, 1995 (aged 75–76); New York City, New York, U.S.
- Education: University of Illinois
- Notable work: Networking: The Great New Way for Women to Get Ahead (1980)
- Spouse: Barrett Welch (m. 1943; died 1981)

Mary-Scott Welch (1919 – September 22, 1995) was an American writer and magazine editor. She worked as a writer for various magazines, specializing in articles about domestic and women's issues, and was an editor for Pageant and Look magazines and editor in chief for Homemaker's Digest. She published the book Networking: The Great New Way for Women to Get Ahead in 1980, which promoted networking amongst women to combat exclusion from opportunities as the result of old boys networks. Welch was an active feminist who was a member of the National Organization for Women.

== Early life ==
Welch was born in Chicago, Illinois, in 1919. She graduated from the University of Illinois, where she was secretary of the student council, president of Kappa Gamma and a recipient of the Phi Beta Kappa key. She was commissioned by the Navy during World War II as a member of the first group of officer candidates to qualify with WAVES at Smith College. She worked as an aid to Admiral W. B. Young as the first woman in the position. In 1943, she married marketing and advertising executive Barrett Welch, with whom she had a son and three daughters. The couple lived in Cincinnati, Ohio, for the first two years of their marriage while her husband was stationed in the city as a captain in the ferry division of the Air Traffic Control. She worked for Esquire and Coronet in Chicago after the war as their news stand promotion manager and later as their west coast representative, when she moved to New York City with the magazine, where she spent the majority of her career.

== Career ==
Welch worked as a freelance magazine writer, publishing work in a variety of publications, including Redbook, Esquire, Ladies' Home Journal, Woman's Day, Vogue, Harper's Bazaar, Reader's Digest and Modern Maturity. She worked as an editor for Pageant and Look magazines and as the editor in chief for Homemaker's Digest. She wrote articles on women's issues, including homemaking and networking, job-hunting and working as a woman. She wrote an article about her daughter's rape and another article about moving back to the city from the suburbs. Welch planned to write a book with Caroline Bird and Catherine Shipe East about women who established legal precedents using Title VII, but it was never published. She wrote books on travel, cooking and etiquette, including Your First Hundred Meals (1948) and The Family Wilderness Handbook (1973).

Her most famous work was Networking: The Great New Way for Women to Get Ahead (Harcourt, 1980). The book was born out of a 1977 article that she was asked to write for Redbook, a list of the ten best corporations to work at for women. She did not find any companies to write about for her article, but she did discover a network of informal arrangements between women who were able to refer her to other women to assist. Welch wrote an article about this phenomenon instead and eventually published the book, which aimed to help women advance their careers when they were unable to rely on the "old boy" networks enjoyed by men. While researching for the book, she discovered internal networks at companies including Exxon, General Electric, NBC, Newsweek, ABC-TV, and Reader's Digest where women could exchange information, invite speakers to lead discussions on topics such as sex discrimination in the workplace and support each other. The book included a directory of women's networks across the country and excerpts were published in Vogue, Glamour, Ms. and Working Woman. The book was the first instance of the use of the word "network" as a verb, and it was credited with promoting the "networking movement" amongst women.

== Activism ==
She was a member of the advisory boards for the Cornell University Institute for Women and Work and the National Organization for Women (NOW). She coordinated the rape prevention movement for NOW during the 1970s. She helped with the Veteran Feminists of America in the organization's early days.

== Death and legacy ==
Welch died from cancer on September 22, 1995, at her house in New York City. Her papers are held in archives at the Schlesinger Library at the Radcliffe Institute for Advanced Study at Harvard University and the American Heritage Center at the University of Wyoming.
