= List of United States Navy ratings =

From left to right: the service dress blue rating badge for a special warfare operator first class and a boatswain's mate second class.

United States Navy ratings are general enlisted occupations used by the U.S. Navy since the 18th century, which denote the specific skills and abilities of the sailor. Each naval rating has its own specialty badge, which is worn on the left sleeve of dress uniforms of enlisted personnel. U.S. naval ratings are the equivalent of military occupational specialty codes (MOS codes) used by the United States Army and the United States Marine Corps, the ratings system used by the United States Coast Guard, and Air Force Specialty Codes (AFSC) used by the United States Air Force and United States Space Force.

Ratings should not be confused with rates, which are used to identify personnel of specific a rating and pay grade. For example, if a sailor has the pay-grade of E-5 (petty officer second class) and the rating of boatswain's mate, then combining the two—boatswain's mate second class (BM2)—defines both pay grade and rating in formal address or epistolary salutation. Thus, boatswain's mate second class (BM2) would be that sailor's rate.

Sailors from pay-grades E-1 to E-3 that have no rates, are considered to be in apprenticeships or training for a rating, thus the slang term "undes" (Pronounced UN-DEZ) (un-designated) when referring to them as a group. A Sailor actively working toward a specific rating is referred to as "striking for a rating" and is called a "striker". E-1 to E-3 are divided into five general occupational fields (airman, constructionman, fireman, hospitalman, or seaman) based on their rate. For example, an AD (Aviation Machinist's Mate) E-3 would be referred to as an Airman, an E-2 as an Airman Apprentice, and E-1 as an Airman Recruit. The paper designation for these is ADAN, ADAA, and ADAR respectively, SN, SA, and SR for sea-going rates, FN, FA, FR for engineering and damage control rates, CN, CA, CR for Seabee, naval construction units, and HN, HA, and HR for Hospital Corpsman.

Naval Officers: Although naval officers do specialize in various fields their occupations are classified according to designators for both officers of the line (i.e., line officers) and those of the professional staff corps.

== History ==
The U.S. Navy's enlisted occupational system was a product of more than 200 years of Naval evolution. The Navy of the United Colonies of the 1775 era offered only a few different jobs above the level of ordinary seaman. These included Boatswain's mate, Quartermaster, and Gunner's Mate. These were titles of the jobs that individuals were actually performing and became the basis for petty officers and ratings. During this time, ship crews were taken from civilian life and enlisted for only one cruise, thus making the job at hand the primary consideration, rather than career possibilities. It was not until 1841 that distinguishing marks for a rating were prescribed in the Regulations of the Secretary of the Navy, but specialty marks were not added to enlisted men's uniforms until 1866. The marks consisted of the tools or instruments used in each rating's specific duty. The Master-at-Arms, the police officer of a ship, wore the star of authority and the Gunner's Mate wore two crossed cannons. Currently, all specialty marks for new ratings are approved by the Permanent Naval Uniform Board, which is a division of the Bureau of Naval Personnel.

As the U.S. Navy's rating system changed so did the U.S. Navy. The first steamship, mine, radar, torpedo, aircraft carrier, and many other "firsts" all established a new era in the Navy, and each directly impacted the enlisted occupation structure. During World War II, the U.S. Navy also briefly maintained a rating of "Specialist", similar to the rank in the U.S. Army. The rating of "Specialist" was discontinued in 1948.

Since the establishment of the rating system, the U.S. Navy enlisted rating structure played a key role in career development, serving as a basis for training, detailing, advancement, and simply keeping tabs on several hundred thousand sailors.

=== Temporary end of ratings ===
Beginning in June 2016, at the express direction of then Secretary of the Navy Ray Mabus, the then Master Chief Petty Officer of the Navy, Michael D. Stevens, oversaw a review of the Navy's existing enlisted rating system. After Stevens's retirement, a group of senior enlisted leaders came to the conclusion that the Navy needed to replace its current enlisted system and announced the changes on 29 September 2016 with the release of NAVADMIN 218/16. The changes would have eliminated ratings in favor of the generic titles of "Seaman" (E-1 to E-3) or "Petty Officer" (E-4 to E-6) and accompanying Navy Occupational Specialty (NOS) codes. The Navy stated that the decision was motivated by a desire to assist former sailors in obtaining employment after their naval service by making naval job titles more congruent with their civilian counterparts, as well as to make said titles more unisex.

However, the "overwhelmingly unpopular decision" was not well received as many sailors had grown accustomed and attached to their ratings, viewing them as a source of morale. Further, they had no desire to be unisex. In response to widespread criticism, ratings were reinstated with immediate effect on 20 December 2016. Former CNO Admiral John Richardson indicated he still intended to change the personnel system in the future; however, he stepped down in 2019, and there has since been no change.

== Rating structure ==
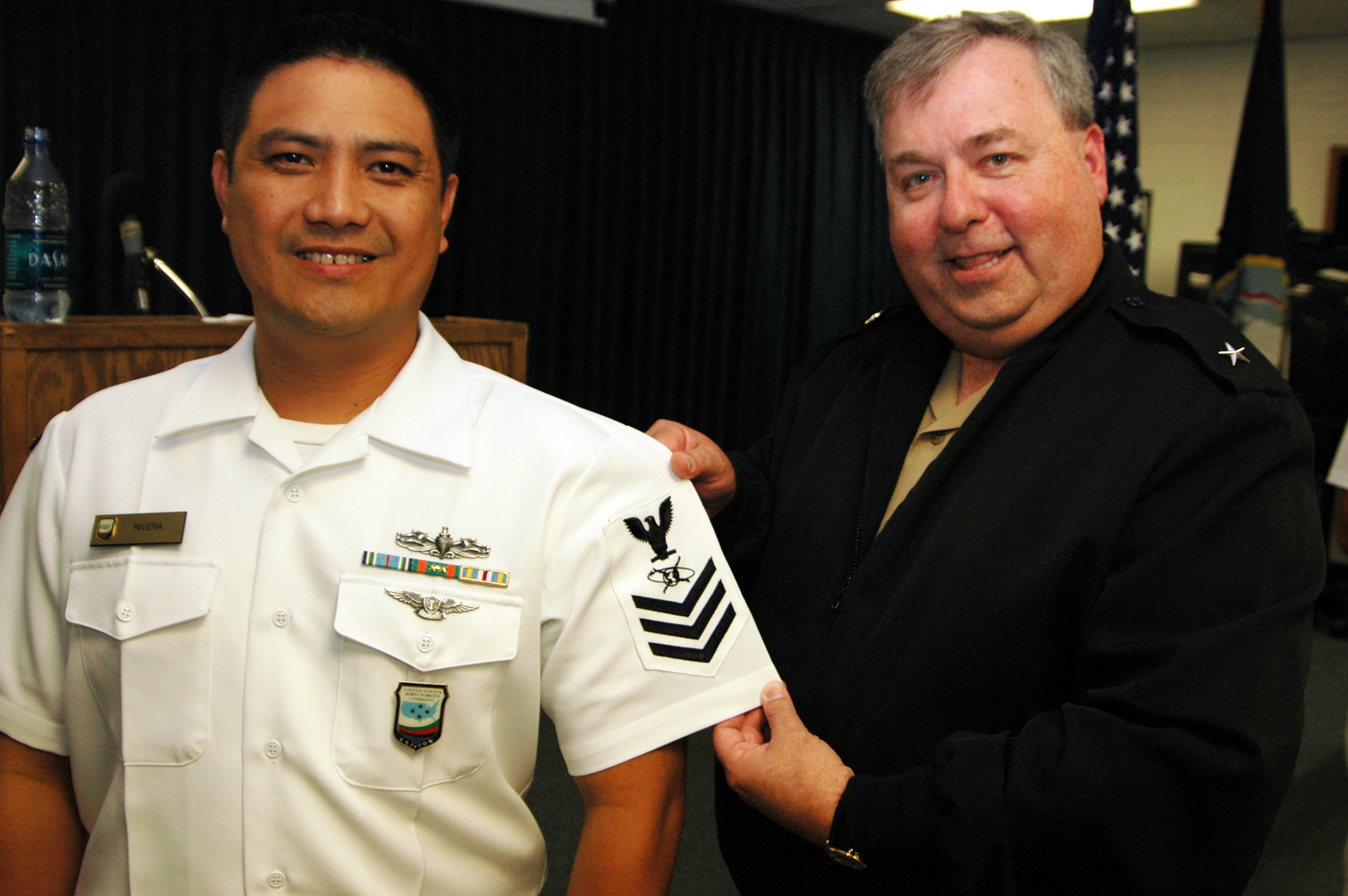
Rear Admiral Terry McCreary presenting a rating insignia of a mass communication specialist first class (MC1).

The pay grades E-4 (petty officer third class) through E-9 (master chief petty officer) fall within the rating structure. It is further broken down into four types of ratings and classifications:

- 57 General ratings: consisting of broad occupational fields such as boatswain's mate, electronics technician, machinist's mate, fire controlman, etc.
- 37 Service ratings: which are made up of sub categories of general ratings that require further specialized training and qualifications. Service ratings are established, changed, or removed depending on service requirements and changes in the way personnel are managed.
- 4 Compression ratings (AF, AV, CU, CB): Identify the combining of several general or service ratings at paygrade E-9 (E-8 for CU) to form broader career fields when the occupational content is similar. These ratings exist only at the E-8/E-9 levels and are not identified previously as a general or service rating.
- Navy Enlisted Classifications (NEC), which are alphanumeric codes attached to a specific rating and are frequently used to indicate specialized qualifications and Emergency ratings.
- Emergency ratings, which are specific ratings that can be established in time of war and are distinguished by a letter of the alphabet enclosed in a diamond.

Paygrades E-1 through E-3 can also have a rating abbreviation preceding their paygrade symbol if they are graduates of Class "A" schools; have received the rating designation in a previous enlistment; are assigned to a billet in that specialty as a striker; have passed an advancement examination and not been selected for advancement for reasons of numeric limitations on advancements; or have been reduced in rate because of punishment. Examples: BMSR is a boatswain's mate seaman recruit (paygrade E-1); MMFA is a machinist's mate fireman apprentice (paygrade E-2); EOCN is an equipment operator constructionman (paygrade E-3). HN is hospitalman, which is a hospital corpsman with the paygrade of E-3.

== Aviation ratings ==
Insignia	General rating	Abbreviation	Service rating	Abbreviation
	Aviation boatswain's mate	AB^{[I]}	(Launching & Recovery) (Fuels) (Aircraft Handling)	ABE; ABF; ABH
Aviation Boatswain's Mates are responsible for aircraft catapults, arresting gear and barricades. They operate fuel and lube oil transfer systems, as well as direct aircraft on the flight deck and in hangar bays before launch and after recovery. They use tow tractors to position planes and operate support equipment used to start aircraft.
	Air traffic controller	AC		
Air Traffic Controllers assist with the speedy flow of air traffic by directing and controlling aircraft. They operate field lighting systems and communicate with aircraft. They furnish pilots with information regarding traffic, navigation, and weather conditions, as well as operate and adjust ground-controlled approach (GCA) systems and interpret targets on radar screens and plot aircraft positions.
	Aviation Machinist's Mate	AD^{[II]}		
Aviation Machinist's Mates are usually assigned to billets concerned with the maintenance of turbo-jet aircraft engines and associated equipment. They are responsible for the maintenance and replacement of aircraft engines and accessories, as well as performing the duties of flight engineers.
	Aviation Electrician's Mate	AE^{[III]}		
Aviation Electrician's Mates are responsible for aircraft electrical power generating and converting systems. They maintain lighting, control, and indicating systems and can install as well as maintain flight and engine instrument systems.
	Aerographer's Mate	AG		
Aerographer's Mates are the U.S. Navy's weather forecasters. They are trained in meteorology and the use of aerological instruments that monitor air pressure, temperature, humidity, wind speed, and direction. They prepare weather maps and forecasts and can analyze atmospheric conditions to determine the best flight levels for aircraft. An AG can measure wind and air density to aid the accuracy of anti-aircraft firing, shore bombardment and delivery of weapons by aircraft.
	Aviation Structural Mechanic	AM^{[II]}	(Safety Equipment) (Hydraulics and Structures)	AME; AM
Aviation Structural Mechanics are responsible for the maintenance of many aircraft parts such as wings, fuselage, tail, control surfaces, landing gear, and hydraulic systems. AME's maintain and repair oxygen, cockpit and cabin pressurization, and ejection seat systems.
	Aviation Ordnanceman	AO		
Aviation Ordnancemen operate and handle aviation ordnance equipment. They are responsible for the maintenance of guns, bombs, torpedoes, rockets, and missiles. Their duties include the stowing, issuing, and loading of munitions and small arms.
	Aviation Support Equipment Technician	AS		
Aviation Support Equipment Technicians perform intermediate maintenance on aviation accessory equipment at naval air stations and aboard aircraft carriers. They maintain gasoline and diesel engines, gas turbine compressor units and electrical systems.
	Aviation electronics technician	AT^{[III]}		
Aviation Electronics Technicians are responsible for the maintenance of radars, avionics, and navigation systems at all times. They do checks on equipment, and calibration of many aviation electronics systems on a regular basis.
	Naval Aircrewman	AW	(Operator) (Mechanical) (Avionics) (Helicopter) (Tactical Helicopter)	AWO; AWF; AWV; AWS; AWR
Naval Aircrewman operate airborne radar and electronic equipment used in detecting, locating, and tracking submarines. They provide information for aircraft and surface navigation and act as helicopter-rescue crewmen, and function as part of the flight crew on long-range and intermediate-range aircraft.
	Aviation Maintenance Administrationman	AZ		
Aviation Maintenance Administrationmen perform clerical, administrative, and managerial duties necessary to keep aircraft maintenance activities running smoothly. They schedule and coordinate the maintenance workload, including inspections and modifications to aircraft and equipment.
	Aircrew Survival Equipmentman	PR		
Aircrew Survival Equipmentmen are responsible for the packing and care of parachutes. They maintain flight clothing, rubber life rafts, life jackets, oxygen-breathing apparatus, protective clothing, and air-sea rescue equipment. The abbreviation comes from the former official title (still used informally) of parachute rigger.

=== Aviation ratings notes ===
I: ABE, ABF, and ABH combine at paygrade E-9 to the rate of Master Chief Aviation Boatswain's Mate (ABCM).
II: AM and AME combine at paygrade E-8 to the rate of Senior Chief Structural Mechanic (AMCS); AM, AME, and AD combine at paygrade E-9 to the rate of Master Chief Aircraft Maintenanceman (AFCM).
III: AE and AT combine at paygrade E-9 to the rate of Master Chief Avionics Technician (AVCM).
IV: In 2008, the AW rating merged with all other aircrew NECs and changed their title from aviation warfare system operators to naval aircrewman.

== Construction ratings ==
Insignia	General rating	Abbreviation	Service rating	Abbreviation
	Builder	BU^{[I]}^{[IV]}		
Navy builders are like civilian construction workers. They are skilled carpenters, plasterers, roofers, cement finishers, asphalt workers, masons, and painters. They build and repair all types of structures including: piers, bridges, towers, schools, offices, houses, and other buildings.
	Construction Electrician	CE^{[II]}^{[IV]}		
Construction Electricians are responsible for the power production and electrical work required to build and operate airfields, roads, barracks, and hospitals. The work of a CE is equivalent to civilian construction electricians, telephone and electrical repairmen, lineman, and others.
	Construction Mechanic	CM^{[III]}^{[IV]}		
Construction Mechanics maintain many types of construction machinery including; buses, dump trucks, bulldozers, rollers, cranes, backhoes, and pile drivers. They work on gasoline and diesel engines and transmissions. They also repair electrical, hydraulic, pneumatic and steering systems.
	Engineering Aide	EA^{[I]}^{[IV]}		
Engineering Aides provide construction engineers with information needed to develop final construction plans. They conduct surveys for roads, airfields, buildings, etc. They perform soil tests, prepare topographic and hydrographic maps. They also survey for sewers, water lines, drainage systems and underwater excavations.
	Equipment Operator	EO^{[III]}^{[IV]}		
Equipment Operators work with heavy machinery such as bulldozers, power shovels, pile drivers, etc. They use this machinery to dig ditches, excavate for building foundations, break up old concrete or asphalt paving and pour new paving. They grade and remove debris from construction sites, raise girders, and move and set in place other pieces of equipment or materials needed for the job.
	Steelworker	SW^{[I]}^{[IV]}		
Steelworkers rig and operate all special equipment used to move or hoist structural steel, structural shapes and similar material. They erect and dismantle steel bridges, piers, buildings, storage tanks, etc. They work with steel shapes, plates and built-up sections used in the construction of overseas facilities. They are skilled in arc welding, MIG welding, TIG welding, and gas welding.
	Utilitiesman	UT^{[II]}^{[IV]}		
Utilitiesmen supervise and perform tasks involved in the installation and maintenance of plumbing, steam, compressed air and fuel storage and distribution systems. They maintain air conditioning and refrigeration equipment, as well as sewage collecting and disposal facilities.

=== Construction ratings notes ===
I: BU, EA, and SW combine, as follows:

- at paygrade E-8 to the rating of Senior Chief Constructionman (CUCS)
- before NAVADMIN 054/21; at paygrade E-9 to the rating of Master Chief Constructionman (CUCM).

II: Before NAVADMIN 054/21; CE and UT combine at paygrade E-9 to the rating of Master chief Utilitiesman (UCCM).
III: Before NAVADMIN 054/21; CM and EO combine at paygrade E-9 to the rating of Master chief equipmentman (EQCM).

IV: Per NAVADMIN 054/21: Constructionman Master Chief (CUCM), Equipmentman Master Chief (EQCM) and Utilities Constructionman Master Chief (UCCM) [E-9 paygrades] rating names, all change to Seabee Master Chief (CBCM). The change applies to Active-Duty and Selected Reserve Sailors. Those Master Chiefs already in CUCM, EQCM or UCCM ratings were to be automatically converted to CBCM on 15 March 2021, but current source ratings badges were to be retained.

== Medical rating ==
Insignia	General rating	Abbreviation	Service rating	Abbreviation
	Hospital Corpsman	HM		
Hospital Corpsmen are medical professionals who provide health care to service people and their families. They serve as pharmacy technicians, medical technicians, nurse's aides, physician's or dentist's assistants, battlefield corpsman (8404), and more. All work falls into several categories: first aid and minor surgery, patient transportation, patient care, prescriptions and laboratory work, food service inspections, and clerical duties. Also issued to corpsmen attached to Marine Corps units.

== General ratings ==
Insignia	General rating	Abbreviation	Service rating	Abbreviation
	Boatswain's Mate	BM		
Boatswain's Mates train and supervise personnel in all activities relating to marlinspike, deck, and boat seamanship, and oversee the maintenance of the ship's external structure and deck equipment. They act as petty officers in charge of small craft and may perform duties as master-at-arms, serve in or take charge of gun crews, and damage control parties. Boatswain's Mates are also responsible for the "deck side" watch. In port, three of the crew are on deck watch 24/7 (in hazardous areas such as war zones there are more than three, depending on ship's size). They are the Officer of the Deck, Boatswain's Mate of the watch, and Messenger of the Watch (usually a Seaman or Seaman Apprentice). They are stationed very close to the gangway and monitor all the comings and goings of persons to and from the ship. At sea the boatswain's mate of the watch is within ear shot of the conning officer (on the bridge). The boatswain's mate of the watch supervises the rest of the enlisted watch standers on deck. They include helmsman, messenger of the watch, and all the look outs. In port or at sea the boatswain's mate of the watch is charged with the responsibility of making all announcements to the crew; everything from chow call to general quarters (battle stations).
	Culinary Specialist	CS	(Surface) (Subsurface)	CS CSS
Culinary Specialists prepare menus and order food items. They operate galley and dining facilities, manage large facilities, keep records for food supplies and financial budgets, and can even serve as flight attendant aircrewmen. They can also serve as a personal food service specialist, household/estate manager or chef for an admiral, the First Family, President of the United States at Camp David and the White House, to the Vice President at Number One Observatory Circle or for a commanding officer aboard ship or at shore bases. Ashore, Culinary Specialists often manage and maintain clubs, TAD hotels and Permanent Party naval barracks.
	Cryptologic Technician	CT^{[I]}	(Interpretive) (Maintenance) (Collection) (Technical)	CTI; CTM; CTR; CTT
Cryptologic Technicians control the flow of messages and information and also conduct electronic warfare. Their work depends on their specific branch: CTAs or administration cryptologic technicians perform administrative and clerical duties that control access to classified material. CTIs or interpretive cryptologic technicians handle radiotelephone communications and foreign language translation. CTMs or maintenance cryptologic technicians maintain electronic and electromechanical equipment. CTRs or collection cryptologic technicians handle all Morse code communications and operate radio direction-finding equipment. Finally, CTTs or technical cryptologic technicians deal with electronic warfare. CTTs are the first line of defense against inbound threats and anti-ship missiles. They also collect, analyze, and provide electronic intelligence support to commands throughout the world.
	Cyber Warfare Technician	CWT		
A Cyber Warfare Technician (formerly known as Cryptologic Technician Networks), fights in the battlespace of the future. They use state-of-the-art tech to perform offensive and defensive cyber operations, investigating and tracking enemies while also protecting networks from attacks.
	Explosive Ordnance Disposal	EOD		
Explosive Ordnance Disposal Technicians locate, identify, render safe and dispose of all forms of ordnance (conventional, nuclear, chemical, biological, military, and improvised) both U.S. and foreign made. Parachute or helicopter insertion and deep-sea diving capabilities are sometimes necessary to perform this mission. In addition to working closely with other military services, EOD technicians occasionally assist civilian law enforcement agencies.
	Electronics Technician	ET	Surface; Nuclear Power; Submarine, Navigation; Submarine, Communications	ET; ETN; ETV; ETR
Electronics Technicians are responsible for electronic equipment used to send and receive messages, detect enemy planes and ships, and determine target distances. They maintain, repair, and calibrate all electronic equipment used for communications, detection tracking, identification, and navigation. Specially qualified electronics technicians are employed onboard nuclear-powered ships to operate the nuclear reactor and maintain its control subsystems.
	Fire Controlman	FC	Conventional Non-Conventional (Aegis)	FC FCA
Fire Controlmen (FC's) maintain the control mechanism used in weapons systems on combat ships. Complex electronic, electrical and hydraulic equipment is required to ensure the accuracy of Navy guided-missile and surface gunfire-control systems. They are responsible for the operation, routine care and repair of this equipment, which includes radars, computers, weapons direction equipment, target designation systems, gyroscopes and rangefinders. Fire controlman - Aegis (FCA's) maintain the Aegis Combat System, an integrated naval weapons system on the Ticonderoga-class cruiser and the Arleigh Burke-class destroyer.
	Fire Control Technician	FT		
Fire Control Technicians maintain the electronic equipment used in submarine weapons systems. They are responsible for the operation and maintenance of the complex electronic, electrical and mechanical equipment required to ensure the accuracy of Navy guided-missile systems and underwater weapons. They are responsible for boat safety by recognizing and analyzing data from several critical systems including sonar, radar, periscope, radio, and torpedo inputs.
	Gunner's Mate	GM		
Gunner's Mates operate and maintain all gunnery equipment, guided-missile launching systems, rocket launchers, guns, turrets, and associated equipment. They repair electrical, electronic, hydraulic and mechanical systems, and make detailed casualty analysis. They test ammunition, missiles and their ordnance components. GMs train and supervise personnel in the handling and stowage of ammunition, missiles, and assigned ordnance equipment.
	Intelligence Specialist	IS		
Intelligence Specialists are involved in collecting and interpreting intelligence especially secret information about enemies or potential enemies. They analyze photographs and prepare charts, maps, and reports that describe in detail the strategic situation all over the world.
	Information systems technician	IT	(Surface) (Subsurface) (Electronic Warfare) (Communications) (Network)	IT ITS ITE ITR ITN
Information Systems Technicians design, install, operate, and maintain state-of-the-art information systems. This technology includes local and wide area networks, mainframe, mini and microcomputer systems and associated peripheral devices. They also write programs to handle the collection, manipulation, and distribution of data for a wide variety of applications and requirements. They perform the functions of a computer system analyst, operate telecommunications systems including automated networks and the full spectrum of data links and circuits. While onboard submarines, they are split into three ratings: ITE (Electronic Warfare), ITR (Communications) and ITN (Network)
	Legalman	LN		
Legalmen are the Navy's paralegals. They assist Staff Judge Advocates in the proper administration of military justice and administrative law, such as courts-martial, nonjudicial punishment, and administrative separation. They work in Region Legal Service Offices (RLSO), Defense Service Offices, aboard aircraft carriers and large amphibious ships, and at various independent duty locations. Legalmen assist service members, retirees, and their family members with powers of attorney, wills, tax returns, voter registration procedures, immigration and customs regulations, Social Security regulations, and veterans' benefits.
	Logistics Specialist	LS	(Surface) (Subsurface)	LS LSS
Logistics Specialists manage inventories and issuance of repair parts/general supplies and specialized supplies (e.g., personal flight gear for naval aircrews or specialized combat equipment for Navy SEALs or Naval Military Construction Battalion "Seabees"), as well as distribute mail for naval ships, submarines, aviation squadrons, and shore-based activities. They procure, receive, store and issue material and repair selected components. They utilize financial accounting and database systems to perform inventory and financial management functions. Additionally, they sort and distribute all official and personal mail, manage money order and stamp inventories, and maintain financial and inventory reports.
	Master-at-Arms	MA		
Masters-at-Arms uphold law and order aboard ships, shore stations, control access to naval installations, and deploy overseas with expeditionary forces and squadrons performing antiterrorism/force protection (AT/FP) duties. The basic duty of an MA is to enforce rules and regulations, maintain good order and discipline, and protect life and property. Some other duties include conducting criminal investigations, personal protective services, take part in correctional and rehabilitative programs, military working dog (MWD) handlers, small arms instruction, lethal and non-lethal weapons training, and organize and train sailors assigned to shore patrol police duty. Their equivalents in the civilian world are detectives, security guards, and policemen.
	Mass Communication Specialist	MC		
Mass Communication Specialists are public affairs and visual information experts. They present the U.S. Navy story to audiences in the Navy and to the rest of the world through a variety of media. Mass communication specialists write and produce print and broadcast journalism, news, and feature stories for military and civilian newspapers, magazines, television and radio broadcast stations. They record still and video photography of military operations, exercises, and other Navy events.
	Mineman	MN		
Minemen test, maintain, and repair mines and their components. They are responsible for assembling, testing, and delivering mines to the planting agent. They maintain minehandling and minelaying equipment. At sea, minemen primarily man Avenger Class mine countermeasures ships as well the new Independence Class littoral combat ships as a part of the MCM module. Their duties at sea include but are not limited to: operating mine hunting sonar, operating remote controlled submersibles in prosecuting mine-like contacts, rigging and deploying minesweeping gear as well as standing normal underway deck and combat information center watches.
	Missile technician	MT		
Missile Technicians operate and maintain the UGM-133 Trident II D5 missile Strategic Weapon System (SWS) carried aboard ballistic missile submarines and at strategic weapons facilities. Missile technicians operate and maintain electronic, mechanical, hydraulic and pneumatic strategic weapon subsystems, test and operate the MK98 fire-control system and MK 6 guidance system, perform classified targeting operations, and provide physical security to nuclear weapon systems.
	Musician	MU		
Musicians play in official Navy bands and special groups such as jazz bands, dance bands and small ensembles. They give concerts and provide music for military ceremonies, religious services, parades, receptions and dances. Official unit bands usually do not include stringed instruments, but each musician must be able to play at least one brass, woodwind or percussion instrument. Sailors are selected for this rating through auditions.
	Navy Counselor	NC	(Career) (Recruiter)	NC(C); NC(R)
Navy Counselors offer vocational guidance to Navy personnel — individually and in groups — aboard ships and at shore facilities. They assess the interests, aptitudes, abilities and personalities of individuals and assist them in reaching their full potential. They are responsible directly to the command triumvirate (CO, XO, CMC) and report on many items such as retention, attrition, advancement, testing and various other facets of the career development program. Additionally, it is their keen eye and attention to detail that ensure personnel throughout the command are updated on current Navy policies in regards to career management, off duty education and administrative procedures, among various other responsibilities.
	Operations specialist	OS		
Operations Specialists operate radar, navigation and communications equipment in the shipboard combat information centers (CICs) or bridges. They detect and track ships, planes, and missiles. They operate and maintain identification friend or foe (IFF) systems, electronic countermeasures (ECM) equipment and radio-telephones. They control and assist aircraft.
	Personnel Specialist	PS		
Personnel Specialists provide enlisted personnel with information and counseling about Navy jobs, opportunities for general education and training, and promotion requirements. They assist enlisted members' families with legal aid or reassignments in hardship situations. Personnel Specialists keep records up to date, prepare reports, type letters and maintain files.
	Quartermaster	QM^{[III]}		
Quartermasters assist the navigator and officer of the deck (OOD), steer the ship, take radar bearings and ranges, make depth soundings and celestial observations, plot courses and command small craft.
	Religious Program Specialist	RP		
Religious Program Specialists assist Navy chaplains with administrative and budgetary tasks. They serve as custodians of chapel funds, keep religious documents and stay in contact with religious and community agencies. They prepare devotional and religious educational materials, set up volunteer programs, operate shipboard libraries, supervise chaplains' offices and perform administrative, clerical and secretarial duties. They train personnel in religious programs and publicize religious activities.
	Retail Services Specialist	RS		
Retail Services Specialists manage barber shops, tailor shops, ships' uniform stores, laundries, dry cleaning plants and cobbler shops. They serve as clerks in exchanges, gas stations, warehouses, and commissary stores. Some RSs function as Navy club managers.
	Robotics Warfare Specialist	RW		
Robotics Warfare Specialists enable Robotic and Autonomous System (RAS) operations and maintenance at the tactical edge. RWs are subject matter experts for computer vision, mission autonomy, navigation autonomy, data systems, artificial intelligence and machine learning on RAS platforms.
	Special Warfare Boat Operator	SB		
Special Warfare Boat Operators (SWCC - special warfare combatant-craft crewmen) drive fast speedboats down narrow, winding rivers, or the open ocean while performing high speed, medium range, or all weather insertion/extraction of special operations forces. They participate in maritime interdiction operations, tactical swimmer operations, intelligence collection, operation deception, and coastal patrol.
	Special Warfare Operator	SO		
Special Warfare Operators are Navy SEALs, which are the Navy's primary unconventional warfare units that conduct warfare at SEa, in the Air, and on Land (SEAL). A SEAL's core skills consist of: sniper, breacher, communicator, maritime/engineering, close air support, driver, navigator (rural/urban/protective security), heavy weapons operator, sensitive site exploitation, air operations (parachuting/helicopter insertion, etc.), climber, interrogator, technical surveillance, and advanced special operations. SEALs oversee ocean-borne mine disposal, carry out direct action raids against military targets, conduct reconnaissance, and secure beachheads for invading amphibious forces.
	Sonar Technician	ST	(Surface) (Subsurface)	STG; STS
Sonar Technicians are responsible for underwater surveillance. They assist in safe navigation and are responsible for undersea communications. They operate and repair sonar equipment and auxiliaries. Sonar Technicians operate, maintain and repair sonar systems, antisubmarine warfare fire control equipment and other various equipment associated with underwater detection, counter-detection, warfare and communications.
	Yeoman	YN	(Surface) (Subsurface)	YN YNS
Yeomen perform administrative and clerical work. They deal with visitors, coordinate worldwide travel, submit passport applications, telephone calls and incoming mail, and assist various ships, squadrons, staff commands, and special warfare teams around the world with administrative tasks. They write and type business and social letters, notices, directives, forms and reports.

=== Administration et cetera notes ===
I: Cryptologic Technician now includes former rating of electronic warfare technician (EW).
II: Information Systems Technician now includes former rating of cryptologic technician – communications (CTO).
III: Quartermaster QM now exists as electronics technician (navigation) ETV on submarines.
IIII: LN and RP are also issued to sailors attached to Marine units.

== Engineering and hull ratings ==
Insignia	General rating	Abbreviation	Service rating	Abbreviation
	Damage Controlman	DC^{[I]}		
Damage Controlmen perform the work necessary for damage control, ship stability, fire-fighting. They also prepare defenses against chemical, biological and radiological (CBR) warfare attacks. They instruct personnel in damage control and CBR defense and repair damage-control equipment and systems.
	Electrician's Mate	EM	(Nuclear)	EMN
Electrician's Mates are responsible for the operation and repair of a ship's or station's electrical power plant and electrical equipment. They also maintain and repair power and lighting circuits, distribution switchboards, generators, motors and other electrical equipment. Specially qualified electrician's mates are employed onboard nuclear-powered ships to operate and maintain the electrical power subsystems in nuclear reactors.
	Engineman	EN		
Enginemen are responsible for internal diesel and gasoline engines. They also maintain refrigeration, air-conditioning, distilling-plant engines and compressors.
	Gas Turbine System Technician	GS	(Electrical) (Mechanical)	GSE; GSM
Gas Turbine System Technicians are responsible for all gas turbine engines. They maintain propulsion machinery, including gears, shafting and controllable pitch propellers, assigned auxiliary equipment propulsion control systems, electrical and electronic circuitry up to the printed circuit module, and alarm and warning circuitry. They handle administrative tasks related to gas turbine propulsion system operation and maintenance.
	Hull Maintenance Technician	HT^{[I]}		
Hull Maintenance Technicians are responsible for maintaining ships' hulls, fittings, piping systems and machinery. They install and maintain all shipboard and shore based plumbing and piping systems. They look after a vessel's safety and survival equipment and perform many tasks related to damage control.
	Interior Communications Electrician	IC^{[II]}		
Interior Communications Electricians operate and repair electronic devices used in the ship's interior communications systems, Shipboard Information, Training and Entertainment (SITE) TV systems, 1MC (public address system), electronic megaphones and other announcing equipment. They are responsible for the gyrocompass systems.
	Machinist's Mate	MM	(Nuclear) submarine (Weapons) submarine (Auxiliary)	MMN; MMA
Machinist's Mates are responsible for the continuous operation of the many engines, compressors, gears, refrigeration, and air-conditioning equipment along with other types of machinery on board ships and shore installations. They are responsible for the ship's steam propulsion and auxiliary equipment and the outside (deck) machinery. Specially trained and qualified machinist's mates are deployed onboard nuclear-powered ships to operate and maintain the machinery and piping in nuclear reactors. Some nuclear machinists mates (engineering laboratory technicians) receive additional specialization in health physics and maintaining reactor chemistry.
	Torpedoman's Mate	TM	submarine (Weapons, not SLBMS)	
Torpedoman's Mates are responsible for all phases of weapons loading, unloading and storage on all classes of submarines. This includes torpedoes, Tomahawk missiles and countermeasure devices. A TM works on high pressure air and hydraulic systems to maintain loading and launching capabilities for torpedo and vertical launch tubes.
	Machinery Repairman	MR^{[I]}		
Machinery Repairmen are skilled machine tool operators. They make replacement parts and repair or overhaul a ship's engine auxiliary equipment, such as evaporators, air compressors and pumps. They repair deck equipment, including winches, hoists, condensers, and heat exchange devices. Shipboard machinery repairmen frequently operate main propulsion machinery, besides performing machine shop and repair duties.
	Navy Diver	ND		
Navy divers are responsible for a wide variety of tasks like underwater ship maintenance, construction, and underwater rescue. They are assigned to Naval Special Warfare Units to provide diving technical expertise and supervisory support to all submersible operations. Also issued to sailors attached to Marine units.

=== Engineering and hull ratings notes ===
Prior to March 2014, IC and EM combine at paygrade E-9 to the rating of Master Chief Electrician's Mate (EMCM). After that time, the IC Rating was moved to the Seaman ratings group from the Fireman ratings group. Now, upon selection to E9, ICCS is promoted to ICCM.

== Command ratings ==
Insignia	General rating	Abbreviation
	Command Master Chief Petty Officer	CMDCM
Command Master Chief Petty Officers (CMDCM) are equal in paygrade to Rating Master Chief Petty Officers (MCPOs) but have positional authority within the chief petty officer's mess and the enlisted crew of a United States Navy unit and serve as the senior enlisted advisers to their unit's commanding officer.
	Fleet, Force, or Master Chief Petty Officer of the Navy	FLTCM, FORCM or MCPON
Fleet Master Chief Petty Officers (FLTCMs) and Force Master Chief Petty Officers (FORCMs) are equal in paygrade to MCPOs but have positional authority from a fleet or force level command over all subordinate unit commands' enlisted forces and serve as the senior enlisted advisors to the flag officer fleet/force level Commanders. The Master Chief Petty Officer of the Navy (MCPON) holds positional authority over all subordinate fleet/force/unit commands' enlisted forces and serves as the senior enlisted advisor to the Chief of Navy Operations (CNO).

== Discontinued and changed ratings (1961–present) ==
Insignia	General rating	Abbreviation	Status
	Aviation Storekeeper	AK	Merged into Storekeeper on 1 January 2003.
	Aviation Structural Mechanic (Hydraulics); Aviation Structural Mechanic (Structures)	AMH; AMS	Merged into Aviation Structural Mechanic on 1 March 2001.
	Aviation Support Equipment Technician (Electrical); Aviation Support Equipment Technician (Hydraulics and Structure); Aviation Support Equipment Technician (Mechanical)	ASE; ASH; ASM	Merged into Aviation Support Equipment Technician on 1 March 1990.
	Aviation Antisubmarine Warfare Technician; Aviation Fire Control Technician	AX; AQ	Merged into Aviation Electronics Technician on 1 January 1991.
	Boiler Technician	BT	Merged into Machinist's Mate on 1 October 1996.
	Cryptologic Technician (Communications) Cryptologic Technician (Administration) Cryptologic Technician (Networking)	CTO CTA; CTN	Merged into Information Systems Technician on 1 March 2006. Merged into Yeoman on 1 October 2007. Changed to Cyber Warfare Technician on 29 June 2023.
	Disbursing Clerk	DK	Merged into Personnel Specialist on 1 October 2005.
	Draftsman/Illustrator-Draftsman	DM	Merged into Mass Communication Specialist on 1 July 2006.
	Data Processing Technician	DP	Merged into Radioman on October 1, 1998.
	Data Systems Technician	DS	Merged into Electronics technician and Fire controlman on 1 October 1998.
	Dental Technician	DT	Merged into Hospital corpsman on 30 August 2005.
	Electronic Warfare Technician	EW	Merged into Cryptologic Technician on 1 October 2003.
	Gunner's Mate Technician	GMT	Started in 1962 and changed to Weapons Technician in 1986.
	Instrumentman	IM	Started in 1961 and disestablished in 1999.
	Journalist	JO	Merged into Mass Communication Specialist on 1 July 2006.
	Lithographer	LI	Merged into Mass Communication Specialist on 1 July 2006.
	Mess Management Specialist	MS	Changed to Culinary specialist on 15 January 2004.
	Molder	ML	Disestablished in 1997
	Nuclear Weaponsman	NW	Changed to Gunner's Mate Technician in 1962.
	Ocean Systems Technician	OT	Merged into Sonar Technician on 1 October 1998.
	Opticalman	OM	Started in 1948 and disestablished in 2004.
	Postal Clerk	PC	Merged into Logistics Specialist on 1 October 2009, effective on 1 January 2010.
	Photographers Mate	PH	Merged into Mass Communication Specialist on 1 July 2006.
	Patternmaker	PM	Disestablished in 1997
	Personnelman	PN	Merged into Personnel Specialist on 1 October 2005.
	Radarman	RD	Merged into Operations Specialist in 1972.
	Radioman	RM	Submarine: Merged into Electronics technician in 1997. Surface: Merged into Information Systems Technician in November 1999.
	Storekeeper	SK	Merged into Logistics Specialist on 1 October 2009, effective on 1 January 2010. Active in the U.S. Coast Guard.
	Signalman	SM	Disestablished on 30 September 2004 and duties absorbed by Quartermaster rating.
	Weapons Technician	WT	Started in 1986 and disestablished in 1995.

== See also ==
- Air Force Specialty Code
- Badges of the United States Navy
- List of Naval Officer Designators
- List of United States Army careers
- List of United States Coast Guard ratings
- List of United States Marine Corps MOS
- List of United States Navy enlisted warfare designations
- List of United States Navy staff corps (insignia)
- Navy Enlisted Classification
- Obsolete badges of the United States military
- Uniforms of the United States Navy
- United States Navy enlisted rate insignia
- United States Navy officer rank insignia
