= Photographers Mate =

United States Navy occupational rating

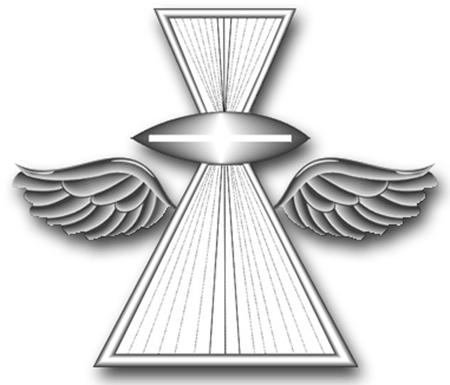
- Rating insignia
- Issued by: United States Navy
- Type: Enlisted rating
- Abbreviation: PH
- Specialty: Aviation / Public affairs

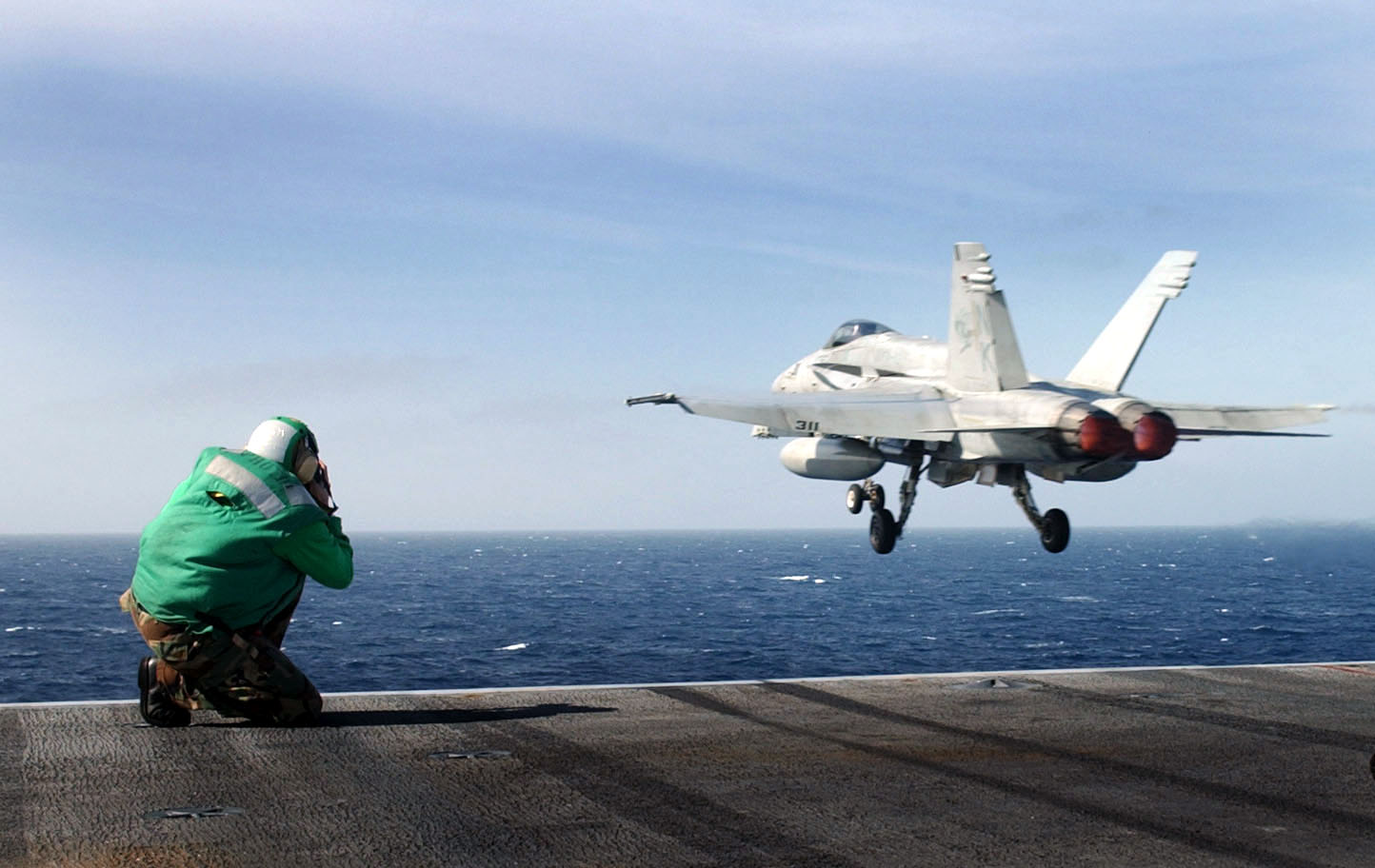
A Photographer's Mate photographs the launch of an F/A-18C Hornet on the flight deck of USS John C. Stennis

Photographers mate (or PH) was a rating in the United States Navy's aviation and public affairs community. It was merged into the Mass Communication Specialist rating on 1 July 2006.

== History ==
The father of naval photography, Walter Leroy "Dick" Richardson, enlisted as a ship's cook on 1 November 1911. In 1914, he transferred to Naval Air Station Pensacola, where his hobby of photography earned him the designation of Official Station Photographer. Richardson reenlisted as an Aviation machinist's mate in 1915 and, after attending the Army school of aerial photography at Langley Air Force Base, organized the Navy's photographic section of Bureau of Navigation. In 1918, Richardson was commissioned as an officer of the Naval Reserve Flying Corps at the first Navy photo school at NAS Miami, Florida. When World War I ended Lieutenant (junior grade) Richardson and a few enlisted personnel opened a school at Anacostia training navy photographers for still photography, aerial photography, motion picture photography, developing and printing. The school moved to NAS Pensacola in 1923, and the first navy photographic training textbook was published in 1927.

As World War II unfolded in Europe, a Navy officer was sent to England to observe and adopt British photo interpretation methods. He returned to set up the Navy's first photographic interpretation school. As the war expanded, Navy photographers were trained by Movietone News, Kodak, and Fairchild Camera and Instrument company. Many civilian photographers fulfilled their military obligation by serving in combat photography units (CPUs). The war saw 1,500 naval officers and 5,300 enlisted men trained at the Navy photography school. The Navy Photographic Science Laboratory established in Washington, D.C. in 1943, was later renamed the Naval Photographic Center.

In 1948, the photographer's mate abbreviation changed from PHOM to PH, and the symbol of the camera on the rating badge was replaced by divergent light rays passing through a lens. As jet aircraft appeared, the old 9 in (230 mm) film width was replaced by 70 mm (2.8 in) and then 5 in (130 mm) film in larger cameras. The RF-8 Crusader was replaced by the RA-5 Vigilante aboard Forrestal-class super carriers equipped with a chute from the flight deck to a photo darkroom so film packages detached from the aircraft upon landing could be fed into developing machines to be available for debriefing when the pilot reached his ready room. In the early 1980's the RF-8's of VFP-63 were being phased out, replaced by the Tactical Aerial Reconnaissance Pod System (TARPS) flying on F-14A Tomcat aircraft. Navy Photographer's Mates were responsible for maintaining the three cameras in the Pod and also uploading and downloading film before and after each mission, returning the exposed film to the carrier's intelligence center (CVIC) for processing and analysis. Fighter Squadron 32 (VF-32) was the first Tomcat squadron to take TARPS into combat during the Grenada campaign in October of 1983. VF-32 then extensively used TARPS in combat conditions a few weeks later off the coast of Lebanon during that conflict. Navy photographers were sent to the University of Southern California to study motion picture production techniques, to Syracuse University for photojournalism training and to the Rochester Institute of Technology to learn photographic quality control. Other photographers were sent to NAS Key West to learn quality control on processor maintenance.at the Naval Intelligence Processing Training Facility (NIPSTRAFAC).
