= Machinery Technician =

Enlisted rating in the United States Coast Guard

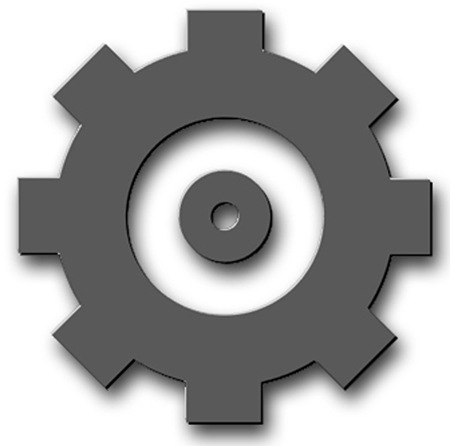
- Rating insignia
- Issued by: United States Coast Guard
- Type: Enlisted rating
- Abbreviation: MK
- Specialty: Engineering

Machinery Technician (MK) is an enlisted rating in the United States Coast Guard that is responsible for the operation, maintenance and repair of a cutter's propulsion, auxiliary equipment and outside equipment, internal combustion engines (gasoline, diesel, gas turbines), environmental support systems (heating, ventilation, air conditioning), hydraulics, generator sets, and areas of hazardous material recovery and control. They are also responsible for the engineering maintenance of any small boats assigned to their command. At smaller stations and cutters they also serve as electricians.

Senior MK's are assigned supervisory positions as shop supervisors at shore installations. On smaller cutters and at small boat stations senior MK's are assigned as engineer petty officers and are responsible for the overall management of the unit engineering department including its personnel.

The rating of machinery technician includes the obsolete Coast Guard ratings of engineman (EN), machinist mate (MM), Machinery repairman (MR), and Boiler technician (BT). Because it combines several older obsolete ratings, it is one of the largest ratings in the Coast Guard. The MK "A" school is 13 weeks in length and is located at the Coast Guard Training Center Yorktown in Yorktown, Virginia.

== Notable people ==
- Charles W. Sexton, Machinery Technician First Class, USCG, was awarded a posthumous award of the Coast Guard Medal for "extraordinary heroism."
- Robert J. Yered, Engineman First Class, USCG, exposed himself to enemy gunfire as he helped extinguish fires on a burning barge during the Vietnam War.

== See also ==
- List of United States Coast Guard ratings
