= Logistics specialist =

US Navy enlisted rating

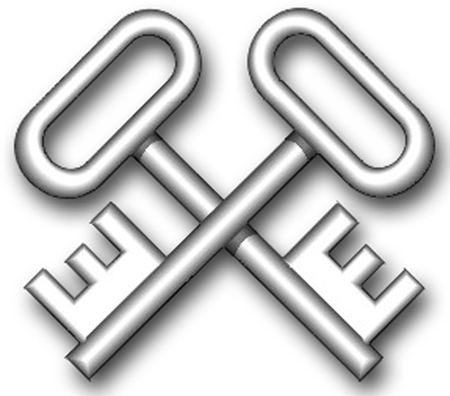
U.S. Navy's "LS" rating device

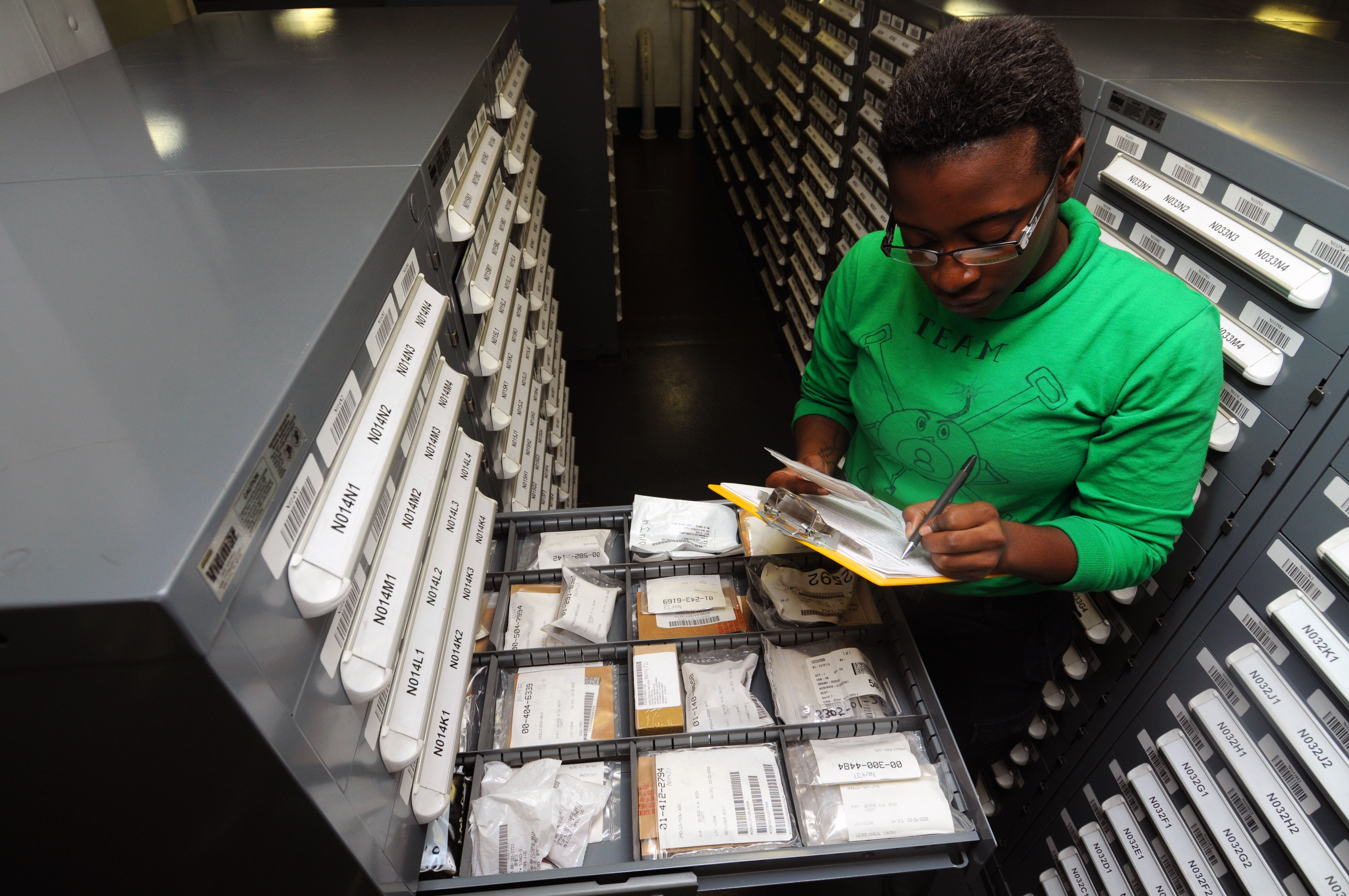
A logistics specialist inventories supplies in a storeroom aboard the aircraft carrier USS George H. W. Bush.

The logistics specialist (LS) is a US Navy enlisted rating that was created on 1 October, 2009 by the merger of the storekeeper (SK) and postal clerk (PC) ratings. It also included the previous functions of the former aviation storekeeper (AK) rating, which was previously merged into the former storekeeper (SK) rating on 1 January 2003.

== History ==
The original storekeeper rating was substantiated in 1916 and the conversion to logistics specialist was not simply a name change, as this evolution encompassed federal laws and punitive regulations of handling, sorting, and securing the mail.

== Job description ==
Logistics specialists are primarily tasked with maintaining military supply stores. Their responsibilities generally include open purchasing and procurement, shipping and receiving, inventory management, and issue of equipment, repair parts, tools, consumable items (paper, pens, toilet paper, batteries, etc.), hazardous materials or anything else obtained through the naval supply system combined with former postal clerk duties as custodian of postal effects and monitoring designated mail orderlies.

Logistics specialists manage inventories and issuance of repair parts (aircraft and ships) and of general supplies and specialized supplies (e.g., personal flight gear for naval aircrews or specialized combat equipment for Navy SEALs or Naval Mobile Construction Battalion "Seabees"), as well as distribute mail for naval ships, submarines, aviation squadrons, and shore-based activities.

They open-purchase, inventory, screen, procure, receive, store and issue material and replace repair selected components. They utilize financial accounting and database systems to perform inventory and financial management functions. Additionally, they sort and distribute all official and personal mail, manage money order and stamp inventories, and maintain financial and inventory reports.

== Function ==
Logistics specialists typically fall under the command or supervision of commissioned officers of the U.S. Navy Supply Corps. The exception to this is in the case of those sailors in the logistics specialist rating who hold the Navy Enlisted Classification (NEC) of independent storekeeper, which trains logistics specialist 1st class petty officers (E-6) and above to operate independently of a supply officer. Of the supply department, on small ships, they will be found in S-1 division. On larger ships, they would be found in S-1 (stock control and financials), S-6 (aviation material support), S-8 (general stores and supplies), S-9 (hazardous materials), and varying divisions for the post office (sometimes S-10 or other number). Logistics Learning Alliance provide a range of logistics courses to enhance your knowledge.

Logistics specialists can be found serving virtually any naval platform, in diverse theaters, including combat zones on forward operating bases like Iraq or Afghanistan in place of supply soldiers for the Army as an ad hoc individual augmentee. For this reason, they can be found with virtually every warfare pin qualification offered by the Navy with only a few exceptions. Of the warfare qualifications commonly held, included are: aviation warfare, surface warfare, Seabee combat warfare, expeditionary warfare, and submarine warfare (or "dolphins").

Logistics specialists also provide major support to the North Atlantic Alliance, Spanish Navy, US Coast Guard ships and the Military Sealift Command with their Fleet Logistics Center Sigonella–Site in Rota, Spain for ships and aircraft supplies (including fuel) as their first stop east bound to the Mediterranean from the Atlantic region including all military mail going to US military personnel in and around European nations.

== Training ==
Logistic specialists are primarily trained at Naval Technical Training Center in Meridian, Mississippi. Undesignated or non-rated sailors may also 'strike' (moonlight train/study through on-the-job-training and online-courses and take the exam) for logistics specialists without attending NTTC Meridian's Storekeeper "A" School. The Coast Guard retains the name and rate of Storekeeper, and has not adopted the name Logistics Specialist. Coast Guard Storekeepers are trained in Petaluma, California.

== See also ==
- List of United States Navy ratings
- Ship's Serviceman
