= SO1 =

SO1 may refer to:

- Specialist Protection Command a command division within the Specialist Operations Directorate of London's Metropolitan Police Service
- Special Operator: Naval Special Warfare, SEAL; see United States Navy SEALs#Special warfare ratings
- Sonarman First Class, a former American naval rank.
- A staff officer of the first class, usually an officer of commander, lieutenant colonel or wing commander rank.
- Special Operations 1 - Propaganda, of SOE (Special Operations Executive, British, World War II)
