= Aviation structural mechanic =

Aviation Structural Mechanic
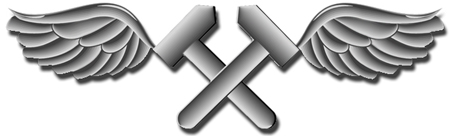
- Rating insignia
- Issued by: United States Navy
- Type: Enlisted rating
- Abbreviation: AM
- Specialty: Aviation

Aviation structural mechanic (abbreviated as AM) is a United States Navy occupational rating.

== Duties ==
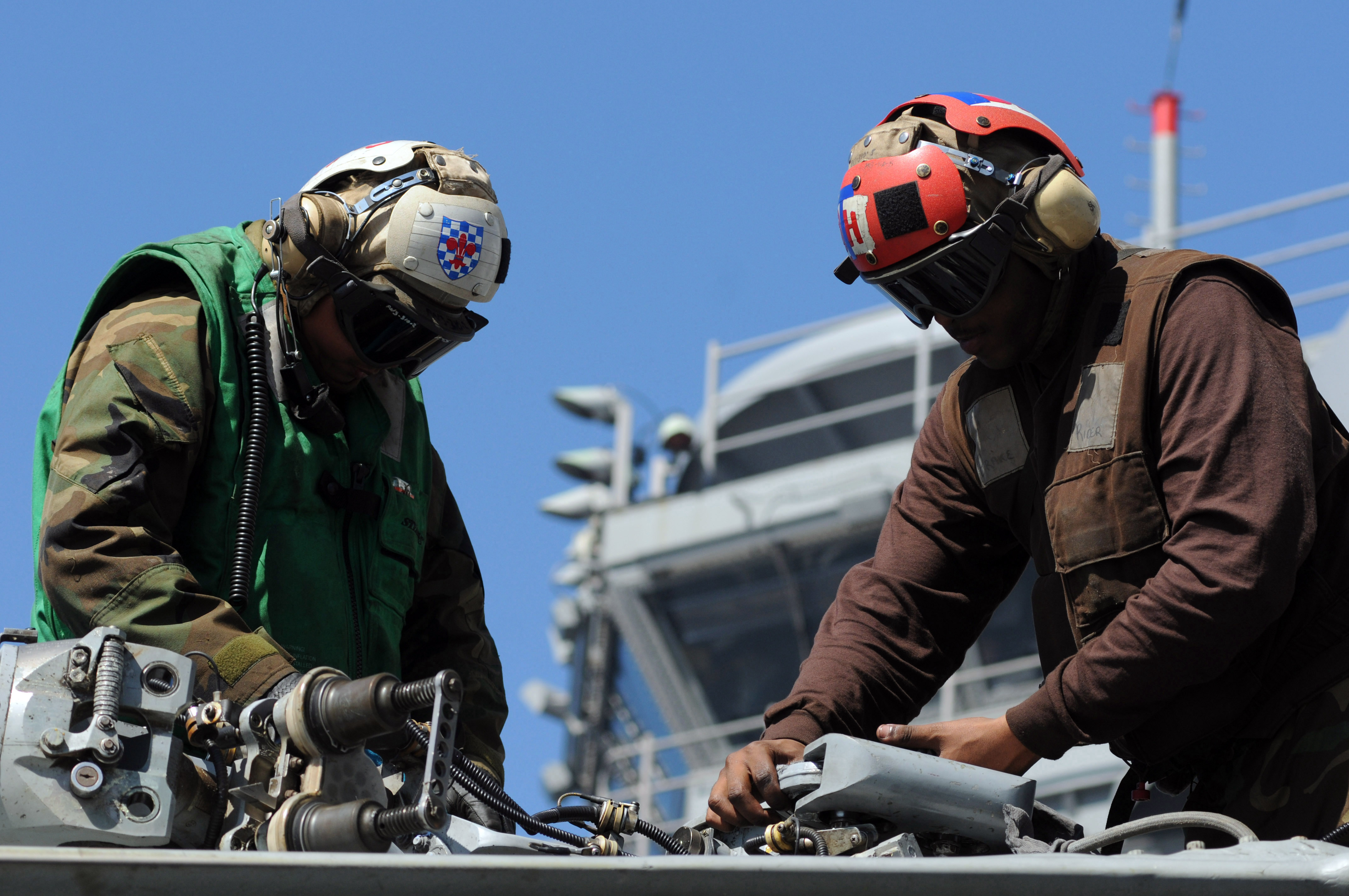
Aviation structural mechanics perform routine maintenance on an MH-60S Sea Hawk helicopter

Aviation Structural Mechanics maintain aircraft airframe and structural components including flight surfaces and controls, hydraulic and pneumatic control and actuating systems and mechanisms, landing gear systems, air conditioning, pressurization, visual improvement, oxygen and other utility systems, egress systems including seat and canopy ejection systems and components. They fabricate and repair metallic and nonmetallic materials; perform aircraft daily, special, hourly, and conditional inspections, supervise operation of airframe work centers; maintain aircraft metallic and non-metallic structures including fuselages, fixed and moveable flight surfaces, tail booms, doors, panels, decks, empennages, and seats (except ejection seats); flight controls and related mechanisms; hydraulic power storage and distribution systems including main (primary and secondary), auxiliary (utility), and emergency systems; hydraulic actuating subsystems; landing gear systems including wheels and tires, brakes, and emergency systems; pneumatic power, storage and distribution systems; hoists and winches, wing and tail fold systems; launch and arresting gear systems; hydraulic component repair and test.

Aviation Structural Mechanics, Safety Equipment (AME) maintain safety belts, shoulder harnesses and integrated flight harnesses in aircraft, inertia reels, seat and canopy ejection systems, gaseous and liquid oxygen systems, life raft ejection systems, fire extinguishing systems excluding fire detection systems, portable fire extinguishers, emergency egress systems, air-conditioning, heating cabin and cockpit pressurization, ventilating and anti-G-systems, visual improvement systems, other utility systems and associated lines, fittings, rigging, valves and control mechanisms; replenish liquid and gaseous oxygen systems; remove and install oxygen system valves, gauges, converters and regulators; inspect, remove, install and rig ejection seats, shoulder harnesses, lap belts and face curtain mechanisms; inspect, remove, install and adjust firing mechanisms and cartridges for ejection seats, lap belts and canopies; operate and maintain liquid nitrogen and liquid and gaseous oxygen shop transfer and recharge equipment; perform daily, pre-flight, post-flight and other periodic aircraft inspections.

Since 2001, the Occupational Rating has been divided into two Service Ratings for E3-E7:

- AM - Aviation Structural Mechanic
- AME - Aviation Structural Mechanic (Safety Equipment)

At the E-8 level, AM and AME Personnel may be advanced to AMCS (Senior Chief Aviation Structural Mechanic). At the E-9 level, AMCS and ADCS (Senior Chief Aviation Machinist's Mate) Personnel look towards advancement to AFCM (Master Chief Aviation Maintenanceman).

== Working Environment ==
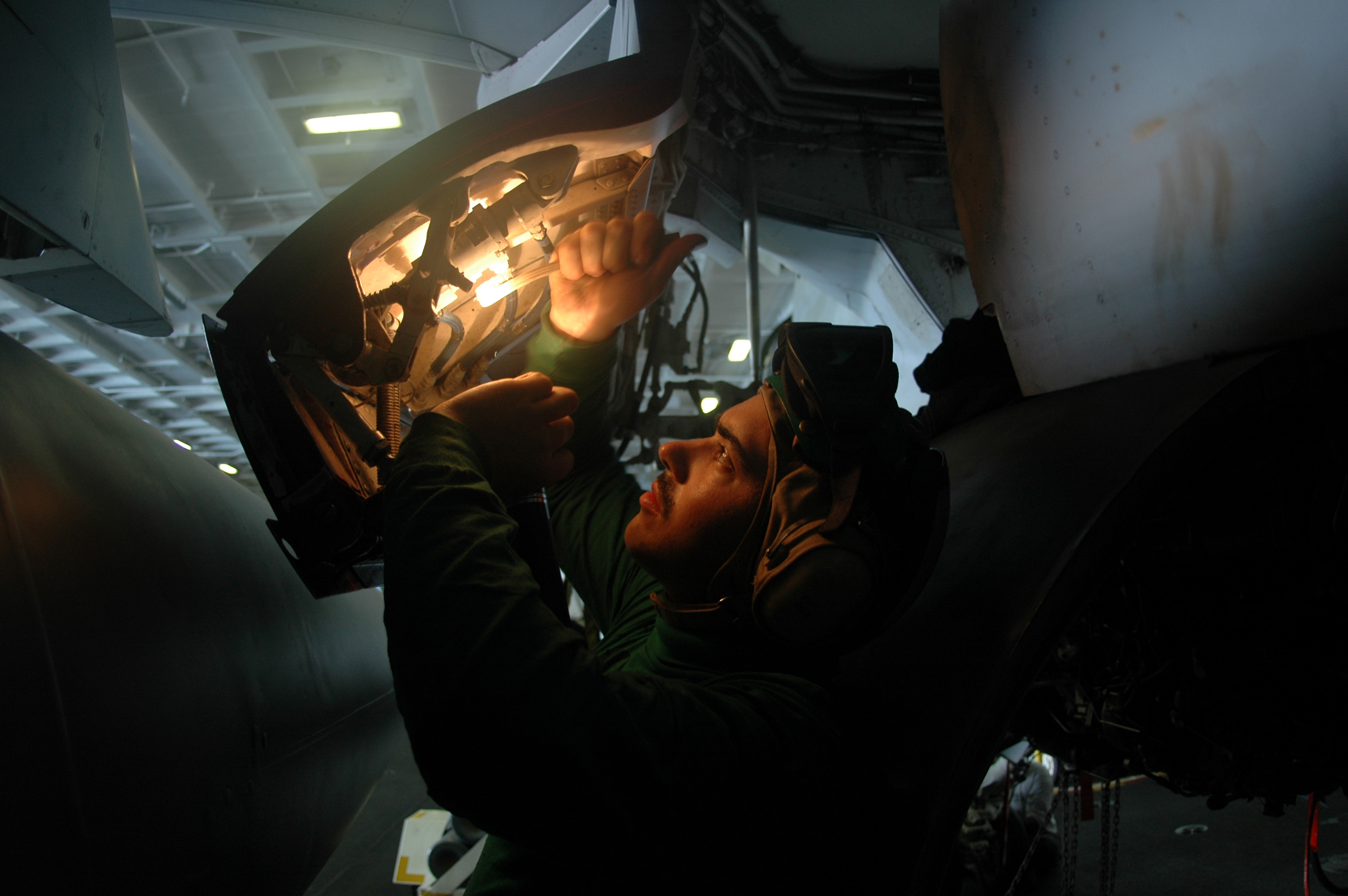
Aviation structural mechanic performing maintenance on an EA-6B Prowler

Aviation Structural Mechanics may be assigned to sea or Shore Duty in any place in the world, so their working environment varies considerably. They may work in hangars or hangar decks, or outside on flight decks or flight lines at Air Stations. A high noise level is a normal part of their work environment. AMs work closely with others, do mostly physical work and require little supervision. AMs may also serve as flight engineers aboard certain aircraft.

== Requirements ==
ASVAB score requirement: VE+AR+MK+AS = 210 OR VE+AR+MK+MC = 210

Security clearance requirement: None (except for those who volunteer for aircrew duty)

Other requirements:

- Vision must be correctable to 20/20
- Must have normal color perception
- Must have normal hearing
- No history of drug use.

== History ==
Between 1948 and 2001, the AM Rating consisted of two additional Service Ratings:

- AM - Aviation Structural Mechanic
- AME - Aviation Structural Mechanic (Safety Equipment)
- AMH - Aviation Structural Mechanic (Hydraulics)
- AMS - Aviation Structural Mechanic (Structures)

AMEs maintain and repair oxygen, cockpit and cabin pressurization, and ejection seat systems. The AMH was for hydraulic systems (landing gear, brakes, flight controls and all related). The AMS was structural/sheet metal. Today's AM Rating began from the aviation metalsmith used between 1921 and 1948. In 2001, the AMS and AMH Ratings were merged to form the AM Rating, the AME Rating remains a separate and distinct rating.

== See also ==
Media related to Aviation Structural Mechanic at Wikimedia Commons

- List of United States Navy ratings
