= Aerographer's mate =

United States Navy occupational rating

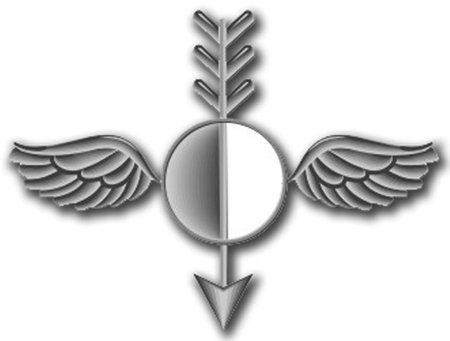
- Rating Badge
- Issued by: United States Navy
- Type: Enlisted rating
- Abbreviation: AG
- Specialty: Aviation

Aerographer's mate (abbreviated as AG) is a United States Navy occupational rating, devoted to collection and analysis of data related to weather, radar, and ocean conditions.

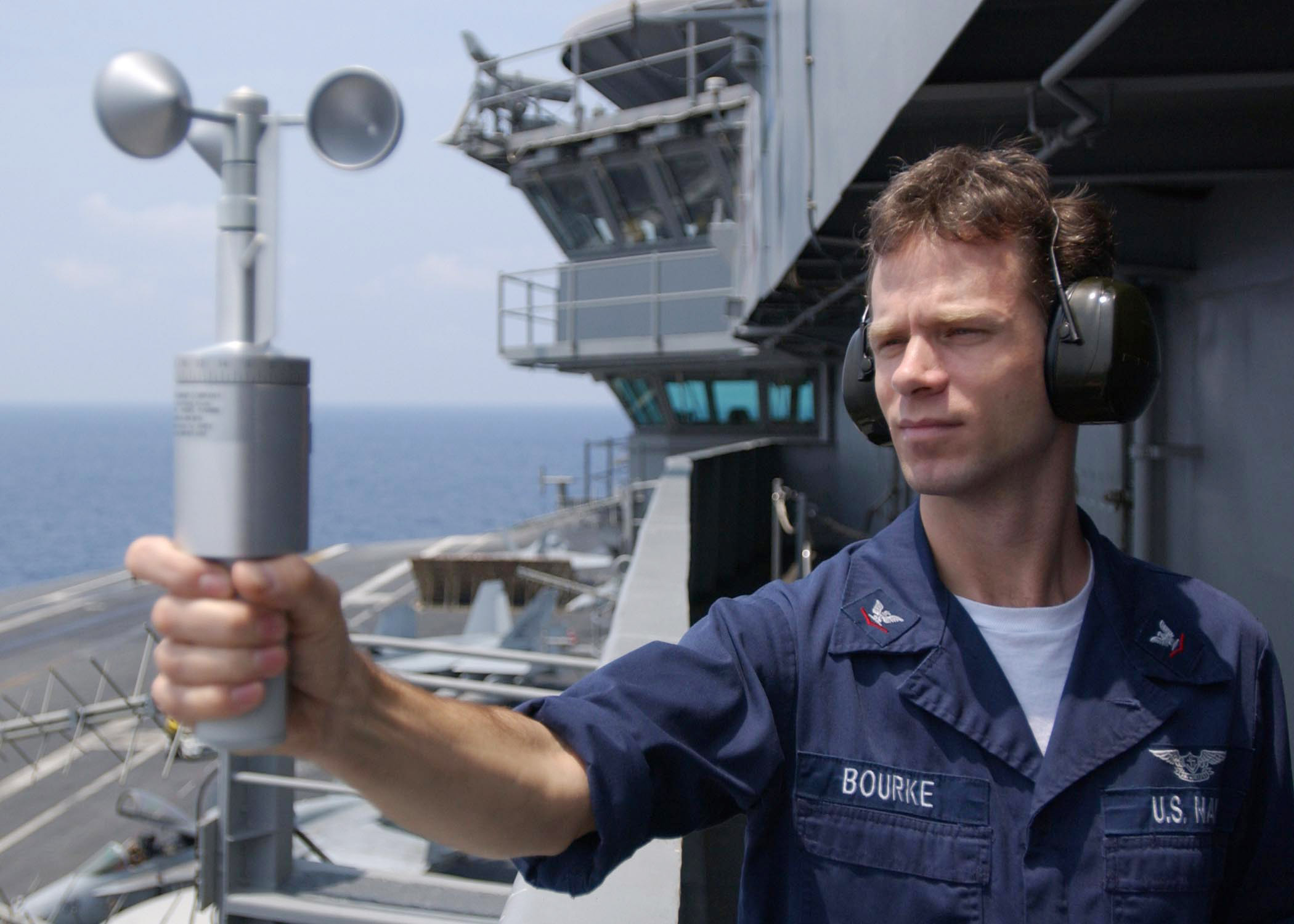
An aerographer's mate 3rd class uses a handheld anemometer to measure wind speed and direction aboard the aircraft carrier USS Dwight D. Eisenhower.

== Duties ==
Aerographer's mates:

- observe, collect, record and analyze meteorological and oceanographic data;
- make visual and instrument observations of weather and sea conditions, surface and sub-surface;
- operate meteorological satellite receivers and interpret and apply satellite data;
- interpret and brief radar imagery and data;
- interpret meteorological and oceanographic codes;
- verify meteorological and oceanographic products;
- evaluate recent meteorological and oceanographic developments for integration into local routines and enter data on appropriate charts;
- operate ancillary equipment for the processing, dissemination and display of environmental data;
- perform preventive maintenance on meteorological and oceanographic equipment;
- prepare warnings of severe and hazardous weather and sea conditions;
- forecast meteorological and oceanographic conditions;
- prepare and present briefings concerning current and predicted environmental conditions and their effect on operations.

== Training ==
AG "A" and "C" Schools are currently located in Biloxi, Mississippi, on Keesler Air Force Base. AG "A" School concentrates on weather observing and lasts approximately 3 months. AG "C" concentrates on weather forecasting and lasts approximately 9 months. Upon graduating from "A" school, AGs work toward qualification as environmental observers through completion of personnel qualification standards and job qualification requirements. They also prepare for advanced training at "C" school by the four- to six-year career stage.

Aerographer's mates are assigned to larger ships such as aircraft carriers, amphibious ships and cruisers, and also to naval air stations, weather centers and other shore facilities in the United States or overseas. During a 20-year period in the Navy, AGs spend about 60% of their time assigned to shore units and 40% to fleet stations.

== See also ==
- List of United States Navy ratings
- Weather observer
