= Mineman =

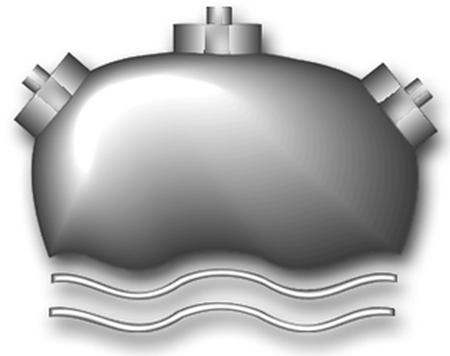
- Rating insignia
- Issued by: United States Navy
- Type: Enlisted rating
- Abbreviation: MMC
- Specialty: Weapons

Mineman (abbreviated as MN) is a United States Navy occupational rating.

== Duties ==
- Perform organizational and intermediate level maintenance on underwater mines and associated equipment, guns, gun mounts, handling equipment, small arms, surface sonar and mine countermeasures equipment.
- Assemble, test, stow, and transport underwater mines.
- Operate, maintain, and perform authorized modifications on material handling equipment, assembly‑level items, and test equipment.
- Perform safety criteria testing on material handling equipment.
- Participate in fleet mining and exercise training programs.
- Train, direct, and supervise personnel in ship's maintenance duties in all activities relating to marlinespike, deck, boat seamanship, painting, maintenance, upkeep of ship's external structure, rigging, deck equipment, and boats.
- Perform seamanship tasks; test and inspect gun ammunition.
- Inspect and repair magazine sprinkler systems.
- Supervise personnel in handling and stowage of gun ammunition.
- Direct crews in operation of guns, gun mounts, ammunition hoists, and handling rooms.
- Function as Plotters and Radiotelephone talkers.
- Maintain Combat Information Center (CIC) displays of strategic and tactical information.
- Operate surveillance radar, Identification Friend or Foe (IFF) Systems, and associated equipment
- Interpret radar presentations, evaluate tactical situations, and make recommendations to superiors during watch conditions.
- Apply current doctrine and procedures to CIC operations as necessary for radar navigation.
- Provide technical information and assistance related to Mine Warfare and search and rescue operations.
- Provide technical information and advice on capabilities, limitations, reliability, and operational readiness.
- Advise staffs and commands on matters of operations and personnel.
- Operate (manipulate, control, evaluate, and interpret data) surface sonar and other oceanographic systems.

== Requirements ==
ASVAB Score Requirement: VE + AR + MK + MC = 210 or VE + AR + MK + AS = 210

Security Clearance Requirement: Secret

Must have normal color perception and be a U.S. citizen

== See also ==
- List of United States Navy ratings
