= Aviation support equipment technician =

Aviation Support Equipment Technician
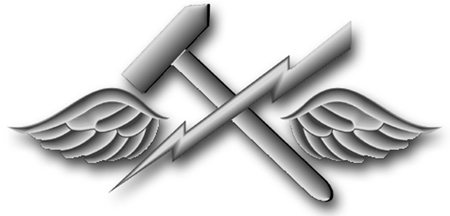
- Rating insignia
- Issued by: United States Navy
- Type: Enlisted rating
- Abbreviation: AS
- Specialty: Aviation

Aviation Support Equipment Technician (abbreviated as AS) is a United States Navy occupational rating. The United States Marine Corps currently maintains 3 separate aviation support equipment military occupational specialties. They are: 6071 (basic technician, not "C" School qualified), 6072 aircraft maintenance support equipment hydraulic/ pneumatic structures mechanic and 6073 aircraft maintenance support equipment electrician / refrigeration mechanic.

== Duties ==
Aviation support equipment technicians perform preventive and corrective maintenance on aviation support equipment, aviation mobile firefighting units, material handling equipment, hoisting and lifting devices, and associated components and systems; service, inspect, test, troubleshoot, and repair gasoline and diesel engine systems, transmission systems, hydraulic, hydrostatic, and pneumatic systems, steering and suspension systems, cryogenic systems, electrical systems, gas turbine compressor units, electrical and hydraulic power generating equipment, air-conditioning and refrigeration systems (excluding avionics support equipment); manage support equipment assets at different command levels; and provide training in operation and maintenance of aviation support equipment.

== See also ==
Media related to Aviation Support Equipment Technician (United States Navy) at Wikimedia Commons

- List of United States Navy ratings
