= Utilitiesman (United States Navy) =

Seabee occupational rating in the U.S. Navy

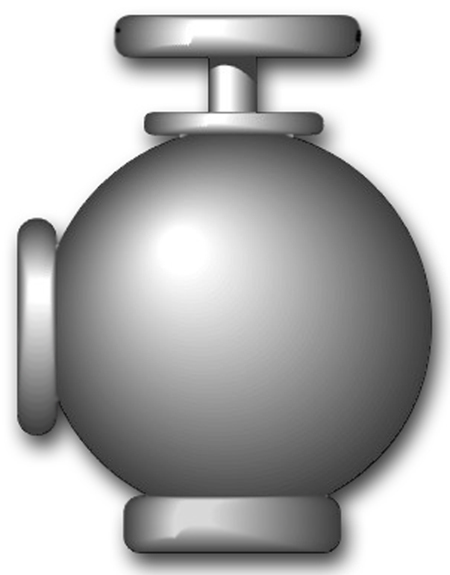
- Rating insignia
- Issued by: United States Navy
- Type: Enlisted rating
- Abbreviation: UT
- Specialty: Construction

Utilitiesman (abbreviated as UT) is a United States Navy occupational rating in the United States Naval Construction Forces (Seabees).

Utilitiesmen plan, supervise and perform tasks involved in installation, maintenance and repair of plumbing, heating, steam, compressed air, fuel storage and distribution systems, water treatment and distribution systems, air conditioning and refrigeration equipment, systems, as prescribed by drawings and specifications; schedule and evaluate installation and operational tasks; prepare records and reports; maintain individual combat readiness; and perform tasks required in combat and disaster preparedness or recovery operations.

At the master chief petty officer level, they merge with all other construction ratings as a master chief seabee (abbreviated as CBCM).

== See also ==
- List of United States Navy ratings
