= Aviation maintenance administrationman =

Aviation Maintenance Administrationman
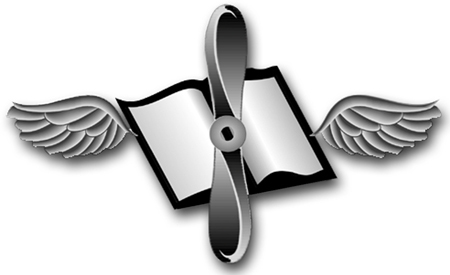
- Rating insignia
- Issued by: United States Navy
- Type: Enlisted rating
- Abbreviation: AZ
- Specialty: Aviation

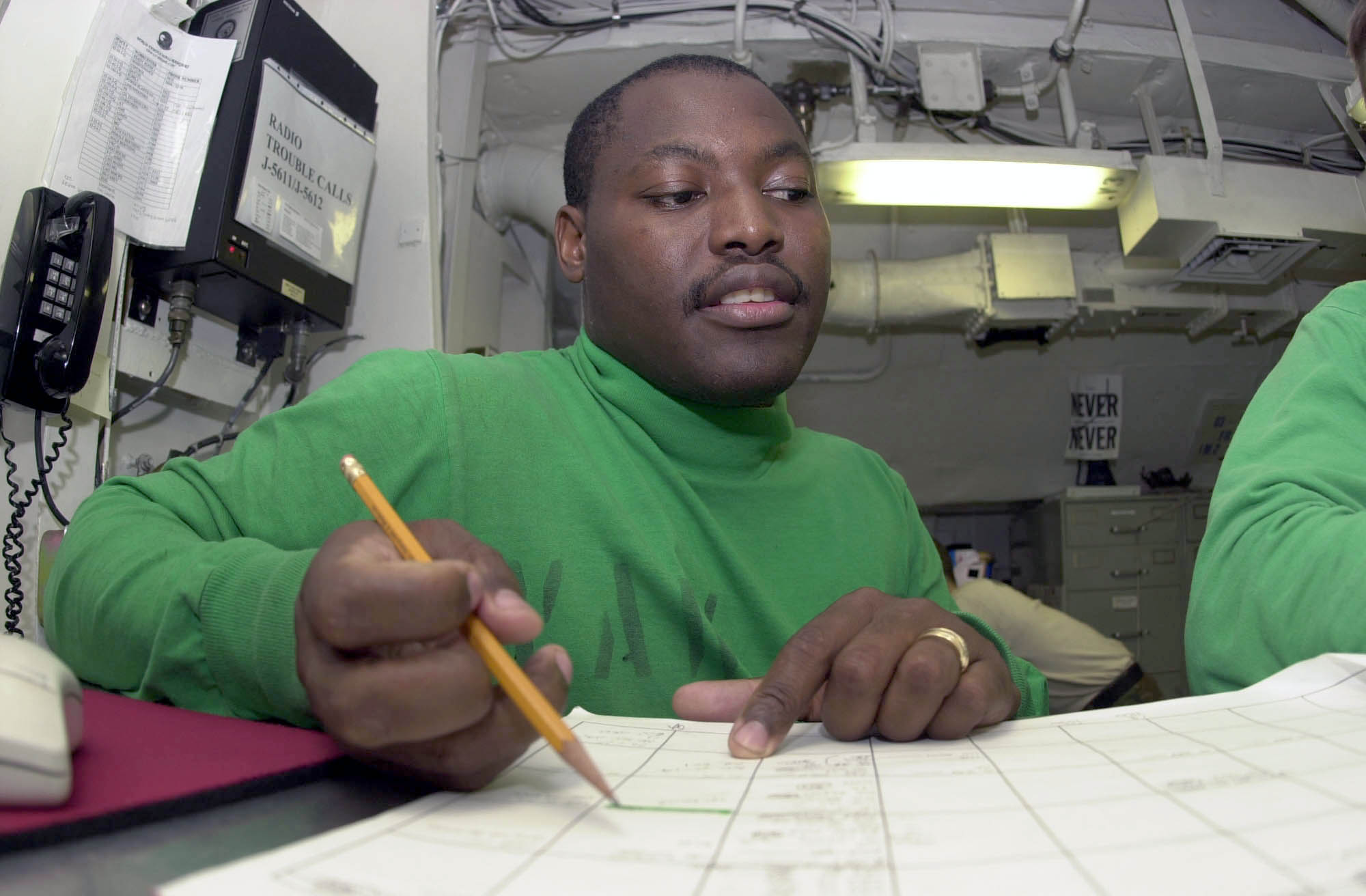
An aviation maintenance administrationman reviewing the evening flight plan aboard the USS Nimitz

Aviation Maintenance Administrationman (AZ) is a United States Navy occupational rating.

== Duties ==
An Aviation Maintenance Administrationman performs technical, managerial, and support duties required by the Naval Aviation Maintenance Program (NAMP). These can include:

- Preparing aircraft and maintenance-related correspondence
- Maintaining directive control
- Maintaining custody records, control forms, and reporting requirements
- Maintaining files on departmental organization, manning, personnel temporary additional duty (TAD), transfers, and training requirements
- Planning, programming, and coordinating scheduled/unscheduled maintenance tasks
- Incorporating changes and modifications to aircraft, aeronautical equipment, and support equipment
- Coordinating squadron/activity maintenance, reporting requirements, and recommending changes to maintain policies and procedures
- Organizing, maintaining, and operating the Navy Aeronautical Technical Publications Library (TPL)
  - Overseeing dispersed libraries, auditing, and training dispersed librarians
- Operating the Naval Aviation Logistics Command Management Information System (NALCOMIS)
- Inputting, verifying, and validating data related to naval aircraft, including history, operation, maintenance, and equipment.
- Maintaining operations department flight data, historical files, and aviator data.
- Providing support/assistance to organizational, intermediate, and depot maintenance staff areas
- Performing other ad hoc duties concerning organizational, intermediate, and depot maintenance activities or aviation staff commands.

== See also ==
- List of United States Navy ratings
