= Missile technician (United States Navy) =

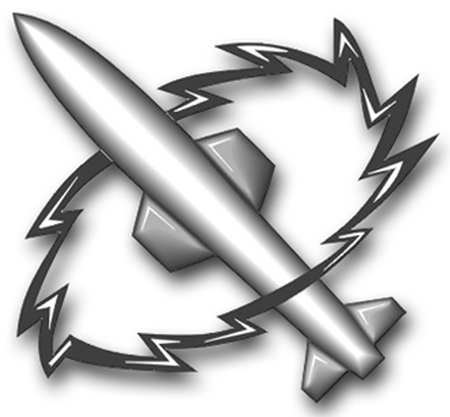
- Rating insignia
- Issued by: United States Navy
- Type: Enlisted rating
- Abbreviation: MT
- Specialty: Weapons

Missile technician (abbreviated as MT) is a United States Navy occupational rating.

MTs operate, test, maintain, troubleshoot, repair and maintain security for ballistic missile weapons systems. They align, calibrate, troubleshoot and repair all areas of the missile system, launcher system, and various test systems; troubleshoot and repair digital, electrical, and electronic systems; troubleshoot and repair cooling and heating systems as well as control systems using electromechanical devices, hydraulics, and pneumatics; use standard electronic test equipment such as meters, logic probes, and logic analyzers; use Windows-based computers for word processing as well as other administrative record keeping tasks.

== See also ==
- List of United States Navy ratings
