= Construction electrician (United States Navy) =

United States Navy occupational rating

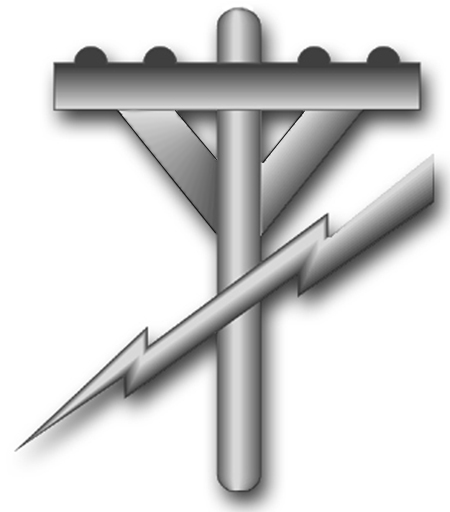
- Rating insignia
- Issued by: United States Navy
- Type: Enlisted rating
- Abbreviation: CE
- Specialty: Construction

Construction electrician (abbreviated as CE) is a United States Navy occupational rating.

Construction electricians install and repair wiring; overhead and underground primary and secondary distribution systems; setup, operate and service electrical equipment; climb poles and towers utilizing lineman's equipment; attach and service electrical equipment, (i.e. transformers, switching equipment, motors, motor controllers, controls and electrical system) perform tasks required in combat and disaster preparedness or recovery operations.

At the master chief petty officer level, they merge with all other construction ratings as a master chief seabee (abbreviated as CBCM).

== See also ==
- List of United States Navy ratings
