= Postal clerk (United States Navy) =

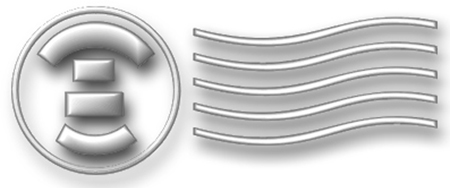
- Rating insignia
- Issued by: United States Navy
- Type: Enlisted rating
- Abbreviation: PC
- Specialty: Administration/Supply

Postal clerk (abbreviated as PC) was a United States Navy occupational rating.

Postal clerks:

- Operate US Navy post offices
- Supervise, organize and establish or disestablish a US Navy post office
- Perform postal counter work, including sale of stamps and money orders
- Process incoming and outgoing mail
- Route mail
- Maintain a mail directory
- Process official mail
- Maintain security of postal effects and mail matter
- Process claims and inquiries
- Prepare and file postal correspondence, records and reports

== Rating merger ==
Effective 1 October 2009, the ratings of storekeeper (SK) and postal clerk (PC) have merged to become logistics specialist (LS).

== See also ==
- List of United States Navy ratings
