= Personnel specialist =

Personnel Specialist
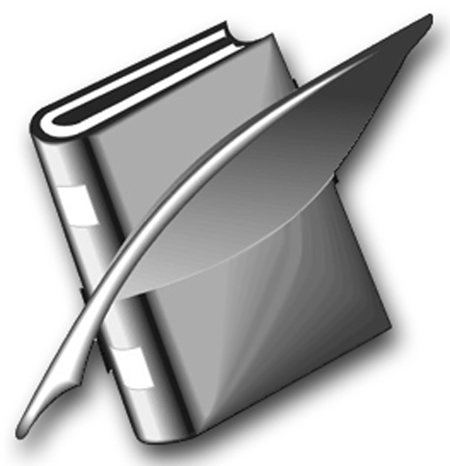
- Rating insignia
- Issued by: United States Navy
- Type: Enlisted rating
- Abbreviation: PS
- Specialty: Administration

Personnel Specialist (abbreviated as PS) is a United States Navy occupational rating.

== Roles ==
Personnel Specialists:

- Were established as a merger of Personnelman (PN) and Disbursing Clerk (DK) ratings on October 1, 2005
- Perform clerical and administration duties involved in maintaining personnel records, preparing reports and accomplishing accounting procedures
- Counsel enlisted personnel concerning Navy ratings, training, advancement, awards, educational opportunities, and the rights, benefits and advantages of a Navy career
- Utilize and maintain current publications and directives pertaining to personnel administration and operate associated ADP equipment

== See also ==
- List of United States Navy ratings
