= Machinery repairman =

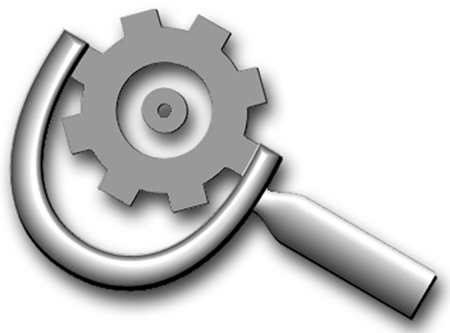
- Rating insignia
- Issued by: United States Navy
- Type: Enlisted rating
- Abbreviation: MR
- Specialty: Engineering

Machinery repairman (abbreviated as MR) is a United States Navy occupational rating. The Shop Machinist and the Outside Machinist ratings of the Machinist's Mate rating were combined to create the Machinery Repairman rating in 1948.

Machinery repairmen perform organizational and intermediate maintenance on assigned equipment and in support of other ships, requiring the skillful use of lathes, milling machines, boring mills, grinders, power hack saws, drill presses, and other machine tools; portable machinery; hand tools; and measuring instruments found in a machine shop.

Machinery repairmen are skilled machine tool operators. They make replacement parts for a ship's engine auxiliary equipment, such as evaporators, air compressors and pumps. The repair of deck equipment, including winches and hoists, condensers and heat exchange devices are completed by machinist mates. Machinery repairmen assist enginemen by repairing or producing parts in the machine shop. Shipboard machinery repairmen do not frequently operate main propulsion machinery, primarily performing machine shop duties.

== See also ==
- List of United States Navy ratings
