= Equipment operator =

Occupational description in the U.S. Navy

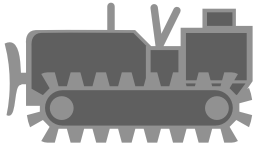
- Rating insignia
- Issued by: United States Navy
- Type: Enlisted rating
- Abbreviation: EO
- Specialty: Construction

Equipment operator (abbreviated as EO) is a United States Navy occupational rating.

Equipment operators perform tasks involving deployment and operation of automotive, materials handling, weight lifting and construction equipment; direct and coordinate efforts of individuals and crews in execution of construction, earth‑moving, roadbuilding, quarrying, asphalt batching and paving, concrete batch plant operations, concrete paving and transit mixer operation assignments; maintain records and reports on mobile and stationary equipment and organize and supervise automotive and construction equipment pools; maintain individual combat readiness and perform tasks required in combat and disaster preparedness or recovery operations.

At the master chief petty officer level, they merge with all other construction ratings as a master chief seabee (abbreviated as CBCM).

== See also ==
- Heavy equipment operator

== See also ==
- List of United States Navy ratings
