= Homemakers (magazine) =

Canadian magazine

- Frequency: Nine per year
- Founded: 1966
- Final issue: 2011
- Company: Transcontinental Media
- Country: Canada
- Based in: Toronto
- Language: English
- Website: Archived 2012-03-16 at the Wayback Machine
- ISSN: 0318-7802

Homemakers was a Canadian magazine that covered women's lifestyles, published nine times a year. The magazine existed between 1966 and 2011. It offered recipes and articles on food, health, style, home and living. The headquarters was in Toronto.

== History and profile ==
The magazine started in 1966 with the name Homemaker's Digest, featuring shopping lists, housekeeping tips and cooking suggestions. The magazine was digest size until April 2003, when it switched to travel- or super-digest size (9½" × 6¼"). The magazine's editorial coverage was expanded to include articles about issues such as women's rights and feminism while still offering information such as healthy recipes and fashion inspiration.

In 2000, Homemakers and its French-language counterpart Madame changed ownership from Telemedia to Transcontinental Media GP. The same year Homemakers sold 883,000 copies.

In October 2011, it was announced that the magazine was closing, and the holiday 2011 issue was to be the last printed.
