= Engineman =

United States Navy occupational rating

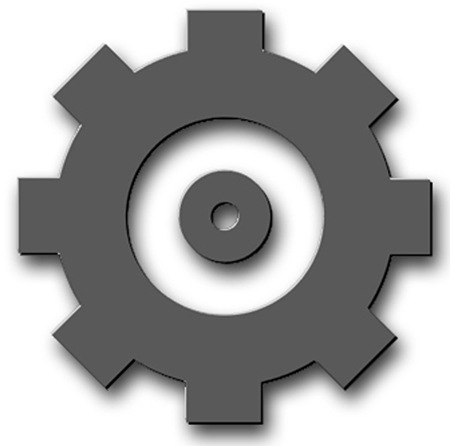
- Rating insignia
- Issued by: United States Navy
- Type: Enlisted rating
- Abbreviation: EN
- Specialty: Engineering

Engineman (abbreviated as EN) is a United States Navy occupational rating. Engineman was the former name for the current U.S. Coast Guard rating of Machinery Technician.

== History ==
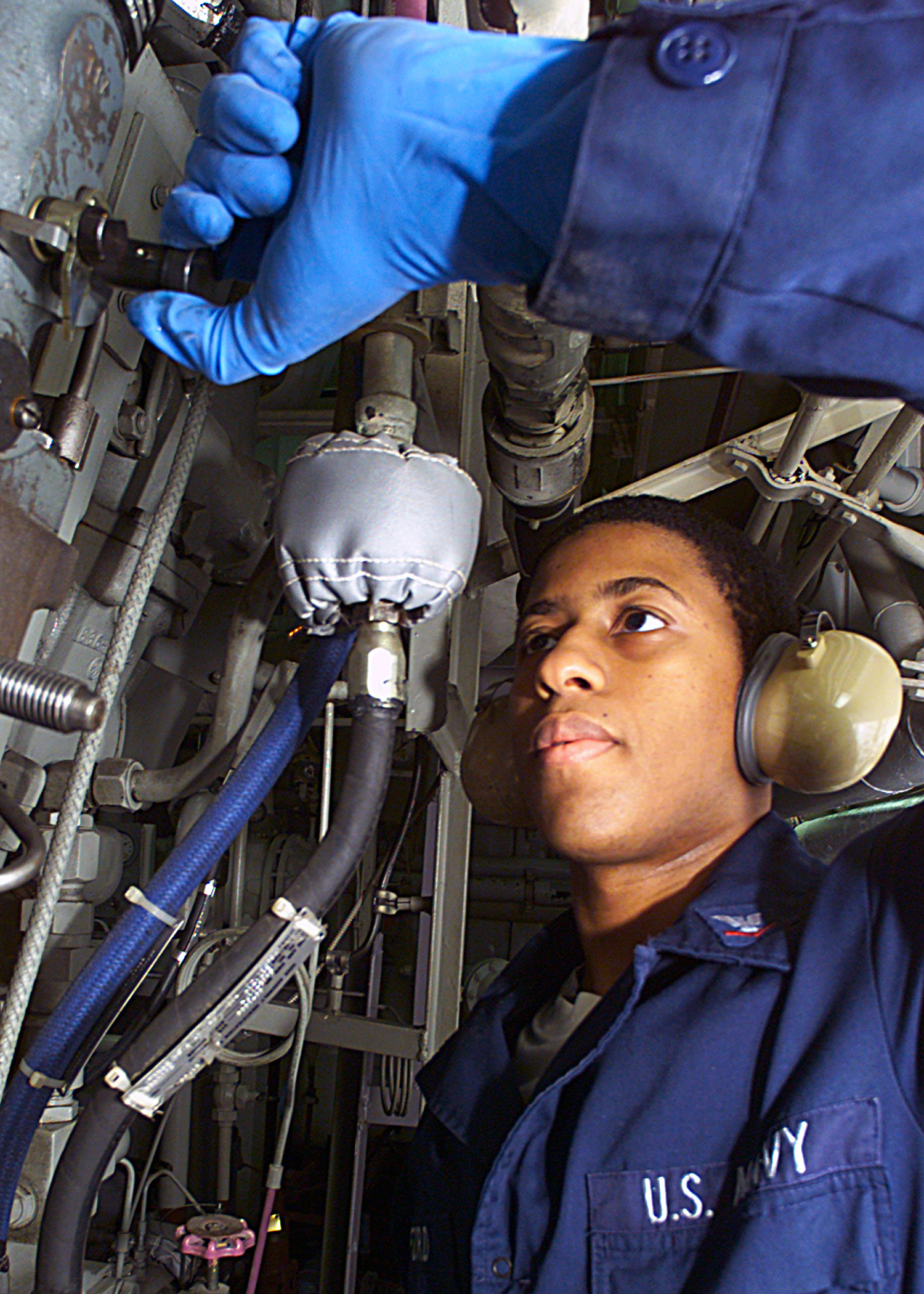
A U.S. Navy engineman at work aboard the USS Kearsarge (LHD-3) in March 2003.

Enginemen operate, service and repair internal combustion engines used to power some of the Navy's ships and most of the Navy's small craft. Most Enginemen work with diesel engines. Enginemen also operate and maintain electrohydraulic controllable-pitch propeller systems and steering engines, refrigeration and air conditioning systems, air compressors, desalinization plants and small auxiliary boilers.

- aligning fuel, water and air piping systems and controlling operation of diesel engines used for ship and small craft propulsion, and to generate electrical power;
- cleaning, lubricating, adjusting, testing and performing other preventive maintenance on diesel engines, reduction gears, air compressors, hydraulic or pneumatic clutches, steering engines and controllable-pitch propeller systems;
- operating and maintaining desalinization plants used to make fresh water from sea water;
- repairing or replacing valves, pumps, compressors, heat exchangers and control devices used with diesel engines and gas turbines; making entries into and analyze machinery operating records and reports.

== Rating structure ==
1. Engineman Fireman Recruit (ENFR)
2. Engineman Fireman Apprentice (ENFA)
3. Engineman Fireman (ENFN)
4. Engineman Third Class (EN3)
5. Engineman Second Class (EN2)
6. Engineman First Class (EN1)
7. Chief Engineman (ENC)
8. Senior Chief Engineman (ENCS)
9. Master Chief Engineman (ENCM)

== See also ==
- List of United States Navy ratings
