= Aviation electronics technician (United States Navy) =

US Navy enlisted rating or job specialty

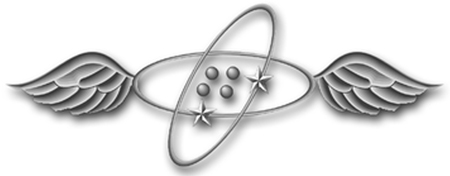
- Rating insignia
- Issued by: United States Navy
- Type: Enlisted rating
- Abbreviation: AT
- Specialty: Aviation

Aviation electronics technician (AT) is a US Navy enlisted rating or job specialty (often called MOS or AFSC by other services). At the paygrade of E-9 (master chief petty officer), ATs merge with the aviation electrician's mate (AE) rating to become avionics technicians (AV). Aviation electronics technicians wear the specialty mark of a winged helium atom.

Aviation electronics technicians (intermediate) perform intermediate level maintenance on aviation electronic components supported by conventional and automatic test equipment, including repair of weapons replaceable assemblies and shop replaceable assemblies and perform test equipment calibration/repair and associated test bench maintenance.

Aviation electronics technicians (organizational) perform organizational level maintenance on aviation electronics systems, to include: communications, radar, navigation, antisubmarine warfare sensors, electronic warfare, data link, fire control and tactical displays with associated equipment.

== History ==
The rating now known as AT can trace its origin to World War II, when the rating of aviation radio technician was established on 11 December 1942. This rating was re-designated aviation electronics technician's mate on 31 October 1945. Effective 2 April 1948 the name of the rating became aviation electronics technician (AET); the abbreviation was changed to (AT) on 9 June of the same year. A separate rating, aviation electronicsman was absorbed in 1955.

The former ratings of aviation fire control technician (AQ) and aviation antisubmarine warfare technician (AX) were absorbed into the AT rating effective 1 January 1991.

ATs were at one time further subdivided into aircraft equipment, ground equipment, radio and navigation equipment, radar and navigation equipment, ordnance and airborne CIC equipment. The ground equipment duties are now served by an aircraft support equipmentman. The ordnance duties remain a separate rating, and these personnel currently conduct far less electronics troubleshooting. Their training is more aligned with explosives-handling. All of the other subdivisions have since been re-merged back into the AT rating.

== General information ==
ATs perform duties at sea and ashore all over the world. They may work indoors, outdoors, in a shop environment, in an aircraft squadron or on an aircraft carrier. They work closely with others, require little supervision, and do mental and physical work of a technical nature.

ATs, as well as the other members of the Navy's aviation community, are sometimes referred to as "Airedales" by those in the surface or submarine forces. They are sometimes referred to as "trons", or "tweaks" or twigets (in the case of calibration technicians).

Billy C. Sanders, the fifth Master Chief Petty Officer of the Navy, first served as an aviation electronics technician.

== Different types ==
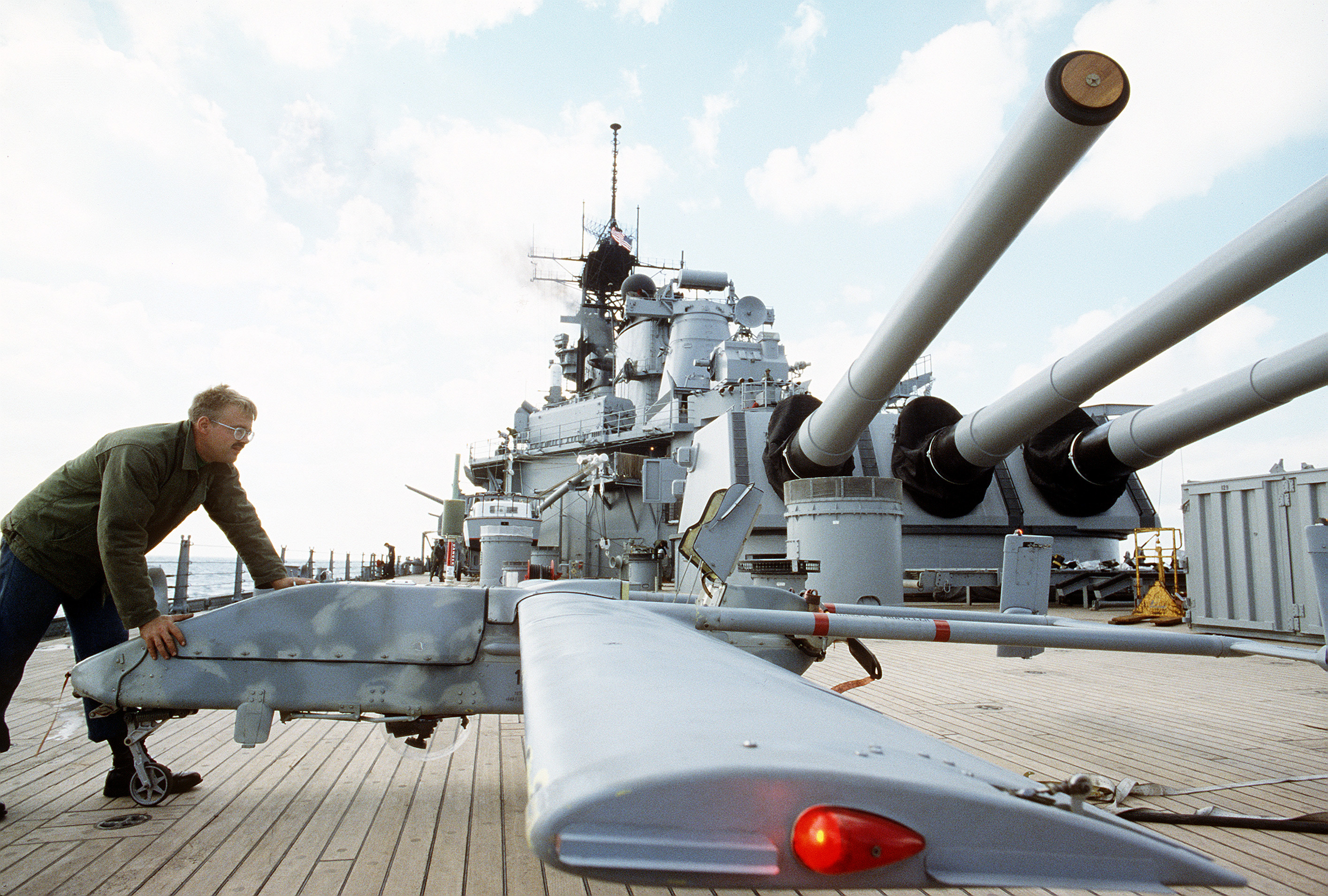
A technician moves a Pioneer RPV across the fantail of Wisconsin.

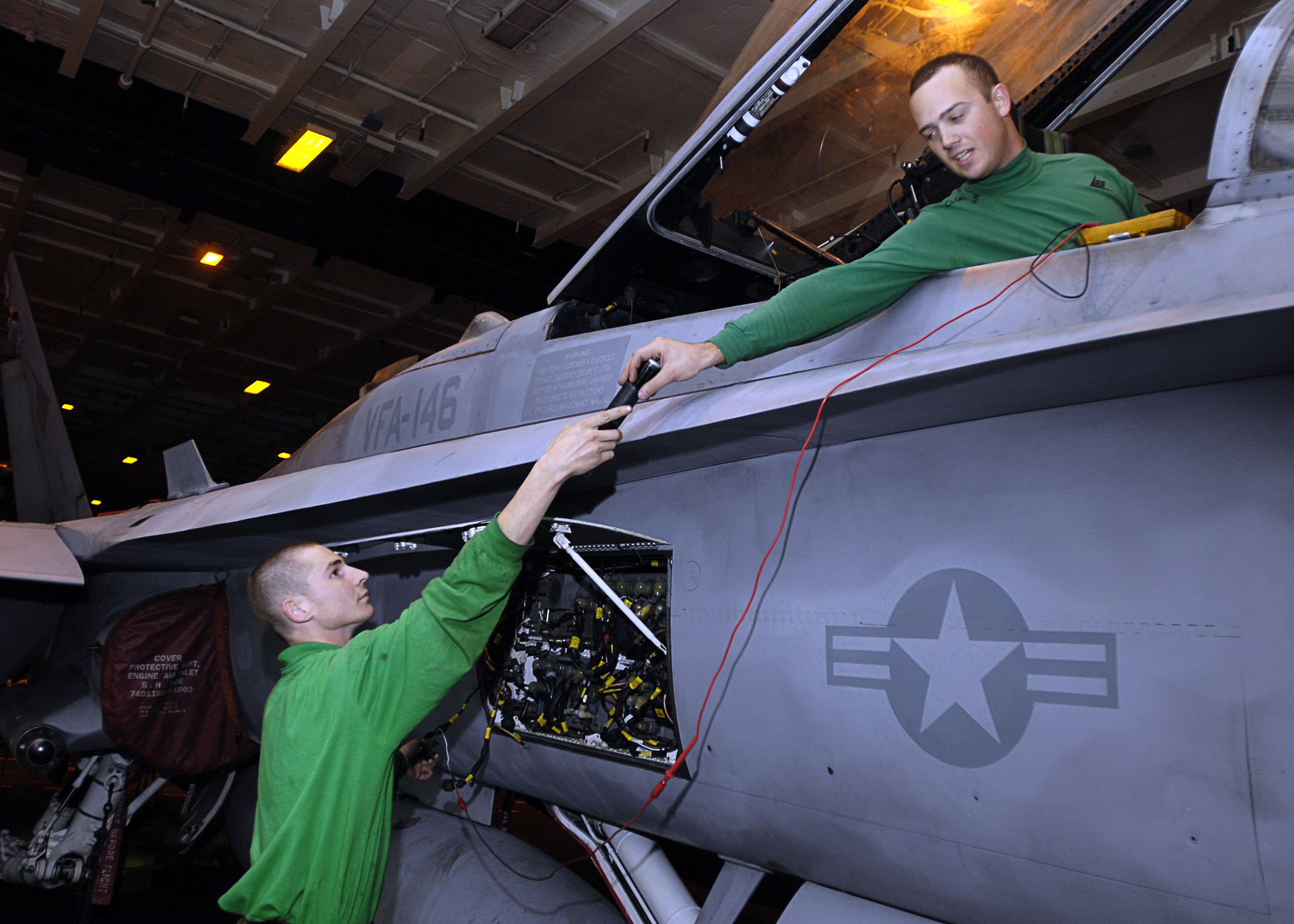
ATs troubleshooting the electrical system on an F/A-18C Hornet trying to get it up before maintenance meeting.

There are currently two types of ATs: intermediate (I-level) and organizational (O-level). These two levels do not affect their rate insignia or change how they are addressed (an AT3 is an AT3, regardless of I- or O-level). However, their duties are significantly different, and I-level and O-level ATs take different advancement exams, as if they were different ratings. Furthermore, I-level technicians' A-school is twice as long as O-level technicians.

I-level technicians work on the individual printed circuit boards within an actual component such as a radio. They are the technicians that connect the component to a test bench to simulate an aircraft, and troubleshoot and repair the equipment. In some instances the technician will not repair specific circuit card assemblies (CCAs); these CCAs will either go to depot level or back to the original manufacturer for repair. I-level AT's are usually assigned to fleet readiness centers on shore or Aircraft Intermediate Maintenance Departments aboard ships. I-level AT's are expected to have some electronics engineering knowledge, and are not generally expected to know much about aircraft-specific systems.

O-level technicians troubleshoot various discrepancies with the use of multimeters and avionics test equipment to locate faults within the aircraft. An O-level AT will determine if the discrepancy that the aircrew reported is an aircraft-wiring problem or a system problem. If the problem is aircraft wiring, the AT will repair the wiring problem on the aircraft. If the problem is determined to be an assembled component of a system, the assembly will be removed and turned in to AIMD for repair. The assembly can be replaced with parts that the squadron may keep as spares in order to keep the aircraft operational. Keeping spare parts at the squadron-level is usually not standard operating procedure, but these rules are frequently relaxed during intense operations due to the need for expedient turn-around. In addition to their separate duties as electronics technicians, O-level AT's are sometimes combined with aviation electrician's mates and aviation ordnancemen into a work center called IWT (integrated weapons team). As electronics have migrated into other aircraft systems (such as flight control and weapons control), the IWT team is given the duties of maintaining specifically the armament and weapons systems, whereas a separate AT workcenter is responsible for non-weapons based electronics such as communications and navigation. This is usually done at the organizational level, and is not Navy-wide. O-level AT's are assigned to squadrons and perform most of their work on the flight deck or in hangar bays of carriers, and on the flight line or in the aircraft hangars on land. These ATs are expected to have a detailed understanding of how the systems interface with the aircraft.

== See also ==
- Aviation electrician's mate
- Electronics Technician (United States Navy)
