= Air traffic controller (United States Navy) =

US Navy occupational rating

Air traffic controllers
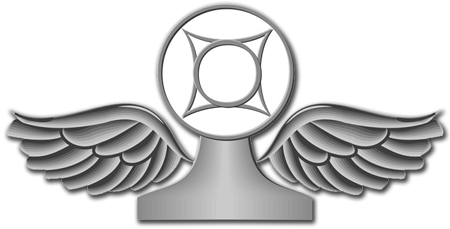
- Rating insignia
- Issued by: United States Navy
- Type: Enlisted rating
- Abbreviation: AC
- Specialty: Aviation

Air traffic controller (abbreviated to AC) is a United States Navy occupational rating.

== General description ==
Navy air traffic controllers perform duties similar to civilian air traffic controllers and play a key role in the effective use of naval airpower throughout the world in operational and training environments. Navy ACs are responsible for safely and effectively directing aircraft operating from airfields or the decks of aircraft carriers. They also control the movement of aircraft and vehicles on airfield taxiways and issue flight instructions to pilots by radio. Air traffic controllers provide air traffic control services in air traffic control towers, radar air traffic control facilities, fleet area control and surveillance facilities, and air operations offices ashore and afloat. They also operate radio communication systems and light signals, direct aircraft under visual flight rules and instrument flight rules conditions, and operate surveillance radar, precision radar, data link approach systems and secondary surveillance radar (IFF) equipment. Other tasks include operation of ground and shipboard controlled approach systems, response to emergency air traffic situations, maintenance of current flight planning information and reference material, assistance of pilots in preparation and processing flight plans and clearances. Air Traffic Controllers are trained at the Air Traffic Control “A” school at the Naval Air Technical Training Center in Pensacola, Florida. There, both Navy Sailors and Marines undergo a rigorous 15-week training course which includes lengthy academic courses, both tower and radar controlling simulations and flight physicals to insure they meet the medical standards required of all air traffic controllers. Standards for entry into the AC field are high, but once accepted into the field, Navy ACs enjoy a demanding and highly rewarding career. It is a five-year enlistment program.

== History ==
When first established, the AC rating was known as Air Controlman. It was changed to Air Traffic Controller per BUPERSNOTE 1220 of 1o December 1977 without change in abbreviation. The AC rating was originally established in 1948 from the now disestablished ratings of Specialist (Y) (Control Tower Operators), Radarman, Specialist (X) (Air Station Operations Desk (Time Shack), Specialist (X) (Operations—Plotting and Chart Work), and Specialist (V) (Transport Airmen).

== Duties ==
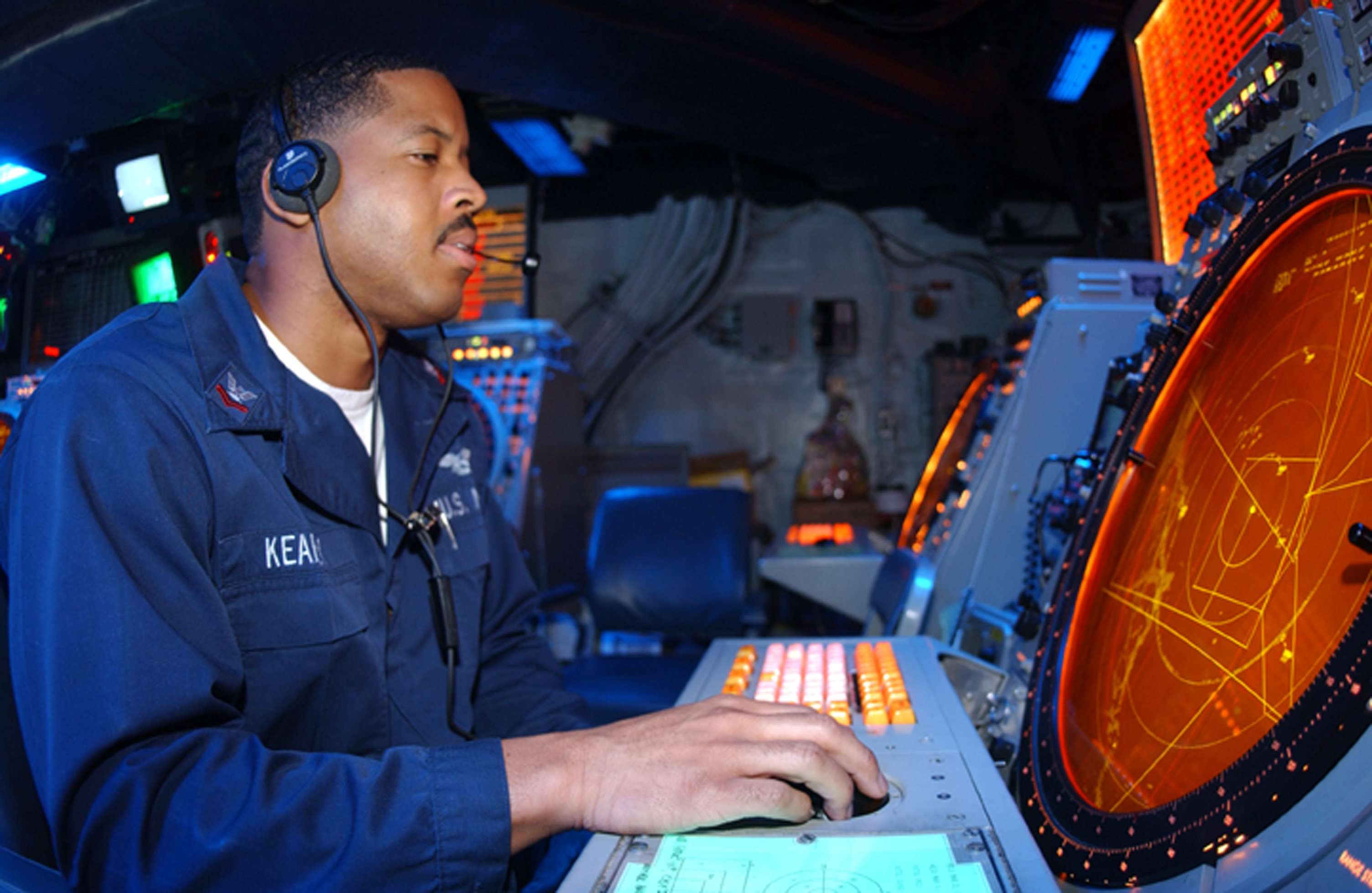
An air traffic controller 2nd class monitors a radar display for returning helicopters on the USS Bonhomme Richard.

Specific duties include:

- Controlling and directing air traffic at airfields and on aircraft carriers and large amphibious assault shipsusing radio, radar, and other signaling devices.
- Providing aircraft with critical information on other air traffic, navigation systems, and airfield conditions essential to safe operations.
- Operating and adjusting computer-based ground/carrier-controlled navigation and radar approach systems.
- Interpreting data shown on radar screens and plotting aircraft positions.
- Maintaining aeronautical charts and maps.

== Working environment ==
ACs usually work in clean, office-like environments at naval air stations and on board aircraft carriers. They work closely with others, are closely supervised, and do mostly mental work.

== See also ==
- List of United States Navy ratings
