= Retail services specialist =

American Navy position

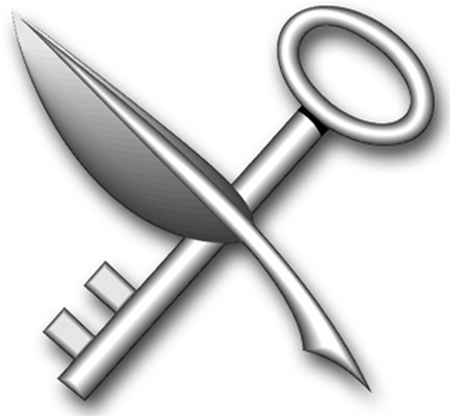
- Rating insignia
- Issued by: United States Navy
- Type: Enlisted rating
- Abbreviation: RS
- Specialty: Administration

Retail services specialist (RS) is a rating in the United States Navy. RSes are responsible for managing and operating all shipboard retail and service activities, including the ship's store, vending machines, coffee kiosks (on aircraft carriers), barber shops and laundry operations. They play a large role in maintaining the morale aboard a ship.

== History ==
The RS rating was established on October 1, 2019, with the renaming of the existing ship's serviceman (SH). The SH rating was established in 1943 in four specialty ratings: Ship's serviceman B (barber) (SSMB), ship's serviceman C (cobbler) (SSMC), ship's serviceman L (laundryman) (SSML) and ship's serviceman T (tailor) (SSMT). In April 1948, the four specialty ratings were merged into a single rating. The rating abbreviation was changed to SH. SHs specialized as barbers, cobblers, laundrymen, store clerks or tailors in pay grades E-3 and E-4.

== Duties ==
Retail services specialists perform the following duties:

- Managing and operating retail and service activities afloat
- E-Commerce
- Procuring ship's store stock
- Receiving and managing retail inventory
- Maintaining financial records and accounting systems
- Maintaining inventory and procurement databases
- Managing and operating ship's barber shops
- Serving as Navy Cash Collections Agents
- Operating and maintaining vending and Navy Cash ATM machines
- Managing and operating ship's laundry services
- Hospitality services
