= Mass communication specialist =

United States Navy public affairs type rating

Mass Communication Specialist
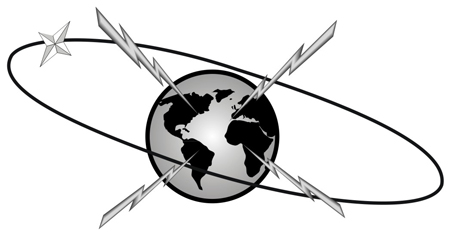
- Rating insignia
- Issued by: United States Navy
- Type: Enlisted rating
- Abbreviation: MC
- Specialty: Communication and Experience Design

Mass Communication Specialist (abbreviated as MC) is a United States Navy public affairs type rating. MCs practice human-centered design to develop creative communication solutions and align communication strategies and tactics to leadership's intent; conduct research and develop audience profiles; prepare, process, and print publications and media products; create sketches, storyboards, and graphics; design publications; produce still imagery, and written, audio, video, and multimedia information products; collect, analyze, and report media project and communication plan feedback and performance information; create media project plans; conduct community outreach, news media operations, leadership communication operations, and organizational communication operations; plan and direct communication campaigns and events and serve as communication advisors to commanders; and develop content strategies, create data stories, and ensure communication products and experiences are designed to enhance understanding and discoverability. MCs serve aboard ships, in expeditionary units and at shore commands in the United States and overseas.

== History ==
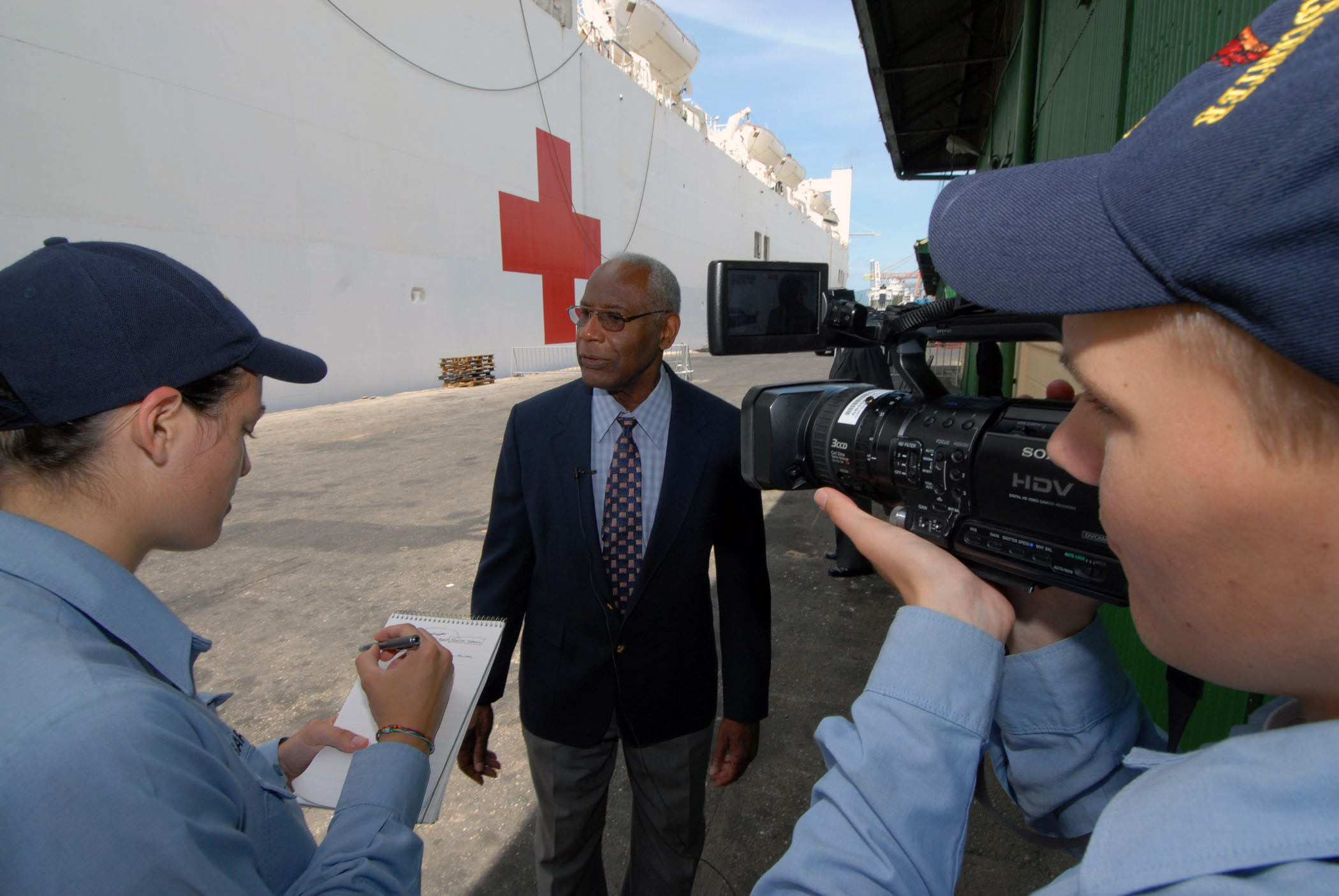
A pair of mass communication specialists interviewing the US ambassador to Trinidad and Tobago, Roy Austin in September 2007

The Navy MC rating was established on July 1, 2006, when the illustrator draftsman, journalist, lithographer and photographer's mate ratings merged. The merge of the four legacy ratings was announced by the Chief of Naval Operations in NAVADMIN 339/05. The legacy ratings were merged to improve efficiency, support optimal manning, and better align the rating with commercial industry practices.

=== Predecessor ratings ===
Illustrator draftsman (DM). The Draftsman rating was established in 1948 from the ratings of Carpenter's Mate (CB) (Draftsman), Electrician's Mate (CB) (Draftsman), Shipfitter (CS) (Mechanical Draftsmen), Specialist (X) (Engineering Draftsman), Specialist (X) (Topographic Draftsman), Specialist (X) (Cartographers), and Specialist (P) (Photogrammetry). The Draftsman rating was changed to Illustrator Draftsman in 1959.

Journalist (JO). The Journalist rating was established in 1948 from the ratings of Specialist (X) (Journalists), Specialist (X) (Naval Correspondents), and Specialist (X) (Public Information).

Lithographer (LI). The Lithographer rating was established in 1948 from the ratings of Specialist (P) (Photographic Specialists), Printer, Printer (L) (Lithographers), and Printer (M) (Offset Process).

Photographer's mate (PH). The Photographer rating was established in 1921 and was changed to Photographer's Mate in 1942. Photographer's Mate split into Photographer's Mate and Aviation Photographer's Mate in 1948 and then combined as Photographer's Mate in 1952.

== Mass Communication Specialist career information ==
Most Navy MCs are recruited into the rating; attend boot camp at Recruit Training Command, Great Lakes, Illinois; and report to the Defense Information School at Ft. Meade, Maryland for the six-month Mass Communication Foundations course.

Depending on MC manning throughout the Fleet, Professional Apprentice Career Track (PACT) Sailors may have limited opportunities to become an MC through on-the-job training, submission of a well-rounded MC portfolio and a published rating entry designation quota.

There also may be limited opportunities for Sailors in overmanned ratings to cross- rate into the MC rating using Career Waypoints. Career Waypoints is the Navy's long-term force management tool, balancing enlisted manning through the Navy-wide control of reenlistment and enlistment contract extension quotas. View the Navy Personnel Command's Career Waypoints page on www.npc.navy.mil.

=== MC job titles ===
The work performed by MCs fall into five job titles:

==== Content developer ====
Content developers create graphics, audio, photographic, video, and written content for distribution in various communication channels; create interactive visualizations, animations, and linear and non-linear multimedia products; design publications; create sketches and storyboards; and write speeches, information stories, and data stories.

==== Production manager ====
Production managers prepare, process, and print materials; collect, analyze, and report media project feedback information; conduct user and customer interviews; upload digital content to accessioning points; design and manage digital archives and file management systems; and maintain in media network equipment and systems.

==== Creative director ====
Creative directors design communication campaigns, lead creative teams, and provide communication product feedback; design branding constructs and indicators; facilitate ideation sessions; interpret digital content performance and report communication and visual information plan effectiveness; oversee Define, Ideate, Create, and Evaluate (DICE) creative processes; and provide direction and guidance to creative teams.

==== Communication director ====
Communication directors conduct news media operations, leadership communication, community outreach and organizational communication campaigns. They arrange, coordinate and define the employment of Navy communicators for deployments, operations and exercises; manage operational documentation missions; collect and analyze quantitative data; report quantitative data analysis findings; and release communication products and information.

==== User experience director ====
User experience directors practice human-centered design to develop creative communication solutions and align communication strategies and tactics to leadership's intent; conduct research; develop audience profiles; manage inclusive design programs and the usability of communication delivery systems and channels; and develop unit content strategies.

=== MC NECs ===
The Navy Enlisted Classification (NEC) system supports the enlisted rating structure in identifying personnel and billets in manpower authorizations. NEC codes identify a non-rating wide skill, knowledge, aptitude, or qualification that must be documented to identify both people and billets for management purposes. The most current information regarding NECs can be found in the Navy NEOCS Manual.

The Navy announced in NAVADMIN 174/17 a change to the NEC construct and a realignment of the enlisted rating communities and career fields.

MCs are part of the Executive Support Community.

There are 15 MC-related NECs.:

MC-related Navy Enlisted Classifications
New NEC	Old NEC	NEC Title	NEC awarding source
757A	3251	Broadcast Operations Director	DINFOS: Broadcast Management Course
*	5345	SCUBA Diver	Navy Diving and Salvage Training Center: SCUBA Diver Course
A03A	8142	Broadcast Reporter	DINFOS: Advanced Electronic Journalism Course
A04A	8143	Multimedia Cameraman	DINFOS: Intermediate Videography Course
A05A	8144	Multimedia Director/Producer	Advanced Visual Journalism Program (Syracuse)
A06A	8145	Content Manager	DINFOS: Content Management Course
A07A	8147	Photojournalism Journeyman	DINFOS: Intermediate Photography Course
A08A	8148	Master Photojournalist	Advanced Visual Journalism Program (Syracuse)
A09A	8150	Broadcaster	DINFOS: Broadcast Communication Specialist Course
A10A	8151	Graphic Illustrator Journeyman	DINFOS: Digital Multimedia Course
A11A	8152	Public Affairs Officer (Enlisted)	DINFOS: Joint Intermediate Public Affairs Course
A12A	8153	Public Affairs Supervisor	DINFOS: PA Qualification Course
A13A	8154	Senior Enlisted Public Affairs Advisor	DINFOS: Joint Senior Public Affairs Course
775A	8193	Graphic Illustrator Apprentice	DINFOS: Basic Multimedia Illustrator Course
A18A	8288	Aerial Cameraman	Naval Aircrew Candidate School

*Note: NEC not yet converted to new NEC construct. Planned to be converted to new construct in 2018.

== See also ==
- List of United States Navy ratings
- Mass communication
