= Sonar technician =

United States Navy occupational rating

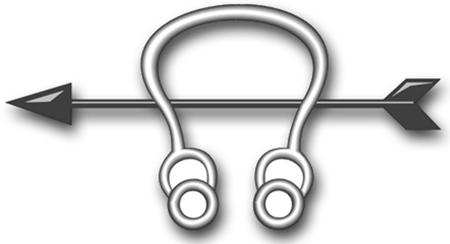
- Rating insignia
- Issued by: United States Navy
- Type: Enlisted rating
- Abbreviation: ST
- Specialty: Technical

Sonar technician (abbr. : ST) is a United States Navy occupational rating.

STs are responsible for underwater surveillance. They assist in safe navigation and aid in search, rescue and attack operations. They operate and repair sonar equipment. STs track underwater threats and send tracks to fire control (antisubmarine warfare controlling station) operator (ASWCS) for further evaluation and or destruction.

Sonar technicians are separated into two categories, STG (sonar technician surface) who are on surface ships and STS (sonar technician submarine) who operate on submarines.

Sonar technicians are colloquially referred to as "ping jockeys" on board surface vessels, after the sound of active sonar. They are also referred to as “shower techs” by other sailors on submarines, due to their alleged habit of using all the potable water.

== History ==
Established 1942

- SoM - Soundman
- SoMH - Soundman (harbor defense)

1943-1964

- SO - sonarman
  - SOG - Sonarman (sonar)
  - SOH - Sonarman (harbor defense)

1964–Present

- ST - Sonar technician
  - STG - Sonar technician (surface)
  - STS - Sonar technician (submarine)

== Sonar technician (Surface) (STG) ==
Sonar technicians, surface fleet (manipulate, control, evaluate, and interpret data) surface sonar, Towed array, and other oceanographic systems; operate surface ship underwater fire control systems (with associated equipment) for the solution of antisubmarine warfare problems, operate underwater communications, torpedo countermeasure equipment, depth finders for navigation, collect and disseminate bathythermograph data, calculate optimum performance; perform organizational and intermediate maintenance on surface sonar and allied equipment. Attached to WEAPONS Dept, aboard US NAVY ships.

== Sonar technician submarines (STS) ==
Sonar technician submarines operate (control, evaluate, and interpret data) submarine sonar, oceanographic equipment and submarine auxiliary sonar; coordinate submarine sonar and underwater interface; perform organizational and intermediate maintenance on submarine and allied equipment. During battle stations, sonarmen track targets, passing bearing information to fire control to refine speed, range and course. The result is a firing solution used to launch and guide torpedoes to their intended target(s).

The majority of the sonar used aboard submarines is passive, since active emissions give away a vessel's position. Active sonar is mainly used for under ice operations.

== See also ==
- List of United States Navy ratings
