= Aviation electrician's mate =

United States Navy rank

Aviation Electrician's Mate
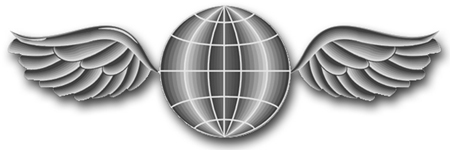
- Rating insignia
- Issued by: United States Navy
- Type: Enlisted rating
- Abbreviation: AE
- Specialty: Aviation Electrician

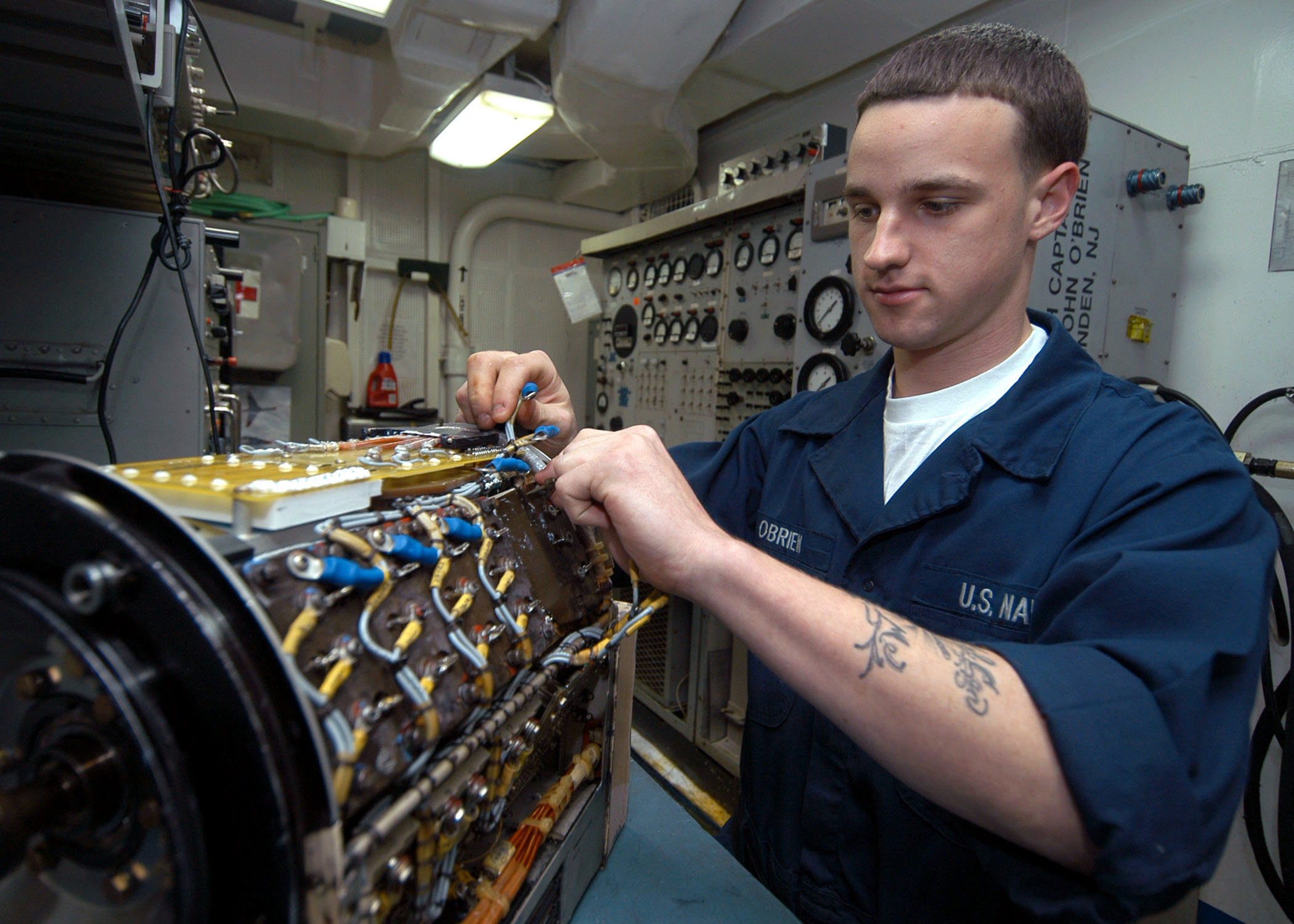
An Aviation Electrician's Mate replacing a silicon-controlled rectifier (SCR) on an F/A-18 Hornet generator

Aviation Electrician's Mate (abbreviated as AE) is a United States Navy occupational rating.

Originally established in 1942 as AEM, the Aviation Electrician's Mate rating was changed to AE in 1948.

Aviation Electrician's Mates maintain electrical and instrument systems, including power generation, conversion, and distribution systems; aircraft batteries; interior and exterior lighting; electrical control of aircraft systems, including hydraulic, landing gear, flight control, utility, and power plant engine, flight and non-instrument-type indicating and warning systems; automatic flight control and stabilization systems; aircraft compass systems; attitude reference systems; and inertial navigation systems. The primary "A" School training for AE's is located at Naval Aviation Technical Training Center aboard NAS Pensacola. There was another "A" School for AE's in NAS Jacksonville from which the last class graduated in May 2008. "A" school was also temporary moved to NAS Oceana in the early 2000 after a hurricane damaged facilities in NAS Pensacola. The last class to graduate from NAS Oceana was 31 October 2007. "C" Schools are located at various locations nationwide with the most common being NAS Lemoore, CA and NAS Oceana, VA.

== See also ==
- List of United States Navy ratings
