= Assault Craft Unit 2 =

Assault Craft Unit TWO
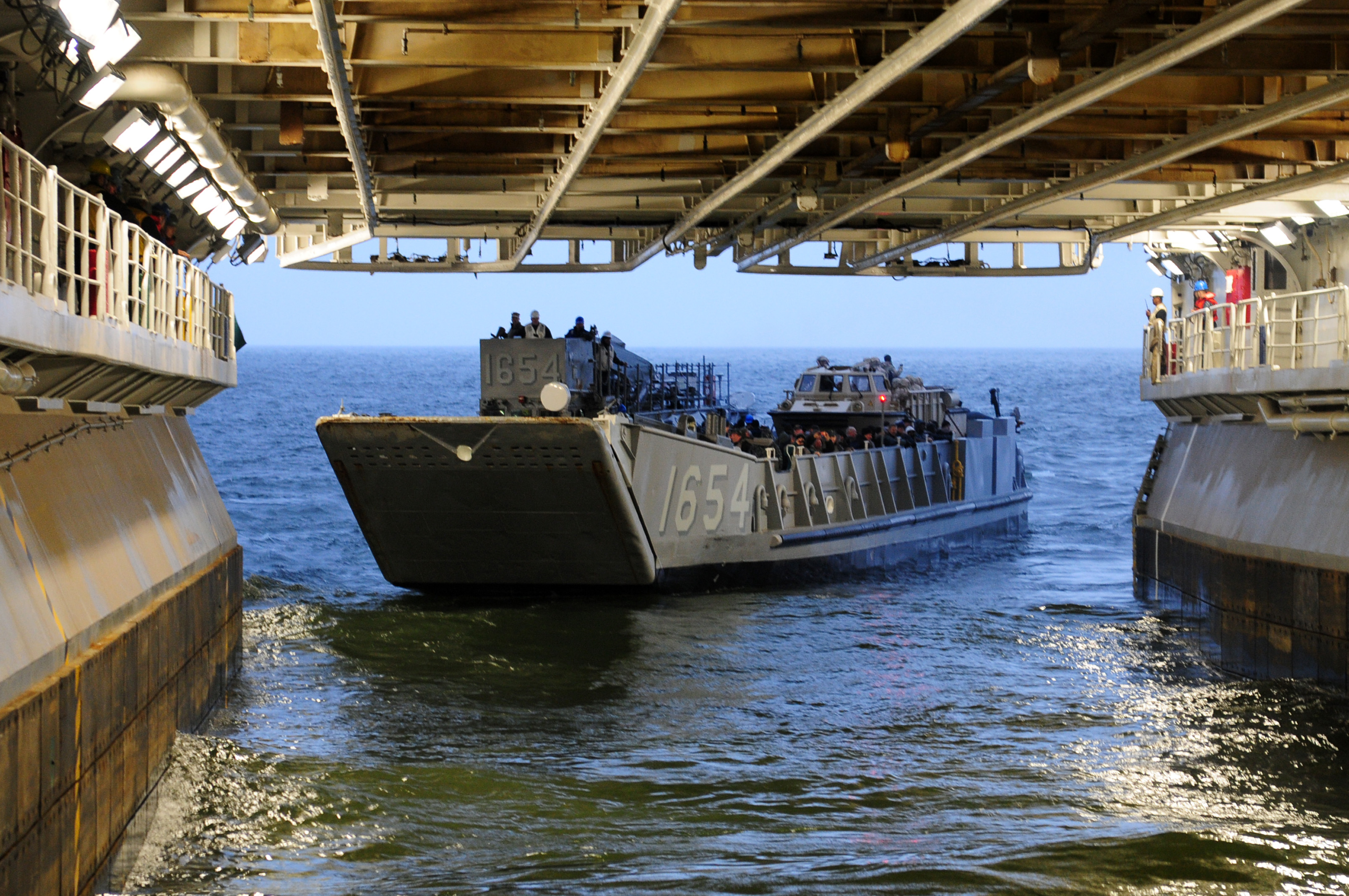
- US Navy Landing Craft Utility (LCU) 1654, assigned to Assault Craft Unit 2, departs the well deck of the amphibious assault ship
- Active: December 1959 – present
- Country: United States
- Branch: USN
- Garrison/HQ: Naval Amphibious Base Little Creek, Virginia
- Engagements: Korean War; Vietnam War; Operation Desert Storm; War on terror; Operation Iraqi Freedom

Commanders
- Notable commanders: Elaine Luria

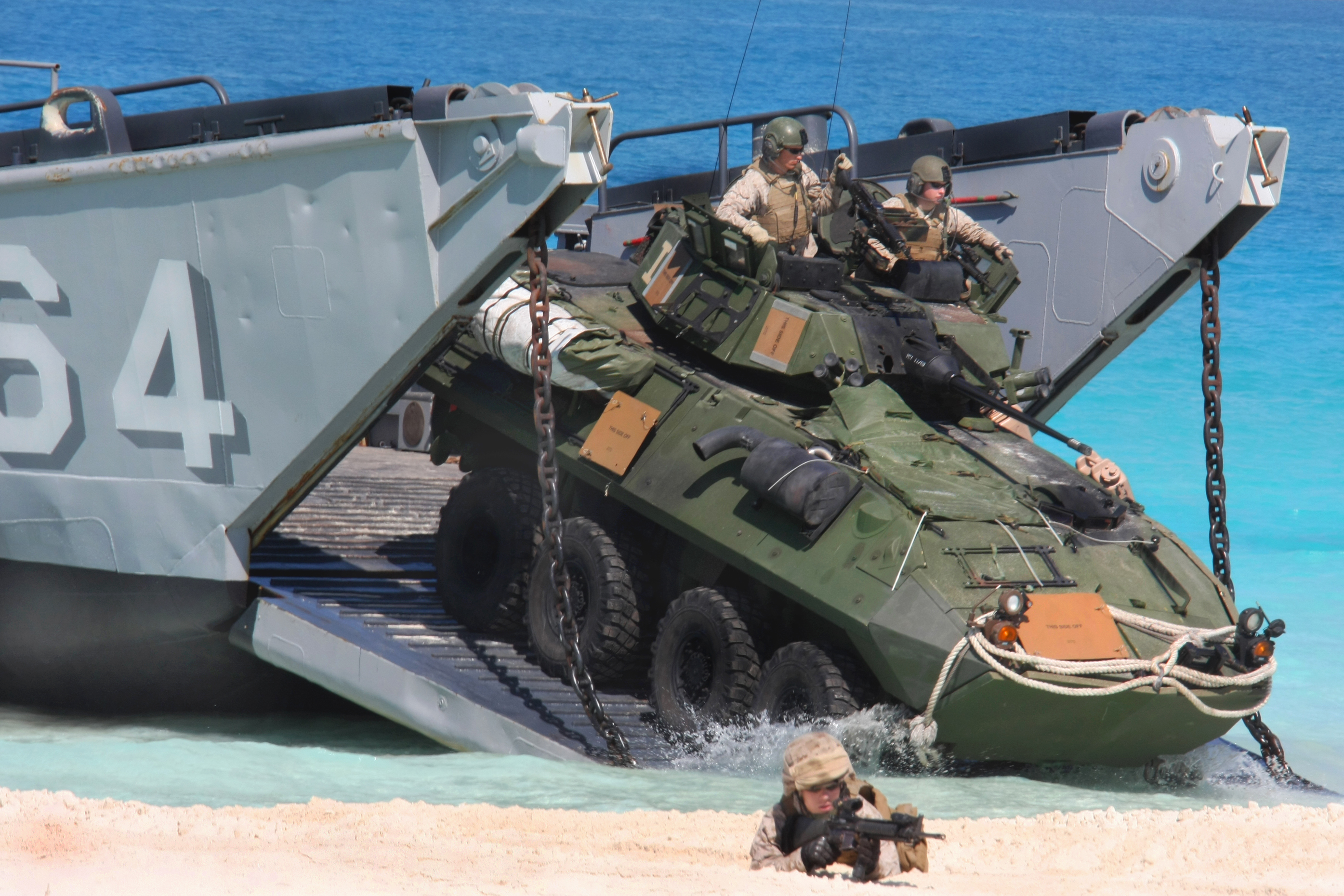
A light-armored vehicle assaults the beach from a landing craft utility from Assault Craft Unit 2 during an amphibious assault demonstration conducted as part of Bright Star 2009, Egypt, 12 Oct. 2009.

Assault Craft Unit TWO (ACU-2) is an Atlantic Ocean Maritime Prepositioning Force in the United States Navy operated under Naval Beach Group Two out of Naval Amphibious Base Little Creek, Virginia. ACU-2's force consists of Landing Craft Utility boats (LCU), Landing Craft Mechanized, Mark 8 boats (LCM), and Maritime Prepositioning Force Utility Boats (MPFUB). The sister unit of ACU-2 is Assault Craft Unit 1 in Naval Amphibious Base Coronado.

== History ==
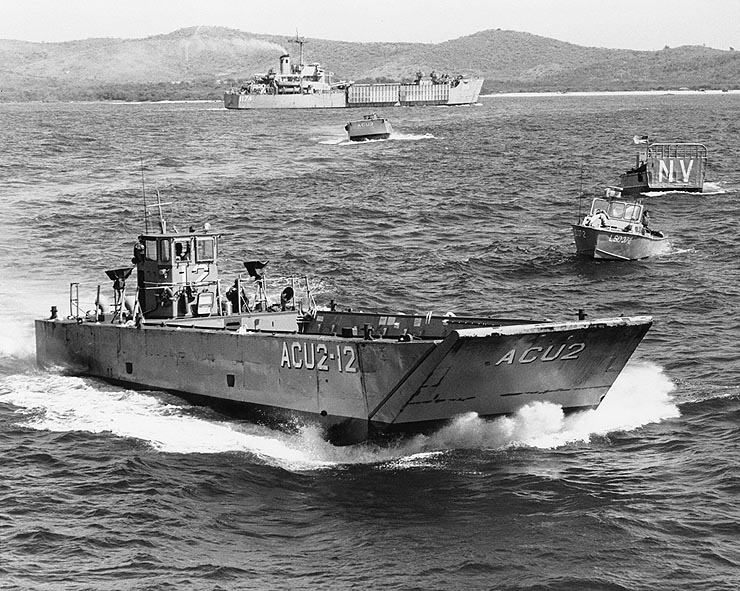
LCM-8 from ACU-2

Following World War II and the rise of the importance of a Sea to Shore connection, all Landing Craft were organized into Beach Party Battalions. The Beach Party Battalions joined and formed the Naval Beach Group TWO. Furthermore, in 1949 Boat Unit TWO and Beachmaster Unit TWO were added to Naval Beach Group TWO. Boat Unit TWO originally had LCM-6 craft and later gained the LCM-8 in 1957 and gained LCU's in 1959 when it merged with Landing Craft Squadron TWO. After the merger, Boat Unit TWO changed its name to Assault Craft Unit TWO (ACU TWO).

=== Notable campaigns or events ===
1980 – Cuban Refugees in the Florida Straights

1982 – PLO Evacuation from Beirut

1983 – Grenada Island Evacuation

1991 – Liberation of Kuwait - Desert Shield/Desert Storm

1994 – Restoration of Democracy in Haiti

1999 – Operation Allied Force

2006 – Joint Task Force Lebanon Civilian Evacuation

== Structure ==
The six departments of ACU-2 are Landing Craft, Administration, Repair, Medical, Operations, and Supply.

The most prevalent ratings at the command are Boatswain's Mates (BM), Enginemen (EN), Quartermasters (QM), and Undesignated Seamen (SN).

Secondary and support ratings at ACU-2 include Culinary Specialists (CS), Damage Controlmen (DC), Electrician's Mates (EM), Electronics Technicians (ET), Hull Maintenance Technicians (HT), Logistics Specialists (LS), Machinist's Mates (MM), Operations Specialists (OS), Navy Counselors (NC), and Yeomen (YN).

The LC department is divided into two divisions: LCU and MPF.

The LCU Division operates its LCUs which can make long deployments independently or aboard larger amphibious vessels such as LHDs and LHAs.

The MPF Department operate and maintain its LCM-8 and MPFUB crafts locally and are mobilized and flown to theaters to perform maritime prepositioning operations within 24 hours' notice.
