= Assault Craft Unit 1 =

Assault Craft Unit ONE
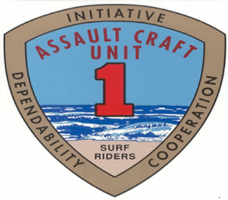
- Active: 01 June 1943 - Present
- Country: United States
- Branch: USN
- Garrison/HQ: NAB Coronado
- Nickname: Surf Riders
- Mottos: "Initiative, Dependability, Cooperation"
- Engagements: World War II; Korean War; Vietnam War; Operation Desert Storm; Operation Iraqi Freedom; War on terror

Commanders
- Current commander: CDR M. J. Blomberg

Assault Craft Unit ONE, (ACU-1) is a Pacific Ocean Maritime Prepositioning Force in the United States Navy operated under Naval Beach Group ONE out of Naval Amphibious Base (NAB) Coronado with a Forward Detachment in Sasebo, Japan. ACU-1's force consists of Landing Craft Utility (LCU) boats, Landing Craft Mechanized (LCM), Mark 8 boats, and Maritime Prepositioning Force Utility Boats (MPFUBs). The sister unit of ACU-1 is Assault Craft Unit 2 in Naval Amphibious Base Little Creek, Virginia.

== History ==
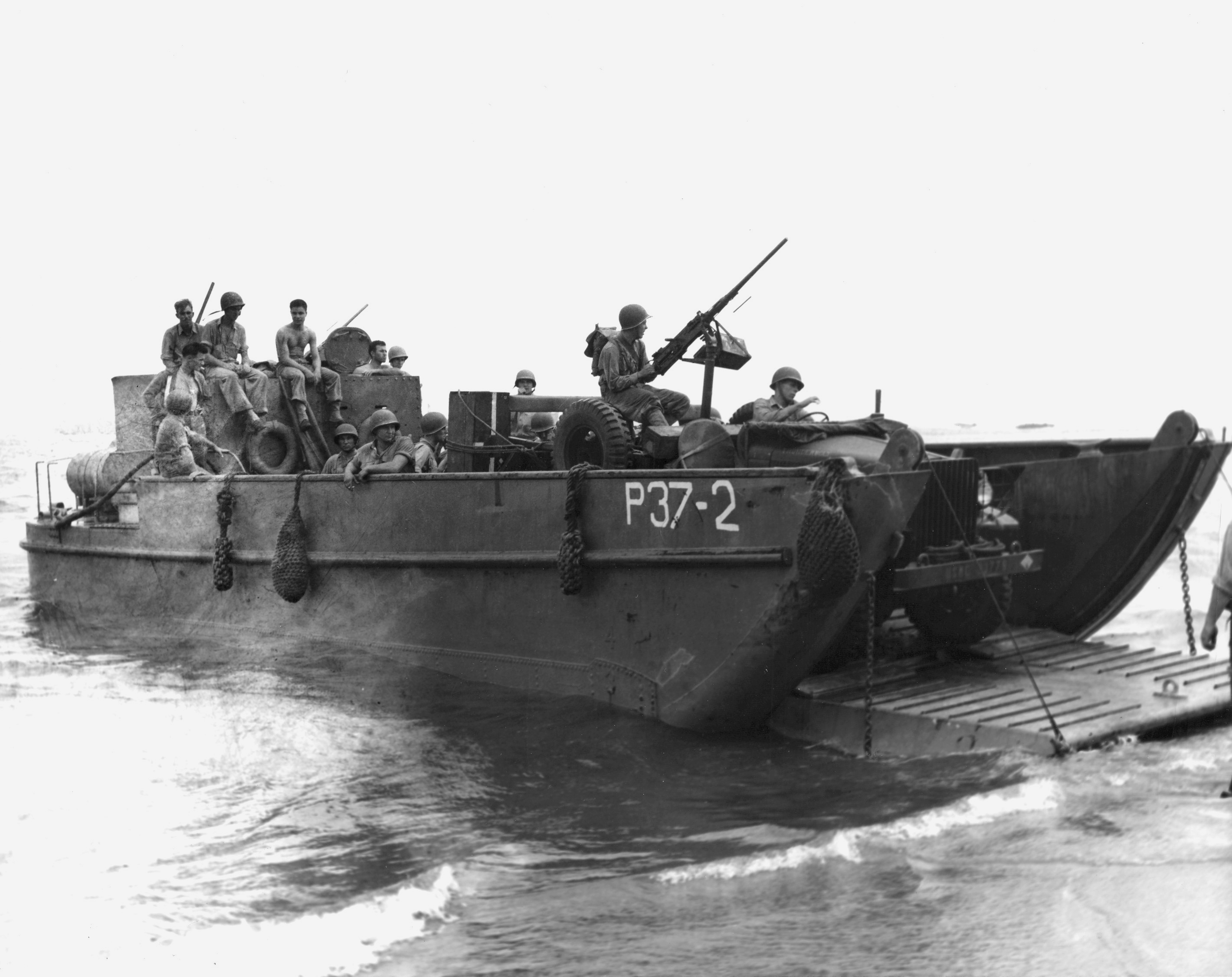
LCM beached on Guadalcanal (1942)

Assault Craft Unit 1 traces its roots to World War II as hundreds of LCUs were decommissioned, leaving 30 LCUs in the command of "Centralized Flotilla Command" in NAB Coronado known as LCU Squadron ONE. In July, 1947, a neighboring command, Boat Unit ONE, was created to command Landing Craft Mechanized (LCM) LCM-3s and Landing Craft, Vehicle, Personnel (LCVP)s. In 1950, the two commands participated in the Battle of Inchon and in every amphibious operation of the Korean War afterward.

In 1963, the LCU Squadron ONE and Boat Unit ONE were merged to make Assault Craft Squadron 1 (ACS-1). In 1968, the Chief of Naval Operations (CNO) directed to have ACS-1 and its Assault Craft Divisions ELEVEN, TWELVE and THIRTEEN be disestablished and reformed as Assault Craft Unit ONE (ACU 1).

In 1990, in response to the Gulf War, ACU-1 was a first responder, acting to transport and unload cargo from Maritime Prepositioning Ships using LCM-8s. Since the September 11 attacks, ACU-1 has operated outside of a strictly military role, providing humanitarian services and disaster relief. Recently, ACU-1 has operated with other Amphibious Battalions providing Military logistics for the Key Resolve/Foal Eagle Military exercise in South Korea.

=== LCU 1500 Memorial ===
On 28 February 1968, near Ocean View, Viet Nam, LCU 1500 was hit by a rocket, killing the Radioman. One year later, on 27 February 1969, while loading ammunition in Da Nang, an enemy rocket hit the nearly loaded craft and killed 13 crew aboard. On 14 March 1969, ACU-1 began an annual memorial to the 14 sailors that lost their lives on LCU 1500. At the ACU-1 compound on NAB Coronado, a recreational cabana was erected near its piers and painted to look like LCU 1500. The cabana houses pictures of the crew and ship as well as a memorial with the names of the slain Sailors.

== Structure ==
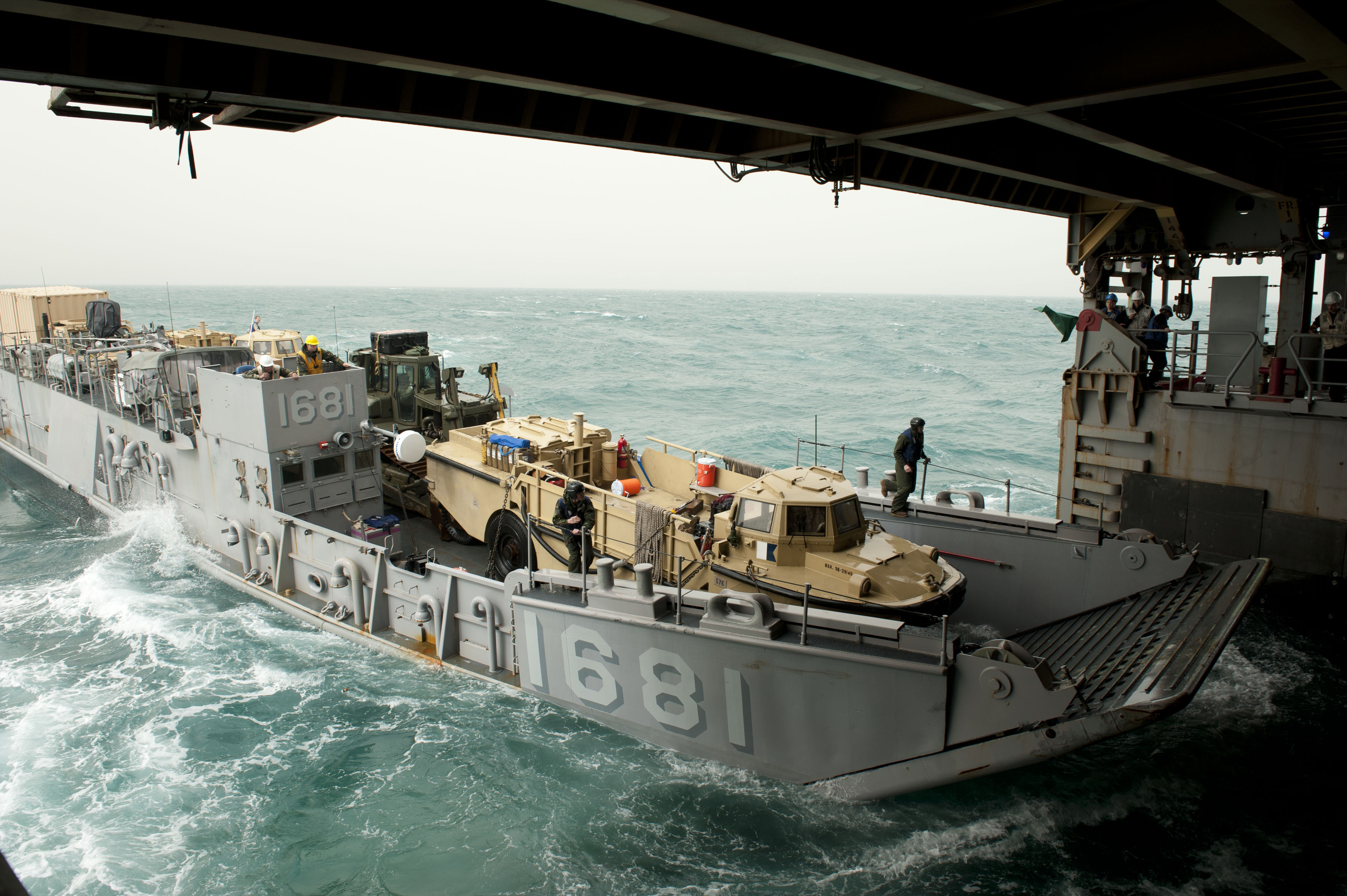
ACU-1 Landing Craft Utility enters the well deck of landing ship USS Pearl Harbor

The six departments of ACU-1 are Landing Craft, Administration, Engineering, Medical, Operations, and Supply. The most prevalent ratings at the command are Boatswain's Mates (BM), Enginemen (EN), Quartermasters (QM), and Undesignated Seamen (SN). Secondary and support ratings at ACU-1 include Culinary Specialists (CS), Damage Controlmen (DC), Electrician's Mates (EM), Hull Maintenance Technicians (HT), Logistics Specialists (LS), Machinist's Mates (MM), Operations Specialists (OS), Navy Counselors (NC), and Yeomen (YN).

The LC department is divided into three divisions; LCU, MPF, and MRF. The LCU Division operates its LCUs which can make long deployments independently or aboard larger amphibious vessels such as LHDs and LHAs. The MPF Department operate and maintain its LCM-8 and MPFUB crafts locally and are mobilized and flown to theaters to perform maritime prepositioning operations within 24 hours notice. The MRF Department operates 6 eleven-meter RHIBs for VBSS training and operation.

ACU-1 had its change of command on Dec. 1, 2017, at which time CDR Nathan W. Fugate took over as Commanding Officer.

== Awards ==
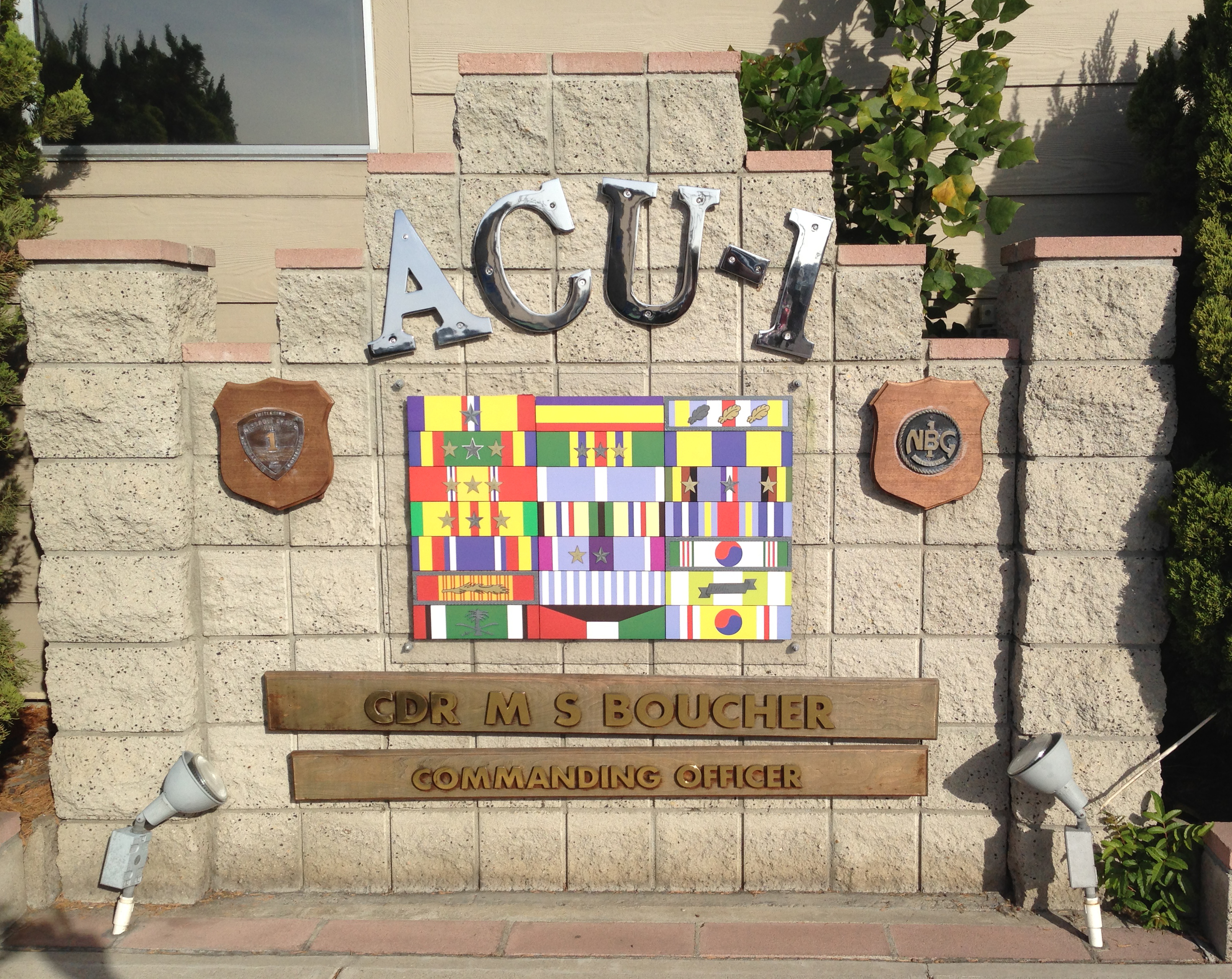
The ACU-1 sign outside its Quarterdeck in March 2013

Through its continuous operation from the Korean War through today, Assault Craft Unit ONE has been awarded 21 different medals, several with multiple awards.

Combat Action Ribbon with 5 Award Stars	Presidential Unit Citation	Joint Meritorious Unit Award with 7 Oak Leaf Clusters
Navy Unit Commendation with 7 Award Stars	Meritorious Unit Commendation with 11 Service Stars	Navy Expeditionary Medal
National Defense Service Medal with 3 Service Stars	Korean Service Medal	Armed Forces Expeditionary Medal with 7 Service Stars
Vietnam Service Medal with 7 Service Stars	Southwest Asia Service Medal	Global War on Terrorism Expeditionary Medal
Global War on Terrorism Service Medal	Humanitarian Service Medal with 6 Service Stars	Republic of Korea Presidential Unit Citation
Gallantry Cross (Vietnam) with Golden Palm and Gold frame	United Nations Korea Medal	Vietnam Campaign Medal
Kuwait Liberation Medal (Saudi Arabia)	Kuwait Liberation Medal (Kuwait)	Korean War Service Medal
