= Aquatrack =

Amphibious load vehicle

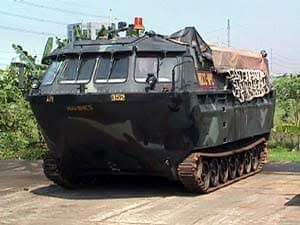
- One of the two Aquatracks of the Philippine Marine Corps.
- Place of origin: United Kingdom

Service history
- Used by: Philippine Marine Corps

Production history
- Designer: Glover Webb
- Manufacturer: Glover Webb/Alvis plc

Specifications
- Mass: 28,660 lb (12,999.96 kg)
- Length: 362.60 in (9.21 m)
- Width: 125.98 in (3.20 m)
- Height: 124.02 in (3.15 m)
- Crew: 2
- Engine: 1 Deutz BF8L513 diesel 315 hp (235 kW)
- Operational range: 500 km (310.69 mi)
- Maximum speed: Land:40 km/h (24.85 mph) Water:10 km/h (6.21 mph)

Aquatrack was developed by Glover Webb, which is a part of GKN Defense. The vehicle is a fully Amphibious Load Carrier with a 5 tonne cargo capacity, capable of carrying a vehicle, stores, or personnel on land and sea. Driven by its tracks or twin variable pitch propellers or both together, it can adapt to harsh environment such as mud, soft sand or frozen waste without any preparation. It moves from land into river, lake, or rough seas.

It is an original design featuring the same running gear as the latest version of the M113 armored personnel carrier. The Aquatrack is equipped with a hydraulically operated ramp incorporates a raised section to prevent swamping by a following sea, a ballast tank to maintain the trim, and a stern ramp, but also has a propeller for increased speed in the water. It is also equipped with GPS satellite positioning systems as standard and options include radar and communications equipment. The standard power unit is a 315 brake horsepower air-cooled 8 cylinder 13 litre diesel engine.

The vehicle can be fitted with a crane, a winch and cupola for light machine guns and is capable of being launched and recovered from a landing craft at sea.

== Current operators ==
Philippines

The only two vehicles sold by the British company GKN are operated by the Philippine Marine Corps due to their experience with Amphibious vehicles like the LVT and the LARC. One Vehicle retired and is on Display at Camp Bojeador Burgos, Ilocos Norte.
