= Naval Beach Group One =

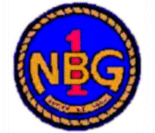
- NBG-1 insignia
- Active: 19 July 1948 - Present
- Country: United States
- Branch: United States Navy
- Role: Amphibious warfare
- Garrison/HQ: NAB Coronado, San Diego, California
- Motto: “United We Land”
- Engagements: Korean War; Vietnam War; Operation Desert Storm; Somali Civil War; Operation Restore Hope; Operation United Shield; War on terror; Operation Iraqi Freedom; Operation Inherent Resolve

Commanders
- Current commander: Captain Commodore Gary Leigh

Naval Beach Group One, (NBG-1) is a United States Navy amphibious unit based at Naval Amphibious Base Coronado in Coronado, California. Naval Beach Group Two is its sister unit based at Naval Amphibious Base Little Creek, Virginia.

== Mission ==
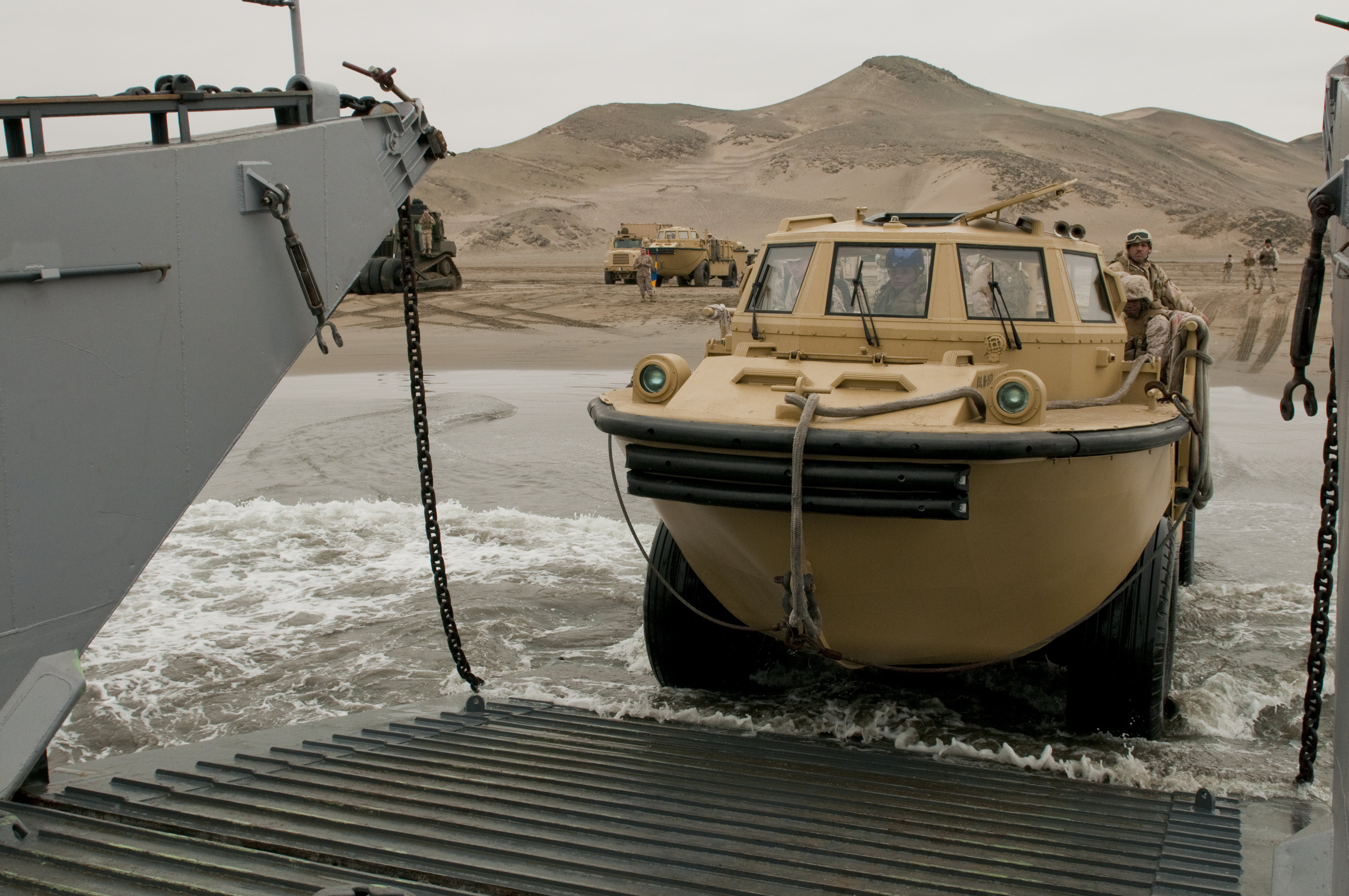
LARC-V vehicle, assigned to Beach Master Unit (BMU) 1, loading onto Landing Craft Utility (LCU)

Since its inception 19 July 1948, Naval Beach Group One (NBG-1) and its component commands have participated in a variety of amphibious operations. From the early years of assaults during the Korean and Vietnam conflicts to the modern and technically sophisticated amphibious operations in Somalia and Iraq, the men and women of NBG-1 have served throughout the Pacific and Indian Oceans in support of US policy abroad.

Commander, Naval Beach Group ONE (CNBG-1) functions under two distinct missions. During amphibious assaults, he provides personnel to support and operate causeway lighterage, LCACs, LCUs, buoyant ship-to-shore bulk fuel systems, beach traffic control, and beach salvage equipment. The second mission is under the Maritime Preposition Force (MPF) concept which uses the equipment and supplies prepositioned on board forward deployed Maritime Prepositioning ships (MPS). Joining forces with the Marine Expeditionary Brigade (MEB), CNBG-1 forms and commands the Naval Support Element (NSE) and is airlifted into an objective area to establish camp support, conduct ship-to-shore movement, beach party operations and debarkation operations in support of the offload of each MPF ship.

CNBG-1 is also responsible for conducting Amphibious Specialty Training (PHIBSPECTRA) for all US Pacific Fleet amphibious ships. The PHIBSPECTRA Team provides in-depth training in well deck operations to prepare Expeditionary Strike Group (ESG) ships for deployment to the Western Pacific and Indian Oceans.

== Units ==
The initial NBG-1 consisted of Headquarters Unit, Boat Unit ONE, which became Assault Craft Unit One, Amphibious Construction Battalion One, and Underwater Demolition Team One, which eventually shifted to the control of Naval Special Warfare Command. Additions to the organization have been Beachmaster Unit One (BMU-1) in 1949, Assault Craft Unit 5 (ACU-5) in 1983, and Naval Beach Unit Seven (NBU-7) in 2012. With the addition of ACU-5 came the ability to conduct over-the-horizon assaults using the swift Landing Craft Air Cushions.

== History ==
The need for a single organization dedicated to the support of amphibious operations was recognized as a result of experience gained during the island-hopping campaigns of World War II. The decision to consolidate amphibious assault assets led to the establishment of NBG-1 in July 1948.

=== Korean – Vietnam service ===
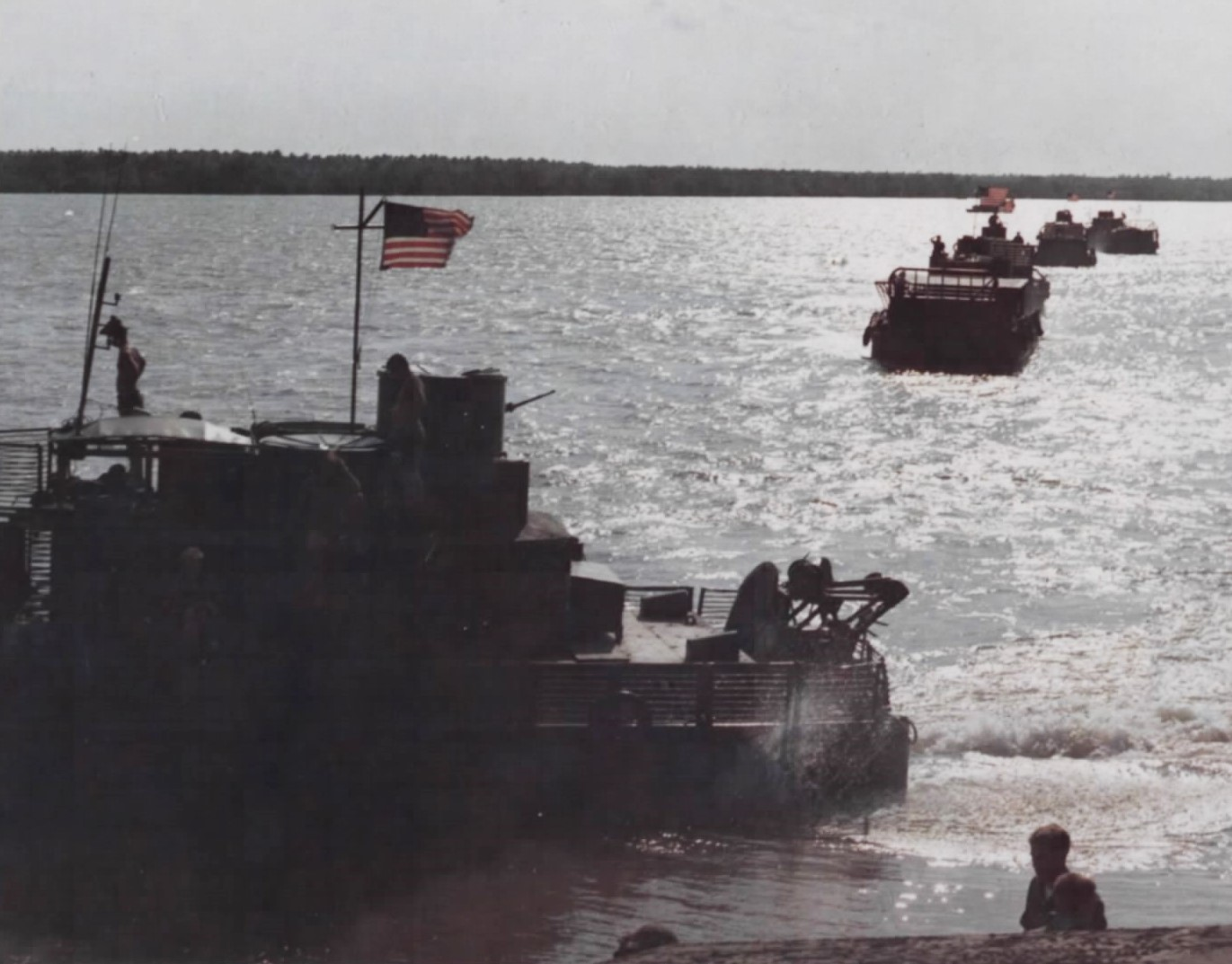
Navy Armored Troop Carriers in Vietnam

In 1950, Detachments of NBG-1 participated in amphibious assaults at Inchon and Pohang, Korea, and shortly thereafter in the evacuation of troops from Hungnam and Inchon. Late in 1954, another NBG-1 Detachment assisted Commander Task Force 90 in the withdrawal of French Union Military Forces and 300,000 Vietnamese refugees from Haiphong, French Indochina during Operation Passage to Freedom. NBG-1 Detachments took part in the evacuation of the Chinese Nationalist Tachen Islands in 1955. NBG-1 provided equipment and personnel to assist in a scientific expedition to Danger Island in the South Pacific in conjunction with the International Geophysical Year in 1958. Since 1965, NBG-1 elements participated in many amphibious landings in Vietnam, including landings at Chu Lai, Da Nang, and near the DMZ in the Huế area. Assistance in the withdrawal of US Marine Corps personnel and equipment from Vietnam and their offload in CONUS was provided. In 1975, NBG-1 Units actively participated in the withdrawal and evacuation of Vietnamese citizens.

=== Recent service ===
In recent years, detachments from NBG-1 have participated in the Gulf War and Iraq War in the Persian Gulf, Operation Restore Hope, Operation United Shield, in Somalia. NBG-1 and its component commands engaged in supporting amphibious task force commanders in the THIRD, FIFTH and SEVENTH Fleets during Operation Unified Assistance, the humanitarian/disaster relief efforts after the tsunami that destroyed the Asian Pacific area in 2004, earthquake relief to Pakistan in 2005, wildfire assistance in Southern California, and Operation Tomodachi in Japan. Naval Beach Platoon 1 (NBP-1) deployed to the Second Battle of Ramadi. They also took part in what was known as the "Battle of Al-Fahsa," from March 15 to November 15, 2006.

Today, NBG-1 trains detachments to embark in amphibious ships, as part of an Assault Echelon, as well as deploying as the core of the Naval Support Element during Assault Follow-On Echelon operations. NBG-1 routinely participates in Fleet and Theater exercises (RIMPAC, Foal Eagle, Cobra Gold, CARAT, C/JLOTS, and Talisman Saber) and provides a wide variety of support services at NAB, Coronado. Throughout an illustrious history, from combat operations to humanitarian assistance and disaster relief, NBG-1 has seamlessly operated as the unifying force of Navy and Marine Corps Team, epitomizing the traditional amphibious force motto, "United We Land”, with skill, professionalism, and dedication.

== Awards ==
Naval Beach Group ONE was decorated by President Truman with the Presidential Unit Citation for action with First Marine Division in Korea (Inchon Landing), NBG-1 Western Pacific Detachment earned the Meritorious Unit Commendation for its efforts in Southeast Asia from 1965 to 1969. NBG-1 earned three Navy Unit Commendations (Operation Desert Shield, Desert Storm, Iraqi Freedom) and also earned the National Defense Medal (One Bronze Star), Korean Service Medal, Armed Forces Expeditionary Medal (three Bronze Stars), Vietnam Service Medal, Southwest Asia Service Medal (two Bronze Stars), Global War on Terrorism Expeditionary Medal, Global War on Terrorism Service Medal, Humanitarian Service Medal, United Nations Service Medal, and the Kuwaiti Liberation Medal (Saudi Arabia).

== Notable former and current members ==
- Jesse Iwuji

== Notes ==
Citations

== Bibliography ==
Online resources

- "COMNAVBEACHGRU ONE". US Navy. Archived from the original on June 8, 2015. This article incorporates text from this source, which is in the public domain.
