= LARC-XV =

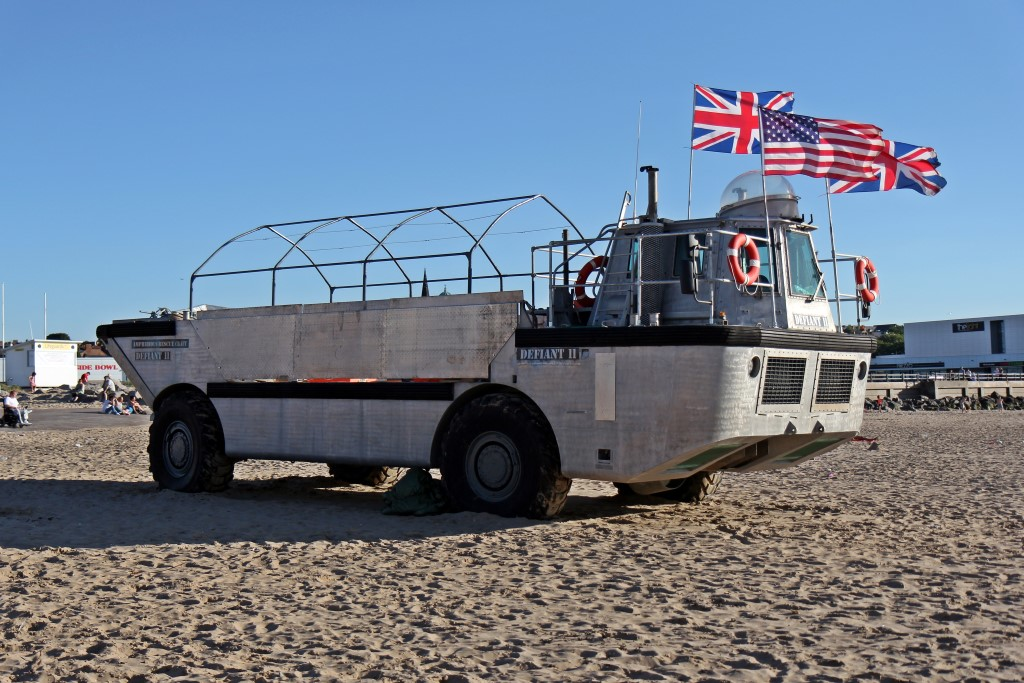
- A LARC-XV at New Brighton, Merseyside
- Type: Amphibious cargo vehicle
- Place of origin: United States

Production history
- Manufacturer: Fruehauf Trailer Corporation Military Vehicle Division
- No. built: about 100

Specifications
- Mass: 33,000 pounds (15,000 kg)
- Length: 45 ft (14 m)
- Width: 15 ft (5 m)
- Height: 16 ft (5 m)
- Engine: 2 × Cummins V8-300; Diesel V8; 2 × 300 hp (220 kW)
- Maximum speed: Land: 30 mph (48 km/h); Water: 9.5 kn (17.6 km/h)

LARC-XV (Lighter, Amphibious Resupply, Cargo, 15 ton), introduced in 1960, is an aluminium hulled amphibious cargo vehicle. It measures 45 by 15 feet and is powered by 2-300 hp engines.

About 100 were made with a small batch sent to Germany.

== See also ==
- LARC-V
- LARC-LX
