= LARC-V =

Amphibious cargo vehicle

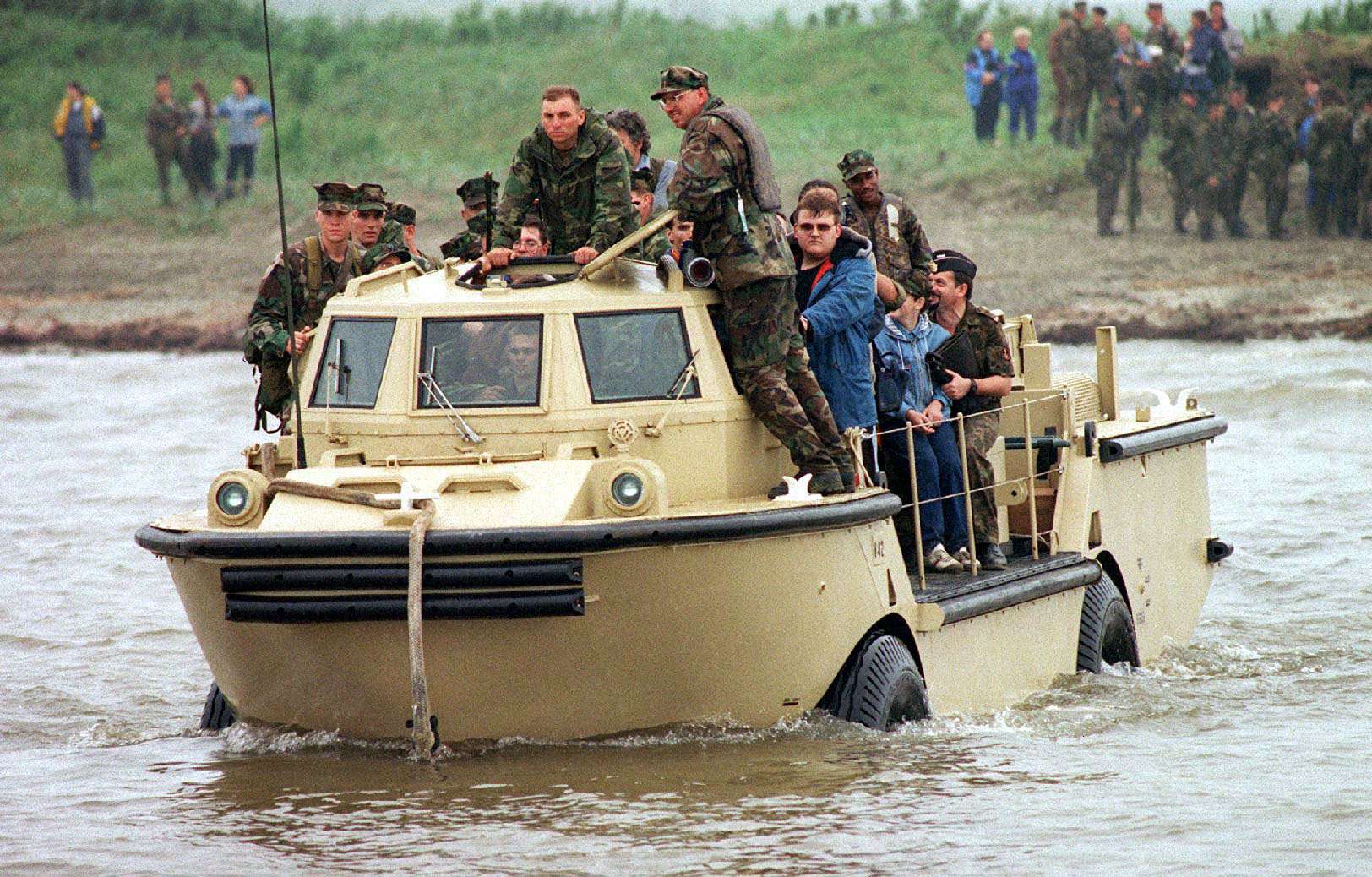
- A LARC-V vehicle
- Type: Amphibious cargo vehicle
- Place of origin: United States

Production history
- Manufacturer: Condec, LeTourneau-Westinghouse

Specifications
- Mass: 19,000 lb (8,618 kg)
- Length: 420 in (11 m)
- Width: 120 in (3 m)
- Height: 122 in (3 m)
- Engine: Cummins V8-300; 785 cu in (12.9 L) Diesel V8; 300 hp (220 kW)
- Suspension: wheel 4x4
- Operational range: 250 mi (402.3 km)
- Maximum speed: Land:30 mph (48 km/h); Water:9.5 mph (15.3 km/h)

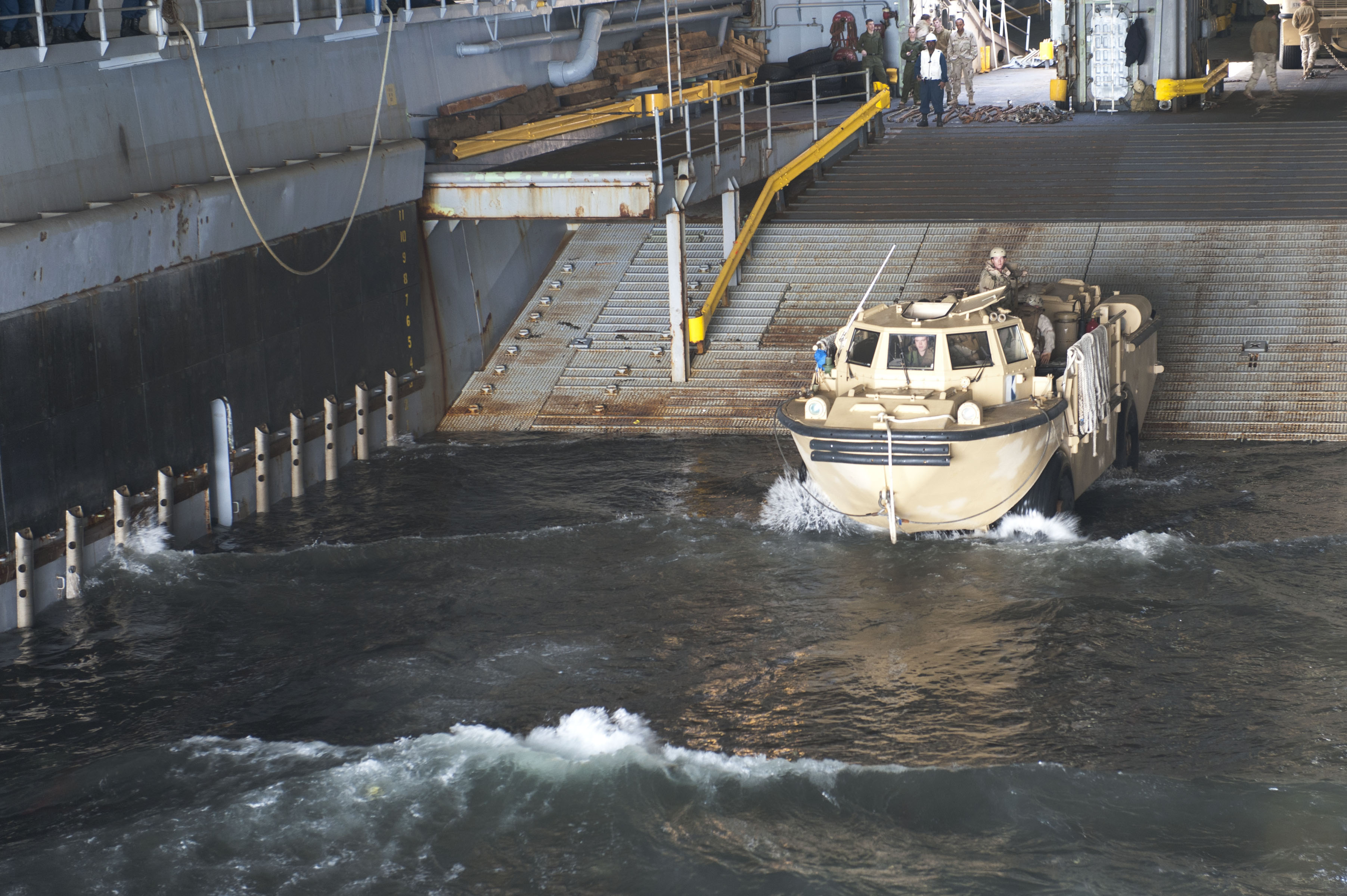
A LARC departs the welldeck of the landing ship USS Pearl Harbor (LSD 52). Embarked Marines from 11th Marine Expeditionary Unit (11th MEU)

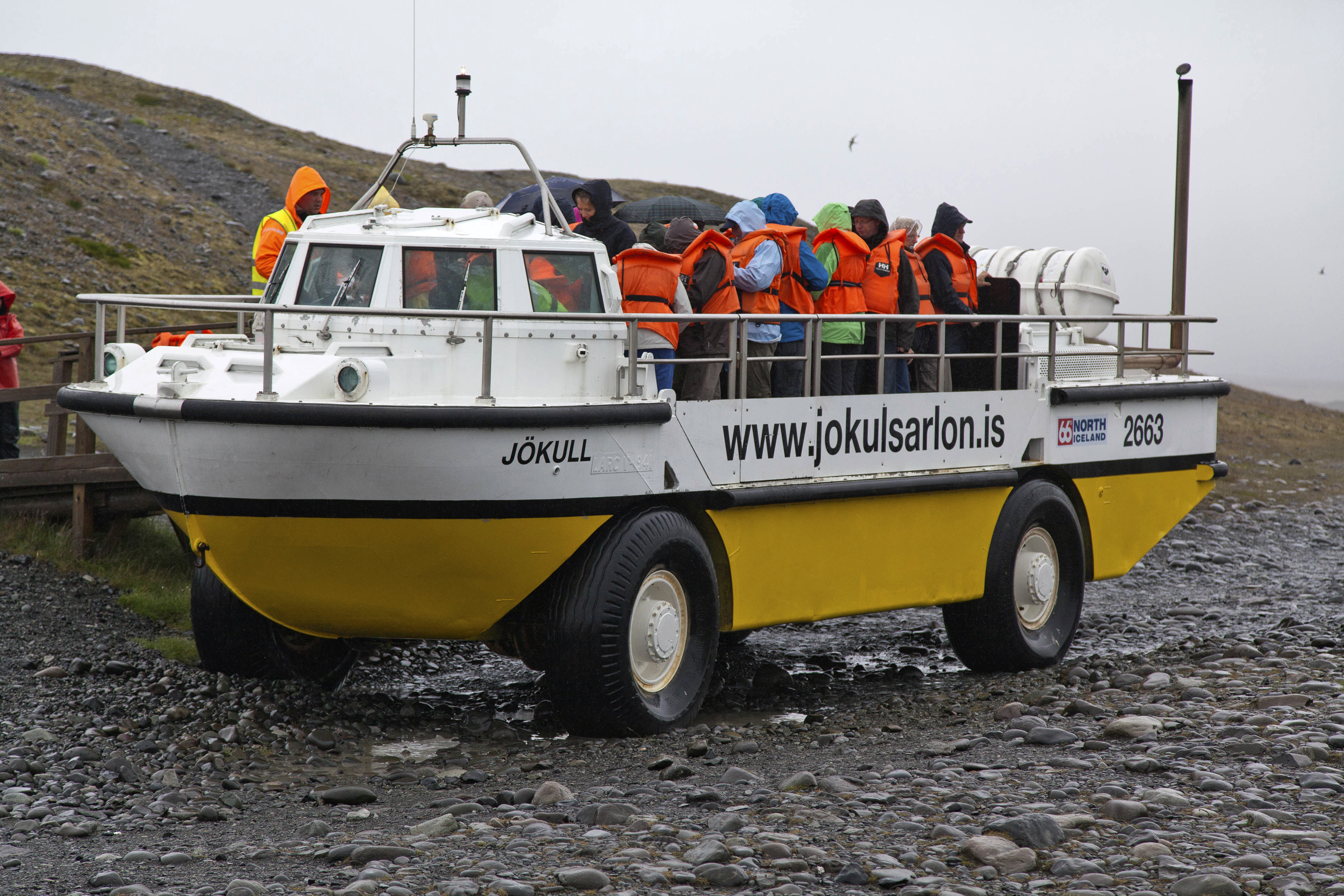
LARC V vehicle in use for tourist trips on Iceland – Jokulsarlon icelake

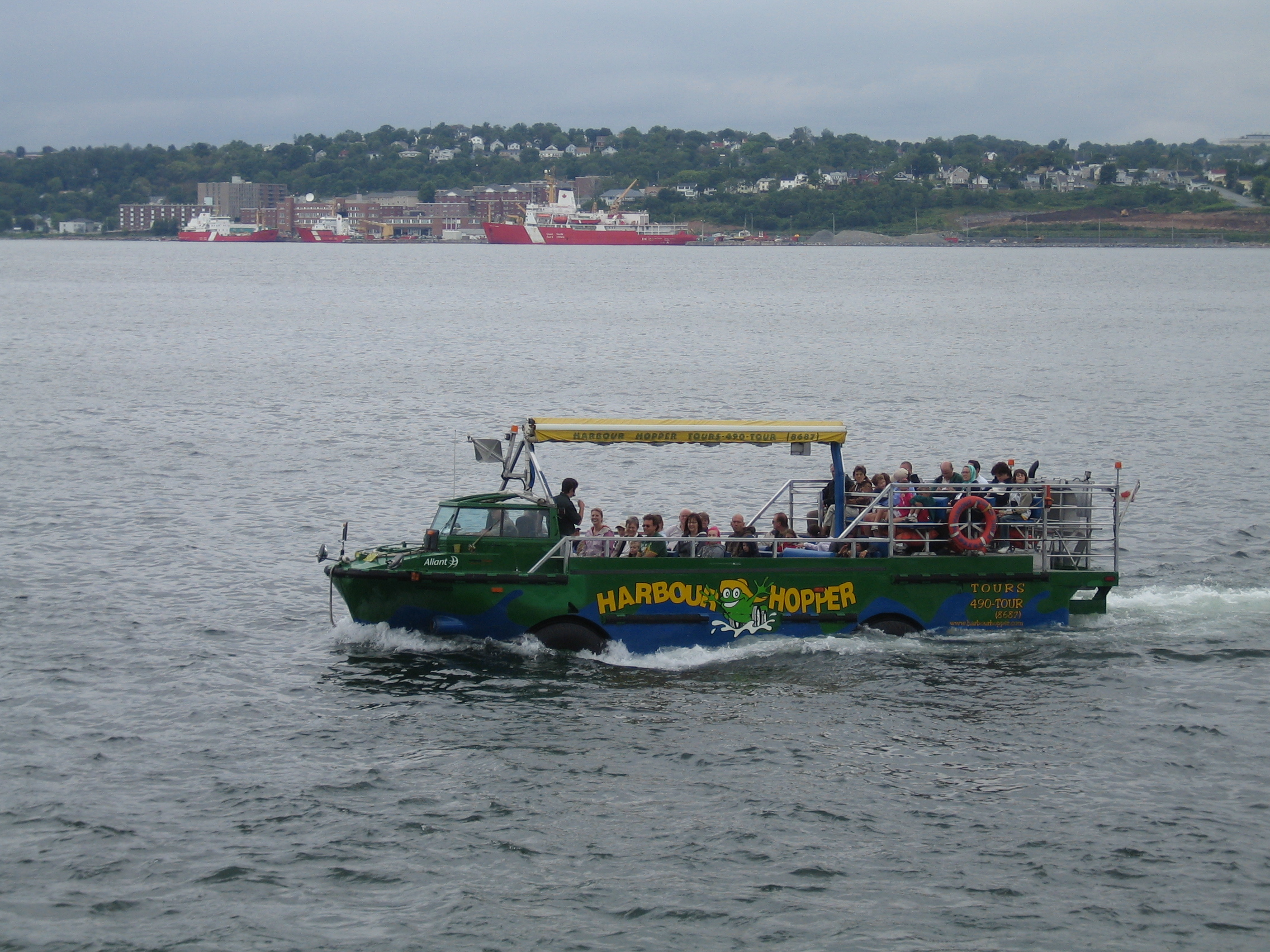
LARC-V converted for harbour tours in Halifax, Nova Scotia

LARC-V (Lighter, Amphibious Resupply, Cargo, 5 (V) ton), is an aluminium-hulled amphibious cargo vehicle capable of transporting 5 tons. It was developed in the United States during the 1950s, and is used in a variety of auxiliary roles to this day.

In addition to the United States, LARC-Vs have been used by military forces in Australia, Argentina, Portugal, the Philippines, Singapore and Iceland. Approximately 968 were made. About 500 were destroyed, most by scuttling during the American withdrawal from South Vietnam. About 200 have been retained in U.S. military service. Roughly 100 are privately owned and mostly used for tourism.

== Operational history ==
The LARC-V was fielded in 1963 and were used extensively by the U.S. Army for over the beach supply during the Vietnam War. They supported the logistical and manpower build up at the start of and during the Vietnam war. Two units arrived from Ft. Story, VA. in June 1965. The 344th Transportation Company (Light Amphibious) setup harbor operations in Qui Nhon and the 347th Transportation Company in Cam Ranh Bay. The companies had two platoons of 17 LARCVs each and a separate 3rd echelon maintenance detachment. About December 1965, one of the 344th's platoons moved to Da Nang and was attached to the Air Force wing. There it ran 24-hour/day operations hauling bombs from ships in the harbor to the flight line. Their operation was so crucial to the USAF that if at least 15 LARCS were not operational, any needed parts were flown in by Nonoperational Ready Supply Grounded (NORSG) aircraft from St Louis. 458th Transportation, LARC-V Company, arrived in Cam Ranh Bay Oct 1967. 101st Airborne Division in 1967 and later the 1st Cavalry Division in 1968.

LARC-Vs were used by the Argentine Marines during the 1982 invasion of the Falkland Islands.

In January 2011, during the 2010–11 Queensland floods in Australia, it was reported that C-17 aircraft of the Royal Australian Air Force were to carry two LARC-V vehicles for use in Operation Flood Assist. The vehicles were deployed from Townsville to RAAF Base Amberley.

== U.S. Navy service life extension program ==
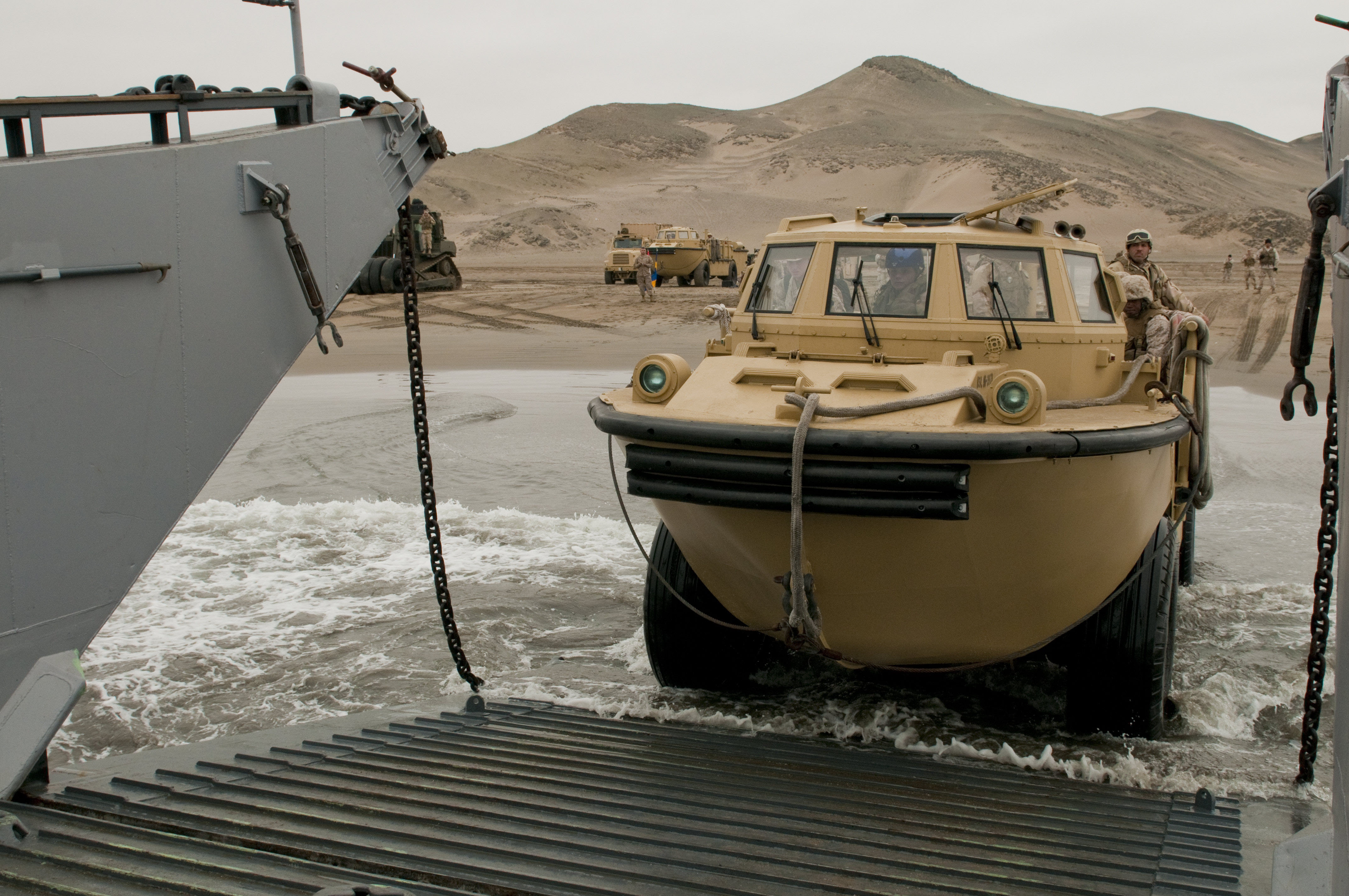
Light amphibious resupply cargo vehicle (LARC-V) from Beachmaster Unit One

The United States Naval Facilities Engineering Command has directed the Sealift Support Program Office to supervise a Service Life Extension Program on the LARC Vs used by the Navy. This SLEP involved changing from a mechanical to a hydraulic transmission, updating the electrical system, and improving other on-board systems. These reworked LARCs began delivery in June 2006 for use by U.S. Navy Beach Master Units, Underwater Construction Teams and the Maritime Prepositioned Force ships. A total of 42 LARCs are currently funded to transition through the SLEP process.

Towing capacity on land was improved to approximately 29,000 lb and bollard pull in water was doubled to 7,600 lb. The vehicle operates in all-wheel drive while in land or tow modes. The craft is powered by a 375-horsepower John Deere turbo-charged Diesel engine that is Tier 2 certified. Engine speed is constant, with a hydraulic transmission modifying speed.

Design and manufacture of the SLEP LARC-Vs was carried out by Power Dynamics, LLC of Stennis Space Center, Mississippi.

== Operators ==
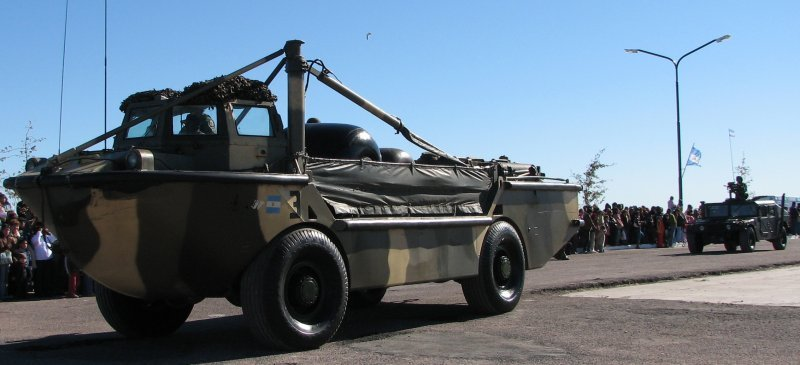
Argentine Marine's LARC-V on Puerto Belgrano Navy Base.

Argentina

- Argentine Marines
- Argentine Army

Australia

- Australian Army
- Australian Antarctic Division (for resupply purposes to the research station on Macquarie Island)

Germany

- German Navy, (amphibious group 1965-1974)

Iceland

- Jökulsárlón

Philippines

- Philippine Marine Corps
- Philippine Red Cross

Portugal

- Portuguese Marine Corps

Singapore

- Singapore Armed Forces
- Singapore Ducktours (those are built in 1973-77 under Singapore Armed Forces from Seletar Camp, withdrawn in 2000 - 2002, converted in batches in 2002 - 2007, de-registering on 2022 - 2026, replaced by 4 electric Seahorse APV amphibious vehicles. From 18 August 2026, the last Condiesel LARC-V under Singapore Ducktours is phased out and replaced by Seahorse APV, also on 10 September 2026, the last Condiesel LARC-V under Funvee City Tours is also phased out and replaced by Seahorse APV, also from 11 September 2026, no more LARC-V are operational in Singapore)

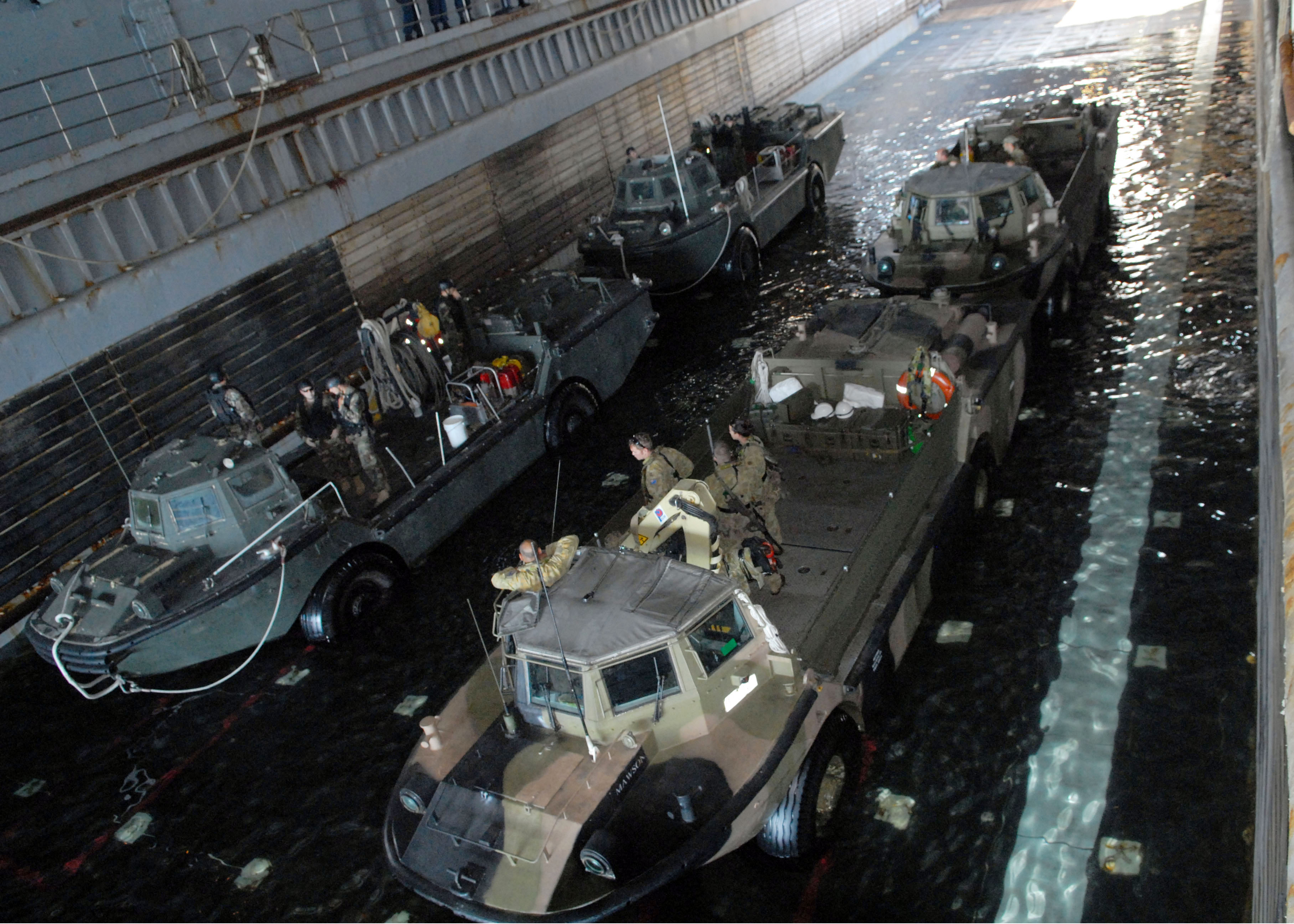
U.S. and Australian LARCs in an amphibious dock.

United States

- United States Navy
  - Beachmaster Unit One
  - Beachmaster Unit Two
  - Naval Beach Unit Seven
- United States Army Corps of Engineers

== Specifications ==
- Land speed: 29 mph
- Water speed: 7.2 knots
- Capacity: 3 crew + 20 passengers (up to 10,000 lbs.)
- Maximum gradient: 60%
- Fuel capacity: 144 gallons diesel total (2 tanks)
- Unloaded land range: 280 to 335 miles
- Unloaded sea range: 110 miles

== See also ==
- DUKW
- Duck tour
- LARC-XV
- LARC-LX (BARC)
- Alvis Stalwart
