= LARC-LX =

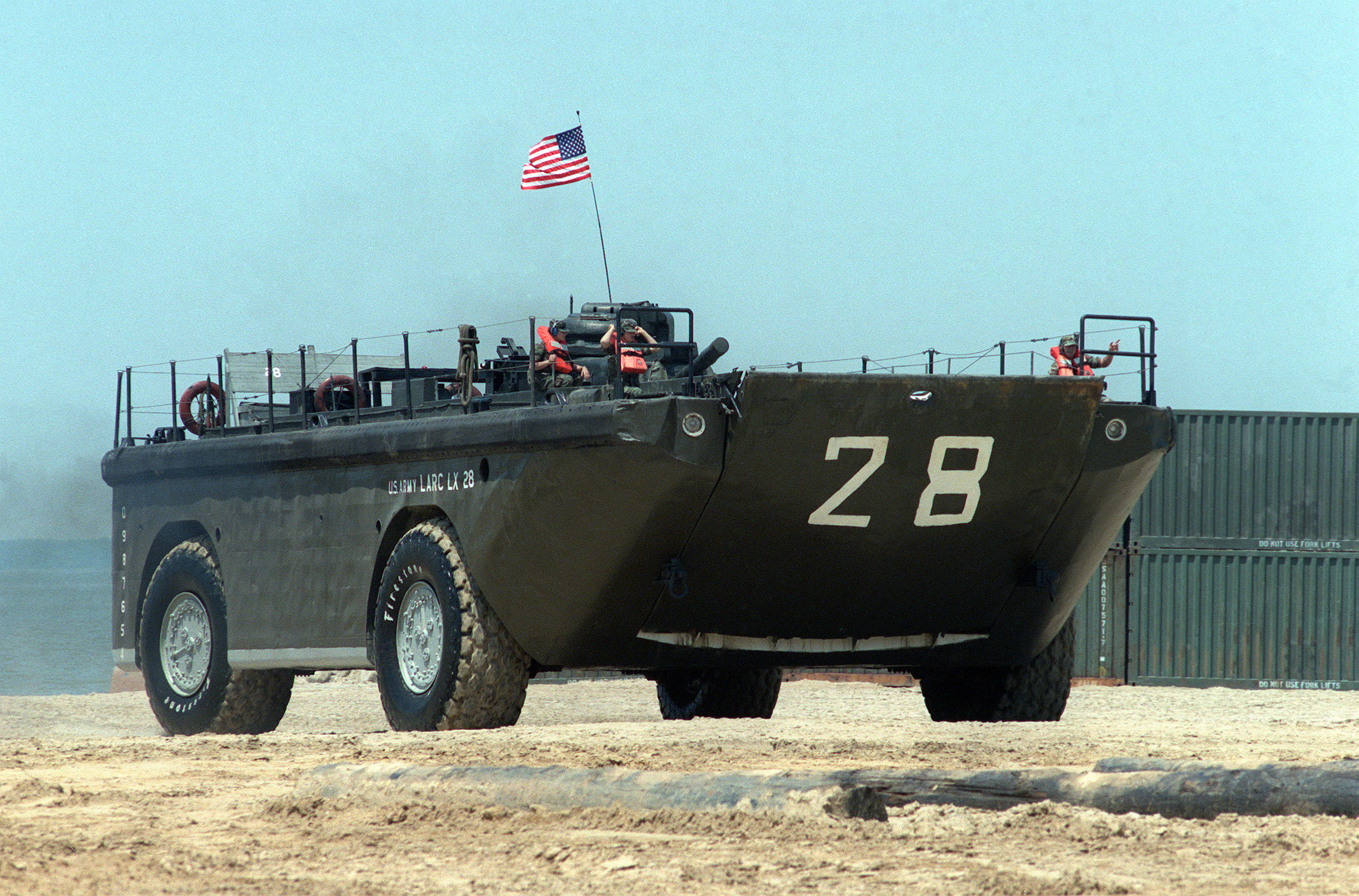
- The LARC-LX
- Type: Amphibious cargo vehicle
- Place of origin: United States

Service history
- In service: 1952–2001
- Used by: United States Army
- Wars: Vietnam War

Production history
- Manufacturer: LeTourneau Technologies

Specifications
- Mass: 194,000 lb (87,996.9 kg) empty
- Length: 62.5 ft (19.1 m)
- Width: 26.5 ft (8.1 m)
- Height: 19 ft (5.8 m)
- Crew: 5
- Passengers: 200
- Engine: Four GMC/Detroit Diesel NA6-71 diesel engines 265 hp (198 kW)
- Payload capacity: 100 t (98.4 long tons; 110.2 short tons) maximum
- Transmission: 3-speed automatic
- Fuel capacity: 600 US gal (2,271.2 L)
- Operational range: 150 mi (240 km)
- Maximum speed: 16 mph (26 km/h) on land 7 knots (13 km/h; 8 mph) on water

The LARC-LX (Lighter, Amphibious Resupply, Cargo, 60 ton), originally designated as BARC (Barge, Amphibious Resupply, Cargo) is a welded steel-hulled amphibious cargo vehicle.

== Description ==
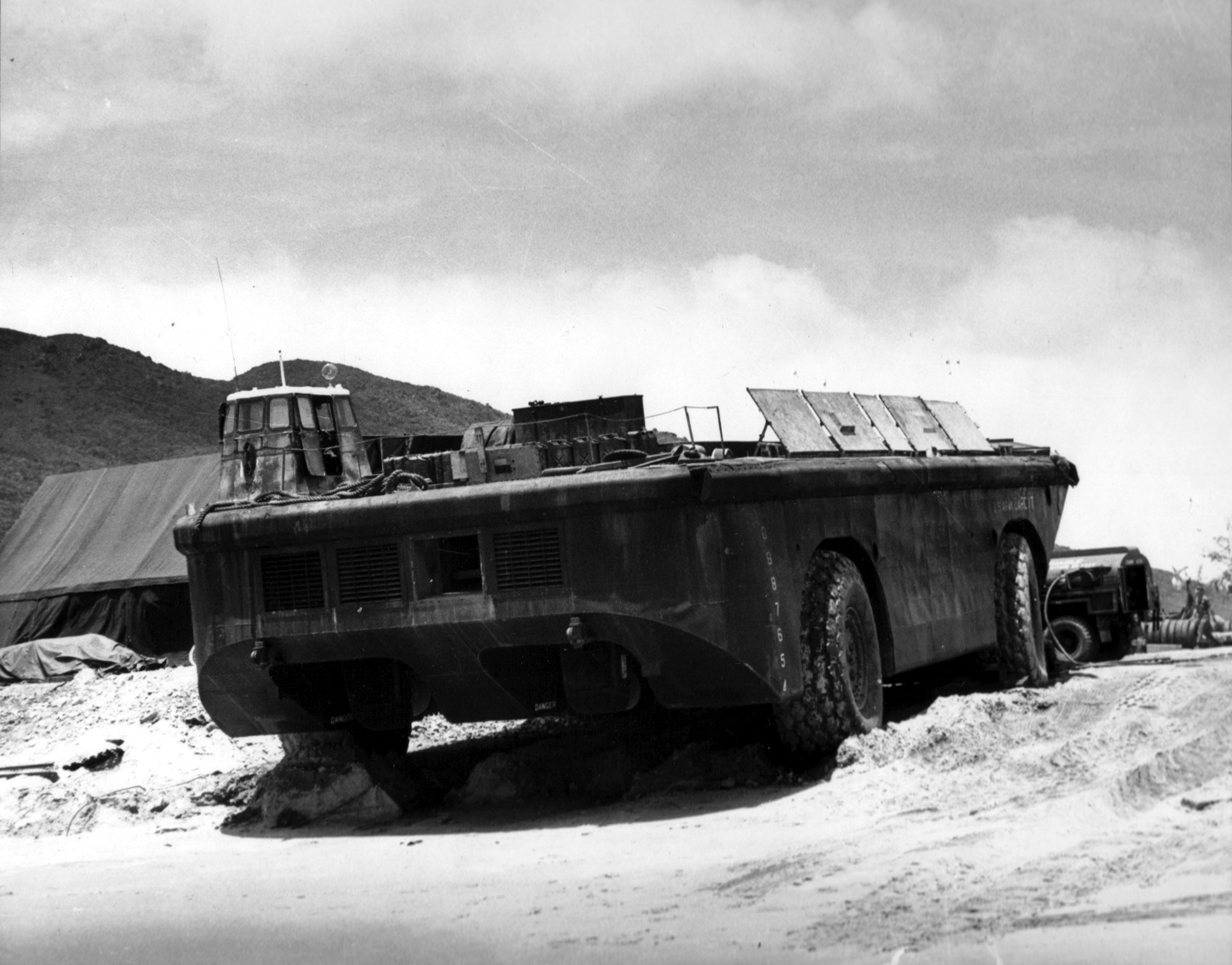
The heaviest of the series, the BARC, in Vietnam.

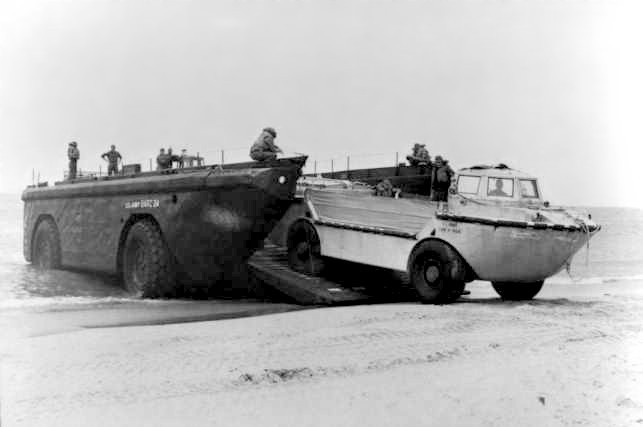
LARC-LX unloading a smaller, aluminium-hulled LARC-V

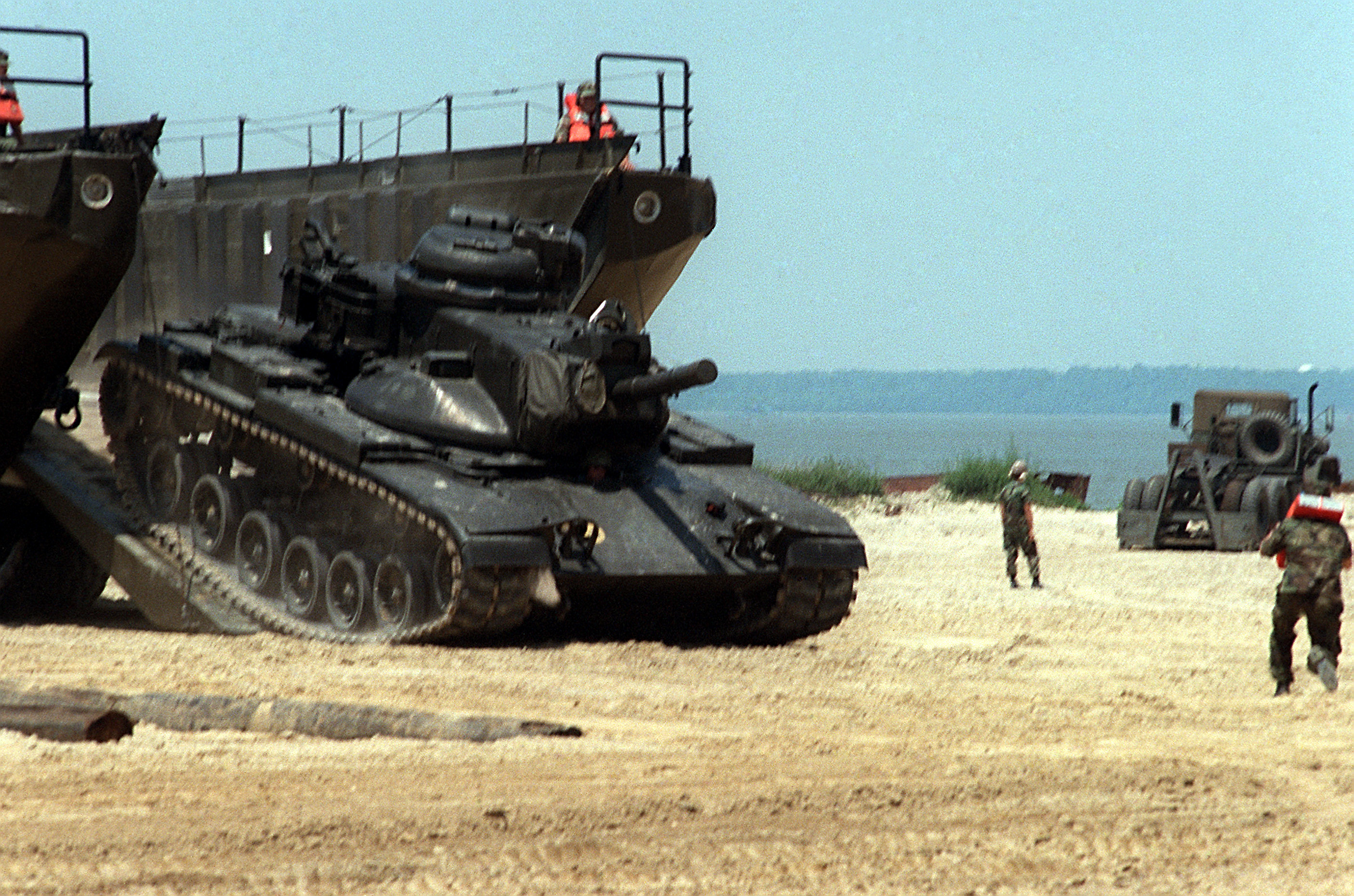
An M60A2 tank is driven off LARC 60 amphibious cargo vessel during Army exposition PROLOG 1985.

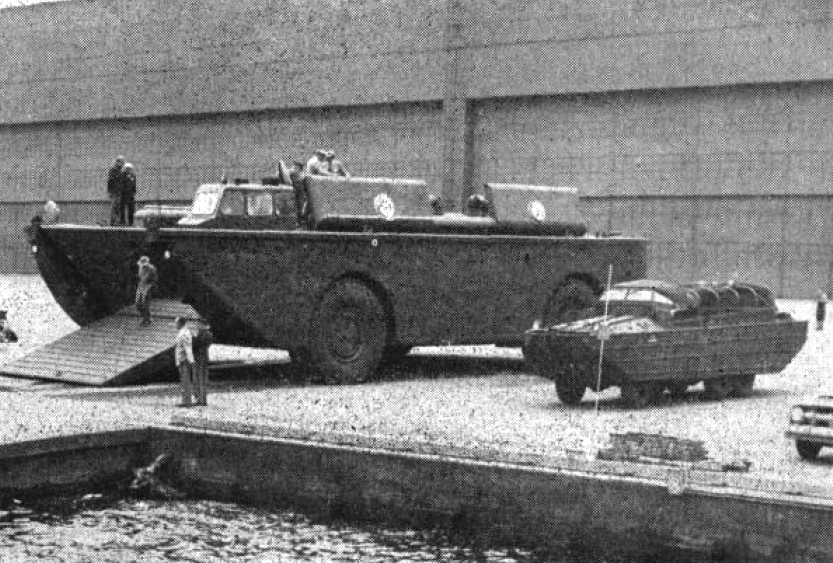
Size comparison to a DUKW

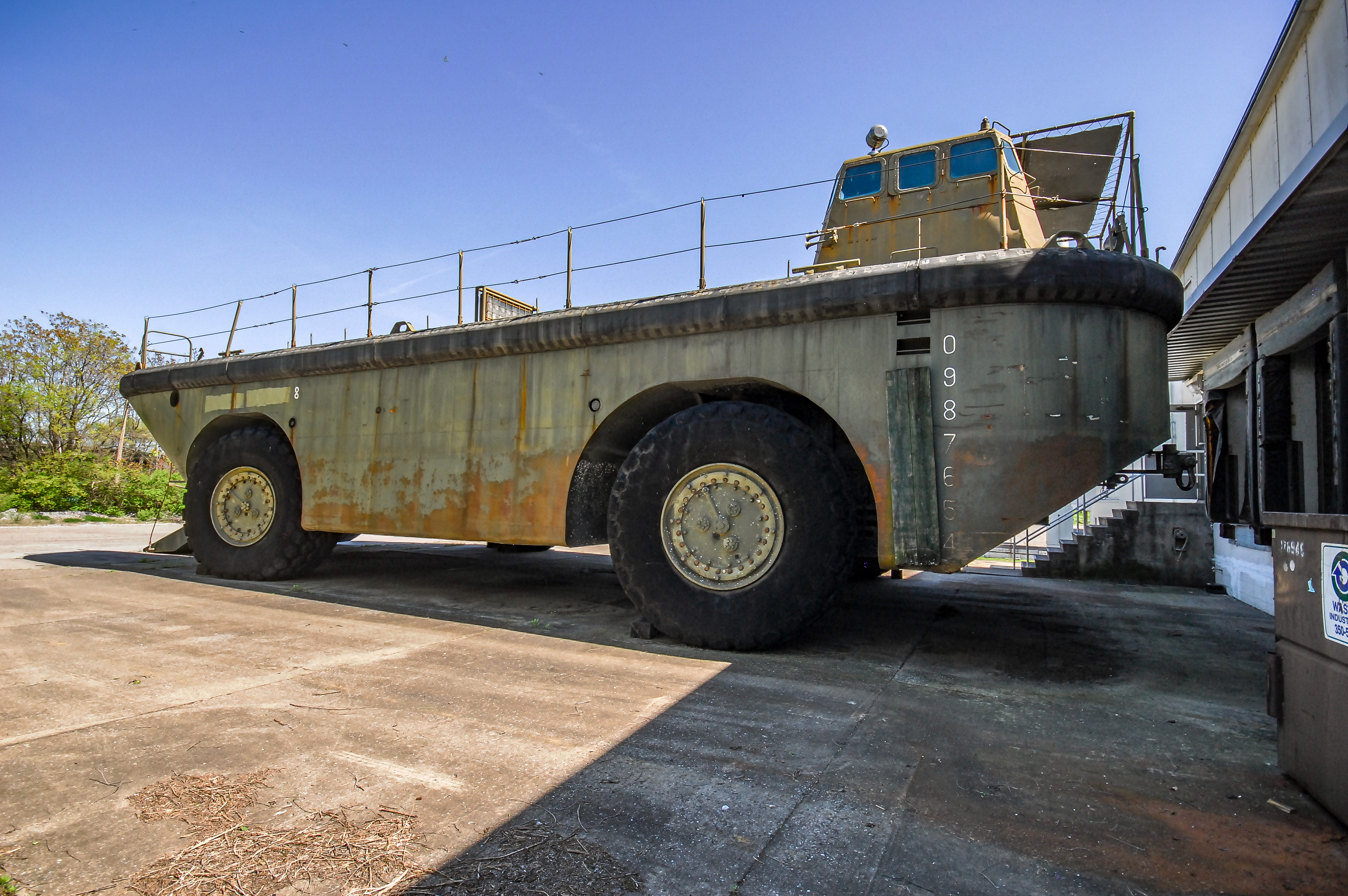
View of the port side of the LARC-LX at the Lane Motor Museum in Nashville, Tennessee

The LARC-LX could carry up to 100 tons of cargo or 200 people, but a more typical load was 60 tons of cargo or 120 people. The vehicle was powered by four 265 hp (198 kW) GMC diesel engines positioned in the sides of the hull, each of which drove one wheel on land. Pairs of engines were coupled to drive each of the two 1.2 m (47 in)-diameter propellers, which propelled the vehicle in the water. Its top speed was 20 mph (32 km/h) on land, or 7.5 mph (12.1 km/h) afloat. The operator occupied a small cab on the port side at the aft end of the vehicle.

The LARC-LX was used to transport wheeled and tracked vehicles, including beach preparation equipment and general cargo, from ship-to-shore or to inland transfer points. It was also capable of transporting 40 ft (12 m) shipping containers, which could be landed from the LARC either by crane, straddle carriers, or rollers. It was the only amphibious vehicle in U.S. Army service capable of landing on a beach through surf. Typically, the LARC-LX was carried as deck cargo on a commercial vessel or heavy lift ship to be transported overseas. Surviving examples of the LARC-LX can be found at the Overloon War Museum in the Netherlands, the Military Museum of North Florida in Green Cove Springs, Florida, the Lane Motor Museum in Nashville, Tennessee, and the US Army Transportation Museum at Ft. Eustis, VA. There are also 2 in operational condition in Tappohannock Va #48 & #49 “Wild Sally” and “Big Jack”. Family business Tidewater Subsea will use the LARCs to dredge area creeks.

== Service ==
The first BARC had its maiden voyage in 1952 at Fort Lawton, Washington. The designation was changed from BARC to LARC in 1960. The LARCs first saw active service in 1967 when they were dispatched to South Vietnam to support the 101st Airborne Division, and in 1968 the 1st Cavalry Division. The last LARC-LX vehicles were retired from service in 2001. However, a few remain in civilian service performing specialty roles, including two operating out of Montross and Tappahannock in Virginia.

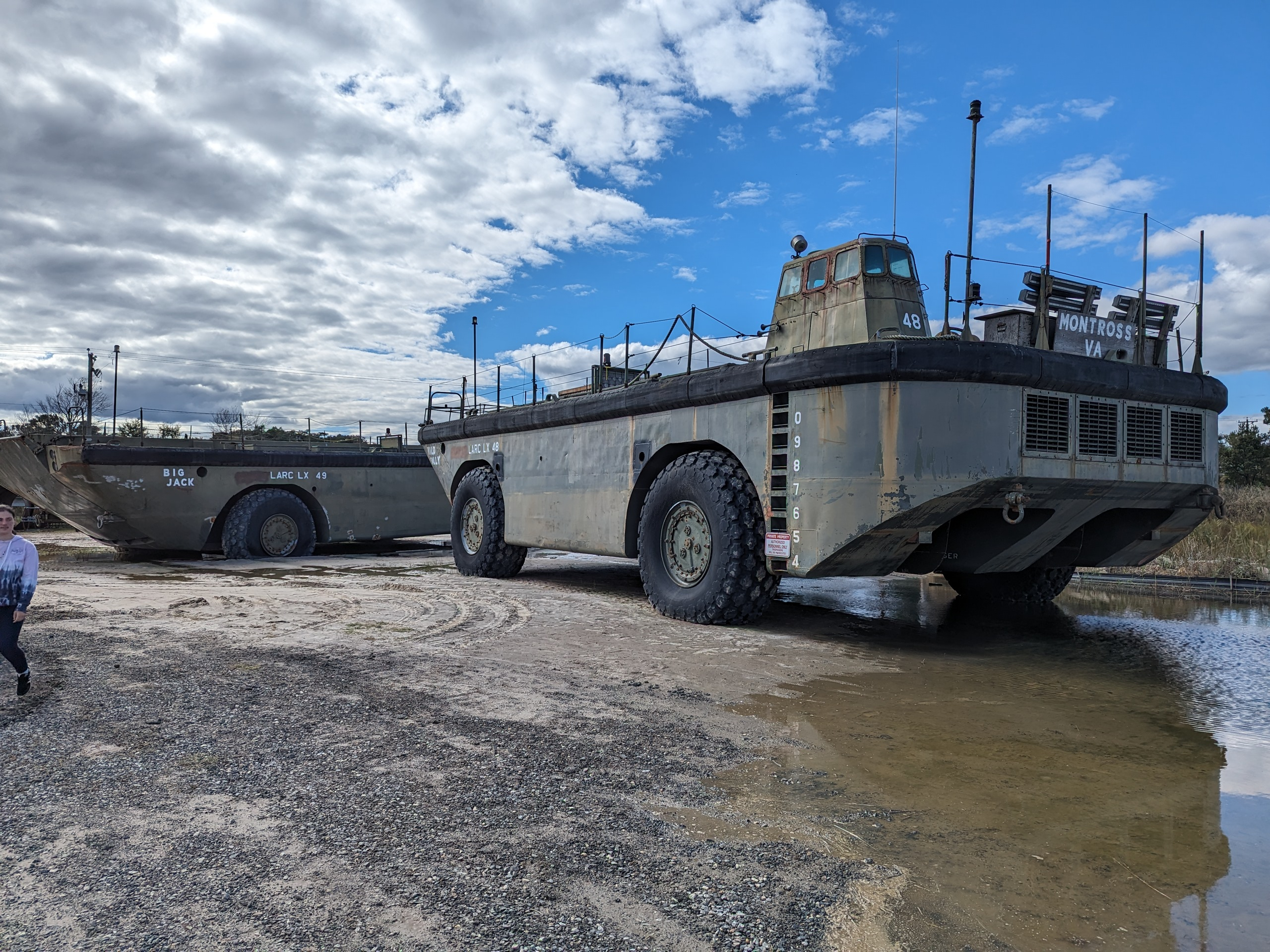
Two LARC LX amphibious vehicles in Tappahannock VA in October 2023

The 79th Transportation Battalion that utilized LARCs was stationed at Fort Story, VA in the late 1960’s and early 1970’s.

== Specifications ==
- Crew: 5
- Weight: 100 tons
- Engine: GM 6-71, 265 hp × 4
- Range (land): 150 miles (240 km)
- Range (sea): 75 miles (121 km)
- Length: 62.5 feet (19.1 m)
- Width: 26.5 feet (8.1 m)
- Height: 19 ft, 6in
- Wheelbase: 28 ft, 6 in
- Battery: 24 volt
- Speed (water)
  - Forward (empty): 7.5 mph (12.1 km/h)
  - Forward (60 ton): 7 mph (11 km/h)
  - Forward (100 ton): 6.5 mph (10.5 km/h)
- Speed (land)
  - Forward (empty): 15.2 mph (24.5 km/h)
  - Forward (60 ton): 14 mph (23 km/h)
  - Forward (100 ton): 12.75 mph (20.52 km/h)
  - Reverse (60 ton): 2.85 mph (4.59 km/h)
- Turning circle: 75 ft (23 m)
- Gradient: 60%
- Temperature range: 125 F to -25 F (-30 to +50 °C)

== See also ==
- LARC-V – Lighter, Amphibious Resupply, Cargo, 5 ton – an aluminium-hulled vehicle.
- LARC-XV – Lighter, Amphibious Resupply, Cargo, 15 ton – an aluminium-hulled amphibious cargo vehicle.
