= USS Pearl Harbor =

Harpers Ferry-class dock landing ship

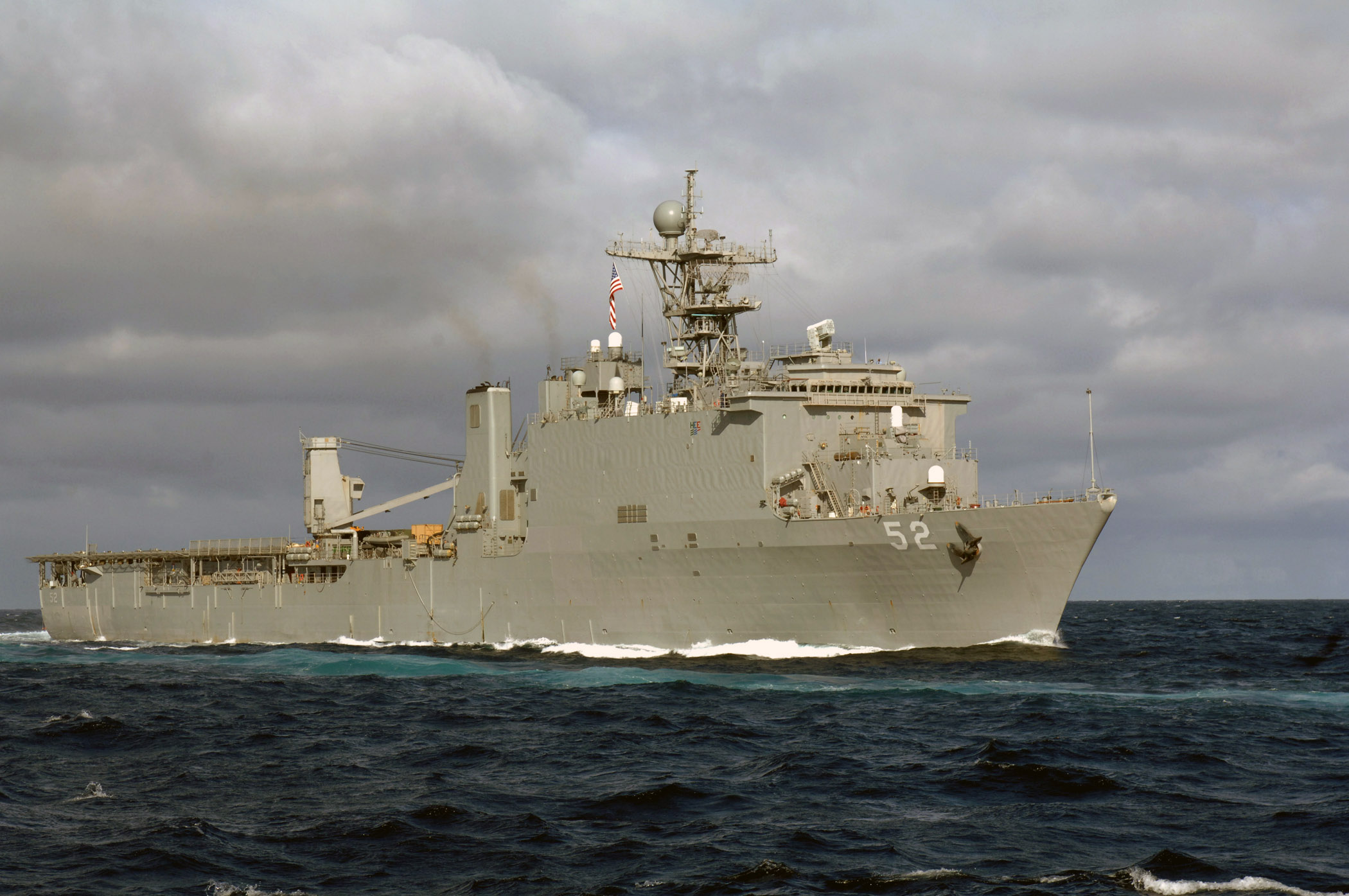
- USS Pearl Harbor (LSD 52) in the Pacific Ocean (20 June 2007).

History

United States
- Name: USS Pearl Harbor
- Namesake: Pearl Harbor
- Ordered: 12 October 1993
- Builder: Avondale Shipyards
- Laid down: 27 January 1995
- Launched: 24 February 1996
- Commissioned: 30 May 1998
- Home port: Naval Base San Diego
- Motto: Nation's Battle Cry
- Nickname(s): Black Pearl
- Status: in active service
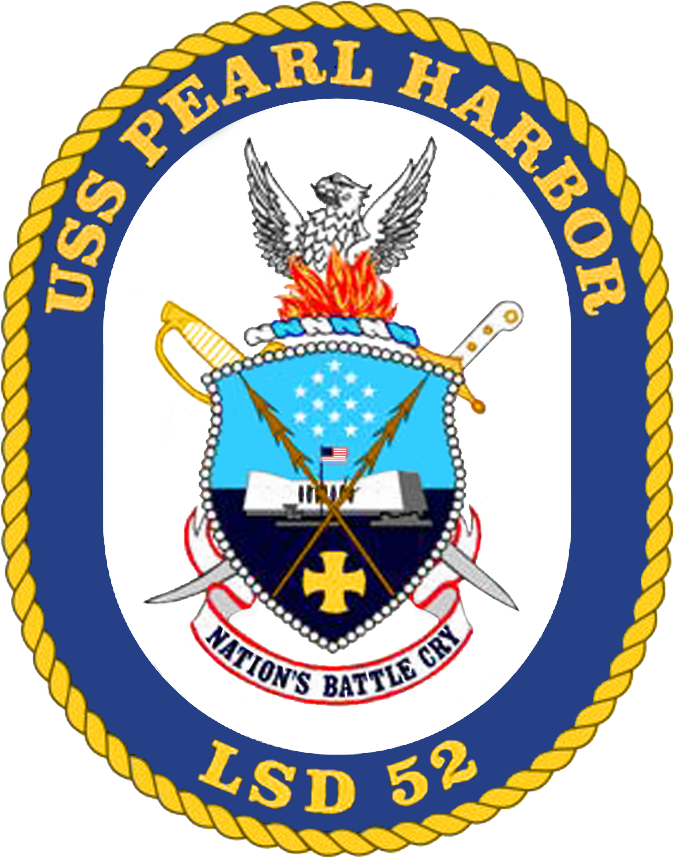
- Badge

General characteristics
- Class & type: Harpers Ferry-class dock landing ship
- Displacement: 11,251 tons (light); 16,088 tons (full)
- Length: 610 ft (190 m)
- Beam: 84 ft (26 m)
- Draft: 21 ft (6.4 m)
- Propulsion: 4 Colt Industries, 16-cylinder diesel engines, 2 shafts, 33,000 shp (25 MW)
- Speed: 20+ knots (37+ km/h)
- Boats & landing craft carried: 2 LCACs or 1 LCU or four LCM-8 or nine LCM-6
- Capacity: 15 Amphibious Assault Vehicles (AAV), 2 M1 Abrams tanks
- Complement: 24 officers, 397 enlisted; Marine detachment: 402 + 102 surge
- Sensors & processing systems: AN/SPS-67; AN/SPS-73; AN/SPS-49
- Electronic warfare & decoys: SLQ-32(V1); Nulka
- Armament: 2 × 25 mm Mk 38 cannons; 2 × 20 mm Phalanx CIWS mounts; 2 × Rolling Airframe Missile launchers; 6 × .50 caliber M2HB machine gun

USS Pearl Harbor (LSD 52) is a Harpers Ferry-class dock landing ship of the United States Navy. She was named for Pearl Harbor, where World War II began for the United States.

Pearl Harbor was laid down on 27 January 1995, by the Avondale Shipyards, New Orleans, La.; launched on 24 February 1996; and commissioned on 30 May 1998.

As of 6 September 2018, Pearl Harbor is homeported to NS San Diego, California, and assigned to Commander Amphibious Squadron 1 (COMPHIBRON 1).

== Overview ==
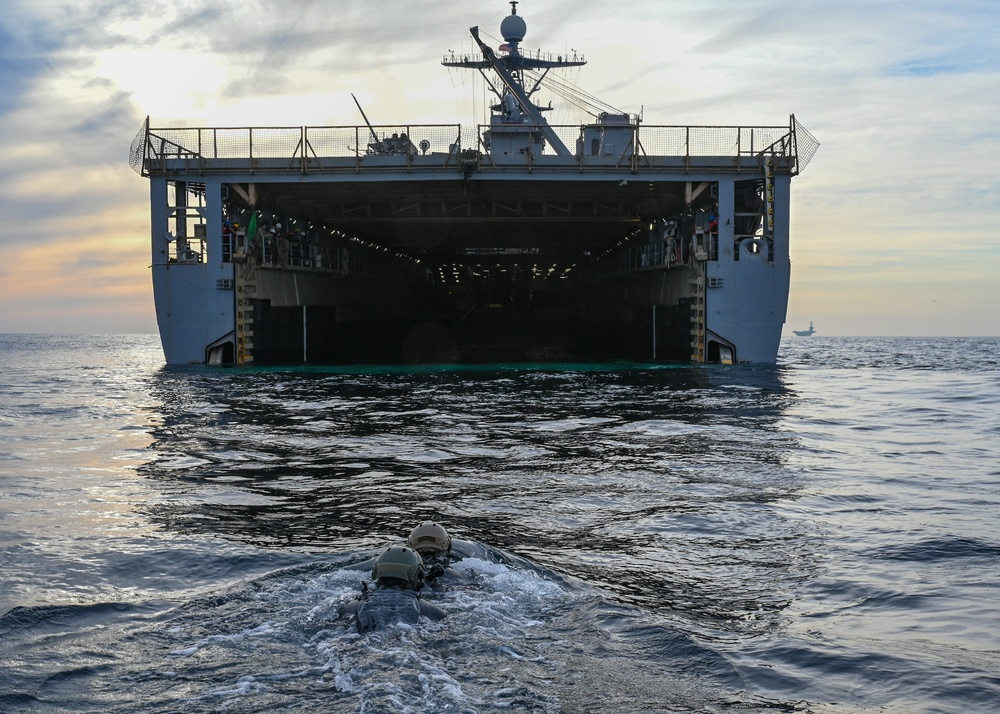
Navy SEAL divers assigned to Naval Special Warfare Group 1 approach amphibious dock landing ship USS Pearl Harbor (LSD 52) during well deck dive training. (Dec. 3, 2022)

The mission of the Landing Ship Dock (LSD) is to transport and launch amphibious craft, vehicles, crews and embarked personnel in an amphibious assault. An LSD can also render limited docking and repair service to small ships and craft, and act as the Primary Control Ship (PCS) during amphibious assaults. The well deck can hold two Landing Craft Air Cushions (LCAC) and a variety of landing craft and tracked amphibious assault vehicles. This provides Marines with added vehicle and cargo storage areas.

== Service history ==
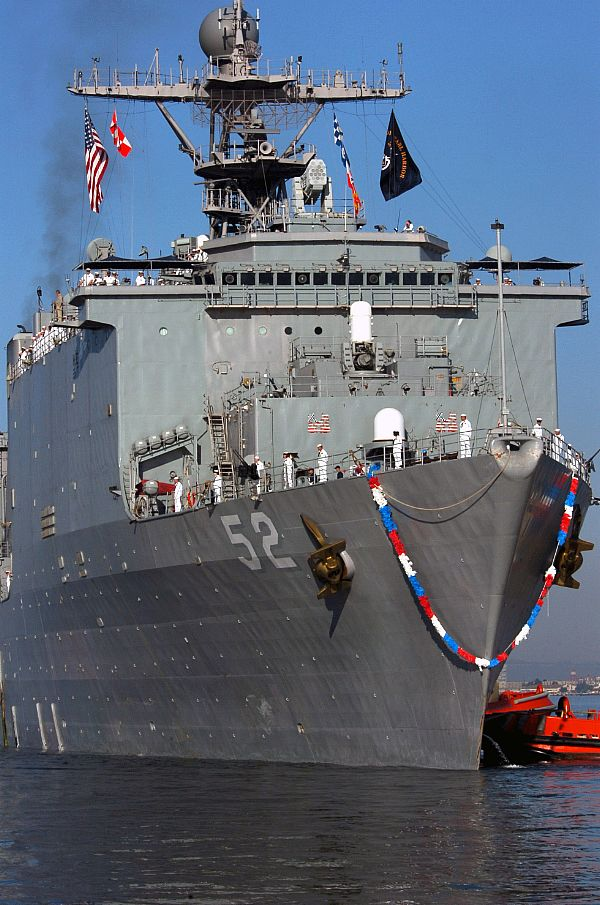
Close up look of USS Pearl Harbor (LSD-52)

On 4 May 2008, the ship departed San Diego for assignment in the Persian Gulf as part of the Peleliu amphibious assault group. On 21 July 2008, Pearl Harbor was run aground on a shoal off of Kuwait without damage. Following the incident, Commander Xavier F. Valverde was relieved of command by Rear Admiral Kendall Card, commander of Expeditionary Strike Group 3, and reassigned to shore staff duty in Bahrain. Captain Mike Slotsky, deputy commodore of Destroyer Squadron 9 in Everett, Washington, was assigned to oversee the ship temporarily.

On 20 May 2010, the ship departed on a Western Pacific (WESTPAC) deployment as a part of the Peleliu Amphibious Readiness Group, where she participated in relief efforts following devastating floods in Pakistan in September 2010. Following her aid to Pakistani victims, she sailed south to Somalia where she conducted counter-piracy operations and lent aid to over 60 Somali refugees for over a month. She returned to her homeport of San Diego, California on 17 December 2010.

On 14 November 2011, the ship departed on a WESTPAC deployment as part of the Makin Island Amphibious Readiness Group. She returned to San Diego on 22 June 2012.

From May through August 2013, Pearl Harbor deployed independently in support of Pacific Partnership 2013, providing humanitarian aid to the island nations of Samoa, Tonga, New Caledonia, French Polynesia, Marshall Islands, Kiribati, and Solomon Islands.

On 15 April 2014, the ship entered an Extended Docking Phased Maintenance Availability (EDPMA) to complete her midlife overhaul. After numerous extensions due to unplanned growth work, Pearl Harbor completed her extensive overhaul in May 2016. The ship participated in Southern California Rim of the Pacific (RIMPAC) in July 2016 where it supported amphibious operations in conjunction with Australian, Canadian, Japanese, and German coalition partners under command of CDR Judd Krier.

In July 2017, Pearl Harbor departed on WESTPAC 17–2 as a part of the 15th MEU. Their main mission was the supporting of Operation Inherent Resolve. Pearl Harbor decomposited stateside on 7 March 2018.

In August 2021, Pearl Harbor deployed with USS Essex and her amphibious readiness group (ARG), along with the 11th Marine Expeditionary Unit, recon marines from Maritime Special Purpose Force, Beachmaster Unit One and Assault Craft Unit 1. The mission was in support of Operation Freedom's Sentinel and Operation Inherent Resolve for the Withdrawal of United States troops from Afghanistan (2020–2021). The Pearl Harbor participated in theater amphibious combat rehearsals in Kuwait, Bahrain, Pakistan, Djibouti,Somalia and Yemen. While also operating with joint maritime forces of allied countries such as Bahrain, Saudi Arabia, Egypt and Israel. The ARG then headed to the 7th Fleet in January, where the group teamed up with the Carrier Strike Group One in the South China Sea for expeditionary strike force operations.

== Planned decommission ==
The ship was originally planned to be decommissioned, and placed in the Reserve Fleet sometime in 2024. However, the ship's life was extended.
