= Maritime Prepositioning Force Utility Boat =

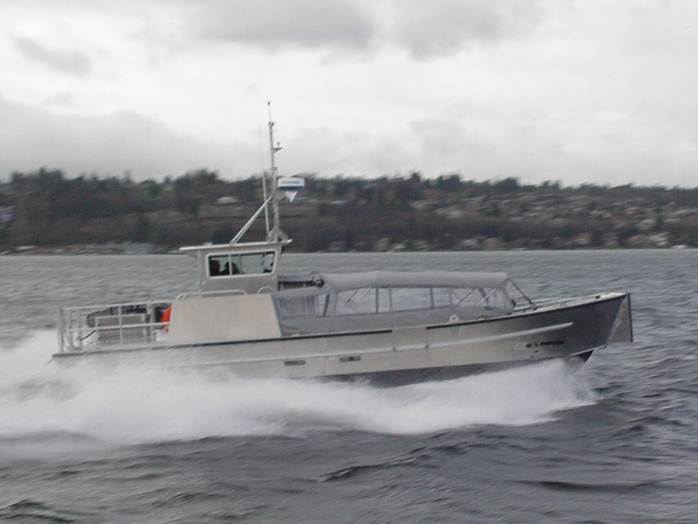
- Side View of an MPFUB underway

Class overview
- Name: MPF/UB-40
- Builders: Kvichak Marine Industries
- Operators: United States Navy
- In service: 2006 to present

General characteristics
- Type: Utility Boat
- Displacement: 20 tons
- Length: 41 ft 0 in (12.50 m)
- Beam: 14 ft 0 in (4.3 m)
- Installed power: 2 × Cummins QSM11 engines, 660 hp (492 kW)
- Propulsion: 2 × Hamilton HJ 364 Waterjets
- Speed: 40 knots (74 km/h) light; 25 knots (46 km/h) loaded
- Capacity: 10 tons
- Troops: 30
- Crew: 5
- Armament: 3 × Crew Served Weapons

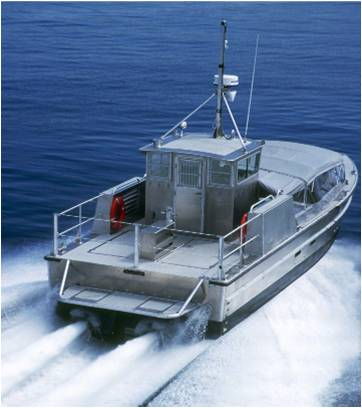
Aft view of an MPFUB underway

The Maritime Prepositioning Force (MPF) Utility Boat (MPFUB) is a commercially designed utility craft used primarily to move personnel and light equipment during MPF offload operations. The 41 foot long, high-speed landing craft are replacing the Navy’s existing LCM-8 craft as part of the United States Navy's Improved Navy Lighterage System (INLS) in support of pre-positioned Marine Amphibious assault missions. Additional missions include supporting waterborne force protection, transportation of personnel and materials, medical evacuation, salvage, damage control, and repair operations.

The MPFUB's power bow ramp facilitates embarking and discharging personnel over an INLS, low pier, or quay. Cargo capacity is ten tons, or up to 30 personnel with 150 lbs of equipment at speeds up to 25 knots fully loaded. It can reach speeds around 40 knots when empty.

The MPFUB weighs about 44,000 pounds (19,950 kg). Propulsion is provided by twin Cummins QSM11 engines rated for 660 hp at 2300 rpm and Hamilton 364 water jets (for beach deployments). The MPFUB has three weapon mounts for M2 Browning, Mk 19 grenade launcher, or M240 machine guns. It was designed by Kvichak Marine Industries, Incorporated.

Procurement of the MPFUB is managed by the Naval Facilities Expeditionary Logistics Center (NFELC). The first MPFUB was delivered to the Navy's Assault Craft Unit ONE in 2006.
