= Naval Beach Unit Seven =

- Active: August 1, 2012 - Present
- Country: United States
- Branch: United States Navy
- Garrison/HQ: United States Fleet Activities Sasebo
- Nickname(s): “Fifth ship of the FDNF ARG”
- Motto(s): "Praecursŏr ǎb Adsulto" "Forerunner of the Assault"
- Mascot(s): Master Chief "Chewy"
- Website: https://www.surfpac.navy.mil/nbu7/

Commanders
- Current commander: CDR F.D. Crayton

Naval Beach Unit Seven, (NBU-7) is a United States Navy amphibious unit based at United States Fleet Activities Sasebo in Sasebo, Japan.

== Mission ==
Naval Beach Unit Seven is a one of a kind Navy command that provides a limited Defensive Combat Operations (DCO) capability in support of Amphibious Operations and Humanitarian Assistance/Disaster Relief efforts (HADR). Using its assigned Landing Craft Air Cushion (LCAC), Landing Craft Utility (LCU) and Beach Party Team (BPT), NBU-7 supports the movement of troops, equipment, vehicles, and supplies from amphibious shipping to beaches around the world.

Naval Beach Unit Seven reports to Naval Beach Group 1.

== History ==
Beachmaster Unit was formed from the Navy Shore Party of World War II. The Shore Party formed the nucleus to which the various land and naval elements were assigned for an operation. The naval elements included the Underwater Demolition Team, a Naval Pontoon Unit, and a Boat Pool. Units called Beach Parties were formed and were composed of members of the ship's crew to ensure the mass movement and orderly flow of troops, equipment and supplies, through the surf zone, onto the hostile shore, and across the assault beaches to achieve the success of the amphibious operations. The original units consisted of approximately two officers and thirty men, to support the landing of the battalion of troops. In July 1948, the Chief of Naval Operations ordered the commissioning of the Beachmaster Unit as a separate command with designation as Beachmaster Unit One. Due to the operational need for a Forward Deployed Naval Force (FDNF) NBG-1 created a Western Pacific Detachment (WESTPAC DET) consisting of LCACs, LCUs, and BPTs all in one geographical location, combining a Beach Master Unit and an Assault Craft Unit for the first time in naval history. This WESTPAC DET was commissioned on August 1, 2012, into Naval Beach Unit Seven(NBU-7) and is no longer associated with BMU-1.

Naval Beach Unit (NBU) 7 and the 1224th Engineering Support Company, Guam Army National Guard worked together to load heavy equipment vehicles onto the amphibious dock landing ship USS Ashland for transport to Saipan in support of disaster relief efforts after Super Typhoon Yutu on November 6, 2018.

In November, 2019 the unit participated in Tiger Triumph, the first-ever tri-service exercise involving the U.S. Navy and Marine Corps and Indian Army, Navy and Air Force.

Naval Beach Unit (NBU) 7 held a change of command ceremony onboard Commander, Fleet Activities Sasebo where Commander Greta Densham was relieved by Commander Kirk Sowers, Dec. 12 2019.

== Awards ==
Naval Beach Unit (NBU) 7 was announced as the fiscal year 2017 Secretary of the Navy (SECNAV) Safety Excellence Award recipient for the expeditionary unit category on October 23.

== Bi-lateral partners ==
Australia
India
Japan
Malaysia
Philippines
Singapore
South Korea
Thailand
