= Hull maintenance technician =

US Navy occupational rating

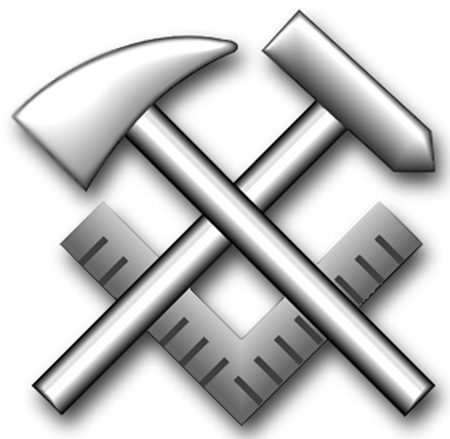
- Rating insignia
- Issued by: United States Navy
- Type: Enlisted rating
- Abbreviation: HT
- Specialty: Metal working, welding, fabrication, shipboard firefighting

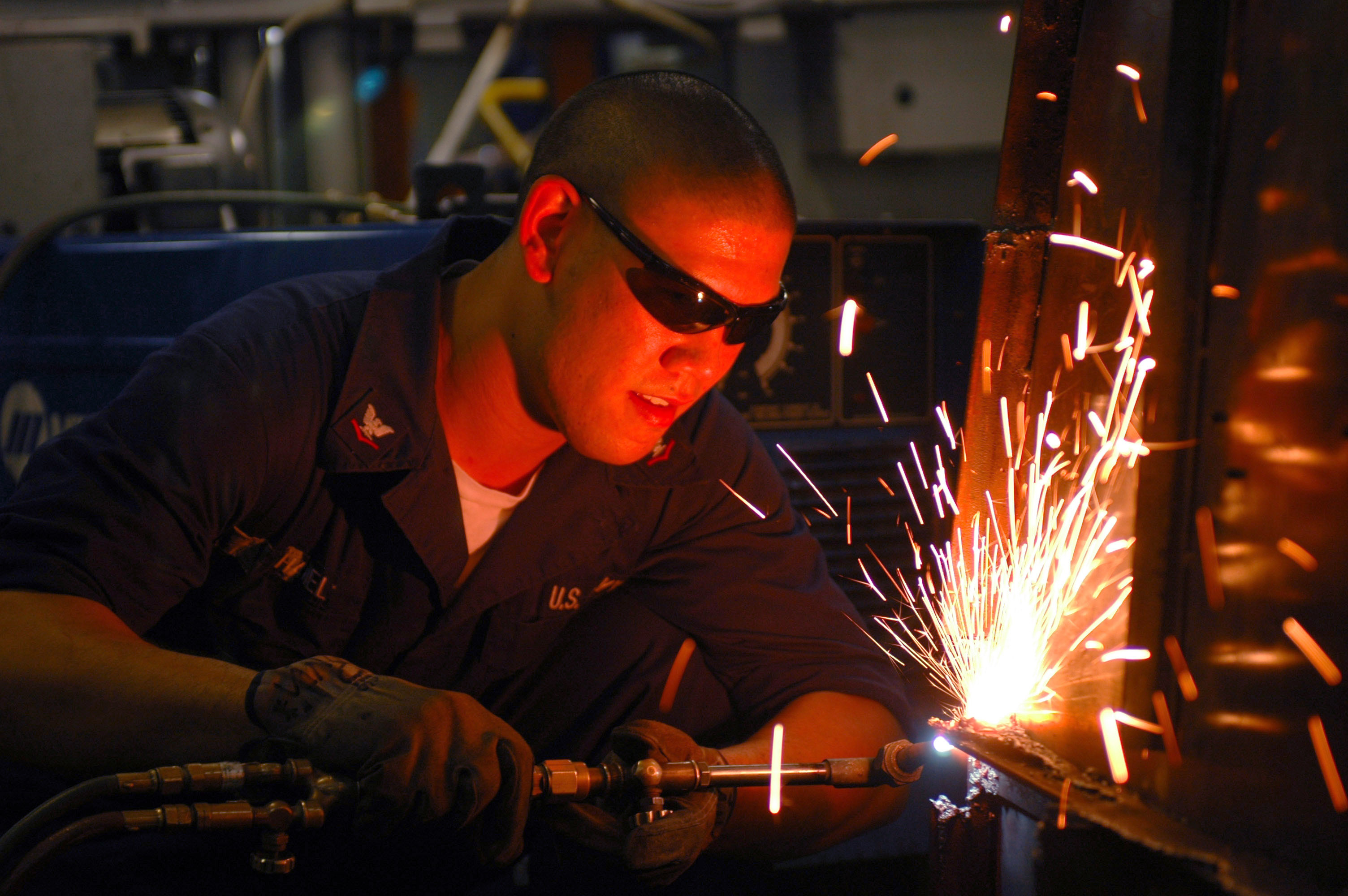
A hull maintenance technician using a cutting torch aboard the USS Nimitz

Hull maintenance technician (abbreviated as HT) is a United States Navy occupational rating.

Hull maintenance technicians plan, supervise, and perform tasks necessary for fabrication, installation and repair of all types of shipboard structures, plumbing, sheet metal fabrication, carpentry and piping systems; organize, supervise, and train personnel in maintenance and hull and mechanical repair; supervise and perform tasks in procurement and issuance of supplies and repair parts; instruct personnel and enforce safety and security precautions; prepare records and reports, and maintain shipboard sewage systems.

An HT stationed on a tender or other auxiliary vessel or shore duty station, may perform far more tasks than listed here. HTs fabricate and repair all types of equipment and items. This expertise may include metal of all thicknesses with hand tools, welders and very large cutting, forming and shaping equipment. Having had other ratings such as molder, patternmaker, carpenter, pipefitter and others absorbed into the rating, HTs may be tasked with working with all types of materials.

== History ==
The rate hull maintenance technician has only existed in the United States Navy since 1972. Prior to that the rate was split into four different rates including plumber, shipfitter, metalsmith, and pipefitter. The history of these different rates is shown through the current rating badge. It consists of a maul; (consistent with the shipfitters and metalsmiths), an axe; (showing an in depth knowledge of firefighting and damage control), and the carpenters square; (which displays an ability to design as well as construct anything the ship may need).

Through the 1960s to the 2000s Treasure Island, San Francisco and The Naval Damage Control Training Center, located in Philadelphia, Pennsylvania were home to the Navy's damage control schools as well as the nuclear, biological, radiological and chemical warfare school, both primary schools of new hull maintenance technicians. Treasure Island continued to train new sailors in the art of damage control until the base was decommissioned in 1996. As of 2015, the damage control school is at Naval Station Great Lakes, and is on the same base as basic engineering common core and other A schools.

From 1972 to 1988 HTs assumed all the duties and responsibilities of the damage controlman rating. Even though the names merged into just HT, the responsibilities to the Navy did not lessen. HTs now had to go to their primary A school in Philadelphia to learn the HT side, and then onto Treasure Island to learn the damage control and nuclear, biological, radiological and chemical side, then onto San Diego to learn welding, brazing and sheet metal work. By 1988 the Navy realized that damage control is such a large responsibility, they needed a rating specifically tasked with its duties, hence the reemergence of the damage controlman in 1988.

== A-Schools ==
The following are all the prerequisites needed to select HT as a rating: an ASVAB line score combination of VE+AR+MK+AS=205 or VE+AR+MK+MC=205, normal color perception, normal hearing, and U.S. citizenship.

Once the prerequisites have been met the first step is boot camp in Naval Station Great Lakes. Immediately following boot camp, new sailors start their A schools. All engineering sailors go through a 10-week basic engineering common core (BECC), which is also in Naval Station Great Lakes. At BECC students will learn the basics of engineering in the US Navy. Here sailors will learn damage control, piping systems, valves, basic engines, and much more.

After BECC HTs will go to their HT A school, which is on the same base as BECC, and is 6 weeks in length. Here sailors learn drafting, blueprint reading, quality assurance, hand tools, sheet metal work, welding, brazing, pipefitting, cutting, metal identification, piping systems, measurements, shop safety, and shipboard sanitation systems.

== Everyday life of an HT ==
An HT's job in the Navy is usually very broad and sometimes challenging. An HT must be willing to learn new skills and adapt to the situation. An HT is expected to keep the sewage system in perfect working condition, conduct metal work, fabrication and welding, be able to fix, repair or replace any equipment on the ship, as well as be an integral part of the ship's damage control efforts.

According to Navy Personnel Command, an HT's duties include, but are not limited to, installing, maintaining and repairing valves, piping, plumbing system fittings and fixtures, and marine sanitation systems. Aboard larger ships such as amphibious transport docks, plumbing and sewage-related maintenance can take up the overwhelming majority of a hull technician's workload.

== See also ==
- List of United States Navy ratings
