= Beachmaster Unit One =

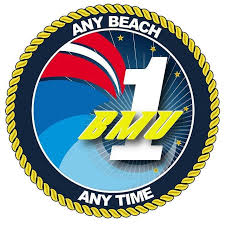
- BMU-1 Insignia
- Founded: July 13, 1949
- Country: United States
- Branch: United States Navy
- Garrison/HQ: NAB Coronado, California
- Mottos: "Any Beach, Any Time"
- Colors: Yellow patch
- Engagements: Korean War; Vietnam War; Gulf War; Operation Desert Storm; Somali Civil War; Operation Restore Hope; Operation United Shield; Global war on terrorism; Iraq War; Operation Iraqi Freedom; Operation Inherent Resolve

Commanders
- Current commander: Commander Marvin L. Joseph, USN

Beachmaster Unit One, (BMU-1) is a United States Navy amphibious beach party unit based at Naval Amphibious Base Coronado in Coronado, California. BMU-1 is the sister unit of Beachmaster Unit Two located in Norfolk, Virginia.

== Mission ==
Beachmaster Unit One deploys and supports combat ready Beach Party Teams in support of amphibious operations around the world. Their function is to control landing craft, lighterage, and amphibious vehicles in the vicinity of the beach from surf line to high water mark, and coordinate movement over the beach of equipment, troops, and supplies. They also maintain observation of wind and surf conditions, and provide limited assistance in local security and beach defense. They have the capability to provide beach and surf zone salvage with use of their LARC-V vehicle and provide the evacuation of casualties, prisoners-of-war, and non-combatants.

Beachmaster Unit 1 reports to Naval Beach Group 1.

== History ==
Beachmaster Unit was formed from the Navy Shore Party of World War II. The Shore Party formed the nucleus to which the various land and naval elements were assigned for an operation. The naval elements included the Underwater Demolition Team, a Naval Pontoon Unit, and a Boat Pool. Units called Beach Parties were formed and were composed of members of the ship's crew to ensure the mass movement and orderly flow of troops, equipment and supplies, through the surf zone, onto the hostile shore, and across the assault beaches to achieve the success of the amphibious operations. The original units consisted of approximately two officers and thirty men, to support the landing of the battalion of troops. In July 1948, the Chief of Naval Operations ordered the commissioning of the Beachmaster Unit as a separate command with designation as Beachmaster Unit One. Beachmaster Unit One was commissioned at the U.S. Naval Amphibious Base Coronado, July 13, 1949.

== Beach Party Teams ==
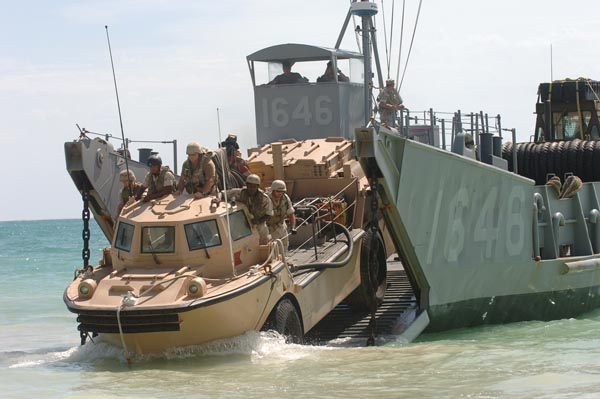
BMU-1 offloads a LARC-V onto the shore of Hawaii's Bellows Air Force Station in July 2006.

Beach Party Teams are responsible for controlling the boat traffic in the surf zone, controlling the beaching and retracting the landing craft, and directing the smooth and efficient flow of personnel and material over the beach. Beach Party Teams are led by the Beachmaster Team Commander. Beachmaster Unit One has 8 deployable departments.

- DET ALPHA
- DET BRAVO
- DET CHARLIE (Reserve)
- DET DELTA
- DET ECHO
- DET FOXTROT
- DET GOLF (Reserve)
- DET WESTPAC (DET has been commissioned as a separate command, Naval Beach Unit Seven (NBU-7) and is no longer part of BMU-1.)
