= Navy counselor =

Navy Counselor
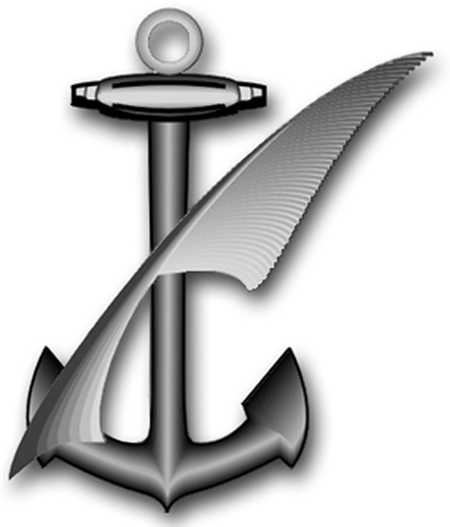
- Rating Insignia
- Issued by: United States Navy
- Type: Enlisted rating
- Abbreviation: NC
- Specialty: Administration

Navy Counselor (abbreviated as NC) is a United States Navy occupational rating.

== General description ==
There are two types of Navy Counselors that comprise one rating.

1. Career Recruiting Force, NC(R), are responsible for recruiting, career information, and counseling. They are responsible for both enlisted and officer recruiting and managing the Delayed Entry Program. They give presentations to students, civic groups, naval personnel and family members on the opportunities and advantages the Navy can offer.

Canvassing recruiters, (CANREC) are full-time support, (FTS) or drilling reservists that are hired for active duty, reserve or officer recruiting for a period of 2 years.

2. Command Career Counselors, NC(C), take care of sailors that are already in service. They are also known as "straight stick" counselors. A CCC offers career guidance to sailors aboard ships and at shore facilities. They assist commands in organizing and implementing an aggressive enlisted career information program; evaluates enlisted career information program within own command and/or subordinate commands as applicable; oversees Career development boards; counsels individuals and gives presentations to naval personnel on the advantages and current opportunities within the Navy. CCCs also serve as Transition Assistance Program Managers and provide counseling on veterans benefits and relocation programs.

== Duties ==
The duties performed by NCs include:
Interview personnel.
Career development - for Active and Reserve programs.
Prepare and deliver talks.
Organize, train, motivate and manage an aggressive career information program.
Establish and maintain liaison with local media
Recruit civilian personnel into the Navy.

== Working environment ==
Counseling duties are usually performed in an office environment. NCs work closely with others, but sometimes work independently with little supervision. Most of their work is mental.

== Requirements ==
ASVAB: VE + AR = 105 Minimum AR = 50

== See also ==
- List of United States Navy ratings
- List of counseling topics
