= Damage controlman =

US Navy and Coast Guard profession

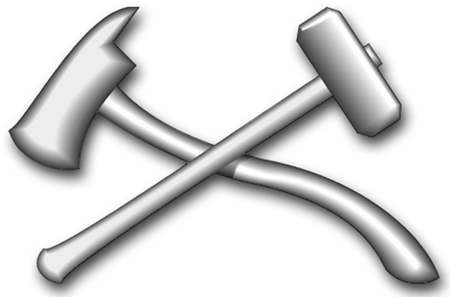
- Rating insignia
- Issued by: United States Navy; United States Coast Guard
- Type: Enlisted rating
- Abbreviation: DC
- Specialty: Hull

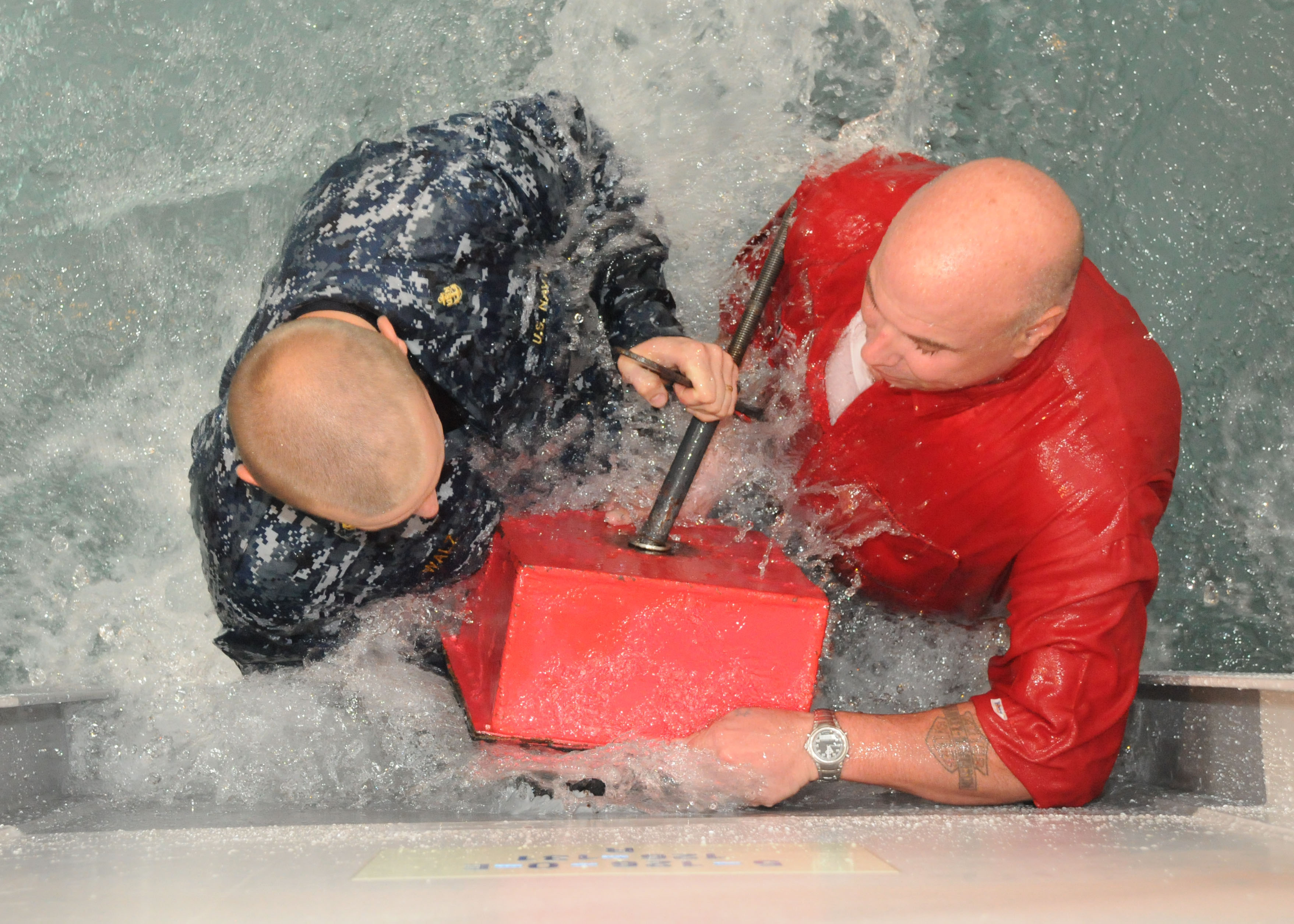
A chief damage controlman and master chief damage controlman demonstrating how to apply a box patch to a ruptured bulkhead at the Yokosuka Fire Fighting and Damage Control Training Facility

People who are in the damage controlman (DC) rating are the United States Navy's and United States Coast Guard’s maintenance and emergency repair specialists.

The damage controlman (DC) rating was established in 1948 as a consolidation of the Fireman and Painter specialties with the Carpenter's Mate rating. Their primary responsibility is to mitigate damage to ships received under either combat or non-combat conditions.

Coast Guard damage controlmen assigned to cutters are responsible for maintaining watertight integrity, emergency equipment associated with firefighting and shipboard flooding; plumbing repairs; welding fabrication and repairs; and chemical, biological, radiological, and nuclear (CBRN) warfare, detection, and decontamination. They also train others onboard in shipboard firefighting and repairing of damage to its structure. They are also involved with the engineering watches and associated duties, since it is an engineering rating.

DCs assigned ashore are responsible for the maintenance and repairs to facility structures and Coast Guard–owned housing units. Shore-side responsibilities include repairs and installations to roofs, siding, sheetrock, windows, doors, flooring, cabinets, plumbing fixtures, appliances, and many types of welding repairs. The shore-side DC also performs small construction and renovation projects. Additionally (depending on the station), they assist with nearby cutters' or small boats' maintenance. Normally, most Coast Guard units (shore and afloat) will require cross-training of other duties, including engineering for a rounded, well trained, and safer unit organization.

Navy DCs do the work necessary for damage control, ship stability, firefighting, fire prevention, and CBRN warfare & defense. They also instruct personnel in the methods of damage control and chemical, biological, radiological, and nuclear defense, and maintain/repair damage control equipment and systems. After completion of "A" school, USN damage controlmen are assigned to ships of all types in the United States or overseas; TAR damage controlmen are assigned to NRF ships in the continental United States (CONUS). In a typical 20-year period in the Navy, they spend about 65 percent of their time on sea duty and about 35 percent on shore duty. Upon completing sea tours, USN damage controlmen will be assigned to shore duty in fleet concentration areas. TAR damage controlmen will be assigned to reserve centers across the nation. While assigned to a reserve center TAR damage controlmen will train and administer selected reserve personnel.

== See also ==
- List of United States Navy ratings
- List of United States Coast Guard ratings
