= List of United States Coast Guard ratings =

The United States Coast Guard's ratings are general occupations that consist of specific skills and abilities. Each rating has its own specialty badge, which is typically worn on the left sleeve of their service dress uniform by enlisted personnel in that particular field. On operational dress uniforms, they wear generic rate designators that exclude the rating symbol. Commissioned officers do not have ratings. U.S. Coast Guard ratings are the equivalent of the rating system used by the United States Navy. The United States Army and United States Marine Corps use military occupational specialty (MOS) codes and the United States Air Force use Air Force Specialty Codes (AFSC) that service the same function as U.S. Coast Guard and U.S. Navy ratings.

Ratings should not be confused with "rates", which describe the Navy's and Coast Guard's enlisted pay-grades. Enlisted Navy and coast guardsmen are referred to by their rating and rate. For example, if someone's rate is Petty Officer 2nd Class and his rating is Boatswain's Mate; when combined, Boatswain's Mate 2nd Class (BM2) defines both. Although rates E-7 above are abbreviated similar to E-4 to E-6, the combined rating is listed before rate when completely spelled out. For instance, Master Chief Electronics Technician is abbreviated as ETCM. More examples are listed in the table below.

Electrician's Mate 3rd Class

Machinery Technician 2nd Class

Boatswain's Mate 1st Class

Chief Marine Science Technician

Senior Chief Aviation Maintenance Technician

Master Chief Health Services Technician

Command Master Chief Petty Officer

Area, Force, or Reserve Master Chief Petty Officer

Master Chief Petty Officer of the Coast Guard

Examples of U.S. Coast Guard rate and rating insignias for non-commissioned officers used to identify their rank and specialty

== Aviation group ==
| Insignia | General rating | Abbreviation |
|---|---|---|
| | Aviation Maintenance Technician | AMT |
The AMT inspects, services, maintains, troubleshoots and repairs aircraft power plant, power train and structural systems. The AMT maintains metal, composite and fiberglass materials, fabricates cables, wire harnesses and structural components; and performs aircraft corrosion control, nondestructive testing, basic electrical troubleshooting and record keeping. Additionally AMTs also hold an aircrew position in specific Coast Guard aircraft
| | Aviation Survival Technician | AST |
The Aviation Survival Technician inspects, services, maintains, troubleshoots and repairs aircraft and aircrew survival equipment and rescue devices. Additionally, ASTs perform the duties of a rescue swimmer and provide aircrew survival training to all aviators.
| | Avionics Electrical Technician | AET |
Inspects, services, maintains, troubleshoots and repairs aircraft power, communications, navigation, auto flight and sensor systems. AETs perform minimum performance checks, system alignments, avionics corrosion control and record keeping. Additionally, AETs hold an aircrew position in specific Coast Guard aircraft.

== Administrative and scientific group ==
| Insignia | General rating | Abbreviation |
|---|---|---|
| | Health Services Technician | HS |
The health services technician (HS) provides emergency healthcare services and daily medical care for Coast Guard personnel and their families. An HS tasks include assisting medical and dental officers; performing diagnostic testing, x-rays, lab tests, prescribing medications, administering immunizations and performing minor surgical procedures. An HS is normally assigned to a large Coast Guard clinic, small sick bay ashore or aboard a cutter.
| | Marine Science Technician | MST |
MSTs conduct marine-safety activities such as investigating pollution incidents, monitoring pollution cleanups, conducting foreign-vessel boardings to enforce pollution and navigation safety laws, conducting harbor patrols for port safety and security, inspecting waterfront facilities and supervising the loading of explosives on vessels. Most are assigned to shore-based field units such as sectors. They may be assigned to the National Strike Force for oil and hazardous-material response. MSTs are also the Coast Guard's safety and environmental health experts ashore.
| | Musician | MU |
The musician rating is limited to members of the Coast Guard Band. Those who join the band do so following an audition process and automatically enlist as a Petty Officer 1st Class (E-6).
| | Public Affairs Specialist | PA |
Reports and edits news; publishes information about service members and activities through newspapers, magazines, radio and television; and shoots and develops film and photographs
| | Storekeeper | SK |
Orders, receives, stores, inventories and issues clothing, food, mechanical equipment and other items.
| | Culinary Specialist | CS |
Cooks and bakes; prepares menus; keeps cost accounts; assists in ordering provisions; and inspects food. Rating name changed from "FS" (Food Service Specialist) on 6 January 2017.
| | Yeoman | YN |
Prepares and routes correspondence and reports; and maintains personnel records and publications. Processes and counsels on various pay entitlements.

== Deck & weapons group ==
| Insignia | General rating | Abbreviation |
|---|---|---|
| | Boatswain's Mate | BM |
Operates small boats; stores cargo; handles ropes and lines; and directs work of deck force. Performs navigation of ship's steering; lookout supervision, ship control, bridge watch duties, visual communication and maintenance of navigational aids. The most versatile rating in the Coast Guard, and the only rating that can lead to a command position. (This rating is a combination of the previous USCG ratings of Quartermaster and Boatswain's Mate).
| | Maritime Law Enforcement Specialist | ME |
Serves as a specialist in maritime law enforcement and security. The rating was officially established January 1, 2010 when 1,053 active duty and 988 reserve members transitioned from existing ratings and became maritime enforcement specialists. The new rating is designed to enhance the Coast Guard's capabilities as America's maritime guardians and support the Coast Guard's modernization goal of developing a force structure responsive to mission execution.
| | Gunner's Mate | GM |
Operates and performs maintenance on guided missile launching systems, rocket launchers, guns and gun mounts; inspects/repairs electrical, electronic, pneumatic, mechanical and hydraulic systems
| | Operations Specialist | OS |
Operates telecommunications equipment and sensors and controls operations in Rescue Coordination Centers, cutters and stations
| | Intelligence specialist | IS |
Intelligence specialists are involved in collecting and interpreting intelligence, especially about enemies or potential enemies. They analyze photographs and prepare charts, maps, and reports that describe in detail the strategic situation all over the world.

== Engineering & hull group ==
| Insignia | General rating | Abbreviation |
|---|---|---|
| | Damage Controlman | DC |
Fabricates, installs and repairs shipboard structures, plumbing and piping systems; uses damage control in fire fighting; operates nuclear, biological, chemical and radiological defense equipment; construction work.
| | Electrician's Mate | EM |
Tests, maintains and repairs electrical equipment including navigation, identification, detection, reconnaissance, special purpose equipment and conducts electrical training for all MK's throughout the fleet; operates warfare equipment. Electrician's Mates don't work on avionics, only shipboard maintenance and residential electrical work.
| | Electronics Technician | ET |
Maintains all electronic equipment used for communications, detection ranging, recognition and countermeasures, worldwide navigational systems, computers and sonars. ET's also maintain towers and antennas. Note: Electronics Technicians can work for the operations, engineering, or combat systems department, depending on the type of cutter. They also do the jobs that were once done by the Fire Control Technicians, including maintaining and operating the fire control radars, and firing the major weapons systems on the boat including the 57 MM cannon and the CIWS anti-ship missile defense system.
| | Machinery Technician | MK |
Operates, maintains and repairs ship's propulsion, auxiliary equipment and outside equipment such as steering, engineer, refrigeration/air conditioning and steam equipment
| | Information Systems Technician | IT |
Operates communication equipment; transmits, receives and processes all forms of military record and voice communications. Installs and maintains telecommunications equipment ranging from pole lines and underground cables to computer-based data communications and processing systems, telephone and data switching systems and networks, and public address, security and remote control systems
| | Diver | DV |
Created in 2014. They sweep ports and waterways during coastal security missions; conduct salvage and recovery operations; inspect Coast Guard cutter hulls; survey coral reefs and environmental sensitive areas; repair, maintain and place of aids to navigation; conduct polar operations as well as conduct joint operations with United States and international military divers.
| | Cyber Mission Specialist | CMS |
Provides defensive and offensive cyber operations; protects Coast Guard and Department of Defense networks; identifies and mitigates cyber threats; and conducts digital forensics and electronic investigations to ensure the security of maritime critical infrastructure.

== Reserve specific group ==
| Insignia | General rating | Abbreviation |
|---|---|---|
| | Investigator | IV |
Provide support to Coast Guard law-enforcement and intelligence missions. Conduct both criminal and personal background checks and investigations, collect and analyze intelligence information and provide personal protection services to high-ranking Coast Guard officials and other VIPs. Currently the only Coast Guard rating not eligible to active duty enlisted Coast Guardsmen.

== Command group ==
| Insignia | General rating | Abbreviation |
|---|---|---|
| | Command Master Chief Petty Officer | CMC |
Command Master Chief Petty Officers (CMC) are the senior most E-9 enlisted member of a Coast Guard unit and are senior advisors to their unit's commanding officer.
| | Area, Force, Reserve, and Coast Guard Master Chief Petty Officer | AMCPO, RFMC, MCPOCGRF and MCPOCG |
Area Master Chief Petty Officer, Rating Force Master Chief Petty Officer, Master Chief Petty Officer of the Coast Guard Reserve Force, and Master Chief Petty Officer of the Coast Guard are the senior most CMC to an Area command or the Coast Guard itself and are also senior advisors to the flag officer in command at that level.

== Obsolete ratings (1943-Present) ==
| Insignia | General rating | Abbreviation |
|---|---|---|
| | Aviation Electrician's Mate | AE |
This rating was disestablished on 1 June 1999 and was absorbed into the AET rating. Active in the U.S. Navy.
| | Aviation Structural Mechanic | AM |
This rating was disestablished in 1999 and was absorbed into the AMT rating. Active in the Navy.
| | Data Processing Technician | DP |
This reserve specific rating was disestablished in 1999 and was absorbed into the TC rating.
| | Dental Technician | DT |
This rating was disestablished in 1983 and was absorbed into the HS rating.
| | Fire & Safety Specialist | FF |
This rating was disestablished in 1993 and was absorbed into the PS rating (which further merged into ME).
| | Fire Control Technician | FT |
This rating was disestablished in July 2003 and was absorbed into the ET rating. Active in the Navy.
| | Quartermaster | QM |
This rating was disestablished in July 2003 and was absorbed into the BM and OS ratings. Active in the Navy.
| | Radarman | RD |
This rating was disestablished in July 2003 and was absorbed into the OS rating.
| | Radioman/Telecommunications Specialist | RM/TC |
These two ratings no longer exist, as RMs were converted to TCs in 1995, and the TC rating was then disestablished in 2003; 75% of the workforce moved to the OS rating and the remaining 25% moved to the IT rating.
| | Sonar Technician | ST |
ST, original name was Soundman (SO) 1943-1970, was disestablished in 1993 and was absorbed into the ET and OS ratings. Active in the Navy.
| | Telephone Technician | TT |
TT was disestablished in 2003 and was absorbed into the IT rating. Despite this change, the rating device remained the same.
| | Port Security Specialist | PS |
PS was disestablished and merged into the Maritime Enforcement (ME) rating in 2010. Port Security Specialists supported Department of Defense national-defense operations overseas as a member of a Naval Coastal Warfare Squadron, or a Coast Guard Port Security Unit. Worked at a Sector to ensure the physical security of a major U.S. port, or were members of a Maritime Safety and Security Team (MSST). MSSTs are capable of being deployed throughout the United States to provide heightened waterside and shoreside security in support of maritime homeland security operations.

== See also ==
- List of United States Coast Guard enlisted ranks
- United States Coast Guard officer rank insignia
- Badges of the United States Coast Guard
- Obsolete badges of the United States military
- List of United States Navy ratings
- List of United States Army careers
- List of United States Marine Corps MOS
- List of United States Navy staff corps
- Air Force Specialty Code
