= Electronics technician (United States Navy) =

Designation in the United States navy

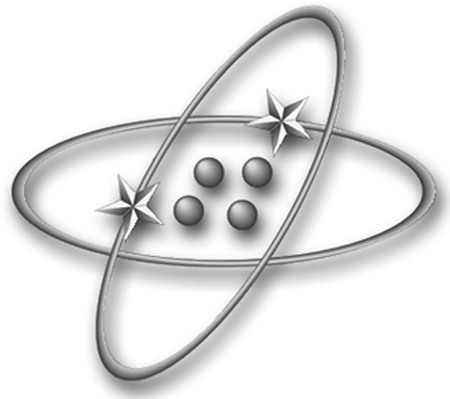
- Rating insignia
- Issued by: United States Navy
- Type: Enlisted rating
- Abbreviation: ET
- Specialty: Technical

The United States Navy job rating of electronics technician (ET) is a designation given by the Bureau of Naval Personnel (BUPERS) to enlisted members who satisfactorily complete initial Electronics Technician "A" school training.

== History of the Electronics Technician rating ==
=== WWII era ===
The Electronics Technician (abbreviated as ET) rating was originally established as Radio Technician (abbreviated as RT) in April 1942 during the height of World War II. The story of their training may be found at "Solving the Naval Radar Crisis" by Raymond C Watson, Jr. Trafford Publishing 2007 ISBN 978-1-4251-6884-1. The rating insignia adopted was that of the established Radioman (abbreviated as RM) rating, and remained until October 1945, when the rating name was changed to Electronic Technician's Mate (abbreviated as ETM). In 1948, the Navy changed the name of the rating to Electronics Technician, and a new rating insignia was created.

=== Vietnam era to present ===
In 1971 the Radarman (abbreviated as RD) rating was disestablished. Former Radarmen, depending on their training, were placed in to the either the established Electronic Technician (ET) rating or either of the newly established Operations Specialist (abbreviated as OS) or Electronic Warfare Technician (abbreviated as EW) ratings.

On 1 October 1998, the Data Systems Technicians (abbreviated as DS) rating was disestablished. Former Data Systems Technicians were, depending on their training, placed in to either the Electronics Technician or Fire Controlman (abbreviated as FC) rating.

=== Creation of the service ratings ET, ETR, ETV, and ETN ===
On 3 November 2015, a mostly administrative change was made to the general ET rating.

- Electronics Technicians who volunteered for submarine duty were redesignated as either
  - Electronics Technician, Submarine, Communications (abbreviated as ETR) or
  - Electronics Technician, Submarine, Navigation (abbreviated as ETV).
- Nuclear Power trained Electronics Technicians were redesignated as Electronics Technicians, Nuclear Power (abbreviated as ETN).
- Electronics Technicians serving in the service rating Electronics Technician (ET) remained designed as Electronics Technician (ET). Electronics Technician (ET) is sometimes abbreviated as ETSW (Surface Warfare - communications, radar, and navigation) when it is necessary to distinguish ET from ETR (sub comm), ETV (sub navigation), and ETN (nuclear power).

All three new ratings as well as the original Electronics Technician rating use the same Electronics Technician rating insignia.

The reason for the change is because even though these four service ratings (ET, ETR, ETV, and ETN) fall under the same general rating (ET), share a common history, have similar names and share the same rating insignia; the enlistment requirements (e.g. submarine ratings are volunteer duty), initial 'A' school training, specialized 'C' school training, job assignments (billets), specific qualification, and community managers are unique to each of the four service rating. This prevents someone trained in any of the four service rating from easily transferring to another of the four service rating without first going through significant retraining and qualification that would be required by anyone transferring from any of the other general rating in the Navy.

There is prior usage to ETN and ETR. At least through the 1970s, the "N" represented a Communications ET while the "R" represented a Radar ET. This was usually determined by the ET "A" School curriculum taken by the student in later phases of training. The "N" or "R" designation only applied to 3rd or 2nd class petty officers (paygrades E4 and E5). 1st class and chief petty officers (paygrades E6 through E9) did not have a "N" or "R" designation.

=== Elimination of all naval ratings ===
On 29 September 2016, the Navy moved away from traditional ratings to an alphanumeric system of Navy Occupational Specialty (NOS) codes. The ET-related NOS codes were: for ET, B420; for ETR, C126; for ETV, C121; for ETN, D110, D111, or D112.

On 21 December 2016, however, after months of widespread complaints, Chief of Naval Operations John Richardson released a message announcing a restoration of all U.S. Navy Ratings.

== Electronics technician service ratings ==
=== Electronics technician (ET) ===
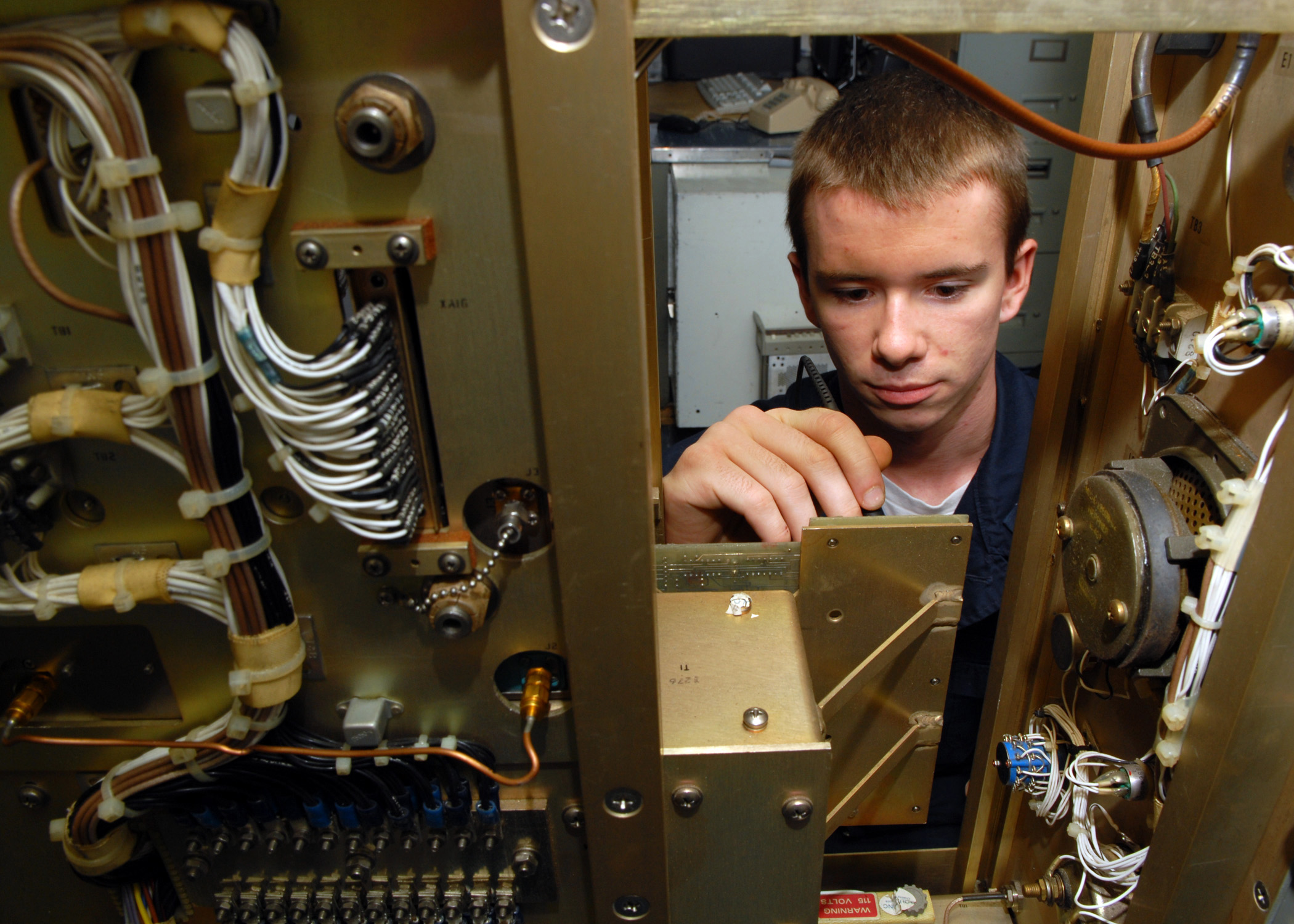
USS Abraham Lincoln (CVN-72).

==== General description ====
ETs are responsible for electronic equipment used to send and receive messages, computer information systems, long range radar, and calibration of test equipment. They maintain, repair, calibrate, tune, and adjust electronic equipment used for communications, detection and tracking, recognition and identification, navigation.

==== Working environment ====
Jobs performed by ETs are performed throughout the Navy's fleet of surface ships including aircraft carriers and Aegis cruisers and destroyers, and at communication activities and repair activities ashore.

==== Minimum requirements ====
- ASVAB: MK + EI + GS = 156 + AR = 223
- Must have normal color perception
- Must have normal hearing
- Security clearance required
- Must be a U.S. Citizen

==== Employment and subspecialties ====
Entry rates ET3-ET2 (E4-E5) specialize as electronics communications technician, electronics data systems technician, or electronics radar systems technician. ET1-ETC (E6-E7) are electronics systems managers.

===== Electronics Communications Technicians =====
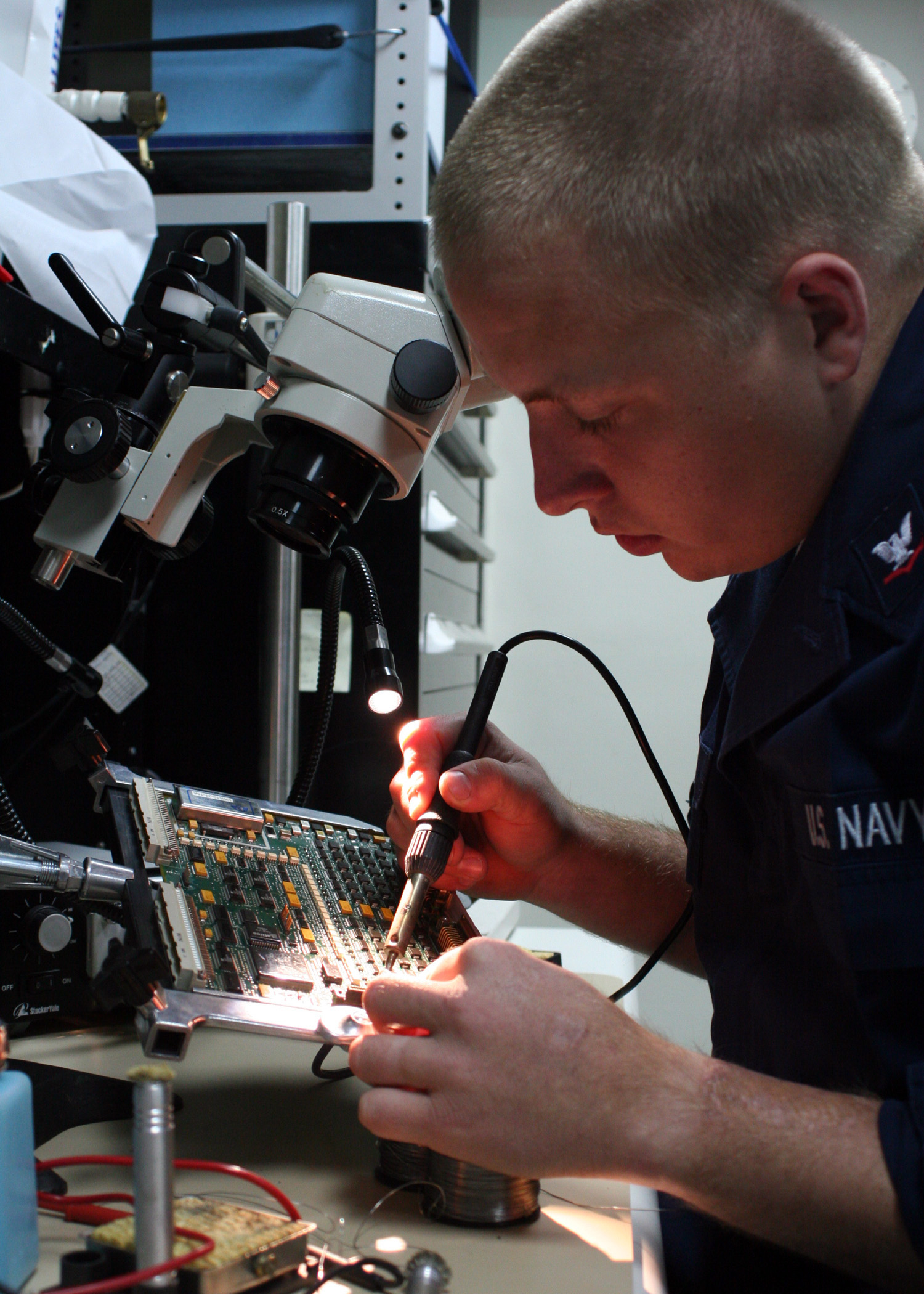
An Electronics Technician (ET) Petty Officer Third Class repairs a circuit board in the 2M shop aboard the amphibious transport dock ship USS San Antonio

Maintain shore-based, ship-based, portable communications equipment, and portable Mechatronic equipment. Specific duties include the following:

- All associated cabling, computer, multiplexing, motor, switching, cryptographic, recording, water cooling and air dry systems for communications equipment
- Analyze equipment operation and performance
- Troubleshoot using digital multimeters, oscilloscopes, and other test equipment
- Repair equipment to the lowest replaceable unit
- Execute casualty control procedures on failed equipment and restore operability, taking into account mission criticality and redundancies within systems
- Operate, maintain, and repair motors and motor controls for satellite antennas, radar cooling motor control pumps
- Maintain and update knowledge of electrical motor characteristics (brush and brushless), fiber optics, soldering repair, electrical safety checks, and test equipment calibration
- Perform administrative functions that include the updating of casualty reporting messages, technical manuals, equipment maintenance records, and managing test equipment calibration requirements
- Supervise personnel who maintain tools and test equipment, support logistics operations, and perform verification testing of new systems and equipment

===== Electronics Data Systems Technicians =====
Maintain data link, inertial navigation, tactical network, message routing, digital production/projection, calibration, fiber optics, micro-miniature module test and repair, computer-based, and peripheral computer systems; analyze equipment operation, establish computer and network configurations, and troubleshoot and repair computer-based equipment to the lowest replaceable unit; execute casualty control procedures, restoring operability for all assigned electronic equipment, recognizing mission criticality and redundancies within systems; perform administrative functions that include the updating of casualty reporting messages, technical manuals, equipment maintenance records, and managing test equipment calibration requirements; complete fiber optic and basic soldering repair, electrical safety checks, and test equipment calibration; and supervise personnel who complete maintenance, conduct tool, MAM, and test equipment inventories, logistics support, and operational verification testing of new systems or equipment.

===== Electronics Radar Systems Technicians =====
Maintain surface search, air search, and weather radar systems, radar video switchboards, synchros, Identification Friend or Foe (IFF) equipment, tactical air navigation equipment, including all associated cabling, cooling water and dry air systems; analyze equipment operation and align, troubleshoot, and repair equipment to the lowest replaceable unit; execute casualty control procedures, restoring operability for all assigned electronic equipment, recognizing mission criticality and redundancies within systems; perform administrative functions that include managing test equipment calibration requirements and the updating of casualty reporting messages, technical manuals, and equipment maintenance records; complete, fiber optic and basic soldering repair, electrical safety checks, and test equipment calibration; and supervise personnel who complete maintenance, conduct tool, MAM, and test equipment inventories, logistics support, and operational verification testing of new systems or equipment.

==== Required training ====
Enlistees are taught the fundamentals of the ET rating through the following formal Navy schooling.

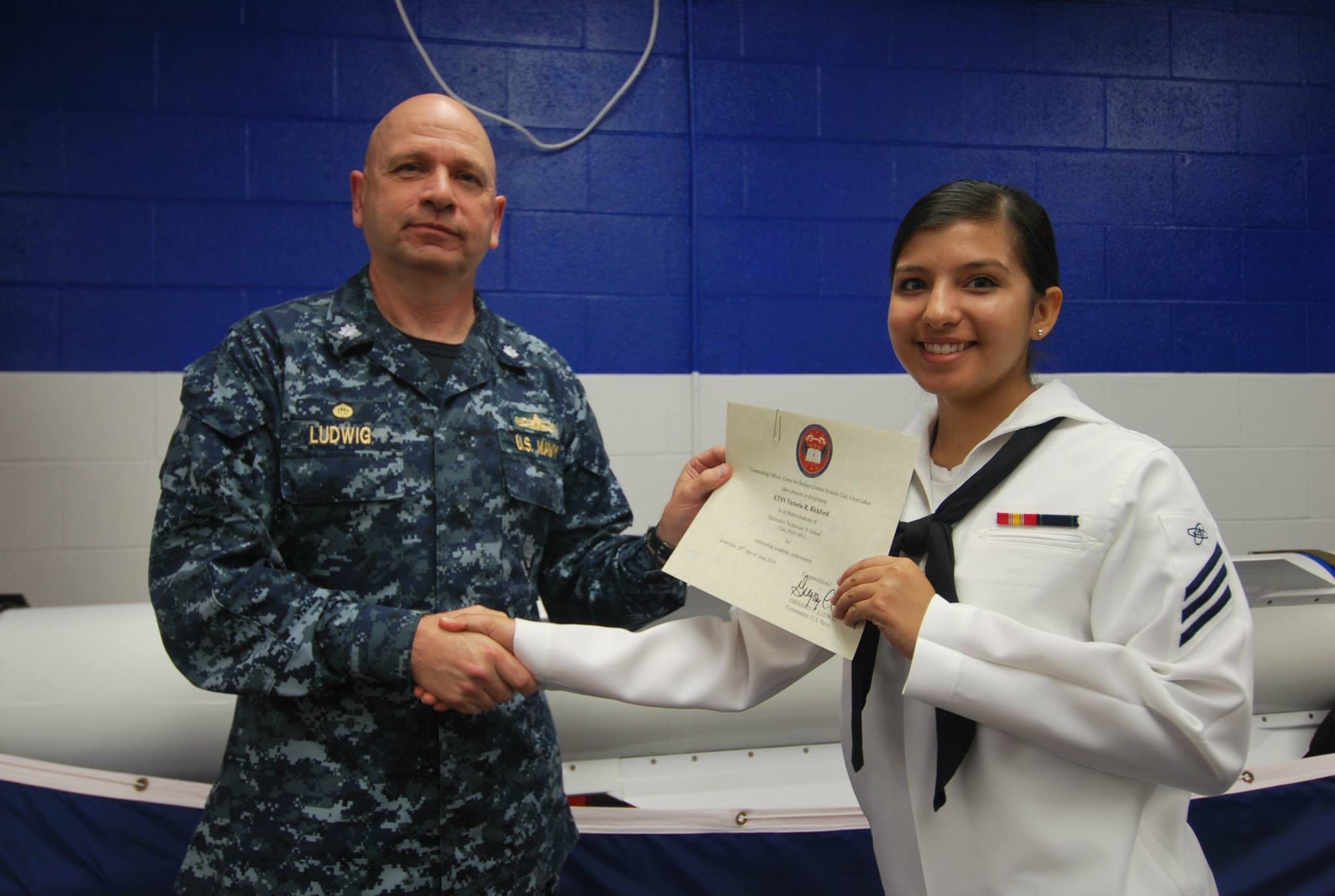
An Electronics Technician (ET) Seaman receiving a certificate upon graduating from ET 'A' School.

School	Present Location	Approximate Training Time	Subjects	Training Methods	Reference
Apprentice Technical Training (ATT)	Great Lakes, Ill.	13 Weeks	Basic electronics and electronic circuitry, safety, digital theory, microcomputers, fiber optics, test equipment and trouble-shooting techniques.	Computer Based Training and laboratory application with multiple choice tests and practical laboratory performance tests.	
ET "A" School	Great Lakes, Ill.	22 Weeks	Communications Suite (SATCOM, HF receiver / transmitter), 2D Surface radar transmitters / receivers, Radar Display.	Computer Based Training and laboratory application with written tests and practical laboratory performance tests.	

After "A" school, ETs continue on to advanced "C" schools. School lengths and content vary, but many colleges and universities offer college credits for these Navy courses.

==== Electronics Technician Navy Enlisted Classifications ====
The Navy Enlisted Classification (NEC) system supports the enlisted rating structure in identifying personnel and billets in manpower authorizations. NEC codes identify a non-rating wide skill, knowledge, aptitude, or qualification that must be documented to identify both people and billets for management purposes. The most current information regarding NECs can be found in the Navy NEOCS Manual.

After 'A' school and between duty assignments ETs will attend advanced 'C' school training. These 'C' school give the ET advanced training in the specific systems that will be required to maintain and repair at their next duty assignment.

There are 62 ET-related NECs.

The follow NEC list is incomplete:

NEC Code	NEC Title	School Locations	NEC Code	NEC Title	School Locations
1402	Tactical Communications Maintenance Technician		1403	AN/WSC-6(V)5 Super High Frequency (SHF) Satellite Communications (SATCOM) Maintenance	Norfolk, VA
1404	AN/WSC-8 Super High Frequency (SHF) Satellite Communications (SATCOM) Maintenance		1405	AN/WSC-6(V)7 Combatant Super High Frequency (SHF) Satellite Communications (SATCOM) Maintenance	Norfolk, VA San Diego, CA
1406	AN/WSC-6(V)9 Combatant Super High Frequency (SHF) Satellite Communications (SATCOM) Maintenance	Norfolk, VA San Diego, CA	1407	AN/SSC-12 Shipboard Air Traffic Control Communications (SATCC) Technician	
1410	AN/SRC-55(V) HYDRA Technician	Norfolk, VA San Diego, CA	1413	Meteorologist Equipment Maintenance Technician	Biloxi, MS
1415	Combined Shore Communications Maintenance Technician		1419	Electromagnetic Compatibility Technician	Norfolk, VA
1420	Surface HF Communications System Maintenance Technician, src-16 hf data transceiver link-11	San Diego, CA	1424	Communications Equipment (SRQ-4) Technician	Norfolk, VA San Diego, CA
1425	Communications Equipment (WSC-3/UHF DAMA) Technician	Norfolk, VA San Diego, CA	1428	Small Combatant Communications Electronic Subsystem Technician	San Diego, CA
1429	Flight Deck Communications Systems (FDCS) Maintenance Technician		1430	AN/USC-38 (V)2, 3 Maintenance Technician	Norfolk, VA San Diego, CA
1433	Super High Frequency (SHF) Satellite Communications (SATCOM) Maintenance Technician		1452	NAVMACS(V)3 Shipboard Maintenance Technician	San Diego, CA
1456	FLTSATCOM (CUDIXS/DAMA NAVCOMMSTA) Maintenance Technician		1458	VERDIN/ISABPS Communications Systems Technician	Norfolk, VA
1460	Communications Security (COMSEC) Maintenance Technician	Norfolk, VA San Diego, CA	1465	Special Maintenance (AN/GSC-52(V), GSC-39, FSC-78/79 SHF Satellite Terminal) Technician	Fort Gordon, GA
1468	Special Maintenance (SHF SATCOM System) Technician		1471	URN-25 Tactical Air Navigation Technician	Norfolk, VA San Diego, CA
1486	Single Audio System (SAS)	Norfolk, VA San Diego, CA	1491	FFG-7 Class Navigation Electronics Subsystem Technician	Norfolk, VA San Diego, CA
1493	Tactical Support Communications (TSCOMM) Replacement Program Maintenance Technician	Jacksonville, FL	1494	LHD Class Radio Communications System Maintenance Technician	Dam Neck, VA
1495	AN/SYQ-13 NAV/C2 Maintainer		1503	Radar (SPS-49) Technician	San Diego, CA
1504	Radar (SPS-55) Technician	Norfolk, VA San Diego, CA	1507	Radar (SPS-67(V)) Technician	San Diego, CA
1510	Radar (AN/SPS-49(V)5 and 7) Technician	San Diego, CA	1511	Radar (AN/SPS-40E) Technician	
1517	DASR/STARS Maintenance Technician Pipeline	Pensacola, FL	1520	AN/SPS-73 Maintenance Technician	Norfolk, VA San Diego, CA
1529	Standard Terminal Automation Replacement System (STARS) Maintenance Technician	Pensacola, FL	1530	Digital Airport Surveillance Radar (DASR)	Pensacola, FL
1568	AN/TPX-42A(V)13 Shipboard DAIR Maintenance Technician		1570	Air Traffic Control Communications Technician	Pensacola, FL
1571	AN/UPX-29(V) Ship System Maintainer	Saint Inigoes, MD	1572	AIMS System Technician	Norfolk, VA
1574	DAIR/GCA (TPX-42) Maintenance Technician		1576	CATC DAIR Maintenance Technician	
1579	Precision Approach Radar Technician	Pensacola, FL	1580	ASR-8 Maintenance Technician	
1589	Fleet Electronics Calibration (FECL) Technician	Biloxi, MS	1590	AN/SPN-46(V) Radar Technician	Pensacola, FL
1591	Miniature/ Microminiature Module Test and Repair (2MTR) Technicians	Multiple locations	1592	AN/TPX-42A(V)14 Shipboard DAIR Maintenance Technician	Pensacola, FL
9509	2-M Instructor	Norfolk, VA San Diego, CA Whidbey Island, WA ATSUGI JAPAN	9604	JTIDS Shipboard Terminal Maintenance Technician	Dam Neck, VA
9605	Naval Modular Automated Communications Systems II (NAVMACS II) Maintenance Technician	Norfolk, VA San Diego, CA	9606	Shipboard Air Traffic Control (SATC) Radar Technician (AN/SPS-43C)	
9607	High Frequency Radio Group (HFRG) Maintenance Technician	San Diego, CA	9608	Radar Technician (AN/SPS-67(V)3)	Norfolk, VA
9610	Radar (AN/SPS-49A(V)) Technician	Norfolk, VA	9611	AN/SSN-2(V)4 Maintainer	
9612	AN/WSN-7(V) Operations and Maintenance Technician	Dam Neck, VA	9613	Naval Special Warfare (NSW) Communications Technician	Coronado, CA
9614	AN/SPN-35C Maintenance Technician	Pensacola, FL	9615	AN/SPS-67(V)5 Radar Technician	Norfolk, VA

=== Submarines: Electronics Technician Communications (ETR) and Electronics Technician Navigation (ETV) ===
==== General description ====
The Navy's Submarine Electronics / Computer Field (SECF) offers extensive training in the operation and maintenance of "Today's High Technology" advanced electronics equipment, digital systems and computers used in submarine combat control, sonar, navigation and communications systems. An individual selecting SECF will receive training in electricity, electronics, computers, digital systems, fiber optics and electronics repair. The standards for selection for enlistment in the Navy's Submarine Electronics/ Computer Field are high. Personnel interested in applying for the Submarine Electronics/ Computer Field should be seriously interested in pursuing the challenge this highly technical field offers. They must be mature, ready to take on significant responsibility and willing to apply themselves.

==== What they do ====
Volunteers for the Submarine Electronics/Computer Field will specialize in one of four Submarine Ratings (Electronics Technician – Communications (ETR), Electronics Technician – Navigation (ETV), Fire Control Technician (FT), and Sonar Technician Submarines (STS) working in one of four areas: combat systems, communications, navigation or underwater acoustic technologies. All four ratings/specialty areas are heavily involved with computer and electronics systems. The communications specialty (ETR) is responsible for all operational and administrative aspects of the submarine's radio communication equipment, systems and programs. The navigation specialty (ETV) is responsible for all operational and administrative aspects of the submarine's navigation and radar equipment, systems and programs.

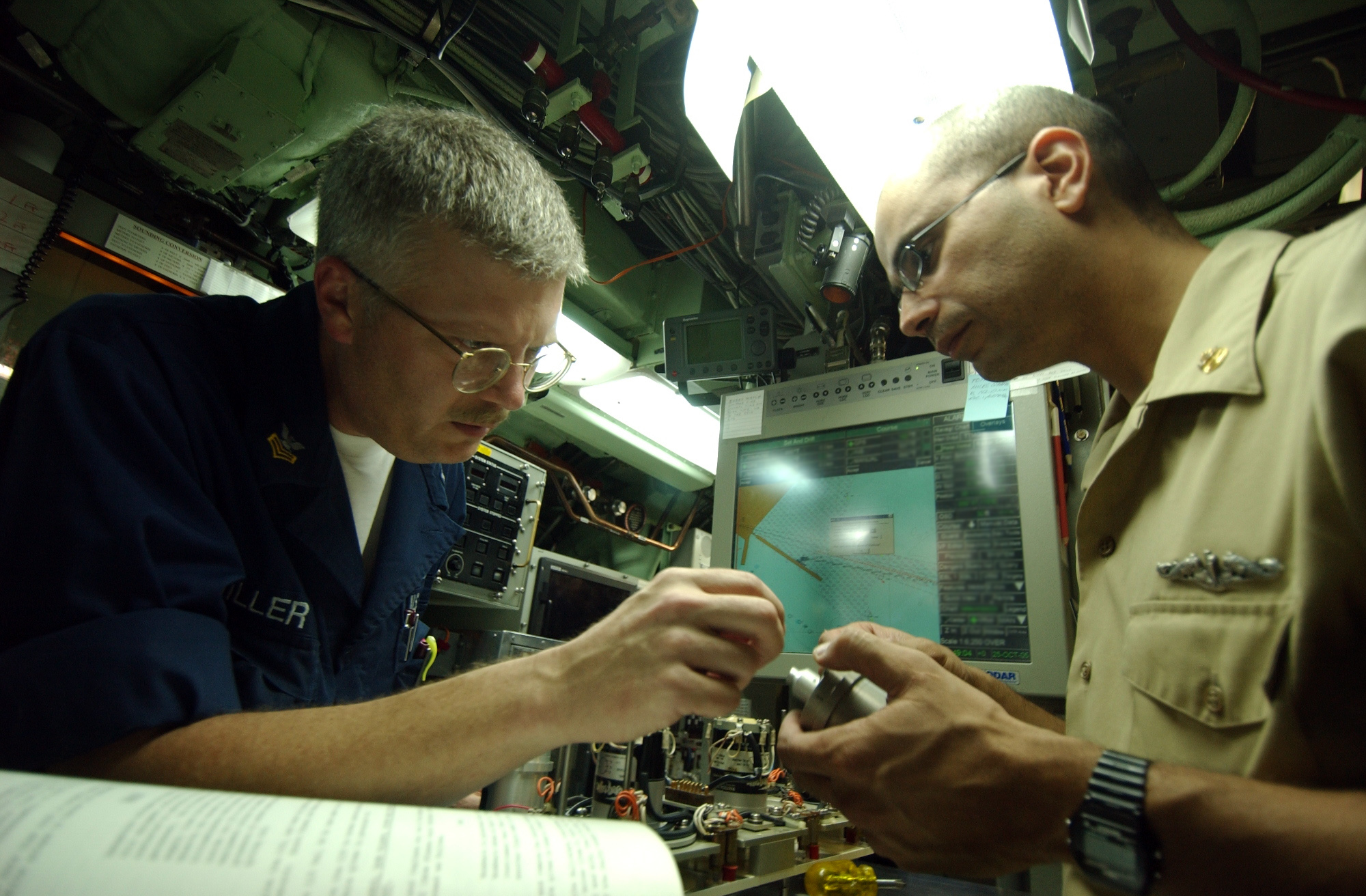
A Navigation Electronics Technician (ETV) Petty Officer First Class work on an assembly piece for the stern plane angle indicator aboard the submarine USS Annapolis

==== Minimum requirements ====
- ASVAB: AR + MK + EI + GS = 222 or VE + AR + MK + MC = 222
- Must have normal color perception
- Must have normal hearing
- Top Secret Security Clearance
- Must be U.S. Citizen
- Must volunteer for submarine duty
- Must have no record of conviction by civil court for any offense other than minor traffic
- Moral turpitude offenses are generally disqualifying
- No history of drug abuse.

==== Required training ====
Submarine ETs (navigation and communications) must complete Basic Enlisted Submarine School, ATT, Tactical Computer and Network Operator, and "A" School at Naval Submarine School in Groton, CT.

===== Electronics Technician Communication (ETR) =====
School	Present Location	Approximate Training Time	Subjects	Training Methods	Reference
Basic Enlisted Submarine School	Groton, CT	4 Weeks	Indoctrination in basic submarine systems.	Group instruction and practical application.	
Class "A" Technical School and Specialty Pipeline School	Groton, CT	14-28 Weeks	Basic electricity, electronics and computer technical knowledge and skills and preparation for communications specialties and assignment on a fast attack or ballistic missile submarine.	Group instruction, practical application and equipment labs.	

====== Electronics Technician Communication Naval Enlisted Classifications ======
NEC Code	NEC Title	NEC Code	NEC Title	References
14AA	Common Submarine Radio Room (CSRR) Maintenance Technician	14AB	Common Submarine Radio Room (CSRR) Equipment Operator	
14BH	SSN 774 Class Electronic Support Equipment Maintenance Technician	14CM	SSN Radio Frequency (RF) Equipment Technician	
14EM	SSN ESM Equipment Maintenance Technician	14HH	SSN 21 Class ESM Technician	
14TM	TRIDENT I/II Radio Frequency (RF) Equipment Maintenance Technician	14RO	SSN Radio Frequency (RF) Equipment Operator	
14TO	TRIDENT I/II Radio Frequency (RF) Equipment Operator	14ZA	AN/BRD-7 Submarine Radio Direction Finding (RDF) Set Maintenance Technician	
14ZQ	SSN/SSGN AN/BLQ-10A (V) Submarine Electronic Warfare Support (ES) Equipment Operator	14ZR	SSN/SSBN AN/WLR-8(v) Submarine Electronic Warfare Support (ES) Equipment Operator	

===== Electronics Technician Navigation (ETV) =====
School	Present Location	Approximate Training Time	Subjects	Training Methods	Reference
Basic Enlisted Submarine School	Groton, CT	4 Weeks	Indoctrination in basic submarine systems.	Group instruction and practical application.	
Class "A" Technical School and Specialty Pipeline School	Groton, CT	14-28 Weeks	Basic electricity, electronics and computer technical knowledge and skills and preparation for navigations specialties and assignment on a fast attack or ballistic missile submarine.	Group instruction, practical application and equipment labs.	

====== Electronics Technician Navigation Naval Enlisted Classifications ======
NEC Code	NEC Title	NEC Code	NEC Title	References
14GM	SSGN Navigation Maintenance Electronics Technician	14NM	Navigation Equipment Maintenance Technician	
14NO	Navigation Equipment Operator	14NP	SSN 774 Class Navigation and Ship's Electronic Equipment Technician	
14NV	SSN/SSBN Assistant Navigator	14TK	SSN 21 Navigation Technician	
14XM	Electronics Technician Trident II SWS D-5 Backfit SWS Navigation Maintenance Technician	14XO	Electronics Technician Trident II SWS D-5 Backfit SWS Navigation Operator	
3329	Navigation Electronics Operations and Maintenance Technician (TRIDENT II D5 Backfit SWS)			

=== Electronics Technician Nuclear Power (ETN) ===
Nuclear-trained ETNs perform duties in nuclear propulsion plants primarily in operating, maintaining, and repairing reactor instrumentation and control systems. ETNs may be assigned as an operator to a nuclear-powered aircraft carrier or submarine, as an instructor at a Navy nuclear power training command, or as a technician at a shipyard or other nuclear support facility. Additionally ETNs may volunteer for nuclear submarine service. ETNs are the only rating in the Navy that can qualify as a reactor operator of a naval nuclear propulsion plant.

==== Training ====
ETNs complete several different phases of training in order to be able to operate a naval nuclear propulsion plant. In order to be selected for nuclear training prospective Navy recruits must have a high enough cutscore on the Armed Service Vocational Battery (ASVAB) that score being greater than 88 and the Navy Advanced Placement Test (NAPT) that score being greater than 55%. Prospective nuclear recruits are then sent to Navy boot camp where prospective nuclear trainees are selected in a 50-30-20 ratio to be trained as nuclear machinist's mates, nuclear electrician's mate, or nuclear electronics technicians. Those who are selected to be nuclear electronics technicians then enter the Navy Nuclear Pipeline to train to become an ETN.

In the first stage of training in the Navy Nuclear Pipeline, prospective ETNs are trained for six months at the Nuclear Field 'A' School (NFAS) at the Naval Nuclear Power Training Command (NNPTC) in Goose Creek, SC. The curriculum at NFAS includes a mathematics refresher course, basic electronics theory, analog electronics theory (EFUNDS), digital electronics theory, and instrumentation and control equipment (I&CE) theory and maintenance. The curriculum is presented in a high paced manner that ramps up over the term at NFAS in order to prepare students for the difficulties of Nuclear Power School. The curriculum is very similar to that which is presented to nuclear electricians except that nuclear electricians train in electrical motor and generator theory and maintenance instead of I&CE theory and maintenance. Due to the specialized training given at NFAS, ETNs who have trained there instead of another ET 'A' school are not qualified to be assigned to billets designed for non-nuclear ETs. Personnel who are disqualified from Navy nuclear work ('de-nuked') or who fail to qualify for Navy nuclear work later in the pipeline are reclassified and retrained into another rating in order to remain in the Navy. ETN is not eligible for direct conversion to ET. This means that for an ETN to become an ET they must attend the ET 'A' school.

In the second stage of training in the Navy Nuclear Pipeline, ETNs are trained for six months at the Nuclear Power School at the NNPTC. The curriculum for ETNs at the Nuclear Power School includes a higher level mathematics (Calculus) refresher course, introduction to nuclear propulsion systems, Navy nuclear mechanical, electrical, and electronics system design, reactor theory, health physics, basic materials science, and chemistry as it applies to nuclear power plants. The curriculum is similar for MMNs, EMNs, and ETNs, except that each rating focuses more on their particular nuclear system design (for nuclear ETNs this means that they have additional training in nuclear electronics design).

In the third and final stage of training in the Navy Nuclear Pipeline, ETNs are trained for six months at one of four Navy nuclear prototype training units (NPTUs). Three NPTUs are moored training ships (MTS) using a S5W reactor and two S6G reactors located at the Naval Weapons Station in Charleston, SC., and two additional NPTUs are land-based prototype units using a S7G reactor and a S8G reactor located in Saratoga Springs, NY. The curriculum for ETNs at an NPTU includes detailed health physics training, design, operation, and maintenance of electronics systems for the NPTU, nuclear watchstanding procedures, and nuclear casualty procedures. Unlike the first two stages of the Navy Nuclear Pipeline where the curriculum is presented in a typical classroom format, training at an NPTU is self-motivated training where students are required to research different aspects of a nuclear propulsion plant design, operation, or theory and demonstrate this knowledge in an oral interview with a qualified nuclear instructor. Additionally, ETNs must perform graded watches under the instruction of a qualified nuclear instructor where they operate a particular piece of nuclear equipment or respond to a casualty. The culmination of training for an ETN is an oral board where an ETN must demonstrate the knowledge of all procedures, equipment, theory expected for a nuclear reactor operator. Completion of NPTU qualifies an ETN to stand watch on the NPTU or to train to operate nuclear propulsion plants on a nuclear aircraft carrier or submarine. Additionally, it gives the individual the ETN Navy Enlisted Classification (NEC), and the individual is then said to be "nuclear qualified."

Upon completion of the Naval Nuclear Pipeline, most nuclear qualified ETNs are sent to nuclear aircraft carriers or nuclear submarines. On a nuclear-powered aircraft carrier, ETNs are sent to a nuclear training division where they train to qualify to operate the nuclear reactors of the ship in a similar way to NPTU for about six months prior to being sent to a reactor control division. In contrast, on a submarine ETNs are directly assigned to the Reactor Controls division and are directed to qualify different watches incrementally. Due to the smaller number of personnel on a nuclear submarine, ETNs must also cross qualify on several nuclear electrician watches. Since ETNs are required to stand watches, perform maintenance, and train and qualify on additional submarine systems, it is not uncommon for it to take over 12 months for an ETN to become fully qualified as a reactor operator, shutdown reactor operator, and all intermediate watches. Upon subsequent transfer to an NPTU or another nuclear ship, operators are required to re-qualify the same watches in only about 6 months.

Even upon completion of being fully qualified on all ETN watches ("qualified in rate"), additional proficiency and casualty training is required for all ETNs. On a ship this generally includes general Engineering or Reactor Department training, Reactor Controls division training, periodic exams and interviews, monitored maintenance and operations, periodic watch re-qualifications, and monitored tactical or casualty drills.

Usually after an ETN is "fully qualified" the individual is sent to an "in-rate" technical school ETMS where the technician studies electronic troubleshooting and repair on shipboard equipment. Completion of this school allows the technician to be designated with the NEC 3373.

Senior ETNs (typically those who hold the rank of petty officer first class (E-6) or higher) are expected to qualify for senior supervisory watches. Self-motivated training for this includes the detailed operations of all nuclear systems on a ship (not just the ETN specific parts) focusing on the big picture view of nuclear operations and casualty response. The training time required to qualify for senior supervisory watches depends on the individual.

== See also ==
- List of United States Navy ratings
