= Technician =

Professional practitioner of technology and its subclasses

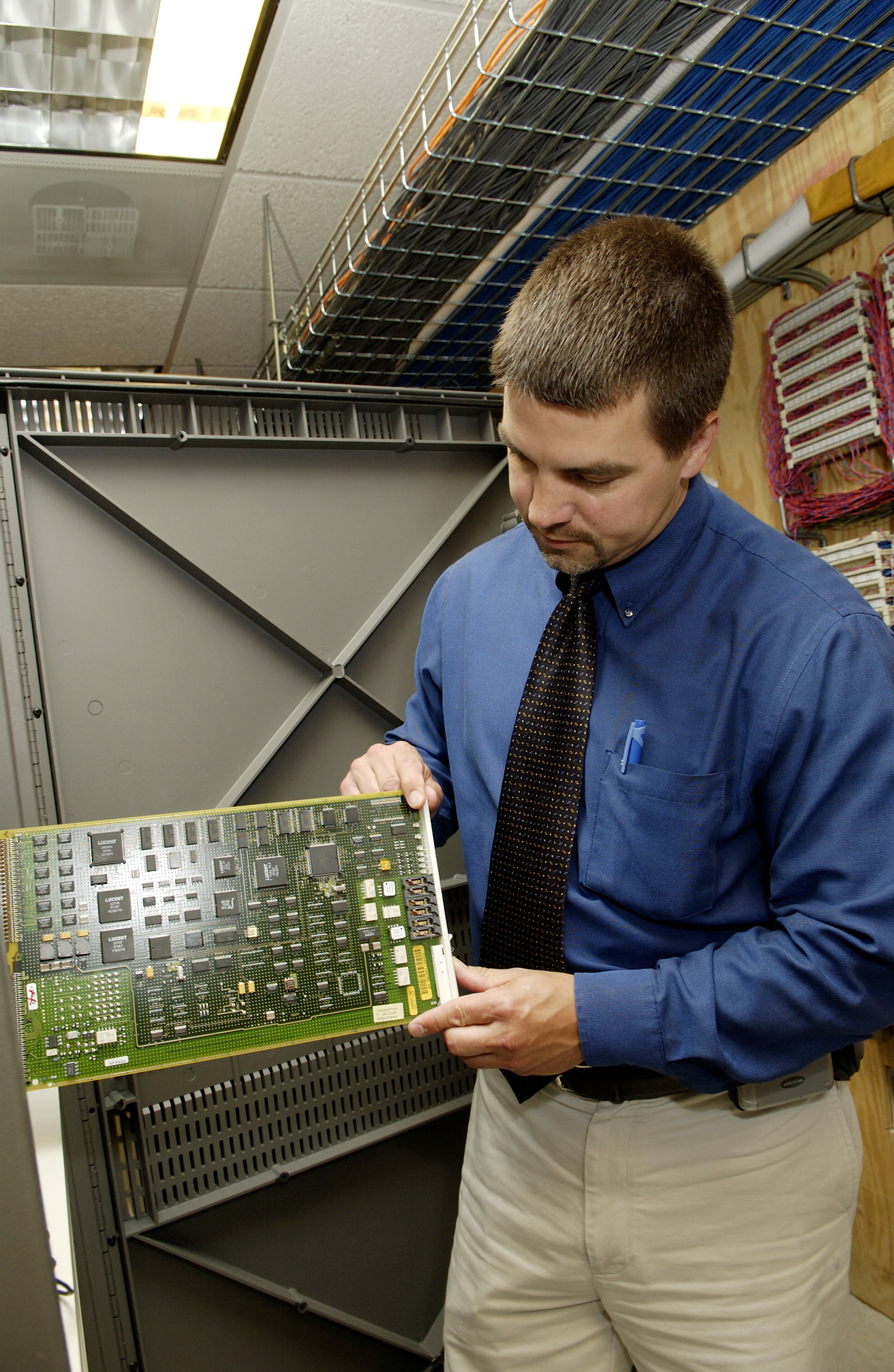
- Systems technician checks a circuit card that delivers telecommunications services to the Cancer Information Service at the National Cancer Institute

Occupation
- Names: Technician
- Occupation type: Profession
- Activity sectors: Applied science

Description
- Competencies: Mathematics, science, design, analysis, critical thinking, ethics, project management, economics, creativity, problem solving
- Education required: Technical education
- Fields of employment: Research and development, industry, business
- Related jobs: Scientist, project manager, inventor

A technician is a worker in a field of technology who is proficient in the relevant skill and technique, with a relatively practical understanding of the theoretical principles.

== Specialisation ==
The term "technician" covers many different specialisations. For example:

- Work safety technician
- Systems technician
- Sciences technician
- Information systems technician
- Engineering technician
- Laboratory technician
- Digital imaging technician
- Machine technician
- Electricity technician
- Electronics technician
- Computer repair technician
- Automation technician
- Pharmacy technician
- Nail technician
- Theatrical technician
- Emergency medical technician

Specific 'technician' roles also exist in the United States Armed Forces. Titles include:

- Data systems technician
- Data processing technician
- Cryptologic technician
- Sonar technician
- Machinery Technician
- Information systems technician (United States Navy)

== Campaigns ==
In the UK, a shortage of skilled technicians in the science, engineering and technology sectors has led to various campaigns to encourage more people to become technicians and to promote the role of technician.

== See also ==
- Grey-collar worker

Technical occupations with partial overlap

- Mechanic
- Engineer
- Repairman

History and education

- Career and Technical Education
- History of technology
- Technical education
