= Bibhuti Roy =

Bangladeshi-German engineer

Prof. (hon.) Bibhuti Roy BSc Eng Ph.D.
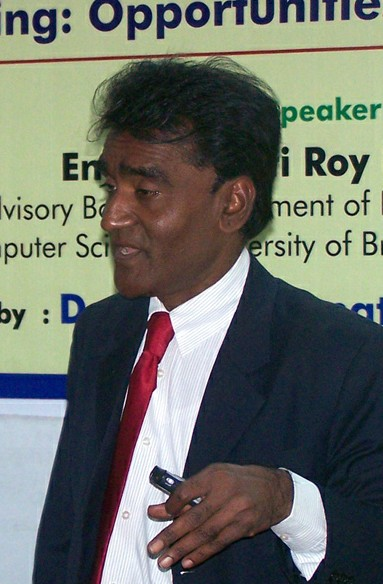
- Roy during a lecture
- Born: East Pakistan (Current Bangladesh)
- Education: University of Rajshahi; University of Bremen (Ph.D.)
- Scientific career
- Fields: Electrical Engineering
- Institutions: University of Bremen, Daffodil International University
- Thesis: Simulation as an action-oriented learning medium in professional education
- Doctoral advisor: Prof. Detlef Gronwald

Bibhuti Roy is an engineer and professor. He is a researcher at the University of Bremen at the ITB in the Department of Computer Science and Engineering and a visiting professor at international universities. His research interests include Computer Based Training, Curriculum development, Biotechnology for sustainable water supply, decentralized energy production and storage and Solar Energy Production Facility and Maintenance.

== Early life ==
Roy was born in East Pakistan. He was a student at University of Rajshahi. He obtained a Bachelor of Science and went on to graduate study at University of Bremen. He received his Ph.D. in engineering after completing a doctoral dissertation, titled "Simulation as an action-oriented learning medium in professional education".

== Career ==
Roy began his career as Technical Assistant for the Vereinigte Flugtechnische Werke (VFW) GmbH in Bremen, designing the wings of fighter jets, later working for Brown, Boveri and Cie (BBC) AG and also as a Technical Draftsman designing electrical circuit diagrams and as a trainee at MBB – ERNO Raumfahrttechnik GmbH to perform feasibility studies on the usage of satellites for educational purposes. He worked as a trainee at the University of Bremen in the department of production engineering to perform feasibility studies on the usage of Electrical Discharge Machines (EDM) in space. He continued to work at the University of Bremen in the field of Concept development, Organization and Management of a practice-oriented Degree Programs for engineers from developing countries.

He was the vice head of department of the Institute Technology and Education (ITB).

Roy was the co-founder of the Bangladesh Entwicklungszentrum in Germany (BEZ) e.V., and founder of the IAQ Bremen, Germany. He was also the co-founder of SUPCONS Ltd. Verden, Germany (an IT Services company that specialized in Portal and Platform development), a founding member of the Interdisciplinary Research Group (IRG) of the Khulna University of Engineering and Technology and later the Khulna University a founding member of the Renewable Energy & Environment Foundation (REEF) in Khulna and a Research advisor to the Daffodil International University in Dhaka.

The most notable projects were a solar training and production facility, constructing hospitals in Bangladesh and creating a sustainable water supply in Africa.
