= Seaman (rank) =

Military rank

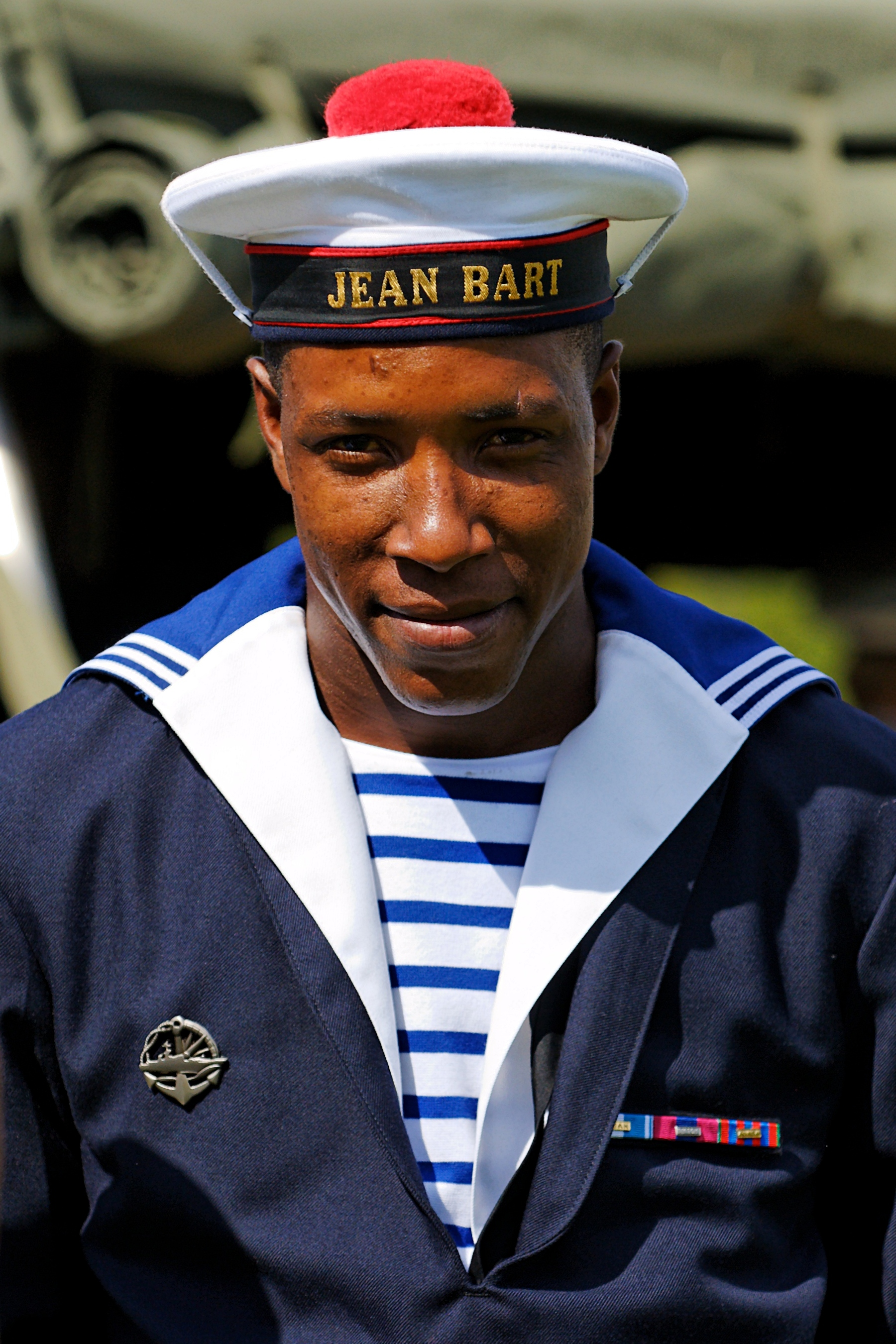
Seaman (matelot) of the French frigate Jean Bart

Seaman is a military rank used in many navies around the world. It is considered a junior enlisted rank and, depending on the navy, it may be a single rank on its own or a name shared by several similarly junior ranks.

In the Commonwealth, it is the lowest rank in the navy, except in Canada where the Royal Canadian Navy now uses the gender-neutral title sailor in English and matelot in French. In the United States, it refers to the three lowest ranks of the U.S. Navy and U.S. Coast Guard. The equivalent of the seaman is the matelot in French-speaking countries, and Matrose in German-speaking countries.

== Australia ==
The Royal Australian Navy features one seaman rank, which is split into two distinct classes. Seaman and seaman* (pronounced "seaman star"), to differentiate between those who have completed their employment training and those who are in training. There is no insignia on a seaman rank slide.

== Canada ==
There are 4 grades of sailor (previously the term "seaman", until it was replaced with "sailor" in August 2020)/matelot in the Royal Canadian Navy:

Sailor third class (previously ordinary seaman) or matelot de troisième classe

Sailor second class (previously able seaman) or matelot de deuxième classe

Sailor first class (previously leading seaman) or matelot de première classe

Master sailor (previously master seaman) or matelot-chef

The rank of master sailor is unique because it was created only for the Canadian Navy. It does not follow the British tradition of other Canadian ranks. It corresponds to the rank of master corporal/caporal-chef.

== France ==
Matelot 2e classe (seaman 2nd class), or apprentice seaman, and matelot breveté (able seaman) are designations of the French Navy. Matelots are colloquially known as "mousses".

Matelot

Matelot breveté (able seaman)

== Estonia ==
Madrus

Madrus is the lowest rank in the Estonian Navy. It is equivalent to OR-1 in NATO

== Germany ==
Shoulder board of a German seaman (matrose)

The German rank of "seaman" (German: Matrose) is the lowest enlisted rank of the German Navy. It is equivalent to OR1 in NATO and is a grade A3 in the pay rules of the Federal Ministry of Defence.

== Greece ==
Badge of a Greek ordinary seaman (ναύτης)

There is one grade of seaman in the Hellenic Navy.

== Indonesia ==
In the Indonesian Navy, this rank is referred to as Kelasi (lit. 'sailor'). There are three levels of this rank in the Indonesian Navy which are: Seaman (Kelasi Dua), Seaman First Class (Kelasi Satu), and Master Seaman (Kelasi Kepala), equivalent to seaman recruit, seaman apprentice, and seaman in the rating system of the US Navy.

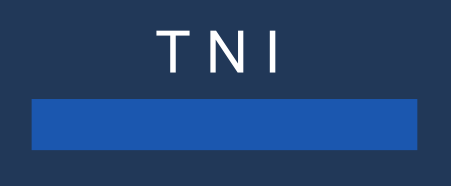
Seaman (Kelasi Dua)

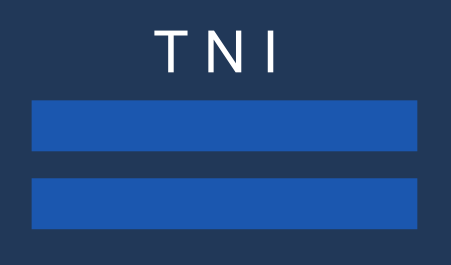
Seaman First Class (Kelasi Satu)

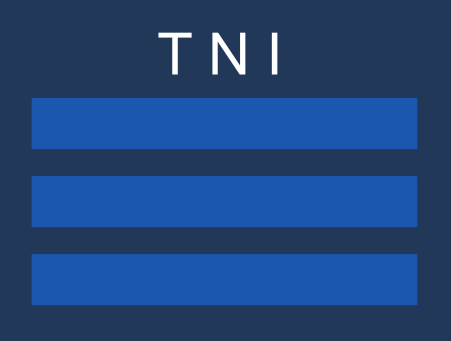
Master Seaman (Kelasi Kepala)

== Ireland ==
The Irish Naval Service rank of "seaman" (Irish: mairnéalach) is the second-lowest enlisted rank, above "recruit."

== Italy ==
The Italian rank of "seaman" (Italian: comune di seconda classe) is the lowest enlisted rank of the Italian Navy equivalent in NATO to OR1.

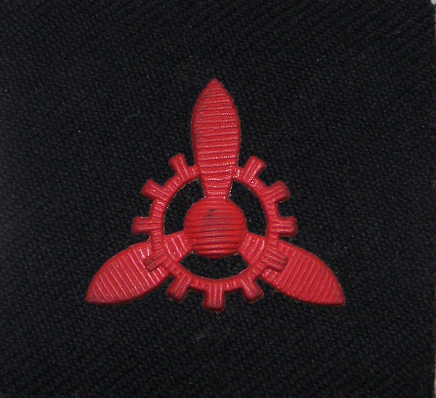
Badge of technics and mechanics

Badge of coxswains

Badge of tracking radar operators

Badge of electro-mechanics

== Japan ==
See Military ranks and insignia of the Japan Self-Defense Forces

== Russia ==
Shoulder board of a Russian seaman (matros)

Much of the Russian military vocabulary was imported, along with military advisers, from the Dutch Republic in the 16th and 17th centuries. The Russian word for "seaman" or "sailor" (Russian: матрос; matros) was borrowed from the Dutch "matroos". In Imperial Russia the most junior naval rank was "seaman 2nd class" (матрос 2-й статьи; matros vtoroi stati). Estonia (Estonian: mаdrus) and Latvia (Latvian: mаtrozis) use closely related loanwords.

The 1917 Revolution led to the term "Red Fleet man" (краснофлотец; krasnoflotets) until 1943, when the Soviet Navy reintroduced the term "seaman" (матрос; matros), along with badges of rank. The Russian Federation inherited the term in 1991, as did several other former Soviet republics, including Ukraine, Azerbaijan and Belarus, with Bulgaria using the same word and the same Cyrillic orthography.

== United Kingdom ==
In the Royal Navy the rate is split into two divisions: AB1 and AB2. The AB2 rating is used for those who have not yet completed their professional taskbooks. The rate of ordinary seaman has been discontinued.

== United States ==
Seaman
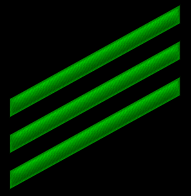
- US Navy Seaman insignia and Airman variation

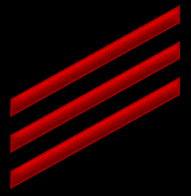
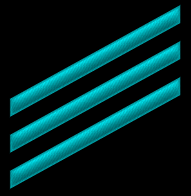
- US Navy Fireman and Constructionman variation

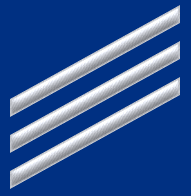
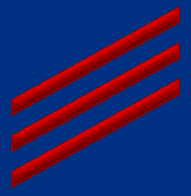
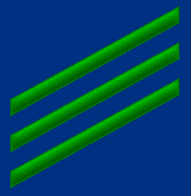
- USCG Seaman, Fireman and Airman Insignia
- Country: United States
- Service branch: United States Navy; United States Coast Guard
- Abbreviation: SN
- Rank group: Enlisted rank
- NATO rank code: OR-3
- Pay grade: E-3
- Next higher rank: Petty officer third class
- Next lower rank: Seaman apprentice
- Equivalent ranks: Private first class Army; Lance corporal USMC; Airman first class USAF; Specialist 3 USSF

Related articles
- History: Seaman first class

Seaman (SN) is the third enlisted rank from the bottom in the U.S. Navy and U.S. Coast Guard, ranking above seaman apprentice and below petty officer third class. This naval rank was formerly called seaman first class. The rank is also used in United States Naval Sea Cadet Corps, a naval-themed uniformed youth program under the sponsorship of the Navy League of the United States.

The actual title and insignia for an E-3 varies based on the job rating to which the member will ultimately be assigned.

- Those in the general deck, technical, weapons and administrative groups (with the exception of the aviation administration men) are called "seamen" (SN) and they represent the largest group of Navy and Coast Guard personnel in pay grades E-3 and below. They wear white stripes on their blue uniforms (USN and USCG), and navy blue (black) stripes on their white uniforms (USN only).
- Those in the medical group are now called "hospitalmen" (HN). In October 2005, the USN dental technician (DT) rating was merged into the hospital corpsman (HM) rating, eliminating the "dentalman" title for E-3 and below. Those who once held the rate of "dentalman" have become "hospitalmen". They wear white stripes on their blue uniforms, and navy blue stripes on their white uniforms. After the completion of their "A" school, they wear a caduceus of the same color as the stripes on their uniforms. On their combat uniforms, a hospitalman wears their caduceus on the tab of their left collar tab. This rating was previously called pharmacist's mate (PHM) and HMs are colloquially referred to as "corpsman" in the naval service. Hospitalmen exist only in the U.S. Navy; their equivalent in the U.S. Coast Guard is the health services technician (HS), which is sourced from seamen in that service's administrative and scientific group.
- Those in the shipboard engineering and hull group, comprising conventional (USN + USCG) and nuclear (USN only) powerplants and propulsion, as well as the hull maintenance area, are called "firemen" (FN). They wear red stripes on both their USN and USCG blue uniforms and, in the case of the Navy, white uniforms.
- Those in the aviation group of the Navy and Coast Guard are called "airmen" (AN), and they wear green stripes on blue uniforms (USN + USCG) and white uniforms (USN only).
- Enlisted personnel in the construction group, which primarily populates the U.S. Navy's civil engineering construction battalions (i.e., Seabees), are called "constructionmen" (CN) and they wear light blue stripes on both their blue and white uniforms. Constructionmen are unique to the U.S. Navy; there is no U.S. Coast Guard equivalent.

No such stripes for E-1, E-2 or E-3 are authorized to be worn on working uniforms, e.g., navy work uniform, USCG operational dress uniform, coveralls, utility wear, flight suits, hospital and clinic garb, diving suits, etc. However, sailors with the pay grade of E-2 or E-3 are permitted to wear silver-anodized collar devices on their service uniforms.

Some sailors and Coast Guardsmen receive a rating following completion of a military technical training course for that particular rating known as an "A" school. Other sailors and Coast Guardsmen who have completed the requirements to be assigned a rating and have been accepted by the Navy Personnel Command/Bureau of Naval Personnel (USN) or the Coast Guard Personnel Service Center Command (USCG) as holding that rating (a process called "striking") are called "designated strikers", and are referred to by their full rate and rating in formal communications (i.e., machinist's mate fireman (MMFN), as opposed to simply fireman (FN)), though the rating is often left off in informal communications. Those who have not officially been assigned to a rating are officially referred to as "undesignated" or "non-rates." Once selected for a particular rating of their choice they become eligible for advancement in that community.

== Venezuela ==
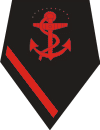
Venezuelan insignia

The rank is used by the National Bolivarian Armed Forces of Venezuela.

== See also ==
- Seaman (Admiralty Law)
- Comparative military ranks
- List of United States Coast Guard ratings
- United States Coast Guard enlisted rate insignia
- United States Coast Guard officer rank insignia
- United States Navy enlisted rates
