= Autumn Sandeen =

American activist

- Born: Northridge, California, U.S.
- Military career
- Allegiance: United States
- Branch: United States Navy
- Service years: 1980–2000
- Rank: Fire Controlman
- Other work: Transgender activist, blogger

Autumn Sandeen is a transgender activist and US Navy veteran. In 2013, she became the first US service member to succeed in petitioning the Defense Department to publicly change her gender identification on all her military records.

== Early life ==
Sandeen was born Stephen Mark Sandeen in Northridge, California. Her father is Jack Sandeen, a film and television costumer and later the wardrobe department head at Walt Disney Studios. At age 14, Sandeen became aware of her own gender dysphoria, as she felt her developing body did not match her gender identity.

== Navy service ==
Sandeen served as a fire controlman in the US Navy from 1980 to 2000. During her service, Sandeen primarily focused on the maintenance of equipment used in the aiming and firing of guns and missiles. She worked in bases throughout the Northern Hemisphere and served on four ships. She was discharged with a 100% disability rating (service-related).

== Gender transition ==
In the late 1990s, Sandeen began seriously considering transitioning after she left the Navy. She started the process in February 2003 and officially took on the first name Autumn in July 2003.

Sandeen has worked to change all official records – including those pertaining to her retirement pay and retirement services – to match her female gender identity. In 2011, she collaborated with the National Center for Transgender Equality to construct a methodology for transsexual veterans to change their gender identification in Veterans Administration databases. In 2012, she was issued a new birth certificate that acknowledged her female identity.

The Department of Defense was the last governmental body that still recorded Sandeen's gender as male. Sandeen worked with OutServe-SLDN to determine the required documentation for changing one's gender in Department of Defense databases. Sandeen's change established a procedure for transgender veterans who have completed reassignment surgery to alter their gender identity on Pentagon records. She received a letter officially confirming her identification as female in Department of Defense records effective April 12, 2013. GLAAD hailed Sandeen as the first service member to publicly change her gender identification under the Department of Defense.

== Transgender activism ==
Sandeen served as board member within the Transgender Advocacy and Services Center San Diego from 2006 to 2008.

She was arrested twice in 2010 for handcuffing herself to the White House fence in protest of Don't Ask Don't Tell. Upon release, Sandeen spoke out about the transphobic mistreatment she experienced while in prison.

Sandeen currently blogs for The Transadvocate. She lives in San Diego, California.
