= List of United States Coast Guard enlisted ranks =

These charts represents the United States Coast Guard enlisted rank insignia. Ranks are used to describe an enlisted sailor's pay-grade. Ranks are not to be confused with "ratings", which describe the Coast Guard's enlisted occupations. (The rating symbol of crossed anchors depicted in the graphics below are for a boatswain's mate.)

== E-1 to E-3 ==
Junior enlisted personnel are broken up into three definable groups with colored insignia stripes designating with which group they belong. A specialty mark may be worn above the rank insignia, which denotes training in a particular field: either as an apprentice (one that is in search of a rating to join), or as a designated striker (one that has found a rating but is not yet a petty officer). The Coast Guardsman is addressed by his group designation, if known (e.g. Fireman Jones, Airman Apprentice Smith); by the generic appellation "seaman"; or by her striker designation (SNBM Watson, FNMK Johnson). Personnel who are assigned to the College Student Pre-Commissioning Initiative (CSPI) Scholarship Program hold the special E-3 rank of officer trainee (OT).

Sleeve insignia	Collar device	Rank title	U.S. DoD Pay grade	Abbreviation	NATO code
	None	Seaman recruit	E-1	SR	OR-1
	None	Seaman apprentice	E-2	SA	OR-2
	None	Fireman apprentice	E-2	FA	OR-2
	None	Airman apprentice	E-2	AA	OR-2
	None	Seaman	E-3	SN	OR-3
	None	Fireman	E-3	FN	OR-3
	None	Airman	E-3	AM	OR-3
None		Officer trainee	E-3	OT	OR-3

== E-4 to E-6 ==
E-4 to E-6 are considered to be non-commissioned officers (NCOs), and are specifically called petty officers in the Coast Guard. Their sleeve insignia is a perched eagle with spread wings (also referred to as a "crow") atop a rating mark (a symbol denoting their job category), with red chevron(s) denoting their relative rank below. The Coast Guard does not follow the Navy's practice of awarding gold chevrons for twelve years of good conduct, rather all petty officer rank chevrons and service hash marks are red, whereas gold is reserved for chief petty officers. However, the rank insignia worn on collars have yellow chevrons.

Onboard cutters, the first class petty officers become members of the First Class Mess which serves as a recognition of their status at the top of the junior enlisted ranks. This manifests itself on small cutters as a few reserved tables in the galley, but may be a separate seating area or space on board a large cutter. The food is the same as that in the galley from which the other junior ranks eat. It also is a precursor to the Chief's mess. All ranks from petty officer third class and above (Including warrant and commissioned officers) also have the ability to perform an arrest while on duty.

Sleeve insignia	Collar device	Rank title	U.S. DoD Pay grade	Abbreviation	NATO code
		Petty officer third class	E-4	PO3	OR-4
		Petty officer second class	E-5	PO2	OR-5
		Petty officer first class	E-6	PO1	OR-6

== E-7 to E-9 ==
E-7 to E-9 are still considered NCOs, but are considered a separate community within the Coast Guard, much like the U.S. Navy. They have separate berthing and dining facilities (where feasible). They serve as the day to day leaders and managers of the enlisted workforce, and routinely serve in command cadre positions. Their dress blue insignia consists of a perched eagle with spread wings atop a rating mark, with three gold chevrons and one "rocker" above; inverted five-point stars above the crow denote the rank of senior chief (one star) or master chief (two stars). However, all other uniforms use the fouled anchor device to denote rank. It consists of a fouled anchor with the Coast Guard Shield (in silver) superimposed, with stars above the anchor to indicate higher paygrades, similar to the dress blue insignia.

The proper form of address to a chief petty officer is simply "Chief". In the U.S. Coast Guard, the Chief is specifically tasked in writing with the duty of training junior officers (ensign, lieutenant (j.g.), lieutenant, and lieutenant commander). This is one of the major differences between Chiefs in the Coast Guard and their counterparts in the Army, Marine Corps, and Air Force.

Sleeve insignia	Collar device	Rank title	U.S. DoD Pay grade	Abbreviation	NATO code
		Chief petty officer	E-7	CPO	OR-7
		Senior chief petty officer	E-8	SCPO	OR-8
		Master chief petty officer	E-9	MCPO	OR-9

== Command master chief ==
Upon obtaining the rank of master chief petty officer, the service member may choose to further their career by becoming a command master chief (CMC). These personnel are considered to be the senior-most enlisted servicemember within their command, and are the special assistant to the commanding officer in all matters pertaining to the health, welfare, job satisfaction, morale, utilization, advancement, and training of the command's enlisted personnel. In total, the USCG has 27 CMCs and 7 gold badge CMCs. As of April 2020, these 7 are:

- MCPOCG of the Coast Guard Reserve (MCPO-CGR)
- Deputy MCPOCG
- CMC Deputy Commandant for Missions Support
- CMC, Atlantic Area
- CMC, Atlantic Area Reserve
- CMC, Pacific Area
- CMC, Pacific Area Reserve

Sleeve insignia	Collar device	Rank title	U.S. DoD Pay grade	Abbreviation	NATO code
		Command master chief petty officer	E-9	CMC	OR-9
		Gold badge master chief petty officer	E-9	CMC	OR-9

== Master Chief Petty Officer of the Coast Guard ==
The Master Chief Petty Officer of the Coast Guard (MCPOCG) is the senior enlisted person in the Coast Guard. The MCPOCG serves as the senior enlisted leader of the Coast Guard, and as an advisor to the Commandant of the Coast Guard in matters dealing with enlisted personnel and their families. The MCPOCG is also an advisor to the many boards dealing with enlisted personnel issues; may be called upon to testify on enlisted personnel issues before Congress; and maintains a liaison with enlisted spouse organizations.

Sleeve insignia	Collar device	Rank title	US DoD Pay grade	Abbreviation	NATO code
		Master Chief Petty Officer of the Coast Guard	Special grade	MCPOCG	OR-9

== See also ==
- United States Coast Guard officer rank insignia
- List of United States Coast Guard ratings
