= Information systems technician (United States Navy) =

Occupational rating in the U.S. Navy and Coast Guard

Information Systems Technician United States Navy
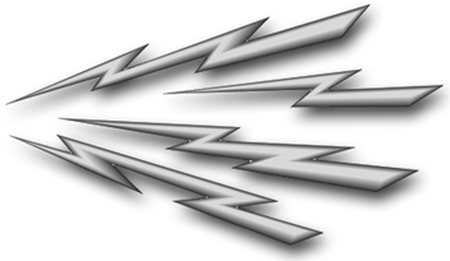
- Rating insignia
- Issued by: United States Navy
- Type: Enlisted rating
- Abbreviation: IT (Surface), ITS (Submarine)
- Specialty: Technical

Information systems technician United States Coast Guard
- Rating insignia
- Issued by: United States Coast Guard
- Type: Enlisted rating
- Abbreviation: IT
- Specialty: Technical

Information systems technician (IT) is a rating for United States Navy and United States Coast Guard enlisted personnel, specializing in communications technology. Information systems technician submarines (ITS) is a rating for U.S. Navy submariners. The Information systems technician (IT) rating corresponds to the new Navy Occupational Specialty (NOS) code B460 while the information systems technician submarines (ITS) rating corresponds to NOS code C260.

Information systems technician is a U.S. Navy and Coast Guard specific job, also known as an enlisted rating (often called MOS by other armed services). The other U.S. Armed Forces have similar positions, but with different titles utilized (information technology specialist in the U.S. Army, data network specialist in the U.S. Marine Corps)

Information systems technicians design, install, operate, and maintain state-of-the-art information systems. This technology includes local and wide area networks, mainframe, mini and microcomputer systems and associated peripheral devices. They also write programs to handle the collection, manipulation and distribution of data for a wide variety of applications and requirements. They perform the functions of a computer system analyst, operate telecommunications systems including automated networks and the full spectrum of data links and circuits.

The IT rating is one of the most diverse ratings in the US Navy. The IT rating was created in 1999 after the 1998 merger of two previous Navy ratings - radioman (RM) and data processing technician (DP). A third rating, cryptologic technician communications (CTO) merged with IT in October, 2005. In February 2010, the IT rating was incorporated into the Information Dominance Corps.

== Schooling ==
IT candidates attend "A" school at Corry Station in Pensacola, Florida. Schooling is instructor led, using a computer-based learning system. The schooling can also be taught digitally by the software Acuitus, where you are self paced and learn from modules. The Marine radio operator and data systems school is located at MCESS 29 Palms, California and Army computer systems school is located at Fort Gordon, Georgia.

== History of the IT rating ==
The combining of ratings in the Navy has been in place since 1990. There were many combination of both engineering and operation ratings to best fit the class of ship. Many duties of the IT rating are still evolving. The radioman (RM) and data processing technician (DP) ratings were merged in November 1998, keeping the radioman name. In November 1999 the rating was re-designated information systems technician. Both radiomen and data processing technicians in the Navy had to undergo general rate training and take a computer-based exam in order to be designated under the new IT rating (the radiomen found themselves bound to a serious learning curve because they had to learn every single aspect from the data processing technician rating) whereas to the data processing technicians, most of them already had a general knowledge in basic computer fundamentals and maintenance. In 1996 the submarine force merged radioman with electronics technicians and electronic warfare specialist.

The ITS rating for submarines was created in December 2010.

The Coast Guard radioman (RM) rating was renamed telecommunications specialist (TC) in 1995, which split in 2003 to make up the information system technician (IT) and operations specialist (OS) ratings. The Coast Guard telephone technician (TT) rating was also merged into the IT rating in 2003; the TT rating device of a telephone handset over the globe became the rating device for the Coast Guard IT rating.

== Warfare qualifications ==
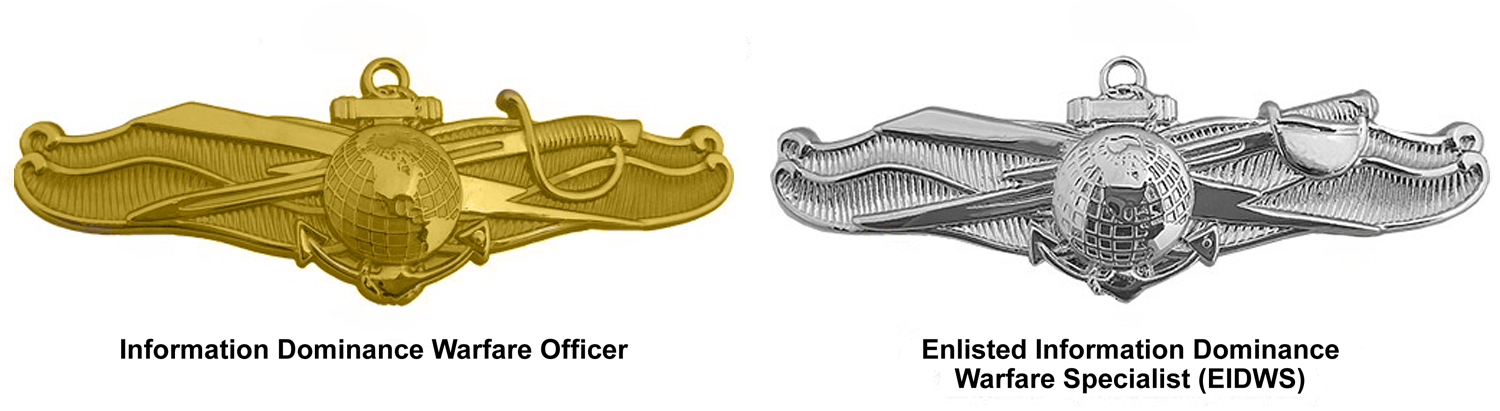
Navy Information Dominance Corps warfare device

While there is a community-specific Information Dominance Corps warfare qualification for ITS, the IT rating is one of the few ratings that can qualify in all aspects of naval warfare, such as:

- Aircrew - responsible for the operation, maintenance, and troubleshooting of the radios, computers, antennas, networking, and cryptographic equipment on TACAMO and AWACS missions.
- Seabee
- Surface warfare - responsible for maintaining communication links, troubleshooting radio and computer equipment, satellite communications, cryptographic equipment, and is responsible for the administration of the shipboard LAN, WAN links, and servers/networking equipment.
- Expeditionary Warfare
- Fleet Marine Force - responsible for landing after the Marines have secured an area to set up fleet communications, networking, and cryptographic equipment to support joint communications within a battlefield environment. This includes configuring JWICS, Defense Message System, and AUTODIN communications in order for combatants to maintain command communications and control superiority.
- Submarines

== See also ==
- List of United States Navy ratings
