= Data systems technician =

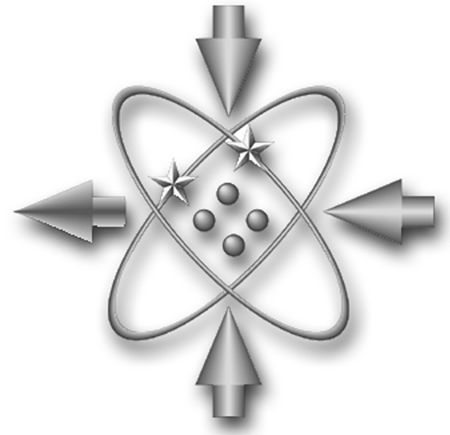
The rating badge for data systems technician, a helium atom with input/output arrows.

The United States Navy occupational rating of data systems technician (abbreviated as DS) was a designation given by the Bureau of Naval Personnel (BUPERS) to enlisted members who satisfactorily complete initial data systems technician "A" school training. The primary training location for the DS rating was Combat System Technical Schools Command (CSTSC) at Mare Island Vallejo, CA.

It was established in 1961 and merged into the electronics technician and fire controlman ratings on 1 October 1998.

DSs are electronics technicians who specialize in naval tactical data system computer systems including: digital computers, video processors, tape units, buffers, key sets, digital-display equipment, data-link terminal sets and related equipment. DSs also specialized in the maintenance of shipboard ADP systems and associated peripheral equipment including, but not limited to, card reader/punch/interpreter, magnetic tape and disk drives and various printers. They clean, maintain, lubricate, calibrate and adjust equipment. DSs run operational tests, diagnose problems, make routine repairs and evaluate newly installed parts and systems units.

== See also ==
- List of United States Navy ratings
