= S7G reactor =

Nuclear reactor for U.S. Navy warships

The S7G reactor was a prototype naval reactor designed for the United States Navy to provide electricity generation and propulsion on warships. The S7G designation stands for:

- S = Submarine platform
- 7 = Seventh reactor designed by the contractor
- G = General Electric was the contracted designer

This prototype design was a land-based nuclear reactor that did not use control rods. It was tested in the late 1970s and early 1980s at the Modifications and Additions to a Reactor Facility (MARF) plant located at the Knolls Atomic Power Laboratory's Kesselring Site in Ballston Spa, New York. It consisted of an experimental reactor core installed in a modified S5W reactor plant.

== Design and operation ==
Instead of the movable hafnium-based control rods used in all of the other United States Naval reactors, reactivity in the S7G core was controlled by stationary gadolinium-clad tubes partially filled with water. Water could be pumped from the portion of the tube inside the core up to a reservoir above the core, or allowed to flow back down into the tube. A higher water level in the tube slowed more neutrons in the core, causing more neutron capture by the gadolinium tube cladding rather than by the uranium fuel, thus lowering the power level.

The system was configured with the pump running continually to keep the water level low; on loss of electrical power, all of the water would flow back into the tube, shutting down the reactor. As with all small pressurized water reactors, the design also had the advantage of negative feedback: an increase in reactor power caused the water to expand, leading to reduced thermalization of neutrons and lowering absorption by the fuel, therefore lowering the power. Thus, changes in the average coolant temperature, notably from the steam demand of engine throttles, naturally maintains reactor power without intervention from a reactor operator.

The S7G reactor was never used on a ship. In the late 1980s the S7G core was replaced with the experimental DMC (Developmental Materials Core)
