= Concept development and experimentation =

Concept development and experimentation (CD&E) is the application of the structure and methods of experimental science to the challenge of developing future military capability.

CD&E is a forward-looking process for developing and evaluating new concepts, before committing extensive resources. It helps identify the best solution not only from a technical perspective, but also for possible solutions for challenges involving doctrine, organization, training, and material to achieve significant advances in future operations.

Developing and identifying future-oriented concepts allows one to:

- test their validity/feasibility;
- take advantage of other studies/experiments conducted and
- save resources and avoid duplication.

The potential impacts on interoperability and increased capabilities by emerging concepts must be captured by some process and exploited.

Concept development gives broad and sometimes ill-defined ideas a chance to be examined by groups of experts in a logical process. These ideas can come from different sources: e.g. ministry of defense, industry, servicemen organizations or partners. They can be generated by staff processes, operational experience, formal analytical work, or published proposals. There need be no boundaries on the types of ideas that enter the concept development process, although some simpler ones that modify techniques or procedures might be ‘fast-tracked’ into practice because they are intuitively sound.

Typically, promising ideas with a broader scope are explored and refined through workshops and larger seminars to the point where more mature concepts are formed. These concepts are further debated in committees or working groups and, if accepted, are submitted to the experimental process.

== Kinds of experiments ==
Different kinds of experiments can be conducted:

- Discovery experiments [a questionable scientific practice] reveal more details of the scrutinized problem.
- Hypothesis experiments validate specific thesis and
- Demonstration experiments provide an insight into the realization of the a concept.

Once validated and accepted, concepts are incorporated into military organizations – for example, through doctrine and capability development processes.

== Literature ==
- NATO Code of Best Practice for C2 Assessment, CCRP Publication Series, 2002 ()
- Alberts, David S., Hayes, Richard E: Code of Best Practice for Experimentation, CCRP Publication Series, 2002 ()
- Alberts, David S., Hayes, Richard E: Campaigns of Experimentation, CCRP Publication Series, 2005 ()
- Guide for Understanding and Implementing Defense Experimentation (GUIDEx), The Technical Cooperation Program, 2006, () GUIDEx Book () GUIDEx Pocketbook () GUIDEx Triptych ()
