= Aviation Maintenance Technician =

Aviation Maintenance Technicians (AMT) are an enlisted rating of the United States Coast Guard. They inspect, service, maintain, troubleshoot and repair aircraft engines, auxiliary power units, propellers, rotor systems, power train systems, and associated airframe and systems-specific electrical components. They service, maintain and repair aircraft fuselages; wings; rotor blades; fixed and movable flight control surfaces; and also bleed aircraft air, hydraulic and fuel systems. AMTs fill aircrew positions such as flight engineer, flight mechanic, loadmaster, dropmaster, Aircraft Ground Handling, Flight Deck Handling, sensor-systems operator and basic aircrewman.

== Duties ==
AMTs are stationed at Coast Guard Air Stations throughout the United States and Puerto Rico. AMTs maintain Lockheed HC-130, HC-27J Spartan, CASA HC-144A Ocean Sentry, Sikorsky MH-60 Jayhawk and Eurocopter HH-65 Dolphin aircraft.

== Training ==
The five-month course covers basic aircraft-maintenance fundamentals. Other advanced courses cover specific aircraft systems and provide troubleshooting skills. The advanced courses are taught at the Aviation Technical Training Centers in Elizabeth City, North Carolina, for all but the HC-130 aircraft. The Coast Guard also uses commercial training for advanced courses. An AMT may apply for the Aviation Maintenance Technology Program, which provides personnel with the knowledge and skills necessary to fill billets requiring a high level of technical expertise. The program provides up to two years of full-time college attendance to achieve a minimum of an associate degree in aeronautical technology.

== Qualifications ==
Algebra, geometry, electronics and machine shop are typical courses for those seeking a rating as an AMT. Candidates must pass a flight physical and qualify for a security clearance.
