= Science technician =

Science technician is a profession involving working as a member of support staff in any science disciplines. The Science Council defines a technician as “a person who is skilled in the use of particular techniques and procedures to solve practical problems, often in ways that require considerable ingenuity and creativity. Technicians typically work with complex instruments and equipment, and require specialised training, as well as considerable practical experience, in order to do their job effectively”.

Science technicians are frequently based in laboratories, but they also perform roles in workshops, studios, the field, or in any location where scientific work is being carried out. As a group, science technicians have been referred to as "Invisible"; members of the scientific workforce whose role in the process for forming new scientific knowledge has been poorly acknowledged and insufficiently studied. However, more recently their role has been studied in some detail.

== Profession ==
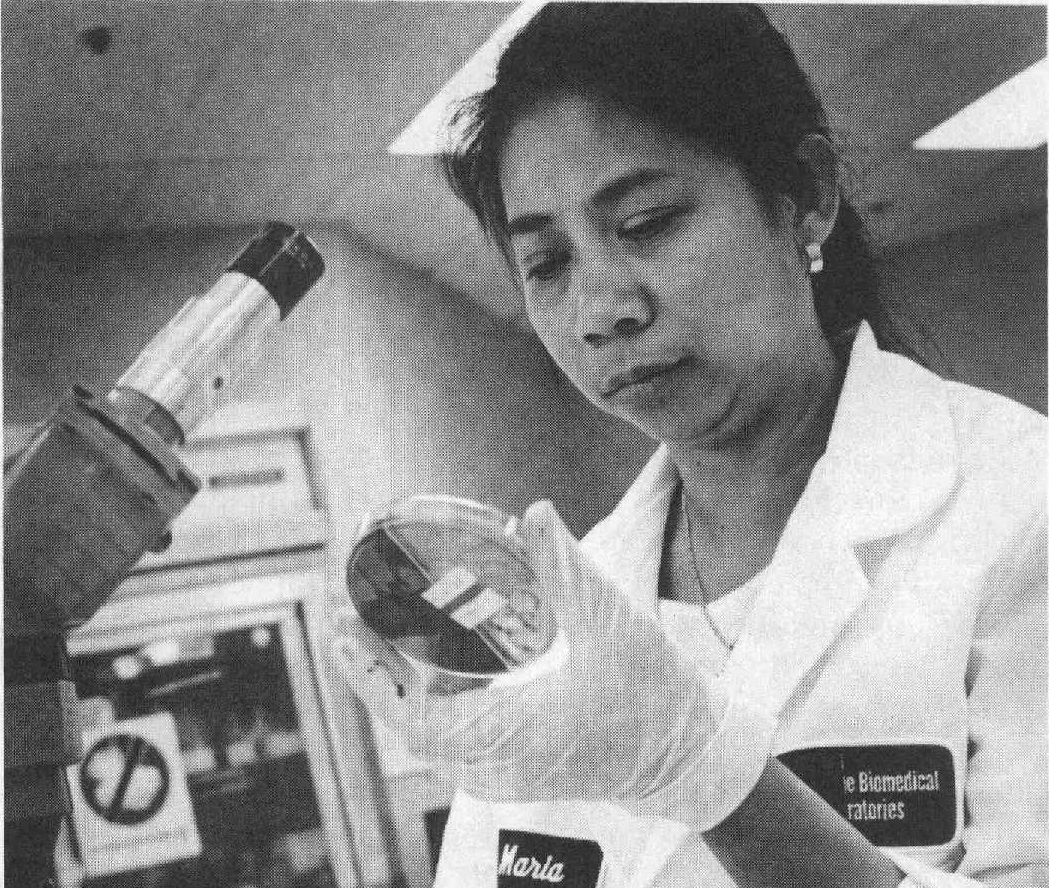
A biomedical science technician reviewing a biplate. (1992)

Professional training for science technicians varies between countries. In Germany, where science technicians are a subset of the "technical assistant" class of professions, state-certified technician training is a vocational training that lasts between two and three years. It allows specializations in, for instance, physics, chemistry, pharmacy, medicine and computer science, among others.

In the UK, historically, Science technicians have been able to either join the professional body relating to the scientific field in which they work (for example, the Royal Society of Chemistry or the Institute of Physics) or the Institute of Science and Technology which is a professional organisation specifically for technical and specialist staff. Via a professional body or the Science Council Science technicians have been able to gain professional registration as a chartered scientist (CSci) or Registered Scientist (RSci). Since 2011, Science technicians have also been able to gain status as Registered Science Technicians (RSciTech).

There are various awards that can be awarded for science technicians including the Gratnells Science Technician of the Year award.
