= Fire controlman =

United States Navy occupational rating

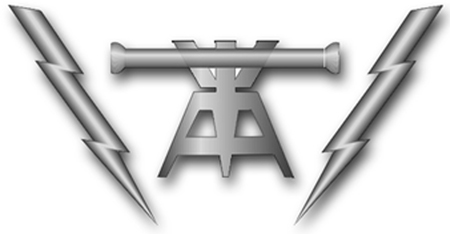
- Rating insignia
- Issued by: United States Navy
- Type: Enlisted rating
- Abbreviation: FC
- Specialty: Weapons

Fire controlman (abbreviated as FC) is a United States Navy occupational rating. Often confused with being fireman on board a ship, FCs actually operate advanced weapons systems, whereas Damage Controlman (DC) are actually the shipboard firefighters.

Fire controlmen provide system employment recommendations; perform organizational and intermediate maintenance on digital computer equipment, subsystems, and systems; operate and maintain combat and weapons direction systems, surface-to-air and surface-to-surface missile systems, and gun fire control systems at the organizational and intermediate level; inspect, test, align, and repair micro/minicomputers and associated peripheral equipment, data conversion units, data display equipment, data link terminal equipment, print devices, and system related equipment; make analysis for detailed systems, computer programs, electronics, and electronic casualty control; and operate associated built-in and external test equipment; load, initialize, and run preprogrammed diagnostic, performance and testing routines for digital computer equipment, digital subsystems, digital systems, and overall combat systems.

Fire controlmen attend apprentice technical training and "A"-School at Naval Station Great Lakes; this course is roughly 8 months long followed then by a "C"-school, based on one of the systems described below, which vary in length from 4 months to 8 months.

FCs typically operate weapon systems on-board surface combatant ships. They are trained in the repair, maintenance, operation and employment of weapons such as the Tomahawk missile system, the close-in weapons system, the 5"/54 caliber Mark 45 gun weapon system and its associated MK86 or MK160 gun fire control system, the MK92 gun fire control system (on frigates) the Sea Sparrow missile system, and the Harpoon missile systems. These include their associated computer and sensor packages. Their job is somewhat unusual in that they are trained to troubleshoot and repair their systems, as well as operate them. These responsibilities are typically split up between different ratings for various types of electronic equipment.

In essence, they operate the weapons sensors and tracking devices, from first detection through firing the weapons, to defend the ship against tactical threats or to make offensive strikes against hostile targets.

Another area of responsibility for FCs is the Aegis weapon system, which includes one of the most powerful air-search sea-based radars, the SPY-1, as well the MK99 fire control system, used for terminal guidance of Standard missiles, and the Aegis computer suite.

== History ==
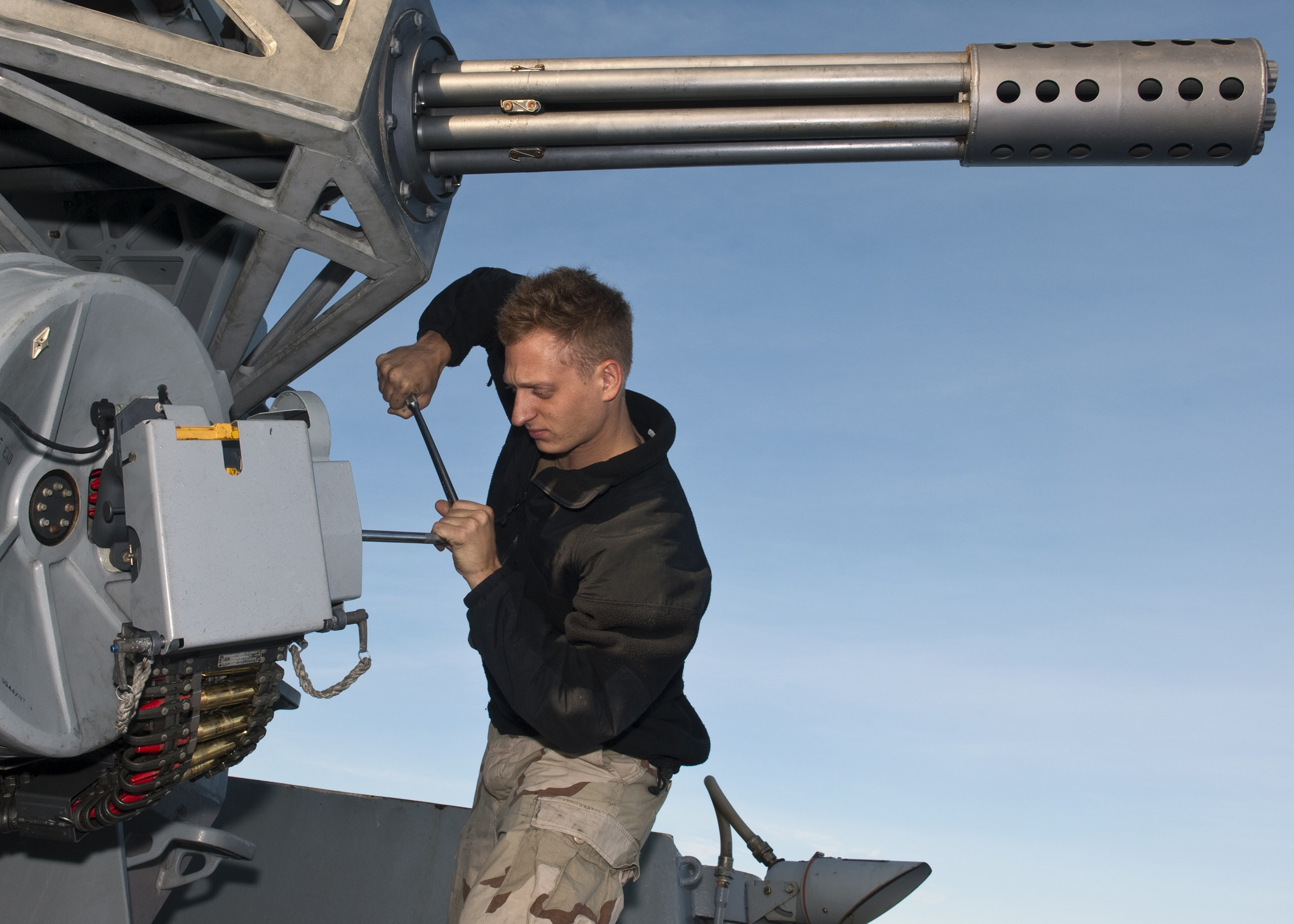
Fire Controlman 2nd Class Anthony Ferretti performs maintenance on a close-in weapon system for a live-fire exercise aboard the guided-missile destroyer USS Arleigh Burke

According to the official history documented by the U.S. Navy, the fire controlman rating was established in 1941, when it was split off from the gunner's mate rating. It was actually created much earlier than this, as US Navy Muster Reports account for FCs well before then. It is commonly believed that the rate came into existence at some point in the 1920s. Fire controlmen were highly skilled technicians responsible for the operation of various forms of range finding gear, as well as the solving of ballistics calculations to control the firing of the ship's guns. These skills were employed initially for naval gunfire support and surface combat, but during World War II, their responsibilities expanded into anti-aircraft warfare as well.

In 1957, as various electronics such as tracking radars and computers became more widespread, the fire controlman rating was merged into the fire control technician (FT) rating which had been created in 1948, with specific sub-specialties for gunnery (FTG), missiles (FTM), and submarines (FTU). Later, the FTU designation was split into two specific sub-specialties for torpedoes (FTG) and ballistic missiles (FTB).

In 1985, the Navy re-established the fire controlman rating to separate those sailors in the surface FTG and FTM sub-specialties from those assigned to submarines, with the latter retaining the fire control technician rating.

In 1998, the Navy merged certain sailors from the data systems technician (DS) rating into the fire controlman rating.

In 2017, the Navy established a new sub-specialty, Fire Controlman Aegis (FCA) for sailors who operated and maintained aegis equipment, with an advancement exam separate from the general Fire Controlman rating.

The fire controlman rating insignia is a coincidence or stereoscopic rangefinder, with two lightning bolts (called "sparks") signifying the technical skills required. The lightning bolts were introduced when the rate was re-established in 1985.

FCs maintain the control systems used in aiming and firing weapons on all equipped ships. Complex computers, electronics, and electrical and hydraulic equipment are required to ensure the accuracy of guided missile, surface, and anti-aircraft fire control systems. FCs are responsible for the operation, routine care, and repair of this equipment, which includes radars, computers, weapons-direction equipment, target-designation systems, gyroscopes, and rangefinders.

== The Fire Controlman's Creed ==
I am a Fire Controlman, a Petty Officer of the United States Navy. My work is the operation and maintenance of the weapons aboard the fighting ships of the Navy.

I am required to know, operate, and maintain intricate scientific precision instruments. To do this, I must have a thorough knowledge of the work of an Electronics Technician, Machinist's Mate, Gunner's Mate, Machinery Repairman, Operations Specialist, and Engineman.

My aim in life is to know my job; to know everything that pertains to practical gunnery and ordnance.

As long as there is any operation or piece of equipment I do not fully understand, my job is not complete.

In the event of war, I must be prepared for any emergency.

I must be capable of and competent to fill my station, or perform any operation in the weapons department of my ship; to assume command of, spot, or control the fire of any battery.

In addition to being competent to perform any operation, I will strive to know my maintenance duties so well that I may maintain the battle efficiency of my ship, even on a darkened ship, under enemy fire.

This to the end ... that the ship may fight as long as she is afloat!

== See also ==
- List of United States Navy ratings that work for FCs
