= Radioman =

US Navy and US Coast Guard rating for communication personnel

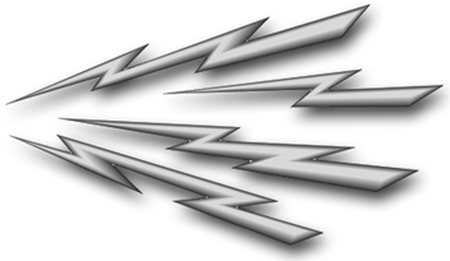
- Rating insignia
- Issued by: United States Navy
- Type: Enlisted rating
- Abbreviation: RM
- Specialty: Technical

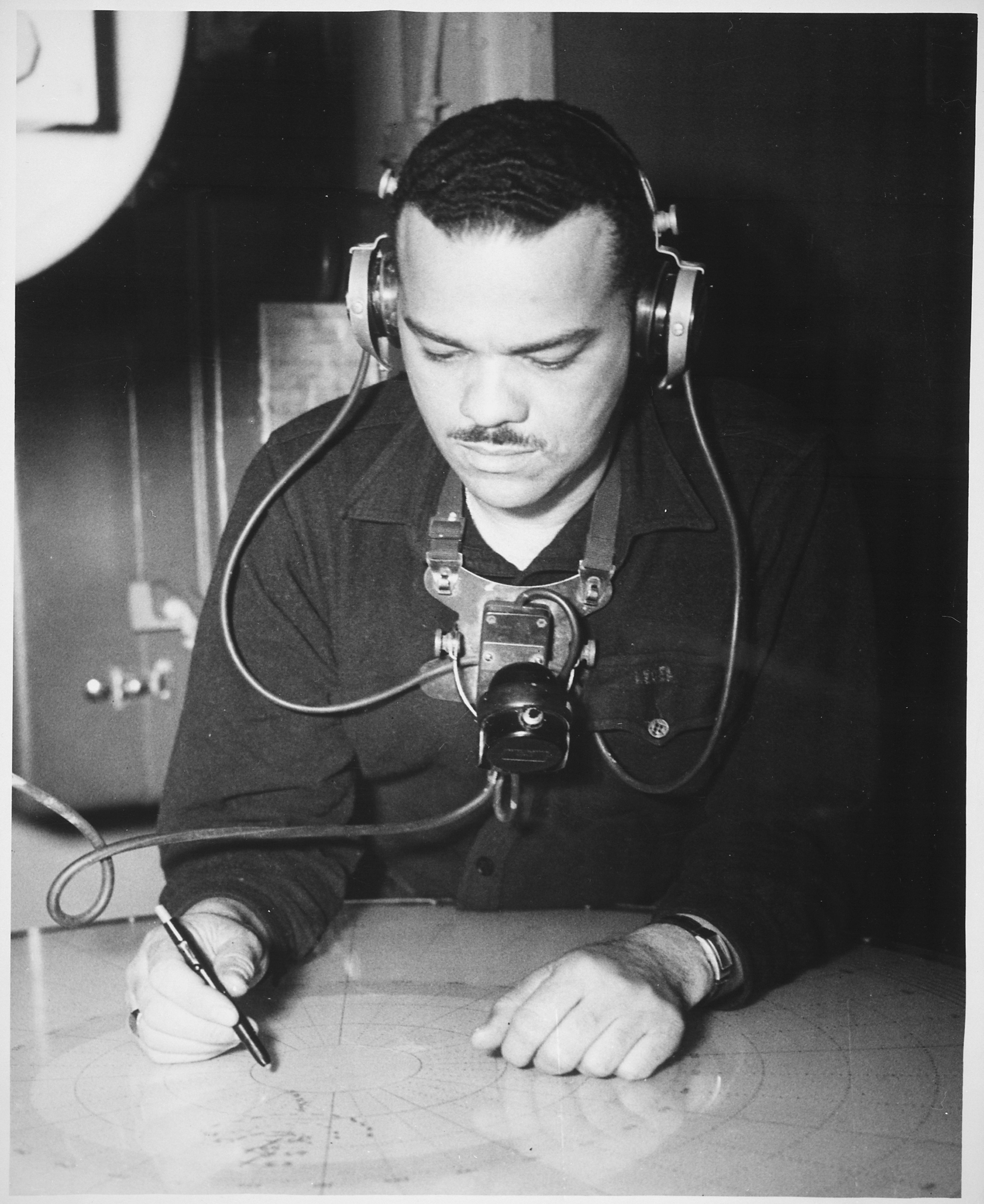
Coast Guardsman Joseph K. Noel, Radioman third class, pictured on duty aboard a Coast Guard-manned frigate.

Radioman (RM) was a rating for United States Navy and United States Coast Guard enlisted personnel, specializing in communications technology.

== History of the rating ==
The rating was created originally in 1921. In 1998 the rating merged with the Data Processing Technician (DP) rating, retaining the Radioman designation until 1999 when it was redesignated Information Systems Technician (IT). Both Radiomen and Data Processing Technicians in the Navy had to undergo general rate training and take a computer-based exam in order to be designated under the new IT rating. In 1996, the Submarine force merged Radioman with Electronics Technicians/ Electronic Warfare Specialist. The Coast Guard rating was renamed Telecommunications Specialist (TC) in 1995, which split in July 2003 to make up the Information System Technician (IT) and Operations Specialist (OS) ratings.

== Scope of work ==
The Radiomen of the US Navy were responsible for transmitting and receiving radio signals, and processing all forms of telecommunications through various transmission media aboard ships, aircraft and at shore facilities. This was done utilizing various frequencies in the ELF, VLF, LF, MF, HF, VHF, UHF, SHF and EHF spectrums. The type of circuits maintained included voice and data circuits between the ships of a battle group and allied units. Their duties also included message systems for generalized broadcasts and unit specific messages that were handled based on message priority and handling procedures. They were also responsible for the proper handling and destruction of classified material.

Radiomen were also responsible for periodic maintenance of the communications equipment, to include transmitters, receivers and antennas.

== Positions ==
The positions generally found in the ship's 'Radio Shack' included -

- Broadcast Operator: Responsible for keeping track of incoming traffic.
- Task Group Orestes (TGO) Operator: Responsible for the operation of a teletypewriter circuit, and the use of signals while communicating with ships in the general operating area of the designated task force. The TGO operator would coordinate the transmission of messages inter-task force and would also, on occasion, help to coordinate the position, course and speed of approaching replenishment vessels for underway replenishment (UNREP) or Vertical replenishment(VERTREP) during underway deployments.
- Message Center, Main-Communications (MAINCOMM) Supervisor:, Responsible for the supervision of the message center. The MAINCOMM supervisor would hold quarters before his team of Radiomen went in to take over from the previous watch section and would also make sure that his section was properly trained for the various positions in Radio Central. The MAINCOMM Supervisor was also responsible to maintain discipline and leadership guidance for the Radiomen that worked under him/her, and would also submit evaluations on his crew to the chain of command.
- Facilities Control (FACCON) Supervisor:, Responsible for the supervision of the facilities control area. This supervisor, much alike the MAINCOMM supervisor, would do similar duties, but was responsible for the safe operation of shipboard electronic radio equipment and the associated peripheral equipment, such as quality monitoring systems as well as the maintenance and upkeep of the communications plan (COMPLAN) as well as the operational frequency board.
- Inbound/Outbound Traffic Checker:, Responsible for ensuring that all accountability of all message traffic reached appropriate designated departments as well as proper delivery of messages. This was generally considered a key position, but was often designated to junior Radiomen – particularly on board smaller vessels. On an aircraft carrier, this position was generally assigned to a second-class petty officer or below.
- Repro/Distro Operator:, Responsible for ensuring routed messages were appropriately slotted to the various departments shipboard. This position was generally assigned to paygrade E-3 and below personnel, where their technical prowess and accuracy of running off copies of messages were closely monitored by the MAINCOMM supervisor.
- CRYPTO Operator:, Responsible for ensuring that the cryptographic equipment was in good working order and that the appropriate keying material changes were made in a timely manner. This operator would often work with the Communications Security Material Systems (CMS) Custodian for key changeovers as well as inspections and inventory checks of cryptographic materials and associated electronic equipment.
- Teletype (TTY) Repairman:, Responsible for the maintenance and repair of teletype equipment on board ship as well as shore stations. This position required a high degree of mechanical dexterity with a limited knowledge of electricity and electronics. Typically, teletype repairmen, prior to attending TTY repair school in Norfolk, Virginia, had to take a basic course in electricity and electronics and pass it before being accepted on to TTY repair school.
- Inrouter: Responsible for ensuring that all inbound message traffic was properly routed to the various departments on board ship.
- Outrouter: Responsible for designating outbound messages serial numbers, date-time-group, and verification that messages were signed and released by appropriate officers with release authority. Also looked up and appended the routing for various addressees prior to transmission, until the advent of automated addressing, after which the only router was RULYSUU or RUHGSUU etc., which changed, except for SUU, depending on which Communications Station was expected to accept the traffic.

== See also ==
- List of United States Navy ratings
