= Operations specialist (United States Navy) =

Occupational rating

Operations Specialist
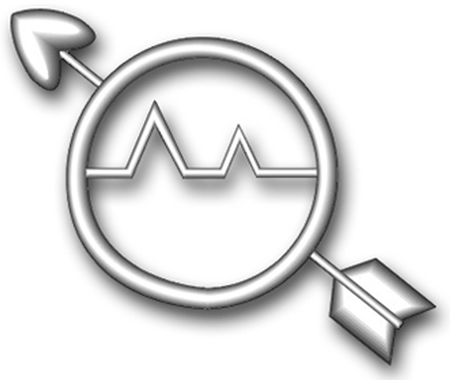
- Rating insignia
- Issued by: United States Navy; United States Coast Guard
- Type: Enlisted rating
- Abbreviation: OS
- Specialty: Technical Operations/Navigation

Operations Specialist (abbreviated as OS) is a United States Navy and United States Coast Guard occupational rating. It is a sea duty-intensive rating in the Navy while most of Coast Guard OS's are at ashore Command Centers.

== Brief history ==
The rating started from the radarman (RD) rating. In the U.S. Coast Guard the Operations specialist rate was formed by combining the radarman (RD) and telecommunications specialist rate (TC). When the radarman rating was split up into OS, electronics technician (ET), and electronic warfare technician (EW) ratings, the original RD rating badge continued to be used by the operations specialist. It symbolizes the radar scope (circle portion of symbol) oscilloscope radar (O-scope) used to determine a target's range from the radar antenna (the two spikes in the line drawn across the scope), and the arrow represents the ability to detect the azimuth or direction of the target.

== Description ==
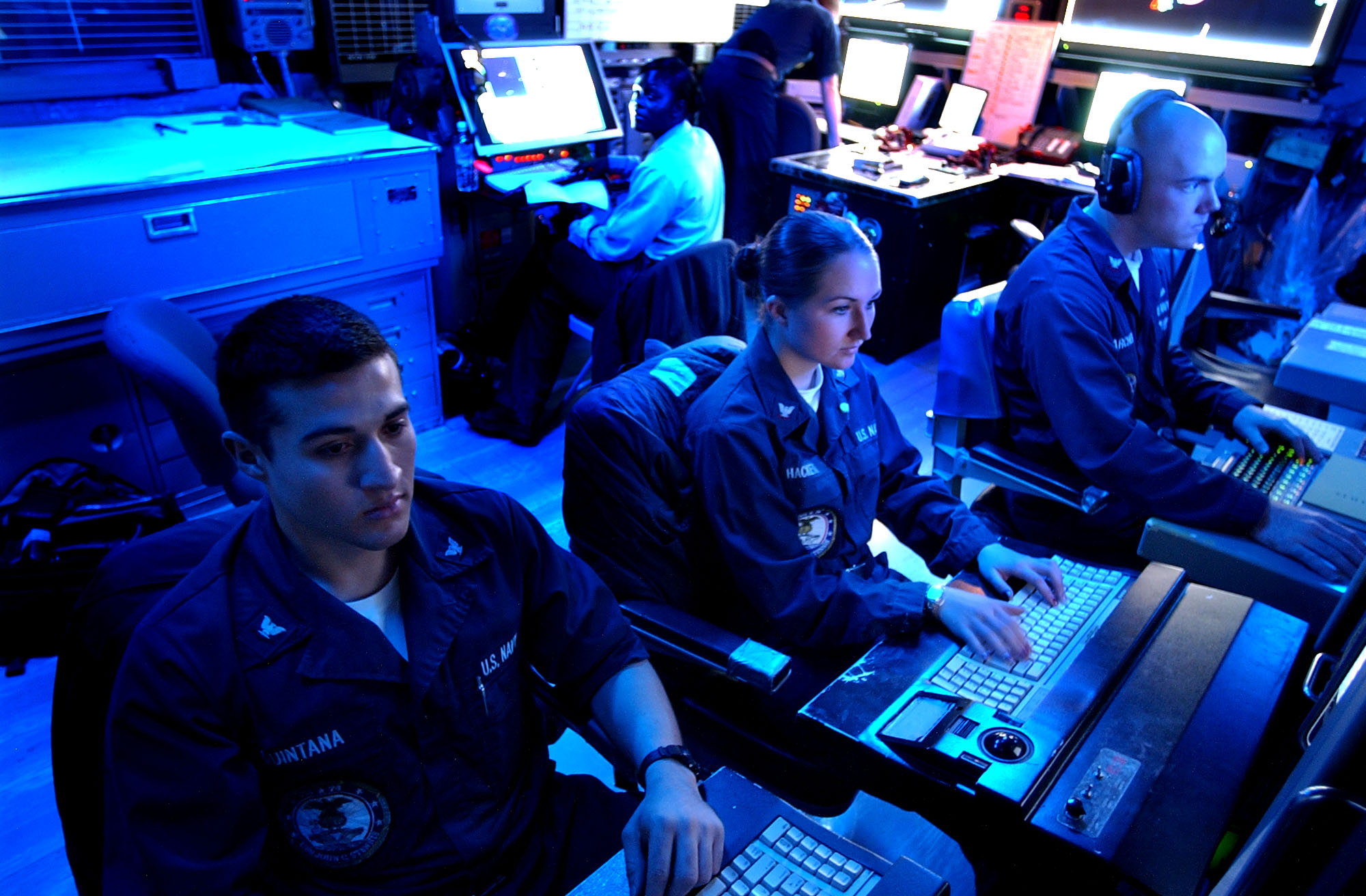
Operations specialists at work

Operations specialists aboard U.S. Navy combat vessels work in the combat information center (CIC) or combat direction center (CDC), aka: "combat", the tactical nerve center of the ship. Using a wide variety of assets available to them, Operations Specialists are responsible for the organized collection, processing, display, competent evaluation and rapid dissemination of pertinent tactical combat information to command and control stations, upon which sound tactical decisions may be made. Beginning training (called "A" school) for operations specialist's was originally located at the Naval Training Center (NTC) in Great Lakes Illinois. In 1979 it was moved to Dam Neck in Virginia Beach, Virginia; the school has since moved back to Training Support Center (TSC) of NAVSTA Great Lakes in Illinois. Intermediate and advanced training are in locations like California, Virginia, and various locations throughout the United States Navy. An RDA school was also located on Treasure Island at San Francisco, Calif.

They maintain combat information center displays of strategic and tactical information, including various plotting boards and tables depicting position and movement of submarines, ships and aircraft as well as tote boards containing data relevant to the tactical picture. They operate surveillance, tracking and height-finding radars, identification friend or foe (IFF) equipment, HF, VHF and UHF radios, tactical data link (TADIL-A/Link 11, TADIL-J/Link 16, etc.) systems and displays, and computerized consoles and peripheral equipment that allows them interface with the Aegis combat system. The tactical data links exchange data between other units in the force; i.e., ships, aircraft and other military units such as deployed Army, Air Force, Marine and Coast Guard commands. They operate encrypted and non-encrypted long and short range radio-telephone equipment as well as intra-ship communication systems.

With specialized training, they also may serve as combat air controllers for helicopters, anti-submarine patrol aircraft, and jet strike fighter aircraft in anti-submarine tactical air controller (ASTAC), sea combat air controller (SCAC), and air intercept controller (AIC) roles. They also serve as watch supervisors, watch officers, and section leaders underway and in port aboard ship and at commands ashore. Operations specialists assist in shipboard navigation through plotting and monitoring the ship's position using satellite and other electronic navigation resources, as well as fixing the ship's position near landfall using radar imaging.

They interpret and evaluate presentations and tactical situations and make recommendations to the commanding officer, CIC watch officer (CICWO), tactical action officer (TAO), officer of the deck (OOD), or any of their commissioned officer surrogates during various watch or combat/general quarters conditions. They apply a thorough knowledge of doctrine and procedures applicable to CIC operations contained in U.S. Navy instructions and allied tactical or U.S. Navy tactical publications. Operations Specialists are responsible for maintaining the physical space of CIC as well as performing minor planned maintenance care of the equipment they operate. A minimum of a secret security clearance is required for this rating, with more senior personnel holding a top secret clearance.

Operations specialists provide to their shipboard or shore-based command a wide range of technical information and assistance related to anti-surface warfare, anti-air warfare, anti-submarine warfare, amphibious warfare, mine warfare, naval gunfire support, search and rescue operations, radar and dead reckoning navigation, overt intelligence gathering and transmittal, and other matters pertaining to the operations specialist's area. They also have a working knowledge of protocols and procedures in electronic warfare, though this area is normally covered by its own occupational rating, such as cryptologic technician (CT) aboard ship or ashore, or naval aircrewman (AW) aboard specific naval electronic warfare and reconnaissance aircraft.

== Duties ==
The duties performed by Navy operations specialists include:

- Operate a variety of computer-interfaced detection, tracking and height-finding radars
- Plot a ship's position, heading, and speed, using computerized or manual trigonometric methods using a Maneuvering Board (MOE Board)
- Maintain a tactical picture of the surrounding seas by plotting and maintaining a visual representation of ships, submarines and aircraft in the area, including friendly, neutral, hostile and civilian contacts
- Use secure and non-secure radio in communicating, in plain voice or coded signals, with other air, sea or land units to coordinate tactical and combat evolution's
- Operate common marine electronic navigation instruments including radar and satellite systems, plot own ship's position and movement on charts and make recommendations in navigation to the officer of the deck
- Provide target plotting data to the command and control based on information received from target tracking devices
- Make recommendations to command and control regarding tactical and combat procedures
- Assist in the coordination and control of landing craft during amphibious assaults
- Communicate with spotters, plot and make calculations to adjust fire during naval gunfire support missions
- Coordinate and assist in plotting and ship maneuvers for emergency evolution's such as man overboard and other search and rescue activities
- Provide assisted and direct air control of combat aircraft in anti-air, anti-surface and anti-submarine warfare

The job of an operations specialist can be very intense and stressful while the ship is underway. Operational tempos go from next to no contacts in the middle of an ocean to dozens, if not more in congested waters. They are required to be able to think quickly, drawing on a large reserve of tactical and procedural knowledge and make calculations on the fly in the fast-paced and information-saturated environment of naval combat operations at sea.

The duties performed by Coast Guard operations specialists include:

- Search and rescue or law enforcement case execution
- Combat Information Center operations
- Intelligence gathering

== See also ==
- List of United States Navy ratings
