= Radarman =

Radarman was a rating in the U.S. Navy and the U.S. Coast Guard during, and after, World War II. The following ratings existed during the war for male or female enlisted personnel training, or with training, in the operation and maintenance of radar sets:

== Levels of rating ==
- Radarman, striker (E-3) – designated RD.
- Radarman, RDSN (E-3) – designated RDSN.
- Radarman 3rd class (E-4)- designated RD3.
- Radarman 2nd class (E-5) – designated RD2.
- Radarman 1st class (E-6) – designated RD1.
- Radarman, chief (E-7) – designated RDC.
- Radarman, senior chief (E-8) – designated RDCS.
- Radarman, master chief (E-9) – designated RDCM.

== Duties ==
The radarman was generally required to attend and complete a U.S. Navy Class "A" radar school at a designated Naval Training Centers (NTC) in the United States. Once assigned to a ship or shore station, the radarman was required to operate and maintain the installed radar and electronic warfare equipment. Radarmen were specially trained in emergency repair procedures, as their assigned vessels went into combat areas.

The Radarman (RD) rating was changed to Operations Specialist (OS) in October 1972, with its operational duties assigned to the OS rating, electronic warfare operation and maintenance to the Electronic Warfare Technician (EW), and its radar maintenance duties to the Electronics Technician (ET) rating.

Operations Specialists play an important role with search-and-rescue teams, such as man overboard and directing search-and-rescue helicopters to downed pilots at sea.

The Operations Specialist also operates radar, navigation, and communications equipment in shipboard and combat information centers (CICs) or bridges. They detect and track ships, planes, and missiles. They operate and maintain IFF (identification friend or foe) systems.

Since changing from RD to OS, the OS rating has taken on more functions or duties. Besides Radar navigation, tactical communications, naval gunfire support, and Air Intercept Control (AIC), the OS now directs amphibious operations, establishes and maintains tactical data links, Anti-Submarine Tactical Air Control (ASTAC), Strike control, and other duties.

== United States Coast Guard ==
The United States Coast Guard Radarman specialized training took place at the RD "A" school located at the Governors Island New York, These men and women could serve on a variety of assignments including large Coast Guard Ships and Vessel Traffic Services. The school was later moved to United States Coast Guard Training Center Yorktown Virginia where is stayed until 2003. The rate was changed to Operations Specialist during the "Merger of the Millennium" in the summer of 2003.
