= United States Coast Guard officer rank insignia =

United States Coast Guard officer rank insignia describes an officer's pay-grade. Rank is displayed on collar devices, shoulder boards, and on the sleeves of dress uniforms.

== Commissioned officer ranks ==
Commissioned officers in the Coast Guard are line officers, unlike the Navy, which has a staff corps to identify certain career fields. Coast Guard officers hold pay grades ranging from O-1 to O-10 and have the same rank structure as the Navy. Officers holding the rank of ensign (O-1) through lieutenant commander (O-4) are considered junior officers, commanders (O-5) and captains (O-6) are considered senior officers, and rear admirals (O-7) through admirals (O-10) are considered flag officers. The Commandant of the Coast Guard and the Vice Commandant of the Coast Guard are the only members of the Coast Guard authorized to hold the rank of admiral.

The Coast Guard does not have active duty medical officers or chaplains of its own. Instead, U.S. Coast Guard Auxiliary officers, chaplains from the U.S. Navy, as well as officers from the U.S. Public Health Service Commissioned Corps are assigned to the Coast Guard to perform chaplain-related functions and medical-related functions, respectively. These officers wear Coast Guard uniforms but replace the Coast Guard insignia with that of their own service.

The Navy and Coast Guard share identical officer rank insignia except that Coast Guard officers wear a gold Coast Guard Shield in lieu of a line star or staff corps officer insignia.

Commissioned officer grade structure of the United States Coast Guard
| US DoD Pay Grade | O-10 | O-9 | O-8 | O-7 | O-6 | O-5 | O-4 | O-3 | O-2 | O-1 |
| NATO Code | OF-9 | OF-8 | OF-7 | OF-6 | OF-5 | OF-4 | OF-3 | OF-2 | OF-1 |
|---|---|---|---|---|---|---|---|---|---|---|
| Collar insignia |
| Shoulder insignia |
| Sleeve insignia |
| Title | Admiral | Vice admiral | Rear admiral | Rear admiral (lower half) | Captain | Commander | Lieutenant commander | Lieutenant | Lieutenant (junior grade) | Ensign |
| Abbreviation | ADM | VADM | RADM | RDML | CAPT | CDR | LCDR | LT | LTJG | ENS |

== Warrant officer ranks ==
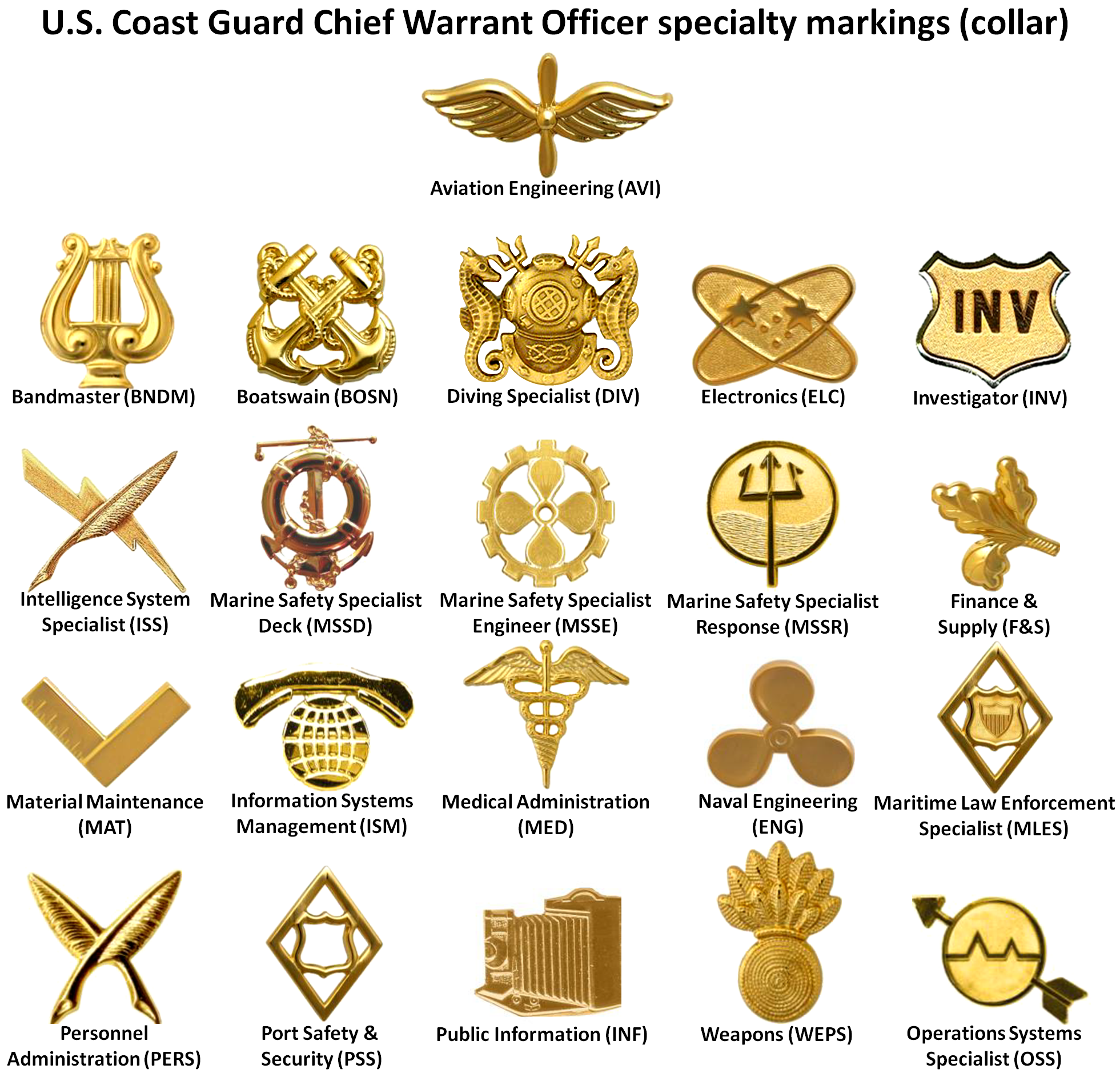
U.S. Coast Guard Chief Warrant Officer specialty insignia worn on the collar and shoulder boards (depicted left)

Highly qualified enlisted personnel in pay grades E-6 through E-9 with a minimum of eight years' experience can compete each year for appointment as warrant officers (WO). Successful candidates are chosen by a board and then commissioned as chief warrant officer two (CWO2) in one of twenty-one specialties. Over time, chief warrant officers may be promoted to chief warrant officer three (CWO3) and chief warrant officer four (CWO4). The ranks of warrant officer (WO1) and chief warrant officer five (CWO5) are not currently used in the Coast Guard. Chief warrant officers may also compete for the Chief Warrant Officer to Lieutenant Program. If selected, the warrant officer will be promoted to lieutenant (O-3E). The "E" designates over four years' active duty service as a warrant officer or enlisted member and entitles the member to a higher rate of pay than other lieutenants.

Warrant officer grade structure of the United States Coast Guard Note: Crossed anchors in the graphics indicate a rating of Boatswain's Mate
| US DoD Pay Grade | W-4 | W-3 | W-2 |
| NATO Code | WO-4 | WO-3 | WO-2 |
|---|---|---|---|
| Collar insignia |
| Shoulder insignia |
| Sleeve insignia |
| Title | Chief Warrant Officer 4 | Chief Warrant Officer 3 | Chief Warrant Officer 2 |
| Abbreviation | CWO-4 | CWO-3 | CWO-2 |

== United States Coast Guard Auxiliary ==
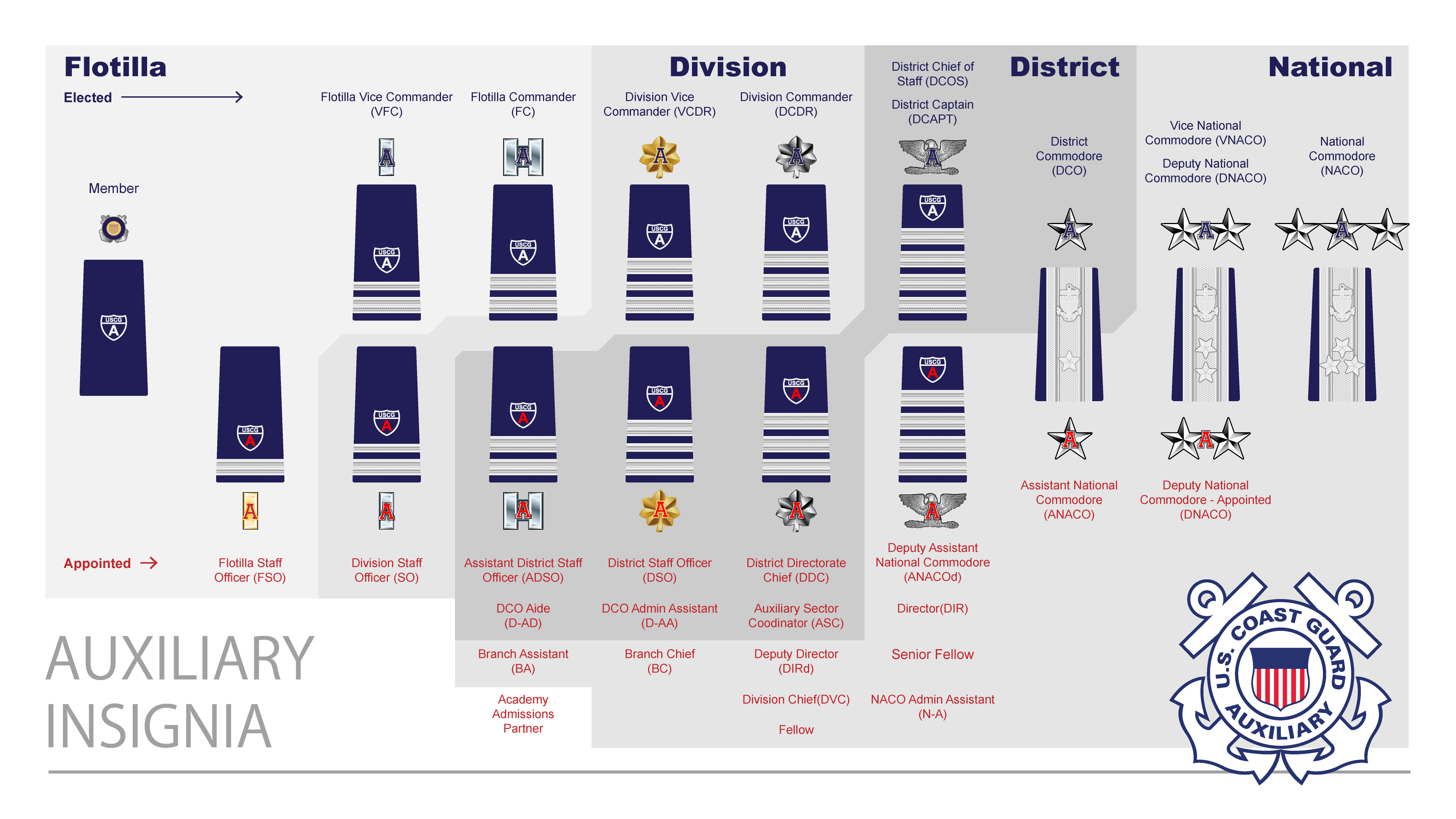
USCG Auxiliary Insignia

The United States Coast Guard Auxiliary is the uniformed auxiliary service of the Coast Guard. The Auxiliary does not use the Coast Guard active duty rank system but uses modified Coast Guard officer rank insignia to signify an auxiliarist's position within the USCGAUX. For example, a Flotilla Commander wears insignia similar to a Lieutenant.

USCG Auxiliary officers wear silver braid insignia (referred to as "office insignia") instead of gold; with a "hollow" USCG shield above containing the letters "USCG" superimposed above a red "A" (to signify an appointed officer in an administrative position) or silver "A" (to signify an elected officer in a leadership position). Metal and sew-on insignia are identical to Coast Guard officer insignia, except that a red, blue, or black "A" is superimposed.

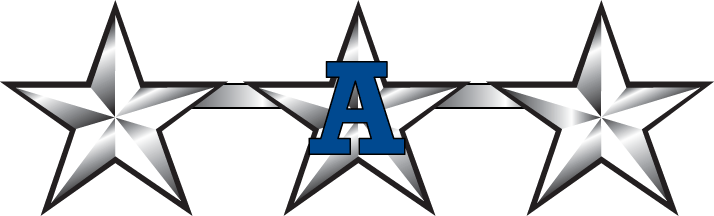
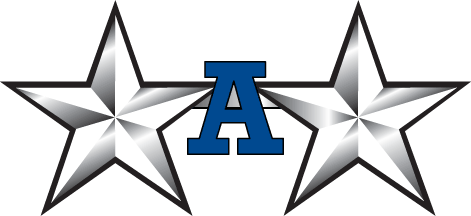
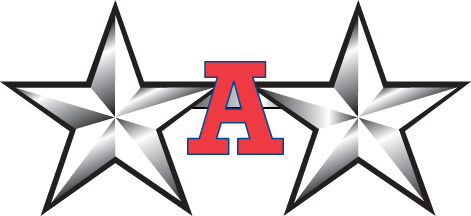
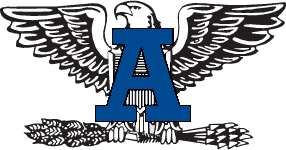
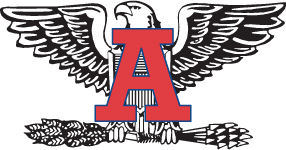
| NATO code | OF-10 | OF-9 | OF-8 | OF-7 | OF-6 | OF-5 | OF-4 | OF-3 | OF-2 | OF-1 |
|---|---|---|---|---|---|---|---|---|---|---|---|
| United States Coast Guard Auxiliary |
| Elected positions | | | National Commodore (NACO) | Vice National Commodore (VNACO); Deputy National Commodore (DNACO) | District Commodore (DCO) | District Chief of Staff (DCOS); District Captain (DCAPT) | Division Commander (DCDR) | Division Vice Commander (VCDR) | Flotilla Commander (FC) | Vice Flotilla Commander (VFC) |
| Appointed positions | | | | Deputy National Commodore (DNACO) | Assistant National Commodore (ANACO) | Deputy Assistant National Commodore (ANACOd); Director (DIR); NACO Admin Assistant (N-A) | District Directorate Chief (DDC); Auxiliary Sector Coordinator (ASC); Deputy Director (DIRd); Division Chief (DVC); NACO Aide (N-D) | District Staff Officer (DSO); DCO Admin Assistant (D-AA); Branch Chief (BC) | Assistant District Staff Officer (ADSO); DCO Aide (D-AD); Branch Assistant (BA); Academy Admissions Partner | Division Staff Officer (SO) | Flotilla Staff Officer (FSO); Detachment Leader (DL) |

== See also ==
- List of United States Coast Guard enlisted rates
- Revenue Cutter Service officer ranks — the preceding agency to the USCG.
- Naval officer ranks — comparison to other countries and explanation of NATO rank codes
