= Naval Station Great Lakes =

United States Navy base

- Part of Navy Region Mid-Atlantic
- Great Lakes, Illinois, U.S.
- Naval Station Great Lakes insignia

Site information
- Owner: United States
- Controlled by: United States Navy

Location
- Location in Illinois Location in the United States
- Coordinates: 42°18′36″N 87°51′00″W

Site history
- In use: 1911–present
- Great Lakes Naval Training Station
- U.S. National Register of Historic Places
- U.S. Historic district
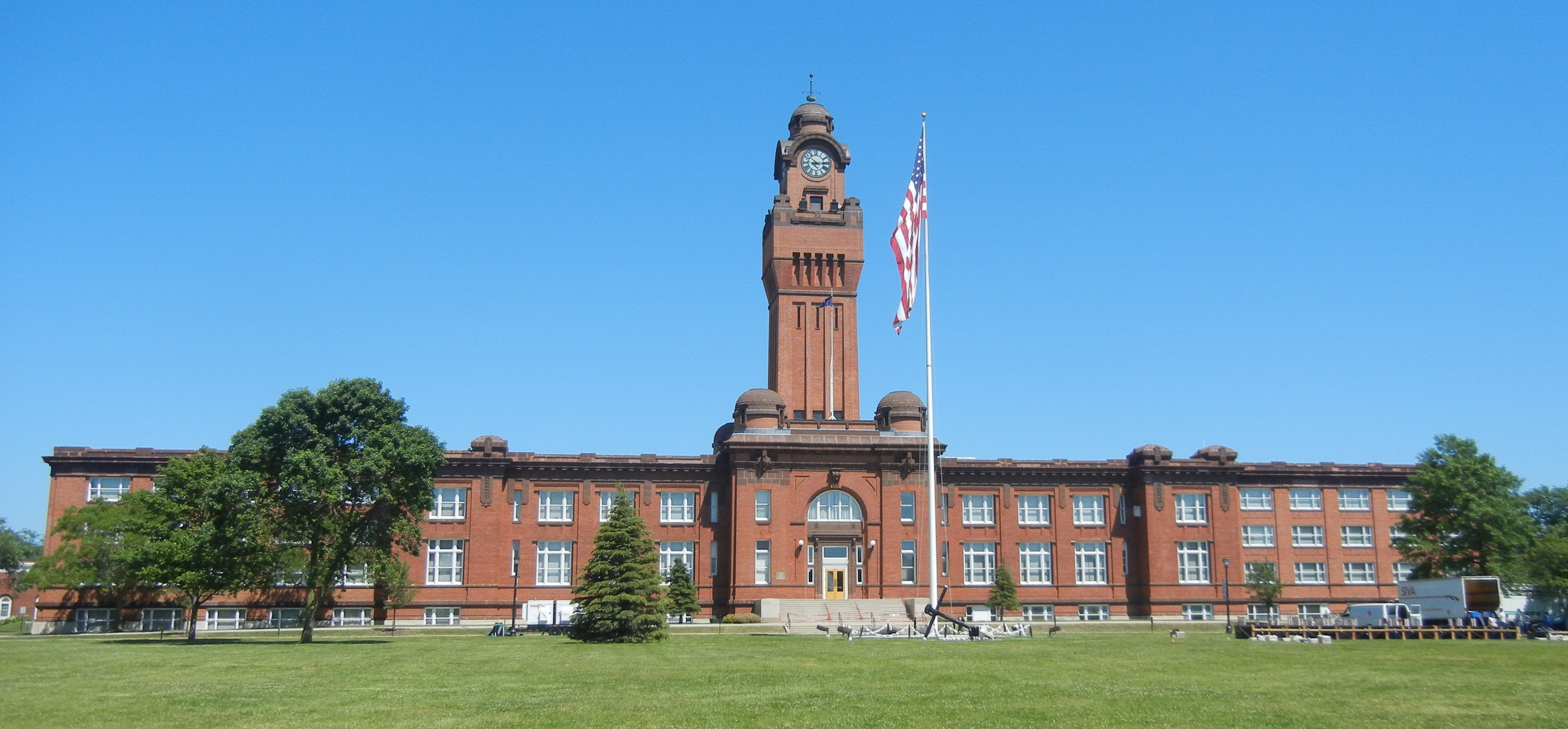
- Great Lakes Building 1
- Nearest city: North Chicago, Illinois, U.S.
- Area: 193.2 acres (78.2 ha)
- Built: 1906
- Architects: Jarvis Hunt, Et al.
- Architectural style: Classical Revival, Federal Revival
- NRHP reference No.: 86002890
- Added to NRHP: September 15, 1986

Naval Station Great Lakes (NAVSTA Great Lakes) is the home of the United States Navy's only current boot camp, located near North Chicago, in Lake County, Illinois, along Lake Michigan. Important tenant commands include Naval Service Training Command, Recruit Training Command, Training Support Center Great Lakes, United States Military Entrance Processing Command and Navy Talent Acquisition Group Great Lakes. Naval Station Great Lakes is the largest military installation in Illinois and the largest training station in the Navy. The base has 1,153 buildings situated on 1,628 acres (6.59 km^{2}) and has 69 mi (111 km) of roadway to provide access to the base's facilities. Within the naval service, it has several different nicknames, including "The Quarterdeck of the Navy". It is also referred to as "second boot camp" for those attending Training Support Command.

The original 39 buildings built between 1905 and 1911 were designed by Jarvis Hunt.

The base functions similarly to a small city, with its own fire department, Naval Security Forces (Police), and public works department.

One of the landmarks of the base is Building 1, also known as the clocktower building. Completed in 1911, the building is made of red brick, and has a tower over the third floor of the building. It faces a large ceremonial parade ground, Ross Field.

== Major tenant commands ==
=== Naval Service Training Command ===
Naval Service Training Command (NSTC) is a one-star echelon III command that is responsible to the Chief of Naval Education and Training for the indoctrination and training of all new accessions into the Naval Service, with the exception of Midshipmen who access through the United States Naval Academy. This includes all new recruits through Recruit Training Command, the Navy's only enlisted recruit training location and all Officer "Candidates" who are seeking a commission through the Officer Training Command at Naval Station Newport, Rhode Island. Also under its purview is the operation of the various Naval Reserve Officers Training Corps (NROTC) units in universities across the country.

=== Recruit Training Command ===
In 1996, RTC Great Lakes became the Navy's only basic training facility. The Base Realignment and Closure Commission of 1993 resulted in the closure of Naval Training Center San Diego, California and Naval Training Center Orlando, Florida, their associated Recruit Training Commands, and the consolidation of US Navy enlisted recruit training to Great Lakes. Approximately 40,000 recruits pass through Recruit Training Command annually with an estimated 7,000 recruits on board the installation at any time. RTC Great Lakes has been active for over 100 years.

=== Training Support Center Great Lakes ===
TSC Great Lakes is the Navy's premier technical training command. It has an annual throughput of 16,000 Sailors. TSC supports the following six learning sites:

- Surface Combat Systems Training Command (SCSTC) Great Lakes
- Surface Warfare Engineering School Command (SWESC) Great Lakes
- Center for Explosive Ordnance Disposal and Diving Detachment Great Lakes (CENEODDIVE DET GLKS)
- Center for Naval Leadership (CNL)
- Center for Personal Development (CPD)
- Center for Service Support (CSS)

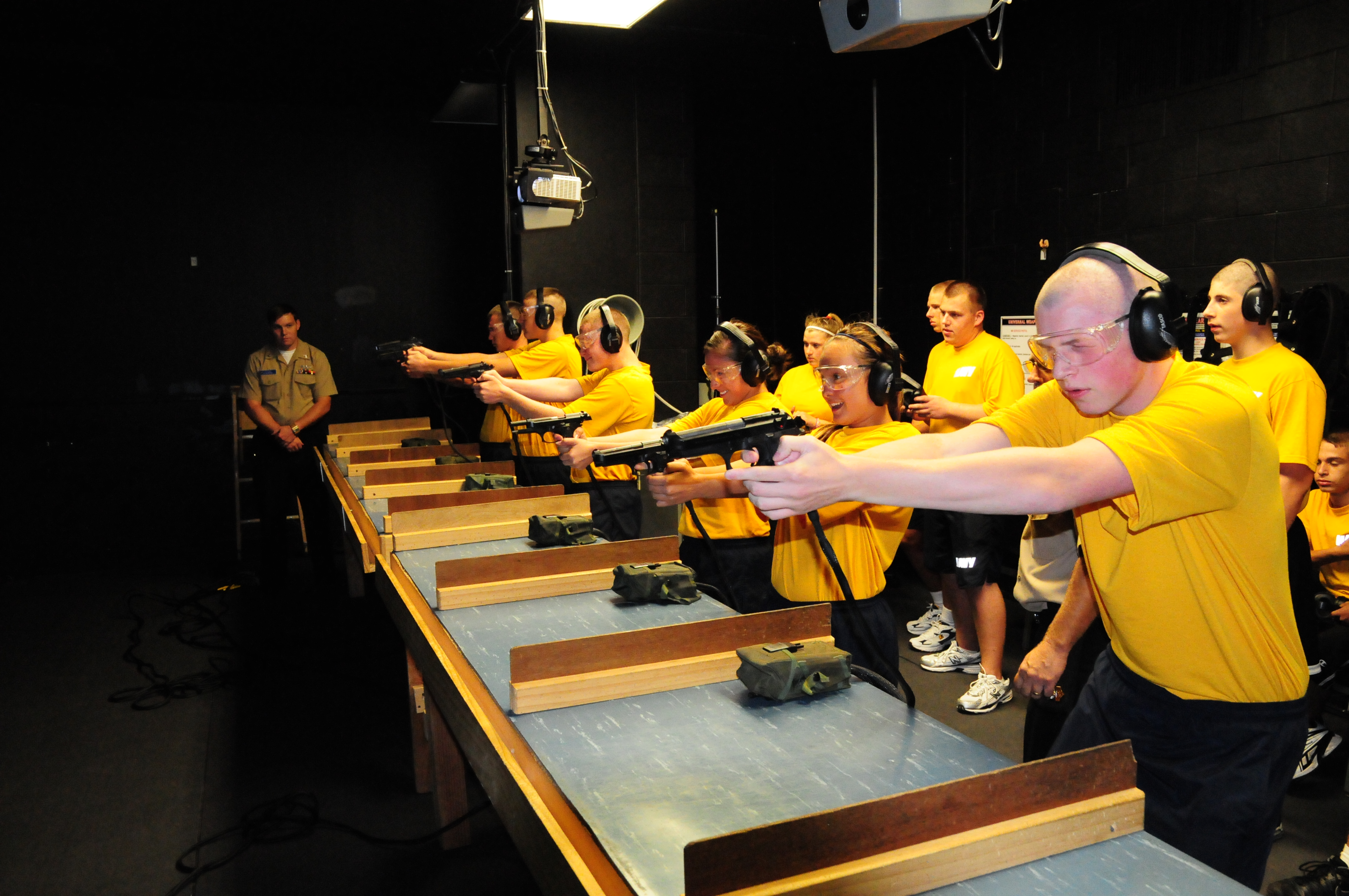
Navy JROTC cadets from Hamilton High School, Ohio, practice marksmanship at the Fire Arms Training Simulator (FATS)

The following rating training class A-schools are located at Naval Station Great Lakes:

- Electrician's mate (EM)
- Electronics Technician (ET)
- Fire Controlman (FC)
- Gunner's mate (GM)
- Interior Communications Electrician (IC)
- Boatswain's mate (BM)
- Operations Specialist (OS)
- Hull Maintenance Technician (HT)
- Damage Controlman (DC)
- Engineman (EN)
- Gas Turbine System Technician (Electrical) (GSE)
- Gas Turbine System Technician (Mechanical) (GSM)
- Machinery Repairman (MR)
- Quartermaster (QM)
- Machinist's mate (MM)

Culinary Specialist (CS) A-school was also taught at TSC Great Lakes until December 10, 2010, when the school graduated its final class. The course has been consolidated with the US Army's parallel program and relocated to Fort Lee, Virginia.

Hospital Corpsman (HM) "A" School has been moved out of Great Lakes. The last class graduated on July 27, 2011. Its last class was Class 11–125. The school has relocated to the Medical Education and Training Campus at Fort Sam Houston, Joint Base San Antonio, Texas. This change has merged Air Force, Army, and Navy Medical staff to a centralized location.

In addition, all Navy rates that require basic electrical knowledge and troubleshooting training complete Apprentice Technical Training (ATT) school. This includes the Mineman (MN) and Sonar Technician (Surface) (STG) rates, as well as some aviation rates prior to detachment to their respective school locations in San Diego, CA and Pensacola, Florida. Boatswain's Mates complete Surface Common Core (SCC) Basic Maintenance Training and engineering rates complete Basic Engineering Common Core (BECC).

=== Navy Reserve Region Readiness and Mobilization Command Great Lakes ===
Formerly Navy Region Mid-Atlantic Reserve Component Command (NRMA RCC), Navy Reserve Region Readiness and Mobilization Command (REDCOM) Great Lakes oversees multiple Navy Reserve Centers across several states. It delivers administrative support, training, and management to generate mobilization readiness for regional reserve personnel.

=== Navy Talent Acquisition Group Great Lakes ===
Formerly Navy Recruiting District (NRD) Chicago, Navy Talent Acquisition Group (NTAG) Great Lakes supports Navy is a subordinate command of Navy Recruiting Command. It supports more than 30 recruiting stations across Northern Illinois, Northwest Indiana, Eastern Wisconsin, and the Western Upper Peninsula of Michigan. The command consists of more than 170 recruiters, support staff, and civilians. They are dedicated to finding the next generation of Sailors through enlisted and officer programs to serve in the United States Navy. NTAG Great Lakes also supports two Military Entrance Processing Stations (MEPS) in Chicago and Milwaukee.

=== Navy Band Great Lakes ===
Established in 1911 and based on board Naval Station Great Lakes, Navy Band Great Lakes is one of 11 official U.S. Navy bands worldwide. Under the operational command of Commander, Naval Service Training Command, “Americas Band” serves as the Navy’s musical ambassadors to the Midwest and inspires patriotism, elevates esprit de corps, enhances Navy awareness and public relations, supports recruiting and retention efforts, preserves the nation’s musical heritage, and projects a positive image of the Navy.

=== United States Military Entrance Processing Command ===
The United States Military Entrance Processing Command (USMEPCOM or MEPCOM) is a major command of the U.S. Department of Defense. The organization screens and processes enlisted recruits into the U.S. Armed Forces in the 65 Military Entrance Processing Stations (MEPS) it operates throughout the United States.

=== 3rd Reserve Officers' Training Corps Brigade ===
The 3rd Reserve Officers' Training Corps Brigade is an Army Reserve Officers' Training Corps brigade based at the Great Lakes Naval Training Center, Illinois. It oversees college and university ROTC programs across nine Midwestern states: Illinois, Iowa, Minnesota, Missouri, North Dakota, Nebraska, South Dakota, Kansas, and Wisconsin.

=== Chicago Recruiting Battalion ===
The Chicago Recruiting Battalion is part of the 3rd Recruiting Brigade of the United States Army Recruiting Command (USAREC). The battalion is responsible for recruiting qualified personnel for service in both the Regular Army and the United States Army Reserve.

Through community outreach, professional development, and support for its personnel and their families, the Chicago Recruiting Battalion seeks to contribute to the Army's overall recruiting mission while maintaining a positive and professional working environment.

=== 9th Marine Corps District ===
9th Marine Corps District (9MCD) is responsible for Marine Corps officer and enlisted recruiting across 19 states – Arizona, Arkansas, Colorado, Idaho, Illinois, Iowa, Kansas, Michigan, Minnesota, Missouri, Nebraska, Nevada, North Dakota, Oklahoma, South Dakota, Texas, Utah, Wisconsin and Wyoming, an area spanning more than 1.3 million square miles. A total of 875 U.S. Marines, Sailors and civilians serve throughout the district, working daily within their local communities, municipalities and schools to identify and prepare the next generation of Marines.

=== Marine Air Control Group 48 ===
Marine Air Control Group 48 (MACG-48) is a United States Marine Corps aviation command and control unit based at Naval Station Great Lakes that is currently composed of 4 squadrons that provide the 4th Marine Aircraft Wing and Marine Forces Reserve with a tactical headquarters, positive and procedural control of aircraft, air defense and aviation command and control.

== History ==
Great Lakes was approved in 1904 by Theodore Roosevelt. Construction was supervised by Navy Captain Albert R. Ross. Chicago-area architect Jarvis Hunt designed the original 39 buildings and Lt. George A. McKay was the civil engineer for the construction on the 172 acres (70 ha) wilderness location; $3.5 million ($125 million today) was appropriated to finance construction. President William Howard Taft dedicated the Naval Training Station in 1911. On 3 July 1911, Joseph Gregg was the first recruit to arrive. He would graduate in the first class of 300. Fifty-five years later, he was buried at the Naval Station Cemetery 5 July 1966.

Legendary band leader and march composer John Philip Sousa was commissioned as a lieutenant in the Navy during World War I. He led the Great Lakes Naval Station Band from mid-1917 until shortly after the Armistice was implemented in November 1918. Great Lakes also had a Radio School including two 400 ft (120 m) towers constructed in 1915. From 1911 to 1916 around 2,000 recruits a year were trained at Great Lakes.

=== World War I ===
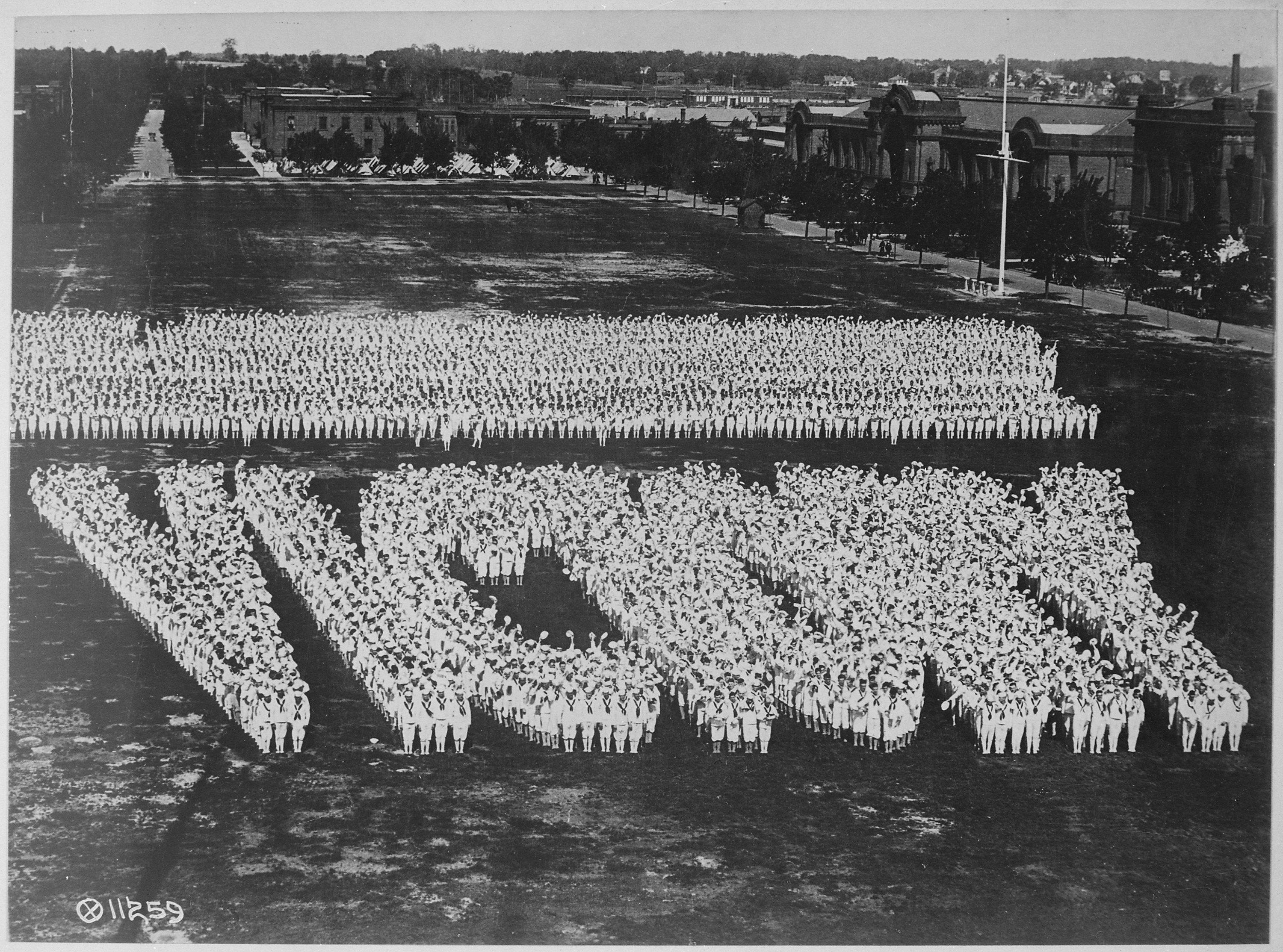
Victory spelled by sailors on the parade grounds at Great Lakes during World War I.

At the start of 1917, just prior to the United States entry to World War I, Great Lakes was under the command of Captain William A. Moffett and had 39 permanent brick buildings, over 165 acres (67 ha), and about 1,500 Sailors. At the close of the war, there were 776 buildings, with 1,200 acres (490 ha) and about 45,000 Sailors in training; 125,000 had been trained at Great Lakes during the war.

=== Interwar period ===
In 1923, Naval Reserve Air Base, Great Lakes was commissioned. Recruit training slowed after the war and halted in 1933. In 1932, Great Lakes had 102 buildings on 507 acres (205 ha). A port was constructed around that time at a cost of $1 million ($23.6 million today).

On 1 July 1933, Great Lakes was closed and placed in a maintenance status. It was reopened 1 July 1935 after lobbying by local businessmen and the Congressional Delegation from Illinois. In 1936, aviation training was moved from Great Lakes to Naval Air Station Glenview.

On 9 December 1940, the Class A Service School opened for its first class.

=== World War II ===
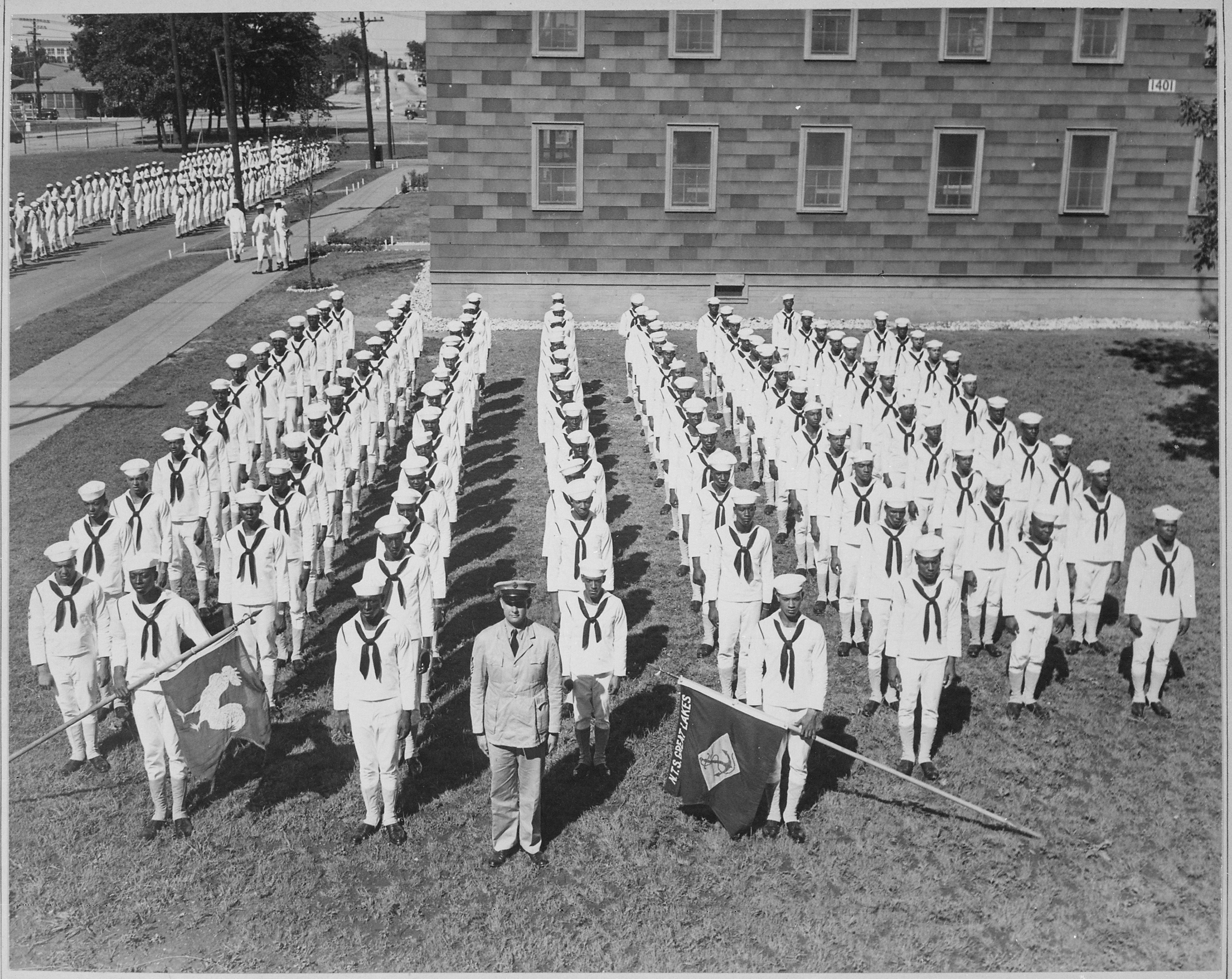
A company of African American recruits at Great Lakes, August 1943.

On 7 December 1941, Pearl Harbor was attacked by Japan, and around 6,000 sailors were training at Great Lakes. This grew to 68,000 in six months; by September 1942, over 100,000 Sailors were training at Great Lakes. The base grew to 1,600 acres (650 ha) in the next 10 months. By mid-1943, there were over 700 instructors at the Class A service schools.

The Navy selected Great Lakes to be the site of the first African American trainees. On 5 June 1942, Doreston Luke Carmen of Galveston, Texas was the first recruit to enter the segregated training facility at Camp Robert Smalls. In September 1942, segregated "Negro Service Schools" were opened. The policy of segregation led to small service school classes with only four or five students in a class. By 1944 Great Lakes began to integrate training and all training was integrated by mid-1945. The Golden Thirteen were commissioned in March 1944 after training at Great Lakes.

Four million served on active duty in the Navy during World War II. Over one million Sailors were trained at Great Lakes.

=== 1946 to 1960 ===
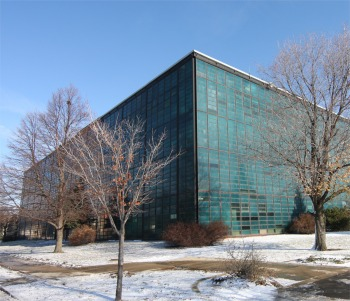
Modernist glass and steel US Navy Gunnery school, Great Lakes. Designed by Skidmore, Owings & Merrill, dedicated in 1954, demolished 2012.

In 1948, a boot camp for WAVES (female recruits) opened at Great Lakes, first graduating 5 October 1948. In 1951, female recruit training left Great Lakes for United States Naval Training Center Bainbridge, Maryland.

Great Lakes hosted the Commander, Ninth Naval District from 1945 until the District was disestablished on 30 June 1979.

In March 1954, new facilities at Great Lakes for training Gunner's Mates, Fire Controlmen, Opticalmen, and Instrumentmen were dedicated, at a cost of $2.2 million ($26.4 million today). At the time, the 95,000 sq ft (8,800 m^{2}) Gunnery School was said to have the largest all-glass facade in the world. Designed by Bruce Graham (co-designer of the former Sears Tower and John Hancock Center) of the Chicago office of Skidmore, Owings & Merrill, the Gunnery School was demolished in 2012 after hands-on training transitioned to computer-based training in 2005. In 2008, an attempt was made to preserve the structure, which was described as a "Cathedral of the Cold War".

Starting in the late 1950s, new barracks, mess halls, classrooms, and staff offices at the Recruit Training Center were built for around $8 million. These facilities served the Navy until the late 1990s rebuild of the recruit training facility.

=== 1960s and 1970s ===
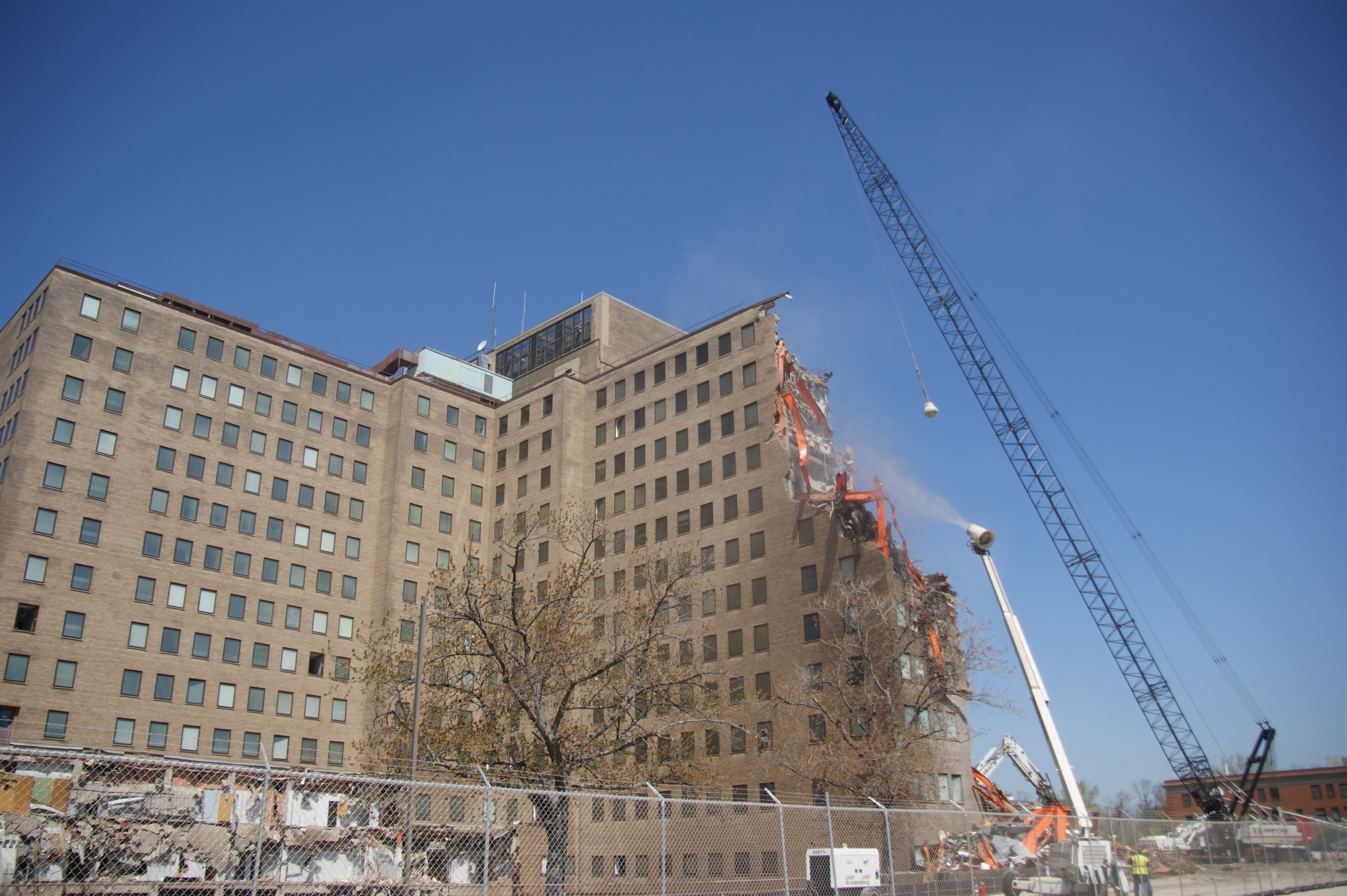
A view of the former Great Lakes Naval Hospital during demolition in 2013. Replaced by Captain James A. Lovell Federal Health Care Center

On 9 December 1960, Great Lakes Naval Hospital (building 200H) was dedicated replacing the original hospital, building 1H. During the Vietnam War, the hospital cared for over 11,000 patients at the 478,000 sq ft (44,400 m^{2}), 825 bed facility. Demolition of the hospital began in January 2013 after its services were transitioned to the Captain James A. Lovell Federal Health Care Center in 2010.

In August 1965, facilities at Great Lakes were used as a morgue in the aftermath of the crash of United Airlines Flight 389.

In the early morning hours of 11 March 1967, Rear Admiral Howard A. Yeager, Commander, 9th Naval District, was killed by a fire at his quarters at Great Lakes. Admiral Yeager and two hospital corpsman (WAVES) died attempting to save the Admiral's wife, who was under medical care for multiple sclerosis. She also died several days later.

On 28 September 1972, 18 were injured at Great Lakes when a tornado struck two of the base housing areas.

==== 1979 Electrical Schools Service Command ====
In 1979 The Electric Service Schools Command served various Rates, including Electrical Schools for Electrician's Mates. Below is the logo used for the Service Schools Command Logo made of brass and mounted on a wooden shield plaque.

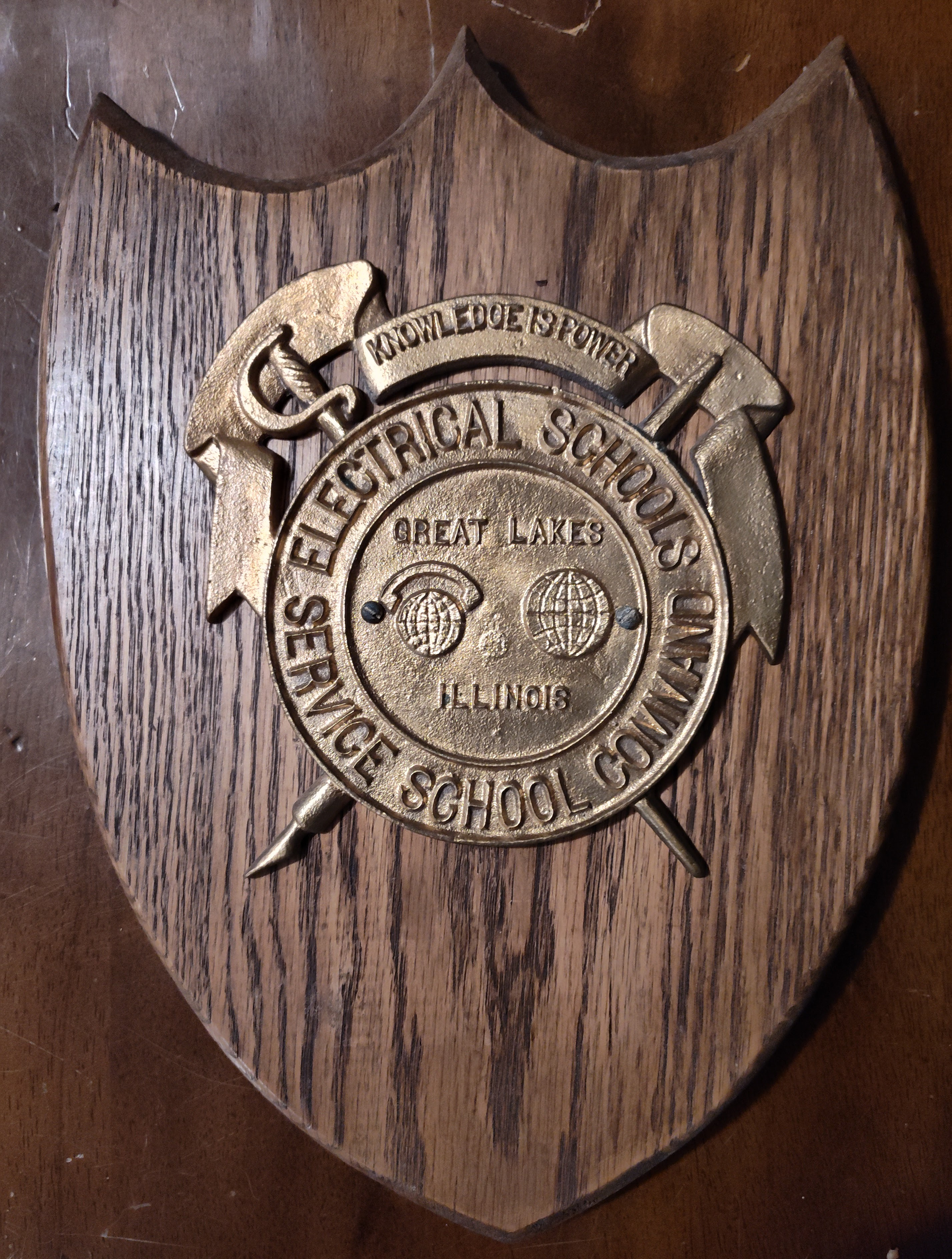
GL Electrical Schools Service School Command Plaque

==== 1979 riots ====
In 1979, there was violence between sailors at Great Lakes and civilians of North Chicago. In June 1979, more than 300 sailors armed with bricks and rocks rioted in North Chicago for at least two consecutive nights in protest after a group of civilians infiltrated the base and beat a sailor. Two hundred sailors were said to have climbed the fence, entering North Chicago and clashing with local police. Sixteen persons were arrested, with five injuries on the first night. Five were arrested by police, with 16 in custody of Navy authorities on the second night. Additionally, six sailors and five police officers were injured on the second night of riots and a police cruiser was overturned. Sailors claimed unfair treatment and harassment in the North Chicago entertainment district known as the "strip". Local officials disputed the claims. The six-block entertainment district or "strip" was eventually placed off limits indefinitely by the base commander.

In the aftermath of the rioting, 58 summary courts-martial were conducted, 19 sailors were found not guilty, and the base commander Captain Robert D. Colvin was replaced by Rear Admiral Thomas L. Malone Jr.

Days after the riots on 28 June 1979, four were sought in connection with the robbery of the Great Lakes Naval Station branch of the Citizens Bank of Waukegan. Around $125,000 ($554,505 today) was stolen. The bank manager was abducted from his home in Zion and was held captive along with several others until the automatic lock of the bank vault allowed it to be opened the next morning. No one was harmed in the robbery. Payday for the base was set for the following day.

=== 1980s ===
In 1981, Melvin Dahl, a sailor stationed at Great Lakes, was discharged from the navy due to his sexual orientation. He later filed a lawsuit, during which Dahl mentioned that he was not the only homosexual at the Great Lakes station. This prompted the Naval Investigative Service (NIS), the predecessor to the modern-day Naval Criminal Investigative Service (NCIS), to investigate this claim in the Chicago area. They confirmed Dahl's allegation, and also learned that the gay men in the area referred to themselves and others as a "Friend of Dorothy". The NIS believed this "Dorothy" woman was the ringleader of a group of gay military personnel and could name the homosexuals enlisted at the base, if apprehended. Unknown to them, "Friend of Dorothy" is an in-community term to serve as a furtive way of disclosing sexual orientation while avoiding hostility. The term was likely based on the protagonist Dorothy Gale from the 1939 Wizard of Oz film, portrayed by actress and gay icon Judy Garland. The NIS launched an enormous and futile hunt for this fictional "Dorothy" woman.

In 1984, 34 people were arrested in a drug sting called Operation Blueboy, in which investigators posed as sailors based at Great Lakes. Nineteen of those arrested were cab drivers, while others were tavern employees on the North Chicago "strip".

The site was added to the National Register of Historic Places as Great Lakes Naval Training Station historic district in 1986 covering 1,932 acres (7.8 km^{2}), 43 buildings, 14 structures, and six objects.

In September 1986, a US naturalized immigrant from Pakistan shot three, killing a senior instructor, after it became clear that he would be dropped from an electronics training program at Apprentice Technical Training in Great Lakes. He was sentenced to life in prison and a dishonorable discharge in 1987.

=== 1990s ===
The North Chicago "strip" was well known for prostitution, drugs, and crime by the early 1990s, when it became further isolated from the base after King Drive railroad crossing was closed, cutting the city's connection to Great Lakes. Following the September 11 attacks in 2001, food deliveries from off base were further restricted, continuing the area's economic decline.

=== Base Realignment and Closure of 1993 ===
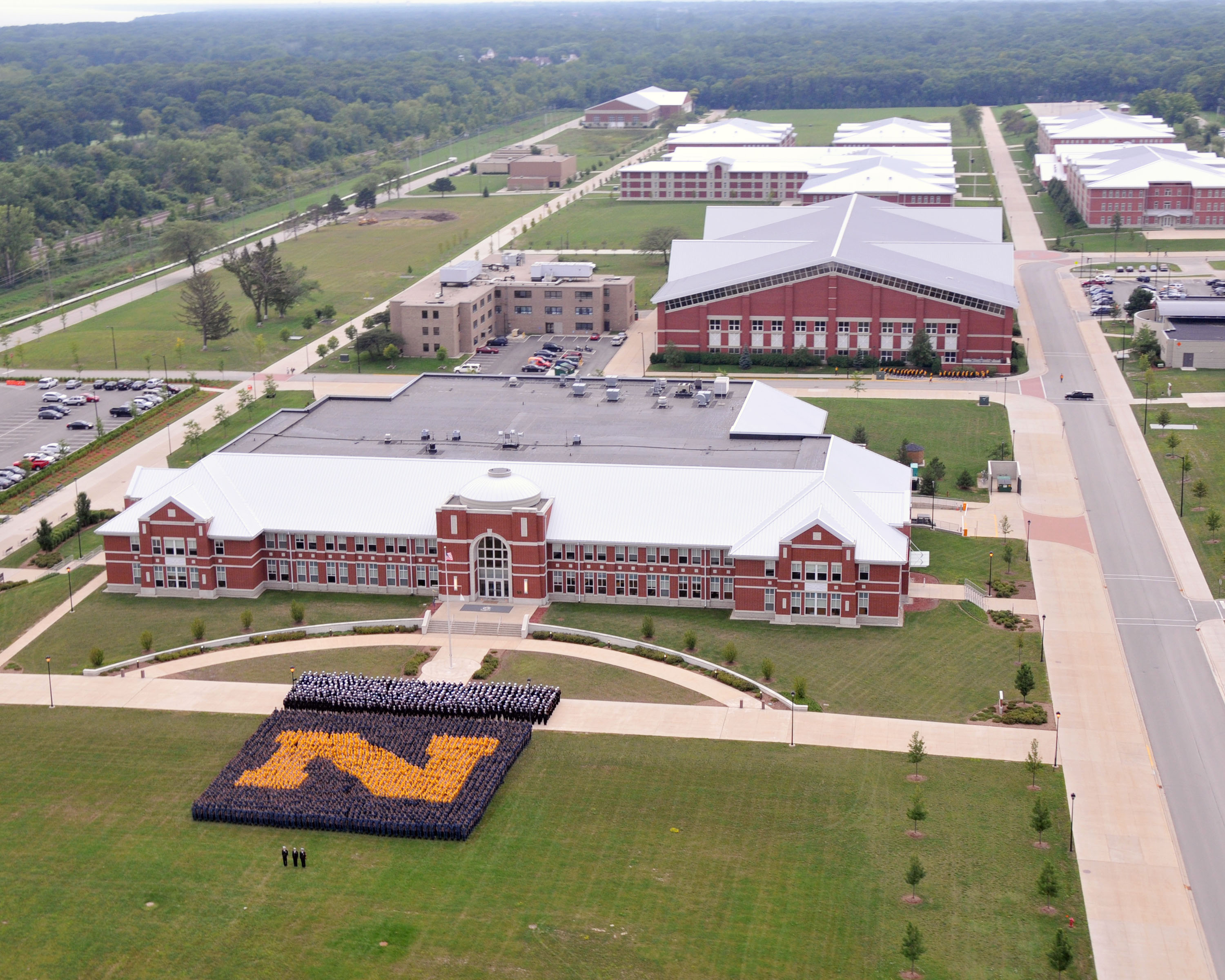
A 2011 aerial view of some of the recruit training facilities constructed during the recapitalization of RTC that followed BRAC 1993.

The 1993 Base Realignment and Closure Commission recommended the closure of recruit training in San Diego and Orlando, making Great Lakes the sole US Navy site for recruit training. The recommendations were predicted to result in a net gain of over 8,000 military and civilian jobs to Great Lakes.

=== Base Realignment and Closure of 2005 ===
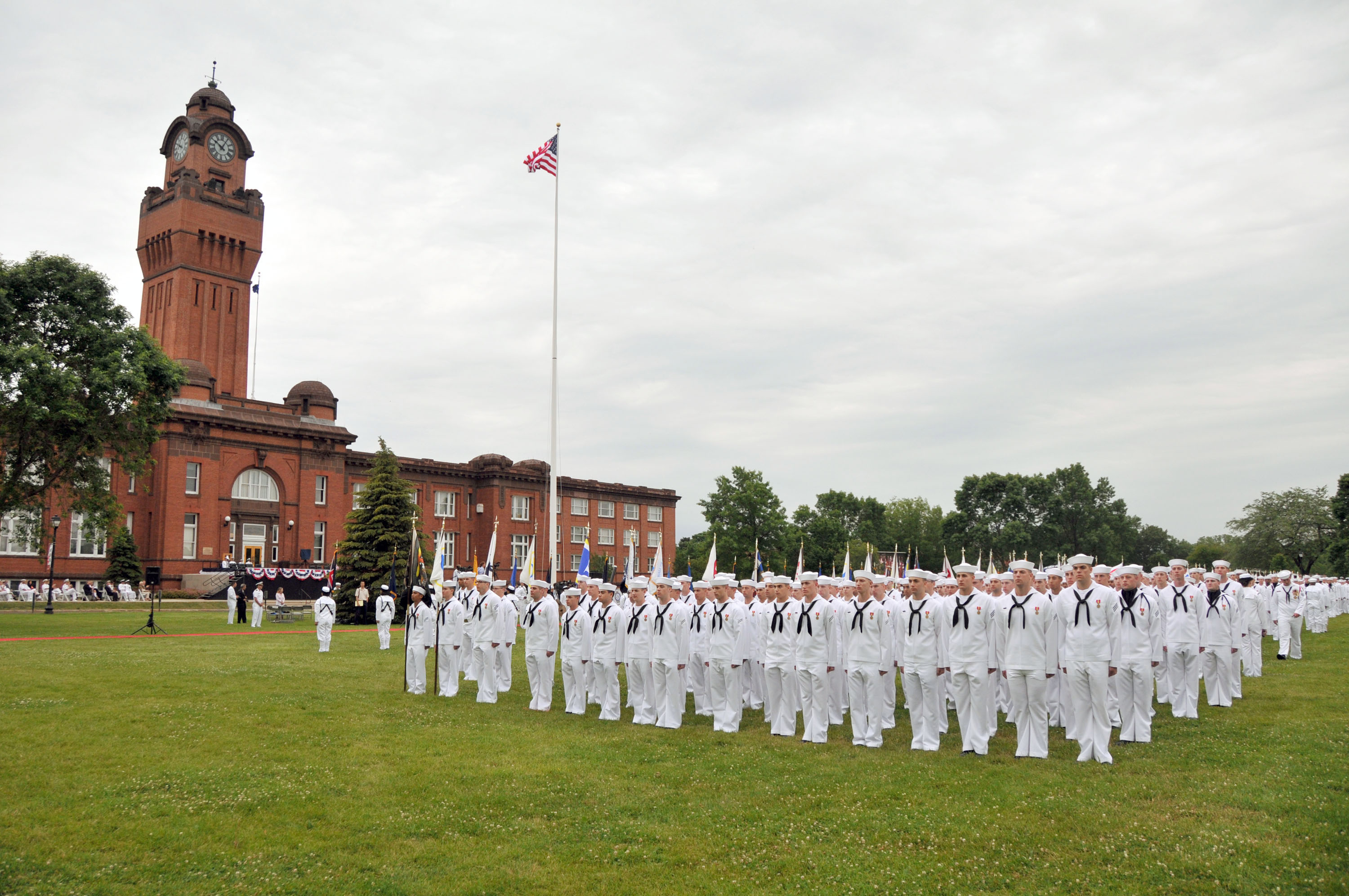
Recruits stand at attention for a special ceremony commemorating the centennial of Great Lakes.

The 2005 Base Realignment and Closure Commission recommended a realignment of Great Lakes that would result in the loss of around 2,000 jobs. At the time, Illinois Governor Rod Blagojevich pledged to retain as many of the jobs as possible. The Naval Station Great Lakes and the Recruit Training / Boot Camp portion were not slated for closing. Almost $800 million had been invested in building new barracks ("ships"), Battle Stations 21, as well as numerous upgrades around the base, including a non-denominational chapel, and reception center for civilian families. It is the United States Navy's only boot camp facility. Approximately 40,000 recruits pass through RTC annually with up to 7,000 enrolled at the installation at any time.

Geographically, the station separates the affluent North Shore from the more industrial Waukegan/North Chicago area, the latter now announcing numerous redevelopments across their span for strip malls and New Urban residency communities.

=== Athletics ===
The Great Lakes Bluejackets played intercollegiate football from the 1910s to the 1940s including a victory in the 1919 Rose Bowl and a 1943 victory over the undefeated Notre Dame Fighting Irish football squad. Some of the football greats that played for Great Lakes included George Halas, Johnny Lujack and Otto Graham. Notably, Paul Brown, Weeb Ewbank and Frank Leahy were coaches for Great Lakes football as well. In 2010, Northwestern Wildcats football announced they were exploring the possibility of holding practice at Great Lakes.

Great Lakes baseball teams had a record of 188 wins and 32 losses during World War II. In one of the more famous games, in July 1945, Chief Petty Officer Bob Feller pitched a shutout with 10 strikeouts against the Chicago Cubs. In basketball, Great Lakes featured college national player of the year George Glamack.

== Awards ==
Due to the work of improving the quality of life by the Navy Exchange (NEX) store at the Great Lakes Naval Station earned the base the 2023 Admiral Elmo R. Zumwalt Award for Excellence in Housing and Lodging Management. The award was earned in 2023 but ceremoniously accepted in Virginia Beach, Virginia on May 1, 2024. The award was bestowed by retired Rear Adm. Robert J. Bianchi, Chief Executive Officer of the Navy Exchange Service Command and Ron Loman, Senior Vice President of the NEXCOM Hospitality Group during the Global NEXCOM Group Symposium award ceremony. The award was accepted by George Lang who serves as the General Manager for Navy Gateway Inns & Suites in Great Lakes, Illinois.

== Museum ==
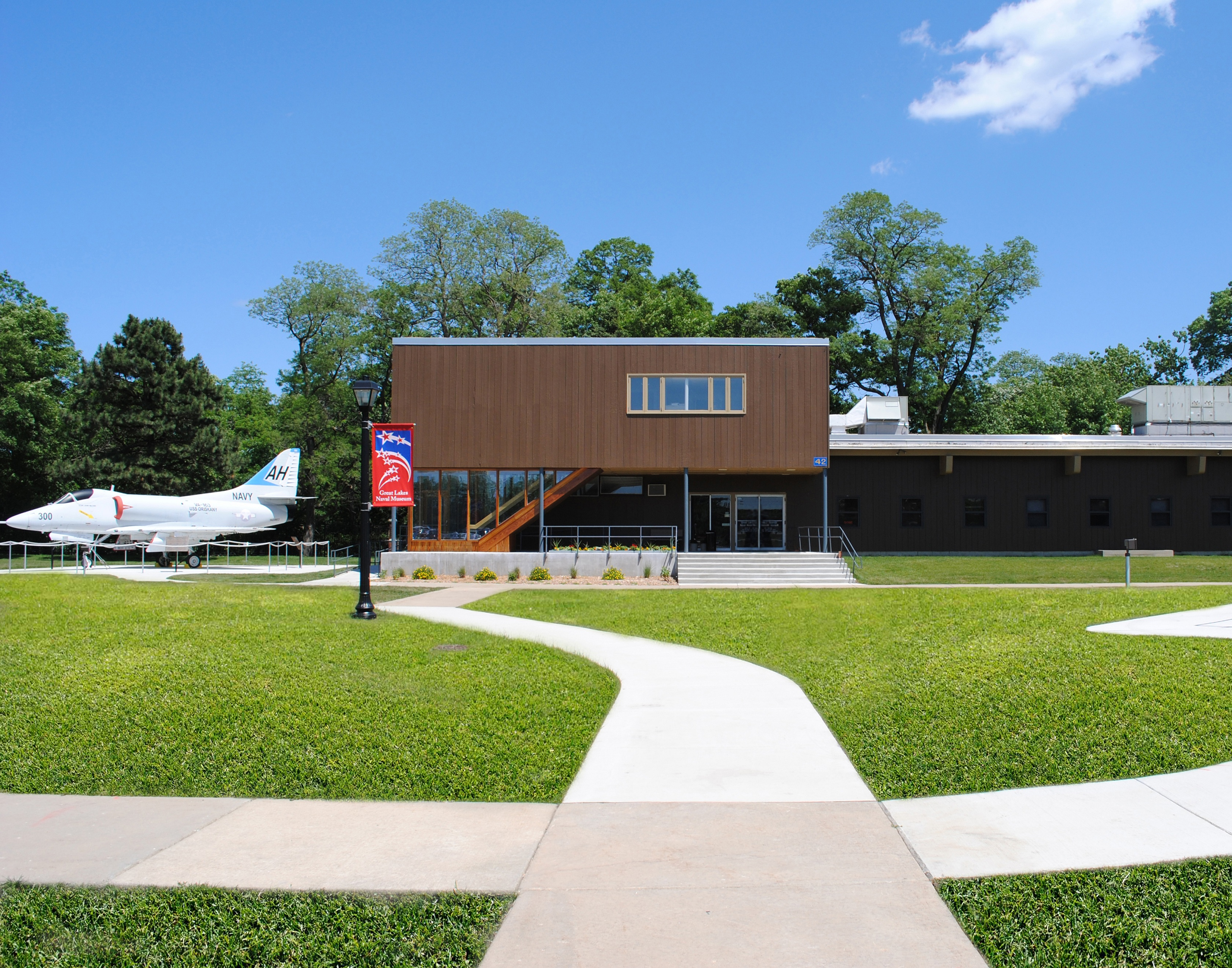
Great Lakes Naval Museum.

The National Museum of the American Sailor is one of the museums operated by the Naval History & Heritage Command. As an official Department of the Navy Museum, the National Museum of the American Sailor's mission is to select, collect, preserve, and interpret the history of the United States Navy with particular emphasis on the Navy's enlisted Sailor.

== See also ==
- United States Naval Training Center Bainbridge
