= Gas turbine system technician =

Gas turbine systems technicians
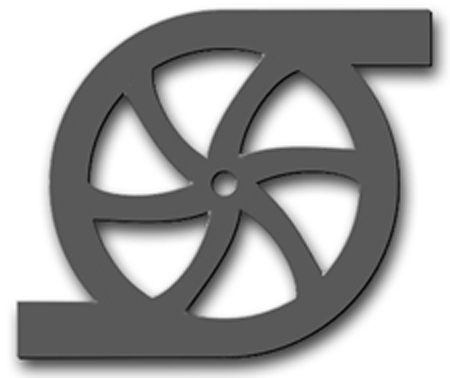
- Rating insignia
- Issued by: United States Navy
- Type: Enlisted rating
- Abbreviation: GS
- Specialty: Engineering

Gas turbine systems technicians (abbreviated as GS) is a United States Navy occupational rating.

== Sub specialty ==
=== Gas turbine systems technicians (electrical) ===
Gas turbine systems technicians (electrical) (GSE) operate, repair, and perform organizational and intermediate maintenance on electrical components of gas turbine engines, main propulsion machinery, auxiliary equipment, propulsion control systems, assigned electrical and electronic circuitry up to the printed circuit and alarm and warning circuitry.

=== Gas turbine systems technicians (mechanical) ===
Gas turbine systems technicians (mechanical) (GSM) operate, repair, and perform organizational and intermediate maintenance on mechanical components of gas turbine engines, main propulsion machinery (including gears, shafts, and controllable pitch propellers), assigned auxiliary equipment and propulsion control systems.

== See also ==
- List of United States Navy ratings
