= The Amazing Race 30 =

Season of television series

- Season 30
- Region 1 DVD cover
- Presented by: Phil Keoghan
- No. of teams: 11
- Winners: Cody Nickson & Jessica Graf
- No. of legs: 12
- Distance traveled: 29,000 mi (47,000 km)
- No. of episodes: 8

Release
- Original network: CBS
- Original release: January 3 – February 21, 2018

Additional information
- Filming dates: October 1 – October 24, 2017

Series chronology
- ← Previous; Season 29 Next → Season 31

The Amazing Race 30 is the thirtieth season of the American reality competition show The Amazing Race. Hosted by Phil Keoghan, it featured eleven teams of two, each with a pre-existing relationship, competing in a race around the world to win US$1,000,000. This season visited four continents and ten countries and traveled over 29,000 miles (47,000 km) during twelve legs. Starting in New York City, racers traveled through Iceland, Belgium, Morocco, France, the Czech Republic, Zimbabwe, Bahrain, Thailand, and Hong Kong before returning to the United States and finishing in the San Francisco Bay Area. New elements introduced in this season include the Head-to-Head, where two teams competed against each other in a task, and a leg where teams swapped partners. The season premiered on CBS on January 3, 2018, and concluded on February 21, 2018.

Dating reality stars Cody Nickson and Jessica Graf (from Big Brother 19) were the winners of this season, while debaters Henry Zhang and Evan Lynyak finished in second place, and professional skiers Kristi Leskinen and Jen Hudak finished in third place.

== Format ==
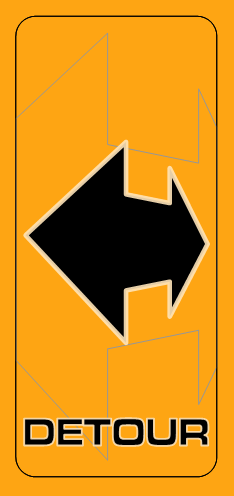
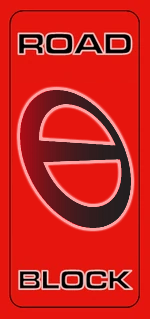
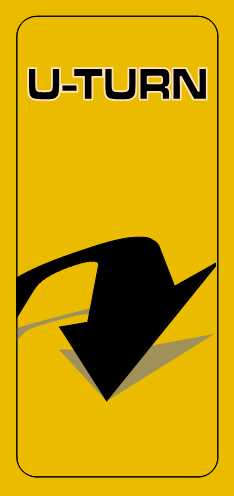
The clues which contestants receive during the course of the race generally fall into four categories: Route Info, Detour, Roadblock, and U-Turn.

The Amazing Race is a reality television show created by Bertram van Munster and Elise Doganieri, and hosted by Phil Keoghan. The series follows teams of two competing in a race around the world. Each leg of the race requires teams to deduce clues, navigate foreign environments, interact with locals, perform physical and mental challenges, and travel on a limited budget provided by the show. At each stop during the leg, teams receive clues inside sealed envelopes, which fall into one of these categories:

- Route Info: These are simple instructions that teams must follow before they can receive their next clue.
- Detour: A Detour is a choice between two tasks. Teams may choose either task and switch tasks if they find one option too difficult. There is usually one Detour present on each leg.
- Roadblock: A Roadblock is a task that only one team member can complete. Teams must choose which member will complete the task based on a brief clue they receive before fully learning the details of the task. There is usually one Roadblock present on each leg.
- U-Turn: The U-Turn allows teams to force another team to complete both options of the Detour before they can continue the race.
- Speed Bump: A penalty for teams who finished in last place on a non-elimination leg. It required the team to complete an additional task in the following leg that only they had to complete.

Most teams who arrive last at the Pit Stop of each leg are progressively eliminated, while the first team to arrive at the finish line in the final episode wins the grand prize of US$1,000,000.

== Contestants ==
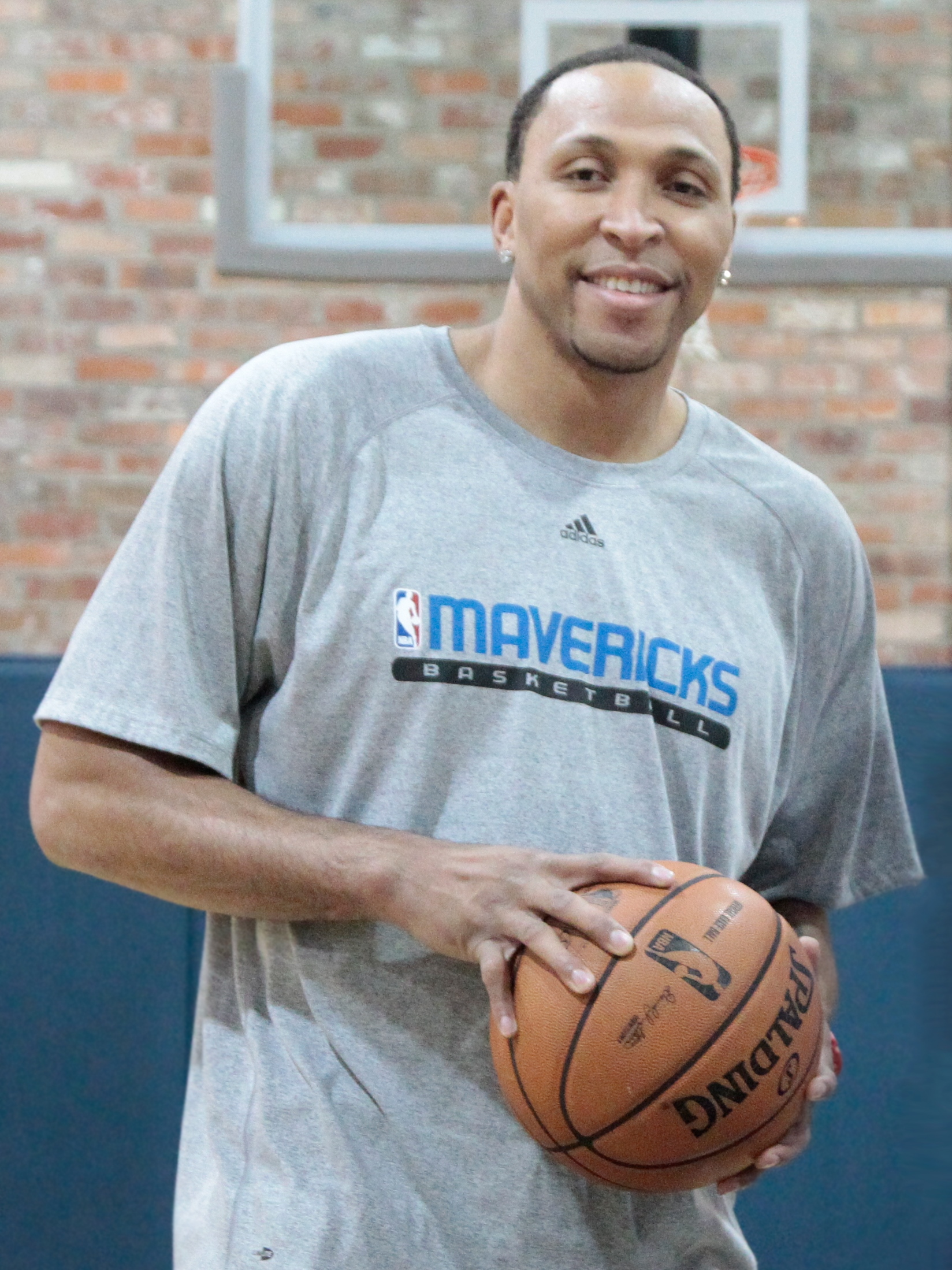
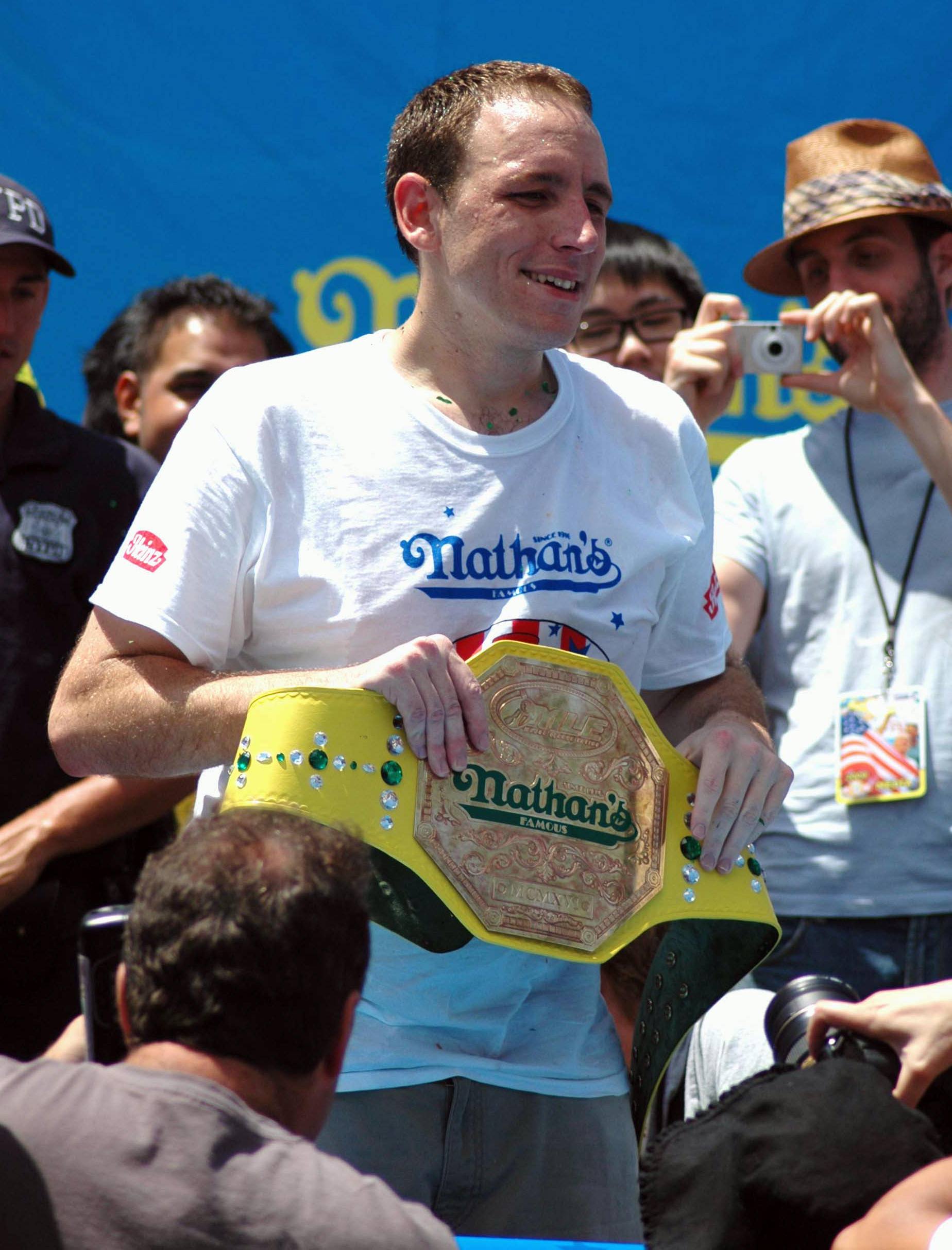
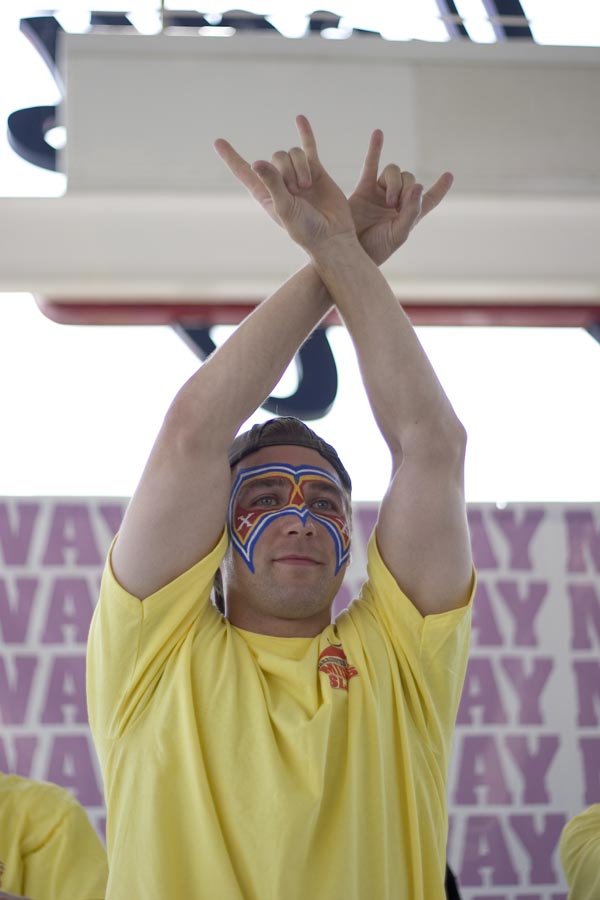
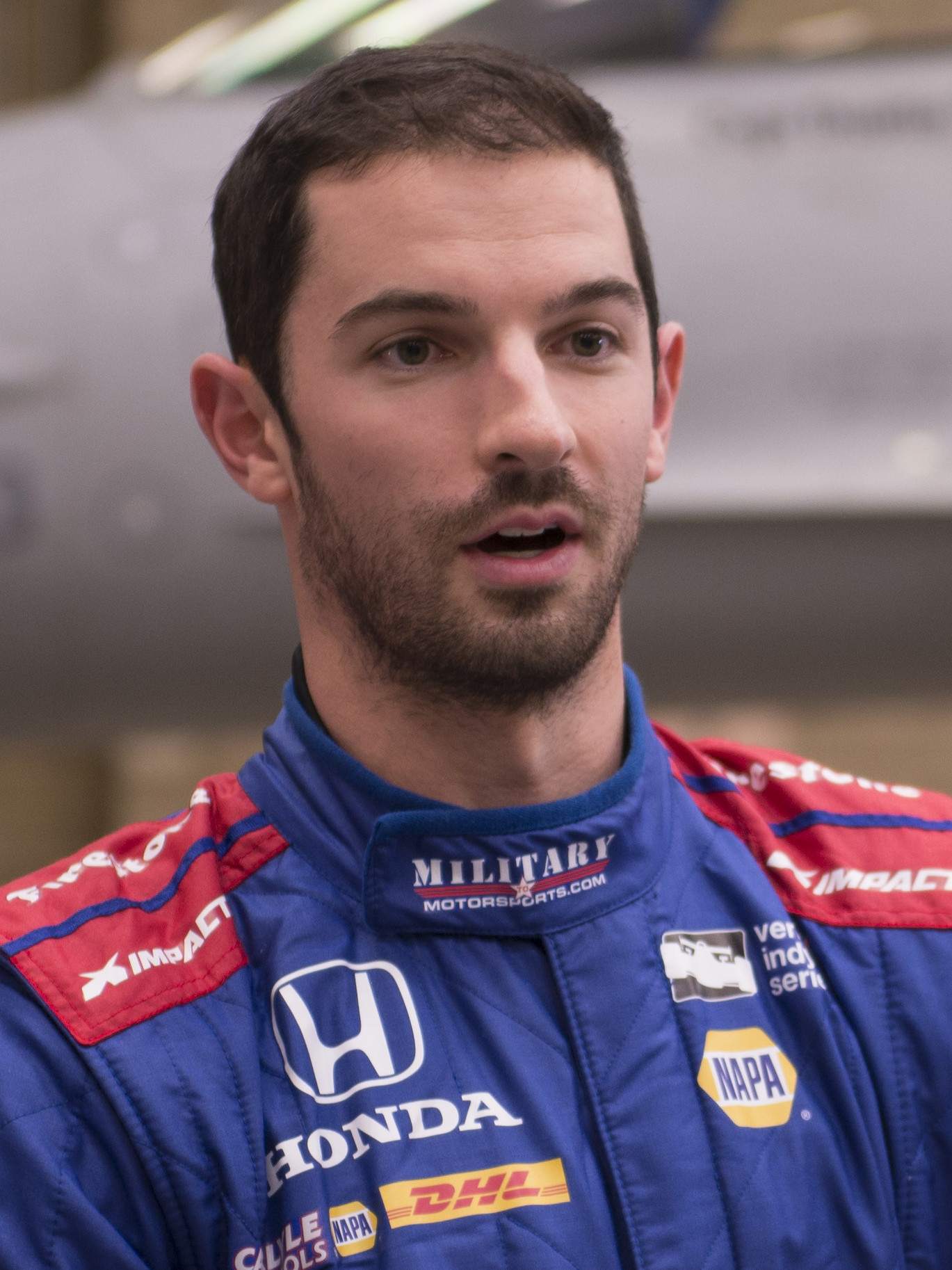
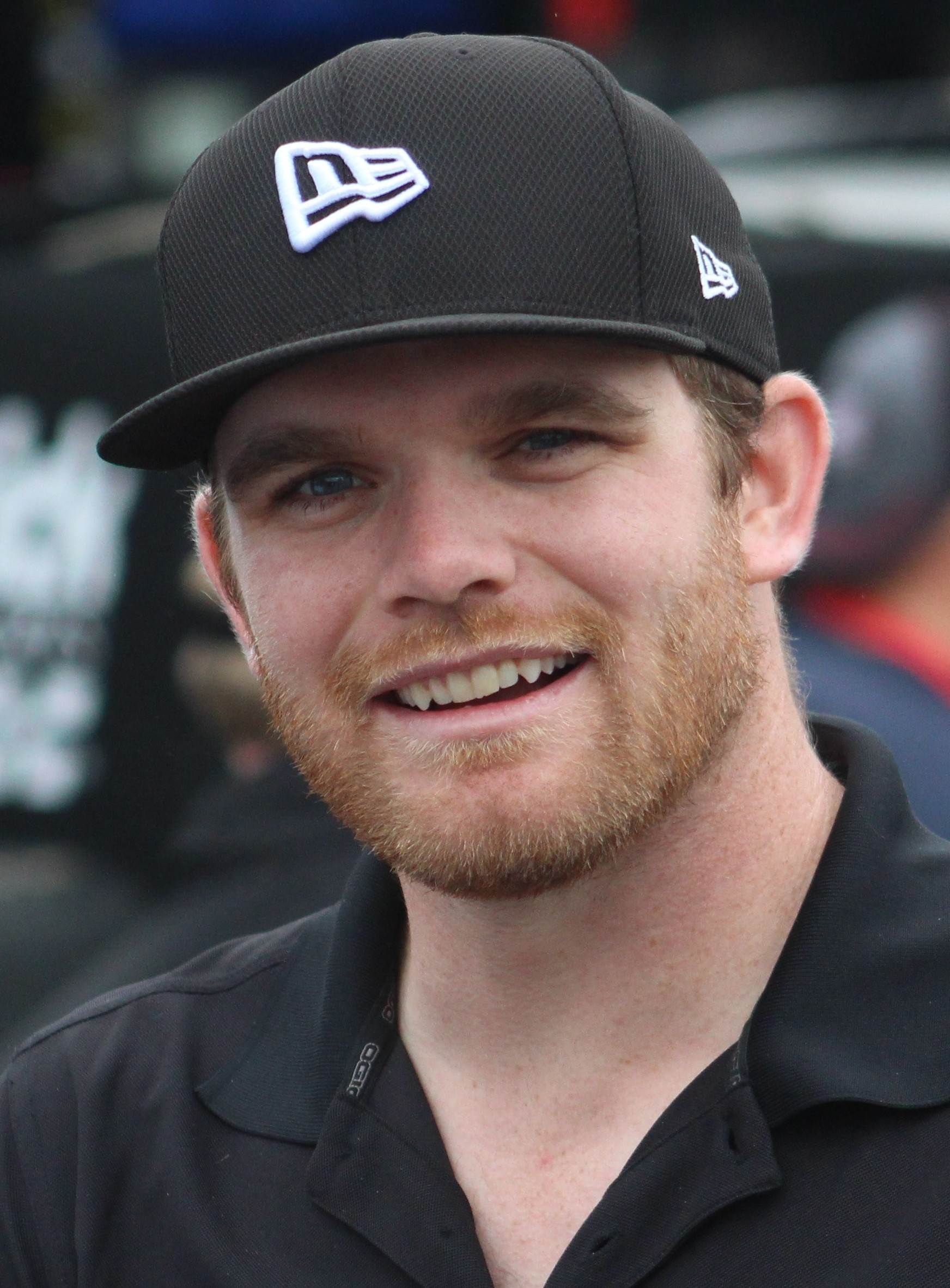
From left to right: Shawn Marion, Joey Chestnut, Tim Janus, Alex Rossi, and Conor Daly

While the team of Big Brother houseguests Jessica Graf and Cody Nickson from the recently concluded season 19 had been announced earlier, the full cast of eleven teams was revealed on December 7, 2017. The cast included former NBA players Cedric Ceballos and Shawn Marion, IndyCar racers Conor Daly and Alexander Rossi, freestyle skiers Kristi Leskinen and Jen Hudak, Well-Strung members Trevor Wadleigh and Chris Marchant, and competitive eaters Joey Chestnut and Tim Janus.

April Gould had previously competed on season 7 and season 9 of American Ninja Warrior, but failed to make it past the qualifier for both seasons.

At the Pit Stop of Leg 5, Lucas Bocanegra proposed to Brittany Austin, who accepted.

| Contestants | Age | Relationship | Hometown | Status |
|---|---|---|---|---|
| Dessie Mitcheson | 27 | Models (The Ring Girls) | Apollo, Pennsylvania | Eliminated 1st (in Reykjavík, Iceland) |
| Kayla Fitzgerald | 26 | Models (The Ring Girls) | Clermont, Florida | Eliminated 1st (in Reykjavík, Iceland) |
| April Gould | 39 | Goat Yoga Moms (Team Goat Yoga) | Gilbert, Arizona | Eliminated 2nd (in Antwerp, Belgium) |
| Sarah Williams | 39 | Goat Yoga Moms (Team Goat Yoga) | Mesa, Arizona | Eliminated 2nd (in Antwerp, Belgium) |
| Cedric Ceballos | 48 | Former NBA Players (Team Slam Dunk) | Maui, Hawaii | Eliminated 3rd (in Saint-Tropez, France) |
| Shawn Marion | 39 | Former NBA Players (Team Slam Dunk) | Chicago, Illinois | Eliminated 3rd (in Saint-Tropez, France) |
| Joey Chestnut | 33 | Competitive Eaters (Team Chomp) | San Jose, California | Eliminated 4th (in Les Baux-de-Provence, France) |
| Tim Janus | 41 | Competitive Eaters (Team Chomp) | New York City, New York | Eliminated 4th (in Les Baux-de-Provence, France) |
| Trevor Wadleigh | 31 | Dating Violinists (Team Well-Strung) | New York City, New York | Eliminated 5th (in Prague, Czech Republic) |
| Chris Marchant | 33 | Dating Violinists (Team Well-Strung) | New York City, New York | Eliminated 5th (in Prague, Czech Republic) |
| Eric Guiffreda | 33 | Twins (The Firefighters) | Ponchatoula, Louisiana | Eliminated 6th (in Harare, Zimbabwe) |
| Daniel Guiffreda | 33 | Twins (The Firefighters) | Ponchatoula, Louisiana | Eliminated 6th (in Harare, Zimbabwe) |
| Lucas Bocanegra | 35 | Dating→Engaged Lifeguards (Team Ocean Rescue) | Miami Springs, Florida | Eliminated 7th (in Muharraq, Bahrain) |
| Brittany Austin | 31 | Dating→Engaged Lifeguards (Team Ocean Rescue) | Miami Springs, Florida | Eliminated 7th (in Muharraq, Bahrain) |
| Alex Rossi | 26 | IndyCar Drivers (Team IndyCar) | Nevada City, California | Eliminated 8th (in Hong Kong) |
| Conor Daly | 25 | IndyCar Drivers (Team IndyCar) | Noblesville, Indiana | Eliminated 8th (in Hong Kong) |
| Kristi Leskinen | 36 | Professional Skiers (Team Extreme) | Scottsdale, Arizona | Third place |
| Jen Hudak | 30 | Professional Skiers (Team Extreme) | Park City, Utah | Third place |
| Henry Zhang | 22 | Dating Debaters (Team Yale) | Los Angeles, California | Runners-up |
| Evan Lynyak | 22 | Dating Debaters (Team Yale) | Los Angeles, California | Runners-up |
| Cody Nickson | 33 | Dating Reality Stars (Team Big Brother) | Plano, Texas | Winners |
| Jessica Graf | 28 | Dating Reality Stars (Team Big Brother) | Los Angeles, California | Winners |

Future appearances

Cody & Jessica appeared on the premiere of Celebrity Big Brother 1, and also on the seventh episode of Big Brother 20, during which they hosted a Power of Veto competition and announced their engagement.

== Contestant progress ==
The following teams are listed with their placements in each leg. Placements are listed in finishing order.

- A red placement with a dagger (†) indicates that the team was eliminated.
- An underlined blue placement with a double-dagger (‡) indicates that the team was the last to arrive at a Pit Stop in a non-elimination leg, and had to perform a Speed Bump task in the following leg.
- An italicized and underlined placement indicates that the team was the last to arrive at a Pit Stop, but there was no rest period at the Pit Stop and all teams were instructed to continue racing. There was no required Speed Bump task in the next leg.
- A brown ⊃ indicates that the team used the U-Turn and a brown ⊂ indicates the team on the receiving end of the U-Turn.
- A violet + indicates that teams had to swap partners with another team for the majority of that leg.

Team placement (by leg)
| Team | 1 | 2 | 3 | 4 | 5 | 6 | 7+ (Note: Teams had to swap partners for the majority of this leg. The swapped teams and their placements were as follows: 1st: Cody & Jen; 2nd: Brittany & Alex; 3rd: Lucas & Conor; 4th: Daniel & Evan; 5th: Eric & Henry; 6th: Jessica & Kristi) | 8 | 9 | 10 | 11 | 12 |
|---|---|---|---|---|---|---|---|---|---|---|---|---|
| Cody & Jessica | 2nd | 1st | 5th | 2nd | 6th | 6th⊃ (Note: Cody & Jessica chose to use the U-Turn on Trevor & Chris.) | 5th (Note: This team arrived last at the Pit Stop, but they were instructed to continue racing.) | 5th⊂ (Note: Lucas & Brittany chose to use the U-Turn on Cody & Jessica.) | 4th | 2nd | 2nd | 1st |
| Henry & Evan | 3rd | 8th | 1st | 6th | 4th | 3rd | 3rd | 4th⊂ (Note: Alex & Conor chose to use the U-Turn on Henry & Evan.) | 3rd | 4th‡ | 1st | 2nd |
| Kristi & Jen | 1st | 3rd | 3rd | 3rd | 2nd | 1st | 5th | 2nd | 2nd | 3rd | 3rd | 3rd |
| Alex & Conor | 5th | 5th | 2nd | 1st | 5th | 4th | 1st | 3rd⊃ | 1st | 1st | 4th† | |
| Lucas & Brittany | 7th | 6th | 8th | 8th | 1st | 5th | 1st | 1st⊃ | 5th† | | | |
| Eric & Daniel | 8th | 9th | 7th | 7th | 3rd | 2nd | 3rd | 6th† | | | | |
| Trevor & Chris | 4th | 4th | 4th | 5th | 7th | 7th†⊂ | | | | | | |
| Joey & Tim | 6th | 7th | 6th | 4th | 8th† | | | | | | | |
| Cedric & Shawn | 9th (Note: Cedric & Shawn initially arrived 8th, but were issued a 30-minute penalty, because Cedric provided assistance at the Roadblock. Eric & Daniel checked in during this penalty time, dropping Cedric & Shawn to 9th.) | 2nd | 9th‡ | 9th† | | | | | | | | |
| April & Sarah | 10th | 10th† | | | | | | | | | | |
| Dessie & Kayla | 11th† | | | | | | | | | | | |

== Race summary ==
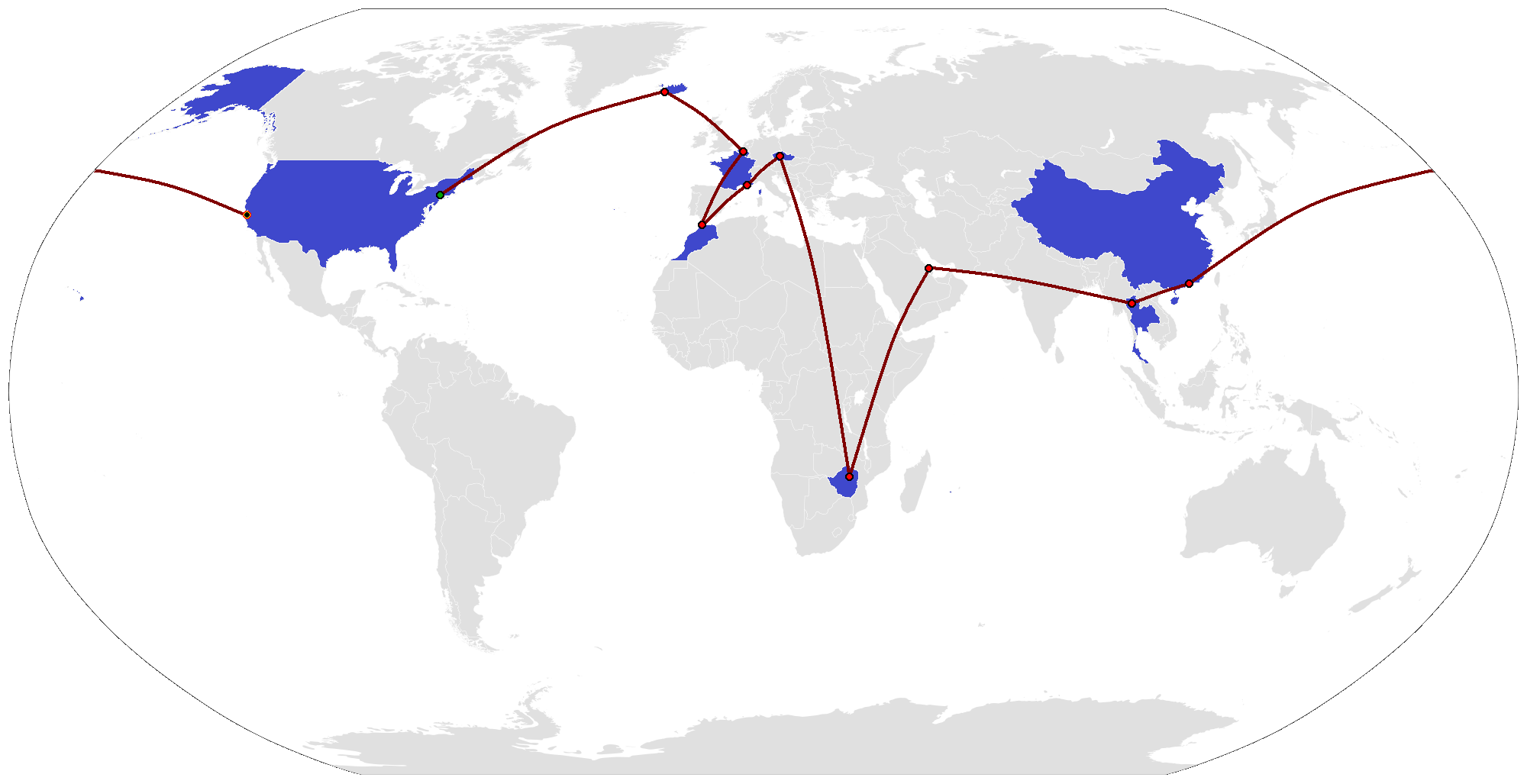
The route of The Amazing Race 30.

| Destinations | Air travel Rail travel Water travel Bus travel Helicopter travel Bicycle travel Gondola travel |
| Route Markers | Detour Roadblock Head-to-Head U-Turn Speed Bump Pit Stop |

=== Leg 1 (United States → Iceland) ===
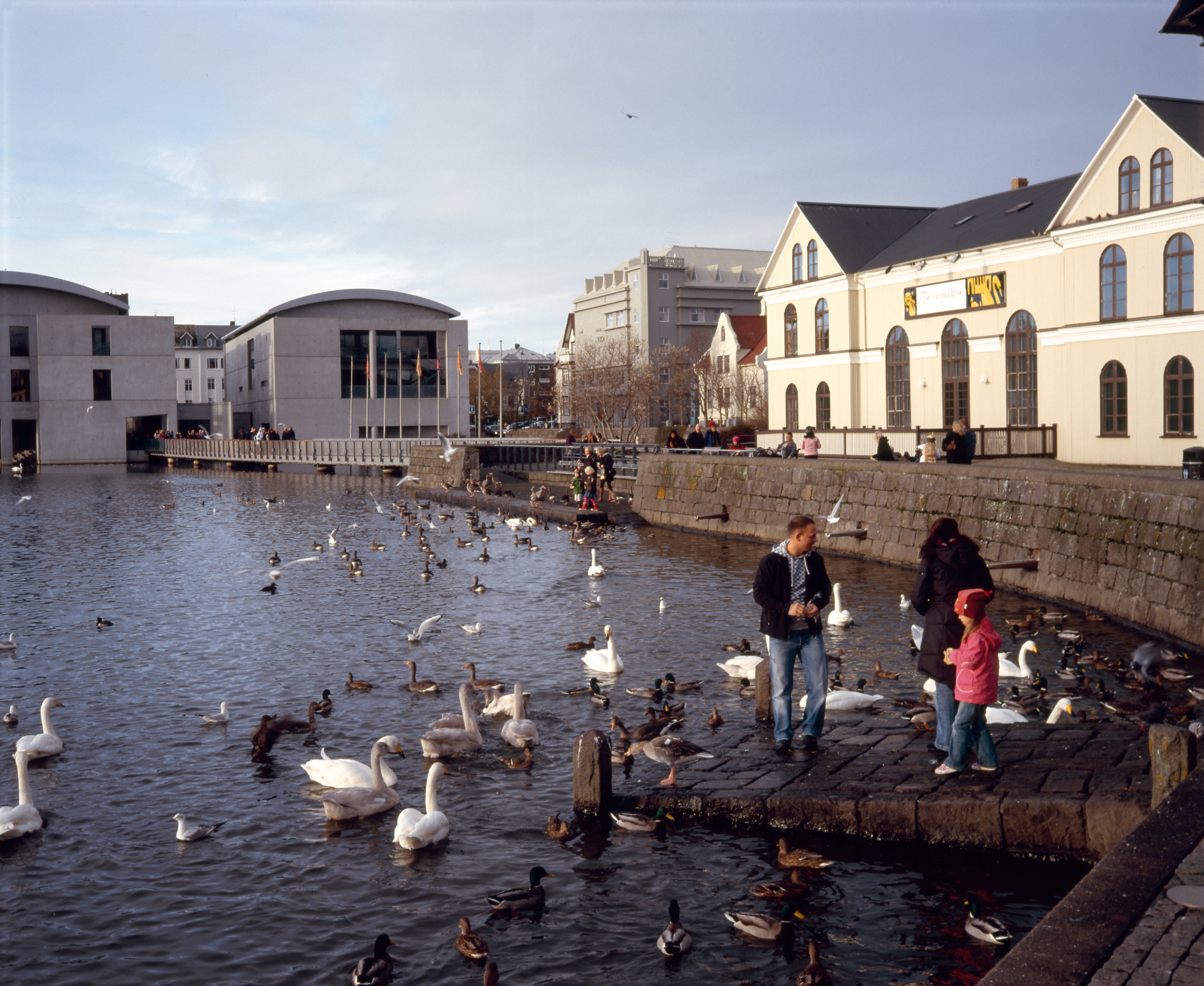
Teams ended the first leg in Iceland at Iðnaðarmannahúsið, on the shore of Lake Tjörnin in Downtown Reykjavík.

- Episode 1: "You're a Champion, Prove It" (January 3, 2018)
- Prize: A trip for two to Santorini, Greece (awarded to Kristi & Jen)
- Eliminated: Dessie & Kayla

Locations

- New York City, New York (Washington Square Park) (Starting Line)
- New York City → Reykjavík, Iceland
- Húsafell (Geitárgljúfur)
- Mosfellsbær (Esjumelar)
- Reykjavík (Ingólfstorg)
- Reykjavík (Reykjavíkurtjörn – Iðnaðarmannahúsið)

Episode summary

- Teams had to find their first clue below the waterline of the fountain at Washington Square Park instructing them to fly to Reykjavík, Iceland. Once there, teams had to drive to the Geitárgljùfur, where one team member had to pull themselves along a zipline high above the Geitá river canyon until they could retrieve an Icelandic flag suspended from the line. After grabbing the flag, their partner had to pull them back to the canyon's edge so they could exchange the flag for their next clue. Teams then had to drive to Esjumelar in order to find their next clue.
- In this season's first Roadblock, one team member had to ride in an off-road buggy driven by a professional driver in the foothills of Mount Esja. Without taking notes, the team member had to memorize eleven Icelandic letters placed along the riverbed and that each letter had a number denoting its order in the solution. They then had to arrange tiles with those letters in the correct order to spell out their next destination – Ingólfstorg – in order to receive their next clue.
- After driving to Ingólfstorg, teams had to find a group of strongmen, where CrossFit Games champion Katrín Davíðsdóttir asked teams two questions about two national tonics. When teams were able to provide the correct answers, one team member had to drink a shot of Brennivín and the other a shot of Þorskalýsi (cod liver oil) in order to receive their next clue, which directed them to the Pit Stop: the Iðnaðarmannahúsið along Reykjavíkurtjörn.

Additional notes

- At John F. Kennedy International Airport, teams had to book one of two flights to Reykjavík. The seven teams on the first flight arrived 30 minutes ahead of the remaining four teams were on the second flight. This task went unaired in the episode.
- Miss Iceland Ólafía Ósk Finnsdóttir appeared as the Pit Stop greeter during this leg.
- The race to the Pit Stop mat between Dessie & Kayla and April & Sarah was the closest finish in the history of The Amazing Race. Production had to review video footage to determine which of the two teams actually arrived on the Pit Stop mat first. Phil Keoghan stated: "We have never had a finish this close."

=== Leg 2 (Iceland → Netherlands → Belgium) ===
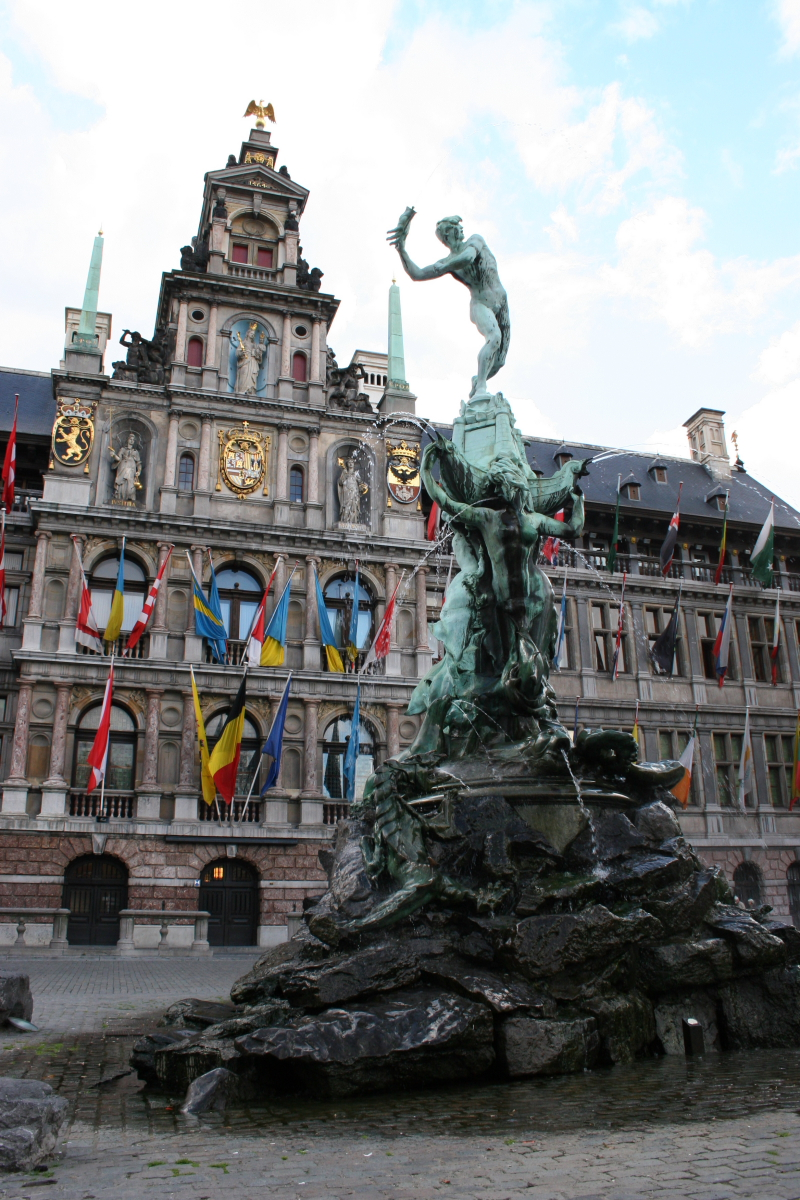
Grote Markt in Antwerp, in the shadow of Brabo Fountain and City Hall, hosted the very first Head-to-Head and the second Pit Stop.

- Episode 2: "You're the Best French Fry Ever" (January 10, 2018)
- Prize: US$2,500 each (awarded to Cody & Jessica)
- Eliminated: April & Sarah

Locations

- Reykjavík (Reykjavíkurtjörn – Iðnaðarmannahúsið)
- Reykjavík (Kilroy Travel)
- Reykjavík → Amsterdam, Netherlands
- Amsterdam → Antwerp, Belgium
- Antwerp (Paleis op de Meir – The Chocolate Line)
- Antwerp (Willemdok)
- Antwerp (Plantin-Moretus Museum or Diamond Quarter – ADC Building)
- Antwerp (Grote Markt)

Episode summary

- At the start of this leg, teams were instructed to fly to Amsterdam, Netherlands, and then travel by train to Antwerp, Belgium. Once there, teams traveled to The Chocolate Line, where a chocolatier gave them their next clue.
- In this leg's Roadblock, teams had to travel to Antwerp's waterfront and find the "SkyClimb", a crane with four suspended rope ladders. One team member had to climb to the top of a free hanging ladder while a crane raised the racers upwards in order to retrieve their next clue before the ride ended.
- This season's first Detour was a choice between Old Print or Diamond Glint. In Old Print, teams traveled to the Plantin-Moretus Museum, where they had to arrange type pieces following the example of a provided clue, keeping in mind that the type pieces needed to be arranged as a mirror image of their clue. They then had to carry their template to be printed using a printing press and were given the message as their next clue if it printed correctly. In Diamond Glint, teams traveled to the ADC Building in the Antwerp diamond district, where they had to calculate the value of three diamonds based on their carat, color, and clarity and then add the value to the price of an unfinished necklace in order to receive their next clue.
- After the Detour, teams were given a clue, written in Dutch, that required them to "go to a large public place where [they would] find the city hall and Silvius Brabo", directing them to the Grote Markt.
- In the series' first Head-to-Head, two teams had to compete against each other in a "Frietrace". After both members of each team donned French fry costumes, each team had to nominate one member to run an obstacle course while pushing a dolly carrying eight bags of fries. A team could immediately check in at the nearby Pit Stop after winning a heat, while the losing team had to wait until the next team arrived. The team that lost the final heat was eliminated.

Additional note

- Due to limited availability of flights, teams were given tickets on a set of pre-arranged flights to Amsterdam that they had to pick up at Kilroy Travel, but they were under no obligation to use them.

=== Leg 3 (Belgium → Netherlands → Morocco) ===
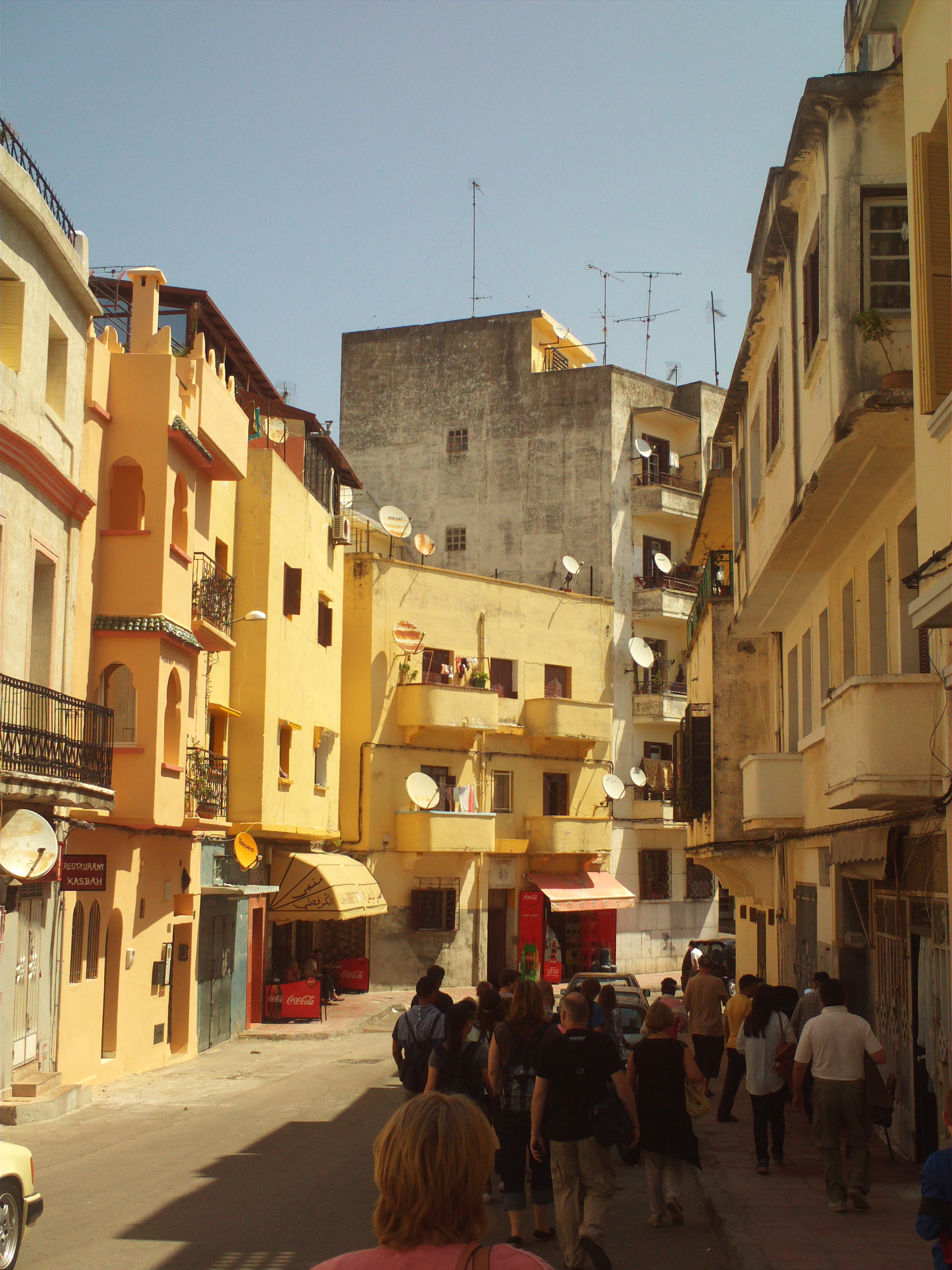
The tasks in Tangier were focused in the old Medina quarter and its narrow alleyways.

- Episode 3: "It's Gonna Be a Fragrant Day" (January 17, 2018)
- Prize: A trip for two to Zurich, Switzerland (awarded to Henry & Evan)

Locations

- Antwerp (Grote Markt)
- Antwerp → Amsterdam, Netherlands
- Amsterdam → Tangier, Morocco
- Tangier (Medina Fish Port)
- Tangier (Kisariate Jbala Souk)
- Tangier (American Legation Museum, Kasbah Museum & Tele Boutique)
- Tangier (Grand Socco or Mamounia Palace Restaurant)
- Tangier (Moulay Hafid Palace)

Episode summary

- At the start of this leg, teams were instructed to travel by train back to Amsterdam, Netherlands, and then fly to Tangier, Morocco. Once there, teams had to travel to the Medina fishing port, where they had to find a marked crate of fish, transfer the fish into a basket, and then arrange all of the fish as shown in an example in order to receive their next clue. Teams then had to travel on foot into the Medina quarter and find the Kisariate Jbala Souk, where they had to greet a merchant with the Arabic greeting of As-salām Alaykum (السَّلَامُ عَلَيْكُمْ). They then received their next clue and a Travelocity Roaming Gnome.
- In this leg's Roadblock, one team member had go to the roof of the American Legation Museum and send their gnome over the city to another rooftop via zipline. Racers had to navigate the narrow streets and find the roof where their gnome landed, where they were instructed to travel to the Kasbah Museum and perform the same task again. After finding their gnome for a second time, racers were instructed to find a payphone at a Tele Boutique and use the coins in the gnome's pouch to listen to the phone for the Arabic phrase for "Good Morning": Sabah al-khair (صباح الخير). After repeating this phrase to the shopkeeper, he handed the racers their next clue, which they could only open after reuniting with their partner.
- This leg's Detour was a choice between Drop it Off or Shake it Off. In Drop it Off, teams had to travel to a food truck and deliver crates of food by dragging them along the ground to three locations, where they received a receipt stamped with one of the three words in the name of the Pit Stop that they could exchange for their next clue. In Shake it Off, teams had to travel to the Manounia Palace Restaurant, don traditional belly dancing attire, and then dance in the restaurant while searching for the same three words that they had to repeat to the waiter in order to receive their next clue.
- After the Detour, teams had to check in at the Pit Stop: the Moulay Hafid Palace.

Additional note

- This was a non-elimination leg.

=== Leg 4 (Morocco → France) ===
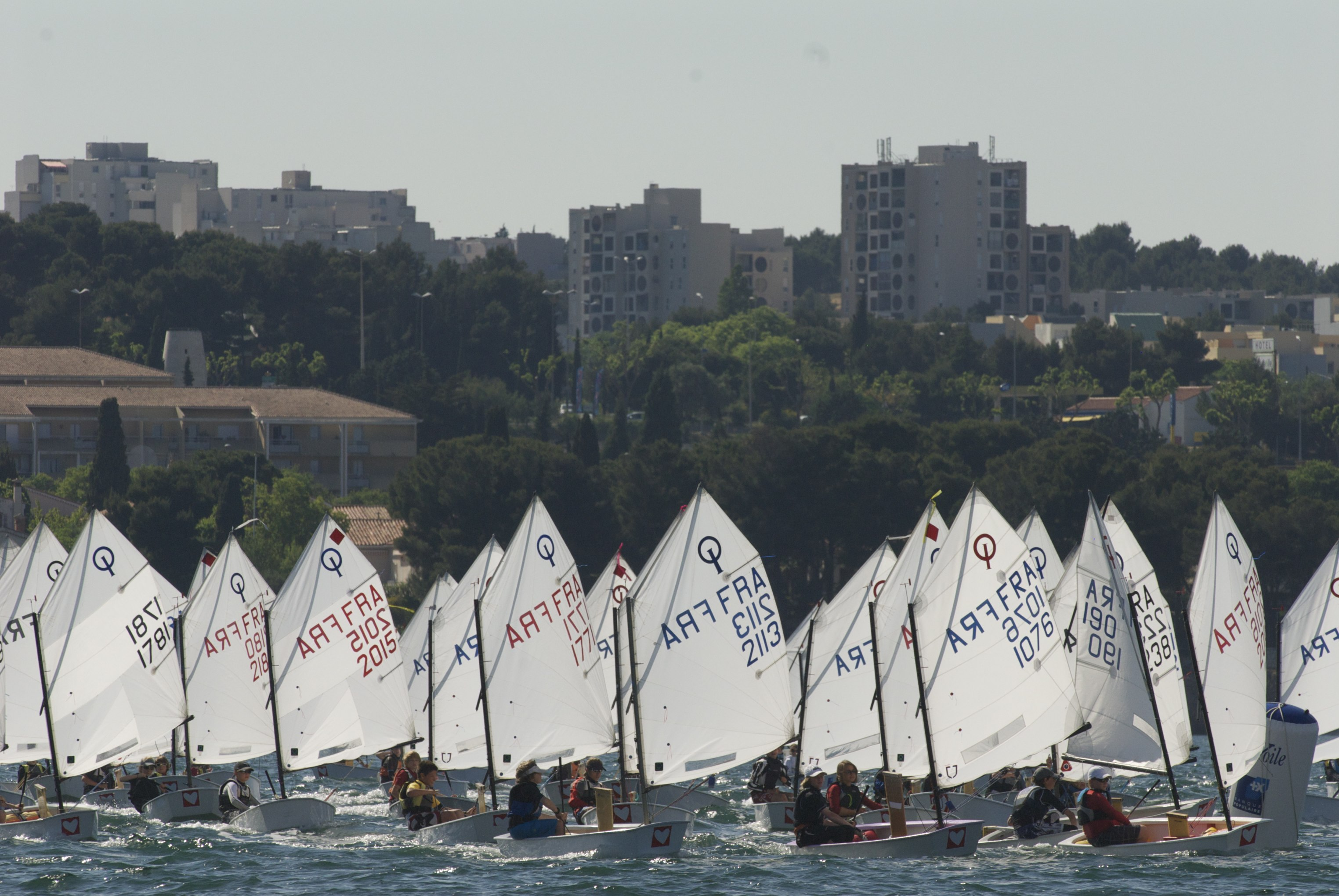
The Roadblock in Saint-Tropez had racers sailing Optimist dinghies to get their clue.

- Episode 4: "Gotta Put Your Sole into it" (January 24, 2018)
- Prize: US$5,000 each (awarded to Alex & Conor)
- Eliminated: Cedric & Shawn

Locations

- Tangier (Moulay Hafid Palace)
- Tangier → Nice, France
- Saint-Tropez (Sailing School Water Company de Saint-Tropez)
- Saint-Tropez (La Tarte Tropézienne or Sandales Tropéziennes)
- Saint-Tropez (Place des Lices)

Episode summary

- At the start of this leg, teams were instructed to fly to Nice, France. Once there, teams had to drive to the Sailing School Water Company in Saint-Tropez.
- For their Speed Bump, Cedric & Shawn had to stack a set of fifteen Optimist dinghies in numerical order before they could continue racing.
- In this leg's Roadblock, one member had to attach a sail to an Optimist dinghy and then sail across the bay with the boat's rudder removed to a set of two buoys, each of which contained one half of their next clue. Once they had the two halves, they could return to the shore to reunite with their partner and open their next clue.
- This leg's Detour was a choice between Bread or Tread. In Bread, teams traveled to La Tarte Tropézienne, where had to form 50 baguettes from 30 pounds (14 kg) of dough to the satisfaction of the baker. In Tread, teams traveled to Sandales Tropéziennes, where each team member had to correctly make a sandal. After either task, teams had to deliver a baked baguette or a finished pair of sandals to a person in a restaurant in order to receive their next clue.
- In this leg's Head-to-Head at the Place des Lices, two teams competed in a game of pétanque. Each team member rolled three metal boules to try to get it as close as possible to a smaller ball on the field known as a jack. Once all team members had taken their turns, the team whose ball was closest was the winner and could check in at the nearby Pit Stop. The team that lost the final game was eliminated.

=== Leg 5 (France) ===
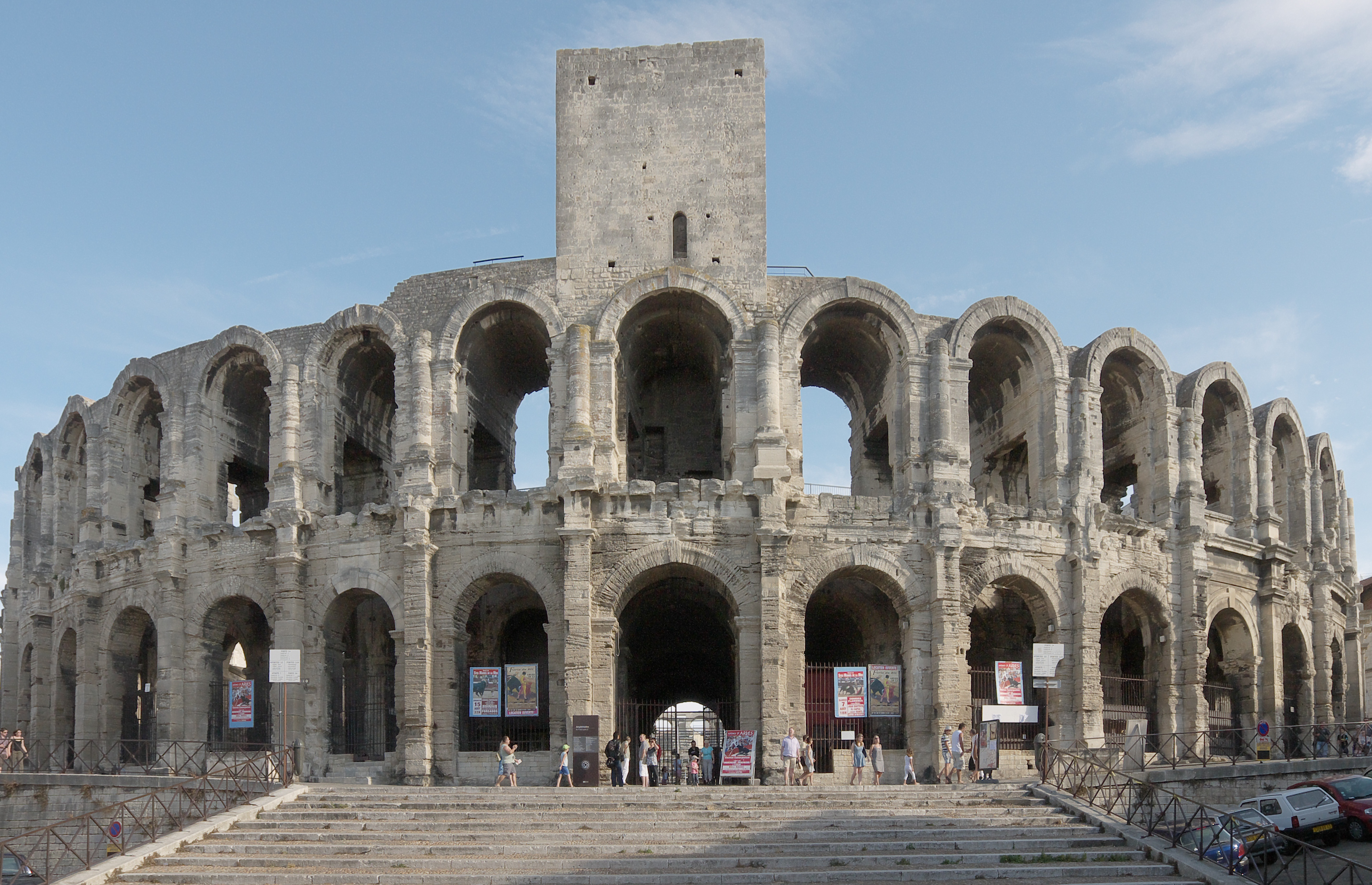
One half of the Detour in Provence had teams visiting the Arles Amphitheatre.

- Episode 4: "Gotta Put Your Sole into it" (January 24, 2018)
- Prize: A trip for two to Bali, Indonesia (awarded to Lucas & Brittany)
- Eliminated: Joey & Tim

Locations

- Saint-Tropez (Place des Lices)
- Les Baux-de-Provence (Château des Baux)
- Maussane-les-Alpilles (Café de la Fontaine)
- Arles (Arles Amphitheatre or Pont Van Gogh)
- Les Baux-de-Provence (Hotel Benvengudo)

Episode summary

- At the start of this leg, teams had to drive to the Château des Baux in Les Baux-de-Provence.
- In this leg's Roadblock, one team member had to correctly build a trebuchet from supplied parts and following a provided example in order to receive their next clue.
- After the Roadblock, teams drove to the Café de la Fontaine, where they had to find a patron drinking red wine with their next clue.
- This leg's Detour was a choice between Full of Bull or Colorful. In Full of Bull, teams had to check satchels on 100 artificial bulls scattered around the stands of the Arles Amphitheatre to find a total of three ribbons, one in each of the colors of the French flag (blue, white, and red), and exchange them for their next clue. In Colorful, teams traveled to the Pont Van Gogh. There, they found a replica of one of Vincent van Gogh's paintings of the Langlois Bridge at Arles, which was actually an elaborate sliding puzzle that required teams to slide elements of the painting in a specific sequence in order to unlock the easel and retrieve their clue inside.
- After the Detour, teams had to check in at the Pit Stop: the Hotel Benvengudo in Les Baux-de-Provence.

Additional note

- Legs 4 and 5 aired back-to-back as a special two-hour episode.

=== Leg 6 (France → Czech Republic) ===
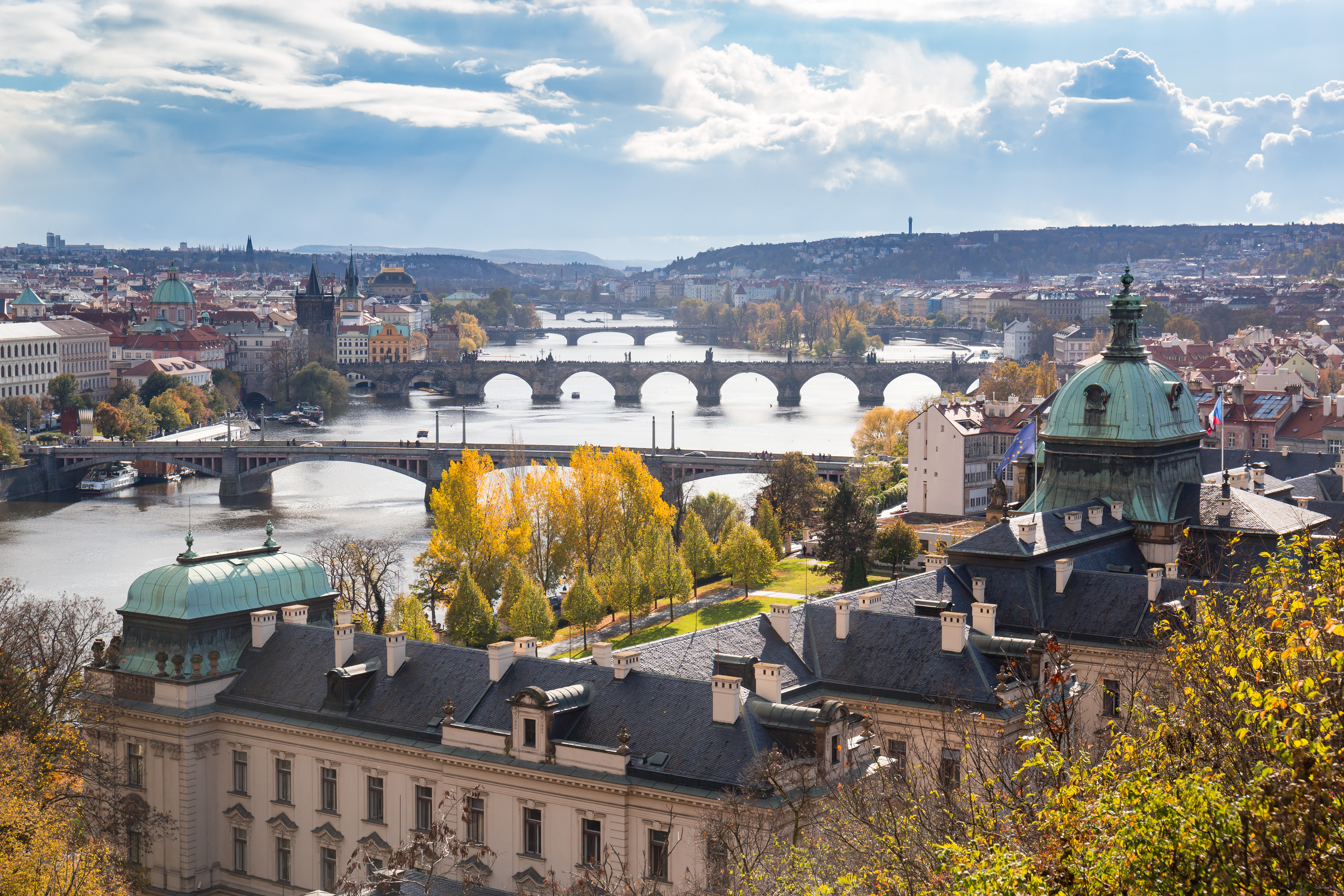
Teams ended this leg in Prague on the hilltop of Letenské Park, overlooking the Vltava River and Prague's Old Town.

- Episode 5: "The Claws Are Out" (January 31, 2018)
- Prize: A trip for two to Perth, Australia (awarded to Kristi & Jen)
- Eliminated: Trevor & Chris

Locations

- Arles (Église Notre Dame de la Major)
- Marseille → Prague, Czech Republic
- Prague (Rudolfinum)
- Prague (Staropramen Brewery & Náplavka – Fidelio or Charles University)
- Prague (Andělská Lázeň Beer Spa)
- Prague (Stará Čistírna Odpadních Vod)
- Prague (Letenské Park)

Episode summary

- At the start of this leg, teams were instructed to use a mobile app to book a flight to Prague, Czech Republic. Once there, teams had to find their next clue at the Rudolfinum.
- This leg's Detour was a Blind Detour, where teams only learned about the task once they reached its location, and was a choice between This or That. In This, teams traveled to the Staropramen Brewery, where they had to properly re-stack a pallet of empty beer kegs, searching for the one keg that was full. They then had to tap the keg and properly pour a mug of beer to the satisfaction of the brewmaster. Once approved, they had to deliver the keg to the Fidelio, a floating vessel docked alongside the Náplavka Riverbank on the Vltava River. In That, teams traveled to the astronomy hall at Charles University, where they had to listen to two lecturers in English, one debating that the Earth is round and the other that the Earth is flat. Without taking any notes, they then had to pass an oral exam by answering eight questions correctly in order to receive their next clue.
- After the Detour, teams traveled to the Andělská Lázeň Beer Spa and received their next clue from patrons bathing in beer. Teams then had to find their next clue outside Stará Čistírna Odpadních Vod.
- The leg's Roadblock was a Switchback from season 15, where one team member had to enter a kafkaesque room filled with hundreds of ringing telephones and search for the eight that had a person on the other end of the line. The voice on each phone said one word of a Franz Kafka quote: "The meaning of life is that it stops". Without taking notes, racers had to memorize the eight words and then arrange them in the correct order on a lengthy form in order to receive their next clue.
- Teams had to check in at the Pit Stop: Letenské Park.

Additional note

- Cody & Jessica chose to use the U-Turn on Trevor & Chris.

=== Leg 7 (Czech Republic → Zimbabwe) ===
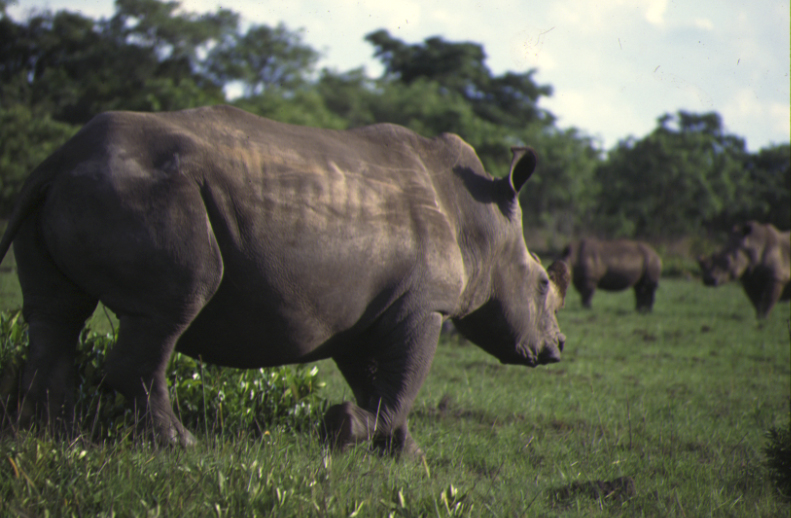
In rural Zimbabwe, teams traveled to the Imire Rhino & Wildlife Conservancy and ran most of this leg with a swapped partner for the first time.

- Episode 6: "All's Fair in Love and War" (February 7, 2018)

Locations

- Prague (Letenské Park)
- Prague (TYP Agency)
- Prague → Harare, Zimbabwe
- Harare → Marondera
- Mashonaland East Province (Imire Rhino & Wildlife Conservancy)
- Mashonaland East Province (Imire Rhino & Wildlife Conservancy – Imire Lake)
- Mashonaland East Province (Imire Rhino & Wildlife Conservancy – Lookout Tower)
- Mashonaland East Province (Imire Rhino & Wildlife Conservancy – Savanna Plains Overlook)

Episode summary

- At the start of this leg, teams were instructed to fly to Harare, Zimbabwe, with teams required to book their flight at TYP Agency. Once there, teams had to travel by train to Marondera and then travel to the Imire Rhino & Wildlife Conservancy, where they had to properly set up a provided safari tent and spend the night. They were woken up by Phil Keoghan at 4:00 a.m., and he explained that for the remainder of the leg, they had to switch partners with another team. The swapped teams were as follows: Cody & Jen; Brittany & Alex; Lucas & Conor; Daniel & Evan; Eric & Henry; and Jessica & Kristi.
- The newly formed teams then had to paddle a makeshift raft around Imire Lake in order to spot their next clue, which was in a pair of canteens hanging in a tree. When they found the canteens, they could paddle to their next destination.
- This leg's Detour was a choice between Rhino Track or Bush Whack. In Rhino Track, teams had to ride horses with a guide along a marked path through the reserve, spotting and collecting eight pieces of evidence along the way left behind by "poachers" in designated locations. Once they collected all eight pieces, they returned to the starting point and had to correctly place the items on a map matching their respective locations in order to receive their next clue. In Bush Whack, teams had to drive an off-road vehicle along a marked course to pick up supplies, including a full canteen of water, at a designated point. The course then continued through two mud bogs, which they had to wade through in order to determine the best place to cross, and then drive the vehicle through the bogs without getting stuck. Once through, teams arrived at a ranger station, where they had to dig up an empty canteen and bury the full one they picked up earlier in its place. After returning to the starting point, teams received their next clue.
- After the Detour, teams had to check in at the Pit Stop: the savanna plains overlook. Teams had to wait for their original partners to arrive and reunite with them before they could check in. Additionally, Phil informed the newly reunited teams that the next leg had begun, and they were given their next clue.

=== Leg 8 (Zimbabwe) ===
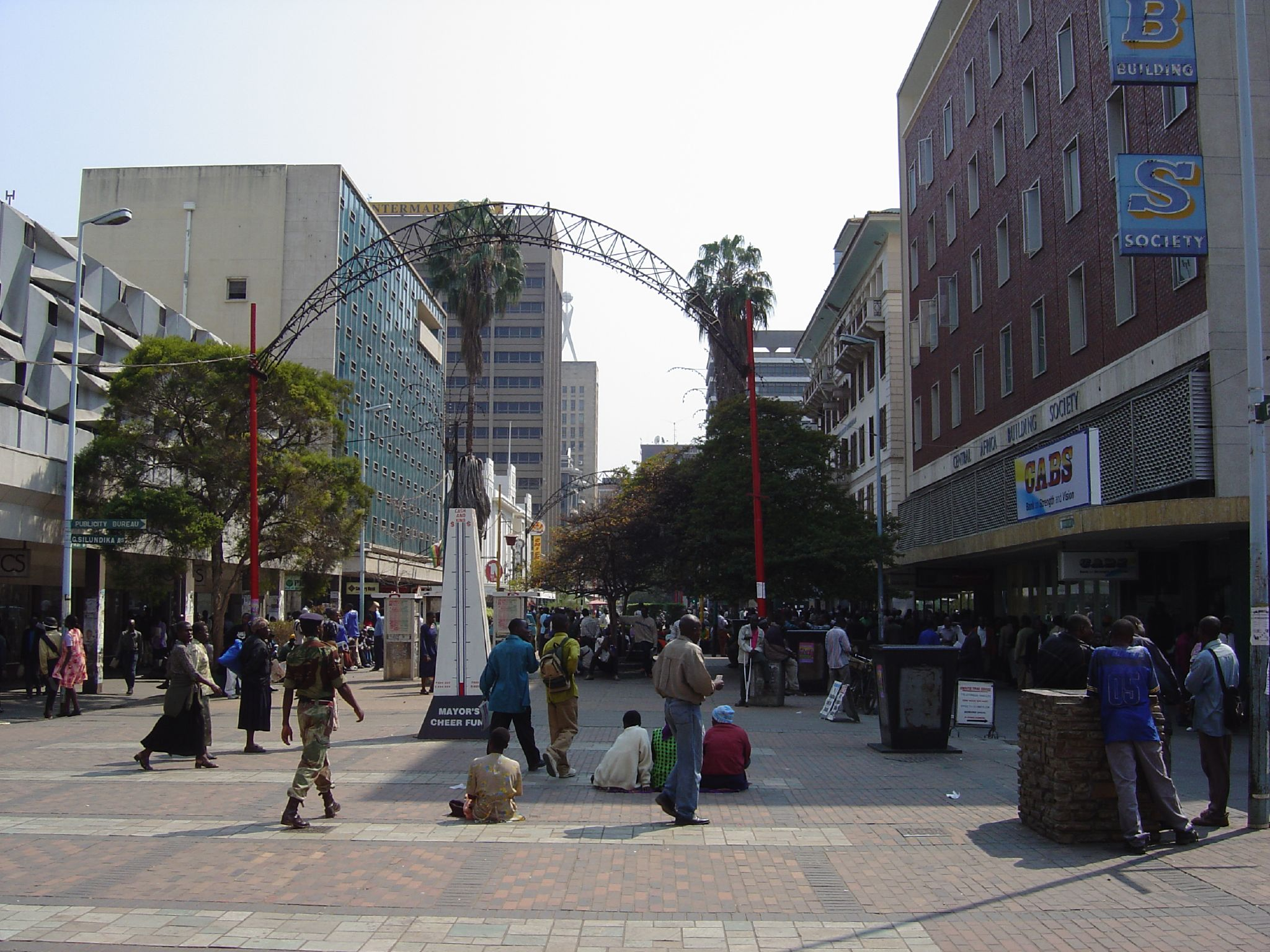
Teams ended the eighth leg in the Zimbabwean capital of Harare at the First Street Pedestrian Mall.

- Episode 6: "All's Fair in Love and War" (February 7, 2018)
- Prize: A trip for two to Saint Lucia (awarded to Lucas & Brittany)
- Eliminated: Eric & Daniel

Locations

- Harare (Khan Fabrics, Haberdashery, and Sports)
- Harare (Eastgate Mall or Magaba Tyres & Cameron Hardware)
- Harare (Harare Gardens)
- Harare (First Street Pedestrian Mall)

Episode summary

- At the start of this leg, teams were instructed to return to Harare and find their next clue at Khan Fabrics, Haberdashery, and Sports.
- This leg's Detour was a choice between Handle with Care or Just Get it There. In Handle with Care, teams traveled to Eastgate Mall, where they went to the mail room and received seven large packages to carry and deliver to various businesses around the mall. After delivering each, they were given outgoing mail that they had to return to the mail room. Once all of the deliveries were complete, teams received their next clue. In Just Get it There, teams had to locate Magaba Tyres and pick up one small tire and one large truck tire. Teams then had to roll them through the market onto the back of a waiting truck parked nearby in order to receive their next clue.
- After the Detour, teams had to travel to the Harare Gardens in order to find their next clue. There, teams had to choose a vocal coach, who taught them the pronunciation of the Shona lyrics to the Four Brothers song "Pasi Pano Pane Zviedzo". They then had to perform the song on stage accompanied by a band with correct pronunciation and rhythm while dancing to the beat in order to receive their next clue, which directed them to the Pit Stop: the First Street Pedestrian Mall.

Additional notes

- This leg featured a Double U-Turn. Lucas & Brittany chose to use the U-Turn on Cody & Jessica, while Alex & Conor chose to use the U-Turn on Henry & Evan.
- Legs 7 and 8 aired back-to-back as a special two-hour episode.

=== Leg 9 (Zimbabwe → Bahrain) ===
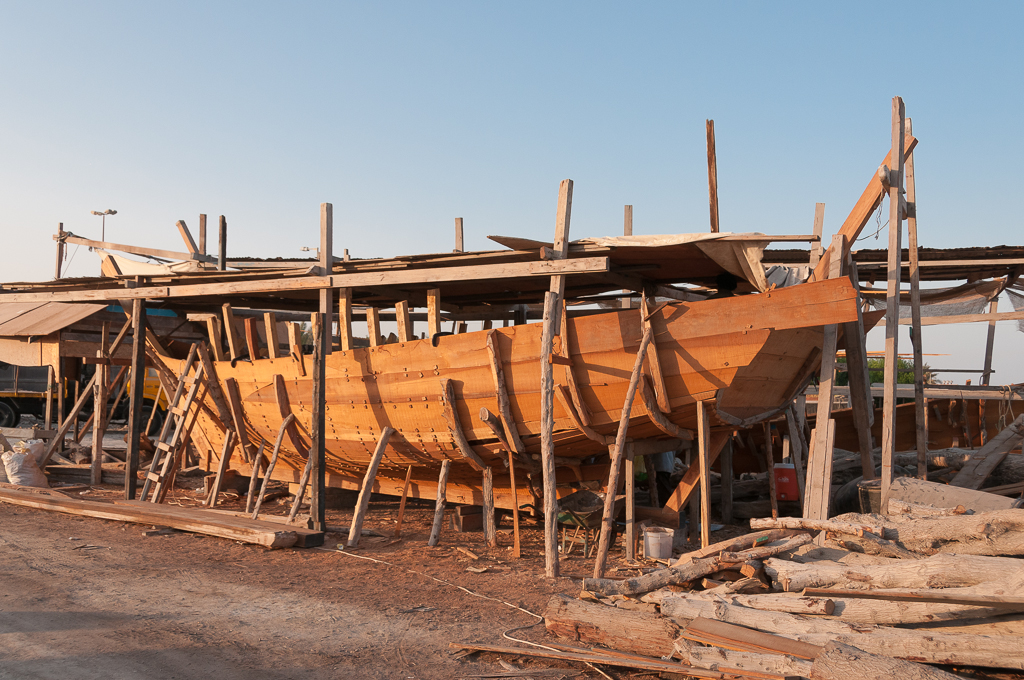
After arriving in Muharraq, teams participated in traditional Bahraini boat-making by weighing the right amount of wood to make a dhow.

- Episode 7: "The First Rule of Amazing Race Club" (February 14, 2018)
- Prize: US$7,500 each (awarded to Alex & Conor)
- Eliminated: Lucas & Brittany

Locations

- Harare (Africa Unity Square)
- Harare (Phileas Fogg Travel)
- Harare → Manama, Bahrain
- Muharraq (Dhow Shipyard)
- Manama (Bahrain Bay) (Unaired)
- Muharraq (Hussein Mohammad Showaiter Sweets)
- A'ali (Delmon Pottery Industry)
- Zallaq (Bahrain Endurance Village)
- Sakhir (Tree of Life)

Episode summary

- At the start of this leg, teams were instructed to fly to Manama, Bahrain, with teams required to book their flight at Phileas Fogg Travel. Once there, teams had to drive to the dhow shipyard, where they had to carry and place a total of 300 pounds (140 kg) of timber onto a balance scale in order to receive their next clue.
- At Hussein Mohammad Showaiter Sweets, teams asked for the "King of Halwa", a local dessert that each team member had to sample in order to receive their next clue, which directed them to Delmon Pottery Industry. There, teams chose a pouch containing ten small objects. They then had to search inside hundreds of clay pots around the shop for the matching items and bring the pots back to the starting point, one at a time, to be verified. Once all of the matching items were collected, teams received a pot to break open which contained their next clue.
- Teams had to drive to the Bahrain Endurance Village and choose a camel herder, who showed them how to milk a camel. One team member had to collect enough milk to fill a glass while their partner kept the camel calm in order to receive their next clue, which directed them to the Pit Stop: the Tree of Life.

Additional notes

- In an unaired task at Bahrain Bay, team members were asked three questions and, without consulting each other, had to answer to whom each question applied. Team members had to answer these questions with one member standing on a plank of a boat floating on the sea. If the answer did not match, then the person on the plank had to dive into the bay and teams had to start over. When teams matched all three answers, they received their next clue.
- Lucas discovered that he had lost his passport while on a connecting flight from Zimbabwe to Bahrain. As a result, Lucas & Brittany did not arrive in Bahrain until long after the other teams had already checked in at the Pit Stop. Phil met them at the shipyard to inform them of their elimination.

=== Leg 10 (Bahrain → Thailand) ===
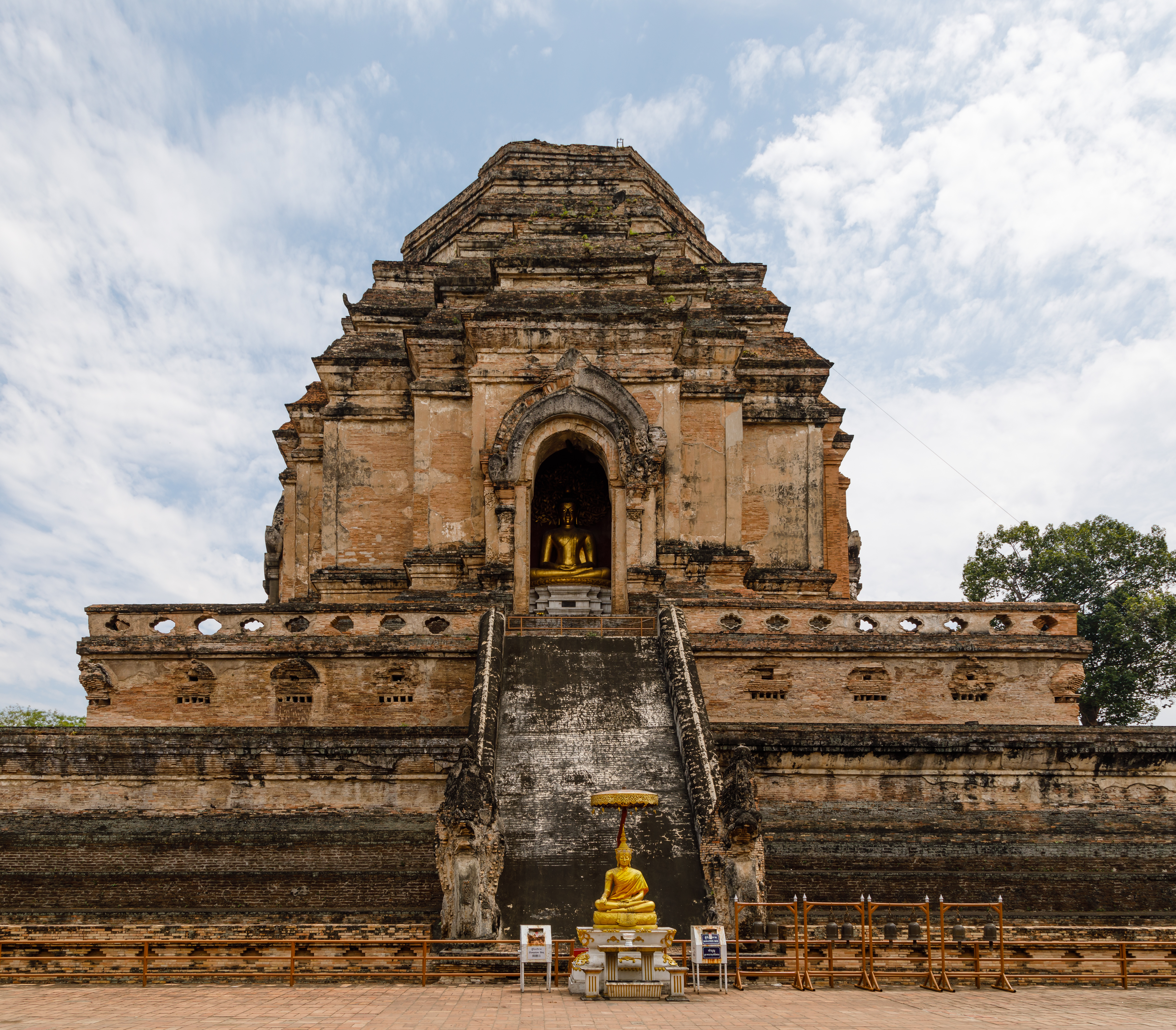
The iconic Wat Chedi Luang, a Buddhist temple in downtown Chiang Mai, served as the Pit Stop for this leg.

- Episode 7: "The First Rule of Amazing Race Club" (February 14, 2018)
- Prize: A trip for two to Curaçao (awarded to Alex & Conor)

Locations

- Muharraq (Arad Walkway – Falcon Statue)
- Manama → Chiang Mai, Thailand
- Mae Hia (Royal Park Ratchaphruek)
- Ban Pong (Patara Elephant Farm or Baan Kaew Rice Field)
- Chiang Mai (Original Khum Khantoke Restaurant)
- Chiang Mai (Wat Chedi Luang)

Episode summary

- At the start of this leg, teams were instructed to fly to Chiang Mai, Thailand. Once there, teams were directed to find the white elephants at Royal Park Ratchaphruek, where they found a garland that they had to give to one of four women with an umbrella in the vicinity of the garden in exchange for their next clue.
- This leg's Detour was a choice between Size It or Seize It. In Size It, teams had to travel to Patara Elephant Farm, where they had to calculate the height and weight of an adult elephant. If the veterinarian deemed their measurements to be correct, teams could ride their elephant along a trail and feed it before receiving their next clue. In Seize It, teams had to catch twenty bullfrogs in a flooded rice paddy in order to receive their next clue.
- After the Detour, teams had to travel to the Original Khum Khantoke Restaurant in order to find their next clue.
- In this leg's Roadblock, one team member had to consume three cooked scorpions and a bullfrog while scorpions were crawling on their partner in order to receive their next clue, which directed them to the Pit Stop: Wat Chedi Luang.

Additional notes

- This was a non-elimination leg.
- Legs 9 and 10 aired back-to-back as a special two-hour episode.

=== Leg 11 (Thailand → Hong Kong) ===
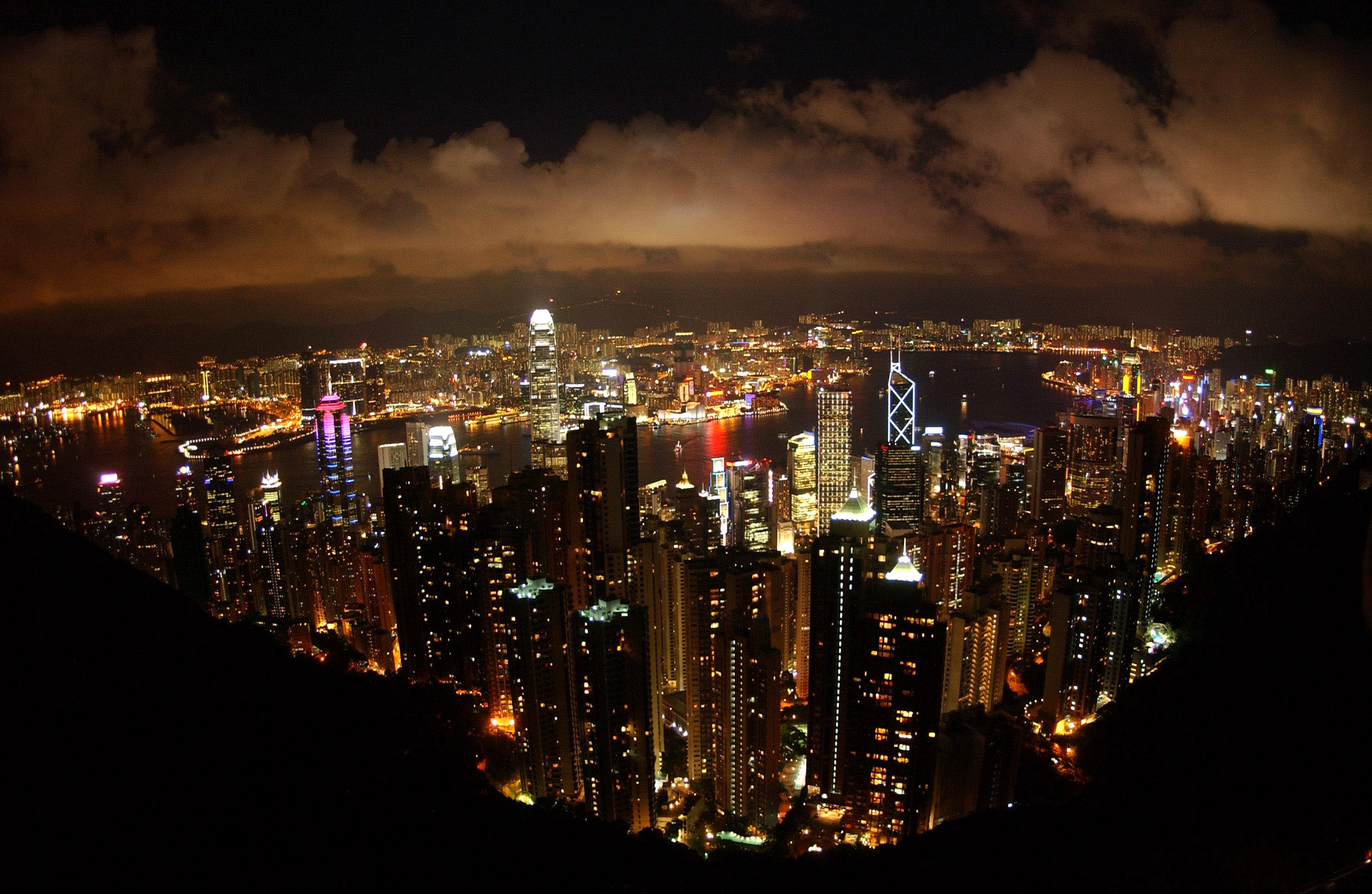
After arriving in Hong Kong, teams visited Lions Pavilion at the top of Victoria Peak, overlooking the skyline of the Central Business District, to get their clue.

- Episode 8: "It's Just a Million Dollars, No Pressure" (February 21, 2018)
- Eliminated: Alex & Conor

Locations

- Chiang Mai (Wat Chedi Luang)
- Chiang Mai → Hong Kong
- Hong Kong (Lions Pavilion)
- Hong Kong (Aberdeen Promenade)
- Hong Kong (Aberdeen floating village or Ap Lei Chau Main Street – Jin Bao Seafood Restaurant)
- Hong Kong (Central Pier #4)
- Hong Kong (Lan Kwai Fong)
- Hong Kong (Intersection of Johnston Road & Wan Chai Road)

Episode summary

- At the start of this leg, teams were instructed to fly to Hong Kong. Once there, teams traveled to the Lions Pavilion atop Victoria Peak, where they had their picture taken overlooking the Hong Kong skyline. After their photograph was printed, teams were given the photograph and their next clue, which directed them to the Aberdeen Promenade.
- For their Speed Bump, Henry & Evan had to light and place flameless candles into forty paper lanterns before they could continue racing.
- This season's final Detour was a choice between Hairy Crab or Grub Grab. In Hairy Crab, teams had to properly wrap and pack fifty live hairy crabs in a basket, while subjected to simulated typhoon conditions, in order to receive their next clue. In Grub Grab, one team member had to take eight restaurant orders in Cantonese, and then relay them to their partner in the kitchen, who had to find the corresponding dishes, which were labeled phonetically. Once every patron was served correctly, teams received their next clue.
- In this leg's Roadblock, one team member had to wear protective equipment and smash a pile of old electronics in order to find the two that each contained half of a clue. Once they found both halves, they then splattered paint over the pile to create a work of "rage art". Meanwhile, the non-participating team member was handcuffed to a briefcase.
- After the Roadblock, teams had to search the streets of Lan Kwai Fong for three signs depicting items seen in previous legs and recall the leg numbers where those things were seen: the Washington Square Arch from leg 1, a fez hat from leg 3, and a bull from leg 5. These numbers formed the combination needed to open the briefcase. Inside the briefcase was the key to the handcuffs and the location of the Pit Stop: the intersection of Johnston Road and Wan Chai Road.

Additional note

- Alex & Conor were still at Lan Kwai Fong long after the other teams had already checked in at the Pit Stop. Phil went to meet them to inform them of their elimination.

=== Leg 12 (Hong Kong → United States) ===
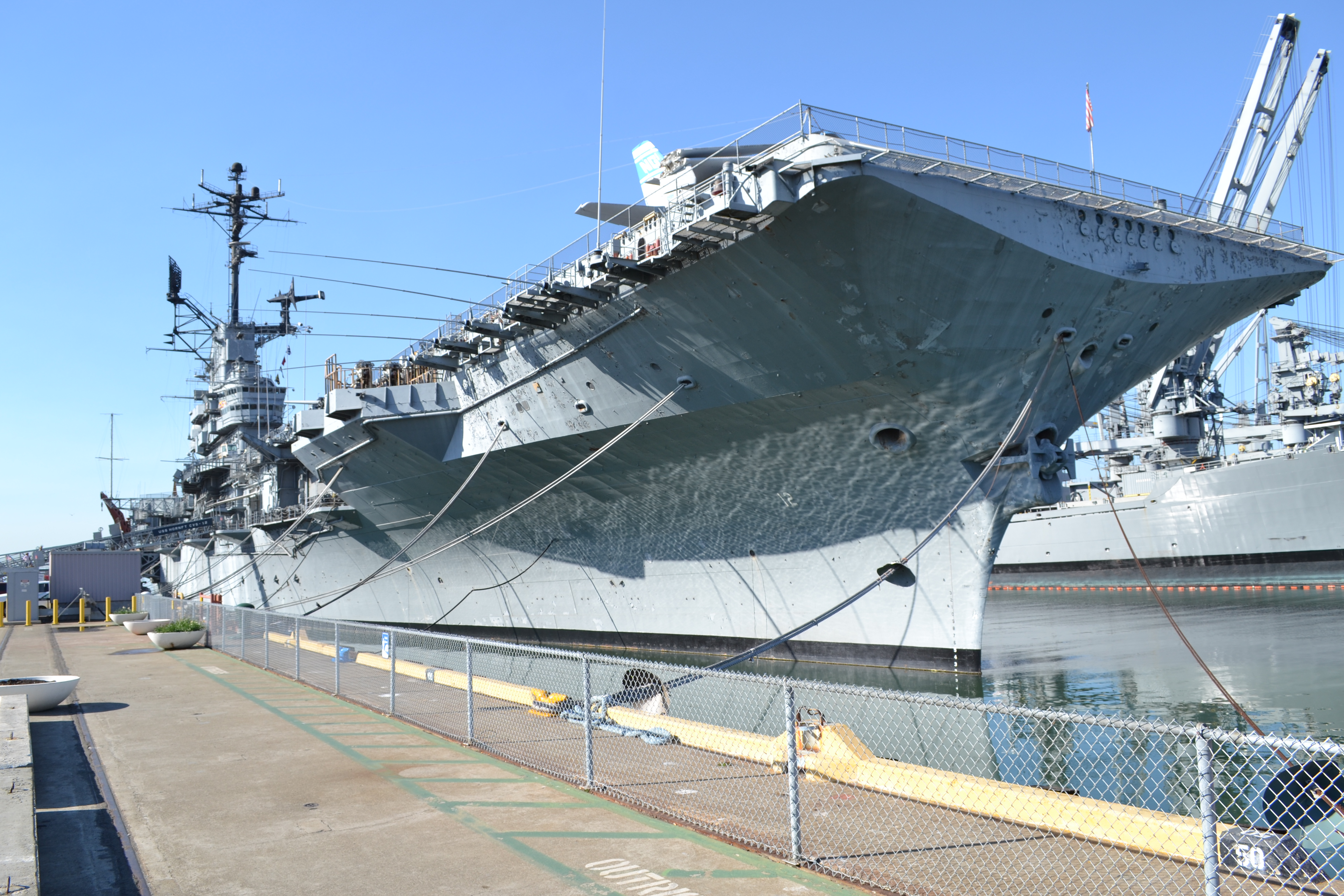
The flight deck of the USS Hornet in Alameda, California served as the finish line of The Amazing Race 30.

- Episode 8: "It's Just a Million Dollars, No Pressure" (February 21, 2018)
- Prize: US$1,000,000
- Winners: Cody & Jessica
- Runners-up: Henry & Evan
- Third place: Kristi & Jen

Locations

- Hong Kong (Intersection of Johnston Road & Wan Chai Road)
- Hong Kong → San Francisco, California
- San Francisco (AT&T Park – "Say Hey Kid" Statue)
- San Francisco (McCovey Cove)
- San Francisco (San Francisco–Oakland Bay Bridge)
- San Francisco (Golden Gate Fortune Cookie Company)
- San Francisco (San Francisco City Hall) (Unaired)
- Alameda (USS Hornet)

Episode summary

- At the end of the previous leg, Phil informed teams that they were flying to San Francisco, California. Once there, teams had to find their next clue near the "Say Hey Kid" Statue, and teams had to figure out that this was the statue of Willie Mays outside AT&T Park. Teams had to paddle kayaks into McCovey Cove and find three numbered baseballs corresponding to the number of career home runs hit by Willie Mays, while San Francisco Giants mascot Lou Seal threw more balls into the water from the ballpark. Once teams found two 6s and a 0, they received their next clue.
- In this season's final Roadblock, one team member had to use jumars to pull themselves up 200 feet (61 m) to the top of the San Francisco–Oakland Bay Bridge center anchorage. They then had to enter the structure and put on a harness before free falling into the anchorage in order to receive their next clue.
- The clue received from the Roadblock was a rebus, and once solved, teams had to travel to the Golden Gate Fortune Cookie Company. There, they had to properly make 102 fortune cookies, after which they received a giant fortune cookie which contained their next clue.
- On the USS Hornet, teams had to choose a fuselage of a large model airplane on the flight deck, and then search the aircraft carrier for twelve parts of matching color (two propellers, four wings, four horizontal stabilizers, and two vertical stabilizers) to complete the model. Each part had different pictures depicting objects that teams had encountered during the race. After finding all twelve parts, the team member who did not perform the Roadblock had to assemble the airplane with the correct combination of six parts (one propeller, two wings, two horizontal stabilizers, and one vertical stabilizer) that fit correctly on the fuselage and represented all twelve legs without duplication. Once approved, the team member had to push the airplane to their partner and the team could proceed to the finish line at the opposite end of the flight deck.

| Leg | Country | Object |
|---|---|---|
| 1 | Iceland | Off-road helmet |
| 2 | Belgium | French fry |
| 3 | Morocco | Fish |
| 4 | France | Rudder |
| 5 | France | Knight |
| 6 | Czech Republic | Magnifying glass |
| 7 | Zimbabwe | Canteen |
| 8 | Zimbabwe | Microphone |
| 9 | Bahrain | Scale |
| 10 | Thailand | Elephant |
| 11 | Hong Kong | Handcuff |
| 12 | United States | Oar |

Additional notes

- After the fortune cookie task, teams were instructed to travel to San Francisco City Hall in order to receive their next clue, which directed them to the USS Hornet. This segment was unaired.
- Legs 11 and 12 aired back-to-back as a special two-hour episode.

== Production ==
=== Development and filming ===
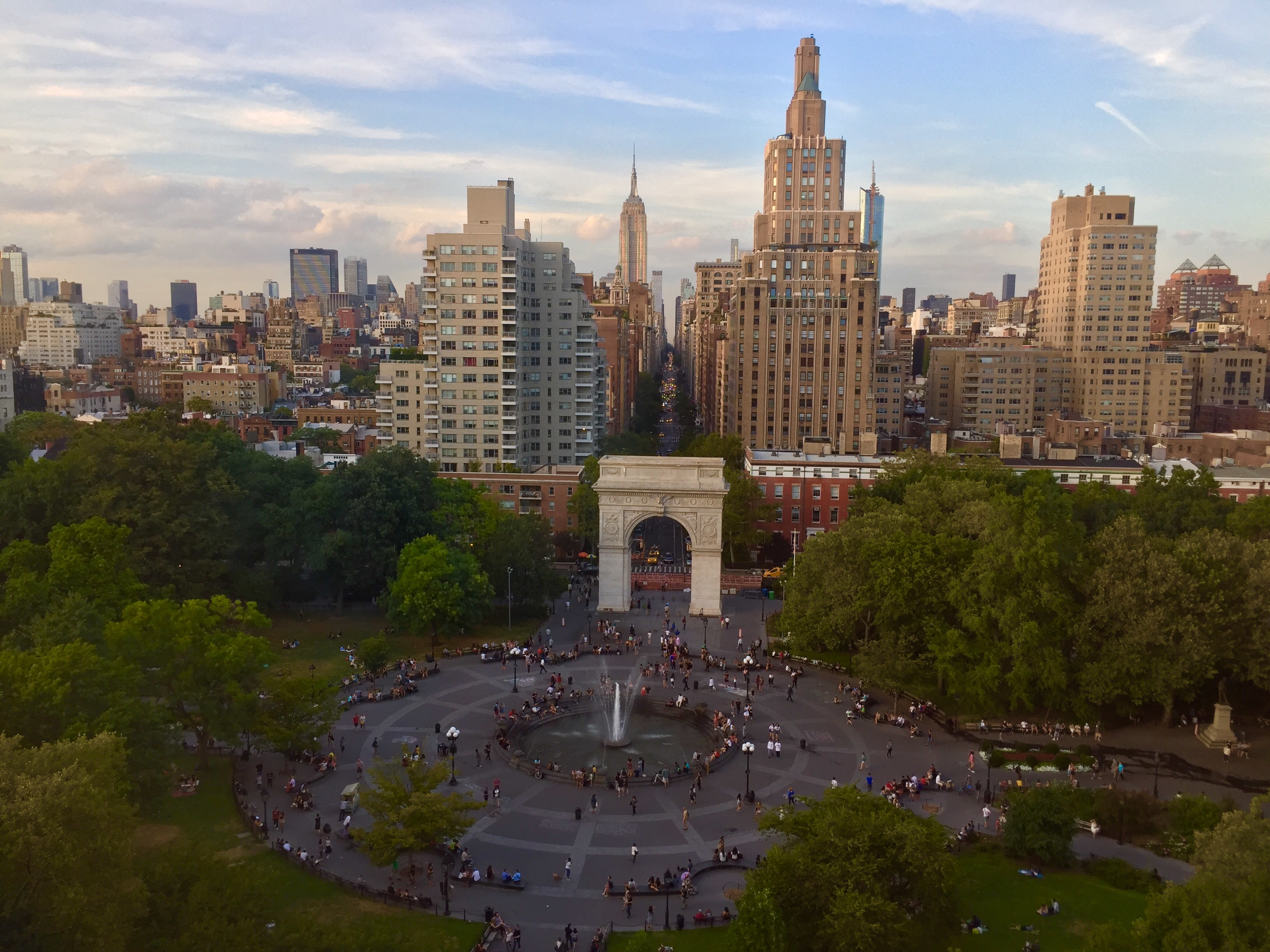
The 30th season of The Amazing Race started filming on October 1, 2017, at Washington Square Park in New York City.

As happened before in the twenty-fifth and twenty-seventh seasons, the show's official website announced that they would begin filming on October 1, 2017, at Washington Square Park in New York City, and invited fans to join them as they saw the new teams off. Teams left New York City and were in Iceland by the next day. On October 4, the show filmed in Antwerp, Belgium, with footage released online of racers competing in a "Frietrace" at Grote Markt. On October 8, photographs were posted to social media of teams playing pétanque at the Place des Lices in Saint-Tropez, France. On October 16, six teams were reported to be racing in Harare, Zimbabwe, with one task involving them singing at the Harare Gardens. Filming ended on October 24, 2017, in San Francisco.

This season introduced Head-to-Head competitions, where two teams had to compete directly against one another. Additionally, for the first time, teams swapped partners with another team and ran most of one leg with their swapped partners instead. This season was the first time The Amazing Race visited Bahrain.

=== Casting ===
Host Phil Keoghan said that the casting focus for this season was to pick the most competitive lineup of teams in Amazing Race history.

== Reception ==
=== Critical response ===
The Amazing Race 30 received mostly positive reviews. Andy Dehnart of reality blurred called it "a decent season of the race". Jodi Walker of Entertainment Weekly was positive towards the teams and competitiveness of this season calling it "a truly great season". Ken Tucker of Yahoo was critical of this season doubling up episodes and the cliquishness of this season towards the later episodes. In 2023, Rhenn Taguiam of Game Rant ranked this season as the thirteenth-best season. In 2024, Taguiam's ranking was updated with this season ranked 16th out of 36.

=== Ratings ===
Viewership and ratings per episode of The Amazing Race 30
| No. | Title | Air date | Rating/share (18–49) | Viewers (millions) | DVR (18–49) | DVR viewers (millions) | Total (18–49) | Total viewers (millions) | Ref. |
|---|---|---|---|---|---|---|---|---|---|
| 1 | "You're a Champion, Prove It" | January 3, 2018 | 1.6/6 | 7.33 | 0.4 | 1.47 | 2.0 | 8.80 | |
| 2 | "You're the Best French Fry Ever" | January 10, 2018 | 1.4/5 | 6.98 | 0.5 | —N/a | 1.9 | —N/a | |
| 3 | "It's Gonna Be a Fragrant Day" | January 17, 2018 | 1.5/6 | 6.89 | 0.4 | 1.41 | 1.9 | 8.30 | |
| 4–5 | "Gotta Put Your Sole into it" | January 24, 2018 | 1.2/5 | 6.17 | 0.4 | 1.40 | 1.6 | 7.57 | |
| 6 | "The Claws Are Out" | January 31, 2018 | 1.3/5 | 6.54 | 0.4 | 1.40 | 1.7 | 7.98 | |
| 7–8 | "All's Fair in Love and War" | February 7, 2018 | 1.1/4 | 5.07 | 0.6 | 2.18 | 1.7 | 7.25 | |
| 9–10 | "The First Rule of Amazing Race Club" | February 14, 2018 | 0.9/3 | 4.12 | 0.5 | 1.85 | 1.4 | 5.96 | |
| 11–12 | "It's Just a Million Dollars, No Pressure" | February 21, 2018 | 0.9/3 | 4.34 | 0.4 | 1.68 | 1.3 | 6.02 | |

- Episodes 9 & 10, "The First Rule of Amazing Race Club", aired during the opening week of the 2018 Winter Olympics.

== Works cited ==
- Castro, Adam-Troy (2006). My Ox Is Broken!. BenBella Books. ISBN 978-1-932100-91-4.
