= Place des Lices (Saint-Tropez) =

Public square in Saint-Tropez

- City square
- {{{other_names}}}
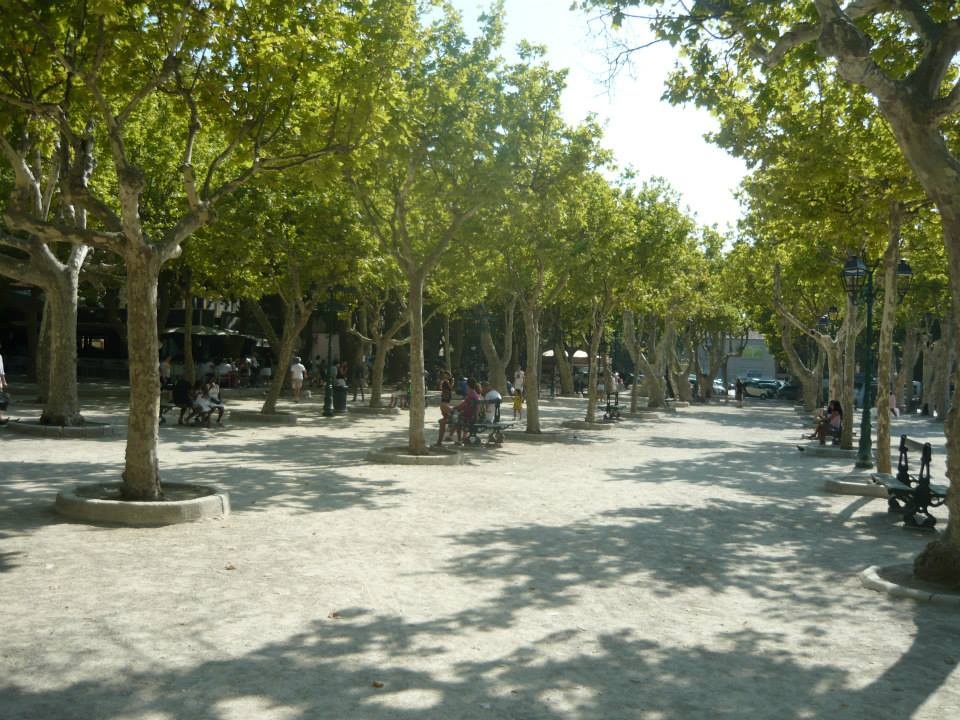
- Place des Lices
- Location: Saint-Tropez, France
- Interactive map of Place des Lices
- Coordinates: 43°16′12″N 6°38′28.1″E

Place des Lices also known as Place Carnot is a nineteenth century public square in the city of Saint-Tropez, France.

== Location ==
Place des Lices is located south of the Saint-Tropez's Vieux Port at the convergence of Avenue Foch and Boulevard Vasserot.

== History ==
The area of Place des Lices dates back to the ninth and tenth century when the field was likely used as a jousting ground as the original meaning of Lices was "jousting ground". By the early 1800s, the field was converted into a city square when twelve plane trees were planted. Between 1890 and 1940, Places des Lices became a popular gathering space for French artists particularly at the square's Café des Arts.

== Description ==
Place des Lices is lined with rows of hundred year old plane trees on the square's white sandy ground. The edges of the square is lined with rows of cafés. The square also houses an eighteen century fountain.

== Activities ==
Each Tuesday and Saturday, Place des Lices hosts a Provençal market. Locals at Place des Lices often play the boules game pétanque. The square also hosts pétanque tournaments during summer.

== Cultural depictions ==
=== Art ===
Several artists including Paul Signac, Joseph Kutter, Henri Matisse, and Charles Camoin have painted works depicting Places des Lices.

=== Television ===
Place des Lices appeared on the fourth episode of The Amazing Race 30 (2018) as the site of a Head-to-Head competition of pétanque and the leg's Pit Stop.

== Gallery ==
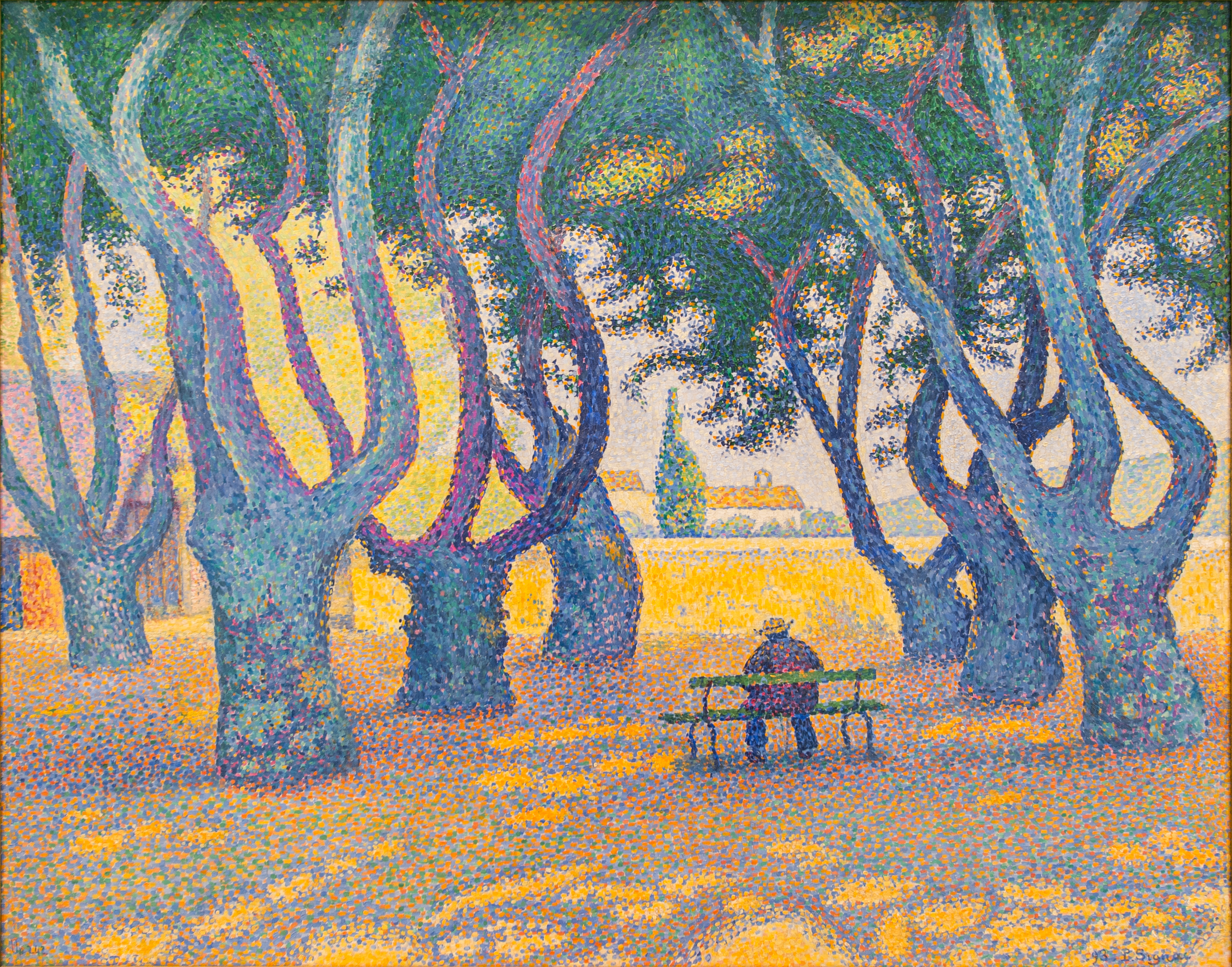
Place des Lices, St. Tropez by Paul Signac, 1893

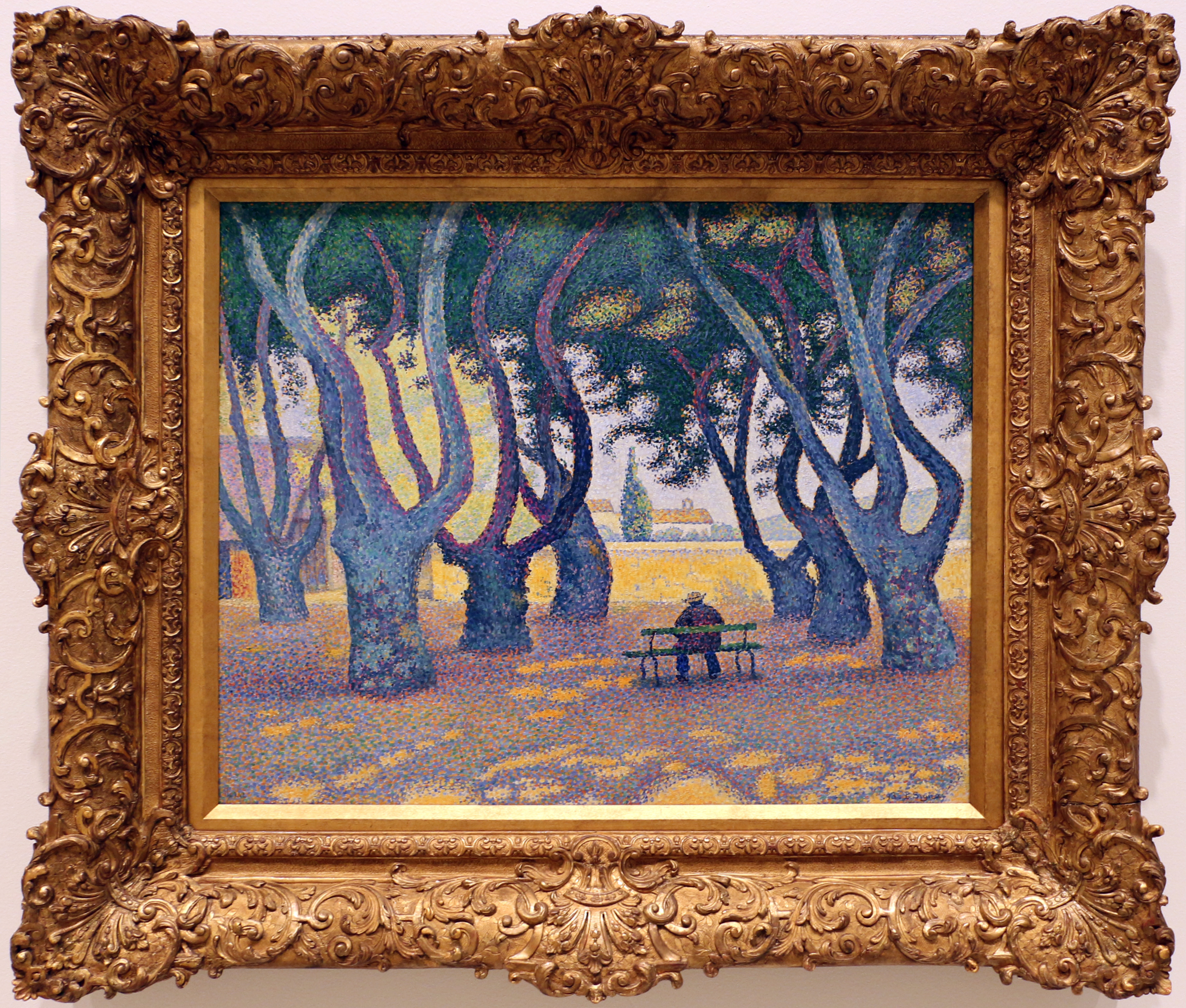
Place des Lices, St. Tropez at the Carnegie Museum of Art

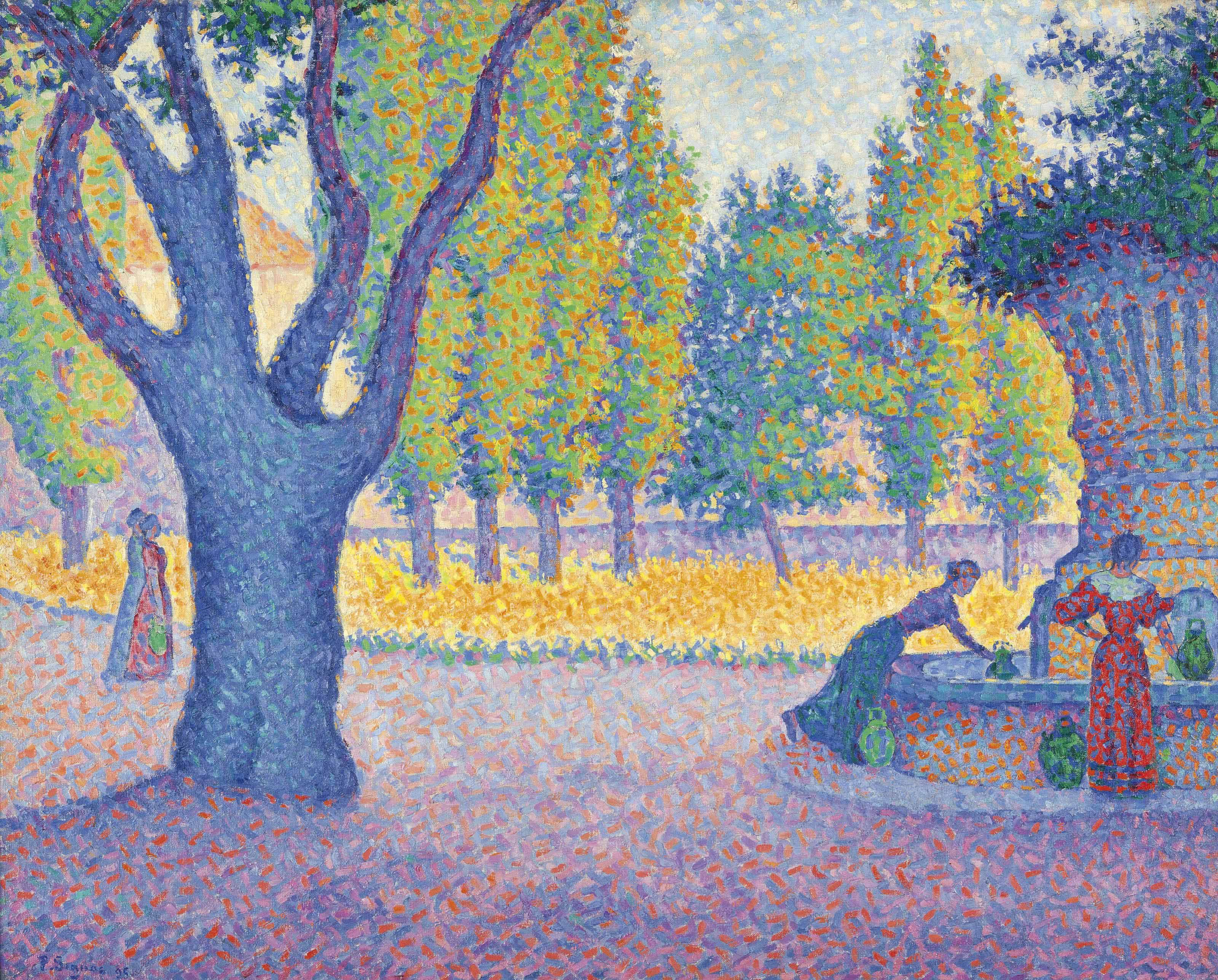
Saint-Tropez, Fontaine des Lices by Paul Signac, 1895

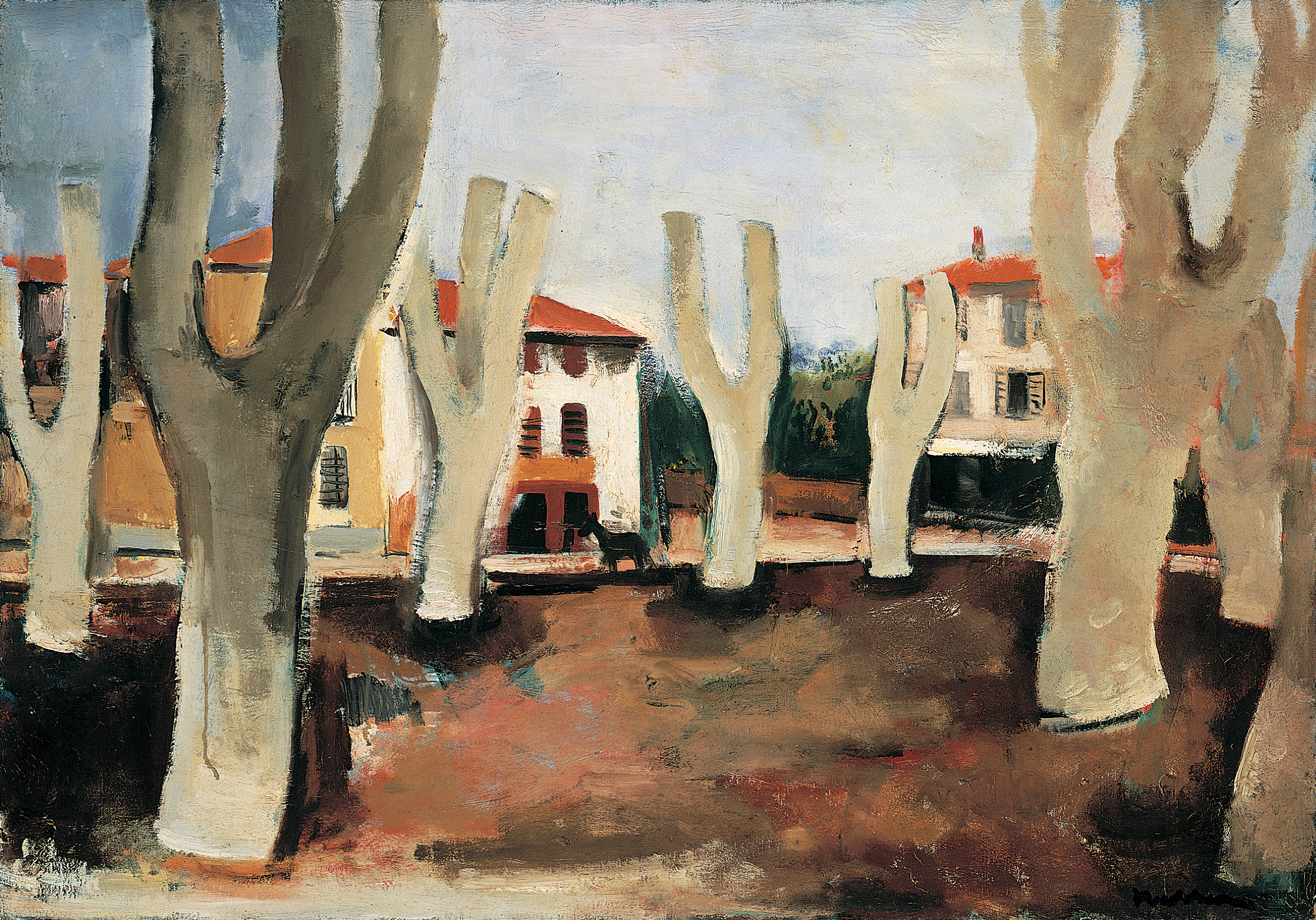
Saint-Tropez, Place des Lices by Joseph Kutter, 1930

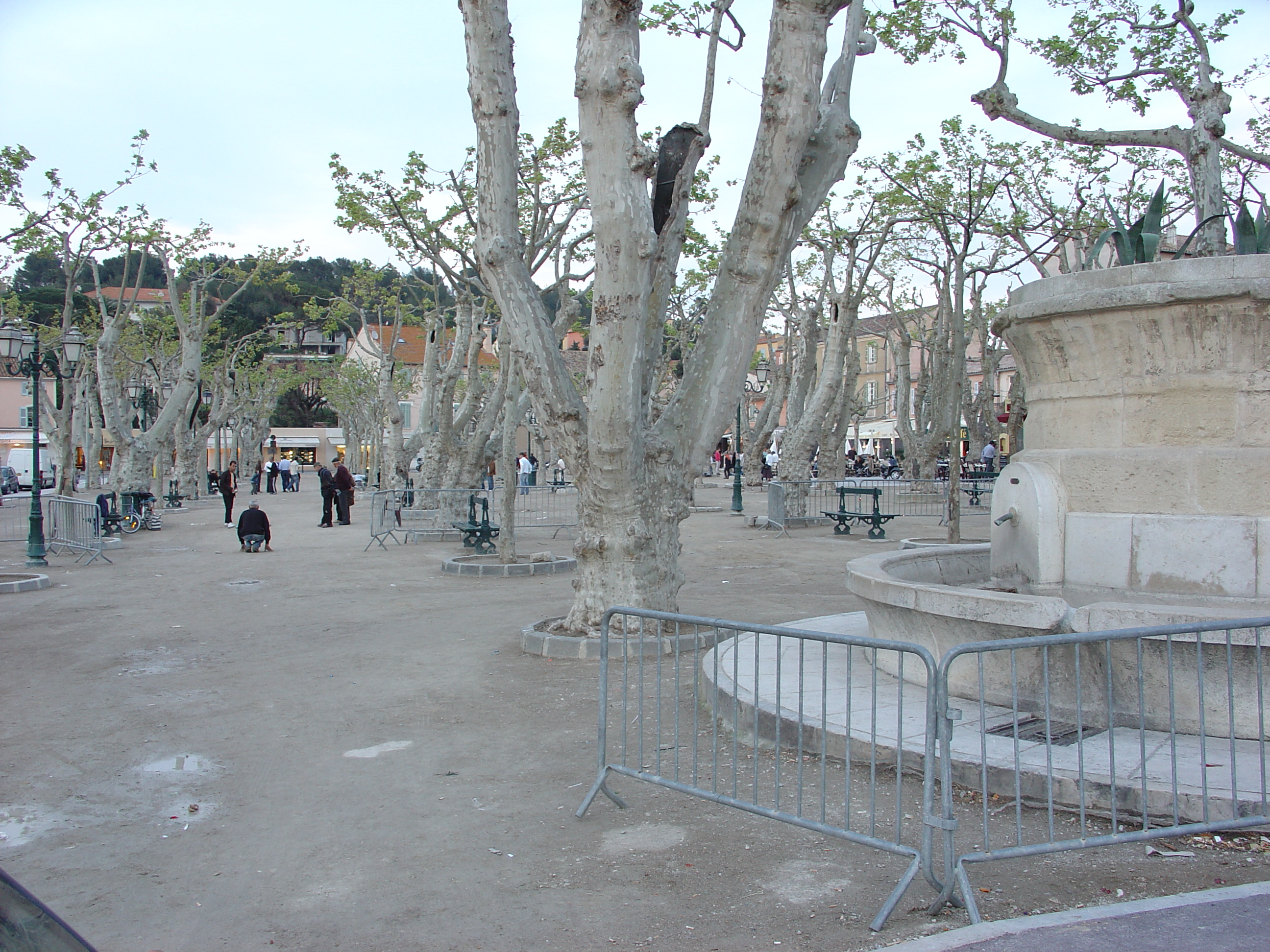
Place des Lices Fountain

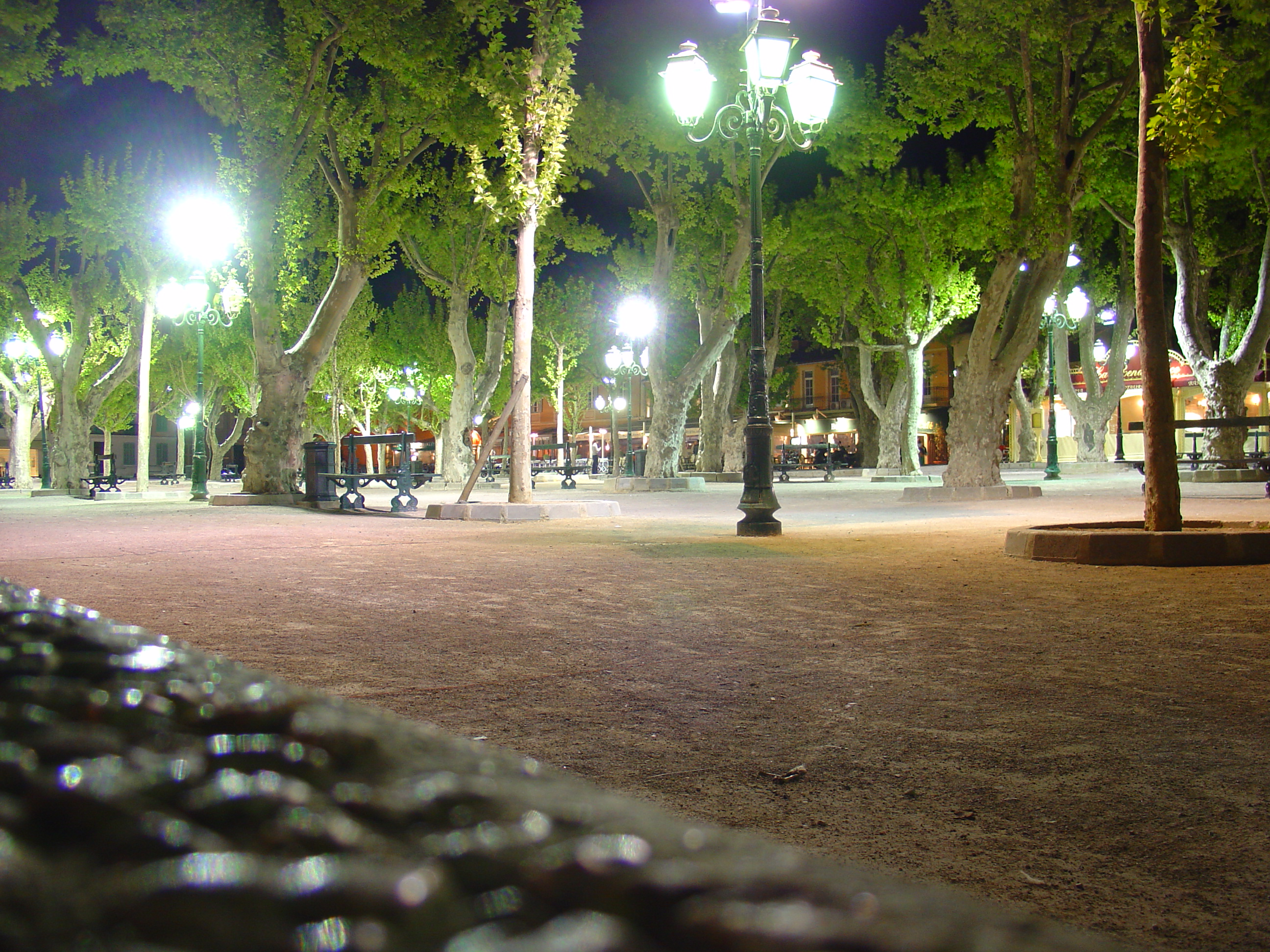
Place des Lices at Night

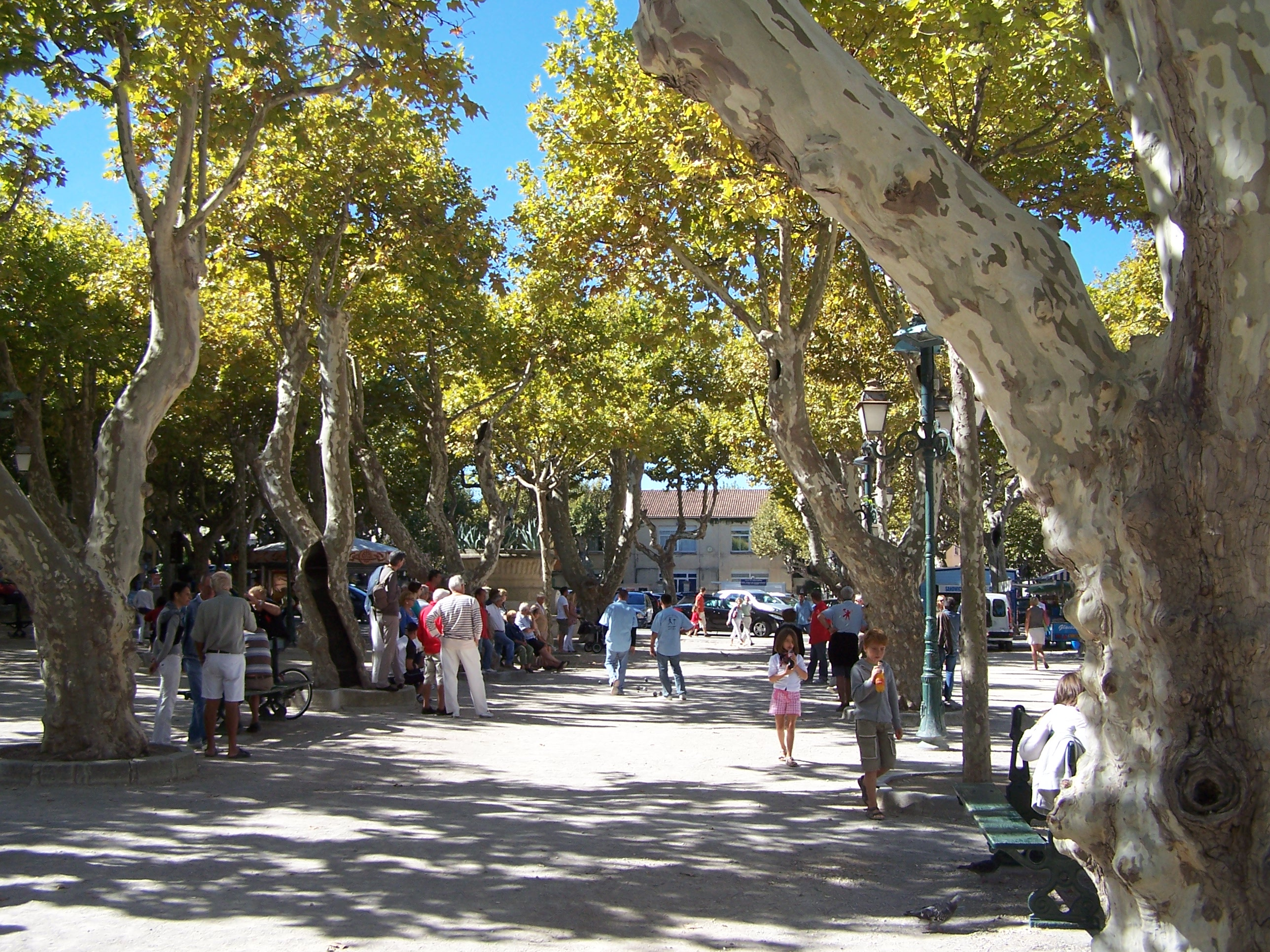
Boules Players in Place des Lices
