= Kristi Leskinen =

American freestyle skier

Personal information
- Born: February 10, 1981 (age 45) Hopwood, Pennsylvania, U.S.
- Height: 5 ft 8 in (1.73 m)
- Website: www.kristileskinen.com

Sport
- Country: United States
- Sport: Freestyle Skiing
Medal record
FIS Freestyle World Ski Championships
Silver medal – second place	2005 Ruka	Halfpipe
X Games
Bronze medal – third place	2005 Aspen	Superpipe
- Updated on August 1, 2013

Kristi Leskinen (born February 10, 1981) is an American freestyle skier. At Winter X Games IX, she won a bronze medal in the Women's Superpipe.

Leskinen was the first woman to pull off a rodeo 720: two rotations with her head pointed towards the earth. Leskinen was named one of the Twenty Greatest Adventure Sport Athletes of today by Faces Magazine in 2005. She appeared on the cover of Powder magazine's Photo Annual in 2004.

== Early life ==
Leskinen was born on February 10, 1981, and grew up in Uniontown, Pennsylvania, near Seven Springs Mountain Resort and Hidden Valley Resort. She learned to pole vault two weeks before Regionals during her senior year of high school; Leskinen set a school record while qualifying for the State Championships. She was also the Western Pennsylvania breaststroke champion.

Leskinen's favorite sports growing up were skiing and wakeboarding. She won the first mogul contest she entered and she was being groomed to compete in the Olympics as a teenager. Moguls did not offer the freedom Leskinen craved, so she switched to wakeboarding. Leskinen took second in the US Wakeboard Nationals and fourth at the World Championship. In 2000, while attending the US Open, she spotted some pros having a practice session on a rail and decided to learn freestyle skiing.

== Professional career ==
In her first US Open, Leskinen was the only woman doing the Big Air event and one of the handful of women participating on the Superpipe. By 2004, the sport had grown and the US Open had 40 athletes participating in the Superpipe, the largest of its kind in the world. She took second place.

Leskinen realized that videos reach a bigger audience than a single contest. She started filming all over the world. In 2005, Leskinen took bronze at the Winter X Games as well as a silver at the World Championship in the Halfpipe. That same year, she placed first at the Gravity Games Halfpipe. Since that season, Leskinen has had many notable performances such as second place in the North American Open in 2008, third place in the European Open in 2008, and second in the Aspen Open in 2009.

=== Career highlights ===
- 2009 3rd place, Homecoming
- 2009 5th place, Dew Tour Slopestyle- Mt Snow, VT
- 2009 2nd place, Aspen Open Slopestyle
- 2008 3rd place, European Open Slopestyle- Laax, Switzerland
- 2008 2nd place, North American Open
- 2007 2nd place, Nippon Freeski Open
- 2005 3rd place, Winter X Games Halfpipe
- 2005 2nd place, US Open Halfpipe
- 2005 1st place, Gravity Games Halfpipe
- 2004 2nd place, US Freeskiing Open Superpipe- Vail, CO

== Modeling and television career ==
With her classic high cheekbones and blonde tresses, Leskinen became a pin-up girl in sponsor posters. She was named of the "100 Hottest Women of 2005" by FHM.

In early 2009, Leskinen appeared on the show The Superstars on ABC, which pitted pairs of athletes and celebrities in a series of athletic events. She and her partner, dancer Maksim Chmerkovskiy from Dancing with the Stars, won.

Leskinen appeared on the 30th season of The Amazing Race with teammate Jen Hudak; they finished in third place.

== Personal life ==
Leskinen resides in Mammoth Lakes, California.
