= Well-Strung =

American string quartet

- Genre: classical music fused with contemporary pop songs
- Years active: 2012–present
- Members: Edmund Bagnell, Christopher Marchant, Daniel Shevlin, and Trevor Wadleigh
- Website: well-strung.com

Well-Strung is an American string quartet based in New York City that is known for fusing classical music with modern pop music. The band was formed in 2012 by band member Chris Marchant and producer Mark Cortale. The band consists of four members, who all identify as gay: first violinist Edmund Bagnell, second violinist Christopher Marchant, cellist Daniel Shevlin, and violist Trevor Wadleigh. The band has performed arrangements of hits by artists including Adele, Britney Spears, Ke$ha, Lady Gaga, P!nk, and Rihanna, arranged with classical songs by composers like Bach, Dvořák, Mozart, and Vivaldi. They have also performed covers of songs from films. The band performs their own arrangements.

== History ==
The concept for the band originated in 2010 when Marchant and Cortale met in Provincetown. They held auditions in New York City to round out the quartet and debuted at Joe's Pub in New York City in the spring of 2012. In their first year, they performed over 100 shows. The band has toured internationally, including at the Vatican. They played at a gala for Barack Obama. They also played for Hillary Clinton, for whom they had written "Chelsea's Mom", a playful reimagining of the 2003 Fountains of Wayne hit song "Stacy's Mom" that had gone viral. They have performed with celebrities including Kristin Chenoweth, Neil Patrick Harris, Audra McDonald, and Deborah Voigt.

The band has appeared on The Today Show three times and with Andy Cohen on Watch What Happens Live. Shows have been directed by Donna Drake and Richard Jay-Alexander.

Two of the band's members, Marchant and Wadleigh, competed in The Amazing Race 30 in 2018.

The band also has played multiple times at Ravinia Festival north of Chicago, most recently in 2019.

== Style ==
The group often crafts its own arrangements that combine the two styles of music, such as the group's cover of Taylor Swift's Blank Space layered with excerpts from Bach's Partita No. 3, or the mash-up of Lorde's Royals with composer Karl Jenkins's Palladio.

During live shows, the group often shares personal anecdotes with the audience between songs, resulting in part-cabaret, part-concert performance.

== Albums and appearances ==
The group regularly plays in cities across America and has toured internationally, playing approximately 120 shows a year. Since its formation, Well-Strung has held regular summer residences in Provincetown, Massachusetts, where the group was started.

Well-Strung has recorded three albums: Well-Strung (2013), POPssical (2015), and Under the Covers (2018). POPssical debuted at #8 on Billboard's Classical Crossover Chart. They have also released two singles: a mash-up of Green Day's "21 Guns" and Pachelbel's Canon, and an arrangement of "Silent Night".
