= Jen Hudak =

American freestyle skier

Medal record

Women's Freestyle skiing

Representing the United States

FIS Freestyle World Ski Championships
Silver medal – second place	2011 Deer Valley	Halfpipe
Bronze medal – third place	2009 Inawashiro	Halfpipe

Winter X Games
Gold medal – first place	2010 Aspen	Superpipe
Silver medal – second place	2009 Aspen	Superpipe
Bronze medal – third place	2007 Aspen	Superpipe
Bronze medal – third place	2008 Aspen	Superpipe

New Zealand Winter Games
Silver medal – second place	2011 Cardrona	Halfpipe
Silver medal – second place	2011 Cardrona	Big Air

Jennifer Hudak (born September 7, 1986) is an American freestyle skier, specializing in the halfpipe event. Her professional skiing career began in 2004, when she won the US Free Skiing Open. In 2005 and 2006, Hudak won the Junior National and U.S. National Halfpipe Championship, respectively. She tore her ACL in 2012. Hudak graduated in 2017 from the University of Utah with her bachelor's degree in psychology. She is the daughter of computer scientist Paul Hudak.

== Television ==
Hudak appeared on the 30th season of The Amazing Race with teammate Kristi Leskinen where they finished in third place.
