= Chris Marchant =

Co-founder of string quartet Well-Strung

- Born: December 23, 1983 (age 42); Canton, Ohio
- Occupations: Violinist / Singer; Co-Creator and Member of Well-Strung

Christopher Marchant is the co-creator and founding member of the all-male singing string quartet Well-Strung. He was also a contestant on the 30th Season of The Amazing Race along with his Well-Strung bandmate Trevor Wadleigh.

== Background ==
Marchant was born and raised in Canton, Ohio. He began singing and playing the violin at the age of nine and graduated from Malone College with a degree in music ministry.

He moved to New York City in 2010 to pursue a career in musical theater. He has performed in national touring musicals including "Sweeney Todd" and "Spring Awakening" and was a performer in the long-running off-Broadway musical production Naked Boys Singing! during the revue's 2010 summer residence in Provincetown, Massachusetts.

== Well-Strung ==
Marchant is the co-creator and founding member of Well-Strung, an all-male singing string quartet. All four members are openly gay. They include Marchant (second violin), Edmund Bagnell (first violin), Trevor Wadleigh (viola), and Daniel Shevlin (cello).

== The Amazing Race ==
Marchant was a participant on the 30th Season of The Amazing Race, which premiered on January 3, 2018, on CBS.

Marchant’s partner was fellow Well-Strung bandmate Trevor Wadleigh. Together, they formed “#TeamWellStrung” on the show.

The pair was eliminated on the sixth leg of the race. They placed fourth in each of the first three legs of the race, followed by fifth in Leg 4, seventh (second-to-last) in Leg 5, before being eliminated in the sixth leg. The team was eliminated as a result of a “U-Turn” obstacle imposed on them by a competing team.

The pair was the fifth team to be eliminated, placing them seventh overall out of 11 teams in the competition.
