= Patara Elephant Farm =

Coordinates: 18.808168°N 98.825327°E

- Interactive map of Patara Elephant Farm
- Date opened: 2001
- Location: Hang Dong Valley, Chiang Mai, Thailand
- No. of animals: 67
- Owner: Theerapat "Pat" Trungprakan

Patara Elephant Farm is an elephant breeding farm located near Chiang Mai, Thailand. Their Program "Elephant owner for a day" helps people learn how to take care of an Elephant, and at the end of day, people can enjoy a ride at the back of Elephant.

== Background ==
Patara Elephant Farm is a rehabilitation center for elephants. Its stated focus is on educating the public about elephants and their threats.

The farm pairs visitors with an elephant for a day and the visitors are tasked with caring for that elephant. As of December 2014, the farm is home to 55 elephants. It is located in the mountains near Hang Dong Valley, south of Chiang Mai, Thailand. The farm was founded in 2001 by a man named Theerapat "Pat" Trungprakan.

Theerapat jokingly says that he and the other caretakers spend more time with the elephants than with their wives. The elephant's caretakers, known as mahouts, are from a nearby Karen village and are paired with their own elephants to take care of.

=== Mission statement ===
Patara's conservation philosophy is "Extinction is Forever." Their solution to conservation is through breeding. The farm has four 'points': rescue, recovery, reproduction and reintroduction.

One example of rescuing is Noi/Nui, who was saved from a circus. Patara also adopts elephants from the streets of Bangkok that are used by their mahouts, some of which were used in the illegal logging industry. For reproduction, Patara focuses on actual mating instead of artificial insemination. They have bred 24 elephants in 10 years. Every year, around 2–3 baby elephants are born. Five baby elephants were born in 2013. The first baby elephant born at the farm was a male named Puchan.

== Program ==
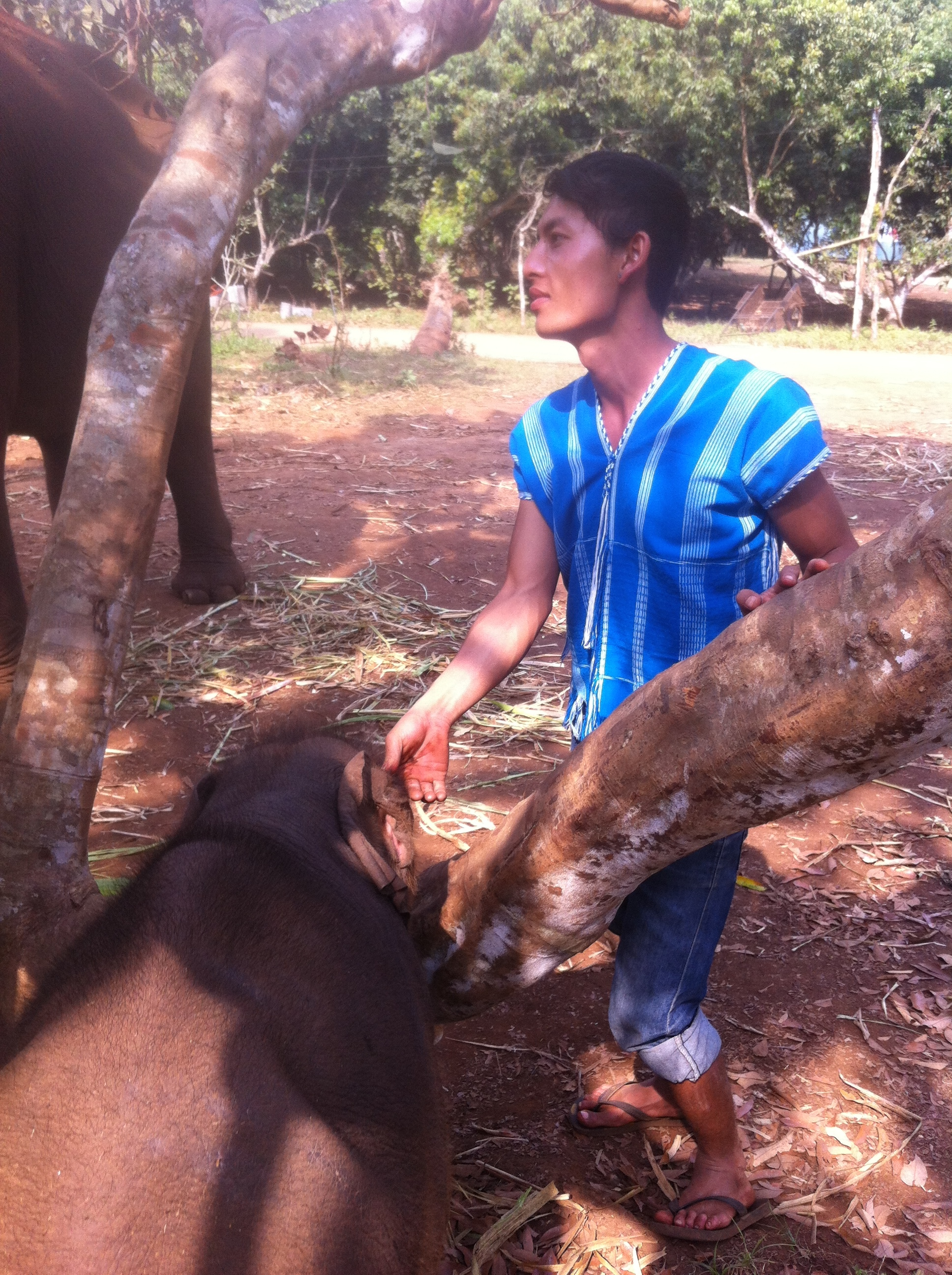
A mahout at Patara

A trip to Patara consists of a hands-on experience where each visitor is given an elephant for either half or all of the day. This program is called “Elephant Owner for a Day”. The program costs around $200 per person, with a maximum of twelve visitors per day. Patara does not receive any of its funding from the Thai government.

== Arrival ==
When visitors first arrive at the farm, they are given shirts and pants traditionally worn by mahouts. Then, they are asked to sit down while Theerapat gives a talk on the history, the state of elephants in Thailand, and why the farm was founded. Visitors are allowed to interact with baby elephants at the farm while the babies' mothers are nearby.

=== Education ===
To communicate with their elephant, visitors, while feeding their elephants, are taught the Thai words boun, which means "open your mouth," and didi, which means "good." Before checking the health of their elephant, visitors are given a demonstration on how to check an elephant's health.

The day ends with a bare-backed elephant ride to nearby temples, waterfalls, or forests.

== See also ==
- Asian elephant
- Mahout
- Wildlife conservation
- Deforestation
- Illegal logging
- Poaching
- Chiang Mai, Thailand
- Tourism in Thailand
- Ecotourism
