= Showaiter =

The Showaiter (Arabic: شويطر) is an Arabic Sunni family based in the Arabian Peninsula, especially the Arab States of the Persian Gulf. In Bahrain, the family is based in Muharraq, which is one of the 33 islands in Bahrain and was the old capital city. They are known as the inventors of a sweet, which is popular in the Persian Gulf region, as Halwa Showaiter.

Hussain Moh'd Showaiter Sweets

== See also ==
- Cuisine of Bahrain
