= Cody Nickson =

American reality television personality (born 1985)

- Born: Cody Lee Nickson; April 13, 1985 (age 41); Lake Mills, Iowa, U.S.
- Spouse: Jessica Graf (m. 2018)
- Children: 6
- Military career
- Allegiance: United States of America
- Branch: United States Air Force; United States Marine Corps
- Service years: 2002–2012
- Rank: Staff Sergeant; Corporal
- Units: Air Force Space Command; 3rd Battalion, 9th Marines
- Conflicts: Iraq War; War in Afghanistan
- Other work: Big Brother 19 (America's Favorite HouseGuest); The Amazing Race 30 (Winner)

Cody Lee Nickson (born April 13, 1985) is an American reality television personality, best known for competing in Big Brother 19 and winning The Amazing Race 30 with his then fiancée Jessica Graf. Previously, Nickson served in the United States Air Force and United States Marine Corps.

== Early life and background ==
Nickson was born in Lake Mills, Iowa and later resided in Plano, Texas. His mother is Darcy Nickson and he has a daughter named Paisley Nickson. Before Big Brother, Nickson joined the United States Air Force at age 17. He served as a 2M0X2 and 1N0X1 in the Air Force before enlisting in the Marines as an 0311 at age 23. Nickson has also served combat tours in the Iraq and Afghanistan wars. He graduated from Collin College with an associate degree in business management.

== Military ==
Nickson initially served in the United States Air Force, but would later transfer into the Marine Corps. After the completion of bootcamp and infantry school, he was assigned to 3rd Battalion, 9th Marines where he would serve as a 0311 Rifleman in combat deployments to Iraq and Afghanistan. Nickson received a commendation for his service. In 2012, Nickson received an Honorable Discharge.

== Television ==
=== Big Brother ===
==== Big Brother 19 ====
Nickson appeared on 19th season of Big Brother. He began a showmance with fellow contestant Jessica Graf. On Day 1, Nickson won the safety competition after Paul did not choose him as one of the 8 HouseGuests to be awarded immunity. Nickson won Head of Household later that week, becoming the first HOH of the season. He nominated Megan and Jillian for eviction. On Day 9, Nickson had to name a replacement nominee and picked Alex after Megan self-evicted herself from the game. After Alex won POV and took herself off the block, he tried to nominate Paul. However, Paul revealed his Pendant of Protection, leaving Nickson to nominate Christmas instead. During week 2, Paul won HOH as well as Power of Veto and chose Nickson as a replacement nominee after saving Josh, his previous nominee, from the block. He endured the Ve-toad curse temptation after Christmas accepted the Temptation offer voted by America, and was evicted from the house on Day 23. Nickson later returned to the house after winning three rounds of the Battle Back Showdown during week 4. During week 5, Paul nominated Cody for eviction alongside Jessica, but she used the Halting Hex saving them both from eviction. He won the second Temptation Competition the next week and became safe. Nickson was named as a replacement nominee by Alex during week 7. He was evicted on day 58 and became the first member of the Jury. Nickson voted for Josh to win Big Brother and won America's Favorite HouseGuest with a prize of $25,000.

==== Big Brother 20 ====
Nickson, alongside Graf appeared on Big Brother 20 to host the second POV competition.

=== The Amazing Race ===
Nickson and Graf also participated in the 30th season of the American television series The Amazing Race. They later became the winners of the season and took home the $1,000,000 prize along with a $5,000 prize they won earlier during the season, becoming the first former Big Brother contestants to win the Amazing Race.

== Personal life ==
Nickson became engaged to Jessica Graf on February 13, 2018. He has a daughter from a previous relationship. In September 2018, Nickson and Graf announced that they were expecting their first child together, and confirmed the following month that they would be having a daughter. Nickson and Graf got married on October 14, 2018. Their daughter was born on March 17, 2019. In May 2020, Nickson and Graf announced that they were expecting their second child together. Their daughter was born on October 5, 2020. In February 2022, Nickson and Graf announced that they were expecting their third child together. Their third daughter was born on July 16, 2022. In July 2023, Nickson and Graf announced that they were expecting their fourth child together. Their fourth daughter was born on December 12, 2023. On October 10, 2025 Nickson and Graf welcomed their fifth child; a baby girl named Italia Belle.

== Controversy ==
Nickson has been criticized for making transphobic remarks during his time on Big Brother 19. In response to criticism on social media, he declined to apologize for his comments. During the COVID-19 pandemic, Nickson promoted his brand of coffee, using "Scamdemic" as a discount promo code. The term has been used by right wing opponents to suggest the pandemic lockdown was a conspiracy and discredit the public health measures being taken by local and federal government.

== Filmography ==
=== Television ===
Year	Title	Role	Notes
2017	Big Brother 19	Contestant	Eliminated; 11th place
2018	The Amazing Race 30	Contestant	Winner (with Jessica Graf)
2018	Big Brother 20	Guest	1 episode

== Awards & recognitions ==
Year	Award	Category	Nominated work	Result	Ref
2018	People's Choice Awards	Competition Contestant of 2018	Winner of The Amazing Race 30	Nominated	
