= United States military occupation =

United States military occupation may refer to:

- A state or period of occupation by the United States military, such as those listed at Territories of the United States § Former U.S. military occupations
- A pejorative term for any activity during the military history of the United States which involved troops in other countries
- A job in the United States Armed Forces, as designated by its United States military occupation code
