= Max Fuchs =

Max Fuchs (1922–2018) was an American soldier and cantor.

== Biography ==
Born in Rzeszów, Poland, he relocated with his family to New York at the age of 12. Fuchs was drafted into the U.S. Army and served as a rifleman in the First Infantry Division. On June 6, 1944, he took part in the D-Day invasion at Omaha Beach, during which he sustained shrapnel wounds.

During the war, Fuchs volunteered as a cantor for a Jewish service broadcast from Germany.The broadcast aired in the United States on NBC. After the war, he studied cantorial music under the G.I. Bill and served as the cantor at the Bayside Jewish Center in Queens for 39 years while working as a diamond cutter.

Fuchs was reserved about his war experiences, though he suffered from recurring nightmares for about 20 years. His participation in the broadcast was documented online, and he was featured in the PBS documentary GI Jews: Jewish Americans in World War II. In 2007, he took part in the rededication of the Eldridge Street Synagogue.
