= Jessica Graf =

American actress (born 1990)

- Born: Jessica Furtado Graf; December 11, 1990 (age 35); Hollywood, Florida, U.S.
- Occupations: Television personality; actress; model
- Television: Big Brother 19; The Amazing Race 30 (Winner)
- Spouse: Cody Nickson (m. 2018)
- Children: 5 + 1 step daughter

Jessica Furtado Nickson (née Graf; born December 11, 1990) is an American reality television personality, actress, and model. She first came to national prominence after competing in Big Brother 19, where she placed 12th. After Big Brother, Graf went on to win The Amazing Race 30 with her fellow Big Brother competitor and then boyfriend (now husband) Cody Nickson.

== Early life ==
Graf was born in Hollywood, Florida to a Brazilian mother Teressa Graf and a father of Italian and German descent Herbert Graf Jr. The family left Florida after Hurricane Andrew in 1992, moving to New York City. After living in New York City for two years, they settled in Cranston, Rhode Island, where Graf and her brother Christopher were raised.

== Reality shows ==
=== Big Brother ===
Graf appeared on the 19th season of Big Brother. She began a showmance with contestant Cody Nickson. On Day 1, Graf received a "friendship" bracelet from Paul Abrahamian from big brother season 18 resulting in being safe from the first eviction. During the first week of the competition, she began a showmance with fellow contestant, Cody Nickson and voted to evict Christmas Abbott after Nickson, Head-of-Household at the time, nominated her for eviction. In week 2, Graf was named as a recipient of the Ve-toad curse after Abbott accepted a temptation offer voted by America, meaning she was required to wear a toad costume and jump between lily pads drawn on the floor of the house. After the pair were isolated from the house by an alliance led by Abrahamian, Nickson was voted out. In week 3, Alex Ow nominated Graf for eviction alongside Dominique Cooper, but she was spared from being voted out after Cooper started to get into fights with the other houseguests. In Week 4, Graf won the third and final temptation from America. She chose to accept the Halting Hex, allowing her to cancel any of the four subsequent evictions, resetting that week. Graf won the Head-of-Household in week 4 after Nickson, her showmance partner, won the Battle Back Showdown and reentered the house. She chose to nominate Ramses Soto and eventual winner Josh Martinez for eviction, expecting for Martinez to be evicted. Graf won the veto competition and chose the keep the nominations the same, but was blindsided when the remaining houseguests chose to evict Soto over Martinez. In week 5, Abrahamian nominated both Graf and Nickson for eviction, but Graf ended up using the Halting Hex that same week, sparing the duo from eviction. In week 6, Martinez won the Head-of-Household competition and while his initial target was Nickson, he managed to win the Temptation Competition, gaining immunity for the week. Graf purposely lost the same Temptation Competition to automatically become the third nominee, providing her with a chance to win the Power of Veto later in the week, saving her from eviction. Graf was unable to do so, ultimately being evicted by a vote of 7-1-0 to Raven Walton and Elena Davies, respectively.

Throughout Graf's stint on Big Brother 19, she had many feuds with the other contestants, most notably Abrahamian, Abbott, Martinez, Walton and Ow. Graf eventually became a fan favourite after being one of the few to recognise Abrahamian's dominance early on in the competition. After Nickson reentered the house, the duo were infamously bullied by many other contestants led by Abrahamian. On the night of the finale, after Martinez was crowned the winner, host Julie Chen asked Graf who she would have voted for in the Final Two (Martinez or Abrahamian). Graf said that she would have voted for Abrahamian as she felt he orchestrated nearly every move throughout the game. The vote was revealed to be 5–4 in favour of Martinez, with Graf's showmance partner, Nickson, casting the deciding vote in favour of Martinez. In post-game interviews, Graf has appreciated the irony that Abrahamian sought to eliminate her before Nickson, when it would have benefited him to eliminate Nickson first as he would have won.

==== Celebrity Big Brother 1 ====
Graf appeared in the series premiere of the Big Brother spin-off Celebrity Big Brother for a special appearance during the first Head of Household competition.

==== Big Brother 20 ====
Graf, alongside Cody Nickson then appeared on Big Brother 20 of to host a Power of Veto Competition.

=== The Amazing Race ===
Graf and her fellow competitor from Big Brother 19 (and then boyfriend) Cody Nickson were sought out to compete on the 30th season of The Amazing Race while Big Brother 19 was still airing. The season began filming on the October 1, just 11 days after filming for Big Brother wrapped up. The duo quickly bonded with fellow competitors Kristi Leskinen and Jen Hudak, and Alex Rossi and Conor Daly. After placing second to Kristi and Jen in the first leg, they managed to win the second leg and a $5,000 cash prize. The pair conflicted with Lucas Bocanegra and Brittany Austin and considered targeting them in the sixth leg, but when they discovered that they were second-to-last, they decided to U-Turn Trevor Wadleigh and Chris Marchant, the only team behind them, resulting in the latter's elimination. In the eighth leg, Lucas and Brittany chose to U-Turn Cody and Jessica, but they were able to still make it to the Pit Stop before Eric and Daniel Guiffreda, narrowly avoiding elimination. Despite being in second place for most of the final leg, Graf was able to finish the final task before the two other remaining teams, ultimately taking out the entire season and winning the $1,000,000 grand prize. Throughout the entire race, they managed to never place below sixth and achieved the second highest average placement behind Kristi and Jen. Graf and Nickson are the first team from another CBS franchise to win The Amazing Race.

== Other television appearances ==
Graf had a role on the soap opera show The Bold and the Beautiful playing the part of Jody the Giardino Waitress. She is set to return with a cameo role in two episodes of The Bold and the Beautiful along with Cody Nickson.

== Personal life ==
Graf began a relationship with Cody Nickson during their time together on Big Brother 19. They continued their relationship outside the house, and competed in The Amazing Race 30 together. They later became engaged on February 13, 2018. Graf and Nickson were married on October 14, 2018. They have five daughters.

== Filmography ==
Year	Title	Role	Notes
2017	Big Brother 19	Herself/Contestant	12th Place
2017–18	The Bold and the Beautiful	Jody, Il Giardino Waitress	4 episodes
2018	The Amazing Race 30	Herself/Contestant	Winner
2018	Celebrity Big Brother 1	Herself	Cameo
2018	Big Brother 20	Herself	Host
