= Big Brother 19 (American season) =

Coordinates: 34°8′40.12″N 118°23′20.71″W

Big Brother
- Season 19
- Digital cover art for Big Brother 19
- Hosted by: Julie Chen
- No. of days: 92
- No. of houseguests: 17
- Winner: Josh Martinez
- Runner-up: Paul Abrahamian
- America's Favorite HouseGuest: Cody Nickson
- Companion shows: Big Brother: Live Chat; Big Brother: After Dark
- No. of episodes: 39

Release
- Original network: CBS
- Original release: June 28 – September 20, 2017

Additional information
- Filming dates: June 21 – September 20, 2017

Season chronology
- ← Previous; Season 18 Next → Season 20

Big Brother 19 is the nineteenth season of the American reality television series Big Brother. The season featured a temptation theme. It premiered on June 28, 2017, with a 2-hour season premiere, broadcast on CBS in the United States and Global in Canada, and ended with a 2-hour season finale on September 20, 2017, after 92 days of competition. Julie Chen returned as host. On September 20, 2017, Josh Martinez was crowned the winner defeating season 18 runner-up Paul Abrahamian in a 5-4 jury vote, earning the latter the distinction of being the first person to receive the runner-up prize two years consecutively. Cody Nickson was voted as the season's America's Favorite HouseGuest.

The season received negative reviews and sparked numerous controversies over bullying, racism, rape jokes, transphobia, and inappropriate behavior exhibited by a few of the HouseGuests. It is considered to be one of the worst seasons in the show's history.

== Format ==
Big Brother follows a group of contestants, known as HouseGuests, who live inside a custom-built house outfitted with cameras and microphones recording their every move 24 hours a day. The HouseGuests are sequestered with no contact with the outside world. During their stay, the HouseGuests share their thoughts on their day-to-day lives inside the house in a private room known as the Diary Room. Each week, the HouseGuests compete in competitions in order to win power and safety inside the house. At the start of each week, the HouseGuests compete in a Head of Household (abbreviated as "HOH") competition. The winner of the HoH competition is immune from eviction and selects two HouseGuests to be nominated for eviction. Six HouseGuests are then selected to compete in the Power of Veto (abbreviated as "PoV") competition: the reigning HoH, the nominees, and three other HouseGuests chosen by random draw. The winner of the PoV competition has the right to either revoke the nomination of one of the nominated HouseGuests or leave them as is. If the veto winner uses this power, the HoH must immediately nominate another HouseGuest for eviction. The PoV winner is also immune from being named as the replacement nominee. On eviction night, all HouseGuests vote to evict one of the nominees, though the Head of Household and the nominees are not allowed to vote. This vote is conducted in the privacy of the Diary Room. In the event of a tie, the Head of Household casts the tie-breaking vote. The nominee with the most votes is evicted from the house. The last nine evicted HouseGuests comprise the Jury and are sequestered in a separate location following their eviction and ultimately decide the winner of the season. The Jury is only allowed to see the competitions and ceremonies that include all of the remaining HouseGuests; they are not shown any interviews or other footage that might include strategy or details regarding nominations. The viewing public is able to award an additional prize of $25,000 by choosing "America's Favorite HouseGuest". All evicted HouseGuests are eligible to win this award except for those who either voluntarily leave or are forcibly removed for rule violations.

=== Format changes and additions ===
Changes to the main format known as twists occur during the course of the season that will impact the lives of the House Guests during their time in the House. The twists for this season center around the theme of temptation where the House Guests will be tempted with money, power or safety during their stay. Each temptation however will come with a consequence that will impact the entire House. The overall main twist is being billed by the program as "The Summer of Temptation" for this reason.

==== Standard Temptations ====
During the season premiere the House Guests were presented with the first temptation of the season, in which each new House Guest had a chance to secretly win $25,000. Kevin Schlehuber was the quickest to claim the monetary prize, resulting in two different consequences. The first consequence was personal: Kevin was not allowed to win the first Head of Household competition; to keep his winning a secret, he had to throw (intentionally lose) the competition.

The second consequence unleashed a major twist on the House called the "BB Swap." This resulted in Paul Abrahamian, runner-up from the previous season, entering the House as a full House Guest eligible to win by taking the place of an original House Guest. Shortly after entering Paul was given nine friendship bracelets which gave immunity from the first eviction. Paul was instructed to take one for themselves and give the remaining eight friendship bracelets to the House Guests that did a good job tempting them. The remaining eight House Guests took part in a competition for safety which resulted in Cameron, Christmas, and Jillian being nominated for eviction. The three nominees were given the power to choose how their fate would be determined. The nominees had a choice of a competition or a house eviction vote. Only Cameron chose to have a competition; shortly after, the House Guests voted to evict Cameron from the House.

The following temptation would be during the second Week 1 HOH competition. During the competition, a golden apple appeared that would guarantee safety for the person who grabbed it, but would eliminate the team from the competition. Josh took the temptation, eliminating his team from the HOH competition. In the Week 1 Power of Veto competition, the first House Guest to find a gold starfish and place it on their shelf would earn a Never-Not pass, meaning they cannot be a Have-Not for the rest of the season with the consequence of eliminating themselves from the competition. Raven took the temptation.

==== Battle Back Showdown ====
Instead of permanent eviction, the first four evicted House Guests received a chance to return to the game. Unlike last season, this showdown was done in playoff style. They will participate in a 3-Round-Battle in order to gain their spot back in the house. The first competition "Maze Race" will eliminate the bottom two finishers, permanently eliminating them from the game. Dominique and Jillian lost the competition to Cody and Cameron respectively; The second Competition between Cody and Cameron determined which of the first four evicted House Guests will be the last one standing and battle one of the House Guests in the house for a chance to get back to the house. If the evicted House Guest wins against the current House Guest, the remaining evictee will have a second chance to re-enter the house. However, if the current House Guest defeats the returning evictee, no one will be returning to the house effectively blocking the Battle Back. The House Guests unanimously voted to choose Paul to battle Cody in the final competition. Cody chose "Maze Race" as the final competition. Cody won and re-entered the house on Day 30. All three duels aired in a special episode on July 21.

Round	Winner(s)	Loser(s)
1	Cody, Cameron	Dominique, Jillian
2	Cody	Cameron
3	Cody	Paul

==== Den of Temptation ====
During the first three weeks of the season, the viewing public voted for a HouseGuest to secretly enter a room called the Den of Temptation. The temptation inside could provide an advantage in the game, but also came with a consequence. The public's chosen HouseGuest could choose to accept the temptation or reject it completely. Each HouseGuest could only be chosen to enter the Den once during their time in the House.

No.	Temptation	Consequence	HouseGuest	Consequence Recipient	Result
1	Pendant of Protection; The HouseGuest will be immune from the next three evictions.	The HouseGuest must pick a poison that is tied to another HouseGuest. The HouseGuest whose poison was chosen is now "cursed" and must volunteer to be a third nominee for eviction once over the next three weeks.	Paul	Ramses	Accepted
2	Ring of Replacement; The HouseGuest will have the power to swap with one of the randomly drawn players in the Power of Veto competition and take their place.	The HouseGuest must choose three HouseGuests to wear "Ve-Toad" costumes for the rest of the week.	Christmas	Cody, Jason, Jessica	Accepted
3	Halting Hex; The HouseGuest will have the power to cancel one of the next four evictions.	The Temptation Competition will be unleashed over the next three weeks.	Jessica	All HouseGuests	Accepted

==== Temptation Competition ====
Due to Jessica accepting the final temptation, the Temptation Competition was unleashed over the next three weeks. Prior to nominations, HouseGuests (except for the current Head of Household) could decide if they wanted to compete in this competition or not. The winner of the Temptation Competition would receive immunity for the week; however, the HouseGuest who finished last in the competition would automatically become a 3rd nominee.

Week	Competitors	Winner	Loser
5	Alex, Jason, Mark, Matt	Mark	Jason
6	Alex, Cody, Elena, Jason, Jessica, Kevin, Mark, Matt, Paul, Raven	Cody	Jessica
7	Cody, Elena, Jason, Josh, Kevin, Mark, Matt, Paul, Raven	Mark	Matt

==== Tree of Temptation ====
After Cody and Elena's eviction, Julie revealed a new twist into the game, unleashing five possible temptations for HouseGuests to select over the next three weeks. These temptations included powers and punishments. When the apple tree turned red, the first HouseGuest to enter the Diary Room got to claim a temptation from the apple tree. Once a HouseGuest claimed an apple, they were not eligible for another temptation.

The 5 available temptations were Save a Friend, Can't Play in Next HOH, Second Veto, Bounty on Your Head, and Eliminate two Eviction Votes.

Week	Name	Description	Picker	Result
8	Save a Friend	The holder can award immunity to another HouseGuest for the week.	Mark	Paul
9	None^{(Note: No one decided to choose an apple temptation.)}			
10	None			

== HouseGuests ==
The cast of the nineteenth season of Big Brother. Top: Ramses, Christmas, Jessica, Mark, Josh, Raven, Dominique and Jason Middle row: Paul, Jillian, Matt, Megan, Alex, Cody and Cameron Bottom: Elena and Kevin

The House Guests were announced on Monday, June 19 at 6 AM PDT through the CBS website. Interviews with the cast were released at 8 AM PDT on CBS All Access. The cast includes season 18 HouseGuest Paul Abrahamian.

Name	Age on entry	Occupation	Residence	Day entered	Result
Josh Martinez	23	Haircare sales	Homestead, Florida	1	Winner; Day 92
Paul Abrahamian Big Brother 18	24	Clothing designer	Tarzana, California	1	Runner-up; Day 92
Christmas Abbott	35	Fitness superstar	Raleigh, North Carolina	1	Evicted; Day 92
Kevin Schlehuber	55	Stay-at-home dad	Boston, Massachusetts	1	Evicted; Day 86
Alex Ow	28	Eco-friendly marketing representative	Camarillo, California	1	Evicted; Day 84
Raven Walton	23	Dance teacher	DeValls Bluff, Arkansas	1	Evicted; Day 79
Jason Dent	37	Rodeo clown	Humeston, Iowa	1	Evicted; Day 79
Matt Clines	33	Renovation consultant	Arlington, Virginia	1	Evicted; Day 72
Mark Jansen	26	Personal trainer	Grand Island, New York	1	Evicted; Day 65
Elena Davies	26	Radio personality	Dallas, Texas	1	Evicted; Day 58
Cody Nickson	32	Construction sales representative	Plano, Texas	30	Evicted; Day 58
Cody Nickson	32	Construction sales representative	Plano, Texas	1	Evicted; Day 23
Jessica Graf	26	VIP concierge	Los Angeles, California	1	Evicted; Day 51
Ramses Soto	21	Cosplay artist	Grand Rapids, Michigan	1	Evicted; Day 37
Dominique Cooper	30	Government engineer	Woodbridge, Virginia	1	Evicted; Day 30
Jillian Parker	24	Timeshare sales representative	Las Vegas, Nevada	1	Evicted; Day 16
Megan Lowder	28	Dog walker	Phoenix, Arizona	1	Walked; Day 8
Cameron Heard	24	Microbiologist	Woodridge, Illinois	1	Evicted; Day 1

=== Future appearances ===
In 2018, Jessica Graf and Cody Nickson competed on The Amazing Race 30. Shortly after, Paul Abrahamian also appeared alongside Graf and Nickson in a cameo appearance on the series premiere of Celebrity Big Brother during the first HoH competition of the season. Graf and Nickson appeared on Big Brother 20 to host a Power of Veto competition. Abrahamian also appeared alongside Josh Martinez to celebrate Nicole Franzel and Victor Arroyo's engagement. Graf, Martinez, and Nickson all made an appearance in the fifth episode of Off the Block with Ross and Marissa.

In 2019, Josh Martinez competed on The Challenge: War of the Worlds and The Challenge: War of the Worlds 2. Elena Davies and Mark Jansen appeared on the third season of Ex on the Beach.

In 2020, Martinez competed on The Challenge: Total Madness and The Challenge: Double Agents. Christmas Abbott returned to compete for a second time on Big Brother: All-Stars.

In 2021, Martinez competed on The Challenge: Spies, Lies & Allies, thus being the first contestant from Big Brother to compete on five consecutive seasons of The Challenge.

In 2023, Martinez competed on the second season of The Challenge: USA. Martinez also competed on the holiday spin-off Big Brother Reindeer Games.

In 2024, Martinez competed on The Challenge 40: Battle of the Eras. Martinez competed on the second season of the Telemundo reality TV series Los 50.

In 2025, Martinez competed on the first season of Destination X on NBC.

In 2026, Martinez competed on the sixth season of La casa de los famosos, the Spanish language Celebrity edition of Big Brother.. Paul Abrahamian competed on the third season of House of Villains

== Episodes ==
No. overall	No. in season	Title	Day(s)	Original release date	U.S. viewers (millions)	Rating/share (18–49)
Week 1
628	1	"Episode 1"	Day 1	June 28, 2017	5.88	1.7/7
On Day 1, 16 new HouseGuests entered the newest rendition of the Big Brother House. After getting settled in and introductions were done, they were then informed by series host Julie Chen that the theme for this season is "Summer of Temptation", where they would face various offers during the game that would offer them prizes and unique game-changing advantages throughout the season. However, every temptation that was accepted in the House would have a consequence that would affect at least one of the other HouseGuests. They began the summer inside the Garden of Temptation, the first competition of the season.: Temptation Competition ("Garden of Temptation"): The HouseGuests, while sequestered in 16 separate pods, were given the offer of $25,000. A flower was placed in front of the pods and the first HouseGuest to press their button when the flower lit up green would win the money. The identity of the person who pressed the button to accept the money would remain anonymous, however their actions would unleash the first twist of the season. Kevin accepted the offer, but in doing so it required him to throw the first Head of Household competition as he was now ineligible to win it.; As another consequence for Kevin pressing the button, Paul from Big Brother 18 re-entered the House as the seventeenth HouseGuest. However, it was revealed by Chen that he would be swapping spots with one of the new HouseGuests that would be evicted the same night in a first-ever "BB Swap". Paul was given the task to select eight HouseGuests to receive a "friendship" bracelet. Any HouseGuest who received a "friendship" bracelet would be immune from eviction. He gave bracelets to Kevin, Raven, Dominique, Mark, Jason, Jessica, Ramses, and Elena.: Safety Competition ("Tempted by the Fruit"): The remaining eight HouseGuests battled for their lives in the Tempted by the Fruit competition. In this competition, HouseGuests had to stand on a trapeze bar while holding on to a rope. If a HouseGuest fell off, they had to select an apple from a serpent. Four apples contained safety, while three apples were "poisonous". As the competition continued, Julie would give them clues guiding them to the four safe apples. The last HouseGuest standing would guarantee his or her safety from the eviction, and the three HouseGuests with poisonous apples would be nominated for the first eviction. Cody was the winner; Christmas, Cameron, and Jillian had the poisoned apples and were put on the block. The nominees were then presented with their own temptation. Each nominee had the power to decide how their fate would ultimately be determined. They would each decide to either face an eviction vote or compete in an eviction competition, with the top 2 finishers guaranteed safety and the third-place finisher automatically evicted. By a vote of 2-1, they decided to face an eviction vote, with Cameron voting for an eviction competition.; On Day 1, Cameron was evicted by an 8-3-2 vote, with Cody, Mark, and Matt voting to evict Jillian, and Josh and Jason voting to evict Christmas. Julie then revealed the next twist to the viewers. Each week, America would vote to select one HouseGuest to enter the "Den of Temptation." Inside the Den, they would be offered a temptation. A HouseGuest is only able to be selected once throughout the entire season. However, every temptation will come with a consequence.
629	2	"Episode 2"	Days 1–8	June 29, 2017	5.37	1.6/7
Following Cameron's eviction: Head of Household ("Hangs in the Balance"): Big Brother 18 winner Nicole hosted the HouseGuests in the Hangs in the Balance Head of Household competition. In this competition, HouseGuests were divided into four same-gender teams. One at a time, HouseGuests had to swing across their ropes and grab a rotten apple and then return it to their station. However, they were all tempted by a golden apple: the first HouseGuest to return a golden apple would earn safety for the week, but would also eliminate their entire team from the competition. Josh took the temptation, eliminating his team. The first two teams to retrieve eight apples would advance to the second round of the competition. The pink team and the blue team were the winners, who then went head-to-head to balance seven apples on a tree. However, only one person per team could compete. The first HouseGuest to successfully balance their apples would be the first Head of Household. Cody was the winner.; On Day 5, Cody nominated Jillian and Megan for eviction. As Head of Household, Cody was required to name five Have-Nots for the week. He selected Megan, Josh, Jillian, Paul, and Ramses. However, the Have-Nots were offered a temptation. On the wall of the Have-Not room, there were two available spikes. Inside one spike is a Have-Not Escape which would allow its holder to leave the Have-Not Room and become a Have for the week. However, the other held a Have-Not Extension, making the holder a Have-Not for an extra week. One Have-Not per week could go to the Diary Room to claim the key to unlock a spike. On Day 8, Megan withdrew from the house following an argument with numerous HouseGuests over an alleged racial slur.
630	3	"Episode 3"	Days 8–9	July 2, 2017	5.16	1.4/7
Following Megan's departure: Paul took the Have-Not temptation and successfully claimed the Have-Not Escape. The HouseGuests learned of the Den of Temptation. Paul was given the offer of the Pendant of Protection, which would give him immunity for the next three evictions. By accepting the offer, another HouseGuest would be cursed. Whichever HouseGuest was represented by the chosen bottle would be the consequence recipient. On Day 9, Cody nominated Alex to replace Megan on the block alongside Jillian. As consequence for Paul accepting the Pendant, one HouseGuest was "bitten" by a snake inside the Den. The HouseGuest bitten will be cursed and be given further instructions by Big Brother. Ramses was bitten and learned that he must place himself on the block as a third nominee within one of the next three nomination ceremonies.
631	4	"Episode 4"	Days 9–11	July 5, 2017	6.15	1.8/8
Power of Veto ("Fin to Win"): On Day 9, Cody, Alex, and Jillian, alongside Matt, Raven, and Jason, scrapped in the Fin to Win Power of Veto competition, which was hosted by Kevin. In this competition, HouseGuests had to pull the plug on their water timer, causing it to drain. They had to then search the water for starfish and put them on their stacking shelf one at a time. If their water began to run low, they could collect water from the ocean to put in their timer. Once a HouseGuest's water timer was empty, their starfish were locked in. However, the players were also offered a temptation. The first HouseGuest to find a gold starfish and place it on their shelf would earn a Never-Not pass, meaning they cannot be a Have-Not for the rest of the season. However, they would eliminate themselves from the competition. Raven took the temptation. The HouseGuest with the most starfish stacked on their shelf after their water had drained would win the Power of Veto. Alex won the Power of Veto.; On Day 11, Alex took herself off the block, and Cody attempted to nominate Paul, who was immune thanks to the Pendant of Protection. This led Cody to nominate Christmas as the third replacement nominee.
632	5	"Episode 5"	Days 11–16	July 6, 2017	6.09	1.9/8
Christmas broke her foot in multiple places as well as tearing some ligaments when she and Jason were clowning around in the backyard. Even though Christmas was Cody's target, many people were angry with Cody's unforeseen nomination of Christmas. On Day 16, Jillian was evicted by an 8-4 vote, with Alex, Jason, Jessica, and Ramses voting to evict Christmas.
Week 2
633	6	"Episode 6"	Days 16–17	July 9, 2017	6.39	1.8/8
Head of Household ("Sugar Shot"): Sponsored by the new CBS game show Candy Crush. In this competition, candies would fall into the yard. The HouseGuests needed to search the candies for tickets. Each ticket would give them one shot on the board. HouseGuests could exchange tickets and take up to three shots at one time. The first HouseGuest to land a ball in the center heart would be the new Head of Household. Paul was the winner. Cody, Jason, Jessica, and Matt became the Have-Nots for the week.; On Day 17, Christmas was tempted with the "Ring of Replacement" inside the Den. If she accepts this temptation, she can replace a randomly drawn player in any Veto competition this season. She accepted the temptation. She was then required to select three HouseGuests for the curse, and these three will be the only people Christmas has the option to replace. She selected Cody, Jessica, and Jason. On Day 17, Paul nominated Alex and Josh for eviction, with the plan to backdoor Cody, while Ramses revealed his curse and named himself as a third nominee. As consequence for Christmas accepting the temptation, Cody, Jessica, and Jason had to wear toad suits for the week. Jason accepted the Have-Not temptation and claimed the Have-Not Extension.
634	7	"Episode 7"	Days 18–20	July 12, 2017	6.45	1.9/9
Power of Veto ("Path of Least Resistance"): On Day 18, Paul, Alex, Josh, and Ramses, alongside Elena and Matt, recalled in the Path of Least Resistance Power of Veto competition. In this competition, HouseGuests competed individually. They must go through a series of rooms and answer questions based on what they have seen throughout the previous rooms. If they answer a question correctly, they may walk through a quicker path. If they answer incorrectly, they must take a delayed path that contains a challenge that will slow them down. The HouseGuest to make it through all five areas in the fastest time will win the Power of Veto. Paul was the winner.; On Day 20, Paul took Josh off the block and named Cody as the replacement nominee.
635	8	"Episode 8"	Day 20–23	July 13, 2017	6.11	1.8/8
On Day 23, Cody was evicted by a 7-3-0 vote, with Christmas, Jessica, and Kevin voting to evict Ramses. Julie then informed Cody and America that the first four evicted HouseGuests would compete in the "Battle Back Showdown" with a chance to return to the game. Due to Christmas' foot injury in the previous week, she was offered two options for the rest of her game: to either receive the medical treatments in the BB House with her having to sit out of some games as she would not be medically eligible to compete, or exit the BB House immediately. She decided to stay in the House. As a result, she cast her eviction vote from the hospital nearby and was sidelined for the following HOH competition.
Week 3
636	9	"Episode 9"	Days 23–24	July 16, 2017	5.95	1.8/8
Head of Household ("Space Cadets"): The HouseGuests blasted off in the Space Cadets Head of Household competition. In this competition, HouseGuests stood on a small foothold and held on to their handles, trying to stay on the side of the space station. The last HouseGuest standing will be the new Head of Household. Alex was the winner.; On Day 24, Alex nominated Dominique and Jessica for eviction.
637	10	"Episode 10"	Days 25–27	July 19, 2017	6.19	1.9/8
Power of Veto ("Temple of Temptation"): On Day 25, Alex, Dominique, and Jessica, joined by Kevin, Christmas, and Jason, felt the heat in the Temple of Temptation Power of Veto competition. In this competition, HouseGuests must walk across their suspended beam and hit their statue. They must then return and hit their button again. Each time they hit their button, they will earn a point. If they fall in the lava, however, their counter will reset to zero. However, the HouseGuests were also offered a temptation. The first HouseGuest to lift their golden cup will earn a money prize, but they will eliminate themselves from the competition. The first HouseGuest to get fifty points will win the Power of Veto. Kevin claimed the temptation of $27. Jason was the winner. On Day 27, Jason decided not to use the Power of Veto.
638	11	"Episode 11"	Days 28–30	July 20, 2017	5.96	1.9/7
On Day 28, Jessica was tempted with the "Halting Hex". If she accepts this temptation, she can cancel any of the next four evictions. She accepted the offer. On Day 30, Dominique was evicted by a 10-0 vote. The HouseGuests were then informed of the "Battle Back Showdown". The evicted HouseGuests would face off in a series of head-to-head matches, with the winner facing the next evicted HouseGuest. The last standing will have a second chance at the game.
639	12	"Episode 12"	Day 30	July 21, 2017	5.45	1.5/7
Battle Back, Round 1 ("Maze Race"): The first competition "Maze Race" will eliminate the bottom two finishers, permanently eliminating them from the game. Dominique and Jillian lost the competition to Cody and Cameron respectively.; Battle Back, Round 2: The second Competition between Cody and Cameron determined which first four evicted HouseGuest will be the last one standing and battle one of the HouseGuests in the house for a chance to get back to the house.; Battle Back, Round 3 ("Maze Race"): If the evicted HouseGuest wins against the current HouseGuest, the remaining evictee will have a second chance to re-enter the house. However, if the current HouseGuest defeats the returning evictee, no one will be returning to the house, effectively blocking the Battle Back. The HouseGuests unanimously voted to choose Paul to battle Cody in the final competition. Cody chose the "Maze Race" as the final competition. Cody won and re-entered the house on Day 30.
Week 4
640	13	"Episode 13"	Days 30–31	July 23, 2017	5.98	1.8/7
Following Dominique's eviction and Cody's return: Head of Household ("What's the Hold Up?"): The HouseGuests stuck it out in the What's the Hold Up? Head of Household competition. In this competition, HouseGuests must press their red traffic disk up by pressing it against their board with their stick. If a HouseGuest drops their disk, they will be eliminated. As a HouseGuest is eliminated, they must select a HouseGuest to punish, making it more difficult for them to continue. The last HouseGuest standing will be the new Head of Household. Jessica was the winner.; For being the first three HouseGuests out of the Head of Household competition, Kevin, Mark, and Paul, as well as Josh, became Have-Nots for the week. On Day 31, Jessica nominated Josh and Ramses for eviction. Mark accepted the Have-Not temptation and received the Have-Not Extension.
641	14	"Episode 14"	Days 32–34	July 26, 2017	6.35	1.8/8
Power of Veto ("BB Juicy Blast"): On Day 32, Jessica, Josh, and Ramses mixed it up with Cody, Jason, and Christmas in the BB Juicy Blast Power of Veto competition. In this competition, HouseGuests will watch the monitor to see a sequence of smoothie ingredients. After the sequence, they will be asked a question based on the sequence they just saw. If a HouseGuest answers incorrectly, they will be eliminated. The last HouseGuest standing will win the Power of Veto. Jessica was the winner.; On Day 34, Jessica decided not to use the Power of Veto.
642	15	"Episode 15"	Days 34–37	July 27, 2017	6.33	1.9/8
Paul hoped to flip the vote and keep Josh safe and use him to go after Jessica and Cody. On Day 37, Ramses was evicted by a 7-3 vote, with Cody, Mark, and Elena voting to evict Josh. Julie revealed to the viewers that as consequence for Jessica accepting the temptation last week, a new competition known as the "Temptation Competition" would be in play for the next three weeks. Each week, each HouseGuest will decide whether or not they wish to participate in the competition. The HouseGuest who wins the competition will earn safety for the week. However, the HouseGuest who places last in the competition will be a third nominee for the week.: Head of Household ("Inked and Evicted"): The HouseGuests were quizzed in the Inked and Evicted Head of Household competition. In this competition, HouseGuests were asked a series of questions based on photos of the evicted HouseGuests. An incorrect answer resulted in elimination. The last HouseGuest standing will be the new Head of Household. Paul was the winner.
Week 5
643	16	"Episode 16"	Days 37–38	July 30, 2017	6.33	1.9/8
Temptation Competition ("Bowlerina"): On Day 38, the HouseGuests learned of the Temptation Competition. Alex, Jason, Mark, and Matt decided to compete in the competition. The four then danced in the Bowlerina Temptation Competition. In this competition, HouseGuests competed individually. They must spin around their handle fifteen times. They will then earn 15 seconds of bowling time. If they run out of time, they must spin again to earn more time. The HouseGuest who knocks down their four pins the fastest will win safety for the week, while the slowest competitor will be on the block as a third nominee. Mark was the winner, and Jason became the third nominee.; On Day 38, Paul nominated Cody and Jessica for eviction. Elena accepted the Have-Not temptation and received the Have-Not Extension.
644	17	"Episode 17"	Days 39–41	August 2, 2017	6.57	1.9/8
Power of Veto ("Under the Weather"): On Day 39, Paul, Jessica, Cody, and Jason, accompanied by Kevin and Raven, weathered the pain in the returned Under the Weather Power of Veto competition. The day before the competition, HouseGuests listened to a series of BB Storm Watch updates. In this competition, HouseGuests competed individually. HouseGuests looked at a teleprompter for sentences with blanks. HouseGuests had to report the weather and fill in the blanks with the name of one of the first four evicted HouseGuests while standing in a storm. If the sentence passes through the teleprompter before the HouseGuest fills in the blank, they will be incorrect. The HouseGuest who fills in the most blanks correctly will win the Power of Veto. Paul was the winner.
645	18	"Episode 18"	Days 41–44	August 3, 2017	6.42	1.9/8
On Day 41, Paul used the Power of Veto on Jason. On Day 44, Jessica used the Halting Hex and cancelled the eviction.: Head of Household ("Gravestone Golf"): The HouseGuests putted for power in the Gravestone Golf Head of Household competition. In this competition, each HouseGuest will putt their eye ball down the course, attempting to land it in the highest numbered slot possible. The slot their ball lands in will be their score. The HouseGuest with the highest score will be the new Head of Household. Josh was the winner.
Week 6
646	19	"Episode 19"	Days 44–45	August 6, 2017	6.46	2.0/8
Temptation Competition ("Strangest Things"): On Day 45, all HouseGuests except Christmas accepted the offer to compete in the Temptation Competition. The HouseGuests then blacked out in the Strangest Things Temptation Competition. In this competition, HouseGuests competed individually. They must walk through the pitch black House in search of phrases written on the wall. Each phrase will have a circled letter. They must unscramble the circled letters, locate the correct item, and put it in the box. The HouseGuest who locates the item and puts it in the box in the fastest time will win safety for the week, while the HouseGuest with the slowest time will be a third nominee for the week. Cody was the winner, and Jessica became the third nominee.; On Day 45, Josh nominated Elena and Mark for eviction.
647	20	"Episode 20"	Days 46–48	August 9, 2017	6.39	1.9/8
Power of Veto: ("OTEV the Possessed Piglet"): On Day 46, Josh, Mark, Elena, and Jessica, plus Alex, and Christmas, after she used her Ring of Replacement to take Cody's spot, vied in the OTEV the Possessed Piglet Power of Veto competition. Christmas was not allowed to compete. In each round of this competition, HouseGuests received a question with a number answer. They must search the field for the shoe with the correct number, and return it to OTEV and kneel on a stump. However, there will always be one less stump than HouseGuests. The last HouseGuest to return with the correct number will be eliminated. The last HouseGuest standing will win the Power of Veto. Mark was the winner.; On Day 48, Mark used the Power of Veto on himself, and Josh named Raven as the replacement nominee.
648	21	"Episode 21"	Day 48–51	August 10, 2017	5.95	1.9/8
On Day 51, Jessica was evicted by a 7-1-0 vote, with Cody voting to evict Raven.: Head of Household ("Hocus Focus"): The HouseGuests were put under a spell in the Hocus Focus Head of Household competition. In this competition, HouseGuests watched a series of magic performances. After each performance, the HouseGuests will be asked questions based on the performance. An incorrect answer resulted in elimination. The last HouseGuest standing will be the new Head of Household. Alex was the winner.
Week 7
649	22	"Episode 22"	Days 51–52	August 13, 2017	6.22	1.9/8
For being the first four HouseGuests eliminated in the Head of Household competition, Kevin, Mark, Jason, and Paul became Have-Nots for the week.: Temptation Competition ("Where Were You?"): The day before the Temptation Competition, the HouseGuests were surprised by a series of random sounds. All HouseGuests except Christmas accepted the offer to compete in the Temptation Competition. On Day 52, the HouseGuests were irritated in the Where Were You? Temptation Competition. In this competition, HouseGuests were asked where they were in the House when a specific sound went off. They must then stand on their location on the blueprint of the House. Each correct answer earns HouseGuests a point. The HouseGuest with the most points after ten questions will win safety for the week, and the HouseGuest with the fewest points will be the third nominee for the week. Mark was the winner, and Matt became the third nominee for the week.; On Day 52, Alex nominated Elena and Jason for eviction. Mark accepted the Have-Not temptation and claimed the Have-Not Escape.
650	23	"Episode 23"	Days 53–55	August 16, 2017	6.27	1.9/8
Power of Veto ("BB Adventure Tour"): On Day 53, Alex, Elena, Jason, and Matt, alongside Paul and Mark, launched in the BB Adventure Tour Power of Veto competition, sponsored by Outback Steakhouse. In each round of this competition, each HouseGuest shot an arrow at a map with a series of numbers. After a spot is landed on, it is out of play. The HouseGuest with the lowest score will be eliminated. However, when they are eliminated, they will open a prize. HouseGuests eliminated in future rounds will have the option to swap their prize with a prize that was already revealed. The HouseGuest with the veto at the end will win the Power of Veto, as well as the option to select five HouseGuests to join them for a meal from Outback Steakhouse. Elena claimed $5000, Alex earned the Camp Guide, Paul won a skydiving outfit to share with another HouseGuest; he selected Christmas. Mark won a trip to Colorado, and Jason won the Extreme-itard. Matt won the Power of Veto.; Matt selected Mark, Elena, Paul, Alex, and Jason for the Outback dinner. However Paul gave up the dinner suggesting that Christmas take his place. On Day 55, Matt used the Power of Veto on Jason, and Alex named Cody as the replacement nominee.
651	24	"Episode 24"	Days 55–58	August 17, 2017	6.48	2.1/8
On Day 58, Julie informed the HouseGuests of the Double Eviction. On Day 58, Cody was re-evicted by a 7-0-0 vote. He became the first member of the Jury. Immediately following Cody's eviction: Head of Household ("Let It Slide"): The HouseGuests slid in the Let It Slide Head of Household competition. In this competition, HouseGuests competed in head-to-head matches. They will each slide a shuffleboard disc down their lane. The HouseGuest with a puck closest to the edge without falling off will win the match and eliminate their opponent. The remaining HouseGuest will then select the next two HouseGuests to face off. The last HouseGuest standing will be the new Head of Household. Jason was the winner.; He immediately nominated Elena and Mark for eviction.: Power of Veto ("Kenya-Solve It"): Jason, Elena, Mark, Raven, Josh, and Matt then were puzzled in the Kenya-Solve It Power of Veto competition. In this competition, HouseGuests must solve a series of three puzzles, one at a time. Their puzzle pieces must be inside the black outline. The first HouseGuest to complete all three puzzles and buzz in will win the Power of Veto. Mark was the winner.; At the Veto meeting, Mark used the Power of Veto on himself, and Jason named Matt as the replacement nominee. On Day 58, Elena was evicted by a 6-1 vote, with Mark voting to evict Matt. She became the second member of the Jury.
652	25	"Episode 25"	Day 58; Various (Note: In Episodes 25 and 38, the HouseGuests looked back over their time in the Big Brother house. Flashbacks included clips from previous Days in the house, while the current Days in the house were 58 and 86–91, respectively)	August 18, 2017	5.06	1.4/7
Following Cody and Elena's eviction: Derrick from Big Brother 16 surprised the HouseGuests, and they took the opportunity to reflect on the season.
Week 8
653	26	"Episode 26"	Days 58–59	August 20, 2017	6.42	1.8/7
Head of Household ("Tales from Decrypt"): Derrick then hosted the HouseGuests in the Tales from Decrypt Head of Household competition. In this competition, HouseGuests competed in a tournament-style bracket. In each head-to-head match, the HouseGuests will watch a crypted message be slowly revealed. They must decrypt the message and press the button of the correct HouseGuest. If they are correct, they will advance and eliminate their opponent. If they are incorrect, they will be eliminated and their opponent will advance. The last HouseGuest standing will be the new Head of Household. Christmas was the winner.; For being the first two HouseGuests eliminated in the Head of Household competition, Mark and Josh became Have-Nots for the week. On Day 59, the HouseGuests learned of the Tree of Temptation. In the front hallway is a tree with five apples on it. For the next three weeks, HouseGuests must wait for the tree to turn red. After it turns red, the first HouseGuest to enter the Diary Room may claim an apple. A HouseGuest may only accept one apple while the twist is in play. Each apple contains a prize or a punishment, but the HouseGuests will not know what is inside until they open it. On Day 59, the Tree of Temptation turned red. Mark accepted the temptation. His apple contained the "Save-A-Friend" power. He earned the power to grant one HouseGuest other than himself immunity for the week. He gave Paul immunity for the week. On Day 59, Christmas nominated Jason and Matt for eviction, with the intention to backdoor Mark.
654	27	"Episode 27"	Day 59–62	August 23, 2017	6.10	1.8/7
Power of Veto ("Home Zing Home"): On Day 60, Zingbot surprised the HouseGuests to host them for the Power of Veto competition. Christmas, Jason, and Matt, as well as Raven, Paul, and Mark, slipped in the Home Zing Home Power of Veto competition. In this competition, HouseGuests must fill up their cup, walk down their slippery lane, and pour it into their bowl. They must then walk back down their lane and do it again. There are two bowls for HouseGuests to fill. If they fill their small bowl, they will receive a larger cup with which to fill their large bowl. The first HouseGuest to fill their large bowl enough to retrieve their ball inside will win the Power of Veto. Jason was the winner.; On Day 62, Jason used the Power of Veto on himself, and Christmas named Mark as the replacement nominee.
655	28	"Episode 28"	Days 62–65	August 24, 2017	6.03	1.7/7
On Day 65, Mark was evicted by a 4-2 vote, with Alex and Jason voting to evict Matt. He became the third member of the Jury.
Week 9
656	29	"Episode 29"	Days 65–66	August 27, 2017	6.28	1.8/7
Head of Household ("Everyone's A Wiener"): The HouseGuests were splattered in the Everyone's A Wiener Head of Household competition. In this competition, HouseGuests must brace themselves with handholds and footholds inside their hot dog bun. The last HouseGuest standing will be the new Head of Household. Jason was the winner.; For being the first two people to drop in the Head of Household competition, Kevin and Matt became Have-Nots for the week. On Day 66, the Tree of Temptation turned red. However, nobody accepted the temptation. On Day 66, Jason nominated Matt and Raven, with Matt as the target.
657	30	"Episode 30"	Days 67–69	August 30, 2017	6.20	1.8/7
Power of Veto ("Hide and Go Veto"): On Day 67, Jason, Matt, Raven, Josh, Paul, and Kevin went on the lookout in the Hide and Go Veto Power of Veto competition. In this competition, HouseGuests had three minutes to individually hide their locked veto card in the House. Then, one at a time, HouseGuests entered the House and had one minute to attempt to find a veto card. If a HouseGuest's veto card is found, they will be eliminated, though the owner of the veto cards will not be revealed until the end of the competition. The HouseGuest who hides their veto card the best will win the Power of Veto. Jason was the winner.; On Day 69, Jason decided not to use the Power of Veto.
658	31	"Episode 31"	Days 69–72	August 31, 2017	4.91	1.5/6
On Day 71, Matt broke the Have-Not rules and earned a penalty vote on eviction night. On Day 72, Matt was evicted by a 6-0 vote. He became the fourth member of the Jury.
Week 10
659	32	"Episode 32"	Days 72–73	September 3, 2017	5.65	1.7/7
Following Matt's eviction: Julie informed the HouseGuests that the Head of Household competition would be delayed until further notice due to weather conditions.: Head of Household ("Ready, Set, Whoa"): When the delay was over, the HouseGuests sprinted in the Ready, Set, Whoa Head of Household competition. In this competition, HouseGuests had to hold down two buttons in their starting lane. At the end of their lanes, a monitor will cycle though the words "ready, set, go." If a HouseGuest releases a button before the word "go", they will be eliminated. Once they see the word "go," they must run to the end of their lane and hit one of the five buttons. The last person to hit a button will be eliminated. Once a HouseGuest uses a button, it is out of play for future rounds. The last HouseGuest standing will be the new Head of Household. Christmas was the winner.; On Day 73, Christmas nominated Alex and Jason for eviction.
660	33	"Episode 33"	Days 74–76	September 6, 2017	6.33	1.9/7
Power of Veto ("Punch Slap Kick"): Bobby Moynihan surprised the HouseGuests to host the Veto competition. On Day 74, everyone except Josh fought in the Punch Slap Kick Power of Veto competition, sponsored by the new CBS show Me, Myself & I. In this competition, HouseGuests were hit with a series of punches, slaps, and kicks. After the sequence, they were asked a question based on their experience. If they answer correctly, they will earn one point. The HouseGuest with the most points after six rounds will win the Power of Veto, as well as a visit to the set of Me, Myself & I. Alex and Paul tied the competition and then played a series of tiebreaker sequences to determine the winner. Paul was the winner.; On Day 76, Paul used the Power of Veto on Alex, and Christmas named Kevin as the replacement nominee.
661	34	"Episode 34"	Days 76–79	September 7, 2017	6.24	1.8/7
Julie informed the HouseGuests of the Double Eviction. On Day 79, after Christmas cast the tie-breaking vote, Jason was evicted by a 3-2 vote, with Alex and Paul voting to evict Kevin. He became the fifth member of the jury. Immediately after Jason's eviction: Head of Household ("Fake News"): The HouseGuests reported in the Fake News Head of Household competition. In this competition, Julie will read a series of headlines to the HouseGuests. The HouseGuests must identify if these headlines are real or fake. The HouseGuest with the most points after seven questions will be the new Head of Household. Alex was the winner.; Alex immediately nominated Kevin and Raven for eviction.: Power of Veto ("Lime Drop"): The HouseGuests then dug down deep in the Lime Drop Power of Veto competition. In this competition, HouseGuests must race down their lane, jump into their ball pit, and search for limes. They must find a lime and attempt to drop it in their tube. If a ball hits the ground, it is out of play. The first HouseGuest to drop four limes into their tube and hit their button will win the Power of Veto. Josh was the winner.; At the Veto Meeting, Josh decided not to use the Power of Veto. On Day 79, Raven was evicted by a 2-1 vote, with Josh voting to evict Kevin. She became the sixth member of the Jury. Note before the end of this episode, Julie told the viewers that even though Big brother will be back in the summer a spin off called Celebrity Big Brother will be airing in the winter
Week 11
662	35	"Episode 35"	Days 79–80	September 10, 2017	6.27	1.9/7
Following Jason and Raven's eviction: Head of Household ("The Revengers"): The HouseGuests recalled in The Revengers Head of Household competition. In this competition, HouseGuests were asked a question about the "Revengers" movie trailer that they were shown. They must find the correct character and place it in front. If they are correct, they will receive one point. The HouseGuest with the most points after seven questions will be the new Head of Household. Josh was the winner.; On Day 80, Josh nominated Alex and Kevin for eviction.
663	36	"Episode 36"	Days 80–84	September 13, 2017	6.38	1.8/7
Power of Veto ("BB Comics"): On Day 81, the HouseGuests geeked out in the BB Comics Power of Veto competition. In this competition, HouseGuests competed individually. HouseGuests must zip line by the comic studio window to look at the set of comics on the other side. They must then recreate the set of comics on their computer. However, there are several decoy comics to confuse the HouseGuests. The HouseGuest who replicates the comics on their computer the fastest will win the Power of Veto. Paul was the winner. On Day 83, Paul decided not to use the Power of Veto. On Day 84, after Josh cast the tie-breaking vote, Alex was evicted by a 2-1 vote, with Paul voting to evict Kevin. She became the seventh member of the Jury.: Head of Household ("What the Bleep?"): The HouseGuests sought a spot in the final three in the What the Bleep? Head of Household competition. In this competition, HouseGuests were shown a series of clips with a censored word or words. Julie will then give them words as to what the blurred phrase may be. The HouseGuests must then state if Julie's suggestion is true or false. A correct answer earned a HouseGuest a point. The HouseGuest with the most points after seven questions will be the new Head of Household. Paul was the winner.
664	37	"Episode 37"	Days 84–86	September 14, 2017	6.12	1.8/7
On Day 85, Paul nominated Josh and Kevin for eviction.: Power of Veto ("Back to the Veto"): On Day 85, the HouseGuests were steampunked in the Back to the Veto final Power of Veto competition. In each round of this competition, HouseGuests were asked on what day a specific event took place. They must turn their dials to match the day, then hit their button. If they are incorrect, their counter will reset to zero, and they must try again. The last HouseGuest to input the correct day will lose power in their time machine. Three strikes will result in elimination. The last HouseGuest standing will win the final Power of Veto. Paul was the winner.; On Day 86, Paul decided not to use the Power of Veto. On Day 86, Christmas cast the sole vote to evict Kevin. He became the eighth member of the Jury.
Week 12
665	38	"Episode 38"	Days 86–91; Various	September 15, 2017	4.89	1.2/6
Following Kevin's eviction: The remaining HouseGuests looked back over their time in the house.
666	39	"Episode 39"	Day 91–92	September 20, 2017	6.70	2.2/8
Head of Household – Part 1 ("Tail of the Unicorn"): The HouseGuests engaged in their final battle in the Tail of the Unicorn Part 1 of the Final Head of Household competition. In this competition, HouseGuests must stand on their cloud and hold on to the tail of their unicorn. If a HouseGuest lets go of their tail, they will be eliminated. The last HouseGuest standing will win Part 1 and advance to Part 3. Paul was the winner.; Head of Household – Part 2 ("Knock 'Em Down"): Josh and Christmas then faced off in the Knock 'Em Down Part 2 of the Final Head of Household competition. In this competition, HouseGuests were shown a series of scrolls. They must knock down the HouseGuests who do not apply to the clue. The HouseGuest who completes the three scrolls correctly faster will win Part 2 and face Paul in Part 3. Josh was the winner.; Head of Household – Part 3 ("Scales of Just-Us"): Paul and Josh had the final showdown in the Scales of Just-Us Part 3 of the Final Head of Household competition. In this competition, HouseGuests were read a series of statements from the jury. They must guess how each juror completed their statement. A correct answer gave them a point. The HouseGuest with the most points after eight questions will be the final Head of Household. Josh was the winner.; On Day 92, Josh cast the sole vote to evict Christmas. She became the ninth and final member of the Jury. On Day 92, after receiving Cody, Elena, Mark, Alex, and Jason's votes, Josh was deemed the winner of Big Brother 19. Paul was declared the runner-up, securing the votes of Matt, Raven, Kevin, and Christmas. Cody was revealed to be America's Favorite HouseGuest and received $25,000.

== Voting history ==
Color key:

Winner
Runner-up
Head of Household
Nominated for eviction
Immune from eviction
Won Immunity via competition
Not eligible to vote
Evicted
Quit
Re-entered the game

Voting history (season 19)
	Week 1		Week 2	Week 3		Week 4	Week 5	Week 6	Week 7		Week 8	Week 9	Week 10		Week 11		Week 12	
	Day 1	Day 7	Week 2	Eviction	Battleback	Week 4	Week 5	Week 6	Day 52	Day 58 (Note: This week was a double eviction week. Following the first eviction, the remaining HouseGuests played a week's worth of games, including Head of Household and veto competitions, and nomination, veto and eviction ceremonies, during the live show, culminating in a second eviction for the week.)	Week 8	Week 9	Day 73	Day 79	Day 80	Day 85	Day 92	Finale
Head of Household	(None)	Cody	Paul	Alex	(None)	Jessica	Paul	Josh	Alex	Jason	Christmas	Jason	Christmas	Alex	Josh	Paul	Josh	(None)
Temptation winner	Kevin	Paul	Christmas	Jessica	(None)	(None)	Mark	Cody	Mark	(None)	Mark	(Not taken)		(None)			(None)	(None)
Nominations (initial)	Cameron; Christmas; Jillian	Alex; Jillian; ~~Megan~~ (Note: Megan chose to quit the game. Since she had been nominated, Cody chose Alex as his replacement nominee.)	Alex; Josh; Ramses (Note: Due to Paul's temptation, Ramses was cursed with having to name himself as a third nominee within the first three weeks. He chose to nominate himself during week 2.)	Dominique; Jessica	(None)	Josh; Ramses	Cody; Jason (Note: This HouseGuest was automatically nominated for eviction after losing a temptation competition.); Jessica	Elena; Jessica; Mark	Elena; Jason; Matt	Elena; Mark	Jason; Matt	Matt; Raven	Alex; Jason	Kevin; Raven	Alex; Kevin	Josh; Kevin	(None)	(None)
Veto winner	(None)	Alex	Paul	Jason	(None)	Jessica	Paul	Mark	Matt	Mark	Jason	Jason	Paul	Josh	Paul	Paul	(None)	(None)
Nominations (final)	(None)	Christmas; Jillian; ~~Paul~~ (Note: Since Paul accepted the Pendant of Protection, he had immunity for the next three evictions. Paul chose to keep his immunity a secret until Cody attempted to nominate him for eviction at the veto ceremony in week 1.)	Alex; Cody; Ramses	Dominique; Jessica	(None)	Josh; Ramses	Cody; Jessica	Elena; Jessica; Raven	Cody; Elena; Matt	Elena; Matt	Mark; Matt	Matt; Raven	Jason; Kevin	Kevin; Raven	Alex; Kevin	Josh; Kevin	Christmas; Paul	(None)
Josh	Christmas	Jillian (Note: Josh was awarded immunity for the week after retrieving the golden apple in the Head of Household competition.)	Cody	Dominique	Paul	Nominated	No vote	Head of Household	Cody	Elena	Mark	Matt	Jason	Kevin	Alex (Note: As the vote was tied, the Head of Household cast the tie-breaker vote.)	Nominated	Christmas (Note: As Head of Household, Josh chose to evict Christmas.)	Winner
Paul	Not eligible (Note: When Paul entered the game, he was granted immunity from the first eviction. He had to grant immunity to eight other HouseGuests; he chose Kevin, Raven, Dominique, Mark, Jason, Jessica, Ramses, and Elena.)	Jillian	Head of Household	Dominique	Alex	Ramses	Head of Household	Jessica	Cody	Elena	Mark (Note: Mark earned the power to "save a friend," which allowed him to grant immunity to another HouseGuest; he chose Paul.)	Matt	Kevin	Raven	Kevin	Head of Household	Nominated	Runner-up
Christmas	Nominated	Nominated	Ramses	Dominique	Paul	Ramses	No vote	Jessica	Cody	Elena	Head of Household	Matt	Jason	Raven	Alex	Kevin	Evicted (Day 92)	Paul
Kevin	Cameron	Jillian	Ramses	Dominique	Paul	Ramses	No vote	Jessica	Cody	Elena	Mark	Matt	Nominated	Nominated	Nominated	Nominated	Evicted (Day 86)	Paul
Alex	Cameron	Christmas	Nominated	Head of Household	Paul	Ramses	No vote	Jessica	Head of Household	Elena	Matt	Matt	Kevin	Head of Household	Nominated	Evicted (Day 84)		Josh
Raven	Cameron	Jillian	Cody	Dominique	Paul	Ramses	No vote	Nominated	Cody	Elena	Mark	Nominated	Jason	Nominated	Evicted (Day 79)			Paul
Jason	Christmas	Christmas	Cody	Dominique	Paul	Ramses	No vote	Jessica	Cody	Head of Household	Matt	Head of Household	Nominated	Evicted (Day 79)				Josh
Matt	Jillian	Jillian	Cody	Dominique	Paul	Ramses	No vote	Jessica	Nominated	Nominated	Nominated	Nominated	Evicted (Day 72)					Paul
Mark	Jillian	Jillian	Cody	Dominique	Paul	Josh	No vote (Note: This player received immunity by winning a temptation competition.)	Jessica	Cody	Matt	Nominated	Evicted (Day 65)						Josh
Elena	Cameron	Jillian	Cody	Dominique	Paul	Josh	No vote	Nominated	Nominated	Nominated	Evicted (Day 58)							Josh
Cody	Jillian	Head of Household	Nominated	Evicted (Day 23)		Josh	Nominated	Raven	Nominated	Re-evicted (Day 58)								Josh
Jessica	Cameron	Christmas	Ramses	Nominated	Paul	Head of Household	Nominated	Nominated	Evicted (Day 51)									
Ramses	Cameron	Christmas	Nominated	Dominique	Paul	Nominated	Evicted (Day 37)											
Dominique	Cameron	Jillian	Cody	Nominated	Evicted (Day 30)													
Jillian	Nominated	Nominated	Evicted (Day 16)															
Megan	Cameron	Walked (Day 8)																
Cameron	Nominated	Evicted (Day 1)																
Evicted	Cameron; 8 of 13 votes to evict	Jillian; 8 of 12 votes to evict	Cody; 7 of 10 votes to evict	Dominique; 10 of 10 votes to evict	Paul; 11 of 12 votes to compete (Note: Cameron, Jillian, Cody, and Dominique competed for an opportunity to re-enter the game. The four faced off in a duels. Cody won the elimination duels and had to face off against a challenger selected by the HouseGuests still in the game in order to win re-entry to the house. Paul was voted the challenger in a 11–1 vote. Cody won the final duel and re-entered the house.)	Ramses; 7 of 10 votes to evict	Eviction cancelled (Note: On Day 44, Jessica used the halting hex, which cancelled this week's eviction.)	Jessica; 7 of 8 votes to evict	Cody; 7 of 7 votes to evict	Elena; 6 of 7 votes to evict	Mark; 4 of 6 votes to evict	Matt; 6 of 6 votes to evict (Note: Matt was given a penalty vote for eviction after eating normal food while on a mandatory have-not diet.)	Jason; 3 of 5 votes to evict	Raven; 2 of 3 votes to evict	Alex; 2 of 3 votes to evict	Kevin; Christmas' choice to evict	Christmas; Josh's choice to evict	Josh; 5 votes to win
Evicted	Cameron; 8 of 13 votes to evict	Jillian; 8 of 12 votes to evict	Cody; 7 of 10 votes to evict	Dominique; 10 of 10 votes to evict	Cody; Won re-entry into game	Ramses; 7 of 10 votes to evict	Eviction cancelled	Jessica; 7 of 8 votes to evict	Cody; 7 of 7 votes to evict	Elena; 6 of 7 votes to evict	Mark; 4 of 6 votes to evict	Matt; 6 of 6 votes to evict	Jason; 3 of 5 votes to evict	Raven; 2 of 3 votes to evict	Alex; 2 of 3 votes to evict	Kevin; Christmas' choice to evict	Christmas; Josh's choice to evict	Paul; 4 votes to win

== Production ==
=== Development ===
Big Brother 19 was produced by Endemol Shine North America and Fly on the Wall Entertainment with Allison Grodner and Rich Meehan returning as executive producers. This season of the program has been confirmed since August 10, 2016 as part of a multi season renewal between Endemol Shine North America and CBS which also includes its twentieth season scheduled for the summer of 2018. Julie Chen returned as the host of the series.

=== Broadcasts ===
The main television coverage of the season was screened on CBS beginning June 28, 2017 with a two-hour season premiere. This season featured no changes to the schedule that was used in the previous edition, with episodes airing on Wednesday, Thursday, and Sunday each week. The weekly Thursday episode, which airs at 6 PM. PDT, featured the live eviction and subsequent Head of Household competition taking place. During the live eviction, the show will be hosted by Julie Chen. The weekly Sunday episode, which airs at 5 PM PDT, features the nomination ceremony, as well as some highlights from the previous days. The weekly Wednesday episode, which also airs at 5 PM PDT, features the Power of Veto competition and the Power of Veto ceremony, along with more highlights of recent events in the House. The live Internet feeds which have been a staple of the program since its first season will return as part of CBS All Access. Alongside the weekly shows on CBS spin-off series Big Brother: After Dark will return on Pop for its twelfth season. The show serves as a live feed into the House, and is edited for profanity, nudity, slanderous statements and music copyrights.

A special episode was aired on July 21 to show the "Battle Back Showdown" where one of the 4 first evicted House Guests competed to re-enter the Big Brother House.

=== Prizes ===
The House Guests will be competing for the main prize of $500,000. Cash prizes of varying amounts may be offered as "temptations" over the course of the season. Kevin Schlehuber was awarded $25,000 on the premiere episode. The second cash temptation of the season was also claimed by Kevin; this time, it was a smaller sum of $27.

The fan-favorite poll, America's Favorite HouseGuest was awarded Cody Nickson with $25,000 during the finale. While HouseGuests are eligible to win the award, only Megan Lowder was not eligible due to her withdrawal on Day 8.

== Reception ==
=== Critical response ===
The season received negative reviews from critics and audiences.

Entertainment Weekly named Season 19 as Big Brother's worst season, calling the season "a long, boring slog that was only interrupted by bouts of bullying and cringe-worthy comments poking fun at rape, race, and the trans community." Christine Persuad from Collider ranked the season third in its list of "Big Brother's 10 Worst Seasons", saying the season "left much to be desired" and that it was "uncomfortably tense."

=== Criticism and controversy ===
Paul Abrahamian received criticism for their controversial mimicking of another HouseGuest. In Week 3, they targeted Dominique Cooper for eviction and decided to apply black facial cosmetics and clothing that resembled the skin of a snake, in regards to a metaphor that she had used in an effort to expose their strategy to other HouseGuests. Given that Cooper is African American, Abrahamian's actions were deemed racist when they referred to the cosmetics as "blackface."

Viewers also debated on Abrahamian's alleged bullying tactics in which they encouraged other HouseGuests to antagonize "outcasts" in the House, especially showmance allies Jessica Graf and Cody Nickson. Some notable incidents include Christmas Abbott propagating aspersions on Nickson's military service, and Alex Ow and Raven Walton engaging in verbal arguments with Graf. Likewise, a physical confrontation nearly transpired between Josh Martinez and Mark Jansen (who defended Nickson), as Martinez was agitating Jansen by banging pots and pans in his face. Another fistfight almost ensued between Abrahamian and Nickson after Abrahamian silenced Graf in front of Nickson in the HoH Room. Abrahamian, who was HoH at that time, bypassed the confrontation instead by sending Nickson out of the room while screaming condescensions at him.

Some fans also perceived Megan Lowder's voluntary exit on Day 8 as a result of bullying. During a backyard conversation, Lowder believed that she overheard Graf refer to Ow as a panda, which Lowder considered to be racist due to its Asian connotation. However, Graf actually said "Pao Pao", which alluded to the nickname of Big Brother 16 HouseGuest Paola Shea, of whom Ow reminded Graf due to them both being Asian Americans. After being informed of the comment by Lowder, Ow clarified the issue with Graf, but they both later assumed that Lowder had fabricated the comment for game-related purposes, prompting them to confront her. Lowder felt overwhelmed by the confrontation and retreated to the Diary Room where she brought up her history of posttraumatic stress disorder with the show's producers. Concerned of her mental health, Lowder decided that it would be best for her to withdraw from the game.

Viewers called for Jason Dent's expulsion from the House after he was caught on the live feeds making rape and assault jokes in front of other HouseGuests. In one instance, Dent commented on having sex with Kevin Schlehuber's wife, Deborah, while all their daughters would be tied up and forced to watch the act. In an interview with TMZ, Deborah said that Dent's comments were disturbing and "the worst thing she's ever seen." On Twitter, Dent's family apologized for the comments but stated that they were taken out of context, which Deborah doubted as she believed her husband would never joke as such about anyone in any situation. Dent also made similar jokes earlier in the competition, such as suggesting to restrain contestant Raven Walton and have male HouseGuests "take turns" on her, and once telling cops about sexually assaulting women at a nursing home.

Jason Dent and Cody Nickson sparked backlash after footage of remarks regarded as transphobic was depicted on the live feeds. During a conversation in the hot tub, Graf informed Dent and Nickson about Audrey Middleton of Big Brother 17 as the first transgender contestant in the show's history. Nickson proceeded to mock the gender identity of Middleton, for whom Dent was also confused about the appropriate pronoun. Middleton addressed the controversy through a Twitter post, urging people not to vilify both male HouseGuests but rather, educate them on the value of emotional intelligence. Nickson was also criticized for using the derogatory term "tranny" several times earlier in the game.

The extent of Raven Walton's lies in the House became a heavily contested debate among fans throughout the season. She often spoke about suffering from gastroparesis (GP), on which she made several inaccurate or false statements, including its hereditary nature, sterility effect, and terminal prognosis. Even before joining the show, Walton had established a GoFundMe campaign for her treatments, which many skeptical fans considered a scam. Schlehuber also recounted Walton asking viewers for money on camera. Other GP sufferers and organizations like Gastroparesis Patient Association for Cures and Treatment disputed her claims about the severity of her disease, while a plethora of fans condemned them as malingering. However, Walton's mother and her physician took it to social media to combat Walton's critics. Walton also claimed that she and her mother were members of Mensa but their names were disproven to be found in the organization's current directory.

Several House Guests, especially Graf, attracted controversy for certain inappropriate acts in the House. Footage on the live feeds showed Graf making contact with some House Guests in their "private areas" in a joking manner without prior consent. When confronted, Graf dismissed any accusations of such wrongdoing as sexual harassment or invasion of privacy. Ironically, Graf's behavior incited other House Guests like Abrahamian, Matthew Clines, Ramses Soto, and Elena Davies to partake in similar playful acts towards House Guests of the same and opposite genders. In one episode of the show, Ow shared with Martinez how the rampant "touching" in the House, particularly her experience with Graf, made her uncomfortable because it was reminiscent of her cousin who had been raped and murdered.

=== Viewing figures ===
#	Air Date	United States				Source
#	Air Date	18–49 (rating/share)	Viewers (millions)	Rank (timeslot)	Rank (night)	Source
1	Wednesday, June 28, 2017	1.7/7	5.88	1	1	
2	Thursday, June 29, 2017	1.6/7	5.37	1	1	
3	Sunday, July 2, 2017	1.4/7	5.16	1	1	
4	Wednesday, July 5, 2017	1.8/8	6.15	1	1	
5	Thursday, July 6, 2017	1.9/8	6.09	1	1	
6	Sunday, July 9, 2017	1.8/8	6.39	1	1	
7	Wednesday, July 12, 2017	1.9/9	6.45	1	1	
8	Thursday, July 13, 2017	1.8/8	6.11	1	1	
9	Sunday, July 16, 2017	1.8/8	5.95	1	1	
10	Wednesday, July 19, 2017	1.9/8	6.19	1	1	
11	Thursday, July 20, 2017	1.9/7	5.96	1	1	
12	Friday, July 21, 2017	1.5/7	5.45	1	1	
13	Sunday, July 23, 2017	1.8/7	5.98	1	1	
14	Wednesday, July 26, 2017	1.8/8	6.35	1	1	
15	Thursday, July 27, 2017	1.9/8	6.33	1	1	
16	Sunday, July 30, 2017	1.9/8	6.33	1	1	
17	Wednesday, August 2, 2017	1.9/8	6.57	1	1	
18	Thursday, August 3, 2017	1.9/8	6.42	1	2	
19	Sunday, August 6, 2017	2.0/8	6.46	1	1	
20	Wednesday, August 9, 2017	1.9/8	6.39	1	1	
21	Thursday, August 10, 2017	1.9/8	5.95	1	1	
22^{1}	Sunday, August 13, 2017	1.9/8	6.22	1	1	
23	Wednesday, August 16, 2017	1.9/8	6.27	2	2	
24	Thursday, August 17, 2017	2.1/8	6.48	1	1	
25	Friday, August 18, 2017	1.4/7	5.06	1	1	
26	Sunday, August 20, 2017	1.8/7	6.42	1	1	
27	Wednesday, August 23, 2017	1.8/7	6.10	2	2	
28	Thursday, August 24, 2017	1.7/7	6.03	1	1	
29	Sunday, August 27, 2017	1.8/7	6.28	2	2	
30	Wednesday, August 30, 2017	1.8/7	6.20	2	2	
31	Thursday, August 31, 2017	1.5/6	4.91	1	1	
32	Sunday, September 3, 2017	1.7/7	5.65	1	1	
33	Wednesday, September 6, 2017	1.9/7	6.33	2	2	
34	Thursday, September 7, 2017	1.8/7	6.24	1	3	
35	Sunday, September 10, 2017	1.9/7	6.27	2	6	
36	Wednesday, September 13, 2017	1.8/7	6.38	2	2	
37	Thursday, September 14, 2017	1.8/7	6.12	1	1	
38	Friday, September 15, 2017	1.2/6	4.89	1	1	
39	Wednesday, September 20, 2017	2.2/8	6.70	2	2	

- ^Note 1: Episode 22 was delayed to 8:18 PM ET (7:18 PM CT) due to the PGA Tour golf event running long.
