= MOS 0311 =

Infantry rifleman in the U.S. Marine Corps

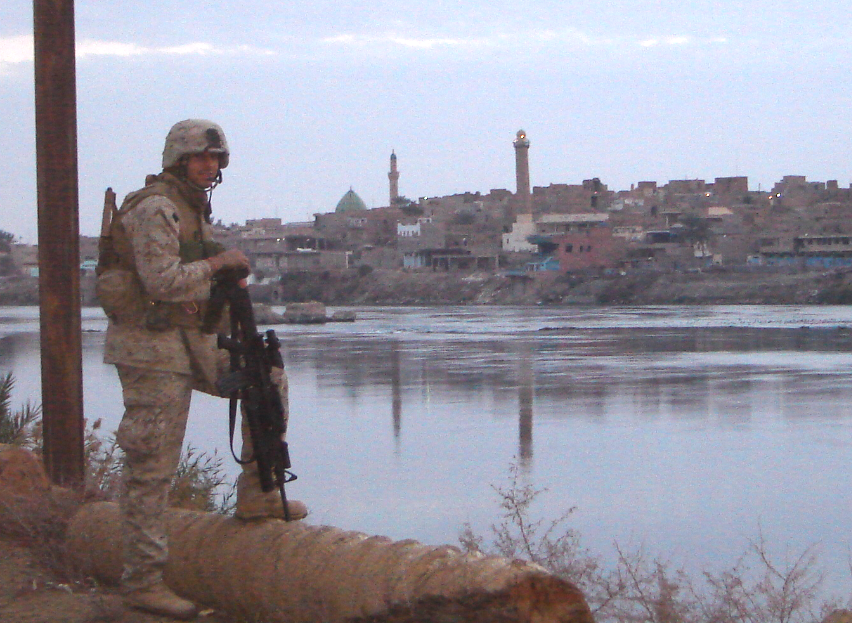
A U.S. Marine Infantryman (0311) with 1/2 Bravo Company patrols alongside the Euphrates River in Hīt, Iraq, 2005.

MOS 0311 is the United States Marine Corps (USMC) Military Occupational Specialty (MOS) code for infantry rifleman. It is the primary infantry MOS for enlisted Marines.

== General information ==
A rifleman may employ the M4 carbine, the M203 grenade launcher, the M27 Infantry Automatic Rifle, AT4 and M72 LAW rockets. Riflemen are the primary scouts, assault troops, and close combat forces available to the Marine Air Ground Task Force. They are the foundation of the Marine infantry organization, and as such are the nucleus of the fire team in the rifle squad, the scout team in the LAR squad, scout snipers in the infantry battalion, and reconnaissance or assault team in the reconnaissance units. Noncommissioned officers are assigned as fire team leaders, scout team leaders, rifle squad leaders, or rifle platoon guides. The mission of the Marine Corps rifle squad is to locate, close with and destroy the enemy by fire and maneuver or to repel the enemy's assault by fire and close combat.

== Training ==
Training for this MOS is conducted at the United States Marine Corps School of Infantry located at Camp Geiger, North Carolina or Camp Pendleton, California. The training period is 59 days.

== See also ==
- MOS 0369 Infantry Unit Leader
