= Rifleman =

Infantry soldier armed with a rifle

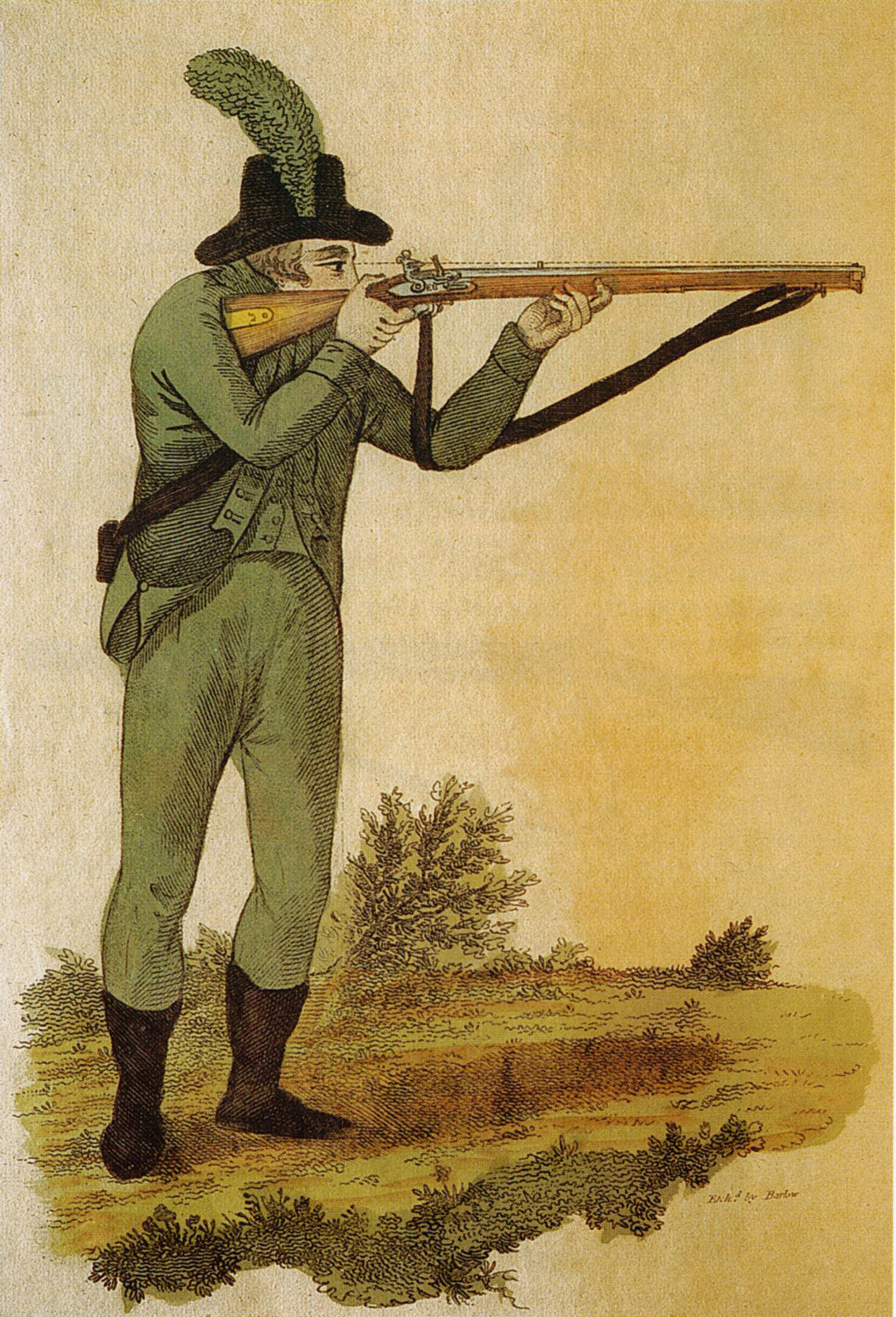
c. 1803 engraving of a British rifleman using the Baker rifle

A rifleman is an infantry soldier armed with a rifled long gun. Although the rifleman role had its origin with 16th century hand cannoneers and 17th century musketeers, the term originated in the 18th century with the introduction of the rifled musket. By the mid-19th century, entire regiments of riflemen were formed and became the mainstay of all standard infantry, and as rifles became standard infantry weapons, the earlier distinction between specialist riflemen and ordinary line infantry largely disappeared. In modern usage, rifleman can denote a basic infantry soldier, a specific billet or military occupational specialty, or in some armies, the equivalent of the rank of private.

== History ==
Units of musketeers were originally developed to support units of pikemen. As firearms became more effective and widely used, the composition of these pike-and-musket units changed, with pikemen eventually becoming support units to the musketeers, particularly against cavalry. The last pike regiments were dissolved by the 1720s, as pikes were superseded by the invention of the bayonet. This converted the musket into a pike for those situations where it might still be useful, such as following up volleys with a charge, crowd control, or defensive formations.

Smooth-bore weapons, such as the musket, had always been recognized as relatively inaccurate, especially at longer ranges, and required massed volleys to be combat-effective. Although the smoothbore barrels impeded the accuracy of a musket, it was an advantage when loading because the looser fitting musket ball slid down the barrel quickly and easily with the ramrod being used mainly to compress the powder charge at the base of the barrel. Rifles required a tighter fit and thus more work to get the ball to be rammed all the way down the barrel. This meant that the soldiers chosen for this role needed to be good shots, resilient, brave, and resourceful. Riflemen were trained to act in isolation and were dispersed in teams of two, defending each other while they re-loaded. They were still vulnerable, especially to cavalry, as they could not present the solid wall of bayonets a larger mass of soldiers could. These factors: the time and expense required in training, the limited number of suitable recruits, and the specialized roles and situations where they were most effective meant they were highly prized, given special privileges, and used sparingly rather than squandered.

Such rifle units reached their heyday in the period shortly before and during the Napoleonic Wars, with the British riflemen partially derived from units of colonial militia (see Rogers' Rangers or the Royal Americans) — truly excelling in the American War of Independence. Regular units of rifles formed in the British Army in 1800 were the 60th Regiment of Foot and the 95th Regiment of Foot. These units were often given the name "light infantry", emphasizing their specialized roles.

Starting in the 1840s, with the advent of the Minié ball and the first military breech-loading rifles, the rifles entered the age of industrialized warfare. It was mass-produced and accessible to all infantrymen. The high level of training and specialized roles gave way to generality: the rifles were much faster and simpler to load, able to be reloaded while prone, and impossible to be double-loaded after a misfire. The term 'rifleman', once used solely as a mark of distinction and pride, became a commonplace description of all infantry, no matter what their actual status was. Nevertheless, the term retained a certain élan that is still found today.

== Rank ==
In many (particularly Commonwealth) armies, "rifleman" is a rank equivalent to private, abbreviated Rfn.

== Rifleman in different countries ==
=== Australia ===
Riflemen are employed by the Australian Army in both the Regular Army and the Army Reserve. Riflemen in the Australian Army are members of the Royal Australian Infantry Corps. Riflemen in the Regular Army are organised into seven battalions of the Royal Australian Regiment.

The 7 battalions are composed of:

- 1st Battalion (1 RAR)
- 2nd Battalion (2 RAR)
- 3rd Battalion (3 RAR)
- 5th Battalion (5 RAR)
- 6th Battalion (6 RAR)
- 7th Battalion (7 RAR)
- 8th/9th Battalion (8/9 RAR).

Riflemen of the Army Reserve are organised into individual state and university regiments with reserve depots being found in many places throughout rural and metropolitan Australia.

=== Israel ===
In the Israel Defense Forces every soldier goes through some basic infantry training called Tironut. However, the level of training changes according to the role and unit to which the soldier belongs. The Rifleman profession (in Hebrew: רובאי) includes basic military skills, physical training, military discipline, and use of the assault rifle. More infantry skills (such as operating diverse weapons) are added as the level of training increases.

Basic training (Tironut):

- Non-combat soldiers are trained as Rifleman 02.
- Combat-support troops are trained as Rifleman 03.
- Combat Engineering soldiers, Field Intelligence Corps soldiers, Border Guard policemen and infantry soldiers are trained as Rifleman 05.

Advanced training (Imun Mitkadem):

- Combat soldiers of Artillery Corps are trained as Rifleman 03.
- Specialized Combat Soldiers of the Artillery corps are trained as Rifleman 04.
- Combat soldiers of Armor corps are trained as Rifleman 04.
- mounted Field Intelligence Corps soldiers are trained as Recon Rifleman 05.
- infantry Field Intelligence Corps soldiers are trained as Recon Rifleman 07.
- Combat Engineering sappers are trained as Rifleman 07.
- Infantry soldiers are trained as Rifleman 07.

Additional training for combat soldiers:

- Combat squad commanders are trained as Rifleman 08.
- Combat Senior Sergeants are trained as Rifleman 10.
- Combat officers are trained as Rifleman 12.

=== Rhodesia ===
The Rhodesia Regiment had an affiliation with the King's Royal Rifle Corps since World War I. The regiment's badge was the Maltese Cross, the colours were red, black and rifle green and rifle green berets were worn. A private soldier had the title of Rifleman.

=== United Kingdom ===
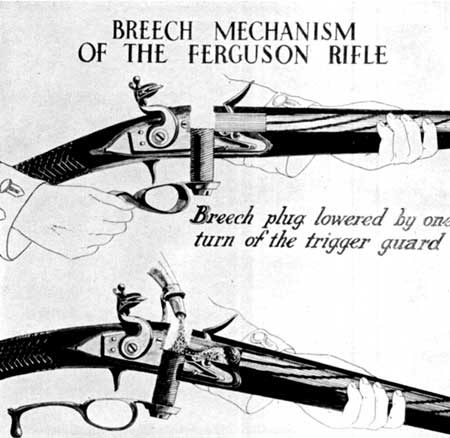
British Army manual for the Ferguson rifle

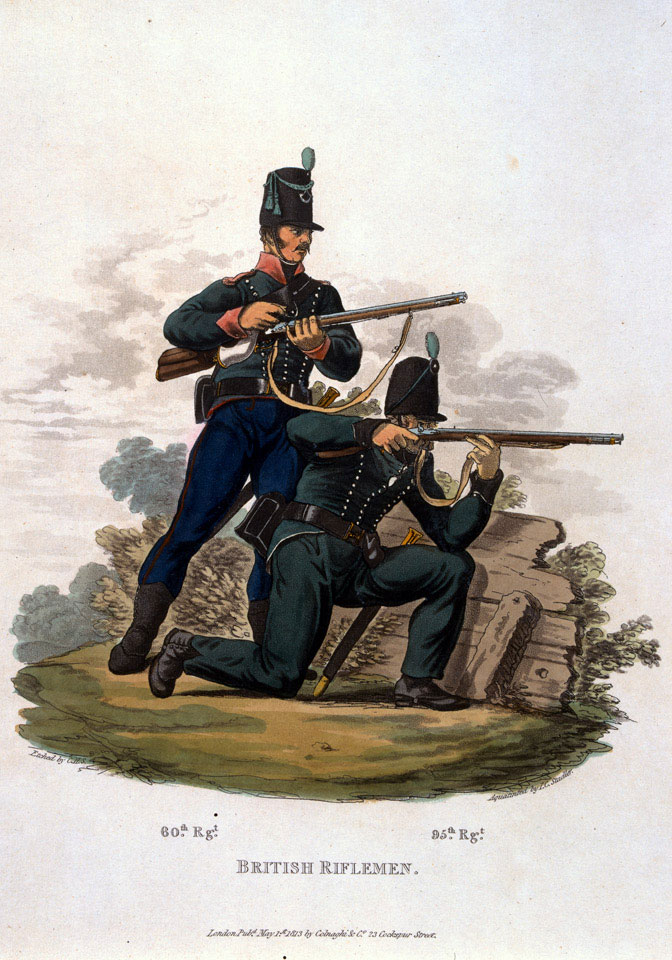
1812 engraving of riflemen of the 60th Foot (left) and 95th Rifles (right)

A soldier of The Rifles in the Castlemartin Training Area, December 2021

From their inception British Rifle Regiments were distinguished by a dark green dress with blackened buttons, black leather equipment, and sombre facing colours designed for concealment. This has been retained to the present day for those British units that still carry on the traditions of the riflemen. Their most famous weapon was the Baker rifle (officially known as the Pattern 1800 Infantry Rifle), which in the hands of the elite 95th regiment and the light companies of the 60th regiment and the Kings German Legion gained fame in the Peninsular War against Napoleonic France.

- 60th rifles/King's Royal Rifle Corps
- 95th Rifles/The Rifle Brigade
- Royal Ulster Rifles
- Royal Green Jackets
- The Rifles
- Royal Gurkha Rifles
- Cameronians (Scottish Rifles)

During the Siege of Delhi the 8th (Sirmoor) Local Battalion along with the 60th Rifles defended Hindu Rao's House during which a strong bond developed. After the rebellion, the 60th Rifles pressed for the Sirmoor Battalion to become a rifle regiment. This honour was granted to them the following year (1858) when the Battalion was renamed the Sirmoor Rifle Regiment. Later all British Army Gurkha regiments were designated rifle regiments a nomenclature maintained to this day with the Royal Gurkha Rifles.

The rank of Rifleman instead of Private was officially introduced in 1923.

The British military had, from the union of the Kingdom of England and the Kingdom of Scotland to form the Kingdom of Great Britain in 1707 until the end of the Napoleonic Wars, included a standing army (the "Regular Army") and the Board of Ordnance, a more ancient part-time, conscripted Militia, the part-time Yeomanry cavalry, and various short-lived volunteer and fencible units formed for the duration of emergencies. In the 1850s, the Militia was re-organised into a voluntarily-recruited force that, like the army, enlisted recruits for fixed terms of service.

Concerns over the vulnerability of Britain to attack by a continental power, especially with much of the Regular Army garrisoning the Empire, also led to the creation of a permanent Volunteer Force. Although this would include various types of units, the majority were company-sized Volunteer Rifle Corps, dressed in rifle-green or grey uniforms and trained as skirmishers to support the line infantry of the regular army or to act independently to harry enemy forces.

Successive reforms saw the smaller corps grouped into battalions with neighbouring corps, then most lost their identities when they became volunteer battalions of new county regiments 1881. These regiments typically contained two regular battalions, which had previously been separate single battalion regiments, as the first and second battalions, sharing a depot, with militia and volunteer units in the same county becoming additionally numbered battalions. As the majority of these new regiments were formed from regular line infantry and most of the volunteer rifle corps linked with them would lose their identity as rifle units. Examples included the Robin Hood Rifles, which was to become the 7th (Robin Hood) Battalion, Sherwood Foresters (Nottinghamshire and Derbyshire Regiment). The rifles identity was not always lost despite becoming part of a line infantry regiment.

The 5th Lancashire Rifle Volunteer Corps, became part of the 2nd Administrative Battalion Lancashire Rifle Volunteers, which became the 5th (Liverpool Rifle Brigade) Rifle Volunteer Corps, the 2nd Volunteer Battalion of the King's Regiment (Liverpool), and then the 6th Battalion (Rifles) King's Regiment (Liverpool). In 1936, the battalion was retrained to operate searchlights and redesignated the 38th (The King's Regiment) Anti-Aircraft Battalion, Royal Engineers (Territorial Army), and in 1940 it was renamed the 38th (The Kings Regiment) Searchlight Regiment, Royal Artillery (Territorial Army). Despite the change of parent corps, the battalion wore 'Liverpool Rifles' shoulder titles with red lettering on a Rifle green backgrounds.

Other volunteer rifle corps retained their independence and their identities through the various re-organisations of the latter 19th and earlier 20th Centuries, such as the Artists Rifles. Twenty-six former volunteer rifle corps in London on the formation of the Territorial Force (merging Militia, Yeomanry and Volunteer Force) in 1908 became battalions of the new London Regiment, with each retaining its own distinctive rifle green or grey uniform. Colonial military establishments often lagged behind re-organisations in Britain or followed different paths of re-organisation. Examples include the Bermuda Volunteer Rifle Corps, which was not re-organised as a territorial until 1921, but remained an independent corps and retained the same name until being re-designated the Bermuda Rifles in 1949 (it lost its rifles identity when amalgamated into the Royal Bermuda Regiment in 1965) and the Hong Kong Artillery and Rifle Volunteer Corps, re-named the Hong Kong Defence Corps by 1917.

=== United States ===
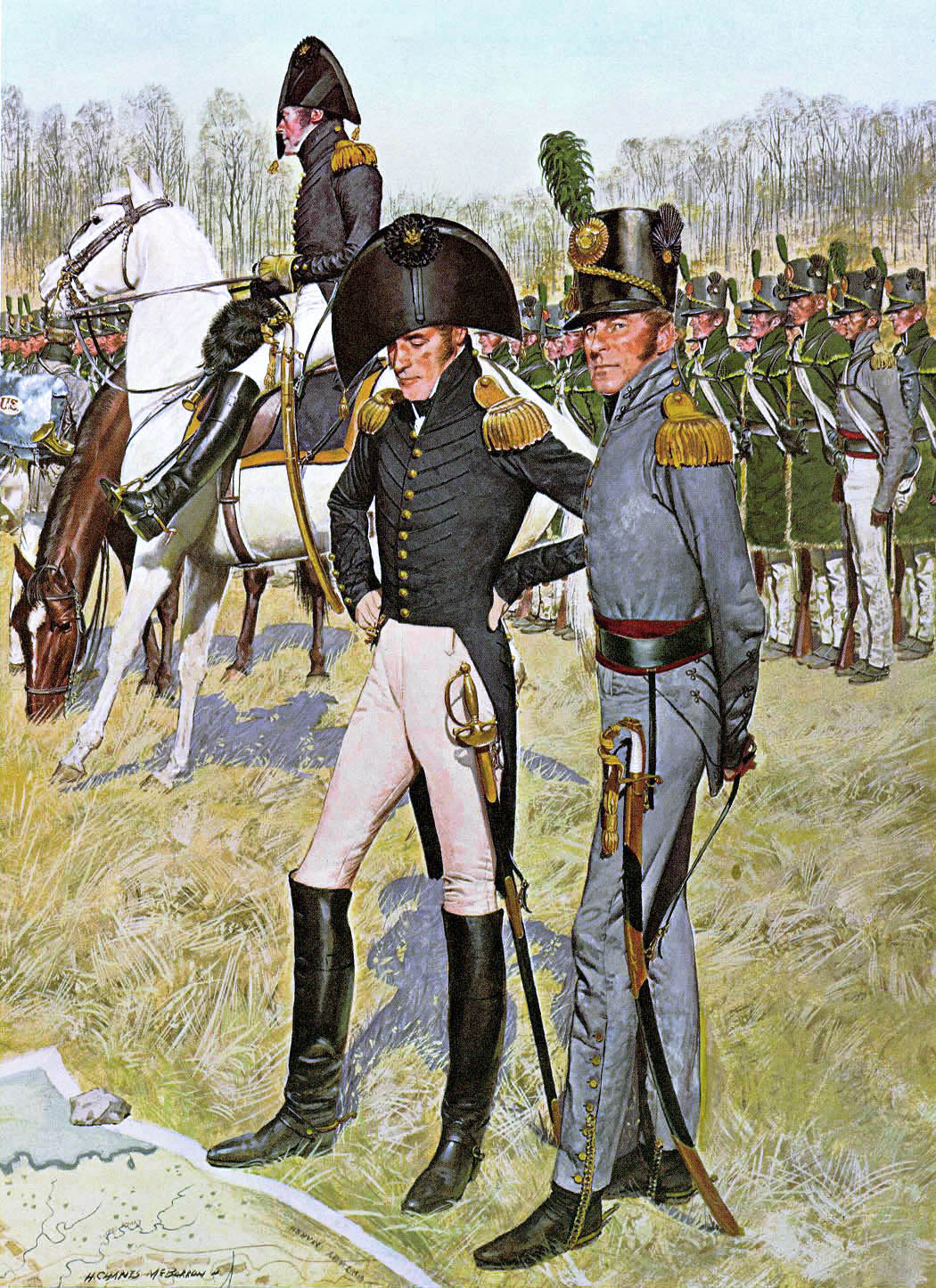
Troops of the Regiment of Riflemen in 1814

In 1808, the United States Army created its first Regiment of Riflemen. During the War of 1812 three more Rifle Regiments were raised but disbanded after the war. The Rifle Regiment was disbanded in 1821.

In the Mexican–American War Colonel Jefferson Davis created and led the Mississippi Rifles.

Riflemen were listed as separate to infantry up to the American Civil War.

During the Civil War, Sharpshooter regiments were raised in the North with several companies being raised by individual states for their own regiments.

In the United States Marine Corps, the Military Occupational Specialty (MOS) 0311 is for Rifleman. It is the primary infantry MOS for the Marine Corps, equivalent to the U.S. Army MOS 11B for Infantryman.

== See also ==
- Chasseur
- Jäger
- Light infantry
- Schützen
- Skirmisher
- Tirailleur
- Voltigeur
