= MOS 0369 =

MOS 0369 is the United States Marine Corps (USMC) Military Occupational Specialty (MOS) for Infantry Unit Leader.

== General information ==
The infantry unit leader is a staff non-commissioned officer with the rank of staff sergeant through master gunnery sergeant (specifically excluding first sergeants and sergeants major) who assists commanders and operations officers in the training, deployment and tactical employment of rifle, reconnaissance, direct action, weapons, Light Armored Reconnaissance (LAR), and antitank platoons/companies and infantry, and LAR battalions, and are proficient in all the infantry weapons systems.

They are usually career infantry men rising from the ranks of the enlisted infantry MOSs. A sergeant of other Marine MOSs may laterally transfer and be trained as one of the basic 03 Infantry MOSs before promotion to 0369, but they may not laterally move into this MOS as a staff non-commissioned officer. By virtue of their MOS experience, deployments, and longevity, they supervise and coordinate the preparation of personnel, weapons and equipment for movement and combat, the establishment and operation of unit command posts, the fire and movement between tactical units, the fire of supporting arms, and the unit resupply and casualty evacuation effort.

As a platoon sergeant in the rifle, surveillance and target acquisition, reconnaissance, direct action, weapons, machine-gun, LAR, and antitank platoons, he advises the platoon commander on all issues of discipline, morale and welfare. He also serves as the section leader for the scout-sniper and various weapons sections and often leads task organized patrols and teams. They are trained and prepared to assume command of the platoon or unit should the need arise.

In a rifle company, a staff sergeant with the military occupational specialty of 0369 may serve as a machine gun or mortar section leader in a weapons platoon, or a platoon sergeant for a rifle platoon. In a weapons company, a staff sergeant may serve as a section leader for a Combined Anti-Armor Team, or as a section leader in a heavy machine gun platoon, 81mm mortar platoon or anti-armor platoon.

An infantry gunnery sergeant may serve as a weapons platoon sergeant or as the Company Gunnery Sergeant for a rifle company. Additionally, gunnery sergeants are platoon sergeants for the Combined Anti-Armor Team, heavy machinegun platoon, or anti-armor platoon.

Master sergeants in this Military Occupational Specialty serve in the weapons company as the Company Operations Chief, or in the battalion operations section (S-3).

An infantry master gunnery sergeant serves as the unit Operations Chief for an infantry battalion or higher (regiment, division, etc.)
