= United States military occupation code =

Code used in the U.S. Army and Marine Corps to identify a specific job

A United States military occupation code, or a military occupational specialty code (MOS code), is a nine-character code used in the United States Army and United States Marine Corps to identify a specific job. In the United States Air Force, a system of Air Force Specialty Codes (AFSC) is used. In the United States Navy, a system of naval ratings and designators are used along with the Navy Enlisted Classification (NEC) system. A system of ratings is also used in the United States Coast Guard.

Since an individual can obtain multiple job specialties, a duty military occupational specialty (DMOS) is used to identify what their primary job function is at any given time. An individual must complete and pass all required training for their military occupational specialty qualification (MOSQ).

== Army ==
=== World War Two (1942–1946) ===
Originally, the four-digit MOS code mostly listed the recruit's civilian profession. This was to aid in classifying what military job they could be assigned. With so many recruits being processed, identifying any semi-skilled or skilled civilian tradesmen made it easier to match them with the right military job. There was an additional list of military trades and trainings added so a trained soldier could be assigned to the right unit. There were no grouping of similar trades together, making it hard for someone to know the meaning of an MOS code without a manual.

=== Post-War reform ===
The MOS system now had five digits, with a period after the third digit. The first four-digit code number indicated the soldier's job; the first two digits were the field code, the third digit was the sub-specialty and the fourth code number (separated by a period) was the job title. A fifth code digit was for the soldier's special qualification identifier (SQI) digit, which indicated what specialized training the soldier had. If the soldier did not have an SQI, the digit was listed as "0" or was omitted. The codes for the civilian trades were removed as unnecessary.

Examples
11 (One-one) is the field code for infantry, 1.1 is the sub-specialty of light weapons, and 7 is the SQI for airborne training. Therefore, 111.10 is the MOS for an infantryman and 111.17 is for an airborne-qualified paratrooper.
91 (Nine-one) was the old field code for the medical field, 912.0 was the MOS for medical NCO and 912.00 was a generalist medical NCO with no SQI.

=== 1964 reform ===
In 1964 the system was revamped. There were completely different codes for enlisted / non-commissioned officers, warrant officers, and commissioned officers.

Enlisted and NCO personnel had a five-symbol code. The first four code symbols were made up of a two-digit code for the career field, a letter code for the field specialty, and a number code (1 to 5) indicating level of instruction in their field specialty. The fifth code symbol was an SQI code letter indicating training in a special skill (the letter "O" indicating that the soldier had no SQI). An exception to the 5-symbol rule was made for an SQI which indicated language fluency. In this case, 7 symbols were used, with "L" as the language qualification indicator, followed by two characters indicating the specific language.

Warrant officers also had a five-symbol code but it was different. The first three numbers were the career field, then a letter code for the field specialty, and ended in the SQI code letter.

Officers had a four-digit code number for their career field and specialty. Officers with a special qualification also had an SQI code number prefix to their MOS rather than a code letter suffix. Officers without a special qualification had no prefix number.

=== 1983 reform ===
In 1983, there was a reform of this system. Some of the field code numbers were changed and the MOS codes were streamlined.

Warrant officers and officers received the same career field codes as enlisted and NCO personnel and ended in the same SQI letter codes. Warrant officers received a five-symbol MOS consisting of a four-symbol field specialty code consisting of the two-digit field code, a one-digit sub-field code number (usually "0"), the field specialty code letter, and followed by the SQI code letter. Officers now had a four-symbol alphanumeric MOS. It consisted of the three-symbol field specialty code of two numbers and a specialty code letter and ended in the SQI letter code.

The field code "18" was created for US Army Special Forces, which are now considered part of the regular US Army. Previously they had been considered a layer between the intelligence services and the army. The 18A was for special forces officers and 180A was for special forces warrant officers. The 18X was for special forces candidates who had not yet passed the "Q" course. The "A" team leaders had to be captains instead of lieutenants and were rotated to conventional postings.

Certain field specialty code letters were reserved. The "X" was for recruits or candidates who have pre-selected a career field but had not graduated from AIT. The "Z" is for senior NCOs of E8 or E9 grade. The "A" is for officers and warrant officers in a general capacity. Specialist officers and warrant officers have other field code letters reserved for them.

=== Current version ===
The list of US Army military occupational specialty codes is published on the United States Army Human Resources Command (HRC) PAMXXI website.

=== Enlisted personnel ===
The MOS code (MOSC), consisting of nine characters, provides more information than a soldier's MOS. It is used by automated management systems and reports. The MOSC is used with active and reserve records, reports, authorization documents, and other personnel management systems.

The elements of the MOSC are as follows:

- First three characters: the MOS. The first two characters are always numbers, but the third character is always a letter. The two-digit number is usually (but not always) synonymous with the career management field (CMF). For example, CMF 11 covers infantry, so MOS 11B is "rifle infantryman". Among the letters, Z is reserved for "senior sergeant" (E-8), such that 11Z is "senior infantry sergeant".
- The fourth character of the MOSC represents skill level (commensurate with rank and grade):
  - "0" is used to identify personnel undergoing training for award of a primary MOS (PMOS).
  - "1" identifies a private (PVT) through specialist (SPC/pay grade E-4) or corporal (CPL/also pay grade E-4)
  - "2" identifies a sergeant (SGT/pay grade E-5)
  - "3" identifies a staff sergeant (SSG/pay grade E-6)
  - "4" identifies a sergeant first class (SFC/pay grade E-7)
  - "5" identifies a master sergeant (MSG) or first sergeant (1SG) (see E-8, below)
  - "6" identifies a sergeant major (SGM/pay grade E-9) or command sergeant major (CSM/pay grade E-9) (as of 1 April 2011)
- Fifth character: a letter or number and a special qualification identifier (SQI). It may be associated with any MOS unless otherwise specified. Only enlisted soldiers without any special SQI are assigned the SQI "O" (oscar), often confused with a zero. Warrant officers without any special SQI are assigned the SQI "0" zero.
- Sixth and seventh characters: an additional skill identifier (ASI). They are an alphanumeric combination and may only be associated with specified MOSs, although in practice some ASIs are available to every MOS (e.g. ASI P5 for "master fitness trainer"). Soldiers without any ASIs are assigned the default ASI of "mk lmk00" (zero-zero).
- Eighth and ninth characters: two-letter requirements and qualifications which are a language identification code (LIC). Soldiers without a language skill are assigned the default LIC "YY" (Yankee-Yankee). Language identification codes can be found in AR 611–6.

==== MOSC for E-8 and above ====
When an enlisted soldier is promoted from sergeant first class to master sergeant in most career types, that soldier will be reclassified administratively to the "senior sergeant" of their career management field. For example, a combat engineer (MOS 12B, part of CMF 12) is promoted from sergeant first class to master sergeant. That soldier is reclassified administratively from MOS 12B to MOS 12Z "senior engineer sergeant"). An example of when this conversion occurs at the MSG to SGM level is the 68 (formerly the 91) CMF. In this case, the soldier becomes a 68Z at the SGM level, not the MSG level. When promoted from master sergeant or first sergeant or sergeant major to command sergeant major, that soldier will be reclassified administratively from their previous "senior sergeant" MOS to the MOS 00Z (zero-zero-zulu), "command sergeant major". Some MOS do not change though, for example 25U starts out as 25U1O (E1-E4), and advances though 25U2O (E5/SGT), 25U3O (E6/SSG), 25U4O (E7/SFC), and 25U5O (E8, E9/MSG, 1SG, SGM, CSM)

=== Warrant officers ===
Warrant officers are sometimes specialized technicians and systems managers, and were not originally assigned to traditional arms or services of the Army. Approximately 50% of warrant officers are aviators (aircraft pilots, rotary wing and fixed wing), and can be appointed directly from civilian life or within the service, regardless of previous enlisted MOS. The remaining 50% are technicians appointed from experienced enlisted soldiers and NCOs in a "feeder" MOS directly related to the warrant officer MOS.

During 2004, all army warrant officers began wearing the insignia of their specialty's proponent branch rather than the 83-year-old "Eagle Rising" distinctive warrant officer insignia. The following year, a revision of commissioned officer professional development and career management integrated warrant officer career development with the officer career development model. In practice, warrant officer MOSC are very similar to enlisted codes except they begin with three digits instead of two before the first letter, and do not have a "skill level" identifier. They are then followed by the SQI, ASI, and SLI as an enlisted MOS would be.

=== Officers ===
Commissioned officers' occupational codes are structured somewhat differently. A newly commissioned army officer first receives a "career branch". This is similar to the career management field of the enlisted personnel. Career branch numbers range from 11 to 92. For example: 13 for field artillery, 19 for armor/armored cavalry and 92 for quartermaster. Within each occupational field, there are usually several codes available. Within armor (branch 19) there are three specialties available: 19A (armor, general), 19B (armor), and 19C (cavalry). After an officer's fifth or sixth year of service, he or she may receive a "functional area" designation. More specific than a career branch, this is a specific skill set in which the officer is proficient. For example, an artillery officer who attends a Functional Area (FA) course can receive an FA code.

== Marine Corps ==
The U.S. Marine Corps begins by separating all jobs into "occupational fields" (OccFld), in which no distinction is made between officers and enlisted Marines. The fields are numbered from 01 to 99 and include general categories (intelligence, infantry, logistics, public affairs, ordnance, etc.) under which specific jobs fall.

Each field contains multiple MOS's, each designated by a four-digit numerical indicator and a job title. Most fields have at least one "basic MOS" for enlisted, and one "basic MOS" for officers, who have yet to be fully trained in any other MOS within that field. Upon completion of required training, the Marine is reclassified from their "basic MOS" to a "primary MOS" in which Marines generally will serve the remainder of their careers, be assigned, seek promotion, and be retained.

Additionally, many fields have specialty MOS's, such as "necessary MOS's", for which there may be varying prerequisites and assignment criterion. Marines do not compete for promotion or retention based on their NMOS, only their PMOS (or basic MOS, for those who have yet to complete training for a PMOS). A Marine who earns an NMOS retains it in their service records as an additional MOS beyond their PMOS, and multiple NMOS's (and PMOS's, in some cases) may be earned showing additional skills.

For example, the infantry field (03) has multiple enlisted classifications:

- basic infantry Marine (Basic MOS 0300),
- rifleman (Primary MOS 0311),
- light armored reconnaissance Marine (Primary MOS 0313),
- combat rubber reconnaissance craft (CRRC) coxswain (Necessary MOS 0316),
- scout sniper (Necessary MOS 0317),
- reconnaissance Marine (Primary MOS 0321),
- reconnaissance Marine (parachute qualified) (Necessary MOS 0323),
- reconnaissance Marine (combatant diver qualified) (Necessary MOS 0324),
- reconnaissance Marine (parachute and combatant diver qualified) (Necessary MOS 0326),
- machine gunner (Primary MOS 0331),
- mortarman (Primary MOS 0341),
- infantry assault Marine (Primary MOS 0351),
- antitank missile gunner (Primary MOS 0352),
- light armored reconnaissance leader (Primary MOS 0363),
- infantry squad leader (Primary MOS 0365),
- light armored reconnaissance master gunner (Necessary MOS 0367),
- infantry unit leader (Primary MOS 0369),
- critical skills operator (Primary MOS 0372),
- light armored reconnaissance operations chief (Primary MOS 0393), and
- operations chief (Primary MOS 0399).

Each of the jobs have authorized ranks associated with them. For example, anyone ranking from private to sergeant can be a rifleman (0311), but only Marines ranking from staff sergeant to gunnery sergeant can be an infantry unit leader (0369).

Duties and tasks are identified by rank because the Marine Corps MOS system is designed around the belief that increased duties and tasks accompany promotions. The first two digits designate the field and, the last two digits identify the promotional channel and specialty.

For example, the MOS 0311 indicates that it is in occupational field 03 (infantry) and designates the "rifleman" (11) MOS. For warrant officers, the MOS 2305 indicates that it is in occupational field 23 (ammunition and explosive ordnance disposal) and designates the "explosive ordnance disposal officer" (05) MOS. For officers, the MOS 0802 indicates that it is in occupational field 08 (field artillery) and designates the "field artillery officer" (02) MOS.

== Navy ==
On September 29, 2016, the Navy announced it would "modernize" all rating titles for Sailors with a new classification system that would move towards occupational specialty codes similar to how the other services operate.

Former Master Chief Petty Officer of the Navy Michael Stevens led the controversial review earlier that year for the Secretary of the Navy on behalf of Chief of Naval Operations, Admiral John Richardson.

Initially, the Navy Rating Modernization System eliminated all rating titles. The former Master Chief Petty Officer of the Navy, Steven S. Giordano, said:

"Sailors would no longer be called, 'Yeoman Second Class' or YN2, for example," he said. "Instead they will be 'Second Class Petty Officer, or 'Petty Officer.' However, Sailors' rates will not change: an E-7 will remain a Chief Petty Officer and an E-3 will remain a Seaman. Additionally, there will no longer be a distinction between 'airman, fireman and seaman.'"

The fleet at large did not respond to this favorably. As a result, Admiral Richardson rescinded this change on December 21, 2016, restoring all rating titles.

However, the plan retains the goal of producing sailors with more than one NOS, which might give them a broader range of professional experience and expertise and will be grouped under career fields that will enable flexibility to move between occupational specialties within the fields and will be tied to training and qualifications.

The transformation will occur in phases over a multi-year period and the Chief of Naval Personnel will lead the implementation efforts

The United States Navy has not released its NOS details yet and has not changed "designators" for officers.

=== Enlisted personnel ratings ===
The Navy indicates its "ratings" by a two or three character code based on the actual name of the rating. These range from ABE (aviation boatswain's mate – equipment) to YN (Yeoman). Each sailor and chief petty officer wears a rating badge indicating their rating as part of their rate (rank) insignia on full dress and service dress uniforms.

=== Commissioned officer designators ===
The navy officer "designator" is similar to an MOS but is less complicated and has fewer categories. For example, a surface warfare officer with a regular commission has a designator of 1110; a reserve officer has an 1115 designator. A reserve surface warfare officer specializing in nuclear training (i.e., engineer on a carrier) has a designator of 1165N. Navy officers also have one or more three-character additional qualification designators (AQD) that reflect completion of requirements qualifying them in a specific warfare area or other specialization. In some senses this functions more like the MOS in other services. An officer with the naval aviator designator of 1310 might have an AQD of DV3, SH-60F carrier anti-submarine warfare helicopter pilot, or DB4, F-14 fighter pilot. An officer designated 2100, medical corps officer (physician) may hold an AQD of 6CM, trauma surgeon, or 6AE, flight surgeon who is also a naval aviator. Some AQDs may be possessed by officers in any designator, such as BT2, freefall parachutist, or BS1, shipboard Tomahawk strike officer. Navy officer designators and AQD codes may be found in NAVPERS 15839I, The Manual of Navy Officer Manpower and Personnel Classification.ip

== Air Force ==
The Air Force utilizes a similar system, but titled "Air Force Specialty Code" (AFSC). Enlisted airmen have a five digit code, and officers have a four digit code.

== Coast Guard ==
The United States Coast Guard does not use the military occupational specialty concept either, instead dividing their occupational specialties into groups such as aviation, administrative and scientific, deck and weapons, and engineering and hull. Their rating system is very similar to the US Navy (e.g., BM, boatswain's mate).

=== Enlisted personnel ratings ===
The Coast Guard indicates its "ratings" by a two or three character code based on the actual name of the rating. These range from AMT (aviation maintenance technician) to YN (yeoman). Coast Guardsmen wear a rating badge indicating their rating as part of their rate (rank) insignia on full dress and service dress uniforms.

== See also ==
- List of United States Army careers including MOS codes
- Comparative military ranks
