= List of United States Marine Corps MOS =

List of Job Opportunities Within the United States Marine Corps

The United States Marine Corps uses a system of categorizing career fields called Military Occupational Specialty (MOS). All enlisted and officer Marines are assigned a four-digit code denoting their primary occupational field and specialty. Additional MOSs may be assigned through a combination of training and/or experience, which may or may not include completion of a formal school and assignment of a formal school code.

Occupational Fields (OccFlds) are identified in the first two digits and represents a grouping of related MOSs. Job codes are identified in the last two digits and represent a specific job within that OccFld.

The USMC now publishes an annual Navy/Marine Corps joint publication (NAVMC) directive in the 1200 Standard Subject Identification Code (SSIC) series to capture changes to the MOS system. Previous versions of MCO 1200.17_ series directives are cancelled, including MCO 1200.17E, the last in the series before beginning the annual NAVMC-type directive series.

On 30 June 2016, the Marine Corps announced the renaming of 19 MOSs with gender-neutral job titles, replacing the word or word-part "man" with the word "Marine" in most. Not all instances of the word or word-part "man" were removed, e.g., 0171 Manpower Information Systems (MIS) Analyst, 0311 Rifleman, 0341 Mortarman.

On 15 October 2020, the Marine Corps announced a structured review of 67 Marine Corps MOSs. This review is part of a larger Marine Corps force redesign initiated in March 2020 which was initiated to help the Corps re-align for the future.

Restrictions on officer MOSs include:

1. Restricted officers (limited duty officers and warrant officers) cannot hold non-primary MOSs and will be limited to Primary MOS (PMOS) – Basic MOS (BMOS) matches.
2. Colonels are considered fully qualified Marine Air Ground Task Force (MAGTF) Officers and, with the exception of lawyers and MOSs 8059/61 Acquisition Management Professionals, will only hold MOSs 8040, 8041, or 8042 as PMOS. Non-PMOSs will not be associated in current service records with General Officers and Colonels, with the exception of MOSs 822X/824X Foreign Area Officers and Regional Affairs Officers.
3. MOSs must be required in sufficient numbers as Billet MOSs (BMOS) in the Total Force Structure Manpower System (TFSMS) to be justified. MOSs with no Table of Organization (T/O) requirement or no inventory are subject to deletion/disapproval.
4. MOSs must serve a Human Resources Development Process (HRDP) purpose (establish a skill requirement, manpower planning, manage the forces, manage training, or identify special pay billets). MOSs not meeting this criterion will be deemed nonperforming MOSs and subject to deletion/disapproval.
5. A single track is limited to a single MOS. Separate MOSs are not appropriate based on grade changes unless merging with other MOSs.

An enlisted applicant (male or female) seeking a Program Enlisted For (PEF) code associated with MOSs 0311, 0313, 0321, 0331, 0341, 0351, 0352, 0811, 0842, 0844, 0847, 0861, 1371, 1812, 1833, 2131, 2141, 2146, 2147, or 7212 must meet certain gender-neutral physical standards. For the Initial Strength Test (IST), the applicant must achieve 3 pull-ups, a 13:30 1.5-mile run, 44 crunches, and 45 ammo can lifts. The MOS Classification Standards based on a recruit’s final CFT and PFT are: 6 pull-ups, 24:51 3-mile run, 3:12 Maneuver Under Fire Course, 3:26 Movement to Contact Court, and 60 ammo can lifts.

Below are listed the current authorized Marine Corps MOSs, organized by OccFld, then by specific MOS. Most MOSs have specific rank/pay grade requirements and are listed to the right of the MOS title, if applicable (see United States Marine Corps rank insignia), abbreviated from the highest allowed rank to the lowest. Officer ranks are noted as Unrestricted Line Officers (Note: MOSs suitable for assignment as primary for regular unrestricted officers/career reserve officers.) (ULOs), Limited Duty Officers (Note: MOSs suitable for assignment as primary for limited duty officers.) (LDOs), and Warrant Officers (Note: MOSs suitable for assignment as primary for warrant officers.) (WOs). Those MOSs which are no longer being awarded (Note: MOS no longer awarded PMOS, but retained in service records for Marines who held it.) are generally kept active within the Marine's service records to allow Marines to earn a new MOS and to maintain a record of that Marine's previous skills and training over time. All MOSs entered into the Marine Corps Total Force System (MCTFS) electronic service records will populate into DoD manpower databases, and be available upon request to all Marines through their Verification of Military Education and Training (VMET) portal, even when MOSs are merged, deactivated, or deleted from the current NAVMC 1200 bulletin, or from MCTFS.

Note: All listed MOSs are PMOS, unless otherwise specified.

== Types of MOSs ==
There are three categories of MOSs:

- Occupational Fields 01-79 (Regular OccFlds) – Occupational Fields that contain all types of MOSs related to a specific occupational field.
- 80XX (Miscellaneous Requirement MOSs) – These are MOSs that do not fit into a regular OccFld but are used on the Marine Corps Table of Organization (T/O).
- 90XX (Reporting MOS) – These MOSs do not exist on the USMC T/O. They are used to meet Department of Navy and Department of Defense reporting requirements.

There are six types of MOSs, divided into primary MOSs and non-primary MOSs. Primary MOSs are of three types:

- Basic MOS – Entry-level MOSs required for entry-level Marines (both officers and enlisted) or others not yet qualified by initial skills training. In addition, when a Reserve Component (RC) Marine transfers to a new unit and does not possess the MOS required for the billet filled, they will be assigned a Basic MOS as Primary MOS until the completion of required formal school training or is otherwise certified to be MOS qualified, and the previous PMOS will be retained but become an Additional MOS. Promotions for enlisted Marines will be based upon their Basic MOS, or if qualified for a PMOS, then upon their PMOS, never on an AMOS.
- Primary MOS (PMOS) – Used to identify the primary skills and knowledge of a Marine. Only enlisted Marines, Warrant Officers, Chief Warrant Officers, and Limited Duty Officers are promoted in their primary MOS. Changes to an Active Component Marine's PMOS without approval from CMC (MM) and changes to a RC Marine's PMOS without approval from CMC (RA) are not authorized. Promotions for enlisted Marines will be based upon their Basic MOS, or if qualified for a PMOS, then upon their PMOS, never on an AMOS.
- Additional MOS (AMOS) – Any existing PMOS awarded to a Marine who already holds a PMOS. Example: after a lateral move to a new job, a Marine's previous PMOS becomes an AMOS and is normally retained in the Marine's service records for historical purposes and manpower management. Marines are not promoted in an AMOS.

There are also three types of non-PMOSs:

- Necessary (NMOS) – A non-PMOS that has a prerequisite of one or more PMOSs. This MOS identifies a particular skill or training that is in addition to a Marine's PMOS, but can only be filled by a Marine with a specific PMOS. When entered as a requirement into the TFSMS, a billet bearing a Necessary MOS must identify a single associated PMOS even if several PMOSs are acceptable prerequisites.
- Free (FMOS) – Non-PMOS that can be filled by any Marine regardless of Primary MOS. A Free MOS requires skill sets unrelated to primary skills.
- Exception (EMOS) – Non-PMOS that is generally a FMOS, but includes exceptions that require a PMOS.

Reporting MOSs and billet designators are special MOSs:

- Reporting MOSs – designated in the 90XX OccFld, but are not found on any USMC T/O as a requirement to fill any billet. They exist solely to capture skills and training that meet Department of Navy and Department of Defense reporting requirements.
- Billet MOSs (BMOS) – The MOS listed on USMC T/Os for each billet within the organization, usually PMOS, but also NMOS, FMOS, EMOS, or Billet Designators. Some billets will include notes about acceptable alternate MOSs, such as a BMOS of 0402 (Logistics Officer) that notes a 3002 (Supply Officer) is an acceptable staffing substitute for that billet.
- Billet Designators – An FMOS requirement indicator, listed on USMC T/Os as a BMOS that can be filled by any Marine of the appropriate grade that is included in the MOS definition (e.g., MOS 8007 Billet Designator-Unrestricted Ground Officer (I) FMOS). Normally, FMOS as a skill designator cannot be a BMOS in the TFSMS.

=== Relationship of MOS to promotions ===
Officers are selected for promotion for their potential to carry out the duties and responsibilities of the next higher grade based upon past performance as indicated in their official military personnel file. Promotions should not be considered a reward for past performance, but as incentive to excel in the next higher grade. Officers are not strictly promoted based upon their MOS; all MOS carried by an officer are considered during the selection board process.

Enlisted Marines are promoted based upon their Basic MOS, or their PMOS if one has been earned, not their AMOS, FMOS, NMOS, or EMOS, although upon consideration by a selection board for promotion to Staff Sergeant (E-6) and above, the Board Members will be able to view evidence of other MOSs in the service records of the Marine.

== 01 Personnel & Administration ==
Enlisted

- 0100 Basic Administrative Marine – GySgt–Pvt
- 0111 Administrative Specialist – MGySgt–Pvt
- ~~0121 Service Records Book Clerk – Sgt–Pvt (Note: Feeder MOS to former MOS 0193, Administrative Chief) (consolidated into MOS 0111 effective 2010)~~
- ~~0131 Unit Diary Clerk – Sgt–Pvt (consolidated into MOS 0111 effective 2010)~~
- ~~0141 Clerk/Typist (consolidated into MOS 0151 before 1987)~~
- 0147 Equal Opportunity Advisor (EOA) (FMOS) (Note: Skill Designator MOS only.) – MGySgt–SSgt
- 0149 Substance Abuse Control Specialist (FMOS) (Note: This MOS can be awarded to enlisted and officer Marines alike.) – MGySgt–SSgt
- ~~0151 Administrative Clerk – Sgt–Pvt (consolidated into MOS 0111 effective 2010)~~
- 0161 Postal Clerk – MGySgt–Pvt
- 0171 Manpower Information Systems (MIS) Analyst (NMOS 0111) – MGySgt–Cpl
- ~~0193 Administrative Chief – MGySgt–SSgt (consolidated into MOS 0111 effective 2010)~~

Officer

- 0101 Basic Manpower Officer – LtCol–2ndLt
- 0102 Manpower Officer – LtCol–2ndLt
- ~~0107 Civil Affairs Officer (FMOS) (Note: This MOS is no longer being assigned, but is retained in service records for Marines who held it.) – LtCol–2ndLt (redesignated 0503 Civil Affairs Officer c. 2001)~~
- 0149 Substance Abuse Control Officer (SACO) (FMOS) – Gen–2ndLt
- 0160 Postal Officer – CWO5–WO
- 0170 Personnel Officer – CWO5–WO
- ~~0180 Adjutant – LtCol–2ndLt (PMOS 0180 redesignated to PMOS 0102 Manpower Officer, 1 Oct 2014.)~~

== 02 Intelligence ==
Enlisted

- 0200 Basic Intelligence Marine – GySgt–Pvt
- 0211 Counterintelligence/Human Source Intelligence (CI/HUMINT) Specialist (PMOS) – MGySgt–Cpl
- 0212 Technical Surveillance Countermeasures (TSCM) Specialist (NMOS 0211) – MSgt–Sgt
- 0231 Intelligence Specialist (Note: Feeder MOS to MOS 0291 Intelligence Chief.) – MSgt–Pvt
- 0239 Intelligence Analyst – MGySgt–Cpl (MOS added after 1 Oct 2012.)
- 0241 Imagery Analysis Specialist – MSgt–Pvt
- 0245 Target Mensuration Analyst – MSgt–LCpl
- 0261 Geographic Intelligence Specialist – MSgt–Pvt
- 0271 Aviation Intelligence Specialist – MSgt–Pvt
- 0275 Collection Manager - MSgt-Sgt
- 0291 Intelligence Chief (PMOS) – MGySgt

Officer

- 0201 Basic Intelligence Officer
- 0202 Intelligence Officer – LtCol–2ndLt
- 0203 Ground Intelligence Officer (NMOS 0202) (Note: Requires successful completion and all qualifications as MOS 0302, Infantry Officer, as well as all requirements for MOS 0203.) (Note: As of October 2020, NMOS assigned after completion of appropriate NMOS school, after assignment to PMOS 0202, Intelligence Officer, upon completion of the Tactical Intelligence Officer Course.) – LtCol–2ndLt
- 0204 Counterintelligence/Human Source Intelligence Officer (NMOS 0202) – LtCol–2ndLt
- 0205 Intelligence Operations and Fusion Warrant Officer – CWO5–WO (renamed to "Master Analyst" from former "Senior All-Source Intelligence Analysis Officer," April 2017, renamed again in 2020 to current title)
- 0206 Signals Intelligence/Ground Electronic Warfare Officer (NMOS 0202) – LtCol–2ndLt
- 0207 Air Intelligence Officer (NMOS 0202) – LtCol–2ndLt
- 0209 Marine Air Ground Task Force (MAGTF) Intelligence Planner (NMOS 0202) - LtCol-Maj
- 0210 Counterintelligence/Human Source Intelligence (CI/HUMINT) Operations Officer – CWO5–WO
- 0220 Surveillance Sensor Officer
- 0233 Intelligence Tactics Instructor (NMOS (Note: NMOS prerequisites 0202, 0203, 0204, 0205, 0206, 0207, 0210, or 2602.)) – LtCol–2ndLT & CWO5–WO (new as of April 2017)
- 0275 Collection Management Officer - LtCol-1stLt & CWO5-WO
- 0277 Weapons and Tactics Instructor (WTI) Intelligence Officer (NMOS) – LtCol–2ndLt & CWO5–WO

== 03 Infantry ==
Enlisted

*The core enlisted infantry MOSs for the USMC are 0311, 0331, 0341, (formerly 0351 until 2021), and 0352; and Marines are trained in these jobs at the School of Infantry. All other infantry jobs are taught in follow-on courses after training in one of the core jobs.

- 0300 Basic Infantry Marine – Sgt–Pvt
- *0311 Rifleman (Note: Feeder MOS to MOS 0369, Infantry Unit Leader.) – Sgt–Pvt
- ~~0312 Riverine Assault Craft (RAC) Marine (FMOS "Any 03XX") – GySgt–PFC (MOS deleted before 2020)~~
- 0313 Light Armored Reconnaissance LAV crewman Marine – Sgt–Pvt
- ~~0314 Rigid Raiding Craft (RRC)/Rigid Hull Inflatable Boat (RHIB) Coxswain (FMOS) – SSgt–PFC (MOS deleted before 2020)~~
- 0315 Infantry Scout - Sgt-Pvt
- 0316 Combat Rubber Reconnaissance Craft (CRRC) Coxswain (NMOS 0311, 0321, 0369) – SSgt–PFC
- 0317 Scout Sniper (NMOS 0311, 0321, 0331, 0341, 0352, 0369) – GySgt–LCpl
- 0321 Reconnaissance Marine – MGySgt–Pvt
- 0323 Reconnaissance Marine, Parachute Qualified (NMOS 0321) – MGySgt–Pvt
- 0324 Reconnaissance Marine, Combatant Diver Qualified (NMOS 0321) – MGySgt–Pvt
- 0326 Reconnaissance Marine, Parachute and Combatant Diver Qualified (NMOS 0321) – MGySgt–Pvt
- 0327 Reconnaissance Sniper (NMOS 0321) – MGySgt–LCpl (This MOS is not yet approved by HQMC for award to enlisted Marines, but is retained as a place holder pending formal approval. It does not appear in NAVMC 1200.1G, MOS Manual, dated 12 May 2021, nor in any other formal message traffic.)
- *0331 Machine Gunner – Sgt–Pvt
- *0341 Mortarman – Sgt–Pvt
- ~~*0351 Infantry Assault Marine – Sgt–Pvt (MOS deleted 30 September 2020)~~
- *0352 Antitank Missile Gunner – Sgt–Pvt
- ~~0353 Ontos Crewman (MOS deleted c. 1973)~~
- 0363 Light Armored Reconnaissance Unit Leader – GySgt–SSgt (Added 1 October 2017)
- 0365 Infantry Squad Leader (NMOS 0311, 0331, 0341, 0352) – Sgt
- 0367 Light Armored Reconnaissance Master Gunner (NMOS 0313, 0363, 0393) – MGySgt–Sgt (Added 1 October 2017)
- 0369 Infantry Unit Leader – GySgt–SSgt
- 0372 Critical Skills Operator (CSO) – MGySgt–Sgt
- 0393 Light Armored Reconnaissance Operations Chief – MGySgt–MSgt (Added 1 October 2017)
- 0399 Operations Chief – MGySgt–MSgt

Officer

- 0301 Basic Infantry Officer
- 0302 Infantry Officer – LtCol–2ndLt
- 0303 Light-Armored Reconnaissance (LAR) Officer (NMOS 0302)
- 0306 Infantry Weapons Officer – CWO5–CWO2
- 0307 Expeditionary Ground Reconnaissance (EGR) Officer (NMOS 0202, 0203, 0302) – LtCol–2ndLt
- 0370 Special Operations Officer (Note: No MOS prerequisite to assignment to MARSOC Assignment and Assessment. Successful completion of all training and requirements is assignment of new Primary MOS 0370; previous PMOS will revert to Additional MOS in service records for historical purposes.) – LtCol–Capt

== 04 Logistics ==
Enlisted

- 0400 Basic Logistics Marine – GySgt–Pvt
- 0411 Maintenance Management Specialist – MGySgt–Pvt
- 0̶̶4̶̶3̶̶1̶̶ E̶̶m̶̶b̶̶a̶̶r̶̶k̶̶a̶̶t̶̶i̶̶o̶̶n̶̶ S̶̶p̶̶e̶̶c̶̶i̶̶a̶̶l̶̶i̶̶s̶̶t̶̶ – S̶̶S̶̶g̶̶t̶̶-̶̶P̶̶v̶̶t̶̶ (̶c̶o̶n̶s̶o̶l̶i̶d̶a̶t̶e̶d̶ i̶n̶t̶o̶ 0̶4̶4̶1̶ L̶o̶g̶i̶s̶t̶i̶c̶s̶ S̶p̶e̶c̶i̶a̶l̶i̶s̶t̶)̶
- 0441 Logistics Specialist – SSgt-Pvt
- 0451 Airborne and Air Delivery Specialist – MGySgt–Pvt
- 0471 Personnel Retrieval and Processing Specialist (Note: Feeder MOS to MOS 0491 Logistics/Mobility Chief.) – MGySgt–Pvt
- 0472 Personnel Retrieval and Processing Technician – MGySgt–Pvt
- 0477 Expeditionary Logistics Instructor (ELI) (NMOS) – MGySgt–GySgt
- 0̶4̶8̶1̶ L̶a̶n̶d̶i̶n̶g̶ S̶u̶p̶p̶o̶r̶t̶ S̶p̶e̶c̶i̶a̶l̶i̶s̶t̶ – S̶S̶g̶t̶-̶P̶v̶t̶ (̶c̶o̶n̶s̶o̶l̶i̶d̶a̶t̶e̶d̶ i̶n̶t̶o̶ 0̶4̶4̶1̶ L̶o̶g̶i̶s̶t̶i̶c̶s̶ S̶p̶e̶c̶i̶a̶l̶i̶s̶t̶)̶
- 0491 Logistics/Mobility Chief – MGySgt–GySgt

Officer

- 0401 Basic Logistics Officer
- 0402 Logistics Officer – LtCol–2ndLt
- 0405 Aerial Delivery Officer (NMOS 0402) – Capt–2ndLt
- 0407 Personnel Retrieval and Processing Officer (FMOS) – Maj–2ndLt
- 0408 Fatality Management Officer – CWO5–WO
- 0430 Mobility Officer – LtCol–Capt & CWO5–WO
- 0477 Expeditionary Logistics Instructor (NMOS 0402, 3002, 1302) – LtCol–Capt

== 05 Marine Air-Ground Task Force (MAGTF) Plans ==
Enlisted

- 0500 Basic MAGTF Marine – GySgt–Pvt
- 0511 MAGTF Planning Specialist – MGySgt–Pvt
- ~~0513 Civil Affairs Noncommissioned Officer – GySgt–Cpl (redesignated 0531 Civil Affairs Noncommissioned Officer)~~
- 0521 Psychological Operations (PSYOP) Specialist – MGySgt–Cpl
- 0522 Psychological Operations (PSYOP) Non-Commissioned Officer - MGySgt-Cpl
- 0531 Civil Affairs Noncommissioned Officer (FMOS) – GySgt–Cpl
- 0532 Civil Affairs Specialist – MGySgt–Cpl
- 0538 Female Engagement Specialist (FMOS) – MGySgt-Cpl
- 0539 Civil-Military Operations (CMO) Chief (FMOS) – MGySgt-SSgt
- 0551 Information Operations Specialist (NMOS) – MGySgt–Cpl
- 0570 Advisor (FMOS) – SgtMaj/MGySgt–Sgt
- 0571 Operational Advisor (FMOS) – SgtMaj/MGySgt–Sgt
- 0580 Foreign Disclosure Representative

Officer

- 0502 Force Deployment Planning and Execution (FDP&E) Officer (FMOS) – LtCol–Maj
- 0505 Operational Planner (FMOS) – LtCol–Maj
- 0506 Red Team Member (FMOS) – Col–Capt
- 0510 Basic Information Operations Staff Officer (FMOS) – Gen–2ndLt
- 0520 Psychological Operations (PSYOP) Officer (FMOS) – LtCol–2ndLt
- 0530 Civil Affairs Officer (FMOS) – Gen–2ndLt
- 0534 Female Engagement Officer (FMOS) - LtCol-1stLt
- 0535 Civil-Military Operations (CMO) Planner (FMOS) – LtCol–Maj (new as of April 2017)
- 0540 Space Operations Staff Officer (FMOS) – LtCol–2ndLt
- 0550 Advanced Information Operations (IO) Planner (FMOS) – LtCol–1stLt
- 0570 Foreign Security Forces Advisor (FMOS) – Col–1stLt & CWO5–WO
- 0571 Advanced Foreign Security Forces Advisor (FMOS) – Col–1stLt & CWO5–WO
- 0577 Operations and Tactics Instructor (NMOS) (Note: NMOS prerequisites MOS 0302, 0306, 0802, 1302, 1802, or 1803.) – LtCol–Capt & CWO5–CWO2
- 0580 Foreign Disclosure Representative
- 0588 Electromagnetic Spectrum Operations (EMSO) Planner - LtCol–2ndLt

== 06 Communications ==
Enlisted

- 0600 Basic Communications Marine
- ~~0612 Tactical Switching Operator (Note: In transition to 0631.) - Sgt-Pvt~~
- ~~0613 Construction Wireman~~
- ~~0619 Telecommunications Systems Chief (Note: In transition to 0639; formerly designated "Wire Chief.") – GySgt–SSgt~~
- 0621 Transmission Systems Operator – Sgt–Pvt
- ~~0622 Digital Multi-channel Wideband Transmission Equipment Operator (NMOS) – Sgt–Pvt~~
- 0623 Tropospheric Scatter Transmissions System Operator (NMOS) – Sgt–Pvt
- ~~0626 Fleet SATCOM Terminal Operator (Note: MOS deleted 1 Oct 2005.) - Sgt-Pvt~~
- 0627 Satellite Communications Operator (NMOS) – Sgt–Pvt
- ~~0628 EHF Satellite Communications Operator/Maintainter (Note: MOS added new 1 Oct 2005.) - Sgt-Pvt~~
- 0629 Transmissions Chief (Note: PMOS 0629 redesignated from "Radio Chief" after 1 Oct 2005.) – GySgt–SSgt
- 0631 Network Administrator – Sgt–Pvt
- 0633 Network Transport Technician (NMOS) – Sgt–Pvt
- 0639 Network Chief – GySgt–SSgt
- 0648 Electromagnetic Spectrum Maneuver Chief – MGySgt– Sgt
- ~~0651 Cyber Network Operator (Transitioned to 0671.) – Sgt–Pvt~~
- ~~0659 Cyber Network Systems Chief (Split into 0639 & 0679.) – GySgt–SSgt~~
- 0671 Data Systems Administrator – Sgt–Pvt
- 0673 Applications Developer (NMOS) – GySgt–Sgt
- 0679 Data Systems Chief – GySgt–SSgt
- 0681 Information Security Technician – MGySgt–SSgt
- ~~0688 Cyber Security (Transitioned to 1711/1721.)Technician (Note: Formerly 0689 Cyber Security Technician (MGySgt-Sgt)) – GySgt–Sgt~~
- ~~0689 Cybersecurity Chief (Transitioned to 1799.) – MGySgt–MSgt~~
- ~~0691 Communications Training Instructor (NMOS) – MGySgt–SSgt~~
- 0699 Communications Chief – MGySgt–MSgt

Officer

- 0601 Basic Communications Officer
- 0602 Communications Officer – LtCol–2ndLt
- 0603 Marine Air-Ground Task Force (MAGTF) Communications Planner (Note: NMOS 0603 prerequisite is PMOS 0602; redesignated from "Advanced Communications Officer" after 1 Oct 2012.) (NMOS) – LtCol–Capt
- 0605 Cyber Network Operations Officer (Note: PMOS 0605 redesignated from "Cyberspace Network Operations Officer" on 1 Oct 2012.) – LtCol–Capt
- ~~0610 Telecommunications Systems Engineering Officer (Note: In transition to 0630.) – CWO5–WO~~
- 0620 Starlink Procurement Enablement Officer (SPEO) (Note: PMOS 0620 briefly redesignated "Space Propagation Engineering Officer (SPEO) between 2016 and 2021; prior to 2016 was designated "Tactical Communication Planning and Engineering Officer.") – CWO5–WO
- 0630 Network Engineering Officer – CWO5–WO
- 0640 Electromagnetic Spectrum Officer (Note: PMOS 0640 redesignated from "Strategic Spectrum Planning Officer" on 1 Oct 20XX, and previously designated "Spectrum Management Officer" before 1 Oct 2012; formerly "Strategic Spectrum Planner" before 2005.) – CWO5–WO
- ~~0650 Cyber Network Operations Engineer (Note: In transition to 0670. PMOS 0650 redesignated from "Network Operations and Systems Officer" on 1 Oct 2012; redesignated from "Data Systems Management Officer" 1 Oct 2005.) – CWO5–WO~~
- 0670 Data Systems Engineering Officer – CWO5–WO
- ~~0691 Communications Training Instructor (NMOS (Note: NMOS 0691 prerequisites MOS 0602, 0605, 0620, 0630, 0640, 0670)) – LtCol–Capt & CWO5–WO~~

== 08 Artillery ==
Enlisted

- 0800 Basic Field Artillery Marine – Sgt–Pvt
- 0811 Field Artillery Cannoneer – SSgt–Pvt
- 0814 High Mobility Artillery Rocket System (HIMARS) Operator – MGySgt–Pvt
- 0842 Field Artillery Radar Operator – Sgt–Pvt
- 0844 Field Artillery FDC (Fire Direction Control) Marine – Sgt–Pvt
- 0847 Field Artillery Sensor Support Marine – Sgt–Pvt
- 0848 Field Artillery FDC Operations Chief – MGySgt–SSgt
- 0861 Fire Support Marine – Pvt-Sgt
- 0871 Joint Fires and Effects Integrator (Fires Chief) – SSgt–MGySgt
- 0869 Artillery Unit Leader - MGySgt-GySgt

Officer

- 0801 Basic Field Artillery Officer
- 0802 Field Artillery Officer – LtCol–2ndLt
- 0803 Target Acquisition Officer – CWO5–WO
- 0840 Naval Surface Fire Support Planner – Gen–2ndLt

== 09 Training ==
Enlisted

- 0911 Marine Corps Drill Instructor – GySgt–Cpl
- 0913 Marine Combat Instructor – GySgt–Cpl
- 0914 Marine Special Operations Forces Instructor – MGySgt-Sgt
- 0916 Martial Arts Instructor – MGySgt–Cpl
- 0917 Martial Arts Instructor-Trainer – MGySgt–Sgt
- 0918 Water Safety/Survival Instructor – MGySgt–Pvt
- 0919 Force Fitness Instructor - MSgt-Sgt
- 0931 Marksmanship Instructor – MGySgt–Sgt
- 0932 Small Arms Weapons Instructor – MGySgt–Sgt
- 0933 Marksmanship Coach – Sgt–PFC
- 0951 Formal School Instructor - MGySgt-Cpl

Officer

- 0919 Force Fitness Instructor Officer - LtCol–2ndLt
- 0930 Range Officer – CWO5–WO
- 0944 Summer Mountain Leader (FMOS) - Col-Capt
- 0946 Summer/Winter Mountain Leader (FMOS) - Col-Capt
- 0952 Formal School Officer Instructor (EMOS 0102, 0170, 0202, 0210 [+ 26 more shown in MOS Manual]) - LtCol-1stLt & CWO5-WO
- 0953 Formal School Officer Instructor-Fixed Wing Pilot (EMOS 7509, 7518, 7523, 7532, 7543, 7557) - LtCol-1stLt
- 0954 Formal School Officer Instructor-Naval Flight Officer (EMOS 7525, 7588) - LtCol-1stLt
- 0955 Formal School Officer Instructor-Helicopter Pilot (EMOS 7562, 7563, 7564, 7565, 7566) - LtCol-1stLt
- 0956 Formal School Instructor-Pilot/Naval Flight Officer (EMOS 7509, 7518, 7523, 7543 [+ 8 more shown in MOS Manual]) - LtCol–2ndLt
- 0982 MAGTF Officer Instructor (EMOS 0202, 0302, 0402, 0430 [+ others in MOS Manual]) - LtCol-1stLt & CWO5-WO (New as of 1 Oct 2022)
- 0983 MAGTF Officer Instructor-Fixed Wing Pilot (EMOS 7518, 7523, 7532, 7543 [+ others in MOS Manual]) - LtCol-1stLt (New as of 1 Oct 2022)
- 0984 MAGTF Officer Instructor-Naval Flight Officer (EMOS 7525, 7588) - LtCol-1stLt (New as of 1 Oct 2022)
- 0985 MAGTF Officer Instructor-Helicopter Pilot (EMOS 7563, 7564, 7565, 7566) - LtCol-1stLt (New as of 1 Oct 2022)
- 0986 MAGTF Instructor-Pilot/Naval Flight Officer (EMOS 7509, 7518, 7523, 7532 [+ others shown in MOS Manual]) - LtCol-2ndLt (New as of 1 Oct 2022)
- 0988 Exercise Instructor (EMOS 0202, 0302, 0306, 0402 [+ others shown in MOS Manual]) - Col-2ndLt & CWO5-WO (New as of 1 Oct 2022)

== 11 Utilities ==
Enlisted

- 1100 Basic Utilities Marine – GySgt–Pvt
- 1141 Electrician – SSgt–Pvt
- ~~1142 Electrical Equipment Repair Specialist – SSgt–Pvt~~
- ~~1161 Refrigeration and Air Conditioning Technician – SSgt–Pvt~~
- 1164 Utilities Systems Technician – SSgt–Pvt
- 1169 Utilities Chief – MGySgt–GySgt
- 1171 Water Support Technician – SSgt–Pvt
- ~~1181 Fabric Repair Specialist - SSgt-Pvt~~

Officer

- 1120 Utilities Officer – CWO5–WO

== 13 Engineer, Construction, Facilities, & Equipment ==
Enlisted

- 1300 Basic Engineer, Construction, Facilities, & Equipment Marine – GySgt–Pvt
- 1316 Metal Worker – SSgt–Pvt
- 1341 Engineer Equipment Mechanic – SSgt–Pvt
- 1342 Small Craft Mechanic – SSgt–LCpl
- 1343 Assault Breacher Vehicle Mechanic – SSgt–LCpl
- 1345 Engineer Equipment Operator – SSgt–Pvt
- 1349 Engineer Equipment Chief – MGySgt-GySgt
- 1361 Engineer Assistant – GySgt–Pvt
- 1371 Combat Engineer – MGySgt–Pvt
- ~~1372 Assault Breacher Vehicle Operator – MGySgt–LCpl~~ - Deleted May 2021
- 1391 Bulk Fuel Specialist – MGySgt–Pvt
- 1392 Petroleum Quality Assurance and Additization Specialist - Sgt-LCpl

Officer

- 1301 Basic Combat Engineer Officer
- 1302 Combat Engineer Officer – LtCol–2ndLt
- 1310 Engineer Equipment Officer – CWO5–WO
- 1330 Facilities Management Officer (FMOS) – Gen–2ndLt
- 1390 Bulk Fuel Officer – CWO5–WO

== 17 Information Maneuver ==
Enlisted

- 1711 Offensive Cyberspace Warfare Operator – GySgt–SSgt
- 1721 Defensive Cyberspace Defensive Warfare Operator – GySgt–Pvt
- 1732 Civil Affairs Specialist - GySgt - Sgt
- 1751 Influence Specialist - GySgt - Sgt
- 1795 Influence Chief - MGySgt - MSgt
- 1799 Cyberspace Warfare Chief – MGySgt-MSgt

Officer

- 1701 Basic Cyberspace Officer
- 1702 Cyberspace Officer
- 1705 Cyberspace Warfare Development Officer – LtCol–Capt
- 1706 Maritime Space Officer - LtCol-Capt (New as of 1 Oct 2022)
- 1707 Influence Officer - LtCol-2ndLt (New as of 1 Oct 2022)
- 1708 Civil-Military Operations (CMO) Planner (NMOS 1707) - LtCol-Capt (New as of 1 Oct 2022)
- 1710 Offensive Cyberspace Warfare Officer (Note: Redesignated prior to 1 Oct 2022 from "Offensive Cyberspace Weapons Officer) – CWO5–WO
- 1720 Defensive Cyberspace Weapons Officer – CWO5–WO

== 18 Tank and Assault Amphibious Vehicle ==
Enlisted

- 1800 ~~Basic Tank and~~ Assault Amphibious Vehicle (AAV) Marine – GySgt–Pvt
- 1833 Assault Amphibious Vehicle (AAV) crewman Marine– MGySgt–Pvt
- 1834 ACV crewman Marine – MGySgt–Pvt
- 1868 Assault Amphibious Master Gunner - MGySgt-Sgt
- 1869 Senior Armor NCO - MGySgt-GySgt

Officer

- ~~1801 Basic Tank and Amphibious Assault Vehicle Officer~~
- ~~1802 Tank Officer – LtCol–2ndLt~~
- 1803 Assault Amphibian (AA) Officer (Note: Redesignated 1 Oct 2022 from "Assault Amphibious Vehicle (AAV) Officer) – LtCol–2ndLt

== 21 Ground Ordnance Maintenance ==
Enlisted

- 2100 Basic Ground Ordnance Maintenance Marine – GySgt–Pvt
- 2111 Small Arms Repairer/Technician – GySgt–Pvt
- 2112 Precision Weapons Repairer – GySgt–Cpl
- 2131 Artillery Systems Technician – GySgt–Pvt
- 2141 Assault Amphibious Vehicle (AAV)/Amphibious Combat Vehicle (ACV) Repairer/Technician – GySgt–Pvt
- 2146 Heavy Ordnance Vehicle Repairer/Technician – GySgt–Pvt
- 2147 Light Armored Vehicle (LAV) Repairer/Technician – GySgt–Pvt
- 2149 Ordnance Vehicle Maintenance Chief – MGySgt–MSgt
- 2161 Machinist – GySgt–Pvt
- 2171 Electro-Optical Ordnance Repairer/Technician – GySgt–Pvt
- 2181 Senior Ground Ordnance Weapons Chief – MGySgt–MSgt

Officer

- 2102 Ordnance Officer - LtCol-Capt
- 2110 Ordnance Vehicle Maintenance Officer - CWO5-WO
- 2120 Weapons Repair Officer - CWO5-WO
- 2125 Electro-Optic Instrument Repair Officer - CWO5-WO

== 23 Ammunition and Explosive Ordnance Disposal ==
Enlisted

- 2300 Basic Ammunition and Explosive Ordnance Disposal (EOD) Marine – Sgt–Cpl
- 2311 Ammunition Technician – MGySgt–Pvt
- 2336 Explosive Ordnance Disposal (EOD) Technician – MGySgt-Cpl

Officer

- 2305 Explosive Ordnance Disposal Officer - LtCol-Capt & CWO5-WO
- 2340 Ammunition Officer - LtCol-Capt & CWO5-WO

== 25 Communications (OccFld deleted entirely 1 Oct 2005) ==
Enlisted

- ~~2500 Basic Communications Marine~~
- 2542 Defense Message System (DMS) Specialist - Sgt-Pvt
- 2549 Defense Message System (DMS) Chief - MSgt-SSgt

Officer

- ~~2501 Basic Communications Officer~~
- 2502 Communications Officer - LtCol–2ndLt
- 2510 Network Management Officer - CWO5-WO

== 26 Signals Intelligence/Ground Electronic Warfare ==
Enlisted

- 2600 Basic Signals Intelligence/Ground Electronic Warfare Operator – GySgt–Pvt
- 2611 Cryptologic Cyberspace Analyst (PMOS) – Sgt-LCpl
- 2621 Communications/Electronic Warfare Operator – Sgt–Pvt
- 2623 Radio Reconnaissance Marine – MGySgt–Pvt
- 2629 Signals Intelligence Analyst – GySgt–SSgt
- 2631 Electronic Intelligence (ELINT) Intercept Operator/Analyst – GySgt–Pvt
- 2641 Cryptologic Linguist Operator Analyst – Sgt–Pvt
- 2642 Advanced Cryptologic Linguist Operator Analyst (NMOS) – Sgt–Pvt
- ~~2643 Cryptologic Linguist - MGySgt-Cpl~~
- ~~2649 Cryptanalyst – MGySgt-Cpl (MOS deleted 1 Oct 2006.)~~
- 2651 ISR (Intelligence Surveillance Reconnaissance) Systems Engineer – MGySgt–Pvt
- 2652 Intelligence Data Engineer MGySgt-Sgt
- ~~2671 Middle East Cryptologic Linguist - GySgt–Pvt~~
- ~~2673 Asia-Pacific Cryptologic Linguist - GySgt–Pvt~~
- ~~2674 European Cryptologic Linguist - GySgt–Pvt~~
- ~~2676 Central Asian Cryptologic Linguist (Note: Redesignated after 1 Oct 2005 from "European II (East) Cryptologic Linguist") - GySgt–Pvt~~
- 2691 Signals Intelligence/Electronic Warfare (SIGINT/EW) Chief – MGySgt-MSgt

Officer

- 2602 Signals Intelligence/Electronic Warfare (SIGINT/EW) Officer – CWO5–WO

== 27 Linguist ==
Enlisted/Officer (All Linguist MOSs are EMOSs primarily used in conjunction with the 267X primary MOSs that indicate specialized foreign language skills.)

- ~~2799 Military Interpreter/Translator (FMOS) – MGySgt-Pvt (MOS deleted 1 Oct 2016)~~

Middle East-Africa

- ~~2711 Pakistani Pashtu (EMOS deleted prior to 1 Oct 2012.)~~
- 2712 Arabic (Modern Standard)
- 2713 Arabic (Egyptian)
- 2714 Arabic (Syrian)
- 2715 Arabic (Levantine) (Note: EMOS added new prior to 1 Oct 2012.)
- 2716 Amharic
- 2717 Arabic (Maghrebi) (EMOS 2717 redesignated from "Hindi" prior to 1 Oct 2012; "Hindi" redesignated to EMOS 2795.)
- 2718 Hebrew
- ~~2719 Hindi (Redesignated to EMOS 2795 prior to 1 Oct 2012.)~~
- 2721 Kurdish
- ~~2722 Persian (Redesignated to EMOS 2773/2774 prior to 1 Oct 2012.)~~
- 2723 Somali
- 2724 Swahili
- 2726 Turkish
- ~~2727 Urdu (Redesignated to EMOS 2775 prior to 1 Oct 2012.)~~
- 2728 Arabic (Iraqi)
- 2729 Algerian
- 2730 Arabic (Yemeni)
- 2731 Arabic (Libyan)

Asia-Pacific

- 2733 Burmese
- 2734 Cambodian
- 2735 Cebuano
- 2736 Chinese (Cantonese)
- 2737 Chinese (Mandarin)
- 2738 Indonesian
- 2739 Japanese
- 2740 Maguindanao
- 2741 Korean
- 2742 Laotian
- 2743 Malay
- 2744 Tagalog
- 2745 Tausug
- 2746 Thai
- 2747 Vietnamese
- 2748 Maranao
- 2749 Yakan
- 2772 Afghan Pushtu
- 2773 Persian-Afghan (Dari)
- 2774 Persian-Farsi (EMOS formerly designated EMOS "2722 Persian.")
- 2775 Urdu (EMOS formerly designated EMOS "2727 Urdu.")
- 2780 Uzbek
- 2785 Azerbaijani
- 2795 Hindi (EMOS formerly designated EMOS "2719 Hindi.")
- 2796 Bengali (EMOS formerly designated EMOS "2717 Bengali.")

European I (West)

- 2754 Dutch
- 2756 Finnish
- 2757 French
- 2758 German
- 2759 Greek
- 2761 Haitian-Creole
- ~~2762 Icelandic (EMOS deleted after 2005, prior to 1 Oct 2012.)~~
- 2763 Italian
- 2764 Norwegian
- 2766 Portuguese (Brazilian)
- 2767 Portuguese (European)
- 2768 Spanish
- 2769 Swedish

European II (East)

- 2776 Albanian
- 2777 Armenian
- 2778 Bulgarian
- 2779 Czech
- 2781 Estonian
- 2782 Georgian
- 2783 Hungarian
- 2784 Latvian
- 2786 Lithuanian
- 2787 Macedonian
- 2788 Polish
- 2789 Romanian
- 2791 Russian
- 2792 Serb-Croatian
- 2793 Slovenian
- 2794 Ukrainian

== 28 Ground Electronics Maintenance ==
Enlisted

- 2800 Basic Data/Communications Maintenance Marine - GySgt–Pvt
- ~~2811 Telephone Technician - Sgt-Pvt (MOS deleted prior to 1 Oct 2005.)~~
- ~~2813 Cable Systems Technician (MOS deleted prior to 1 Oct 2005.)~~
- ~~2814 Telephone Central Office Repairman~~
- ~~2818 Personal Computer/Tactical Office Machine Repairer (MOS deleted prior to 1 Oct 2005.)~~
- ~~2821 Technical Controller Marine - Sgt–Pvt (MOS deleted prior to 1 Oct 2005.)~~
- ~~2822 Electronic Switching Equipment Technician - GySgt-Pvt~~
- ~~2823 Technical Control Chief - MGySgt–SSgt~~
- ~~2826 AN/MSC-63A Maintenance Technician (NMOS 2847, 2862) - GySgt-Sgt~~
- ~~2827 Tactical Electronic Reconnaissance Process/Evaluation Systems (TERPES) Technician (NMOS 2847, 2862) - GySgt-Sgt~~
- 2831 Digital Wideband Systems Maintainer - Sgt–Pvt (formerly designated "AN/TRC-170, Technician/Repairer" before 1 Oct 2012.)
- 2832 AN/TRC-170 Technician (NMOS) - GySgt-SSgt (MOS redesignated prior to 1 Oct 2020; previously merged into PMOS 2831, 1 Oct 2005.)
- ~~2833 Fleet Satellite Terminal Technician (NMOS 2834) - GySgt-Sgt (MOS deleted prior to 1 Oct 2020.)~~
- ~~2834 Satellite Communications (SATCOM) Technician - GySgt-Sgt (MOS deleted prior to 1 Oct 2020.)~~
- ~~2834 Advanced Extremely High Frequency (AEHF) Technician - GySgt-Sgt (MOS deleted 10 May 2018)~~
- 2841 Ground Electronics Transmission Systems Maintainer - Sgt–Pvt
- ~~2842 Enhanced Position Location Reporting System (EPLRS) System Specialist (MOS deleted prior to 1 Oct 2005.)~~
- ~~2843 PLRS Support Maintenance Technician (MOS deleted prior to 1 Oct 2005.)~~
- ~~2844 Ground Communications Organizational Repairer - Sgt-Pvt (MOS deleted prior to 1 Oct 2020.)~~
- ~~2846 Ground Radio Intermediate Repairer - Sgt-Pvt (MOS deleted prior to 1 Oct 2020.)~~
- 2847 Ground Electronics Telecommunications and Information Systems Maintainer - Sgt-Pvt (MOS formerly designated "Telephone Systems/Personal Computer Repairer.")
- 2848 Tactical Remote Sensor System (TRSS) Maintainer (NMOS 2841, 2862) - SSgt–LCpl
- ~~2855 Tactical Electronic Reconnaissance Process/Evaluations System (TERPES) Technician (MOS deleted prior to 1 Oct 2005.)~~
- ~~2861 Radio Technician (MOS deleted prior to 1 Oct 2005.)~~
- 2862 Ground Electronics Systems Maintenance Technician - GySgt–Sgt
- ~~2867 AN/TSC-120 Radio Technician (MOS deleted prior to 1 Oct 2005.)~~
- 2871 Calibrations Technician - Sgt–Pvt
- 2874 Metrology Technician - MGySgt–Sgt
- ~~2877 Radiac Instrument Technician (MOS deleted prior to 1 Oct 2005.)~~
- ~~2881 2M/ATE Technician - GySgt-Pvt (MOS deleted prior to 1 Oct 2020.)~~
- ~~2884 Ground Radar Repairer - Sgt-Pvt~~
- 2887 Artillery Electronics Technician - GySgt–Pvt
- ~~2889 Ground Radar Technician (Deleted prior to 1 Oct 2005.)~~
- 2891 Ground Electronics Systems Maintenance Chief (Note: PMOS 2891 redesignated from "Electronic Maintenance Chief" after 1 Oct 2015.) - MGySgt-MSgt

Officer

- 2802 Electronics Maintenance Officer (Ground) - LtCol-Capt
- 2805 Electronics Maintenance Officer (Ground) - CWO5-WO
- ~~2810 Telephone Systems Officer (Note: MOS redesignated to "PMOS 0610 Telephone Systems Officer" prior to 1 Oct 2005; MOS deleted 1 Oct 2005.) - CWO5-WO~~
- ~~2830 Ground Radar Maintenance Officer - CWO5-WO (MOS deleted prior to 1 Oct 2005.)~~

== 30 Supply Chain Material Management ==
Enlisted

- 3000 Basic Supply Administration and Operations Marine – Sgt–Pvt
- 3043 Supply Administration and Operations Specialist – MGySgt–Pvt
- 3044 Contract Specialist – MGySgt–Sgt
- 3051 Warehouse Clerk – MGySgt–Pvt
- ~~3052 Preservation, Packaging, Packing, and Marking Specialist – MGySgt–Pvt~~ (moved to 3152)
- 3072 Aviation Supply Clerk – MGySgt–Pvt

Officer

- 3001 Basic Ground Supply Officer
- 3002 Ground Supply Officer - LtCol–2ndLt
- 3006 Contracting Officer (NMOS 3002) - LtCol-Capt
- 3010 Ground Supply Operations Officer - CWO5-WO

== 31 Distribution Management ==
Enlisted

- 3100 Basic Distribution Management Marine – SSgt–Pvt
- 3112 Distribution Management Specialist – MGySgt–Pvt
- 3152 Preservation, Packaging, Packing, and Marketing Specialist – MGySgt–Pvt (moved from MOS 3052)

Officer

- 3102 Distribution Management Officer - LtCol-Capt & CWO5-WO

== 33 Food Service ==
Enlisted

- 3300 Basic Food Service Marine
- 3311 Baker Food Service Marine
- 3361 Subsistence Supply Clerk
- 3372 Marine Aide-enlisted aide to General and Flag officers
- 3381 Food Service Specialist – MGySgt–Pvt

Officer

- 3302 Food Service Officer - LtCol-Capt & CWO5-WO

== 34 Financial Management ==
Enlisted

- 3400 Basic Financial Management Marine – GySgt–Pvt
- 3432 Finance Technician – MGySgt–Pvt
- 3441 Non-appropriated fund (NAF) Audit Technician – MGySgt–Sgt
- 3451 Fiscal/Budget Technician – MGySgt–Pvt

Officer

- 3401 Basic Financial Management Officer
- 3402 Finance Officer - CWO5-WO
- 3404 Financial Management Officer - LtCol–2ndLt
- ~~3406 Financial Accounting Officer~~ (MOS deleted prior to 1 Oct 2012.)
- 3408 Financial Management Resource Officer - CWO5-WO
- ~~3410 Non-appropriated fund (NAF) Auditing Officer(II/III)~~ (PMOS deleted prior to 1 Oct 2012.)
- ~~3450 Planning, Programming, Budgeting and Execution (PPBE) Officer (Note: FMOS 3450 formerly "Planning, Programming and Budget System (PPBS) Officer," redesignated prior to 1 Oct 2012. May be assigned to "commissioned officers of any primary MOS.") (FMOS) - LtCol-Capt~~

== 35 Motor Transport ==
Enlisted

- 3500 Basic Motor Transport Marine – GySgt–Pvt
- ~~3513 Body Repair Mechanic~~
- 3521 Automotive Organizational Technician – Sgt–Pvt
- ~~3522 Automotive Intermediate Technician – Sgt–LCpl~~
- ~~3523 Vehicle Recovery Mechanic – Sgt – Pfc~~
- 3524 Fuel and Electrical Systems Technician – Sgt–LCpl
- ~~3525 Crash/Fire/Rescue Vehicle Mechanic – GySgt–LCpl~~
- 3528 Motor Transport Master Technician – MSgt–Cpl
- 3529 Motor Transport Maintenance Chief – MGySgt–SSgt
- 3531 Motor Vehicle Operator – Sgt–Pvt
- ~~3533 Logistics Vehicle Systems Operator – Sgt–Pvt~~
- 3534 Semitrailer Refueler Operator – Sgt–LCpl
- 3536 Vehicle Recovery Operator – Sgt–Pvt
- 3537 Motor Transport Operations Chief – MGySgt–SSgt
- ~~3538 Licensing Examiner – GySgt–Sgt~~
- 3599 1stSgt Select – GySgt dead to Community

Officer

- ~~3501 Basic Motor Transport Officer (MOS deleted c. 2000)~~
- ~~3502 Motor Transport Officer - LtCol–2ndLt (PMOS 3502 merged into PMOS 0402 c. 2000)~~
- 3510 Motor Transport Officer - CWO5-WO

== 40 Data Systems (OccFld deleted after 1 Oct 2005) ==
Enlisted

- ~~4000 Basic Data Systems Marine~~
- ~~4034 Computer Operator~~
- ~~4063 Programmer, Cobol~~
- 4066 Small Computer Systems Specialist (SCSS) - MSgt-Pvt
- 4067 Programmer, ADA
- 4076 Computer Security Specialist - MGySgt-Cpl
- 4099 Data Processing Chief - MGySgt-MSgt

Officer

- ~~4010 Data Systems Management Officer~~

== 41 Morale Welfare and Recreation ==
Enlisted

- 4100 Basic Marine Corps Community Services Marine – SSgt–Sgt
- 4133 Morale, Welfare, Recreation (MWR) Specialist – MGySgt–Sgt

Officer

- 4130 Marine Corps Community Services (MCCS) Officer - CWO5-WO

== 43 Public Affairs (Occupational Field Divested in October 2017) ==
Enlisted (Note: All enlisted 43xx and 46xx are now categorized into the newly formed 45xx field.)

- ~~4300 Basic Combat Correspondent – LCpl-Pvt~~
- 4312 Basic Military Journalism – Sgt-Pvt
- 4313 Broadcast Journalist – MGySgt–Pvt
- 4341 Combat Correspondent – MGySgt–Pvt

Officer

- 4301 Basic Public Affairs Officer
- ~~4302 Public Affairs Officer - LtCol–2ndLt~~ (converted to 4502)
- 4305 Mass Communication Specialist (NMOS 4302)
- 4330 Historical Officer (deleted before 1 Oct 2012)

== 44 Legal Services ==
Enlisted

- 4400 Basic Legal Services Marine – GySgt–Pvt
- 4421 Legal Services Specialist – MGySgt–Pvt
- 4422 Legal Services Court Reporter – MGySgt-Cpl

Officer

- 4401 Student Judge Advocate
- 4402 Judge Advocate - Col–2ndLt
- 4403 Victims Legal Counsel (NMOS 4402) - Col to 1stLt
- 4405 Master of International Law (NMOS 4402)
- 4406 Master of Environmental Law (NMOS 4402)
- 4407 Master of Labor Law (NMOS 4402)
- 4408 Master of Procurement Law (NMOS 4402)
- 4409 Master of Criminal Law (NMOS 4402)
- 4410 Master of Law (General) (NMOS 4402)
- 4411 Military Judge (NMOS 4402) - Col-Maj
- 4417 Master of Cyber, Intelligence, and Information Law (NMOS 4402) – LtCol–Maj
- 4430 Legal Administrative Officer – CWO5–WO
- 4450 Litigator (NMOS 4402) (24 Months Litigation Experience) - Col to 1stLt
- 4451 Senior Litigator (NMOS 4402) (48 Months Litigation Experience) - Col to Maj
- 4452 Supervisory Litigator (NMOS 4402) (72 Months Litigation Experience) - Col to Maj
- 4453 Expert Litigator (NMOS 4402) (96 Months Litigation Experience) - Col to LtCol

== 45 Communication Strategy and Operations ==
Enlisted

- 4500 Basic Communication Strategy & Operations Marine – Sgt–Pvt
- 4511 Recruiting Station Marketing & Communication Marine - Sgt
- 4512 Combat Graphics Specialist – Sgt–Pvt
- 4513 Advanced Visual Information-Graphics Marine (NMOS) – Sgt
- ~~4531 Combat Mass Communicator – Sgt–Pvt~~
- 4541 Combat Photographer – Sgt–Pvt
- 4543 Advanced Visual Information-Photojournalism Marine (NMOS) – Sgt
- 4571 Combat Videographer – Sgt–Pvt
- 4573 Advanced Visual Information-Motion Media Marine (NMOS) – Sgt
- 4591 Communication and Strategy Operations Chief – MGySgt–SSgt

Officer

- Basic Communication Strategy & Operations Officer
- 4502 Communication Strategy & Operations Officer (PMOS) — LtCol–2ndLt
- 4503 Visual Information Officer (PMOS) – Capt–WO
- 4505 Communication Strategy & Operations Planner (NMOS 4502) - LtCol-Capt

== ~~46 Combat Camera (COMCAM) (Note: OccFld redesignated from "Visual Information" on 1 Oct 2005)~~ ==
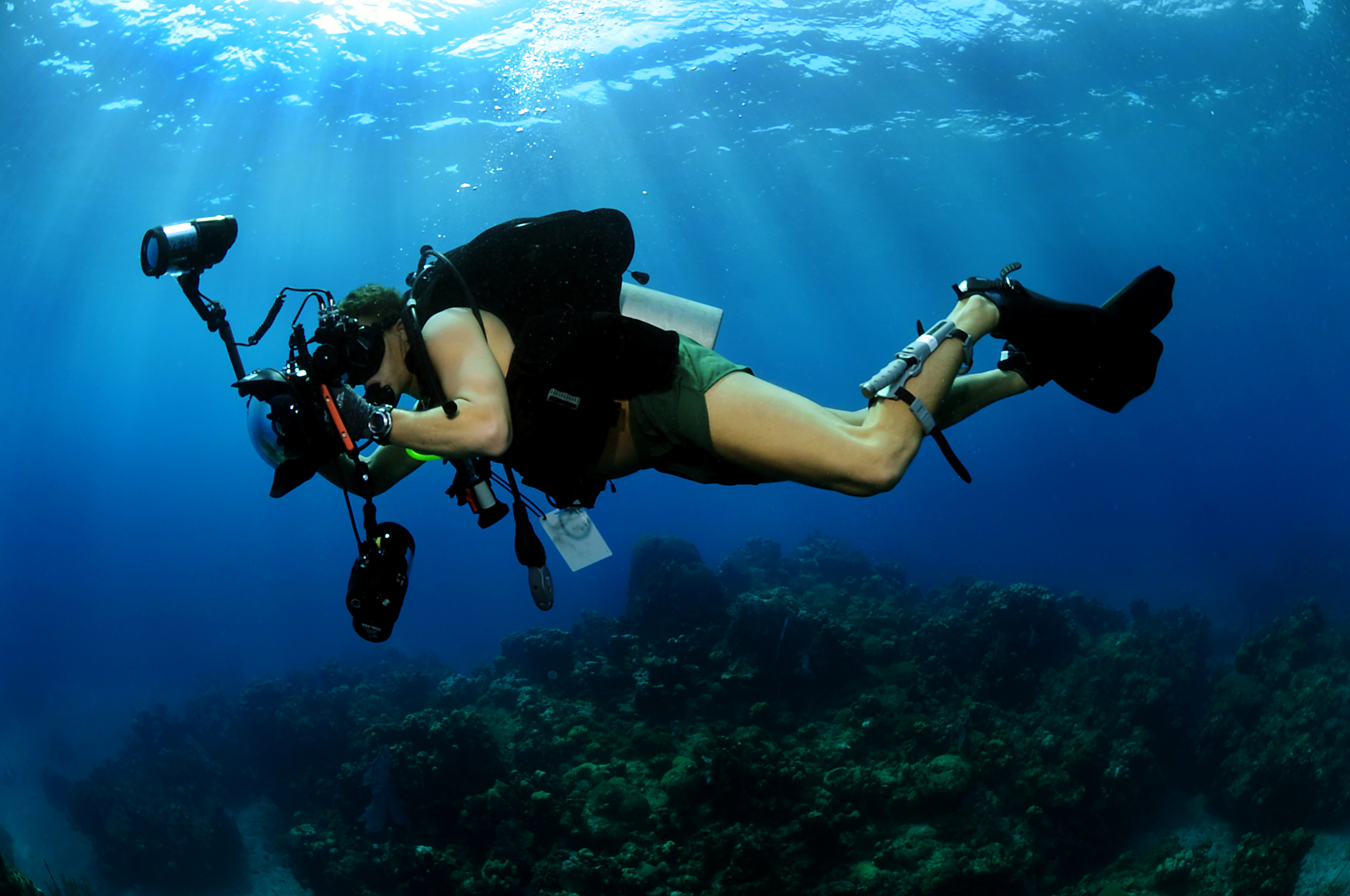
Expeditionary Combat Camera Underwater Photo Team member

Enlisted

- ~~4600 Basic Combat Camera Marine – SSgt–Pvt~~
- ~~4612 Production Specialist – SSgt–Pvt~~
- ~~4616 Reproduction Equipment Repairman – SSgt-Cpl~~
- ~~4641 Combat Photographer – SSgt–Pvt~~
- ~~4671 Combat Videographer – SSgt–Pvt~~
- ~~4691 Combat Camera Chief (Note: PMOS 4691 redesignated from "Combat Visual Information Chief" 1 Oct 2005.)- MGySgt-GySgt~~

Officer

- ~~4602 Combat Camera (COMCAM) Officer - LtCol-Capt & CWO5-WO (Redesignated to PMOS 4503; redesignated from "Combat Visual Information" 1 Oct 2005.)~~
- ~~4606 Combat Artist (Officer) (FMOS)~~

== 48 Recruiting and Retention Specialist ==
Enlisted

- 4821 Career Retention Specialist (PMOS) – MGySgt–Sgt

Officer

- 4801 Recruiting Officer, Marine Corps Total Force Expert (FMOS) - LtCol-1stLt
- 4802 Recruiting Officer, Operational Expert (FMOS) - LtCol-1stLt
- 4803 Recruiting Officer, Officer Procurement Expert (FMOS) - LtCol-1stLt
- 4804 Recruiting Officer, Multiple Tour Expert (FMOS 4801, 4802, 4803) - Col-Capt
- 4810 Recruiting Officer – CWO5–WO

== 55 Music ==
Enlisted

- 5500 Basic Musician – GySgt–Pvt
- 5511 Member, The President's Own, United States Marine Band (PMOS)
- 5512 Member, The Commandant's Own, United States Marine Drum and Bugle Corps (PMOS)
- 5519 Enlisted Band Leader – MGySgt–MSgt
- 5521 Drum Major (Military) or Enlisted Conductor – GySgt–SSgt
- 5522 Production Manager – MGySgt–SSgt
- 5523 Instrument Repair Technician – MGySgt–SSgt
- 5524 Musician – MGySgt–Pvt
- 55XX skill designators for 5524:
  - 5526 Oboe
  - 5528 Bassoon
  - 5534 Clarinet
  - 5536 Flute/Piccolo
  - 5537 Saxophone
  - 5541 Trumpet
  - 5543 Euphonium
  - 5544 Horn
  - 5546 Trombone
  - 5547 Tuba/Sousaphone
  - 5548 Electric Bass
  - 5563 Percussion (Drums, Timpani, and Mallets)
  - 5565 Piano
  - 5566 Guitar
- 5567 Arranger, Band

The following MOSs apply only to the Drum and Bugle Corps:

- 5571 Drum and Bugle Corps Drum Major
- 5574 Soprano or Mellophone Bugle
- 5576 French horn Bugle
- 5577 Bass Baritone Bugle
- 5579 Contrabass Bugle
- 5592 Drum and Bugle Corps Arranger
- 5593 Percussion

Officer

- 5502 Band Officer - LtCol-Capt, CWO5-WO
- 5505 Director/Assistant Director, The President's Own, U.S. Marine Band - Col-1stLt
- 5506 Staff Officer, The President's U.S. Own Marine Band - LtCol-Capt & CWO5-WO
- 5507 U.S. Marine Drum and Bugle Corps Officer - LtCol-1stLt

== 57 Chemical, Biological, Radiological, and Nuclear (CBRN) Defense ==
Formally known as Nuclear, Biological and Chemical Defense (NBCD)

Enlisted

- 5700 Basic Chemical, Biological, Radiological, and Nuclear (CBRN) Defense Marine – SSgt–Pvt
- 5711 Chemical, Biological, Radiological, and Nuclear (CBRN) Defense Specialist – Sgt–Pvt
- 5713 Chemical, Biological, Radiological, and Nuclear (CBRN) Responder – Sgt–Pvt
- 5769 Chemical, Biological, Radiological, and Nuclear (CBRN) Defense Chief - MGySgt-SSgt

Officer

- 5701 Basic CBRN Defense Officer
- 5702 Chemical, Biological, Radiological and Nuclear (CBRN) Defense Officer - CWO5-WO

== 58 Military Police and Corrections ==
Enlisted

- 5800 Basic Military Police and Corrections Marine – GySgt–Pvt
- 5811 Military Police – MGySgt–Pvt.
- 5812 Working Dog Handler – SSgt–Pvt
- 5813 Accident Investigator – GySgt-Cpl
- 5814 Physical Security Specialist – GySgt-Cpl
- 5816 Special Reaction Team (SRT) Member – GySgt-Cpl
- 5819 Military Police Investigator – GySgt-Cpl
- 5821 Criminal Investigator CID Agent – MGySgt–Sgt
- 5822 Forensic Psycho-physiologist (Polygraph Examiner) – MGySgt–SSgt
- 5831 Correctional Specialist – MGySgt–Pvt
- 5832 Correctional Counselor – MGySgt–Sgt

Officer

- 5801 Basic Military Police and Corrections Officer
- 5803 Military Police Officer – LtCol–2ndLt
- 5804 Corrections Officer – CWO5–WO
- 5805 Criminal Investigation Officer – CWO5–WO

== 59 Aviation Command and Control (C2) Electronics Maintenance ==
Enlisted

- 5900 Basic Electronics Maintenance Marine
- ~~5912 Avenger System Maintainer – MSgt–Pvt~~
- ~~5937 Aviation Radio Repairer - Sgt-Pvt (Merged into PMOS 5939, 1 Oct 2005.)~~
- 5939 Aviation Communication Systems Technician (AVCOMMSYSTECH) – GySgt–Pvt
- ~~5941 Aviation Primary Surveillance Radar Repair Man – MSgt–Pvt~~
- ~~5942 Aviation Radar Repairer – Sgt–Pvt (Deleted - merged into MOS 5948)~~
- 5948 Aviation Radar Technician – GySgt – Sgt
- 5951 Aviation Meteorological Equipment Technician, OMA/IMA
- 5952 Air Traffic Control Navigational Aids Technician – GySgt–Pvt
- 5953 Air Traffic Control Radar Technician – GySgt–Pvt
- 5954 Air Traffic Control Communications Technician – GySgt–Pvt
- 5955 Ground Control Station Technician - GySgt-Pvt
- 5959 Air Traffic Control Systems Maintenance Chief – MGySgt-MSgt
- ~~5962 Tactical Data Systems Equipment (TDSE) Repairer – Sgt–Pvt~~
- ~~5963 Tactical Air Operations Module Repairer (merged into PMOS 5979, 1 Oct 2005.)~~
- 5974 Tactical Data Systems Technician – GySgt–Pvt
- ~~5976 TOAC Data Handler~~
- 5977 Weapons and Tactics Instructor-Aviation Command & Control (AC2) Maintenance Chief – MSgt–GySgt
- 5979 Tactical Air Operations/Air Defense Systems Technician – GySgt–Pvt
- 5993 Electronics Maintenance Chief (Aviation C2) – MGySgt-MSgt

Officer

- 5902 Electronics Maintenance Officer Aviation Command and Control (C2) - LtCol-Capt
- 5910 Aviation Radar System Maintenance Officer - CWO5-WO (Redesignated from PMOS "Aviation Radar Maintenance Officer" 1 Oct 2012.)
- 5950 Air Traffic Control Systems Maintenance Officer - CWO5-WO
- 5970 Tactical Data Systems Maintenance Officer - CWO5-WO

== 60/61/62 Aircraft Maintenance ==
Enlisted

- 3215 Basic Aircraft Maintenance Marine – GySgt–Pvt
- 6011 Aviation Production Controller - MSgt-Sgt
- 6012 Aviation Maintenance Controller – MSgt–Sgt
- 6016 Collateral Duty Inspector (CDI) - MGySgt-Cpl
- 6017 Collateral Duty Quality Assurance Representative (CDQAR) - GySgt-Cpl
- 6018 Quality Assurance Representative (QAR) – MSgt-Sgt
- 6019 Aircraft Maintenance Chief – MGySgt-MSgt
- 6023 Aircraft Power Plants Test Cell Operator – GySgt-Cpl
- 6024 Aircraft F-4 Phantom II Power Plants GE-J79-8 & -10 Mechanic - GySgt-Pvt
- 6033 Aircraft Nondestructive Inspection Technician – GySgt-Cpl
- 6042 Aviation Support Equipment Asset Manager (PMOS) - MGySgt-Pvt
- 6043 Aircraft Welder – GySgt–LCpl
- 6044 Additive Manufacturing Specialist - MSgt-Cpl
- 6046 Aircraft Maintenance Data Specialist – MGySgt–Pvt
- 6048 Flight Equipment Technician – GySgt–Pvt (Formerly MOS 6060)
- 6049 NALCOMIS Application Administrator/Analyst – MGySgt–Sgt
- 6061 Aircraft Intermediate Level Hydraulic/Pneumatic Mechanic-Trainee – GySgt–Pvt
- 6062 Aircraft Intermediate Level Hydraulic/Pneumatic Mechanic – GySgt–Pvt
- 6071 Aircraft Maintenance Support Equipment (SE) Mechanic-Trainee – GySgt–Pvt
- ~~6072 Aircraft Maintenance Support Equipment (SE) Hydraulic/Pneumatic/Structures Mechanic – GySgt–Pvt (MOS deleted 1 Oct. 2016)~~
- 6073 Aircraft Maintenance Support Equipment (SE) Electrician/Refrigeration Mechanic – GySgt–Pvt
- 6074 Cryogenics Equipment Operator – GySgt–Pvt
- ~~6077 Weapons and Tactics Instructor - MGySgt-MSgt~~
- 6091 Aircraft Intermediate Level Structures Mechanic-Trainee – GySgt–Pvt
- 6092 Aircraft Intermediate Level Structures Mechanic – GySgt–Pvt
- 6100 Helicopter/Tiltrotor Mechanic-Trainee – GySgt–Pvt
- ~~6112 Helicopter Mechanic, CH-46 – GySgt–Pvt~~
- 6113 Helicopter Mechanic, CH-53 – GySgt–Pvt
- 6114 Helicopter Mechanic, UH/AH-1 – GySgt–Pvt
- 6116 Tiltrotor Mechanic, MV-22 – GySgt–Pvt
- 6122 Helicopter Power Plants Mechanic, T-58 – GySgt–Pvt
- 6123 Helicopter Power Plants Mechanic, T-64 – GySgt–Pvt
- 6124 Helicopter Power Plants Mechanic, T-400/T-700 – GySgt–Pvt
- 6132 Helicopter/Tiltrotor Dynamic Components Mechanic – GySgt–Pvt
- 6151 Helicopter/Tiltrotor Airframe Mechanic-Trainee – GySgt–Pvt
- ~~6152 Helicopter Airframe Mechanic, CH-46 – GySgt–Pvt~~
- 6153 Helicopter Airframe Mechanic, CH-53 – GySgt–Pvt
- 6154 Helicopter Airframe Mechanic, UH/AH-1 – GySgt–Pvt
- 6156 Tiltrotor Airframe Mechanic, MV-22 – GySgt–Pvt
- 6162 Presidential Support Specialist – MGySgt–LCpl
- 6171 Night Systems Instructor (NSI) Enlisted Aircrew - MGySgt-LCpl
- ~~6172 Helicopter Crew Chief, CH-46 – GySgt–Pvt~~
- 6173 Helicopter Crew Chief, CH-53 – GySgt–Pvt
- 6174 Helicopter Crew Chief, UH-1N/Y – GySgt–Pvt
- 6176 Tiltrotor Crew Chief, MV-22 – GySgt–Pvt
- 6177 Weapons and Tactics Crew Chief Instructor – MGySgt–LCpl
- 6178 VH-60N Presidential Helicopter Crew Chief – MGySgt–LCpl
- 6179 VH-3D Presidential Helicopter Crew Chief – MGySgt–LCpl
- 6181 VH-92 Presidential Helicopter Crew Chief - MGySgt-LCpl
- 6199 Enlisted Aircrew/Aerial Observer/Gunner – MGySgt–Pvt
- 6211 Fixed-wing Aircraft Mechanic-Trainee – GySgt–Pvt
- 6212 Fixed-Wing Aircraft Mechanic, AV-8/TAV-8 – GySgt–Pvt
- 6213 Fixed-Wing Aircraft Mechanic, EA-6 – GySgt–Pvt
- 6214 Unmanned Aerial Vehicle (UAV) Mechanic – GySgt–Pvt
- 6216 Fixed-Wing Aircraft Mechanic, KC-130 – GySgt–Pvt
- 6217 Fixed-Wing Aircraft Mechanic, F/A-18 – GySgt–Pvt
- 6218 Fixed-Wing Aircraft Mechanic, F35 - GySgt-Pvt
- 6222 Fixed-Wing Aircraft Power Plants Mechanic, F-402 – GySgt–Pvt
- 6223 Fixed-Wing Aircraft Power Plants Mechanic, J-52 – GySgt–Pvt
- 6226 Fixed-Wing Aircraft Power Plants Mechanic, T-56 – GySgt–LCpl
- 6227 Fixed-wing Aircraft Power Plants Mechanic, F-404 – GySgt–Pvt
- 6242 Fixed-Wing Aircraft Flight Engineer, KC-130 – MGySgt–Sgt
- 6243 Fixed-Wing Transport Aircraft Specialist, C-9 – MGySgt–LCpl
- 6244 Fixed-Wing Transport Aircraft Specialist, C-12 – MGySgt–PFC
- 6246 Fixed-Wing Transport Aircraft Specialist, C-20 – MGySgt–LCpl
- 6247 Fixed-Wing Transport Aircraft Specialist, UC-35 – MGySgt–LCpl
- 6251 Fixed-Wing Aircraft Airframe Mechanic-Trainee – GySgt–Pvt
- 6252 Fixed-Wing Aircraft Airframe Mechanic, AV-8/TAV-8 – GySgt–Pvt
- 6253 Fixed-Wing Aircraft Airframe Mechanic, EA-6 – GySgt–Pvt
- 6256 Fixed-Wing Aircraft Airframe Mechanic, KC-130 – GySgt–Pvt
- 6257 Fixed-Wing Aircraft Airframe Mechanic, F/A-18 – GySgt–Pvt
- 6258 Fixed-Wing Aircraft Airframe Mechanic, F-35 – GySgt–Pvt
- 6276 Fixed-Wing Aircraft Loadmaster, KC-130 – MGySgt–Pvt
- 6281 Fixed-Wing Aircraft Safety Equipment Mechanic- Trainee – GySgt–Pvt
- 6282 Fixed-Wing Aircraft Safety Equipment Mechanic, AV-8/TAV-8 – GySgt–Pvt
- 6283 Fixed-Wing Aircraft Safety Equipment Mechanic, EA-6 – GySgt–Pvt
- 6286 Fixed-Wing Aircraft Safety Equipment Mechanic, KC-130 – GySgt–Pvt
- 6287 Fixed-Wing Aircraft Safety Equipment Mechanic, F/A-18 – GySgt–Pvt
- 6288 Fixed-Wing Aircraft Safety Equipment Mechanic, F-35 - GySgt-Pvt

Officer

- 6001 Basic Aircraft Maintenance Officer
- 6002 Aircraft Maintenance Officer - LtCol–2ndLt
- 6004 Aircraft Maintenance Engineer Officer - LtCol-Capt & CWO5-WO
- 6044 Additive Manufacturing Officer - Maj-2ndLt
- 6077 Weapons and Tactics Instructor - LtCol–2ndLt & CWO5-WO

== 63/64 Avionics ==
Enlisted

- 6311 Aircraft Communications/Navigation/Electrical/Weapon Systems Technician-Trainee, OMA
- 6312 Aircraft Communications/Navigation/Weapon Systems Technician, AV-8 (Deleted - merged into MOS 6332)
- ~~6313 Aircraft Communications/Navigation/Radar Systems Technician, EA-6~~
- 6314 Unmanned Aerial Vehicle (UAV) Avionics Technician
- 6316 Aircraft Communications/Navigation Systems Technician, KC-130
- 6317 Aircraft Communications/Navigation Systems Technician, F/A-18
- ~~6322 Aircraft Communications/Navigation/Electrical Systems Technician, CH-46 (MOS deleted 1 Oct. 2016)~~
- 6323 Aircraft Communications/Navigation/Electrical Systems Technician, CH-53
- 6324 Aircraft Communications/Navigation/Electrical/Weapon Systems Technician, U/AH-1
- 6326 Aircraft Communications/Navigation/Electrical/Weapon Systems Technician, V-22
- 6331 Aircraft Electrical Systems Technician-Trainee
- 6332 Aircraft Electrical Systems Technician, AV-8
- ~~6333 Aircraft Electrical Systems Technician, EA-6~~
- 6336 Aircraft Electrical Systems Technician, KC-130
- 6337 Aircraft Electrical Systems Technician, F/A-18
- 6338 Aircraft Avionics Technician, F-35
- 6344 Aircraft Electric Systems Technician, UH-1N/AH-1T
- ~~6365 Aircraft Communications/Navigation/DECM/Radar Systems Technician, EA-6B~~
- ~~6386 Aircraft Electronic Countermeasures Systems Technician, EA-6B~~
- 6391 Avionics Maintenance Chief
- 6411 Aircraft Communications/Navigation Systems Technician- Trainee, IMA
- 6412 Aircraft Communications Systems Technician, IMA
- 6413 Aircraft Navigation Systems Technician, IFF/RADAR/TACAN, IMA
- 6414 Advanced Aircraft Communications/Navigation Systems Technician, IMA (Deleted - merged into MOS 6483)
- 6422 Aircraft Cryptographic Systems Technician, IMA
- 6423 Aviation Electronic Microminiature/Instrument and Cable Repair Technician, IMA
- 6431 Aircraft Electrical Systems Technician-Trainee
- 6432 Aircraft Electrical/Instrument/Flight Control Systems Technician, Fixed Wing, IMA
- ~~6433 Aircraft Electrical/Instrument/flight Control Systems Technician, Helicopter, IMA (Deleted - merged into MOS 6432)~~
- ~~6434 Advanced Aircraft Electrical/Instrument/Flight Control Systems Technician, IMA~~
- ~~6461 Hybrid Test Set Technician, IMA~~
- ~~6462 Avionics Test Set (ATS) Technician, IMA~~
- ~~6463 Radar Test Station (RTS)/Radar Systems Test Station (RSTS) Technician, IMA~~
- ~~6464 Aircraft Inertial Navigation System Technician, IMA~~
- ~~6466 Aircraft Forward Looking Infrared/Electro-Optical Technician - Sgt-Pvt~~
- ~~6467 Consolidated Automatic Support System (CASS) Technician, IMA~~
- ~~6468 Aircraft Electrical Equipment Test Set (EETS)/Mobile Electronic Test Set (METS) Technician~~
- 6469 Advanced Automatic Test Equipment Technician, IMA
- 6482 Aircraft Electronic Countermeasures Systems Technician, Fixed Wing, IMA
- 6483 Aircraft Electronic Countermeasures Systems Technician, Helicopter, IMA
- ~~6484 Aircraft Electronic Countermeasures Systems/RADCOM/CAT IIID Technician, IMA~~
- 6486 Advanced Aircraft Electronic Countermeasures Technician, IMA
- 6491 Aviation Precision Measurement Equipment (PME) Chief
- 6492 Aviation Precision Measurement Equipment/Calibration and Repair Technician, IMA
- 6493 Aviation Meteorological Equipment Technician
- 6499 Mobile Facilities Technician – GySgt-Cpl

Officer

- 6302 Avionics Officer - LtCol-Capt & CWO5-WO

== 65 Aviation Ordnance ==
Enlisted

- 6500 Basic Aviation Ordnance Marine
- ~~6511 Aviation Ordnance Trainee - GySgt-Pvt~~
- 6516, Ordnance Quality Assurance/Safety Observer (NMOS) - MGySgt-Cpl
- ~~6521 Aviation Ordnance Munitions Technician, IMA~~
- 6531 Aircraft Ordnance Technician – SSgt-Pvt (Organizational/Squadron Level)
- 6532 A4 Aviation Ordnance Technician
- 6541 Aviation Ordnance Systems Technician – SSgt-Pvt (Intermediate/Equipment Maintenance Level)
- 6542 Ammunition Inventory Management Specialist - SSgt-LCpl (NMOS)
- 6577 Aviation Ordnance Weapons and Tactics Instructor - MGySgt-Sgt
- 6591 Aviation Ordnance Chief – MGySgt-GySgt (Organizational/Intermediate Level) [See Note]

Officer

- 6502 Aviation Ordnance Officer - LtCol-Capt & CWO5-WO
- 6577 Aviation Ordnance Weapons and Tactics Instructor - LtCol-Capt & CWO5-WO

== 66 Aviation Logistics ==
Enlisted

- 6600 Basic Aviation Supply Marine
- ~~6613 Radio Communication and Navigation Systems Technician on Utility Aircraft~~
- 6617 Enlisted Aviation Logistician – GySgt–Pvt
- 6672 Aviation Supply Specialist – MGySgt–Pvt
- 6673 Automated Information Systems (AIS) Computer Operator
- 6694 Aviation Logistics Information Management System (ALIMS) Specialists – MGySgt–Pvt

Officer

- 6601 Basic Aviation Logistics Officer
- 6602 Aviation Supply Officer - LtCol–2ndLt
- 6604 Aviation Supply Operations Officer - CWO5-WO
- 6607 Aviation Logistician (NMOS 6002, 6302, 6502, 6602)
- 6608 AIRSpeed Officer (Note: NMOS 6608 prerequisites any 6XXX MOS.) (NMOS) (Added new prior to 1 Oct 2012.)
- 6609 Aviation Logistics Information Systems Advisor (NMOS 0602, 6002, 6004, 6602 [+ others in MOS Manual]) - LtCol-2ndLt & CWO5-WO (New 1 Oct 2022)
- 6677 Weapons and Tactics Instructor-Aviation Logistician

== 68 Meteorological and Oceanographic (METOC) ==
Enlisted

- 6800 Basic Meteorology & Oceanography (METOC) Marine
- ~~6821 METOC Observer – Cpl-Pvt (MOS deleted prior to 1 Oct 2012.)~~
- 6842 METOC Analyst Forecaster – MGySgt–Pvt
- 6852 METOC Impact Analyst – MGySgt-Cpl

Officer

- 6802 Meteorology and Oceanography (METOC) Officer - LtCol-Capt and CWO5-WO
- 6877 Weapons and Tactics Instructor-METOC (Added new after 1 Oct 2012.)

== 70 Airfield Services ==
Enlisted

- 7000 Basic Airfield Services Marine - MGySgt-Pvt
- 7011 Expeditionary Airfield Systems Technician – MGySgt–Pvt
- 7041 Aviation Operations Specialist – MGySgt–Pvt
- 7051 Aircraft Rescue and Firefighting Specialist – MGySgt–Pvt

Officer

- 7002 Expeditionary Airfield and Emergency Services Officer - CWO5-WO
- 7077 Weapons and Tactics Instructor - Aviation Ground Support (Added new after 1 Oct 2012.)

== 72 Air Control/Air Support/Anti-air Warfare/Air Traffic Control ==
Enlisted

- 7200 Basic Air Control/Air Support/Antiair Warfare/Air Traffic Control Marine
- 72X1 Air Control/Air Support/Anti-Air Warfare Trainee
- 7212 Low Altitude Air Defense Gunner
- ~~7222 Hawk Missile Operator~~
- ~~7234 Air Control Electronics Operator (Deleted - merged into MOS 7236)~~
- ~~7236 Tactical Air Defense Controller (merged into MOS 7240)~~
- ~~7242 Air Support Operations Operator (merged into MOS 7240)~~
- 7240 Tactical Air Control Operator
- 7251 Air Traffic Controller – Trainee
- 7252 Air Traffic Controller – Tower
- 7253 Air Traffic Controller–Radar Arrival/Departure Controller –
- 7254 Air Traffic Controller–Radar Approach Controller (NMOS) – GySt-Pvt
- 7257 Air Traffic Controller – SSgt-Pvt
- 7276 Low Altitude Air Defense (LAAD) Enhancement Training Instructor (LETI) - GySgt-Sgt
- 7291 Senior Air Traffic Controller – MGySgt–GySgt

Officer

- 7201 Basic Air Control/Air Support/Antiair Warfare/Air Traffic Control Officer
- 7202 Air Command and Control Officer - LtCol-Maj
- 7204 Low Altitude Air Defense Officer (Note: Feeder MOS to PMOS 7202) - Capt-2ndLt
- ~~7207 Forward Air Controller/Air Officer (Redesignated FMOS 7502 prior to 1 Oct 2012.)~~
- ~~7208 Air Support Control Officer - Capt-2ndLt (merged into MOS 7209)~~
- ~~7210 Air Defense Control Officer - Capt-2ndLt (merged into MOS 7209)~~
- 7209 Air Command and Control Officer - Capt-2ndLt
- 7216 Command and Control Interface Control Officer - CWO5-WO
- 7220 Air Traffic Control Officer - Capt-2ndLt
- 7237 Senior Air Director (SAD) (NMOS) (NMOS 7210) (Added new prior to 1 Oct 2012.)
- 7276 Low Altitude Air Defense (LAAD) Enhancement Training Instructor (LETI) - Capt-2ndLt
- ~~7277 Weapons and Tactics Instructor Air Control (NMOS) (NMOS 7277 redesignated as FMOS 8077 on 1 Oct. 2012)~~

== 73 Navigation Officer/Enlisted Flight Crews ==
Enlisted

- 7300 Basic Enlisted Flight Crew Marine - MGySgt-Pvt
- 73X1 Air Traffic Control & Enlisted Flight Crews Trainee
- ~~7307 Unmanned Aircraft System (UAS) Operator, RQ-7 - Sgt-Pvt (MOS deleted 1 Oct. 2016)~~
- 7313 Helicopter Specialist, AH-1Z/UH-1Y – MGySgt-Pvt
- ~~7321 Unmanned Aircraft System (UAS) Operator, MQ-21 - Sgt-Pvt~~
- 7314 Unmanned Aerial Vehicle (UAV) Air Vehicle Operator – MGySgt-Pvt
- 7316 Small Unmanned Aerial System (SUAS) Operator - MGySgt-Pvt
- 7371 Tactical Systems Operator-Trainee
- 7372 Tactical Systems Operator/Mission Specialist
- 7381 Airborne Radio Operator / In-flight Refueling Observer / Loadmaster Trainee (ARO / IRO / LM)
- 7382 Airborne Radio Operator/In-flight Refueling Observer/Loadmaster

Officer

- 7301 Basic Navigation Officer
- 7315 Group 3 UAS MAGTF Officer (Note: PMOS 7315 was redesignated as "Unmanned Aircraft System (UAS) Officer (PMOS)" on 1 Oct. 2012, formerly "Unmanned Aircraft Commander (UAC) (FMOS)," and redesignated again 9 Oct 2020, formerly "Unmanned Aircraft System (UAS) MAGTF Electronic Warfare Officer (EWO)," PMOS 7318 created effective 9 Oct 2020; Officers holding former PMOS 7315 may convert to PMOS 7318 by HQMC DC AVN approval.) - LtCol–2ndLt
- 7318 VMU MQ-9 Officer - LtCol–2ndLt
- 7380 Tactical Systems Officer/Mission Specialist

== 75 Pilots/Naval Flight Officers (All MOS in this OccFld are not available to Warrant/ Chief Warrant Officers) ==
Officer

- ~~7500 Pilot VMA, FRS Basic A-4M (MOS deleted before 1 Oct. 2013)~~
- ~~7501 Pilot VMA, A-4 Qualified (MOS deleted before 1 Oct. 2013)~~
- 7502 Forward Air Controller/Air Officer (FMOS (Note: FMOS 7502 assigned only as non-PMOS to PMOS 75XX-qualified naval aviators and naval flight officers upon completion of Amphibious TACP Course.)) - Col–2ndLt
- 7503 Billet Designator - Fixed-Wing Pilot (Note: MOS added new 1 Oct 2012.) (FMOS) - LtCol–2ndLt
- 7504 Billet Designator - Naval Flight Officer (FMOS) - LtCol–2ndLt
- 7505 Billet Designator - Helicopter Pilot (FMOS) - LtCol–2ndLt
- 7506 Billet Designator - Any Pilot/Naval Flight Officer (FMOS) - LtCol–2ndLt
- 7507 Pilot VMA, FRS Basic AV-8B Pilot
- ~~7508 Pilot VMA, AV-8A/C Qualified (MOS deleted 1 Oct. 2012)~~
- 7509 Pilot VMA, AV-8B Qualified
- ~~7510 Pilot VMA (AW), A-6E FRS Basic (MOS deleted 1 Oct. 2013)~~
- 7511 Pilot Helicopter CH53K (NMOS 7566) - LtCol–2ndLt ~~(Formerly Pilot VMA (AW), A-6E Qualified, MOS deleted 1 Oct. 2013)~~
- 7513 Pilot, Helicopter, AH-1Z/UH-1Y (NMOS 7563, 7565) - LtCol–2ndLt
- 7516 Pilot VMFA, FRS Basic F-35B Pilot - LtCol–2ndLt
- 7517 VH-92/71, Presidential Helicopter Pilot (NMOS "Any PMOS 756X," 7532) - Col-Capt
- 7518 Pilot VMFA, F-35B Qualified
- 7521 Pilot VMFA, F/A-18 FRS Basic
- ~~7522 Pilot VMFA, F-4S Qualified (MOS deleted 1 Oct. 2013)~~
- 7523 Pilot VMFA, F/A-18 Qualified
- 7524 Naval Flight Officer (NFO) Weapons Systems Officer (WSO), F/A-18D FRS Basic
- 7525 Naval Flight Officer (NFO) Weapons Systems Officer (WSO), F/A-18D Qualified
- ~~7527 Pilot VMFA, F/A-18D Qualified (NMOS 7523) (MOS merged with MOS 7523, deleted 1 Oct. 2012)~~
- 7531 Pilot VMM, V-22 FRS Basic
- 7532 Pilot VMM, V-22 Qualified
- 7533 Aircraft Section Lead (SL) (NMOS (Note: NMOS/FMOS prerequisites any PMOS from OccFld 75XX and 8042.)) - Col–2ndLt
- 7534 Aircraft Division Lead (DL) Qualification (NMOS) - Col–2ndLt
- 7535 Flight Leader (FL) Qualification (NMOS (Note: NMOS 7535 prerequisites PMOS 7532, 7563, 7565, 7566, or 8042.)) - Col–2ndLt
- 7536 AV-8B Weapons Training Officer (WTO) Qualification (NMOS 7509, 8042) - Col–2ndLt
- 7537 Marines Division Tactics Course (MDTC) Qualification (NMOS 7518, 7523, 7525, 8042) - Col–2ndLt
- 7538 EA-6B Defensive Tactics Instructor (DEFTACTI) Qualification (NMOS 7543, 7588, 8042) - Col–2ndLt
- 7539 AV-8B Air Combat Tactics Instructor (ACTI) Qualification (NMOS 7509, 8042) - Col–2ndLt
- ~~7541 Pilot VMAQ, EA-6B FRS Basic (MOS deleted 1 Oct. 2013)~~
- ~~7542 Strike Fighter Tactics Instructor (NMOS 7518, 7523, 7525) (Previously redesignated after 1 Oct 2012 from "PMOS 7542 Pilot VMAQ/VMFP, EA-6A Qualified") - Col–2ndLt~~
- 7543 Pilot VMAQ, EA-6B Qualified
- 7544 Forward Air Controller (Airborne) Instructor (FAC(A)I) Qualification (NMOS (Note: NMOS 7544 prerequisites PMOS 7509, 7518, 7523, 7525, 7563, 7565, or 8042.)) - Col–2ndLt
- ~~7545 Pilot VMAQ/VMFP, RF-4B Qualified (MOS deleted prior to 1 Oct. 2013)~~
- 7547 Night Systems Instructor (NSI) Qualification (NMOS) - Col–2ndLt
- ~~7550 Pilot VMGR, Maritime Advance (NATC) - LtCol–2ndLt (MOS deleted after 1 Oct. 2012)~~
- 7551 Pilot VMR, C-9 Qualified (FMOS) - LtCol–2ndLt
- ~~7552 Pilot VMR, TC-4C Qualified (MOS deleted prior to 1 Oct. 2013)~~
- 7553 Pilot, VMR C-20/C-37 Qualified (FMOS) - LtCol–2ndLt
- 7554 Pilot VMR, UC-35 Qualified (FMOS) - LtCol–2ndLt
- 7555 Pilot VMR, UC-12B Qualified (FMOS) - LtCol–2ndLt
- 7556 Pilot VMGR, KC-130 Co-Pilot (T2P/T3P)
- 7557 Pilot VMGR, KC-130 Aircraft Commander
- ~~7558 Pilot HMH/M/L/A, FRS Basic CH-53D - LtCol–2ndLt (PMOS deleted 1 Oct. 2012)~~
- ~~7559 Pilot VMGR/VT, CT-39 Qualified (FMOS) (MOS deleted prior to 1 Oct. 2013) - LtCol–2ndLt~~
- 7560 Pilot HMH, FRS Basic/CH-53E Pilot
- ~~7561 Pilot HMH/M/L/A, CH-46 FRS Basic (MOS deleted 1 Oct 2016)~~
- 7562 Pilot HML/M/L/A, CH-46 Qualified
- 7563 Pilot HMLA, UH-1Y Qualified
- 7564 Pilot HMH, CH-53 A/D Qualified
- 7565 Pilot HMLA, AH-1 Qualified
- 7566 Pilot HMH, CH-53E Qualified
- 7567 Pilot HMLA, FRS Basic UH-1Y
- 7568 Pilot HMLA, FRS Basic AH-1
- 7570 VH-60N Presidential Helicopter Pilot Qualified (NMOS (Note: NMOS prerequisites PMOS 7532, 7562, 7563, 7564, 7565, 7566, or 8042.)) - Col–2ndLt
- 7571 VH-3D Presidential Helicopter Pilot Qualified (NMOS) - Col–2ndLt
- 7573 Strategic Refueling Area Commander (STRATRAC) (NMOS 7557, 8042) - Col–2ndLt
- ~~7574 Qualified Supporting Arms Coordinator (Airborne) (MOS deleted prior to 1 Oct. 2013)~~
- ~~7576 Pilot VMO (MOS deleted prior to 1 Oct. 2013)~~
- 7577 Weapons and Tactics Instructor (FMOS) - Col–2ndLt
- 7578 Naval Flight Officer, (NFO) Student (TBS)
- 7580 Naval Flight Officer, (NFO) Tactical Navigator Flight Student (NATC)
- 7582 Naval Flight Officer, (NFO) FRS Basic EA-6B Electronic Warfare Officer
- ~~7583 Bombardier/Navigator, A-6E Qualified (MOS deleted prior to 1 Oct. 2013)~~
- ~~7584 Electronic Warfare Officer (EWO), EA-6A Qualified (MOS deleted prior to 1 Oct. 2013)~~
- ~~7585 Airborne Reconnaissance Officer, (ARO) Qualified RF-4B (MOS deleted prior to 1 Oct. 2013)~~
- ~~7587 Radar Intercept Officer (RIO), F-4S (MOS deleted prior to 1 Oct. 2013)~~
- 7588 Naval Flight Officer (NFO) Qualified EA-6B Electronic Warfare Officer
- ~~7589 V/STOL Landing Signal Officer (LSO) (MOS merged into FMOS 7594 prior to 1 Oct. 2013)~~
- ~~7590 Landing Signal Officer Trainee (MOS merged into FMOS 7594 prior to 1 Oct. 2013)~~
- ~~7591 Naval Flight Officer (VMAW) (MOS redesignated to FMOS 7504 prior to 1 Oct. 2013)~~
- ~~7592 Pilot VMAW (MOS deleted prior to 1 Oct. 2013)~~
- ~~7593 Landing Signal Officer, Phase I/II Qualified (MOS merged into FMOS 7594 after to 1 Oct. 2013)~~
- 7594 Landing Signal Officer (FMOS (Note: FMOS 7594 formerly designated "Landing Signal Officer, Phase III Qualified." Former MOS 7589, 7590 and 7593 merged with FMOS 7594 prior to 1 Oct. 2013. FMOS prerequisites are qualified OccFld 75XX pilots.)) - LtCol–2ndLt
- 7595 Test Pilot/Flight Test Project Officer (FMOS) - Col–2ndLt
- 7596 Aviation Safety Officer (FMOS) - Col–2ndLt
- 7597 Pilot, Basic Rotary Wing (Note: "Basic pilots" are newly designated naval aviators who are not yet combat capable in a specific USMC aircraft.)
- 7598 Pilot, Basic Fixed Wing
- 7599 Flight Student Basic MOS

== 80 Miscellaneous MOSs (Category II) ==
Officer

- 8001 Basic Officer Basic MOS
- 8002 Joint Terminal Attack Controller (EMOS 0302, 0802, 1802, or 1803)
- 8003 General Officer (PMOS) – Gen-BGen
- 8005 Special Assignment Officer (FMOS)
- 8006 Billet Designator—Unrestricted Officer (FMOS) - Col-Capt
- 8007 Billet Designator—Unrestricted Ground Officer (FMOS) - Col-Capt
- 8009 Billet Designator—Air Control/Anti-Air Warfare Officer (FMOS)
- 8010 Billet Designator-Warrant Officer (FMOS)
- 8012 Ground Safety Officer (FMOS)
- 8016 Special Technical Operations Officer (FMOS) - Col–2ndLt
- 8017 Billet Designator-OIE Officer (EMOS) - LtCol-Capt (New as of 1 Oct 2022)
- 8018 Congressional Marine Liaison - Col-1stLt
- 8023 Parachutist Officer (NMOS) - Gen-2ndLt & CWO5-WO
- 8024 Combatant Diver Officer (NMOS) - Gen-2ndLt
- 8026 Parachutist/Combatant Diver Officer (NMOS) - Gen-2ndLt
- 8040 Colonel, Logistician (PMOS) – Col
- 8041 Colonel, Ground (PMOS) – Col
- 8042 Colonel, Naval Aviator/Naval Flight Officer (PMOS) – Col
- 8051 Operations Research Specialist (FMOS)
- 8055 Information Management Officer (IMO) (FMOS)
- 8056 Hazardous Material/Hazardous Waste (HM/HW) Officer (FMOS) - Capt-2ndLt
- 8057 Acquisition Professional Candidate (FMOS (Note: FMOS 8057 assigned only to unrestricted officers; FMOS 8058 to Majors and above; FMOS 8060 to LDO's, warrant officers, and enlisted.))
- 8058 Acquisition Manager/Acquisition Core Member (FMOS)
- 8059 Aviation Acquisition Management Professional (PMOS) – MajGen-Maj
- 8060 Acquisition Specialist (FMOS)
- 8061 Acquisition Management Professional (PMOS) – MajGen-Maj
- 8077 Weapons And Tactics Instructor (WTI) (FMOS) (FMOS) - LtCol-Capt
- 8111 Combat Rubber Reconnaissance Craft Coxswain - SSgt-PFC
- 8220 Billet Designator—Political Military Officer (FMOS*) - Col–2ndLt
- 8221 Regional Affairs Officer, Latin America (FMOS) - Col–2ndLt
- 8222 Regional Affairs Officer, Eurasia (FMOS) - Col–2ndLt (Redesignated from FMOS 8222 "Former Soviet Union" prior to 1 Oct 2012.)
- 8223 Regional Affairs Officer, People's Republic of China (FMOS) - Col–2ndLt (Redesignated from FMOS 8223 "Northeast Asia" prior to 1 Oct 2012.)
- 8224 Regional Affairs Officer, Middle East/North Africa (FMOS) - Col–2ndLt
- 8225 Regional Affairs Officer, Sub-Saharan Africa (FMOS) - Col–2ndLt
- 8226 Regional Affairs Officer, South Asia (FMOS) - Col–2ndLt
- 8227 Regional Affairs Officer, Western Europe (FMOS) - Col–2ndLt
- 8228 Regional Affairs Officer, East Asia (Excluding People's Republic of China) (FMOS) - Col–2ndLt
- 8229 Regional Affairs Officer, Eastern Europe (Excluding Former Soviet Union) (FMOS) - Col–2ndLt
- 8240 Basic Foreign Area Officer (FAO) (FMOS) - Col–2ndLt
- 8241 Foreign Area Officer, Latin America (FMOS) - Col–2ndLt
- 8242 Foreign Area Officer, Eurasia (FMOS) - Col–2ndLt (Redesignated from FMOS 8242 "Former Soviet Union" prior to 1 Oct 2012.)
- 8243 Foreign Area Officer, People's Republic of China (PRC) (FMOS) - Col–2ndLt
- 8244 Foreign Area Officer, Middle East/North Africa (FMOS) - Col–2ndLt
- 8245 Foreign Area Officer, Sub-Saharan Africa (FMOS) - Col–2ndLt
- 8246 Foreign Area Officer, South Asia (FMOS) - Col–2ndLt
- 8247 Foreign Area Officer, Western Europe (FMOS) - Col–2ndLt
- 8248 Foreign Area Officer, East Asia (Excluding People's Republic of China) (FMOS) - Col–2ndLt
- 8249 Foreign Area Officer, Eastern Europe (Excluding Former Soviet Union) (FMOS) - Col–2ndLt
- 8404 - Field Medical Service Technician
- 8640 Requirements Manager (FMOS) - LtCol-Capt & CWO5-CWO2
- 8641 Microminature Repairer - MGySgt-LCpl
- 8802 Training and Education Officer (Note: Redesignated from "Education Officer" 1 Oct 2012.) (FMOS)
- 8803 Leadership Development Specialist (FMOS)
- 8820 Aeronautical Engineer (FMOS)
- 8824 Electronics Engineer (FMOS)
- 8825 Modeling and Simulation Officer (FMOS)
- 8826 Ordnance Systems Engineer (FMOS)
- 8831 Environmental Engineering Management Officer (FMOS)
- 8832 Nuclear Engineer (FMOS)
- 8834 Technical Information Operations Officer (FMOS)
- 8840 Manpower Management Officer (FMOS)
- 8844 Financial Management Specialist (FMOS)
- 8846 Data Systems Specialist (FMOS)
- 8848 Management, Data Systems Officer (FMOS)
- 8850 Operations Analyst (FMOS)
- 8852 Defense Systems Analyst (FMOS)
- 8858 Command, Control, Communications, Computers and Intelligence (C4I) (FMOS)
- 8862 Material Management Officer (FMOS)
- 8866 Space Plans Officer (FMOS) - LtCol–2ndLt
- 8878 Historian (FMOS)

Enlisted

- 8000 General Service Marine (BASIC MOS) – MGySgt–Pvt
- 8002 Joint Terminal Attack Controller (FMOS) (Note: EMOS 8002 prerequisites include MOS 0321 or 0861.) – MGySgt–Sgt
- 8011 Basic Marine with Enlistment Guarantee (BASIC MOS) – MGySgt–Pvt
- 8012 Ground Safety Officer (Enlisted FMOS) – MSgt–SSgt (renamed from Ground Safety Specialist prior to April 2017)
- 8013 Special Assignment—Enlisted (FMOS) – MGySgt–Pvt
- 8014 Billet Designator—Enlisted (FMOS*) – MGySgt–Pvt
- 8015 College Degree—Enlisted (EMOS) – MGySgt–Pvt
- 8016 Special Technical (STO) Administrator (Enlisted FMOS) – MGySgt–Sgt (renamed from Special Technical (STO) Planner as of April 2017)
- 8018 Congressional Marine Liaison - MGySgt-Sgt
- 8022 Reaper (MQ-9) Sensor Operator - MGySgt-Pvt
- 8023 Parachutist (Enlisted) (NMOS) – SgtMaj-Pvt
- 8024 Combatant Diver Marine (Enlisted) (NMOS) – SgtMaj/MGySgt–Pvt
- 8026 Parachutist/Combatant Diver Marine (NMOS) – SgtMaj/MGySgt–Pvt
- 8028 MECEP Participant (FMOS) – MGySgt–Pvt
- 8033 Quality Assurance Technician (Subsistence)
- 8056 Hazardous Material/Hazardous Waste Staff NCO/NCO (FMOS) – MGySgt–LCpl
- 8060 Acquisition Specialist (Enlisted) (FMOS) – MGySgt–SSgt
- 8071 Special Operations Capabilities Specialist (SOCS) (NMOS) – MGySgt–Sgt
- 8111 Combat Rubber Reconnaissance Craft (CRRC) Coxswain - SSgt-PFC
- 8112 Riverine Assault Craft (RAC) Crewman - GySgt-PFC
- 8114 Rigid Raiding Craft (RRC)/Rigid Hull Inflatable Boat (RHIB) Coxswain - SSgt-PFC
- 8151 Billet Designator—Guard (FMOS*) – GySgt–Pvt
- 8152 Billet Designator—Marine Corps Security Force (MCSF) Guard (EMOS) – GySgt–Pvt
- 8153 Billet Designator—Marine Corps Security Force (MCSF) Cadre Trainer (EMOS) – GySgt–Cpl
- 8154 Billet Designator—Marine Corps Security Force Close Quarters Battle (CQB) Team Member (FMOS*) – SSgt–LCpl
- 8156 Marine Security Guard (MSG) (FMOS) – MGySgt–PFC
- 8230 Foreign Area Staff Non-Commissioned Officer Basic/In-Training Foreign Area SNCO - SgtMajor-SSgt
- 8231 Education Assistant - GySgt-Pvt
- 8411 Recruiter (EMOS) – GySgt–Sgt
- 8412 Career Recruiter (PMOS) – MGySgt–GySgt
- 8421 Production Recruiter - Sgt
- 8422 Career Prior Service Recruiter - MGySgt-SSgt
- 8431 Psychological Operations Noncommissioned Officer - GySgt-Cpl
- 8511 Drill Instructor - SgtMaj/MGySgt-Sgt
- 8513 Marine Combat Instructor - GySgt-Cpl
- 8530 Marksmanship Coach - Sgt-PFC
- 8531 Billet Designator—Marksmanship Instructor - MGySgt-Sgt
- 8532 Small Arms Weapons Instructor - MGySgt-Sgt
- 8534 Equal Opportunity Advisor (EOA) - MGySgt-SSgt
- 8538 Substance Abuse Counselor - MGySgt-Sgt
- 8541 Surveillance, Target Acquisition and Night Observation (STANO); Surveillance and Target Acquisition (STA); ie. Scout Sniper - GySgt-LCpl
- 8552 Martial Arts Instructor - MGySgt-Cpl
- 8552 Martial Arts Instructor-Trainer - MGySgt-Sgt
- 8563 Water Safety/Survival Instructor - MGySgt-Pvt
- 8611 Interpreter (Designated Language) - MGySgt-Pvt
- 8621 Surveillance Sensor Operator (NMOS) – MSgt–Pvt
- 8623 Small Unmanned Aircraft System Specialist (FMOS) – MGySgt-LCpl
- 8640 Requirements Manager (FMOS) – MGySgt-SSgt (new FMOS as of May 2018)
- 8641 Microminiature Repairer (NMOS 21XX, 28XX, 59XX) – GySgt–LCpl
- 8652 Reconnaissance Man, Parachute Qualified - SgtMaj/MGySgt-Pvt
- 8653 Reconnaissance Man, Combatant Diver Qualified - SgtMaj/MGySgt-Pvt
- 8654 Reconnaissance Man, Parachute and Combatant Diver Qualified - SgtMaj/MGySgt-Pvt
- 8711 Ground Command and Control (C2) Operations NCO (EMOS) (Note: EMOS 8711 prerequisites include MOS 0311, 0313, 0321, 0331, 0341, 0351, 0352, 0363, 0365, 0369, 0811, 0842, 0844, 0847, 0848, 0861, 0842, 1833, or 4341.) – Sgt–LCpl (formerly Ground Operations Specialist)
- 8713 Ground Operations Specialist (EMOS) (Note: EMOS 8713 prerequisites include MOS 0321, 0363, 0369, 0811, 0848, 0861, 1833, or 4341.) – GySgt to SSgt (new EMOS as of April 2017)
- ~~8811 Firefighter (FMOS)~~ – GySgt–Pvt (FMOS deleted after 2005 and prior to April 2017)
- 8910 GCE Marine (FMOS) – MGySgt–Pvt
- 8911 Billet Designator—Barracks and Grounds Marine (FMOS*) – GySgt–Pvt
- 8915 Billet Designator—Food Service Attendant - LCpl-Pvt
- 8921 Billet Designator—Athletic and Recreation Assistant - MGySgt-Pvt
- 8972 Aircrew Trainee (PMOS) (Note: Aircrew Trainees, under instruction or close supervision, train for one of the aircrew MOSs, and must already be qualified in one of MOSs 6XXX and 73XX. Their original PMOS will be retained in service records as an Additional MOS.) – GySgt-Pvt
- 8991 Sergeant Major of the Marine Corps (PMOS) – SgtMaj
- 8999 Sergeant Major/First Sergeant (PMOS) – SgtMaj and 1stSgt

== 90 Identifying and Reporting MOSs (Category III) ==
Enlisted

- 9051 Graves Registration Specialist - MGySgt-Cpl
- ~~9811 Member, The President's Own, United States Marine Band - MGySgt-SSgt~~
- ~~9812 Member, "The Commandant's Own," U.S. Marine Drum & Bugle Corps - MGySgt-Pvt~~
- 9900 General Service Marine - MGySgt-Pvt
- 9915 Special Assignment—Enlisted - MGySgt-Pvt
- 9916 Billet Designator—Enlisted - MGySgt-Pvt
- 9917 College Degree—Enlisted - MGySgt-Pvt
- 9928 MECEP Participant - MGySgt-Pvt
- 9935 Special Technical Operations - MGySgt-Pvt
- 9936 Substance Abuse Control Specialist - MGySgt-SSgt
- 9952 Combatant Diver Marine - SgtMaj/MGySgt-Pvt
- 9953 Parachutist/Combatant Diver Marine - SgtMaj/MGySgt-Pvt
- 9954 Hazardous Material/Hazardous Waste (HM/HW) Staff Noncommissioned Officer/Noncommissioned Officer - MGySgt-LCpl
- 9956 Ground Safety Specialist - GySGt-Pvt
- 9960 Acquisition Specialist - MGySgt-SSgt
- 9962 Parachutist - SgtMaj/MGySgt-Pvt
- 9971 Basic Marine with Enlistment Guarantee - MGySgt-Pvt
- 9972 Aircrew Trainee - GySgt-Pvt
- 9973 Fixed-Wing Transport Aircraft Specialist, KC-130J - MGySgt-Pvt
- 9974 Vertical Takeoff Unmanned Aerial Vehicle Specialist - MGySgt-Pvt
- 9976 Helicopter Specialist, AH-1Z/UH-1Y - MGySgt-Pvt
- 9986 Joint Terminal Attack Controller - MGySgt-SSgt
- 9991 Sergeant Major of the Marine Corps - SgtMaj
- 9999 Sergeant Major-First Sergeant - SgtMaj-1stSgt

Officer

- 9666 Space Operations Officer
- 9701 Joint Specialty Officer Nominee (FMOS) – Col-Capt
- 9702 Joint Specialty Officer (JSO) (FMOS) (Note: Formerly Joint Qualified Officer (JSO). The JQO and JSO Nominee MOS will never appear as a primary or additional MOS; once assigned, it is retained in the Marine's service records indefinitely and is found in the special information block on the Master Brief Sheet on the Basic Individual Record.) – Col-Maj
- ~~9860 Human Resources Management Officer (FMOS)~~ (redesignated FMOS 8840, Manpower Management Officer)
- 9934 Information Operations Staff Officer
- 9957 Acquisition Professional Candidate
- 9958 Acquisition Management/Acquisition Core Member
- 9959 Acquisition Management Professional
- 9986 Joint Terminal Attack Controller

== See also ==
- Air Force Specialty Code
- Badges of the United States Marine Corps
- Headquarters Marine Corps
- List of United States Army careers
- List of United States Coast Guard ratings
- List of United States Naval officer designators
- List of United States Navy ratings
- List of United States Navy staff corps
- Organization of the United States Marine Corps
