= Ground Intelligence Officer =

U.S. Marine Corps officer speciality

Ground Intelligence Officer (MOS 0203) is a primary military occupation code (or MOS) of a U.S. Marine Corps intelligence officer. Ground intelligence officers serve as staff officers and commanders in the operating forces and are responsible for analyzing intelligence and planning, deployment and tactical employment of ground surveillance and reconnaissance units. The Ground Intelligence Officer can be a Recon Marine after their training is done.

== Preliminary requirements ==
Before anyone can be accepted for Ground Intelligence (or Ground Intel), a candidate must fulfill the following prerequisites:

- Must be a U.S. citizen.
- Must be eligible for a top-secret security clearance and access to Sensitive Compartmented Information (SCI), predicated upon a Single Scope Background Investigation (SSBI). An application for the SSBI must be submitted prior to attendance of the Ground Intelligence Officers Course at NMITC, Dam Neck, Virginia.
- Must be a lieutenant to be assigned this MOS as a primary MOS. Officers assigned this MOS will retain it as an additional MOS following completion of the MAGTF Intelligence Officer Course and re-designation as a 0202 MAGTF Intelligence Officer.

This field was opened to female Marine officers in October 2013, with a date effective June 2013, but as yet no female has met the prerequisite training to be eligible.

== Training ==
A Marine Corps Officer takes three more courses before he becomes an Intel Officer after graduating from The Basic School. Entry-level Marine Intelligence Officers receive specific training at the following courses: Infantry Officer's Course (IOC), Scout Sniper Unit Leader's Course (SSULC), and the Ground Intelligence Officer's Course (GIOC). The following courses of instruction are desirable as skills progression courses for MOS 0203:

- Survival, Evasion, Resistance and Escape (SERE) course
- Intel Collection Management Course, Washington, DC
- Foreign Weapons Instructor Course (FWIC), Quantico, VA
- Combat Targeting Course, Goodfellow Air Force Base, Texas
- Indications and Warnings Course, Washington, DC
- Intelligence Analyst Course, Washington, DC
- Basic Reconnaissance Course (BRC)

Upon completion of this school pipeline, the Lt. is assigned to a recon, sniper or other ground intelligence unit. He may also serve as the assistant intelligence officer at a regular infantry battalion. He then would serve as commander of the reconnaissance companies within the reconnaissance battalions.

== Advanced training ==
When slots become available and the FMF budget permits it, the Recon Marines commander may attend other advanced courses from cross-service schools. Here are the following schools that are attended, if available:

- Marine Corps Combatant Diver Course — Navy Diving Salvage and Training Center, Naval Support Activity Panama City, Florida
- Survival, Evasion, Resistance and Escape School — Navy Remote Training Sites; NAS North Island, California or NAS Brunswick, Maine
- Army Airborne School — Fort Benning, Georgia
- United States Army Static Line Jumpmaster School (Fort Benning, Georgia)
- United States Army Ranger School (Fort Benning, Georgia)
- Special Operations Training Group Schools (i.e. Urban Sniper, HRST, etc.) (SOTG) — One SOTG exists under each MEF; I MEF, II MEF, and III MEF.
- Recon and Surveillance Leaders Course — Ranger School, Fort Benning, Georgia
- Pathfinder Course — Army Infantry School, Fort Benning, or Army Air Assault School, Fort Campbell, Kentucky
- Military Free Fall (John F. Kennedy Special Warfare Center) / Multi Mission Parachutist Course (CPS Coolidge, Arizona)
- Military Free Fall (Jumpmaster) School — John F. Kennedy Special Warfare Center and School
- Mountain Leaders (Summer/Winter) Course — Pickle Meadows, CA
- Scout Sniper Course — School of Infantry (West), Camp Pendleton, California; Camp Lejeune, North Carolina; Quantico, Virginia; or MCB Hawaii
- Mountain Sniper (Bridgeport, California)
- Reconnaissance Team Leader Course (Camp Pendleton, California)
- Scout/Sniper Team Leader Course
- Methods of Entry / Breacher (MCB Quantico, Virginia)
- Joint Terminal Attack Controller (Expeditionary Warfare Training Group Atlantic/Pacific)
- High Risk Personnel (HRP) Course — MCB Quantico

== Mission ==
Ground intelligence officers play a crucial role as primary platoon commanders in various units, including division reconnaissance companies and infantry battalion scout/sniper platoons. They are also assigned to key positions within battalion, regiment, and division staffs, as well as intelligence battalions and force service support groups. In these roles, they oversee the deployment and tactical employment of ground reconnaissance units, ensuring they are effectively utilized on the battlefield.

Responsibilities of ground intelligence officers include analyzing and evaluating intelligence, estimating operational situations, and formulating and executing plans for offensive and defensive maneuvers, reconnaissance, fire support, and more. They are also responsible for the discipline and welfare of their unit's Marines.

Typically, recon platoon commanders operate from the Landing Force Operations Center or Combat Operations Center, where they receive reports from their teams, transmit directions, and coordinate necessary support for field operations. Recon team leaders, often sergeants or staff sergeants, lead teams in the field on missions, with some missions requiring the entire platoon to act as a cohesive unit. In such cases, the platoon commander may also join the team in the field.

== See also ==
- MARSOC—Marine Special Operations Command
- Marine Corps Intelligence Activity
- Semper Fidelis
- Special Activities Division
