= MOS 0261 =

US Marine Corps occupation code

MOS 0261 is the United States Marine Corps (USMC) Military Occupational Specialty (MOS) code for Geospatial Intelligence Specialist. It is an entry-level MOS.

== General information ==
MOS 0261, Geospatial Intelligence Specialist (formerly Geographic Intelligence Specialist) is an entry-level primary MOS. Geospatial intelligence specialists collect, analyze, process, and disseminate geophysical data. They perform precision ground control survey operations to provide the positional data required for various weapons delivery and C3 systems, construct and revise military maps and charts, conduct geodetic, topographic, and hydrographic survey operations, and analyze terrain and hydrography as a functional aspect of military intelligence. Equipment utilized includes survey and mapping instrumentation such as the theodolites, electronic and satellite positioning equipment, and microcomputer based mapping equipment.

== Training ==
Training for this MOS was conducted at the National Geospatial-Intelligence College at the National Geospatial-Intelligence Agency (NGA) Campus East in Springfield, Virginia, but is now conducted at Dam Neck, VA. The training period is approximately 7 months.
