= Deaths in September 1989 =

The following is a list of notable deaths in September 1989.

Entries for each day are listed alphabetically by surname. A typical entry lists information in the following sequence:

- Name, age, country of citizenship at birth, subsequent country of citizenship (if applicable), reason for notability, cause of death (if known), and reference.

== September 1989 ==
=== 1 ===
- Kevin Andrews, 65, American archaeologist and writer, drowned.
- Paul Chung, 30, Hong Kong actor, suicide.
- Kazimierz Deyna, 41, Polish international footballer (Legia Warsaw, Poland), car accident.
- Bart Giamatti, 51, American Commissioner of Major League Baseball, heart attack.
- Cyril Gill, 87, British Olympic sprinter (1928).
- Dipa Ma, 78, Indian meditation teacher.
- Albert Outler, 80, American Methodist historian and pastor, stroke.
- Shah Azizur Rahman, 63, Bangladeshi politician, Prime Minister of Bangladesh.
- Leslie Runciman, 89, British shipping magnate.
- Tadeusz Sendzimir, 95, Polish engineer and inventor, stroke.
- Yevgeny Veltistov, 55, Soviet writer and screenwriter.

=== 2 ===
- Clifton Parker, 84, British composer.
- Brian Robinson, appr. 27, Northern Ireland loyalist militant (Ulster Volunteer Force), shot.

=== 3 ===
- John Augustine Collins, 90, Royal Australian Navy vice admiral, Chief of Navy.
- Augie Lio, 71, American NFL footballer (Detroit Lions).
- Sten Mellgren, 89, Swedish Olympic footballer (1924).
- Gaetano Scirea, 36, Italian international footballer (Juventus, Italy), car accident.
- Rip Sewell, 82, American Major League baseball player (Pittsburgh Pirates).
- Meena Shorey, 67, Pakistani film actress (Ek Thi Larki).

=== 4 ===
- Gastón Cibert, 71, Argentine Olympic sailor (1948).
- Colin Clark, 83, British and Australian economist and statistician (gross national product).
- Zenon Kliszko, 80, Polish politician.
- Hal Lee, 84, American MLB player (Brooklyn Robins, Philadelphia Phillies, Boston Braves/Bees).
- Carl-August von Schoenebeck, 91, Nazi German general in the Luftwaffe.
- Georges Simenon, 86, Belgian writer (Jules Maigret), complications from a fall.
- Sir Ronald Syme, 86, New Zealand–born British classicist and historian (The Roman Revolution).

=== 5 ===
- Les Allen, 78, Australian rules footballer.
- Sir Philip Baxter, 84, British and Australian chemical engineer, chairman of the Australian Atomic Energy Commission.
- Michael Fidler, 73, British politician, Member of Parliament.
- William Mann, 65, English music critic, complications from surgery.
- J. Barkley Rosser, 81, American logician (Church–Rosser theorem), aneurysm.

=== 6 ===
- Jessie Mae Brown Beavers, 66, American journalist.
- Edwin Arthur Burtt, 96, American philosopher.
- Imre Hennyei, 76, Hungarian Olympic fencer (1948, 1952).
- Mick Higgins, 78, Australian rules footballer.
- Muhammad Ibrahim, 77, Bangladeshi physician.
- Gina Manès, 96, French film actress.
- Stephen Nankervis, 99, Australian rules footballer.
- Héctor Ricardo, 64, Argentine footballer.
- Jimmy Ruffell, 89, English international footballer (West Ham United, England).

=== 7 ===
- Tom Blackaller, 49, American yachtsman, World Championship gold medalist, heart attack.
- Valery Goborov, 23, Soviet basketball player, Olympic gold medalist (1988), car crash.
- Mikhail Goldstein, 71, German composer and violinist.
- Joseph McCann, 63, Australian Olympic diver (1956).

=== 8 ===
- Frederic L. Chapin, 60, American diplomat, ambassador to Ethiopia, Guatemala and Chad, cancer.
- Keef Cowboy, 28, American rapper, invented term "hip hop", drug overdose.
- Henri Disy, 76, Belgian Olympic water polo player (1936).
- Ann George, 86, English actress (Crossroads), cancer.
- Aleardo Simoni, 87, Italian cyclist.
- Paul Alfred Weiss, 91, Austrian and American biologist.

=== 9 ===
- Elephter Andronikashvili, 78, Georgian physicist.
- Heinrich Angst, 73, Swiss Olympic bobsledder (1948, 1956).
- Christopher Chancellor, 85, British journalist, general manager of Reuters.
- Radharani Devi, 85, Indian poet.
- Oleksiy Fedorov, 88, Soviet army general, Hero of the Soviet Union.
- Josette Frank, 96, American children's literature expert, pneumonia.
- Tim Hovey, 44, American child actor, road manager of Grateful Dead, suicide.
- Vince Hughes, 83, Australian rugby league footballer.
- John McShain, 92, American building contractor, "The Man Who Built Washington", stroke.

=== 10 ===
- Okie Blanchard, 86, American college football player and coach (Wyoming Cowboys).
- Dutch Elston, 70, American football player and coach.
- Charles H. Griffin, 63, American politician, member of the United States House of Representatives (1968-1973).
- Jeff Stollmeyer, 68, Trinidad and Tobago test cricketer and captain (West Indies) and senator, wounds from home invaders.

=== 11 ===
- Lucy Carnegie Ferguson, 89, American preservationist (Cumberland Island).
- Paul Gann, 77, American political activist, pneumonia.
- Norman Goff, 68, Australian Olympic sports shooter (1956).
- Bill Wood, 67, Australian rules footballer.

=== 12 ===
- Henry Benton, 70, Australian rugby league player.
- Josef Boháč, 75, Czechoslovak Olympic ice hockey player (1936).
- George Gniel, 70, Australian rules footballer.
- Gladys Jayawardene, Sri Lankan physician, chairman of State Pharmaceuticals Corporation of Sri Lanka, assassinated.
- John D. Landers, 69 American officer in the United States Army Air Forces.
- Anton Lubowski, 37, Namibian anti-apartheid activist and advocate, assassinated.
- Fishbait Miller, 80, American Doorkeeper of the U.S. House of Representatives, heart attack.
- Sterjo Spasse, 75, Albanian prose writer and novelist.
- Seamus Twomey, 69, Irish republican militant activist, chief of staff of the Provisional I.R.A..
- Don Walker, 81, American Broadway orchestrator and composer.

=== 13 ===
- Acharya Aatreya, 68, Indian poet, playwright and screenwriter.
- Gilles Andriamahazo, 70, Madagascan general in the French army, head of state of Madagascar, heart attack.
- Jack Baldwin, 68, American football player.
- Sir David Bartlett, 77, British Olympic fencer (1936).
- John Bunyan, 84, American NFL player (Staten Island Stapletons, Brooklyn Dodgers).
- Zoltán Dudás, 56, Hungarian Olympic footballer (1960).
- Arieh Dulzin, 76, Israeli politician.
- Géza Frid, 85, Austro-Hungarian–born Dutch composer and pianist.
- Sagarika Gomes, 27, Sri Lankan newscaster, abducted and murdered.
- Kamal Irani, 57, Pakistani film actor (Shaheed), heart attack.
- Cyril Parsloe, 80, New Zealand cricketer.
- Charles H. Russell, 85, American politician, Governor of Nevada, heart attack.
- Ron Whyte, 47, American playwright, cerebral hemorrhage.
- John Yovicsin, 70, American NFL footballer (Philadelphia Eagles), heart disease.

=== 14 ===
- John Bright, 81, American journalist, screenwriter and political activist.
- Tim Brown, 51, American figure skater, World Figure Skating Championships medalist, AIDS.
- Castor Elzo, 71, Spanish footballer.
- Eddie McLeod, 88, New Zealand cricketer.
- Marvin Middlemark, 69, American inventor of the Rabbit Ears television antenna.
- Benjamin Peary Pal, 83, Indian plant breeder and agronomist, director of the Indian Agricultural Research Institute.
- Pérez Prado, 72, Cuban bandleader and composer, popularised the mambo, stroke.
- Heinz Schmidt, 82, German journalist and editor.
- Tika Lal Taploo, 58, Indian politician, assassinated.
- Valentina, 90, Ukrainian-born American fashion designer, Parkinson's disease.
- Arnold Winkenhofer, 84, American football player and coach (Western Kentucky Hilltoppers).

=== 15 ===
- Harry Cave, 66, New Zealand test cricketer and captain (Central Districts, New Zealand).
- William C. Eddy, 87, American naval officer, engineer and inventor.
- Olga Erteszek, 73, Polish-born American lingerie designer and company owner, breast cancer.
- Jan DeGaetani, 56, American mezzo-soprano, leukemia.
- Michael Klinger, 68, British film producer and distributor.
- Robert Penn Warren, 84, American poet and novelist, prostate cancer.
- John Burr Williams, 88, American economist (intrinsic value).
- Jack Zwirewich, 60, Canadian Olympic rower (1948, 1952).

=== 16 ===
- Bruno Heck, 72, German politician (Minister of Family Affairs and Youth).
- Archie Leitch, 83, Australian rules footballer.
- Georg Schewe, Nazi German officer with the Kriegsmarine.
- Allen Shields, 62, American mathematician, (functional analysis), cancer.
- Anatoly Slivko, 50, Soviet serial killer, executed.
- Steven Stayner, 24, American kidnapping victim, motor cycle collision.
- Anthony Trafford, 57, British politician, Member of Parliament and the House of Lords, lung cancer.

=== 17 ===
- Hugh Quincy Alexander, 78, American politician, member of the U.S. House of Representatives (1953-1963).
- Leon Culberson, 70, American Major League baseball player (Boston Red Sox).
- Richard Hull, 82, British Army field marshall, Chief of the General Staff, cancer.
- Lionel Malamed, 64, American NBA basketballer (Indianapolis Jets), heart attack.
- José Martínez-Zorilla, 76, Mexican-American football player and Olympic fencer (1936).
- Ion Dezideriu Sîrbu, 70, Romanian philosopher, novelist and dramatist, esophageal cancer.
- Jay Stewart, 71, American television and radio announcer (Let's Make a Deal), suicide.
- Salvador Tió, 77, Puerto Rican poet and writer, coined the term "Spanglish".
- Don Vines, 57, Welsh rugby union and rugby league footballer (Wakefield Trinity, Great Britain).

=== 18 ===
- Alexander Fletcher, 60, Scottish politician, Member of Parliament.
- Henry K. Fluck, 77, American army officer.
- Maryat Lee, 66, American playwright and theatre director, heart disease.
- Doug Munro, 72, Australian rules footballer.
- Peter Phipps, 80, New Zealand vice admiral in the Royal New Zealand Navy, car accident.
- Aleksandra Śląska, 63, Polish film actress.
- Jack Smith, 56, American filmmaker and actor (Flaming Creatures), AIDS.

=== 19 ===
- Vera Barclay, 95, English scouting pioneer and an author.
- Raymond Holman, 70, Australian cricketer.
- Alma Lavenson, 92, American photographer.
- Philip Sayer, 42, British actor (Xtro), cancer.
- Willie Steele, 66, American long-jumper and Olympic gold medalist (1948), cancer.

=== 20 ===
- Stig Andersson-Tvilling, 61, Swedish Olympic ice hockey player (1952, 1956).
- Ruth Bailey, 76, American actress.
- Chen Boda, 85, Chinese Communist journalist and revolutionist.
- Charley Booker, 64, American blues singer and guitarist.
- Richie Ginther, 59, American race car driver, heart attack.
- Roy W. Johnson, 97, American football, basketball and baseball coach.
- David Loxton, 46, Canadian-born British and American documentary producer, pancreatic cancer.
- Tuti Indra Malaon, 49, Indonesian actress and dancer (Wadjah Seorang Laki-laki), internal bleeding.
- Gustl Müller, 85, German Olympic skier (1928).
- James Paster, 44, American serial killer, executed.
- Len Pye, 78, Australian rules footballer.

=== 21 ===
- Bill Barron, 62, American jazz tenor and soprano saxophonist.
- Garrett H. Byrne, 91, American lawyer and politician, district attorney of Suffolk County, Massachusetts.
- Murry Dickson, 73, American Major League baseball player (St. Louis Cardinals), emphysema.
- Ertem Eğilmez, 60, Turkish film director, producer and screenwriter, cancer.
- Corrado Gaipa, 64, Italian actor and voice actor (The Godfather).
- Norman Morley, 90, British Naval Reserve officer.
- Gene Nobles, 76, American radio disc jockey (WLAC).
- Mark Smerchanski, 74, Canadian politician, member of the House of Commons of Canada (1968-1972).
- Rajani Thiranagama, 35, Sri Lankan Tamil human rights activist and feminist, assassinated.

=== 22 ===
- Chuffie Alexander, 87, American Negro League baseball player.
- Ambrose Folorunsho Alli, 60, Nigerian Executive Governor of defunct Nigerian Bendel State).
- Irving Berlin, 101, Russian-born American songwriter ("Puttin' On the Ritz", "White Christmas"), heart attack.
- Bob Calihan, 71, American NBL basketballer and coach (Detroit Eagles).
- John E. Hunt, 80, American politician, member of the U.S. House of Representatives (1967-1975).
- Chunilal Madan, 76, Kenyan Chief Justice of the Supreme Court.
- Haruo Maekawa, 78, Japanese businessman, governor of the Bank of Japan.
- Irving Naxon, 87, American inventor (slow cooker).

=== 23 ===
- Sal Aunese, 21, American college football player (Colorado Buffaloes).
- Austin R. Brunelli, 82, American general in the United States Marine Corps.
- Nick Clausen, 89, Danish Olympic boxer (1920).
- Vail Jewell, 79, American Negro Leagues baseball player.
- Abu Hena Mustafa Kamal, 53, Bangladeshi songwriter and poet.
- Bradley Kincaid, 94, American folk singer and radio entertainer.
- John T. Koehler, 85, American navy commander, United States Assistant Secretary of the Navy, cancer.
- William G. Rohrer, 79, American businessman and politician, mayor of Haddon Township, New Jersey.
- Angelo Ross, 78, American film editor and sound engineer (Smokey and the Bandit).
- William Traylor, 58, American film, stage and television actor, heart attack.

=== 24 ===
- Chuck Bond, 75, American NFL player (Washington Redskins).
- Charles Hutter, 73, American Olympic swimmer (1936).
- Daniel van der Meulen, 95, Dutch diplomat
- Åke Pleijel, 76, Swedish mathematician (Minakshisundaram–Pleijel zeta function).
- Earl E. Stone, 93, American rear admiral in the United States Navy, director of the Armed Forces Security Agency.
- Shri Yogendra, 91, Indian yoga guru, author and poet.

=== 25 ===
- Pedro Amorim, 69, Brazilian footballer.
- Wally Floody, 71, Canadian fighter pilot and prisoner of war ("Great Escape").
- Darlington Hoopes, 93, American politician and lawyer, member of Pennsylvania House of Representatives.
- Nowell Myres, 86, British archaeologist, Bodley's Librarian.

=== 26 ===
- Pavlos Bakoyannis, 54, Greek politician, assassinated.
- Jimmy Delaney, 75, Scottish international footballer (Manchester United, Celtic, Scotland).
- Kaj Franck, 77, Finnish designer and applied artist.
- Leo Gottlieb, 93, American lawyer (Cleary Gottlieb Steen & Hamilton).
- Hemant Kumar, 69, Indian music director and playback singer, heart attack.
- William Post Jr., 88, American actor, pulmonary disease.

=== 27 ===
- Sergie Sovoroff, 88, American Aleut educational leader.

=== 28 ===
- José Arribas, 68, Spanish professional footballer and manager (Le Mans).
- Gerardo Castañeda, 63, Guatemalan Olympic sports shooter (1968).
- Ferdinand Marcos, 72, Filipino dictator, politician and statesman, President of the Philippines, cardiac arrest.
- Evan McCaskey, 24, American guitarist (Exodus, Blind Illusion), suicide.
- Paul Schaeffer, 77, American NHL player (Chicago Black Hawks).
- Michael F. Skerry, 80, American politician, speaker of the Massachusetts House of Representatives.
- Ronald Swain, 86, British RAF officer.

=== 29 ===
- Gussie Busch, 90, American brewing magnate (Anheuser-Busch), owner of the St. Louis Cardinals, pneumonia.
- Mark Dignam, 80, English actor.
- Paul Elzey, 43, American AFL player (Cincinnati Bengals).
- János Farkas, 47, Hungarian footballer (Vasas, Hungary) and Olympic gold medalist, heart attack.
- Ermance Rejebian, 83, Armenian-born American book reviewer, lecturer, broadcaster and writer (d. 1989)
- Geoffrey Sumner, 80, British actor.
- Adrian Swan, 59, Australian Olympic figure skater (1952).
- Jean-Louis Tixier-Vignancour, 81, French lawyer and far-right politician, member of the Chamber of Deputies, Vichy collaborator.
- Georges Ulmer, 70, Danish-born French composer and actor.
- Gunnar Wiklund, 54, Swedish singer.

=== 30 ===
- Horace Alexander, 100, English Quaker teacher, writer and ornithologist.
- Oskar Davičo, 80, Yugoslavian novelist and poet.
- Manju Dey, 63, Indian actress and director (Carey Saheber Munshi).
- William M. Fairbank, 72, American physicist (low-temperature physics), heart attack.
- Derelys Perdue, 87, American silent-screen actress and dancer.
- Huỳnh Tấn Phát, 76, Vietnamese architect and politician, Prime Minister of the Republic of Vietnam.
- Arthur Rook, 68, British Olympic equestrian (1956).
- Artur Schmitt, 78, German Olympic gymnast (1952).
- Ludwig Schuberth, 78, Austrian Olympic handball player (1936).
- Virgil Thomson, 92, American composer.
- John T. Walker, 64 American Roman Catholic leader, Bishop of Washington, heart failure.
- Roy Weir, 78, American MLB player (Boston Bees).

=== Unknown date ===
- Vittorio Scarpati, 35–36, Italian and American artist and cartoonist, AIDS.

== Sources ==
- Liebman, Roy (2000). The Wampas Baby Stars: A Biographical Dictionary, 1922–1934. Jefferson, North Carolina: McFarland. ISBN 0-7864-0756-5.
