= Nelson M. Cooke =

Nelson Magor Cooke
- Born: November 28, 1903; Davis City, Iowa, US
- Died: November 30, 1965 (aged 62); Bethesda, Maryland, US
- Military career
- Allegiance: United States
- Branch: United States Navy
- Service years: 1920–1951
- Rank: Lieutenant commander
- Awards: Commendation Medal; Medal for Humane Action
- Other work: Entrepreneur, author

Nelson Magor Cooke (28 November 1903 – 30 November 1965) was a leader in developing electronic schools of the United States Navy, the recipient of the Navy Commendation Medal and Medal for Humane Action, a post-war engineering entrepreneur, and an author of books on applied mathematics and basic electronics.

Cooke was born in Davis City, Iowa, son of Jacob and Lena Stoneburner Cook. Orphaned at 12, he was raised by relatives. He enlisted in the U.S. Navy as an apprentice seaman on 22 November 1920, and progressively rose in rank through petty officer and warrant officer to lieutenant commander before retiring on 1 May 1951. After leaving the navy, he formed and operated his own engineering firm. Cooke began professional writing in 1934, and continued with multiple-edition technical books throughout his life. He was married to Catherine Elizabeth Rice of Washington, D.C., in 1926; they had one daughter, Isabelle E. Cooke, born in 1931. Nelson Magor Cooke died of leukemia at the Bethesda Naval Hospital in November 1965; his home at that time was in Great Falls, Virginia.

== United States Navy ==
As a youth, Cooke's primary interest was in the emerging radio technology. Without funds for studying engineering at a university, he turned to the navy for obtaining a technical education and entered military service at age 16. Through on-the-job training and independent study (called “striking for rate”), he attained the petty officer rating of electrician's mate in minimum time. (During the 1920s and 1930s, technicians with this rating were responsible for radio maintenance.)

=== Training in Navy schools ===
After passing a rigorous admission examination, in 1928 Cooke attended the six-month Radio Materiel School (RMS) at the Naval Research Laboratory (NRL) in Bellevue, District of Columbia. His performance at the RMS was such that on 16 October 1928, he received a Warrant Officer appointment as a Radio Electrician, one of the youngest persons ever to receive such appointment. His first assignment after receiving this appointment was on a seaplane tender, the USS Wright (AV-1), where he served for six years.

In 1934, Cooke attended the Warrant Officer's Radio Engineering School (RES), also located on the NRL campus. Upon graduating, Cooke was promoted to Chief Radio Electrician (the highest level Warrant Officer) on 18 October 1934. He then returned to the Wright and a year later was transferred to the aircraft carrier USS Saratoga (CV-3).

=== Instructor in Navy schools ===
In July 1938, Cooke was assigned to the staff of the Radio Engineering School; here he served four years as the Senior Instructor and also as a special advisor and lecturer at the companion RMS. During this time, he developed an extensive set of lecture notes that, published by McGraw-Hill, became his first full book. Cooke also developed a special slide rule that, with an extensive instruction manual, was manufactured and sold commercially by Keuffel and Esser, the primary supplier of engineering slide rules. The Cooke Radio Slide Rule had a 2π scale that was useful in many electrical calculations.

=== Electronics Training Program ===
During the final weeks of 1941, Cooke served on an ad hoc committee formed by the Personnel Division of the Bureau of Navigation (BuNav, then responsible for all training in the Navy) seeking a solution to the crisis in training electronic technicians. The navy had, or had in production planning, hundred of ships with advanced electronics (radar, sonar, and high-frequency communications), but qualified personnel for maintenance were almost non-existent. It was agreed that persons with an electrical engineering (EE) degree, or at least were graduates of the Warrant Officer's RES, would best fill this need, but they were unavailable in the numbers needed (BuPers was projecting needs in the tens of thousands).

The ad hoc committee, coordinated by William C. Eddy and with Cooke, several other leaders from existing schools, and BuNav training specialists as members, developed plans for a training program that would, in 10 months of 12-hour study days, cover all of the key topics in a normal college EE curriculum, as well as having laboratories involving the most current hardware. This activity, commonly called the Electronics Training Program (ETP), was approved by BuPers and initiated in mid-January 1942. To identify personnel potentially capable of being successful in such intensive training, a selection test (commonly called the Eddy Test) was devised. In a published paper by Cooke, it was noted that persons passing the test had an average of 1.5 years of prior college and were in the top two percent on the intelligence-quotient scale. In its entirety, the ETP was conducted across the Nation and continued until the end of the war. Of the estimated 500,000 persons who took the Eddy Test, only about 30,000 passed, entered the navy or Marine Corps, and eventually graduated from the ETP.

The ETP had a primary school (officially called EE&RM) and a secondary school (officially called Advanced RMS). Primary school was mainly given by six engineering colleges across the nation and, in three months, covered all topics normally in the first two years of an EE curriculum. The secondary school was given at four Naval facilities, including the RMS Bellevue. For completeness, Bellevue also initially gave a primary school, and on 15 August 1942, Cooke was commissioned a lieutenant (jg), and made the officer-in-charge of the Bellevue Primary School. He served in this position until May 1943; he was then promoted to lieutenant and named the executive officer of the overall RMS Bellevue. One of his first actions was to transfer the Bellevue Primary School to a college, thus making space for greatly increasing the size of the secondary school. Further promoted to lieutenant commander on 3 October 1945, he remained the leader of RMS Bellevue until late 1946; at that time, the activities were transferred to the Naval Training Center, Great Lakes.

For service during his tour of duty at the NRL-RMS, Cooke received a Letter of Commendation from the Secretary of the Navy, with authorization to wear the Commendation Medal. The citation includes the following:

For exceptional meritorious conduct in the performance of outstanding service to the United States Department of the Navy as the leader of the electronics training school at the Naval Research Laboratory, Lieutenant Commander Cooke contributed materially to the successful prosecution of the war against the enemy.

=== Soviet Blockade of Berlin ===
In February 1947, Cooke was assigned to the Staff of Commander, U.S. Naval Forces, Germany, as Assistant Technical Officer (Electronics and Aeronautics). Between June 1948 and May 1949, he was responsible for radio communications in the airlift during the Berlin Blockade, for which he was awarded the Medal for Humane Action. In August 1949, Cooke was assigned to the Bureau of Ships in Washington, D.C., where he headed the Installation Engineering Section until his retirement on 1 May 1951.

== Entrepreneur: Cooke Engineering Company ==
In mid-1951, Cooke established Cooke Engineering Company in Alexandria, Virginia. After operating as a sole-proprietorship firm for 10 years, he took the company public. Cooke Engineering also had an operation in San Mateo, California. After Cooke's death, the firm was acquired by Dynatech Corporation in 1968.

Under Government contracts, Cooke Engineering engaged in providing engineering services and in developing and manufacturing electronic products. Representative work included analysis of factors affecting naval shore communication stations, effects of radiation from buried cables, and electromagnetic coupling between power and control cables. Cooke's Manufactured products included power supplies, amplifiers, and patch panels.

Cooke also formed a Medical Research Division that designed and built microtitration devices (microplates) that were widely used in virological, serological, and immunological laboratory analysis.

== Technical book author ==
Although lacking a college education, Cooke, through self-study and Navy schools, had acquired considerable mathematical and technical knowledge and a skill for writing about complex subjects in a very readable manner. His publisher, McGraw-Hill, in a 1962 catalog, stated:

Nelson M. Cooke's 1942 book on applied mathematics, Mathematics for Radiomen and Electricians, remains unsurpassed for providing clearly understandable material for radio technicians, and his new book, Basic Mathematics for Electronics based on this earlier masterpiece, is equally of value for the technical college classroom.

Cooke began his experience as a writer in 1934, co-authoring “Preparation for Candidates, Radio Materiel School,” a manual published by the Naval Research Laboratory. His notes as an instructor at the Radio Materiel School and the Warrant Officer's Radio Engineering School were published as Mathematics for Electricians and Radiomen by McGraw-Hill in 1942; widely used as a textbook during the war years, this remains in the reference domain today. After designing a new slide rule for Keuffel and Essel (K&E) in 1942, he wrote the detailed booklet, “Instruction Manual for the 4139 Cooke Radio Slide Rule.”

Cooke's first book specifically for the public was Mathematics Essential to Radio and Electronics: Including Principles of Direct-Current and Alternating-Current Circuits; co-authored by Joseph Orleans; it was published by McGraw-Hill in 1943. Cooke also began a relationship with the Allied Radio Corporation in 1943, editing the "Radio Data Handbook: A Compilation of Formulas and Data Commonly Used in the Field of Radio and Electronics"; this very popular publication ultimately went through 16 editions.

In 1945, Cooke teamed with John Marcus, editor of the magazine Electronics, to compile the Electronics Dictionary, published by McGraw-Hill in four editions. A similar book, also co-authored by Marcus, was Electronics and Nucleonics Dictionary, published by McGraw-Hill in 1960.

As an outgrowth of his book Mathematics for Electricians and Radiomen, Cooke wrote Basic Mathematics for Electronics, first published by McGraw Hill in 1960. This became a popular textbook in technical schools and was later revised by Herbert Adams and several associate authors through seven editions, the last in 1992. In a recent history of McGraw-Hill, the success of this book is singled out, stating that it had total sales in excess of 485,000 copies. Cooke and Adams also co-authored Arithmetic Review for Electronics, published by McGraw-Hill in 1968, after Cooke's death.
