= Naval Air Technical Training Center Ward Island =

United States Navy base

Coordinates: 27°42′46″N 97°19′24″W

Naval Air Technical Training Center Ward Island is a decommissioned United States Navy base located on Ward Island, just offshore from Corpus Christi, Texas. During World War II (WWII), this base provided highly classified airborne electronics maintenance training for many thousands of Navy, Marine, Coast Guard, and Royal Air Force personnel.

== History ==
In 1924, the Radio Materiel School (RMS) opened on the campus of the Naval Research Laboratory (NRL) in Washington, DC. The RMS initially provided maintenance training of six months duration for two classes of 30 enlisted men each year. It soon gained the reputation of being the most difficult program to obtain admission as well as the hardest, most advanced training in the U.S. military services.

The curriculum of the RMS was devoted entirely to the theory and maintenance of radio communication equipment used aboard naval vessels and in shore stations. As electronic equipment advanced, particularly in reduced weight and size, there was increased used in naval aircraft; the maintenance of this equipment, however, was not taught at the RMS—this was left to the user units. As radar was being introduced, this deficiency became a critical issue.

=== Electronics Training Program ===
Immediately after the Japanese Attack on Pearl Harbor, 7 December 1941, an ad hoc committee met at the U.S. Navy Headquarters in Washington, D.C., to address the critical problem of electronics maintenance personnel. Radar, sonar, and other types of electronic systems were being developed, but there were almost no Navy personnel qualified to maintain these advanced technologies. Under the leadership of William C. Eddy, a medically retired (deafness) submarine officer, a radically new training program was devised and actually started 12 January 1942.

After a brief organizational period, this program (commonly called the Electronics Training Program or ETP) had three levels: a month-long Pre-Radio School. A three-month Primary School, and a five-month (later six- to seven-month) Secondary School. Admission to Pre-Radio required passing what came to be known as the Eddy Test, having an estimated 15-percent pass rate.

Most of the Pre-Radio Schools were in Chicago, many at Junior Colleges taken over by the Navy. Mainly taught by Navy and Marine personnel, these functioned as additional filtering, had a pass-rate of 50 percent or less, and repeating was not allowed. One study found that the average person completing Pre-Radio had 1.5 years of prior college and scored in the top two percent of Intelligence Quotient in the Nation.

Except for a prototype school run by Eddy in the Loop District of Chicago, the initial Primary Schools were operated by six engineering colleges across the nation. Here, the regular faculty condensed the primary topics from the first two years of an engineering curriculum into three months of 14-hour study days. The pass-rate of these schools was about 70 to 80 percent. As in Pre-Radio, repeating of a failed section was not allowed. As the war continued and the demand for qualified technicians increased, five Navy-operated Primary Schools were added.

The Secondary Schools were totally taught by Navy and Marine personnel, and the time was divided between advanced engineering topics and hands-on hardware laboratories. Schools at the NRL (an upgrade from the old RMS), at Treasure Island in the San Francisco Bay, and somewhat later, at Navy Pier in Chicago, were focused on shipboard and shore-based equipment. NATTC Ward Island (described in the next section) was the Secondary School concerned with equipment carried by aircraft. With the students having already been filtered in Pre-Radio and Primary, the pass-rate at the Secondary Schools was comparatively high (about 90 percent), and repeat of one section was allowed.

=== Aviation Electronics Training ===
Before the start of the war, the Bureau of Aeronautics had decided to open its own aviation electronics school. The Royal Air Force had recently started Training School No. 31 for this same purpose in Clinton, Ontario, and a small group of U.S. naval officers was sent there in mid-1941 to gather information for a similar school to be located on the campus of the Naval Academy at Annapolis, Maryland.

On 2 January 1942, 100 students started classes at Annapolis in what was called the Aviation Radio Materiel School (ARMS). The United States had just declared was on the Axis and Japan, and, even before the school opened, it was realized that a much larger school was needed. The Naval Air Station Corpus Christi (NASCC) for training pilots had opened the previous year. Ward Island, along a causeway two miles to the northeast, was ideally suited for a small training station that could be highly secure and draw on the NASCC for support functions.

The Navy acquired Ward Island in February 1942, facility construction started in May, and the school was commissioned on 1 July, becoming a Secondary School of the Electronics Training Program. An Administration Building, two instructional buildings, five barracks, and two mess halls were ready, but only a part of the 240-acre site had been cleared and most streets were unpaved. Instructional personnel and classroom equipment were transferred from Annapolis, as well students in the ongoing class. The first new class from Primary Schools was also started at this time. Commander George K. Stoddard was the initial Commanding Officer.

In September, the school was transferred from the Bureau of Aeronautics to the Air Training Command and officially designated the Naval Air Technical Training Center (NATTC) Ward Island. The first regular class of 106 students graduated in late September, and the following class of 152 students graduated in early October. Thereafter, a new class of 200 students started very two weeks. Initially, only radar topics were given and the instructional period was 20 weeks.

By mid-1943, most of the island had been cleared and grass planted, the streets and sidewalks were paved, and 77 buildings were in use. As new topics were added, the period first increased to 24 weeks and then to 28 weeks. Beginning in mid-1944, a new class started every week, and the number of students peaked at about 3,100.

Eventually, there were 87 buildings, including a dispensary with 34 beds, a 4,000-volume library, a 350-seat chapel, an even larger auditorium (destroyed by fire in early 1946), a well-stocked ship's store, a gymnasium, and a reception center for visitors. There were 17 barracks, several Bachelor Officer Quarters, and 6 mess halls. Outside there were a number of athletic fields and courts (the football field doubled as the parade ground), two swimming pools (every student had to pass a swimming test), and a cross-country track encircling most of the island. The secure compound had 16 instructional buildings and a large hangar with static aircraft. For training in flight, there was a hangar and a small fleet of planes at the nearby Naval Air Station.

==== Students and programs ====
Originally, NATTC Ward Island was primarily intended for training enlisted U.S. Navy and U.S. Marine personnel in advanced airborne electronics. In this, it was a Secondary School in the Electronics Training Program (ETP), and most of the students had previously finished Pre-Radio and Primary Schools. These men usually graduated from NATTC Ward Island with the Navy rating of Aviation Radio Technician (ART) 3rd or 2nd class, or Marine rank of Sergeant or Staff Sergeant. In 1945, the Navy rating was changed to Aviation Electronics Technician's Mate (AETM).

The Marine students, along with the Marine guards, were sufficient in number to warrant a Lieutenant Colonel as the Detachment Commander. This detachment also received training at Ward Island in military strategy and hand-to-hand combat.

Some Navy personnel who had achieved the ART ranking through self-study and apprenticeship (called "striking") were also admitted directly to all, or certain, courses in the advanced curriculum. There were also U.S. Coast Guard men in the advanced curriculum; most of these had earlier completed a preparatory school given by the Coast Guard that was similar to the Navy's Primary School.

Although the Royal Air Force (RAF) in Great Britain had equipment similar to that of the U.S., enough of the Navy equipment was being used by the Allies that knowledge of its maintenance was important to the RAF. Thus, the advanced training at NATTC Ward Island was open for approved RAF personnel. The British students would be instructed in separate groups, and occasionally these would have personnel from the Royal Canadian Air Force.

Most of the U.S. students at Ward Island were in the Secondary School of the Electronics Training Program. These students were all Navy and Marine enlisted men. However, in certain of the segments of this school there would occasionally be Warrant and Commissioned Officers. MIT had an advanced radar school that officers normally attended, but the instruction did not include airborne systems; thus, officers needing such instruction were sometimes assigned to NATTC Ward Island.

For a year starting in late 1942, a special three-month course was given for supply officers. After this course was discontinued, a similar course was started for officers in the WAVES; this continued until the end of the war. Throughout the existence of NATTC Ward Island, refresher courses for both officers and enlisted men were occasionally given.

==== Instruction and topics ====
Primary topics in the Secondary School at NATTC Ward Island were advanced electronic circuits, advanced radio receivers and transmitters, antennas and arrays, synchros and servomechanisms, waveguides and microwave transmission, and cavity magnetrons. Laboratory efforts centered on aircraft communication systems, high-frequency and microwave radar systems, radar altimeter systems, identification, friend or foe (IFF) systems, and long-range navigation (LORAN) systems. In addition to the regular curriculum, there were special courses on subjects such as the Norden bombsight and the magnetic anomaly detector (MAD), both highly classified at that time, and the Navy's first drone aircraft, the Target Drone Denny 1 (TDD-1).

All of the instruction was held within a highly restricted compound under 24-hour guard from the Marine Detachment. Students did not have access to the training compound after hours, and, when not in use, classroom notebooks were kept in secure containers within the compound. There was, however, a study room in each student barrack and these were usually filled in the evenings. Although textbooks were not issued for the classes, the base had a library with college-level textbooks, and most students purchased standard books such as Frederick Terman's Radio Engineering (McGraw-Hill, 1937).

== Closure ==
NATTC Ward Island continued for some time after the end of World War II. In mid-1946, a Primary School was added. The entire operation at Ward Island closed in the early fall of 1947, with the instructional program transferring to NATTC Memphis at Millington, Tennessee; about 10 years later, it relocated to Pensacola, Florida.

In November 1947, Ward Island became the site of the University of Corpus Christi, which eventually developed into Texas A&M University-Corpus Christi.
