= Nankervis =

Nankervis is a surname. Notable people with the surname include:

- Brian Nankervis (born 1956), Australian writer and comedian, creator of Rockwiz
- Bruce Nankervis (born 1950), Australian rules footballer
- Ian Nankervis (footballer, born 1944), Australian rules footballer
- Ian Nankervis (born 1948), Australian rules footballer
- Ken Nankervis, Australian man who in 1952 built a hut in New South Wales alpine country now known as the Nankervis Hut or Geehi Hut
- Luke Nankervis (born 2003), Australian rules footballer
- Stephen Nankervis (1890–1989), Australian rules footballer
- Tim Nankervis (active 2010s–2020s), Australian cellist, member of the Seraphim Trio
- Toby Nankervis (born 1994), Australian rules footballer
- Vic Nankervis (footballer, born 1893) (1893–1973), Australian rules footballer
- Vic Nankervis (footballer, born 1918) (1918–1986), Australian rules footballer
