= Radio Materiel School =

The Radio Materiel School (RMS) was the first electronics training facility of America's military organizations. Operated by the United States Navy, it produced during the 1920s and 1930s the core of senior maintenance specialists for the Navy's communication equipment, that according to USN fleet admiral Chester W. Nimitz "paved the way to United States world leadership in electronics."

== Background ==
Italian inventor and electrical engineer Guglielmo Marconi demonstrated Morse-code radio communication to the U.S. Navy in late 1899; two years later the decision was made to adopt his technology. At that time, Chief Electricians James H. Bell and William C. Bean were sent to Europe to examine available equipment and its operation and maintenance, thereby becoming the first radio technicians in the U.S. Navy. The Navy purchased its first communication sets from foreign manufacturers, but these were soon replaced with American products.

In the 1905–1916 period, the Navy continually expanded its radio communication capabilities. Stemming from the time when Navy communications were by flag signals and Ardois night-lights, radio equipment was operated by personnel with a Petty officer rating of Quartermaster. The operators were capable of making minor repairs to the equipment, but major maintenance was by persons with an Electrician rating. The Navy had no formal schools in radio communications; personnel attained the necessary knowledge through self-study and on-the-job training (called "striking for rate").

With war with Germany approaching, the Navy greatly increased its fleet and had major requirements for radio operators. In 1917, two large schools were opened for Morse-code radio operators: one at Harvard University and the other at Mare Island, California. Within a year, about 5,000 students were attending the 4-month operator courses. Some of these students were also given a brief course on equipment maintenance. During World War I (WWI), the Navy operated the largest radio communication system in the world.

In 1921, twenty years after the Navy began using radio communications, the Petty-officer ratings of Radioman and Electrician's Mate were finally adopted.

=== U.S. Naval Radio School at Harvard 1917–1919 ===
The Navy established a radio school at the Brooklyn Navy Yard in early 1917. With the entry of the United States into World War I, the student body grew exponentially, necessitating the move to a more suitable location. Later that year, the US Naval Radio School was launched in Cambridge, Massachusetts, where for the remainder of the war it occupied Harvard campus buildings for classrooms and, somewhat controversially, erected a temporary barracks nearby on Cambridge Common. Training focused on raising the student's Morse Code operating ability, measured at the rate of words per minute. Students were drawn from Naval Reserve stations around the country. A recruit was sent to Harvard upon reaching an aptitude of 10 words per minute; when he improved to 22 words per minute he was graduated and immediately transferred to the fleet. By Armistice in November 1918, enrollment reached its peak at 3,480 men under instruction. With the war over, enrollment dwindled, and in April 1919 the remaining personnel were transferred to the Great Lakes.

While enrolled at the school, students lived in dormitories and barracks on campus, while some boarded in local homes. Downtime was spent on excursions around the Boston region as well as socializing with local Cambridge residents in organized settings as well as spontaneously, and occasionally on a romantic basis.

== A central radio maintenance school ==
In the years just before and during World War I, there were significant advancements in many technologies. One of the most noteworthy was the application of the triode vacuum tube in receivers and transmitters, inaugurating the field of electronics. Recognizing the advantage to the Navy of both using and contributing to technology advancements, Thomas Edison led the Naval Consulting Board in recommending that the U.S. Congress establish a central naval research laboratory, charged with identifying and shepherding state-of-the-art military inventions. The Naval Research Laboratory (NRL) opened in July 1923, initially with a five-building campus on the east bank of the Potomac River at Bellevue in the District of Columbia.

The Radio Division, headed by Albert H. Taylor, was the first NRL unit to become fully operational. Taylor, who was previously a university professor and had earned a doctorate from the University of Göttingen, realized that highly trained personnel would be needed to maintain the electronic equipment originating at the NRL. Training within the Navy was the responsibility of the Personnel Division of the Bureau of Navigation (BuNav). With urging from Taylor and other NRL officials, BuNav opened the Radio Materiel School (RMS) in 1924. In 1927, a Radio Engineering School (RES) for Warrant Officers was opened and collocated with the RMS.

=== RMS operations ===
The RMS occupied space in one of the five initial buildings on the NRL campus and, although not directly under the NRL, it received administrative support from this organization. The mission of the RMS was to train enlisted men in the theory and maintenance of electronic equipment. Entrance required passing a difficult examination and several years of Navy experience in radio hardware. An extensive manual preparing candidate students was published by the NRL This manual included exercises for self-study in mathematics, electrical physics, and basic radio theory, as well as information on the organization and operation of the RMS.

The six-month curriculum combined theory and hands-on practice, with the students as familiar with a slide rule as with a soldering iron. Lecture topics included advanced algebra, trigonometry, the slide rule, electrical and electronic circuits, communication receivers and transmitters, antennas, and servomechanisms. The laboratories involved experiments related to the lecture topics, use of electronic instruments, and radio communication system maintenance. All formal instruction was by senior Petty Officers or Warrant Officers. As new electronic equipment came from the NRL, it was incorporated in the instruction, often with special lectures and demonstrations by the same scientists who were doing the research and development. Navy students normally held a Petty-officer rating as a Radioman or Electrician's Mate, and the top graduates were often promoted to Chief Petty Officer. During the initial decade, the RMS had two classes a year with 50 students each; on the average, about 70 percent of the entering students graduated.

In addition to Navy personnel, the RMS had select students from the U.S. Coast Guard and U.S. Marines. Arthur Godfrey, who later became a well-known radio and television entertainer, was a 1929 RMS graduate from the Coast Guard. A student and then instructor in that period was Marine Sergeant William P. Battell; he was later commissioned and, during World War II, served as the Marine Quartermaster General.

Nelson M. Cooke was a well-known instructor at the RMS. A 1928 RMS graduate, he later studied at the RES and was promoted to Radio Electrician. Further promotion to Chief Radio Electrician came in 1934, and in 1938, he was made a senior instructor in both the RMS and the RES. In this capacity, he wrote the applied mathematics textbook used in these schools; the book was later a highly successful publication of McGraw-Hill. Cooke also devised a special slide rule for radio calculations that was manufactured and sold by Keuffel and Esser.

=== RMS expansion ===
Starting in the mid-1930s, the potential of another major war led to a major increase in Navy strength. To support this, the RMS also enlarged its training of senior-level maintenance personnel; it increased class size and students per class, and new buildings were added on the NRL campus.

To obtain more student applicants, the requirement for radio experience in the Navy was eliminated. To compensate for this, the course length was increased to eight months and split into two segments. A three-month Primary segment covered mathematics, the slide rule, and introductory electric and electronic circuits; about half the time was spent in laboratories and fabrication shops. Chief Radio Electrician Cooke developed and led the Primary segment. A five-month Secondary or Advanced segment had the advanced lecture topics from the earlier six-month RMS curriculum, but with more laboratory time devoted to communication system and radio direction finder equipment.

In this same period, a revolutionary new radio application – later called radar – was emerging. At the NRL Radio Division, target detection and ranging by radio was first demonstrated by Robert M. Page in December 1934, was demonstrated aboard the USS Leary (DD-158) in July 1936, and began to be installed on battleships in 1939, thus beginning a new era in warfare. This technology was highly classified, and the acronym RADAR (RAdio Detection And Ranging) was coined by the Navy for use in unclassified identification; the noun radar quickly followed. Elementary radar was added to the RMS curriculum in 1940.

By early 1941, the RMS had increased its capabilities such that about 300 graduates per year might be possible. BuNav, however, was projecting the war-time requirements for radio technicians to be in the thousands. Thus, major changes in the training program were necessary. An aggressive recruiting activity in the civilian population was started in cooperation with the American Radio Relay League (ARRL). In this, the requirement of prior Navy experience in radio would be eliminated for new recruits who had a year or more experience as a licensed amateur radio operator or a commercial radio service technician. Such volunteers, after Recruit training (Boot Camp), would be entered into the RMS as a 3rd- or 2nd-class Petty Officer Radioman and without having to pass the admission examination.

To provide a major increase in training, BuPers directed that another school be opened on Treasure Island in the San Francisco Bay. To be called the RMS-Treasure Island, this would have an authorized complement of 800 and a curriculum replicating the RMS-Bellevue operation. Led by Lieutenant Commander Wallace J. Miller, the RMS-Bellevue Officer-in-Charge, development started in October 1941.

At the same time that the RMS-Treasure Island was being planned, the Bureau of Aeronautics (BuAer) started the development of a totally new training program, the Airborne Radio Materiel School (ARMS). To be located on the campus of the U.S. Naval Academy in Annapolis, Maryland, the ARMS would be a five-months course, entirely devoted to airborne radar maintenance. Sidney R. Stock, who had earlier founded a university radio and aviation program, was recruited as a Lieutenant Commander to organize this school. The annual output would be 500 Petty Officers rated as Aviation Radiomen. In early 1942, this was transferred to a more secure location, Ward Island, Texas.

== WWII Electronics Training Program ==
With the Japanese attack on Pearl Harbor and the entry of the United States into World War II, the Navy had a crisis concerning maintenance of electronic equipment. Huge numbers of new ships, submarines, and aircraft were under production or in planning, all loaded with the latest electronics, but, for their vital maintenance, only a few hundred qualified technicians were available or being trained.

An ad hoc committee had been formed at the Navy Headquarters to address this problem. The committee included Lieutenant Commander Stock, Lieutenant Commander Wallace, Chief Radio Electrician Cooke, and training specialists from BuNav. On 8 December 1941, William C. Eddy, a medically retired Navy Lieutenant who had earlier started a submarine electronics school, joined the committee and quickly became its leader. (Upon returning to active duty, Eddy was promoted to the rank of Captain in less than three years.)

The training program that they designed was commonly called the Electronics Training Program (ETP). With Primary and Secondary Schools, the Primary portion would be given by engineering colleges across the Nation, and upgraded portions of the existing RMS would become the ETP Secondary Schools. Admission would be through a stringent classification examination (later commonly called the Eddy Test). Plans for the new activity were approved by BuNav on 7 January 1942, and a prototype Primary School opened in downtown Chicago five days later. The ETP was very successful and remained in operation throughout the war, training an estimated 30,000 technicians.
