= Vic Nankervis =

Vic Nankervis may refer to:

- Vic Nankervis (footballer, born 1893) (1893–1973), Australian rules footballer who played for Essendon and Fitzroy
- Vic Nankervis (footballer, born 1918) (1918–1986), Australian rules footballer who played for Geelong, Footscray, St Kilda and South Melbourne
