= Douglas Munro =

Douglas Munro or Monroe may refer to:

- Douglas Albert Munro (1919–1942), United States Coast Guardsman and posthumous Medal of Honor recipient
  - USS Douglas A. Munro
- Douglas Munro (actor) (1866–1924), English actor
- Doug Munro (footballer) (1917–1989), Australian rules footballer for Essendon
- Doug Munro (musician), American musician
- Douglas Monroe (The Walking Dead), a character from The Walking Dead comic book series
