= Electronics Training Program =

U.S. military training in WWII

The Electronics Training Program (ETP) was the name commonly used for an unusual, difficult, and selective training activity of the United States Navy during World War II.

The ETP combined college-level classroom instruction with laboratories involving highly complex electronic systems that were classified secret, resulting in a level of training reported to have been the most intense and difficult ever given to enlisted servicemen. A highly regarded Naval officer noted that the ETP graduates were in the top three to five percent of the Navy's wartime personnel, officers as well as enlisted men.

== Background ==
As America entered WW II, there was a crisis concerning the availability of men qualified to maintain the huge amount of complex electronic equipment being procured for the Navy's ships, aircraft, submarines, and shore stations. The Navy had over 200,000 personnel, but only a few hundred were radio technicians, most having obtained their qualification through self-study and on-the job training. Further, only a few had any knowledge of radar, which would be extremely important in the war.

The Naval Research Laboratory (NRL) was established in 1923 at Bellevue in the District of Columbia. At the urging of Albert H. Taylor, head of the NRL Radio Division, an affiliated electronics training operation was added on the campus in 1924. Organizationally under the Training Division of the Bureau of Navigation (BuNav), the Radio Materiel School (RMS) was the Navy's first school in this rapidly developing technology. The Navy's use of radio started in the early 1900s, but equipment using vacuum tubes – and thus the electronics era – came into being around World War I.

During its first decade, the RMS gave two six-month classes per year with about 50 men in each; the graduation rate averaged around 70 percent. Admission involved passing a difficult examination. The instructors were senior petty officers or warrant officers. Lectures on up-to-date topics were often given by scientists and engineers from the NRL.

As more electronic equipment was added to the Navy, the RMS increased in size and the curriculum was divided into two parts. A primary element of three months covered the mathematics and basic theory, and a five-month Secondary element included some further theory but centered on laboratory work in hardware. Radar was added to the curriculum in 1940, upgrading the instruction to secret-level classified information. Chief Radio Electrician Nelson M. Cooke was responsible for the primary element, and Lieutenant Commander Wallace J. Miller was the officer-in-charge of the overall RMS.

In preparing for war, the BuNav directed that the RMS-Bellevue operation be replicated at a site in the vicinity of San Francisco, California. Miller was responsible for planning the implementation and recommended this to be on Treasure Island in the San Francisco Bay; development of RMS-Treasure Island began at the end of October 1941. This new RMS would accommodate up to 800 personnel in training.

In mid-1941, the Bureau of Aeronautics (BuAer), in cooperation with the BuNav, began development of the Aviation RMS (ARMS) to train technicians for airborne equipment maintenance. Located on the campus of the United States Naval Academy in Annapolis, Maryland, this would accommodate up to 500 students. Sidney R. Stock, previously head of a college program in aviation and radio technology was recruited as a lieutenant commander to organize the ARMS. Before it had graduated any students, planning began for transferring the ARMS to a more secure location, Ward Island, near Corpus Christi, Texas.

The annual output of operations at RMS-Bellevue, RMS-Treasure Island, and ARMS would be a few thousand, but the BuNav estimated that the wartime requirement would be in the tens of thousands. Further, the depth of capability of graduates from the existing instruction was also inadequate. Electronics would have a major role in the next war – which was now inevitable – but equipment, if not maintained, would be worthless. The NRL and the newly formed Radiation Laboratory, as well as a number of industries, were developing electronic systems that were far above the average maintenance capabilities of existing Navy technicians. This was especially true after late 1940, when Great Britain shared its electronic secrets (including the cavity magnetron) during the Tizard Mission. These shortcomings were a crisis that required an immediate solution.

== A new approach to electronic training ==
In November 1941, the BuNav set up an ad hoc committee to examine the changing requirements for electronic maintenance personnel and to propose a plan for meeting these requirements. Time was of the essence – war was imminent. The committee participants were primarily persons who were already fully knowledgeable of the situation. These included N. M. Cooke from RMS-Bellevue, W. J. Miller from RMS-Treasure Island and Bellevue, and S. R. Stock from the Aviation RMS. There were other practitioners as well as training specialists from the BuNav. On 8 December – the day after the attack on Pearl Harbor – William C. Eddy, a medically retired (deafness) lieutenant, joined the committee and quickly became its leader. An authority in the emerging field of television, Eddy had earlier started an electronics school for submariners.

A major topic of discussion was the type of technicians needed. As the hardware became more and more complex, the maintenance technicians needed broad as well as in-depth knowledge. Navy technicians would also be required to make rapid repairs on combat-critical equipment in locations where assistance from the outside – such as technical representatives of industries – would not be available. Modular design, where a failure might be corrected by changing out a module, was not yet in use; thus, maintenance required detailed circuit tracing and knowledge of the circuit theory. It was agreed that the ideal situation would be to recruit persons with an electrical engineering (EE) or similar education and put them through the existing five-month advanced segment of the RMS to learn Navy hardware. This approach, however, was not practical; persons with this background were not only very limited in number but also in high demand by industry and the military.

The Navy had sent a few men to a recently opened Royal Air Force (RAF) electronics school in a base at Clinton, Canada. This school was somewhat similar to the RMS and had been examined by Stock in planning the ARMS. A major difference was that the primary portion of the RAF school was given by a number of technical colleges throughout Canada. As the committee discussed possibilities of using a similar approach in an upgraded RMS, Eddy suggested that since the first two years of an EE curriculum covered essentially all of the basic topics, a shortened version of this curriculum might be used to produce the desired aforementioned EEs.

In a few days, a plan for training the desired technicians evolved. The central elements of this plan were the following:

- Like the existing RMS, the training program would have a primary school three months in length followed by a five-month secondary school.
- Admission would be through a to-be-developed classification examination for identifying persons with the capability and willingness to pursue the advanced, highly concentrated study.
- Primary school would be given by engineering colleges and cover the major topics normally included in the first two years of an EE curricula.
- Secondary school would center on Navy electronic hardware, but would include more operational theory and selected advanced topics from upper-level college engineering studies. Conducted at highly secure Navy facilities, instruction would be given by Navy and Marine senior enlisted personnel and Warrant Officers.
- To attract the desired students, men passing the classification examine could enter the Navy as Seamen First Class (bypassing the first two levels) and would go through Boot Camp in special companies.
- New Petty-officer ratings of Radio Technician (RT) and Aviation Radio Technician (ART) would be opened, with promotion, depending on performance, at various points in the training.

Eddy, then director of experimental television station W9XBK in Chicago, volunteered to provide both the space and instructional staff for a prototype primary school. He also volunteered to lead the development of the classification examination – thereafter popularly called the Eddy Test. Eddy had returned to Chicago and obtained concurrence from the station owner, Balaban and Katz; they not only approved but also made the space and staff available at no cost to the Navy.

The RMS-Bellevue and RMS-Treasure Island would continue in their existing locations and serve as secondary schools for shipboard and land-based electronics. Their existing Primary segment would be phased out as the new primary schools became fully operational. The Aviation RMS, which was just opening and preparing to move to Ward Island, Texas, would serve as the secondary school for airborne electronics.

The plan was submitted to BuNav, and was approved by Captain Louis E. Denfeld on 7 January 1942; Denfeld had been appointed only five days earlier to head up all Navy training. The program was initiated on 12 January with the opening of the prototype primary school at the top floor of the State-Lake Theater building in downtown Chicago.

== Elements of the ETP ==
Other than the designation "Radio (or Electronics) Technician Training", no official name appears on records for the overall program; however, Electronics Training Program (ETP) was the commonly used name. Official records sometimes show different names for the two levels of schools: Elementary Electricity & Radio Materiel (EE&RM) rather than Primary, and Advanced Radio Materiel (ARM) rather than Secondary. Since there was little "elementary" content in the EE&RM curriculum, these initials were usually taken to mean Electrical Engineering & Radio Materiel.

As the local aspects of the ETM unfolded, the effort was designated Naval Training Schools-Radio Chicago, an official Navy unit commanded by Eddy. In a little more than two years after returning to active duty, Eddy was promoted to the rank of captain.

=== Radio Chicago ===
When fully operational, Radio Chicago had three major functions: conducting a prototype primary school, grading and maintaining records of Eddy Tests, and handling four Pre-Radio Schools in the Chicago area. It began with offices on the top floor of the State-Lake Theater Building at 190 North State Street, Chicago, then expanded to also occupy all four floors of a nearby building at 64 North State Street. Other functions included operating a teacher training school, building visual aids for classrooms, providing first-level medical services for the thousands of Chicago students and staff, and handling a reception and entertainment center where well-known musician Alvino Rey conducted the Radio Chicago Orchestra.

==== Prototype primary school ====
In the approved plan, Eddy would offer a developmental-prototype primary school with classrooms and laboratories in the experimental television facilities at 190 North State Street. Archibald H. Brolly, chief engineer of W9XBK and graduate of the University of California, Harvard, and MIT, led in developing the initial curriculum and served as the lead instructor. The first class was mainly composed of experienced electrician mates from the fleet and ham radio operators who had recently enlisted as petty-officer radiomen.^{1942}

A main purpose of the prototype school was to ensure that the curriculum in college-operated schools was appropriate preparation for Navy-operated secondary schools. It was intended that the prototype school would be unnecessary after graduating a few classes, but the importance of this activity became such that it continued for the life of the ETP. Initially, all of the instructors were from the W9XBK engineering staff; later, Navy and Marine instructors were added.

==== Eddy Test ====
The Eddy Test was certainly the most widely recognized element of the ETP. Many resumes and biographies of men who were in the WWII Navy make reference to having passed or failed the Eddy Test. This was the commonly used name for the Radio Technician Selection Test (RTST, NavPers 16578), the first version of which was prepared under Eddy's leadership in January 1942. In an article, published after the war in the journal American Psychologist, the following justification was noted for the difficulty of the test:

In such an extensive training program as that for radio technicians which demands a high degree of concentration and ability, the Navy could ill afford to spend several months training men who, because of lack of ability, were unable to complete the training.

The Eddy Test was given to men in high schools, colleges, and recruiting centers. It was also given to men entering the Navy or already in the fleet when they scored high on the Otis Higher Examination. (Note: The Otis Higher Examination (sometimes called the Otis Test or Otis Measure of Brightness) was taken by essentially all persons entering the U.S. Navy during WWII, and was used in assessing basic capabilities for attending training programs.) There was a firm pass-fail criteria for grading the Eddy Test, and a second chance was not allowed; therefore, it was necessary to have a central point for both grading and recording the test results. This was done by a team of WAVES at Radio Chicago. The content of the Eddy Test was tightly controlled – no public available copies are known to exist. An estimated 500,000 or more persons took the test during WWII.

==== Pre-Radio School ====
As soon as the prototype primary school began, and later carrying into the primary schools at engineering colleges, it was realized that many of the students being admitted did not have the necessary capabilities or willingness for training of this nature. In late 1942, BuPers* directed that a one-month Pre-Radio School be added to the ETP. Through this, weeding in addition to the Eddy Test would result, and special preparation could also be received. (*) The Bureau of Navigation (BuNav) was renamed Bureau of Naval Personnel (BuPers – later BUPERS) in May 1942.

An initial Pre-Radio School was temporarily set up at the Chicago Naval Reserve Armory. During early 1943, as the need for this activity increased, the initial school was moved to nearby Michigan City, Indiana, and three facilities were leased from the Chicago Board of Education. For two years, the following Pre-Radio Schools were operated by Radio Chicago:

- Wilbur Wright Junior College, Chicago
- Theodore Herzl Junior College, Chicago
- Hugh Manley High School, Chicago
- Naval Reserve Armory, Michigan City, Indiana

Each of these Pre-Radio Schools had up to 1000 students at any given time. One study found that the average person completing Pre-Radio had 1.5 years of prior college and scored in the top two percent of intelligence quotient in the Nation.

In a four-week curriculum, Pre-Radio included a lightning-speed review of high school mathematics (through second-level algebra), physics (mainly electricity and magnetism), and elementary chemistry. Eddy, Brolly, and other instructors at the prototype primary school wrote a book to assist students in this effort. Each entering student was issued a Cooke Slide Rule, and these were used from the first day. (Note: Radio Slide Rule, designed by Nelson M. Cooke for the RMS and sold commercially by Keuffel and Esser.) Much attention was given to electrical components, their standards, and graphic symbols. There was also hands-on work with electrical instruments and in shop practices. Lack of speed and accuracy in using the slide rule, instruments, and shop tools was often the downfall of otherwise capable students.

Instructors in the Pre-Radio Schools were Navy Petty Officers or Marine Sergeants, many who were former high-school teachers. Classroom lectures, laboratory work, and organized problem sessions were conducted 13 hours or more every weekday. A comprehensive examination was given on Saturday mornings, and a failing grade on a topic could result in dismissal; repeating a week was normally not allowed. The intensity led to many voluntary dropouts. Overall, the graduation rate from Pre-Radio Schools was around 40 percent.

=== Primary school ===
As the ETP was being planned by the ad hoc committee, a primary school patterned after the Primary Segment at NRL-Bellevue was considered; Cooke, who had been a key figure in the NRL activity, was the major proponent of this option. Other committee members felt that students for the secondary school should be recruited from persons who had already completed a degree, or at least had two years of study in electrical engineering, and could bypass the Primary altogether. A compromise was reached by Eddy's proposing a primary school taught in electrical engineering schools and compressing the major topics of the first two years of a normal curriculum into three months. Eddy would lead a prototype primary school (previously described as a part or Radio Chicago) that would ensure the curriculum in college-operated schools to be appropriate preparation for Navy-operated secondary school. The top-performing Navy graduates of primary school usually received a promotion to petty-officer 3rd class radio technician.

==== College-operated primary school ====
Colleges and universities with electrical engineering programs were invited by BuNav to a meeting on contracting for the primary schools. The mid-January meeting was held in New Orleans; specifications were given, and those interested were given one week to submit full proposals. After very speedy evaluations and visits to the campuses, contracts, over Captain Denfeld's signature, were awarded to six schools:

- Bliss Electrical School (see History, Montgomery College)
- Grove City College (see History)
- Oklahoma A&M College (see History, Oklahoma State University)
- the Agricultural & Mechanical College of Texas (see History, Texas A&M University)
- Utah State College of Agriculture (see History, Utah State University)
- University of Houston (see History)

Primary school was started at all six schools during March 1942. An article in the November 1942 issue of QST gives a description, including pictures, of the primary school at each of these institutions. Bliss Electrical School was the only privately owned, for-profit institute in this group. Founded in 1893, it was absorbed by Montgomery College in 1950.

The contracts called for starting every month a new class of 100 students for three months of instruction. The schools would provide the instructors, classrooms, laboratories, dormitories, food services, and health and recreational facilities. Textbooks, classroom supplies, and an engineering slide rule (usually a K&E Log-Log Duplex Decitrig) were also supplied. (The slide rule in its holder strapped on the belt was a standard part of students' uniform of the day.) The contracts required the schools to provide all of this under a flat-rate per student-month.

A complement of about 10 Navy and Marine officers and enlisted men, under an officer-in-charge (usually a lieutenant or lieutenant commander), handled the administration and military activities. Two members of the original ad hoc committee received such assignments: William Grogan, raised in rank to lieutenant commander, went to Grove City, and Sidney Stock returned to Utah State. At other schools, the officer-in-charge was often a faculty member with a reserve commission who had returned to active duty. A senior faculty member from each school was assigned to have overall instructional responsibility.

A basic list of topics to be covered was prescribed, but it was up to the schools to develop this into a three-month instructional program. Mandatory topics included the following: advanced d-c and a-c circuit theory, electrical motors and generators, vacuum-tube characteristics, power supplies, amplifiers, oscillators, modulation techniques, filters and wave-shaping, receiver circuits, transmitter circuits, transmission lines and antennas, and basic electromagnetic propagation theory. (Note: Attachment to contracts signed by Captain Louis E. Denfeld, dated 2 February 1942, between the U.S. Navy Bureau of Navigation and six colleges for conducting EE&RM schools) Mathematical topics (mainly trigonometry and elementary calculus) were taken up when necessary for developing theoretical equations. Each student built a superheterodyne receiver, and fault-finding was taught using systematic signal-tracing.

Eight hours per weekday were devoted to lectures and laboratories, and there were at least four hours of homework or supervised study in the evenings; athletics and some drill were fitted in wherever possible. Saturday mornings were devoted to examinations on the topics of the previous week. The repeat of a week was not allowed except under extenuating circumstances. Before the addition of Pre-Radio School, the graduation rate was unacceptably low; later, it averaged about 80 percent. In 1943, the incoming class size was increased to 110, and a new class started every two weeks. Collectively, the primary schools were then graduating about 1,000 men per month.

As the war continued, men trained in the ETP secondary schools were being rotated out of the fleet and overseas bases. Some of these, particularly those with prior teaching experience, were assigned at colleges to augment the regular faculties. These men brought a new perspective to the instructional program, giving the students a picture of things to come. They officially reported to the Officer-in-Charge, but, as teachers, were under the civilian Director of Instruction.

==== Navy-operated primary school ====
Both RMS-Bellevue and RMS-Treasure Island temporarily operated primary schools, but these were phased out for enlargements of the secondary school – at Treasure Island in June 1942, and at Bellevue in December 1943. The Airborne secondary school at Ward Island opened in July 1942, and then went into a series of expansions. By the end of 1943, these secondary schools were essentially full and the BuPers ordered the opening of a fourth secondary school, the largest of them all, at Navy Pier in Chicago.

The college-operated primary schools could no longer meet the secondary school needs; therefore, additional primary schools under Navy operation were begun in late 1943. These were set up as full Navy bases. A reservoir of military personnel trained in the ETP was now available, so all of the instruction was by Petty Officers or Marine Sergeants.

In addition to the primary school at RMS-Bellevue, and the one briefly operated at RMS-Treasure Island, Navy-operated primary schools were established at five locations:

- College of the Ozarks – a small liberal arts school in Clarksville, Arkansas
- Del Monte Hotel – a huge complex in Monterey, California
- Naval Training Center, Gulfport, Mississippi
- Naval Training Center, Great Lakes, Illinois
- Ford Motor's River Rouge plant in Dearborn, Michigan.

The Navy leased the facilities of the College of the Ozarks (now University of the Ozarks) in January 1944, moving to there the primary school previously at RMS-Bellevue. The Ozarks school operated to May 1945, giving training to an estimated total of 3,000 students.

The Del Monte Hotel (now the location of the Naval Postgraduate School) was leased in February 1943 for conducting a large Pre-Flight Training School. A year later, this was changed to an ETP primary school, which continued in operation until June 1947, serving about 6,000 students, the most of any of the primary schools.

In 1942, the Navy opened a large base at Gulfport, Mississippi, primarily for servicing the Naval Construction Battalion (Seabees). In March 1944, the base was converted to the U.S. Naval Training Center, Gulfport; training courses for several ratings were provided, including an ETP primary school. This primary school continued until March 1946, handling an estimated 2,500 men.

Naval Station Great Lakes opened in 1911, and continuously since then has been the largest training base in the Navy. An ETP primary school was opened in early 1945. Most trainees then took Boot Camp at Great Lakes, went to Chicago for Pre-Radio, returned to Great Lakes for Primary, then went back to Chicago's Navy Pier for Secondary. An estimated 1,200 men at a time were in the ETP at Great Lakes for the next year.

The River Rouge Complex of Ford Motor Company was the world's most famous industrial plant. As WWII approached, Ford offered its training capabilities to the Navy, and in January 1941, the Naval Service Training School at the Rouge Complex was opened. From then until it closed in May 1946, 22,000 men had been trained in a number of different areas. In early 1945, BuPers added a Pre-Radio and primary school at the Training Complex. This had not been fully activated before the end of the war, and, after graduating only a few classes, was closed in May 1946.

=== Secondary school ===
The secondary school in the ETP was an outgrowth of the Secondary segment of the RMS-Bellevue. The ETP secondary school initially retained the same five-month length and with the same basic curriculum, but the topics were presented at a higher level, taking into account the better preparation of the entering students. The schools were located as follows:

- Advanced Radio Materiel, Naval Research Laboratory, Bellevue, D.C.
- Advanced Radio Materiel, Treasure Island, San Francisco Bay, California
- Advanced Radio Materiel, Navy Pier, Chicago, Illinois
- Naval Air Technical Training Center, Ward Island, Texas

The three Advanced Radio Materiel (ARM) secondary schools were devoted to shipboard and shore-based electronic equipment, while the NATTC School was devoted to electronic equipment carried on airplanes and anti-submarine blimps.

Much of the equipment studied was classified as Secret; therefore, physical security was a major factor in selecting school locations, and the instructional compounds were all under 24-hour guard by armed Marines. All U.S. students were required to be cleared for classified information; similarly, foreign students were cleared through respective State Departments under bilateral security agreements. In classroom and laboratory sessions, students were required to take notes, but these were placed in security cabinets at the close of the study day.

Instructional topics were given in week-long sessions, with 8-hour study days averaging about equal time between lectures and laboratories. During evening study, most students developed a notebook on the fundamental, unclassified information. An examination was given each Saturday morning; these examinations were prepared and graded by a separate staff. A repeat of one week (more under extenuating circumstances) was allowed.

With the filtering of pre-radio and primary, only very capable students made it into secondary school. If they had not been earlier promoted when finishing primary school, students were allowed to stand an examination for Petty-officer 3rd class Radio Technician after satisfactorily completing several months in secondary school. The graduate rate of secondary school was high, likely between 90 and 95 percent. Top-performing Navy graduates were promoted to Petty-officer 2nd or even 1st class Radio Technician; this rating was changed to Electronics Technician Mate (ETM) or Aviation Electronics Technician Mate (AETM) in 1945. It has been noted that about 25 percent of the ETP graduates during the war were promoted to the rank of Warrant or Commissioned Officer.

==== Advanced Radio Materiel ====
While mainly intended for Navy enlisted men, the ARM schools also had students from the Marine Corps and Coast Guard, a few civilians (mainly NRL employees), some military men from Great Britain and its Commonwealth Nations, and, occasionally, a company of Navy commissioned officers, including WAVES. When commissioned officers were in a course taught by an enlisted man, the Officer-in-Charge initiated the instruction by stating that the instructor had the authority of a superior officer.

The basic curriculum of the ARM secondary school was carefully coordinated for uniformity, but some differences existed in the specific hardware studied at the three bases. The eight-hour school day consisted of about equal time in classrooms and laboratories, with lectures dominating in the beginning months and becoming more "hands-on" later. BuPers convened a conference on the ETP in December 1943, at which time the secondary school was increased from 5 months to 24 weeks with new topics added (especially sonar). (This same conference defined Pre-Radio to be 4 weeks and Primary to be 12 weeks.)

The ARM secondary school began with a brief review of electronic components, circuits, and basic laboratory instruments. As the courses evolved, they eventually included the following topics: high-frequency and ultra-high-frequency receiver and transmitter principles; coaxial cable, waveguides, antenna arrays, and beam forming; synchros and plan position indicators; radio direction-finding; pulse-generation and wave-shaping methods; basic radar theory; microwave theory and cavity magnetrons; radar jamming and countermeasures; identification friend or foe techniques; long-range navigation and hyperbolic navigation techniques; and sonar theory and underwater acoustics.

Laboratories included the use of all types of electronic test equipment. Operational measurements and repair methods involved HF and VHF communication receivers and transmitters, air-search and fire-control radars, low-frequency LORAN receivers and transmitters, and sonar systems. Considerable time, particularly in the later months, was devoted to trouble-shooting.

===== ARM Bellevue =====
The RMS facilities on the NRL campus had been considerably expanded in the years immediately preceding the war; by early 1941, the entering class had increased to 135 men. After the start of the war and the initiation of the ETP, a new class began every two months. In August 1942, Wallace Miller was increased in rank to commander, and made officer-in-charge. At the same time, Nelson Cooke was commissioned a Lieutenant (jg) and named officer-in-charge of the remaining primary school. When the primary school at Bellevue was transferred to the College of the Ozarks in January 1944, Cooke was increased in rank to Lieutenant (later Lieutenant Commander) and named the executive officer of ARM Bellevue. The student complement increased to about 1,200 men, mainly Navy but with about 15 percent Marines. The course length eventually increased to 28 weeks with a new class every two weeks, resulting in a peak in 1945 of close to 2,400 men attending. At the end of 1946, ARM Bellevue closed with the training being taken up at Great Lakes; this marked the end of the Radio Materiel School that had operated for 22 years. Since the start of WWII and the ETP, the school had graduated an estimated 8,000 men.

===== ARM Treasure Island =====
In October 1941, BuNav authorized a school to be established on Treasure Island, the site of the 1939–1940 Golden Gate International Exposition. The curriculum basically replicated that existing at RMS-Bellevue, but with a much larger student body. When the ETP was formed the following January, this became the ARM Treasure Island, and for a brief period included a primary school. Commander Harry F. Breckel was the first commanding officer (he was promoted to the rank of captain in early 1944). The first class of 566 students was about 25 percent Hams, entering as Radioman Petty Officer Second Class. Special placement examinations divided the class into different levels, allowing the first graduation in only a few months; many of the early graduates immediately became instructors. The radar laboratories were on close by, highly secure Yerba Buena Island, and ARM Treasure Island had the lead in developing sonar lectures and laboratories. This school graduated about 10,000 technicians under the wartime curriculum, the last in June 1946. It remained a peacetime Navy advanced electronics "C" School until 1996.

===== ARM Navy Pier =====
Originally opened in 1916 as a shipping and recreational facility, Navy Pier in Chicago extended 3,300 feet into Lake Michigan. In August 1941, Navy Pier was taken over and converted to a major Naval Training School. It was renovated to accommodate a large number of service personnel, primarily for mechanical ratings. Near the end of 1943, BuPers directed that most of this be converted to a fourth secondary school. After extensive renovations, including building 100 new classrooms, the first class began in early June 1944. Captain Edwin A. Wolleson was the commanding officer, and Commander Charles C. Caveny served as the educational officer. Two new classes started weekly, each with up to 120 students; this gave a complement of near 6,000 men, making it the largest school in the ETP. ARM Navy Pier closed in mid-1946. An estimated 18,000 men completed secondary school at Navy Pier, a significant portion of whom came to the school directly from the fleet, rather than through primary school.

==== NATTC Ward Island ====
When the ETP was being developed, the BuAer agreed that the Aviation RMS just getting underway in Annapolis, Maryland, would be moved to a more secure and larger facility. Ward Island, a small, uninhabited island a short distance from the newly opened Naval Air Station Corpus Christi, was selected. In a crash effort, the facilities were ready for the first class at the beginning of July 1942. Commander (later Captain) George K. Stoddard had been brought from retirement to oversee the Ward Island development, and then remained as the commanding officer. Lieutenant Commander Stock, who had started the school in Annapolis, served as the initial superintendent of training. In September, the school was designated the Naval Air Technical Training Center Ward Island (NATTC Ward Island), serving as the aviation secondary school in the ETP. Initially, Navy enlisted graduates received a petty-officer rating of aviation radio technician (ART); this was changed to aviation electronics technician mate (AETM) in 1945.

Within a short time after opening, a new class of 200 trainees arrived every two weeks. Initially 20 weeks in length, the course increased to 24 weeks in early 1943, then to 28 weeks and a new class each week by mid-1944. In July 1943, cognizance of this school was moved from the BuAer to BuPers. The official name of the school was changed to Airborne Electronics Maintenance in May 1944.A course for supply officers was started during 1943, and a similar course for WAVES followed. In addition to Navy and Marine enlisted men, there were students from the U.S. Coast Guard, the Royal Air Force, the Canadian Royal Air Force, and some from Australia and Brazil. The number of students peaked during 1944 at about 3,100.

The curriculum at Ward Island had many of the same topics at the three ARM secondary schools, but with a number of notable differences. The Navy's airborne equipment was physically much smaller than shipboard and land-based electronics, and had to use the power generated by the carrying vehicle. Also, it was often designed to be operated by either the aircraft pilot or a crew member who had other primary duties; thus, it was necessarily easier to adjust – often including automatic tuning; therefore, lecture instruction included topics to support these requirements. Most airborne radios operated in VHF bands, and the associated antennas and their placement were important topics. Microwave radar, which required less physical space than its VHF predecessor, soon became the dominant feature in airborne applications; this required considerable attention be given to dish antennas and their mechanical drives. Sonar was not included, but there was more attention given to recognition (IFF), direction-finding, and LORAN radio-navigation systems. There were also special courses on subjects such as the Norden bombsight, the magnetic anomaly detector (MAD), and the Target Drone Denny (TDD-1).

One of the laboratories was in a hangar that contained several aircraft for ground-testing of electronic equipment. NATTC Ward Island also had a small fleet of aircraft of various types that operated from nearby NAS Corpus Christi; every student was required to have flight time in operating the on-board equipment.

During the war years, an estimated 10,000 persons received ETP training at NATTC Ward Island. In addition, a similar number were involved in refresher and special courses, and in training of non-U.S. military personnel.

== Related schools ==
Several other advanced schools for electronic maintenance were operated by the Navy during WWII. For graduates of the ARM secondary schools who volunteered for submarine service, there was advanced maintenance training in radar, sonar, and other electronic equipment at the Submarine School, Submarine Base, New London, Connecticut. The New London school also had courses for Officers; this training activity was initially started by Lieutenant William C. Eddy in the early 1930s. For upgrading technicians already in fleet service, there were radar schools at the Naval Air Station, San Diego, California, and the Naval Operating Base, Norfolk, Virginia. The San Diego school was the Airborne Radar School, Fleet Air West Coast. Two schools were at Norfolk: the Radar Materiel School on the Main Base, and the Fleet Service School at nearby Virginia Beach, Virginia. At Pearl Harbor Naval Base, there was a Fleet Service School that gave a three-month radar maintenance course.

The Radar School for Navy Officers was at the Massachusetts Institute of Technology (MIT). For persons holding an electrical engineering degree, this school gave two months of classroom instruction, followed by three months of laboratory work on hardware. For other non-EE persons, there was a five-month Pre-Radar School at Harvard University; this had a curriculum very similar to the ETP Pre-Radar and primary schools. The first published book on radar was prepared by the staff of the MIT Radar School.

== ETP closure ==
Shortly after the victory in Europe on 8 May 1945 (V-E Day), the remaining college-based primary schools were closed, as well as the Navy-Operated school at the College of the Ozarks. With the surrender of Japan on 2 September 1945 (V-J Day), the entire ETP began a transition to peacetime, regular Navy operation. By the end of the year, Radio Chicago was closed; this included the State-Street primary school and all of Pre-Radio Schools (review topics and the slide-rule were added to the curriculum of the remaining primary schools). The primary school at Gulfport closed in March 1946, and the base was decommissioned. Del Monte, the last stand-alone primary school, continued until June 1947.

In June 1946, ARM Navy Pier was also transferred to Great Lakes, and ARM Bellevue followed at the end of the year. These were combined and eventually evolved into an Electronics Technician "A" School. ARM Treasure Island, fed by students from Great Lakes and, for a while, from Del Monte, continued as a secondary school; this later evolved into an Advanced Electronics "C" School. In mid-1946, NAATC Ward Island added its own primary school; then in October 1947, all of the activities were transferred to NATTC Memphis (actually at Millington, Tennessee) and Ward Island was decommissioned.

Captain Eddy received a Legion of Merit in December 1945, recognizing his contributions in the "recruiting, selection, and training of radio technicians". In the citation, it is noted that through 1945, some 30,000 technicians completed the full Electronic Training Program.

The Eddy Test (RTST 16578) continued to be used by the Navy for several years in the selection of trainees for electronics schools. In 1951, the Bureau of Naval Personnel contracted with Columbia University to develop a new Electronic Technician Selection Test (ETST). This was specified to be "somewhat less difficult than the RTST, with a maximum discrimination at or near the seventy-fifth percentage of the general high school population."
