= Ward Island (Texas) =

Island in the US state of Texas

Coordinates: 27°42′46″N 97°19′24″W

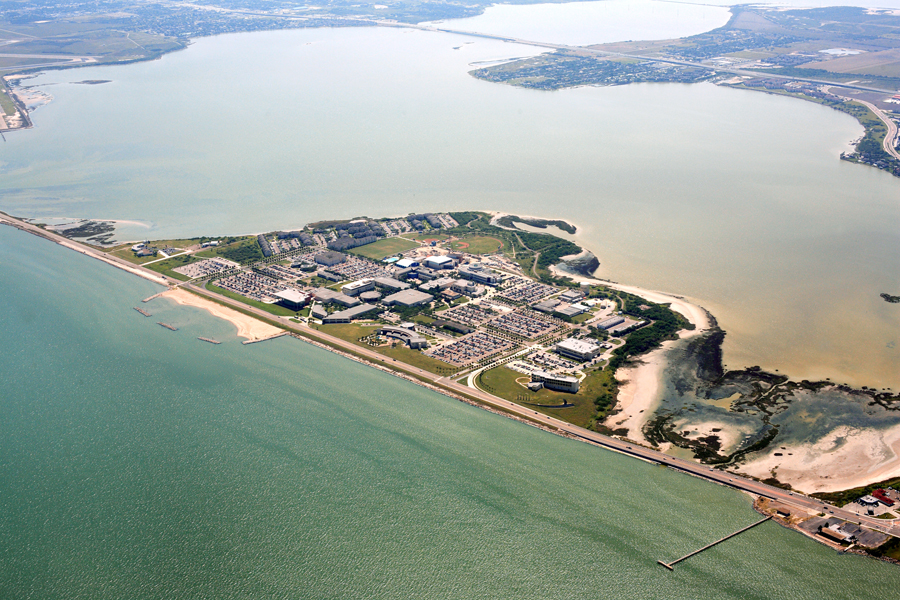
Ward Island in 2010

Ward Island is a small body of land situated at the confluence of Corpus Christi Bay and Oso Bay and is part of the city of Corpus Christi, Texas. Most of Ward Island is now used by Texas A&M University-Corpus Christi.

More correctly classed as a peninsula, Ward Island is connected to the Corpus Christi shoreline by about 1,500 ft (460 m) of wetland. It is roughly triangular in shape, some 5,000 ft (1,500 m) long across the front and 2,500 ft (760 m) average depth, giving approximately 240 acres (0.97 km^{2}) in useful size, or 259 acres (1.04 km^{2}) counting the wetland. The soil is clay, formed by erosion, contrasted to sand islands formed by deposition. Its maximum elevation is only about 15 ft (4.6 m) above the sea-level of Corpus Christi Bay. A causeway (Ocean Drive) connects the island to the Corpus Christi shore, then extends beyond the island to the opposite side of Oso Bay and the Naval Air Station Corpus Christi at Flour Bluff about 1.0 mi (1.6 km) away.

== History ==
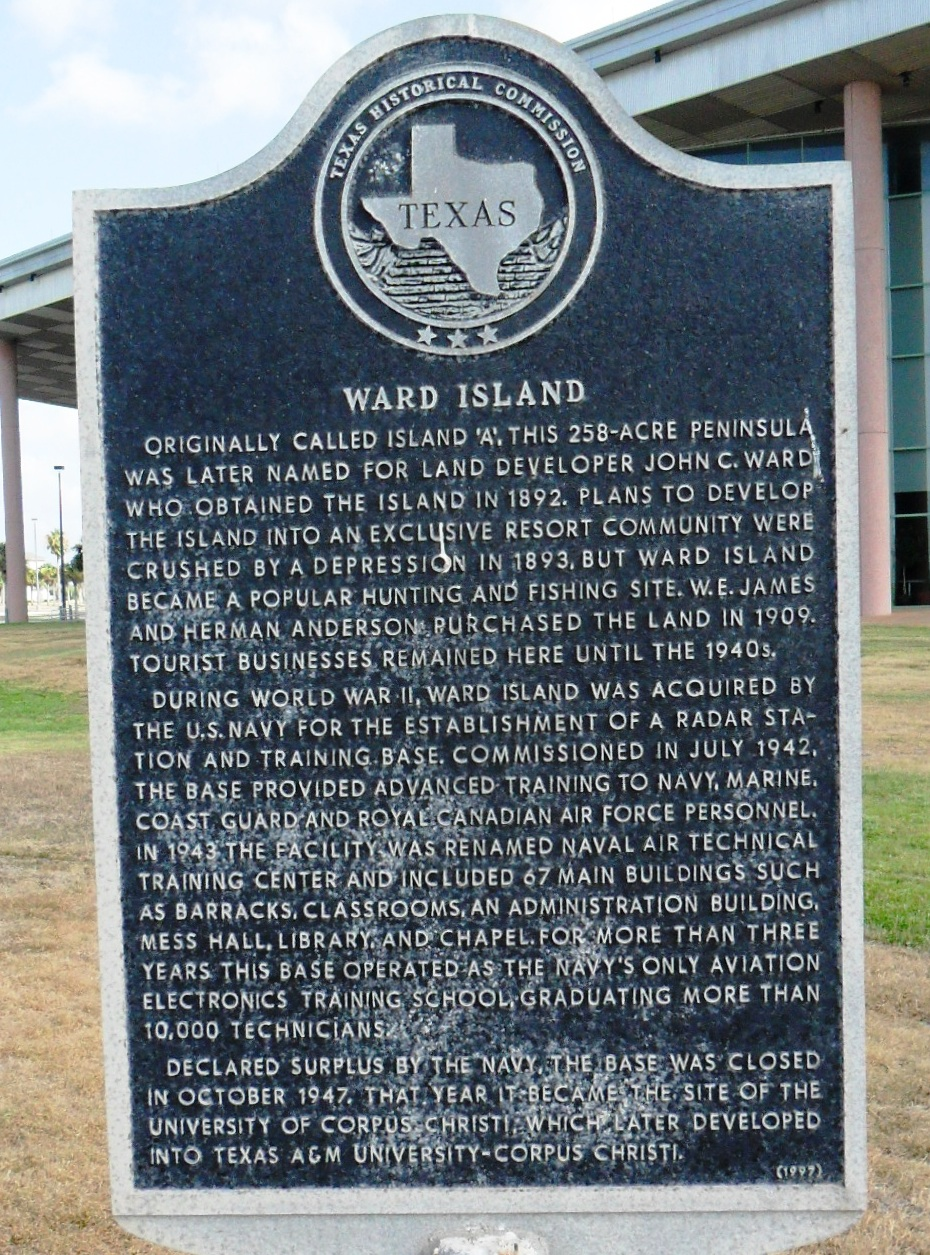
Ward Island historical marker

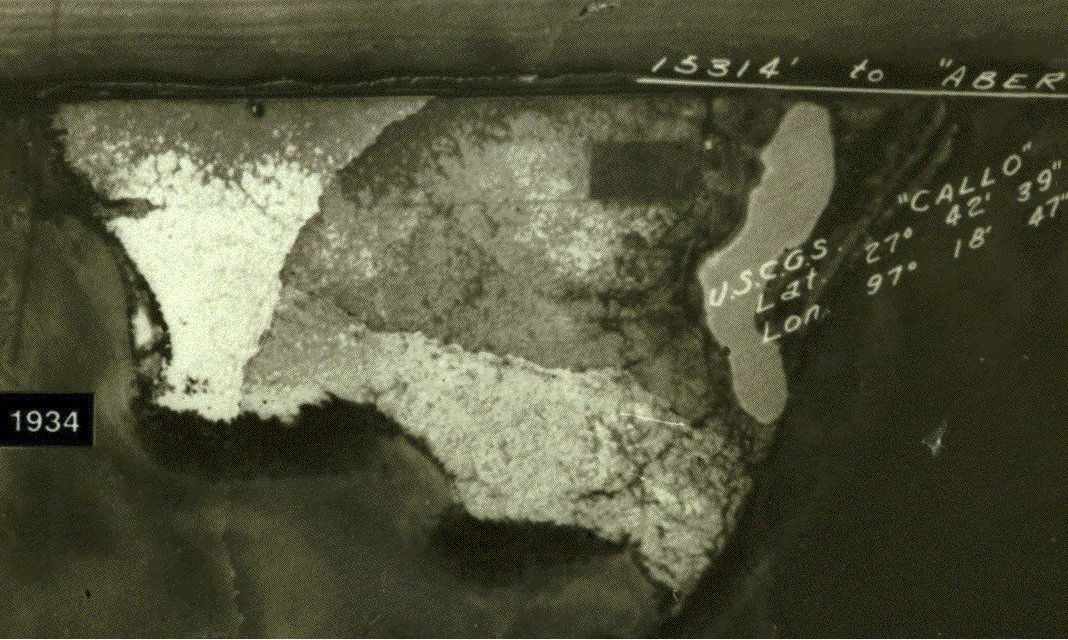
Ward Island in 1934

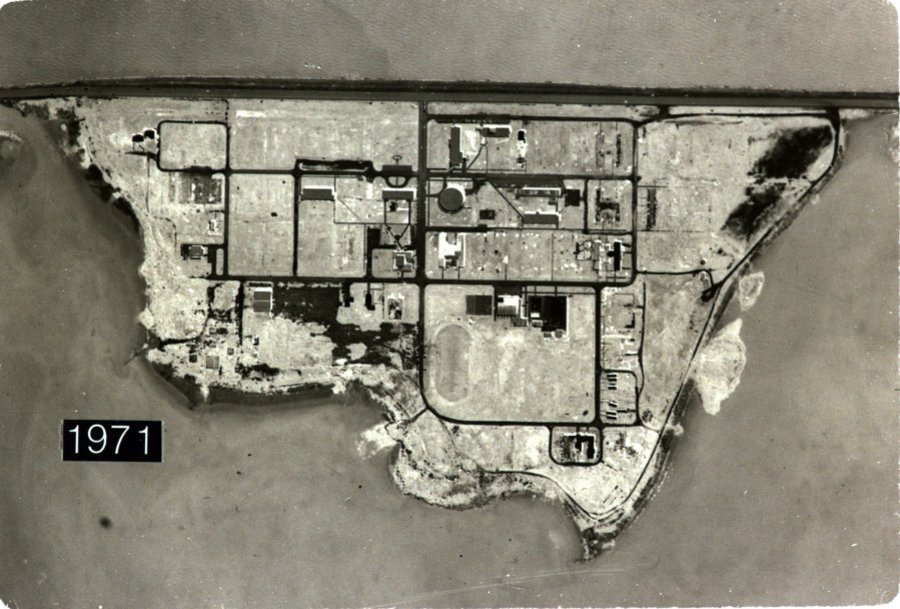
Ward Island in 1971

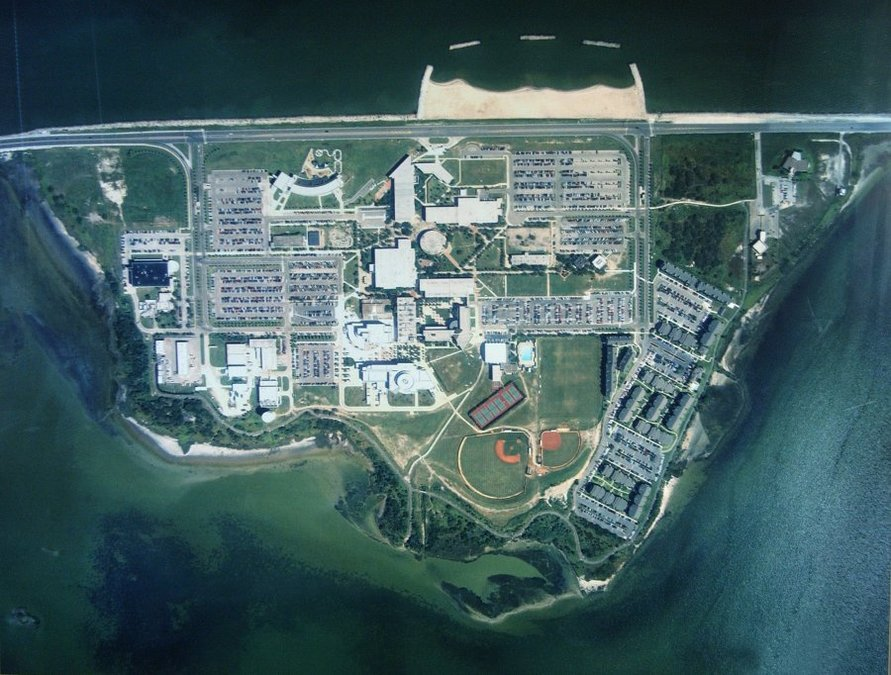
Ward Island in 2002

Originally called "Island A", it was later named for land developer John C. Ward, who obtained the island in 1892. His plans were to develop the habitual area into an exclusive resort community, but the plans were crushed during a depression in 1893; the island, however, still became a popular fishing and hunting site. In 1909, W. E. James and Herman Anderson purchased the land and put up a few rustic shelters as a sportsman business; this remained until the 1940s.

With war looming, the United States Congress directed that the U.S. Navy develop an air training facility in the Corpus Christi Bay vicinity. A huge area of land was acquired at Flour Bluff about 10-mile (16 km) south of downtown Corpus Christi. Construction of Naval Air Station Corpus Christi (NASCC) started in June 1940, and the base was dedicated on March 12, 1941. A major highway was built to the east end of the base, and, for a second entrance, the existing Ocean Drive causeway that passed by Ward Island was improved.

Immediately following the start of World War II, the Navy initiated a major program to train highly qualified technicians to maintain the myriad of electronic systems, particularly radar, that was urgently needed. The then-uninhabited Ward Island was selected as the site of an advanced school for airborne electronics maintenance.

The selection of Ward Island was based on the requirement for isolation and high security, and, although not a part of NASCC, this base was only minutes away and able to provide many of the auxiliary needs of the school. By July 1942, the school was ready and received its first students. Soon named Naval Air Technical Training Center Ward Island, for the remainder of the war it produced, in secrecy, many thousands of Navy, Marine, Coast Guard, and Royal Air Force maintenance personnel. NATTC Ward Island closed in October 1947.

The island almost immediately became a center of higher education. It was first the home of the University of Corpus Christi (1947–1973), and since 1993 has been the home of Texas A&M University-Corpus Christi. In the intervening years, the institutions were Texas A&I at Corpus Christi (1973–1977) and Corpus Christi State University (1977–1993). In addition, in 1973 a small portion of Ward Island was permanently set aside for special university-level religious training; since 2003, this area has been used by the South Texas School for Christian Studies, now known as Stark College & Seminary.

== Naval Air Technical Training Center ==
When World War II started with the Japanese attack on Pearl Harbor (December 7, 1941), the Radio Materiel School (RMS) on the campus of the Naval Research Laboratory (NRL) in Washington D.C. was the only Navy training source of electronic technicians. Although the RMS produced excellent technicians, the curriculum did not include radar, and airborne electronics of any type was missing. Further, the war effort would need thousands of these technicians, and the RML, even with enlarged facilities, graduated only a few hundred per year. An ad hoc committee was immediately formed to address this issue. Under the leadership of William C. Eddy, a medically retired (deafness) submarine officer, a radically new training activity, commonly called the Electronics Training Program (ETP), was devised and actually started January 12, 1942.

=== Electronics Training Program ===
The ETP was initially a two-level training activity: a three-month Primary School, taught by six engineering colleges across the Nation (later three Navy-operated Primary Schools were added), and three Secondary (or Advanced) Schools. Entry into the ETP required passing the Eddy Test. A one-month Pre-Radio School was soon added; this was mainly taught in facilities of junior colleges in the Chicago area. Both the Eddy Test and the subsequent Pre-Radio School were rigorous filters, passing only a small fraction of the most capable candidates. The Primary Schools concentrated the main topics from the first two years of a traditional engineering curriculum into three months of 12-hour instructional days.

The Secondary Schools, all taught by Navy and Marine instructors, were initially five months in length, then increased to six months, and eventually to seven months as additional topics were added. Two of the Secondary Schools centered on shipboard and shore-based electronics; one was a further enlargement of the RMS at the NRL, and the other a duplication of the RMS at Treasure Island in the San Francisco Bay. (In 1944, another duplication was made at Navy Pier in Chicago.) The third initial Secondary School, this one centering on airborne electronics, was at NATTC Ward Island. All of the Secondary Schools operated under high security.

=== Facilities, students, and instruction ===
Located on a causeway southeast of Corpus Christi and northeast of the recently opened Naval Air Station Corpus Christi, Ward Island was an ideal location for the highly secure school. The Navy acquired Ward Island in February 1942, facility construction started in May, and the school was commissioned on July 1. Commander George K. Stoddard was the initial Commanding Officer. An Administration Building, two instructional buildings, five barracks, and two mess halls were ready, but only a part of the 240-acre (0.97-km^{2}) site had been cleared and most streets were unpaved. The unimproved back side was infested by rattlesnakes. Instructional personnel, classroom equipment, and existing students were transferred from a small, similar school that had been started by the Navy Bureau of Aeronautics a few months earlier at the Naval Academy in Annapolis, Maryland. The first new class from Primary Schools was also started at this time.

In September 1942, authority for the school was transferred from the Bureau of Aeronautics to the Air Training Command and it was officially designated the Naval Air Technical Training Center Ward Island (NATTC Ward Island). The first regular class of 106 students graduated in late September, and the following class of 152 students graduated in early October. Thereafter, a new class of 200 students started very two weeks. Beginning in mid-1944, a new class started every week, and the number of students peaked at about 3,100.

Eventually, NATTC Ward Island had 87 buildings, including a dispensary with 34 beds, a 4,000-volume library, a 350-seat chapel, an even larger auditorium (destroyed by fire in early 1946), a well-stocked ship's store, a gymnasium, and a reception center for visitors. There were 17 barracks, several Bachelor Officer Quarters, and 6 mess halls. Outside there were a number of athletic fields and courts (the football field doubled as the parade ground), two swimming pools (every student had to pass a swimming test), and a cross-country track encircling most of the island.

Originally, NATTC Ward Island was primarily intended for training enlisted U.S. Navy and U.S. Marine personnel. The Marine students, along with the Marine guards, were sufficient in number to warrant a Lieutenant Colonel as the Detachment Commander. In a short while, students from the U.S. Coast Guard and from the Royal Air Force in Great Britain were added. The British students would be instructed in separate groups, and occasionally these would have personnel from the Royal Canadian Air Force.

In certain of the segments of the Secondary School, there would occasionally be Warrant and Commissioned Officers. There was an advanced radar school at the Massachusetts Institute of Technology that officers normally attended, but the instruction there did not include airborne systems; thus, officers needing such instruction were sometimes assigned to NATTC Ward Island. Starting in 1943, a special three-month course was given for WAVES supply officers. Throughout the existence of NATTC Ward Island, refresher courses for both officers and enlisted men were continually given.

Instruction in the Secondary School was divided about equally between lecture and laboratory work. Lectures included advanced electronic circuits, microwave theory, servomechanisms and other topics that might normally be in the upper level at engineering colleges. Laboratories included aircraft communication systems, high-frequency and microwave radar systems, identification, friend or foe (IFF) systems, radar altimeters, and long-range navigation (LORAN) equipment. In addition to the regular curriculum, there were special courses on subjects such as the Norden bombsight and the magnetic anomaly detector (MAD), both highly classified at that time, and the Navy's first drone aircraft, the Target Drone Denny 1 (TTD-1).

Except for a small amount of training on equipment during flight, all instruction was conducted within a highly restricted compound under 24-hour guard from the Marine Detachment. The compound, located on the north end of the island, had 16 instructional buildings and a large hangar with static aircraft. For training in flight, there was a hangar and a small fleet of planes at the nearby Naval Air Station.

=== Closure ===
NATTC Ward Island continued for some time after the end of WWII. In mid-1946, a Primary School was added. In its existence, the Secondary School graduated an estimated 10,000 students, many more when the special operations at the NATTC are added. All Navy activities at Ward Island closed in the early fall of 1947, with the instructional program transferring to NATTC Memphis at Millington, Tennessee.

== Higher education center ==
In April 1947, the Baptist General Convention of Texas (BGCT) chartered a school as the Arts and Technological College (ATC). Originally intended to be located in Beeville, Texas, in July this was shifted to Corpus Christi, and ATC temporarily opened in September at Cuddihy Field, a surplus Navy auxiliary airfield on the outskirts of the city. The name was changed to the University of Corpus Christi (UCC) at that time, and the school began with 312 students and 24 faculty members.

=== University of Corpus Christi ===
The Navy closed the NATTC on Ward Island in October 1947, and in November the UCC leased the property, including all of the buildings, for a dollar a year. (The UCC Board of Trustees later obtained full ownership of the property.) During the Christmas break, the school moved from Cuddihy Field to Ward Island and classes restarted in former training buildings on January 5, 1948. The first UCC graduation exercise was held for 29 students in May. For 26 years, UCC was the only four-year, degree-granting institution in Corpus Christi.

For the initial years, the original facilities from NATTC continued to be used for all purposes; the first permanent building, a women's dormitory, came in 1956. The most significant new structure was a large, circular library building opened in May 1963. In 1970, many of the wartime buildings were highly damaged by Hurricane Celia. From its start, the UCC had financial problems, and, to rebuild the campus, the Trustees sought assistance from the State.

The Texas Legislature passed a bill allowing Texas A&I University, located at Kingsville, Texas, to establish an upper-level institute at Corpus Christi. The UCC Trustees then transferred Ward Island to the city of Corpus Christi, which, in turn, transferred it to Texas A&I. The last graduation exercise for UCC was in 1973. In making the land transfer, the BGCT retained 10 acres for student religious centers. Also at the time of the transfer, Corpus Christi incorporated Ward Island into its city limits.

=== Texas A&I at Corpus Christi ===
Texas A&I at Corpus Christi (TAICC) began courses for 969 students at the junior, senior, and graduate levels in the fall of 1973. Many of the damaged buildings were not rebuilt, and thus there was initially no on-campus student housing; intercollegiate athletics were also discontinued. There was a considerable demand in Corpus Christi area, however, for a school providing undergraduate degree-completion and masters-level graduate study. By the start of 1974, TAICC had over 1.200 commuting students and continued to grow in its initial three years. For publicity purposes, it adopted the name Island University.

=== Corpus Christi State University ===
In 1977, the school became a part of the newly created University System of South Texas, and was renamed Corpus Christi State University (CCSU). Although a few dormitories and other permanent facilities were added, CCSU still used many of the original Navy buildings and remained primarily a school for commuting students. Nevertheless, there was steady growth over the next decade. By 1989, the school had more than 4,000 students and over 10,000 alumni.

=== Texas A&M University-Corpus Christi ===
The State Legislature made CCSU a part of the expanding Texas A&M University System in 1989, and in 1992, the Texas Higher Education Commission authorized CCSU's first doctoral program. In 1993, the Texas A&M University System Board of Regents renamed the school Texas A&M University-Corpus Christi (TAMU-CC or A&M-Corpus Christi). With the start of the 1994-1995 academic year, freshmen and sophomore students were also admitted, returning the institution to being a full undergraduate and graduate university. The intercollegiate athletic program was restarted in 1997, with basketball, baseball, tennis, track, and other sports using the name "Islanders" and competing in the Southland Conference.

In the following years, A&M Corpus Christi continued growing in facilities, programs, and students. All of the wooden buildings from the Navy's NATTC were gone; new facilities include extensive student housing, major classroom buildings, a 1,500-seat Performing Arts Center, and the Harte Research Center. Designated as a Hispanic-Serving Institution, as of 2012, there were over 10,000 students from 48 states and 67 foreign countries, and alumni exceeded 30,000. There are five colleges: Business, Education, Liberal Arts, Nursing and Health Sciences, and Science and Engineering. The faculty, administration, and others employees number about 1,400.

=== School of Christian Studies ===
When the Baptist General Convention of Texas sold Ward Island, they retained 10 acres for student religious centers. This plot, just southeast of TAMU-CC's campus, is now occupied by the South Texas School of Christian Studies, an independent agency that describes itself as a "delivery system for religious education". At any given time, hundreds of students are enrolled in graduate, undergraduate, and certificate programs. The Center does not grant degrees itself, but provides educational services on behalf of Hardin-Simmons, Logsdon Seminary, and other accredited institutions.
