= Mick Higgins (Australian footballer) =

Australian rules footballer, born 1911

Personal information
- Full name: Mick Higgins
- Born: 9 August 1911
- Died: 6 September 1989 (aged 78)

Playing career^{1}
Years	Club	Games (Goals)
1933	Footscray	2 (0)
- ^{1} Playing statistics correct to the end of 1933.

Mick Higgins (9 August 1911 – 6 September 1989) was a former Australian rules footballer who played with Footscray in the Victorian Football League (VFL).
