= Archie Leitch =

Australian rules footballer, born 1906

Personal information
- Full name: Archibald Thomas Nevan Leitch
- Born: 12 March 1906; Richmond, Victoria
- Died: 16 September 1989 (aged 83); Richmond, Victoria
- Original team: Moorabbin
- Height: 177 cm (5 ft 10 in)
- Weight: 67 kg (148 lb)

Playing career^{1}
Years	Club	Games (Goals)
1928	Hawthorn	4 (0)
- ^{1} Playing statistics correct to the end of 1928.

Archibald Thomas Nevan Leitch (12 March 1906 – 16 September 1989) was an Australian rules footballer who played for the Hawthorn Football Club in the Victorian Football League (VFL).
