= Norman Morley =

Royal Navy officer (1899-1989)

Norman Eyre Morley
- Born: 6 January 1899; Fulham, London, England
- Died: 21 September 1989 (aged 90); Portsmouth, Hampshire, England
- Military career
- Allegiance: United Kingdom
- Branch: Royal Navy
- Service years: 1916–1919; 1921–1933; 1939–1945
- Rank: Commander
- Conflicts: World War I; Russian Civil War; Baltic Campaign; World War II; Operation Dynamo; Operation Husky; Operation Avalanche; Operation Shingle; Operation Dragoon
- Awards: Distinguished Service Cross & Three Bars; Mentioned in Despatches

Commander Norman Eyre Morley, DSC & Three Bars (6 January 1899 – 21 September 1989) was a British Naval Reserve officer who served in both World Wars, becoming the most decorated reserve officer in the Royal Navy, and the only person to have been awarded the Distinguished Service Cross four times.

== Early life ==
Morley was born in Fulham in 1899, and educated at Battersea Grammar School, before joining the Harrison-Rennie Line as an apprentice.

== World War I and the Baltic ==
Morley joined the Royal Naval Reserve on 14 November 1916 as a midshipman, and served aboard the battleship HMS Iron Duke in the Home Fleet. On 18 February 1919 he was promoted to the acting rank of sub-lieutenant, and served aboard HM Coastal Motor Boat No. 88 in the Baltic. Morley was awarded the Distinguished Service Cross on 11 November 1919 for his part on the attack on Soviet Navy ships in Kronstadt harbour on 18 August 1919, during which No. 88 torpedoed the battleships Andrei Pervozvanny and Petropavlovsk.

== Between the wars ==
From 1920 Morley studied architecture at London University, and then worked for the brewing company Courage, for which he eventually became Chief Architect and Property Technical Director. He also served in the Royal Naval Volunteer Reserve being promoted to sub-lieutenant on 11 October 1921, and lieutenant on 11 April 1924, until being removed from list on 31 March 1933.

== World War II ==
Morley returned to the RNVR soon after the outbreak of the Second World War, being commissioned as a lieutenant on 8 November 1939. He served aboard minesweepers for the entire war, beginning with HMS Hebe, in which he became a First Lieutenant on 18 January 1940, and also took part in the Dunkirk evacuation in May 1940. He was promoted to acting lieutenant-commander in February 1941 and on 18 April 1941 was appointed to command of the minesweeper HMS Eastbourne, based at the Nore. On 31 March 1942 he received a mention in despatches for his "courage, skill and endurance while minesweeping in dangerous waters".

On 12 October 1942 Morley took command of HMS Mutine, taking part in operations in the Mediterranean, and on 23 May 1944 was awarded a bar to the Distinguished Service Cross for his "outstanding courage, resolution, leadership, skill [and] devotion to duty in operations which led to successful landings on the Italian mainland and at Salerno".

On 22 July 1944 Morley was appointed to command of HMS Rhyl and also served as 2nd Senior Officer, 13th Minesweeping Flotilla, transferring to command of HMS Acute and 2nd Senior Officer, 12th Minesweeping Flotilla on 7 December 1944. On 31 January 1945 he was promoted to commander.

On 27 March 1945 Morley was awarded a second bar to the Distinguished Service Cross "for distinguished service and gallantry during the invasion of the South of France", and his third bar on 12 June 1945 "for gallantry, outstanding skill and devotion to duty in minesweeping operations over dense and shallow minefields in the opening up of Greek ports in the Gulf of Corinth".

== Post-war life ==
Morley left the Navy after the end of the war, and returned to civilian employment. He retired in 1964 and bought a farm in Selborne, Hampshire. He was a founder and commodore of the Frensham Pond Sailing Club, continuing to sail into his 80s. Morley died in 1989 aged 90. His medals are held by the Royal Navy Museum at Portsmouth.

== Other awards ==
As well as his four DSCs Morley also received the following campaign medals:

World War I

- Distinguished Service Cross
- British War Medal
- Mercantile Marine War Medal
- Victory Medal

World War II

- Three bars to the DSC
- 1939–1945 Star
- Atlantic Star
- Italy Star
- War Medal 1939–1945 with bronze oak leaf
