= Vail Jewell =

American baseball player

- Second baseman
- Born: May 11, 1910; Paris, Missouri
- Died: September 23, 1989 (aged 79); St. Louis, Missouri
- Threw: Right

Negro league baseball debut
- 1937, for the St. Louis Stars

Last appearance
- 1937, for the St. Louis Stars

Teams
- St. Louis Stars (1937)

Vail Winfred Jewell (May 11, 1910 – September 23, 1989) was an American Negro league second baseman in the 1930s.

A native of Paris, Missouri, Jewell played for the \ in 1937. He died in St. Louis, Missouri in 1989 at age 79.
