= Ardois Light System =

The Ardois light system, or the Ardois Telephotos light system, was a communications system and method used by the U.S. Navy in the late 19th century to enable ship to ship communications at night.

Each installation used a series of eight double lamps (four red and four white) hung vertically from a mast and read from top to bottom, (if mounted horizontally, they were read from the transmitter's right to the left). The code used was effectively a visual version of Morse code, with one color indicating a 'dot' and the other color a 'dash'.

In 1897 the system was improved by adding on a better keyboard, known as the "Telephotos."
