= Ermance Rejebian =

Ermance Rejebian (March 17, 1906 - September 29, 1989) was an Armenian American woman who captivated Texas audiences with her ardor as a book reviewer, lecturer, broadcaster, and writer. During her 40+ year career, she inspired dozens of book clubs (known as Rejebian Book Clubs and also under various affiliated names) and wrote two books detailing her and her husband's struggles amidst the Armenian genocide.

== Personal life ==
Ermance Rejebian was born Ermance Marion Varsaverian in the Ottoman Empire on March 17, 1906. Her father was a prominent lawyer for the Ottoman government as well as a leader in the Armenian community. Her mother came from landed gentry. Rejebian was the second of three daughters born to them. Mr. Varsaverian longed to bring his family to America and away from the tensions between the Turks and Armenians. During World War One, as the Armenian genocide was exploding throughout the region, Mr. Varsaverian moved his family to Constantinople to escape imminent danger. The family settled there and in 1919, Rejebian's father sent her and a friend to England to live and to learn English.

Rejebian's sister, Anahid, married an American and settled down in Los Angeles. In 1920, she sent for her younger sister, and Rejebian moved in with the couple. She shortened her maiden name to Verian and attended L.A. High School, from which she was awarded a diploma in 1924. She then attended the University of California, Southern Branch (now UCLA), earning an elementary grade teacher's certification in January 1927. She worked as a teacher until her marriage to Vahram Rejebian in 1928.

Ermance and Vahram moved to Houston shortly after their marriage, and their son Myron was born there in 1930. Four years later, in 1934, the family moved to Dallas, a city which Ermance and Vahram fell in love with immediately. Daughter Mary was born in Dallas in 1936. It was around this time that Ermance Rejebian met Etta Mae Pickens, who planted the idea for the Rejebian Club. Rejebian was also a prolific writer, authoring hundreds of pages on various topics from culture and history to her own personal travel experiences. After the popularity of the Rejebian Clubs took off, Ermance gave speeches all over Texas, including institutions such as Southern Methodist University, Texas Wesleyan University, and even once to an audience of 1,500 in Houston. The Rejebians were avid travelers later in life, often returning to the cities of their birth, as well as many other cities throughout the world.

Ermance Rejebian resided in Dallas until her death on September 29, 1989.

== Rejebian Clubs ==
In Dallas in the 1930s, book reviews were a very popular form of entertainment and women formed various clubs at which they would gather to listen to a reviewer speak. At one such club in late 1936, Mrs. Etta Mae Pickens first heard Ermance Rejebian speak. Rejebian had previously heard another reviewers telling of The Forty Days of Musa Dagh and was disillusioned with that reviewers' lack of knowledge of the Armenian culture and history, so she gave her own review at the Dallas Story League. Pickens was highly impressed and, upon meeting Rejebian again in the summer of 1937, asked to join Rejebian's club. Upon discovering that a club did not exist, Pickens suggested they start a club. The two worked together to get the club set up and before long, Rejebian's intelligent and passionate oratory drew in many more people and the women instituted a waiting list. Soon after, several other clubs were formed, with Redjebian taking turns speaking at all of them because the waiting list grew too long. Over a number of years, 40+ clubs appeared, using Redjebian's name. She gave an average of 42 reviews a month for the first 34 years of her career, before having to cut down well into her 60s.

== Other works and awards ==
During this busy time, Rejebian also spent seven years giving a brief summary of the news on WFAA AM radio on Sunday mornings. She wrote three books during the course of her life: Testament of Faith, her own story, Pilgrimage to Freedom, her husband's, and The Book, her years of Bible study. In 1959, the Daughters of the American Revolution, Jane Douglas Chapter, honored her with the Americanism Medal. That same year, Time magazine named her one of the Outstanding Women of the Southwest. Four years later, in 1963, she won the Zonta Service Award.
