= Vic Nankervis (footballer, born 1918) =

Australian rules footballer (1918–1985)

Personal information
- Full name: Victor Andrew Nankervis
- Born: 17 November 1918; Chilwell
- Died: 5 October 1985 (aged 66); Geelong West, Victoria

Playing career^{1}
Years	Club	Games (Goals)
1941	Geelong	2 (2)
1942	Footscray	2 (3)
1943	St Kilda	7 (6)
1944–1945	Geelong	31 (55)
1946	South Melbourne	4 (2)
Total		46 (68)
- ^{1} Playing statistics correct to the end of 1946.

Victor Andrew Nankervis (17 November 1918 – 5 October 1985) was an Australian rules footballer who played with Geelong, Footscray, St Kilda and South Melbourne in the Victorian Football League (VFL) during the 1940s.

Nankervis enlisted in 1940 and due to his commitments with the Australian Army would initially only appear sporadically in the VFL. He played for three clubs in his first three seasons, for a total of 11 games.

A rover, he returned to his original club, Geelong, in 1944 and made 12 appearances. The following year he had his best season, with 43 goals from 19 games. His goals tally included seven in a game against Footscray and was enough to top Geelong's goal-kicking.

He was the son of Geelong footballer Stephen Nankervis.
