= Doug Munro (footballer) =

Australian rules footballer (1917–1989)

Personal information
- Full name: Douglas Thomas Munro
- Born: 7 February 1917; South Melbourne, Victoria
- Died: 18 September 1989 (aged 72)
- Original teams: Ascot Vale, Essendon Seconds
- Height: 177 cm (5 ft 10 in)
- Weight: 79 kg (174 lb)

Playing career^{1}
Years	Club	Games (Goals)
1937	Essendon	1 (0)
- ^{1} Playing statistics correct to the end of 1937.

Douglas Thomas Munro (7 February 1917 – 18 September 1989) was an Australian rules footballer who played with Essendon in the Victorian Football League (VFL).

== Family ==
The son of Douglas Sutherland Bennett Munro (1892-1953), and Julia Catherine Munro (1885-1980), née Herlihy, Douglas Thomas Munro was born at South Melbourne, Victoria on 7 February 1917.

He married Edna Elsie Wilson (1909-2000) in 1939.

== Football ==
=== Essendon (VFL) ===
He was cleared from Ascot Vale to Essendon Seconds in 1935, and was listed to train with the Essendon Second XVIII in April 1936.

Injured at the beginning of the 1937 season, his only senior game for Essendon was in the final home-and-away match of the 1937 season, against South Melbourne, at the Lake Oval on 28 August 1937.

=== Fitzroy (VFL) ===
He was cleared from Essendon to Fitzroy on 6 July 1939.
