= Eddy Test =

Eddy Test was the common name for a test given throughout World War II and for several years thereafter, to identifying men with the capability and aptitude for being trained in the enlisted ranks as electronics maintenance technicians in the U.S. Navy and U.S. Marine Corps. Developed by William C. Eddy, the official name was Radio Technician Selection Test (RTST, Nav Pers 16578), but this designation was rarely used.

Passing the Eddy Test served as the passport to the Electronics Training Program, possibly the best technical training program then available in the armed services.

== Background ==
Since 1924, the Radio Materiel School (RMS), located on the campus of the Naval Research Laboratory (NRL) in Washington, D.C., had provided advanced maintenance training for selected men with a rating of electrician's mate or radioman in the U.S. Navy and Coast Guard. Admission required years of experience as an apprentice (then called a "striker") and passing a very difficult examination. The RMS graduated about 100 men per year, usually with a rating of petty officer first class. (Entertainer Arthur Godfrey was a 1929 Coast Guard graduate.)

As the 1940s began and the Navy prepared for the expected war, thousands of new ships, aircraft, submarines, and shore stations were being built, all needing electronics technicians. Also, there had been major advances in electronics, requiring technicians who had much better knowledge of theory. Thus, the existing RMS was inadequate and an entirely new training program was needed.

With the December 7, 1941, attack on Pearl Harbor, the urgency of a solution became highly critical. An ad hoc group in Washington, D.C., was developing a training plan and immediately began a crash effort. They were joined by William C. Eddy, a medically retired officer (deafness) and a recognized authority in electronics. (Eddy would shortly reenter active duty, and during the war years rise to the rank of captain).

In a few days, a plan was developed for what would be commonly called the Electronics Training Program (ETP). A vital element of the ETP would be the selection of students. These would mainly come from volunteers and draftees who, unlike the RMS students from the Regular Navy, would not have experience as apprentices; therefore, a comprehensive classification examination was needed for admission. Eddy volunteered to lead the development of this examination – thus, the name Eddy Test.

== Application ==
The ETP involved a Primary School (officially called EE & RM School) that, in 12 weeks of 14-hour instructional days, covered the basics of electrical engineering, including the related mathematics; this was initially given by a number of engineering colleges and universities. Primary was followed by a Secondary School (officially called Advanced Radio Materiel School), giving advanced theory and laboratory work on actual hardware; several new Navy-operated schools, including an upgraded RMS, provided this instruction.

The ETP was reported to be the most intense and difficult technical instruction ever given to enlisted personnel. Therefore, the Eddy Test needed to identify students with the basic capability and psychological fitness to pursue such instruction. The test was noted to have been very successful for this purpose.

January 12, 1942, a prototype Primary School was opened using laboratories of Eddy's experimental television station in the "Loop" of downtown Chicago. Initial students were admitted on the basis of prior radio experience, and were also tested against a draft of the Eddy Test. The prototype school quickly evolved into an extensive operation called Radio Chicago; its functions included centralized grading all of the Eddy Tests. Eddy and his staff wrote a book to help people prepare for the test. Even after filtering with the Eddy Test, there was initially an unacceptably high failure rate in Primary School; thus, Radio Chicago added a 4-week Pre-Radio School, concentrating on physics, mathematics, and the slide rule, conducted by taking over several local junior colleges and high schools.

There are no records of the number of people taking the Eddy Test during WW II, but this is estimated to have been 500,000 or more. In an interview, Eddy stated that 86,000 persons "received training", possibly indicating that this number passed the test. Captain Eddy's Legion of Merit citation states that through 1945 some 30,000 technicians completed the ETP. These numbers show that only a small fraction initially passed the Eddy Test, and that, even with this, the failure rate in the overall program was some 60 percent.

There was a hard, universally used pass-fail criterion for the Eddy Test, and a second chance was normally never allowed. Eddy described the test as having questions with multiple-choice answers, with each of the answers giving some indication of the test-taker's mathematics/physics knowledge, creativity, reasoning ability, and general aptitude. Most answers were weighted – not simply right or wrong – and speed certainly affected the results. No copies of the actual test have been found.

== Meaning and reliability ==
In early 1943, the Test and Research Section, Bureau of Naval Personnel, made an in-depth study of 660 students in Primary and Secondary Schools at the Naval Research Laboratory. The results were published later in the journal American Psychologist. The stated purpose of the study was "an endeavor to identify some of the characteristics of men who were successful in completing training." It was noted that "in such an extensive training program as that for radio technicians which demands a high degree of concentration and ability, the Navy could ill afford to spend several months training men who, because of lack of ability, were unable to complete the training."

Among other factors, the grades on the Otis Test were examined. It is stated in the paper that the mean score "for an unselected adult population is 42, with a possible score of 75. The average for the 660 students was 67.1." The high average led to administering the Officer Qualification Test to a group of 282 graduating students. The overall conclusion was that "the trainees rank well above the average enlisted man, pushing close to the ceiling of enlisted tests ... and they were also distinctly above the mean [value] for the officer population."

It has been cited elsewhere that ETP students scored an average of near 68 on the Otis Test. While this test does not directly indicate an intelligence score, it does indicate that personnel in the ETP were in the upper three percent of the population; this roughly corresponds to about 130 on the Stanford–Binet intelligence quotient scale.

The study indicated that the several forms of the initial RTST (Eddy Test) was somewhat lacking in internal consistency (there was a Kuder–Richardson Formula 20 value of 21%). The tests were subsequently improved to become 82 to 89%.

== Updated test ==
In 1951, the Bureau of Naval Personnel contracted with the Advanced School of Education, Teachers College, Columbia University, to develop a new Electronic Technician Selection Test (ETST). The contract called for this to be "somewhat less difficult than the RTST, with a maximum discrimination at or near the seventy-fifth percentage of the general high school population."
