= Vic Nankervis (footballer, born 1893) =

Australian rules footballer (1893–1973)

Personal information
- Full name: Victor Alfred Percival Nankervis
- Born: 4 January 1893; Collingwood, Victoria
- Died: 17 March 1973 (aged 80); Ivanhoe, Victoria
- Original team: Balmain Juniors

Playing career^{1}
Years	Club	Games (Goals)
1915, 1918	Essendon	6 (0)
1918	Fitzroy	2 (1)
Total		8 (1)
- ^{1} Playing statistics correct to the end of 1918.

Victor Alfred Percival Nankervis (4 January 1893 – 17 March 1973) was an Australian rules footballer who played with Essendon and Fitzroy in the Victorian Football League (VFL).

Nankervis appeared in the final five rounds of the 1915 VFL season and didn't play again until the 1918 VFL season, when Essendon returned to the league after a two-year absence. He played just once in 1918 and finished the season at Fitzroy, playing two further games.

He served with the 4th Australian Light Anti-Aircraft Regiment during World War II.

Two of his nephews, Bruce and Ian, had long careers playing for Geelong.
