= William C. Eddy =

American cartoonist

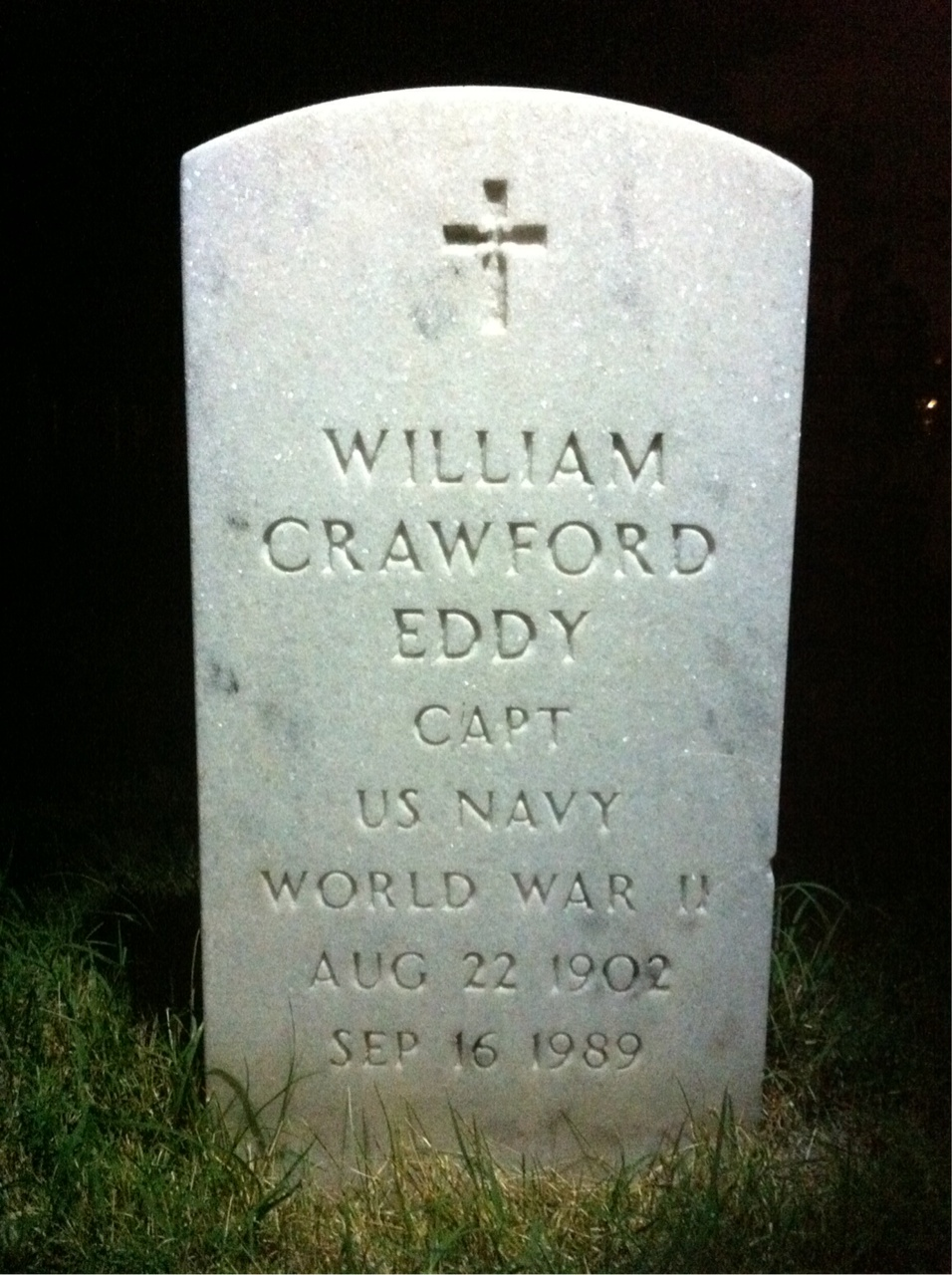
Grave at Arlington National Cemetery

William Crawford Eddy (August 22, 1902 – September 15, 1989) was an American naval officer, submariner, engineer, television producer, educator, cartoonist, artist, inventor, entrepreneur, explorer and writer.

Bill Eddy was born and raised in Saratoga Springs, New York, where his father was a businessman and four-term mayor. He completed high school at the New York Military Academy, then received an appointment to the United States Naval Academy. With minimal hearing capability, he passed the physical examination by "reading lips," then kept this deficiency hidden throughout his years at the academy and during his initial military service.

== Early career ==
Upon graduating from the Naval Academy in 1926, Eddy's first assignment as an ensign was on the light cruiser USS Cincinnati (CL-6). He was initially sent to Nicaragua to "fight the Banana Wars," then dispatched to China to protect American interests and "show the flag" along the Yangtze River. In 1928, Eddy requested and received a transfer to the submarine service. At six-foot six, he was almost too tall for submarines, but nevertheless received an assignment on the USS S-35, patrolling the Asiatic waters from the Philippines. To compensate for his hearing problem, he designed a visual display for audio tracking signals; this apparatus was widely used on submarines for many years. When Eddy learned that the Navy needed a suitable badge for the submarine service, being a talented artist he designed the "Dolphins" insignia; this was adopted and is still proudly worn by eligible personnel.

In 1930, Eddy was sent to the Naval Submarine Base New London in Connecticut. Here he qualified as a submarine commander and was promoted to lieutenant (junior grade). Remaining at New London, Eddy set up an electronics course for officers. He had his own laboratory for conducting research in underwater sound gear and signal communicating from a submerged position; his research resulted in four secret patents. When standing a physical examination for promotion to lieutenant, his hearing loss came to light, and he was forced into disability retirement at the close of 1934.

In early 1935, Eddy joined Philo T. Farnsworth, the inventor of fully electronic television, in his new research operations in Philadelphia, Pennsylvania. While he soon made engineering contributions in developing new equipment, it was with Farnsworth's experimental television station, W3XPF, where he gained wide recognition. He essentially "wrote the book" for the emerging studio activities, setting the stage for television operations over the next years.

To address his hearing loss, Eddy developed a miniature electronic device connected to a vibrating element concealed inside an unlit pipe. When held between his teeth, the device transmitted sound through his jaw to his inner ear. He continued to use the pipe for the rest of his life.

Having gained a reputation at W3XPF, Eddy was recruited by RCA, Farnsworth's main rival. In 1937, he joined RCA's experimental station W2XBS in New York City. Here, Eddy applied for 43 patents and received wide recognition for his accomplishments. Among other television studio innovations, he is credited with creating the field of sight effects – using miniatures, special sets, and innovative lighting to greatly broaden the telecast scenes.

Now one of the most recognized television authorities in America, Eddy was invited by the Balaban and Katz theater chain to initiate electronic television broadcasting in Chicago. In April 1941, he opened W9XBK as an experimental station, operating from facilities in the Chicago Loop district. Although there were only a few hundred television receivers in the area, Eddy inaugurated many technical and programming innovations, including the use of a remote unit with a high-frequency link to telecast live sports events.

== Wartime activities ==
On December 7, 1941, when Eddy heard about the Japanese attack on Pearl Harbor, he took a night train from Chicago to Washington, D.C., intent on returning to active duty as a Navy officer. The next day, with an unlit pipe clenched in his teeth, he searched through the chaos in the Navy Department, trying to find a receptive ear. Eventually he found a senior officer in the Training Division of the Bureau of Navigation who had heard of Eddy's television accomplishments.

When the officer told Eddy that highly skilled personnel were desperately needed to maintain a new type of high-frequency radio equipment, Eddy responded, "You'll need lots of radar men. We can train 'em. We've got room, equipment, skilled personnel – you can have it all!" (Radar was then highly classified, but Eddy was aware of it because engineers at W9XBK had been recruited by the Navy for this activity.) A small ad hoc group was already immersed in searching for solutions to the crisis in training issue – radar was on the way into the fleet, and there was only a handful of personnel with any knowledge of its maintenance. Eddy was invited to join this planning group and quickly became the leader.

In less than a month, Eddy's group had developed plans for what came to be recognized as the most challenging training program of WWII. Popularly called the Electronics Training Program (ETP), this had a three-month Primary School, followed by a five- or six-month Secondary School, both involving unbelievable 15-hour study days. The Primary, covering the major topics normally in the first two years of an electrical engineering curriculum, was initially given by six engineering colleges distributed across the U.S. The Secondary, involving advanced topics (such as microwave theory) and secret-level laboratory experience on radar and related equipment, was at three highly secure Navy facilities: one at the Naval Research Laboratory in Washington, D.C.; a similar facility on Treasure Island in the San Francisco Bay; and the third (for airborne systems) at Ward Island near the Naval Air Station Corpus Christi, Texas. Later during the war, schools at other locations were added.

Admission to the ETP was through passing a comprehensive, psychologically probing examination commonly called the Eddy Test. Throughout the war years, it is estimated that some 500,000 persons took the Eddy Test, but only about 30,000 passed, survived the courses, and eventually graduated from the program. In a journal article, it was indicated that the average passing students were in the top two percent of Intelligence Quotient (IQ) in the nation. The Commander of Treasure Island stated that ETP students represented the top three to five percent of all Navy personnel.

The ETP was initiated on January 12, 1942, in a prototype Primary School using the facilities of W9XBK on the top floors of the State-Lake Theater Building on the Loop in downtown Chicago. Eddy was returned to active duty, and in less than three years was promoted to the rank of captain. The greatly enlarged activities became Naval Training Schools – Radio Chicago, and were under the command of Eddy for the duration of the war.

In 1943, Radio Chicago took over two junior colleges and several other facilities in the area to provide month-long preparatory/filtering Pre-Radio Schools, each for about 1,000 entering students. To prepare potential students, Eddy personally led a team in writing a nationally used refresher book on mathematics. Radio Chicago also had a special school for program instructors.

At the end of the war, Eddy declined a further promotion to rear admiral and retired (again) in December 1945. He was awarded the Legion of Merit for his wartime accomplishments. An article in the IEEE Spectrum, a leading electrical engineering magazine, heralded these accomplishments, crediting Eddy with a major contribution to the post-war educational boom in this field.

== Post-Navy accomplishments ==
Throughout his time with Radio Chicago, Eddy had maintained a "moonlighting" relationship with the local experimental television station. Eddy was hired away from RCA technologies in the fall of 1940, to work for Paramount pictures. He was bet by executives at NBC that he couldn't start a television station and get in on the air within six months. Unlike the usual $500,000 it takes to get a station up and running, Eddy was able to start W9XBX for $60,000, and within five months, leading it in 1943 to become WBKB – Chicago's first commercial station. He authored a book, Television: The Eyes of Tomorrow, that defined TV operations for the next decade.

On leaving the Navy, Eddy resumed control of WBKB, and almost immediately established an operation that was historically noteworthy. In addition to continuing with his technical and production innovations, Eddy initiated many highly popular programs, including Junior Jamboree (puppeteers, later becoming Kukla, Fran and Ollie), the Chicago Zoo with Marlin Perkins (later Wild Kingdom), news with Hugh Downs, and the first live broadcasts of many sports: baseball (Chicago Cubs remote from Wrigley Field), college football (University of Notre Dame remote from South Bend), boxing, wrestling, and golf.

In 1947, Eddy formed Television Associates of Indiana, headquartered in Michigan City, Indiana, eventually with 200 employees. This firm developed equipment and techniques for geographical surveys using low-flying aircraft. For this, Eddy earned a private pilot license and handled the plane for most of the test flights. This activity grew into a four-aircraft service, mapping profiles along 25,000 route-miles all over the world, including a 3,000-mile track through Turkey, Iran, Iraq, and Pakistan. An inventive genius, Eddy led his firm in many electronic developments, including a continuous-loop, eight-track player for the Navy. Eddy was awarded even more patents, including one for the Turnpike Pacer (what is today the automobile cruise control).

In 1961, Television Associates was acquired by Westinghouse Air Brake Company and merged with its subsidiary Melpar, one of the most prominent technology firms of that time. Television Associates was maintained as a Melpar subsidiary, with Eddy serving as board chairman and President. There were eight overseas offices, and Eddy spent much time in travel. Melpar was sold in 1972, and Television Associates was then dissolved.

== Personal life ==
At age 70, Eddy's professional career ended, but he remained very active in personal pursuits, retiring to Michigan City, Indiana. For 33 years, starting in the 1930s, he had designed annual calendars for Honeywell's Brown Instruments. In retirement, he continued as an accomplished cartoonist and visual artist, winning awards for his oil paintings, ceramic sculptures, stained glass creations, and computer-generated art. A skilled sailor, Eddy owned a custom-built Chinese junk ship and sailed it all over Lake Michigan. He cared deeply for animals, and his last major activity was operating a small preserve for injured creatures.

Eddy met his future wife, Christine Woolridge, when she was traveling the world, and they were married in July 1927, in Hankow, China. They had three children, Nancy; William C., Jr.; and Dianna. Captain William Crawford Eddy died in Michigan City on September 15, 1989, and was buried at Arlington National Cemetery.
