= Electrician's Mate =

Occupational rating in the U.S. Navy and U.S. Coast Guard

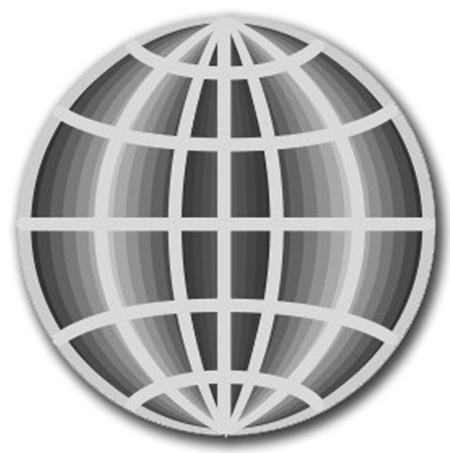
- Rating insignia
- Issued by: United States Navy
- Type: Enlisted rating
- Abbreviation: EM
- Specialty: Engineering

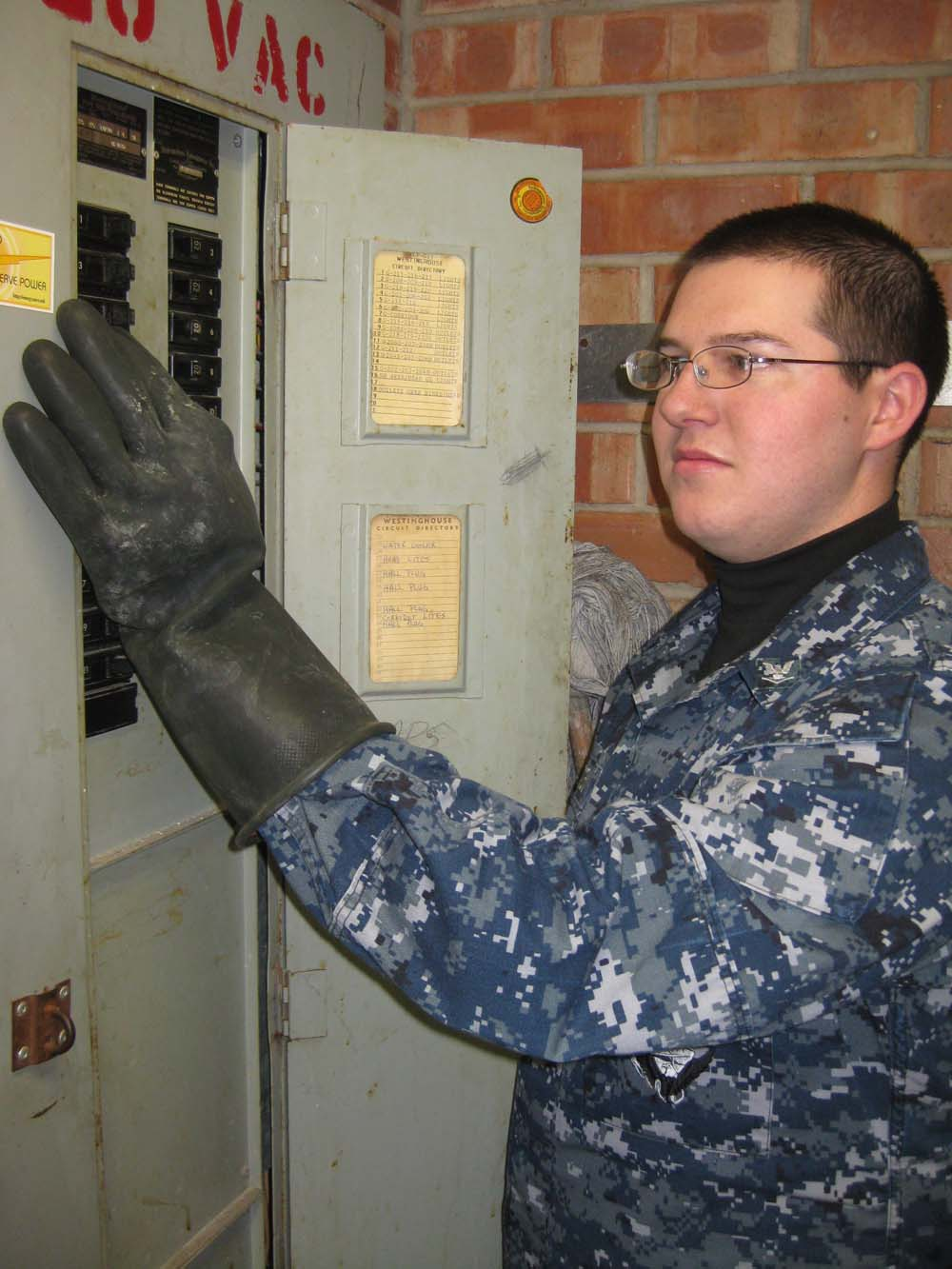
An Electrician's Mate operating a 115-volt breaker

Electrician's Mate (abbreviated as EM) is a United States Navy and United States Coast Guard occupational rating. The Electrician's Mate's NOS is B210.

== History ==
The Navy Electrician rating was established in 1883, then promptly disestablished in 1884, only to be re-established as a Navy rating in 1898. The Electrician rating changed to its current name, Electrician's Mate, in 1921.

== Duties ==
Electrician's Mates stand watch on generators, switchboards, control equipment and electrical equipment; operate and perform organizational and intermediate maintenance on power and lighting circuits, electrical fixtures, motors, generators, voltage and frequency regulators, controllers, distribution switchboards and other electrical equipment; test for short circuits, ground or other casualties; and rebuild electrical equipment, including solid state circuitry elements, in an electrical shop.

== Requirements ==
Electrician's Mate class "A" school is approximately 18 weeks long, and the school is located in Great Lakes, Illinois. The EM rating requires a 5-year minimum enlistment contract.

Select recruits, upon arriving to Recruit Training Command, are able to choose from one of three nuclear power rates, one of which is Electrican's Mate, Nuclear Power (EMN). After boot camp, they attend the Naval Nuclear Power Training Command and are then employed onboard nuclear-powered ships and submarines to maintain the control of electrical systems and subsystems for nuclear reactors.

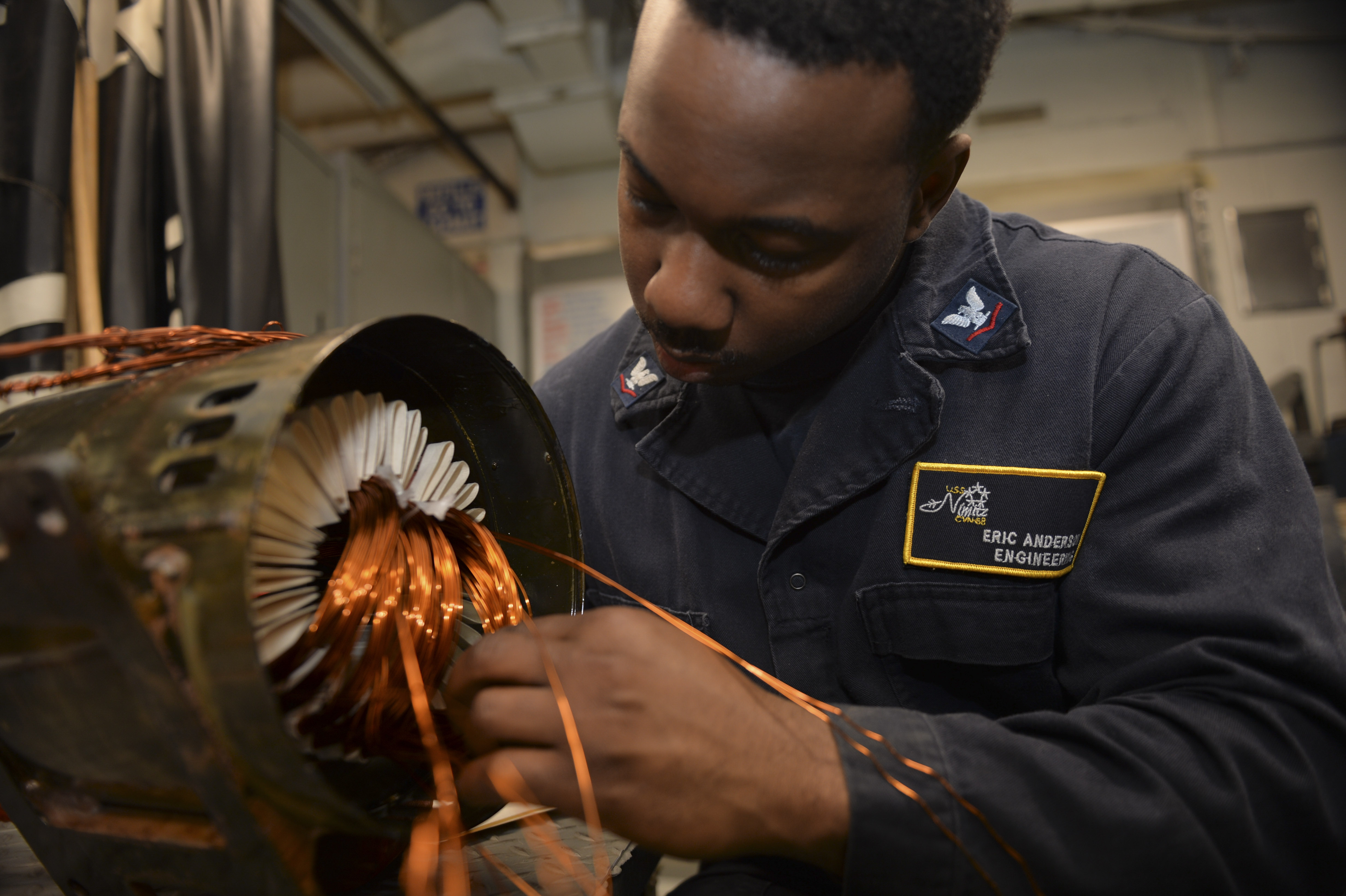
Electrician's Mate, Nuclear Power, 3rd Class Eric Anderson rewiring the coils of a motor

The Nuclear Electrician's Mate (EMN) "A" school is located in Goose Creek, South Carolina. This training is 6 months long, and is followed by an additional 6-month "Power" school, then 6 months of "Prototype" operational reactor time continued in Goose Creek or in Ballston Spa, New York. The EMN rating requires a minimum 6-year enlistment contract.

The Armed Services Vocational Aptitude Battery (ASVAB) overall score must be 50, with an additional requirement of a minimum value based on the sum of the following topics:

- Word Knowledge
- Paragraph Comprehension
- Arithmetic Reasoning
- Mathematics Knowledge
- Mechanical Comprehension

The ASVAB minimum scores for any nuclear rate, including EMN, are based on the sum of the line scores from the following topics on the ASVAB:

- Verbal
- Arithmetic Reasoning
- Mathematics Knowledge
- Mechanical Comprehension
- Electronics Information
- General Science

Depending on score, an additional test called the Navy Advanced Programs Test (NAPT) may be required.

== See also ==
- List of United States Coast Guard ratings
- List of United States Navy ratings
