= Stephen Nankervis =

Australian rules footballer

Personal information
- Full name: Stephen Nankervis
- Born: 11 February 1890; Daylesford, Victoria
- Died: 6 September 1989 (aged 99)
- Height: 175 cm (5 ft 9 in)
- Weight: 67 kg (148 lb)

Playing career^{1}
Years	Club	Games (Goals)
1912–13	Geelong	4 (2)
- ^{1} Playing statistics correct to the end of 1913.

Stephen Nankervis (11 February 1890 – 6 September 1989) was an Australian rules footballer who played with Geelong in the Victorian Football League (VFL).
