= Bureau of Navigation =

American government agency enforcing maritime law (1884–1946)

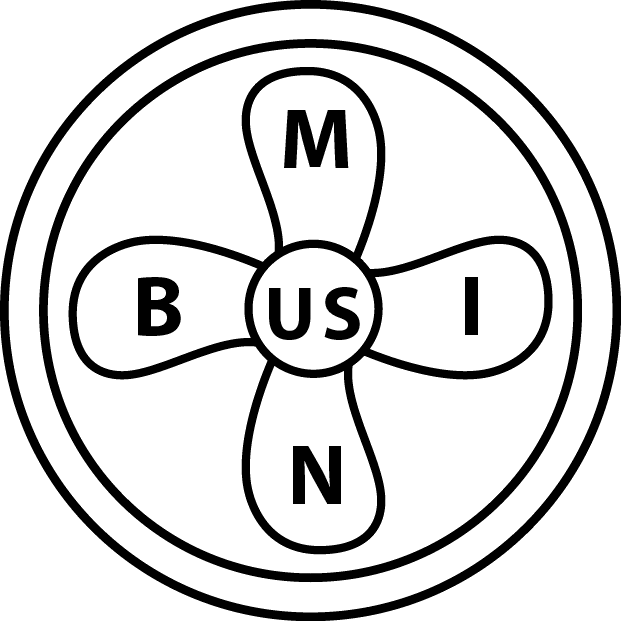
- The seal of the Bureau of Marine Inspection and Navigation, as the bureau was known from 1936 until its abolition.

- Flag of the Bureau of Navigation

Agency overview
- Formed: 1884
- Dissolved: 1946
- Superseding agency: United States Coast Guard and United States Customs Service
- Jurisdiction: Federal government of the United States
- Headquarters: Washington, D.C.
- Parent agency: United States Department of the Treasury (1884–1903); United States Department of Commerce and Labor (1903–1913); United States Department of Commerce (1913–1946)

Footnotes
- Known as the Bureau of Navigation and Steamboat Inspection 1932–1936 and as the Bureau of Marine Inspection and Navigation 1936–1946.

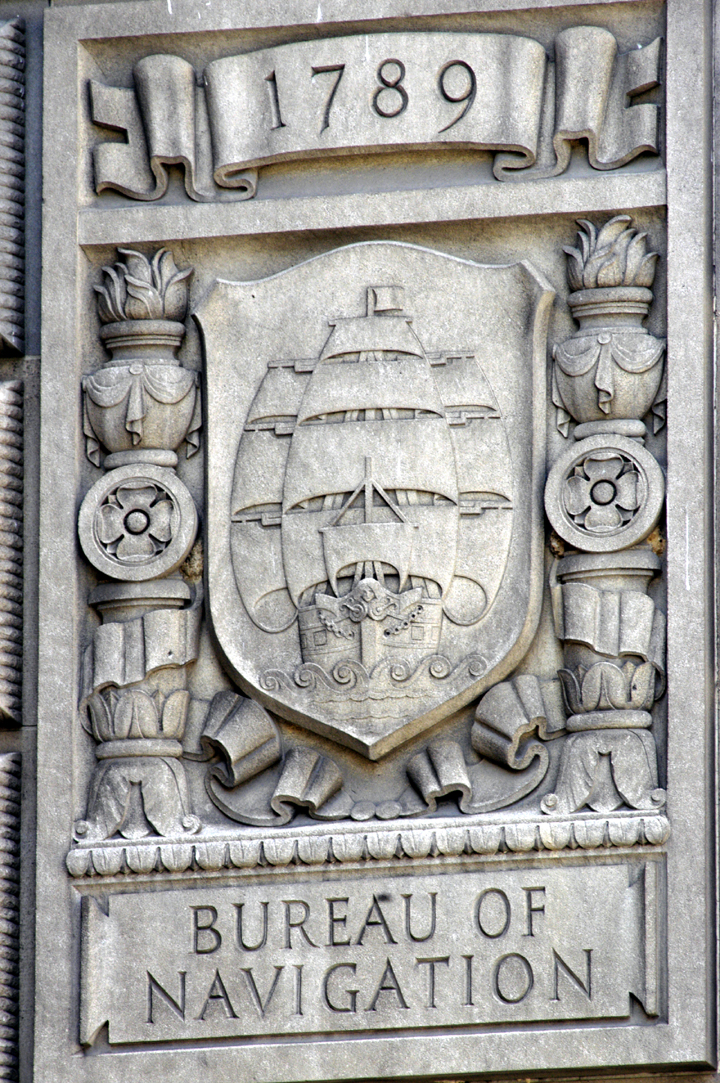
Sculptured relief on the facade of the United States Department of Commerce Building in Washington, D.C.

The Bureau of Navigation, later the Bureau of Navigation and Steamboat Inspection and finally the Bureau of Marine Inspection and Navigation — not to be confused with the United States Navy's Bureau of Navigation — was an agency of the United States Government established in 1884 to enforce laws relating to the construction, equipment, operation, inspection, safety, and documentation of merchant vessels. The bureau also investigated marine accidents and casualties; collected tonnage taxes and other navigation fees; and examined, certified, and licensed merchant mariners.

When established, the Bureau of Navigation was a part of the United States Department of the Treasury. In 1903, the organization was transferred to the newly formed United States Department of Commerce and Labor. In 1913 that department was split into the United States Department of Commerce and the United States Department of Labor, and the bureau was assigned to the new Department of Commerce. In 1932 the bureau was combined with the Steamboat Inspection Service to form the Bureau of Navigation and Steamboat Inspection. The Bureau of Navigation and Steamboat Inspection was in turn renamed the Bureau of Marine Inspection and Navigation in 1936.

In 1942, Executive Order 9083 transferred many functions of the bureau to two other agencies: Merchant vessel documentation was transferred to the United States Customs Service, while functions relating to merchant vessel inspection, safety of life at sea, and merchant mariners were transferred to the United States Coast Guard. The merchant vessel documentation functions were also transferred to the Coast Guard in 1946.

With all its functions having been absorbed by the U.S. Customs Service and the U.S. Coast Guard, the Bureau of Marine Inspection and Navigation was abolished as unnecessary and redundant by Reorganization Plan No. III of 1946.

== Flags ==
Ships of the Bureau of Navigation, the Bureau of Navigation and Steamboat Inspection, and the Bureau of Marine Inspection and Navigation flew a blue flag with a white three-masted sailing ship within a red disc. Ships of the bureau with the director of the bureau embarked also flew the director's flag, which featured the same white three-masted sailing ship on a completely blue field.

The flag of the Bureau of Navigation.

Flag of the Director of the Bureau of Marine Inspection and Navigation.

== Sources ==
- US National Archives
- Records of the Bureau of Marine Inspection and Navigation
- Records of the U.S. Navy Bureau of Navigation
