= Keuffel and Esser =

American instrument manufacturing company (1867–1987)

Keuffel and Esser Co.
- Company type: Corporation
- Industry: Stationery and mathematical instruments
- Founded: 1867
- Headquarters: Hoboken, New Jersey, US
- Key people: Wilhelm J. D. Keuffel, Hermann Esser
- Products: Slide rules, surveying instruments, drawing materials
- Subsidiaries: Young & Sons, purchased 1918

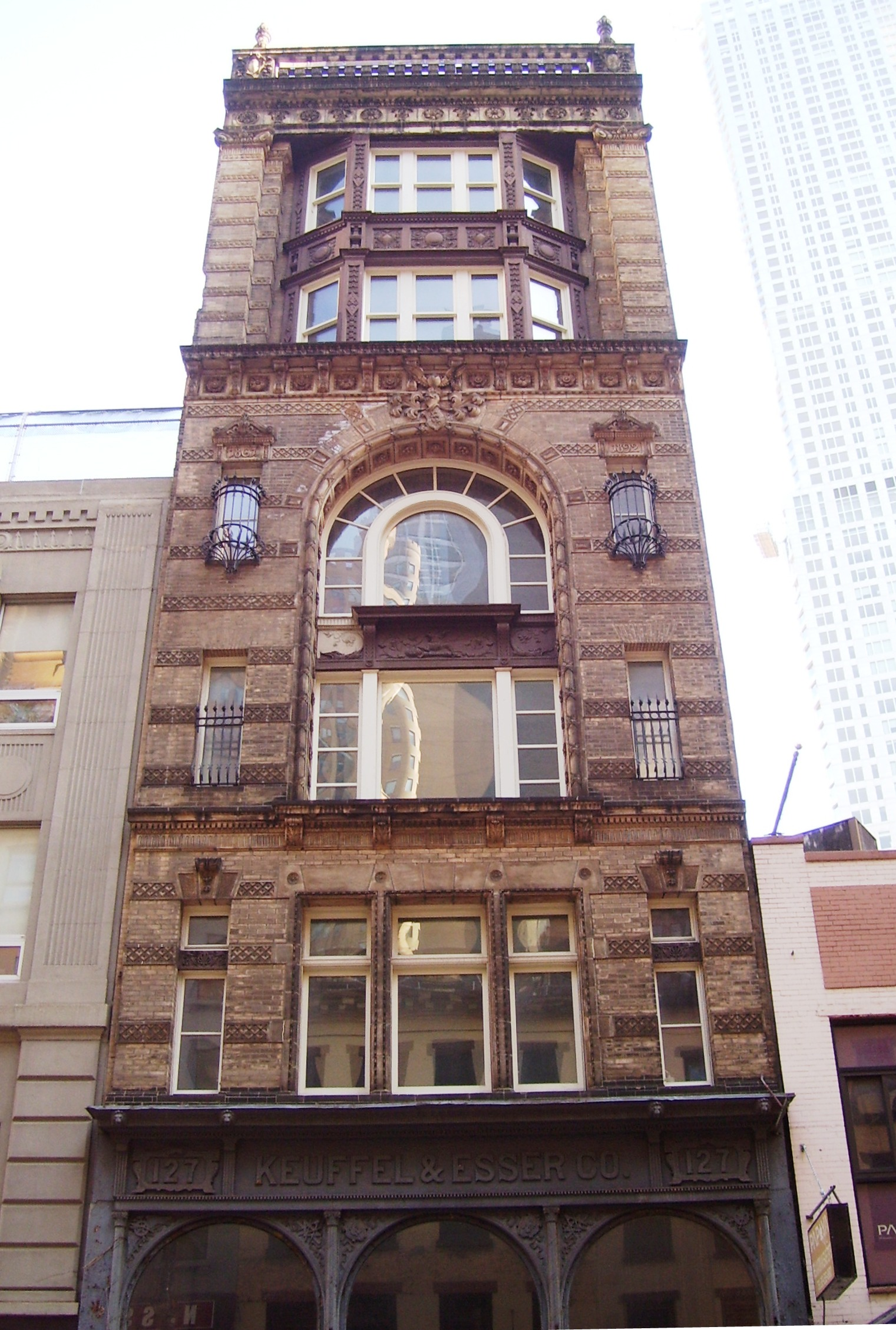
The company's showroom and office building at 127 Fulton Street in the Financial District of Manhattan

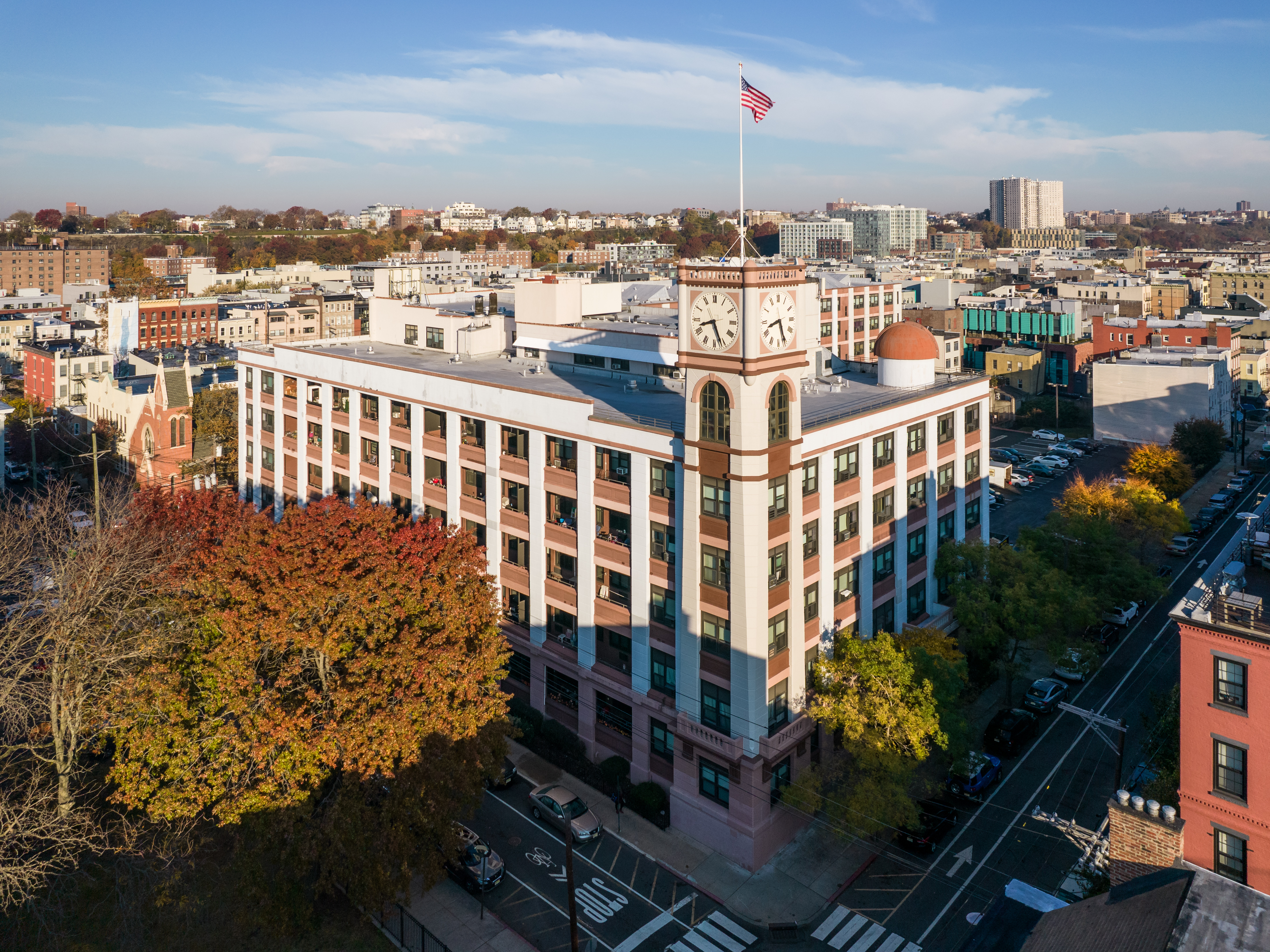
K&E manufacturing complex in Hoboken, New Jersey

The Keuffel and Esser Co., also known as K&E, was an American drafting instrument and supplies company founded in 1867 by German immigrants Wilhelm J. D. Keuffel and Hermann Esser. It was the first U.S. company to specialize in these products.

Keuffel and Esser was acquired by AZON Corp. in 1987.

== History ==
Keuffel and Esser started in New York, selling drawing materials and drafting supplies. In 1876, K&E started selling surveying instruments. The four-story Keuffel and Esser Manufacturing Complex in Hoboken, New Jersey, was completed four years later. K&E was incorporated in 1889.

From 1889 until World War II, K&E employed "Spider Lady" Mary Pfeiffer to manage a "spider ranch" for the firm. It produced strands of spider web used in making crosshairs for telescopic sights.

In 1892, the company commissioned the architecture firm of De Lomos & Cordes to build a showroom and offices at 127 Fulton Street in Manhattan. The firm designed an eight-story brick and terracotta building in the Renaissance Revival style. The building was completed in 1893, and the company occupied it until 1961. It was designated a New York City landmark in 2005.

In the first decade of the 20th century, Keuffel and Esser introduced a new line of surveying instruments based on the work of John Paoli, an Italian immigrant in Hoboken. A new Keuffel and Esser Manufacturing Complex was built in 1906, after the previous building was destroyed by fire. The building was converted to housing in 1975 and was added to the National Register of Historic Places on September 12, 1985.

K&E acquired instrument maker Young & Sons of Philadelphia in 1918 and made it a department of the firm, retaining the brand name for a time.

The Leroy K&E Controlled Lettering System uses a pantograph for mechanical technical lettering.

In the 1960s, K&E had an office in Montreal, Quebec, at 130 Montée de Liesse. It was one of the main suppliers to major engineering firms in Québec during the thriving years of the late sixties, when the province was booming with construction activities, building highways and preparing for Expo 67.

In 1984, Rowley-Scher Reprographics, Inc., a company then based in Washington D.C., acquired K&E's reprographics businesses in Arlington, Fairfax, and Norfolk, all located in Virginia. Keuffel and Esser was acquired by AZON Corporation in 1987.

== Products ==
Perhaps most widely known for its high-quality slide rules, K&E made or sold a wide range of drafting, measuring, and calculating products. Among them were drafting kits and supplies, transits, planimeters, pocket and desk calculators, and fraction adders. By 1930 the K&E catalogue contained over 5,000 items. In 1959 a division was formed to specialize in the development and manufacture of optical, mechanical, and electronic systems for precision measurement of lengths and angles. At the time of the company's centennial in 1967 offered 10,000 different products.

Keuffel & Esser products

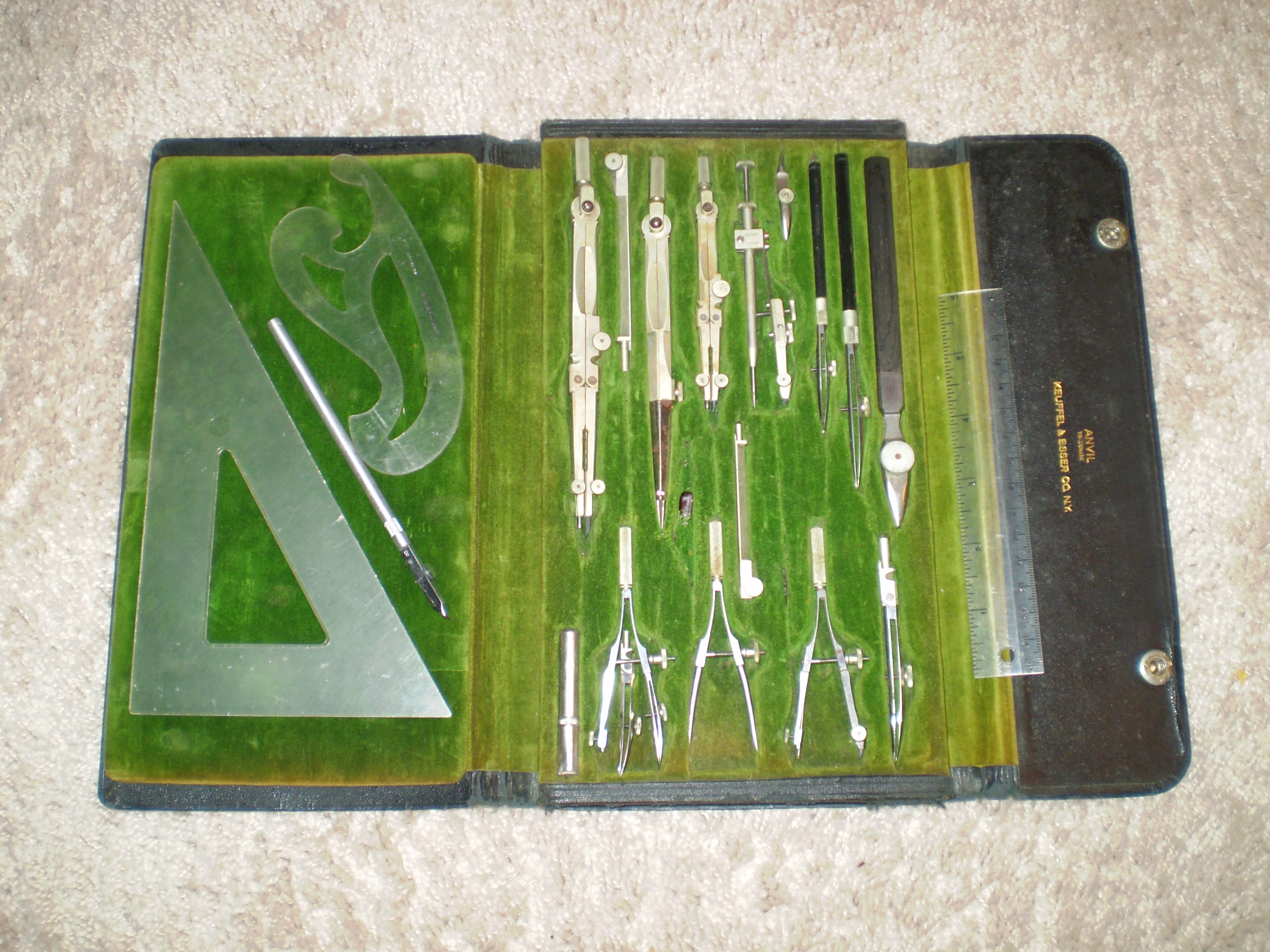
Drafting kit (date unknown)

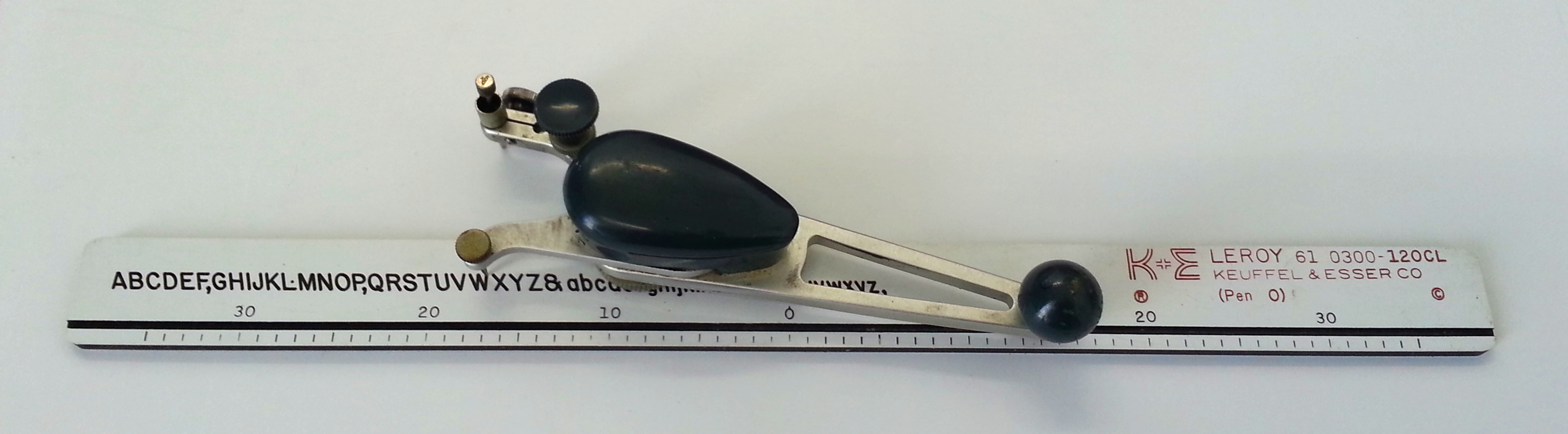
Mechanical lettering set (1959)

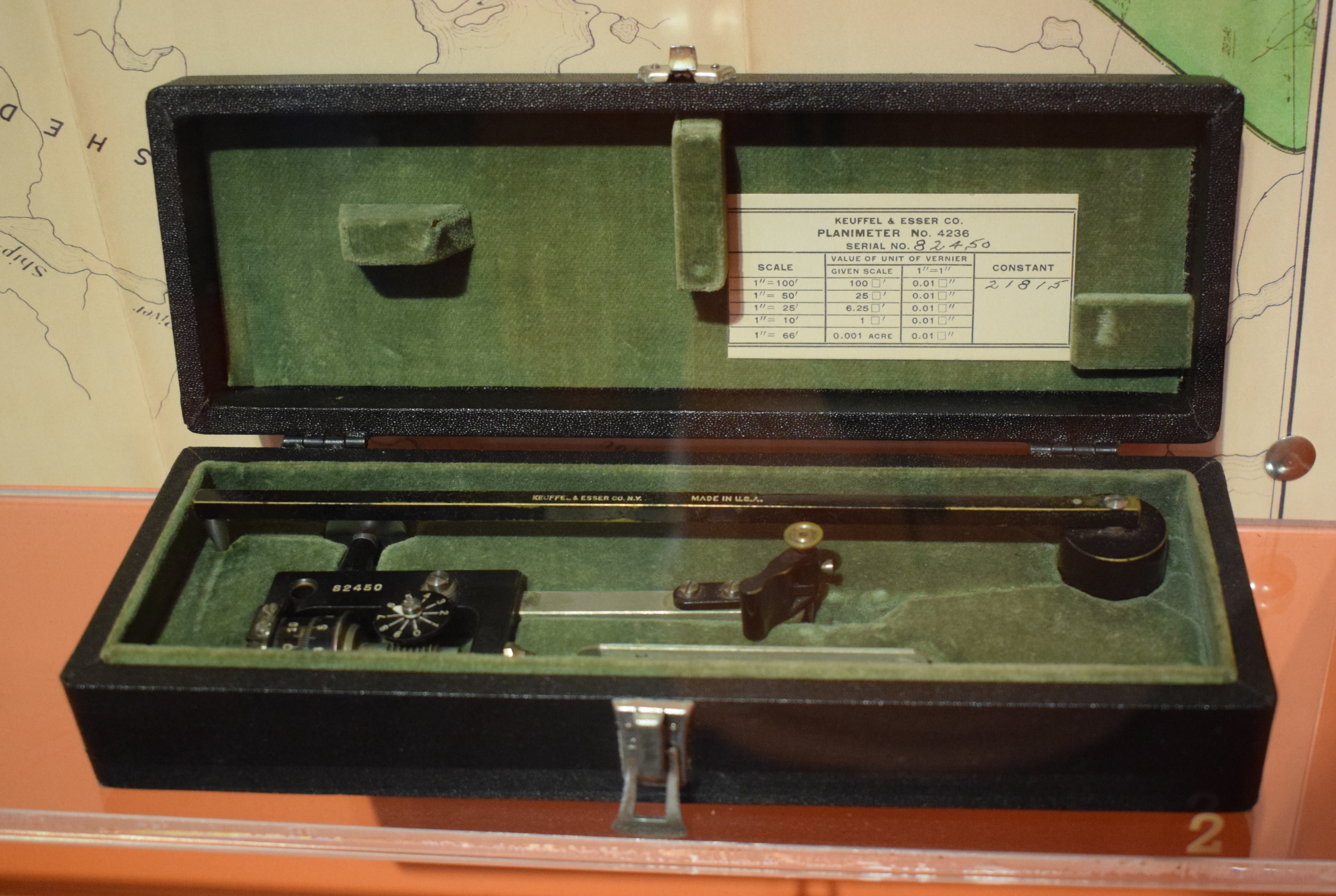
Planimeter (1940s)

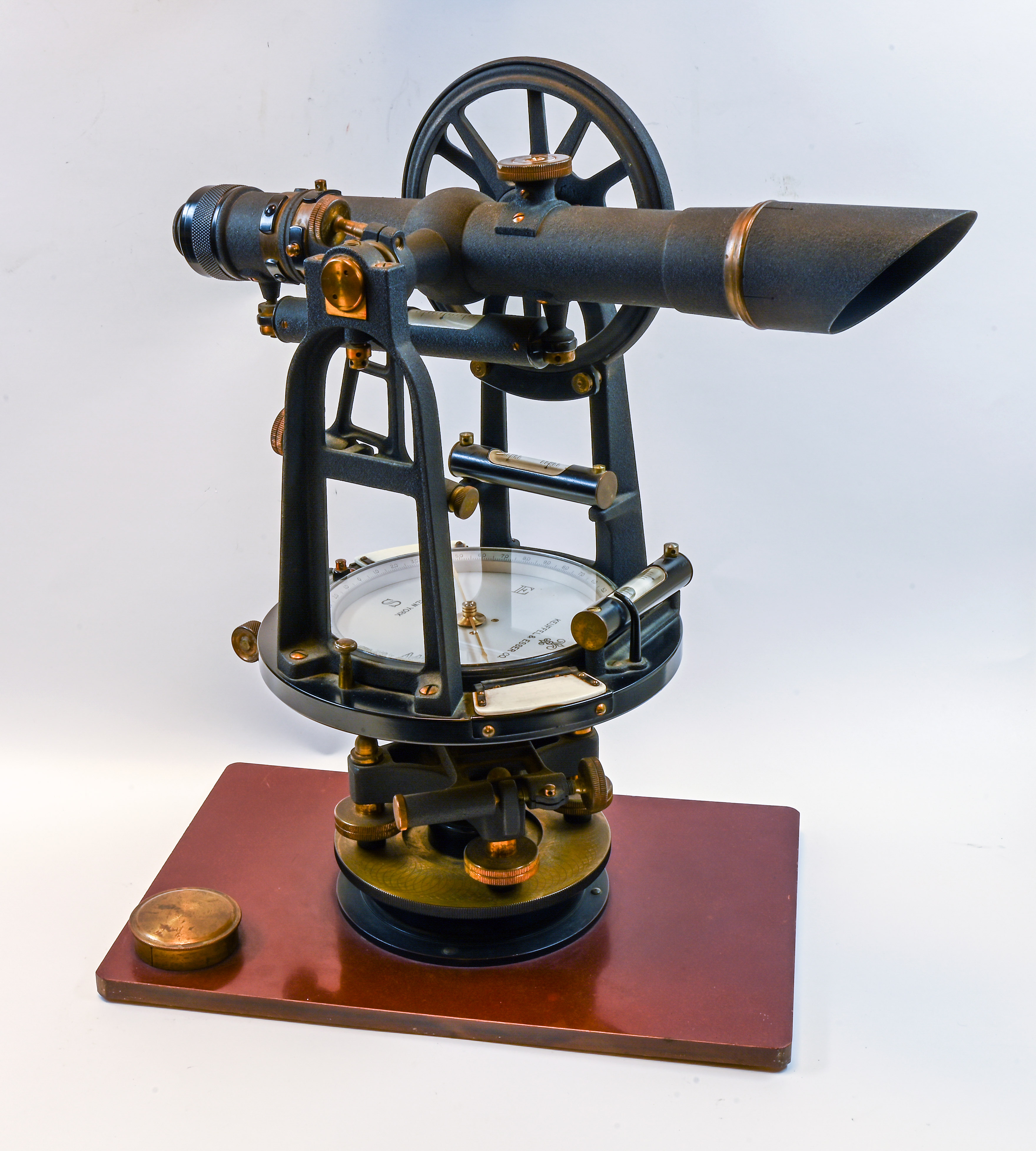
Transit (1940s)

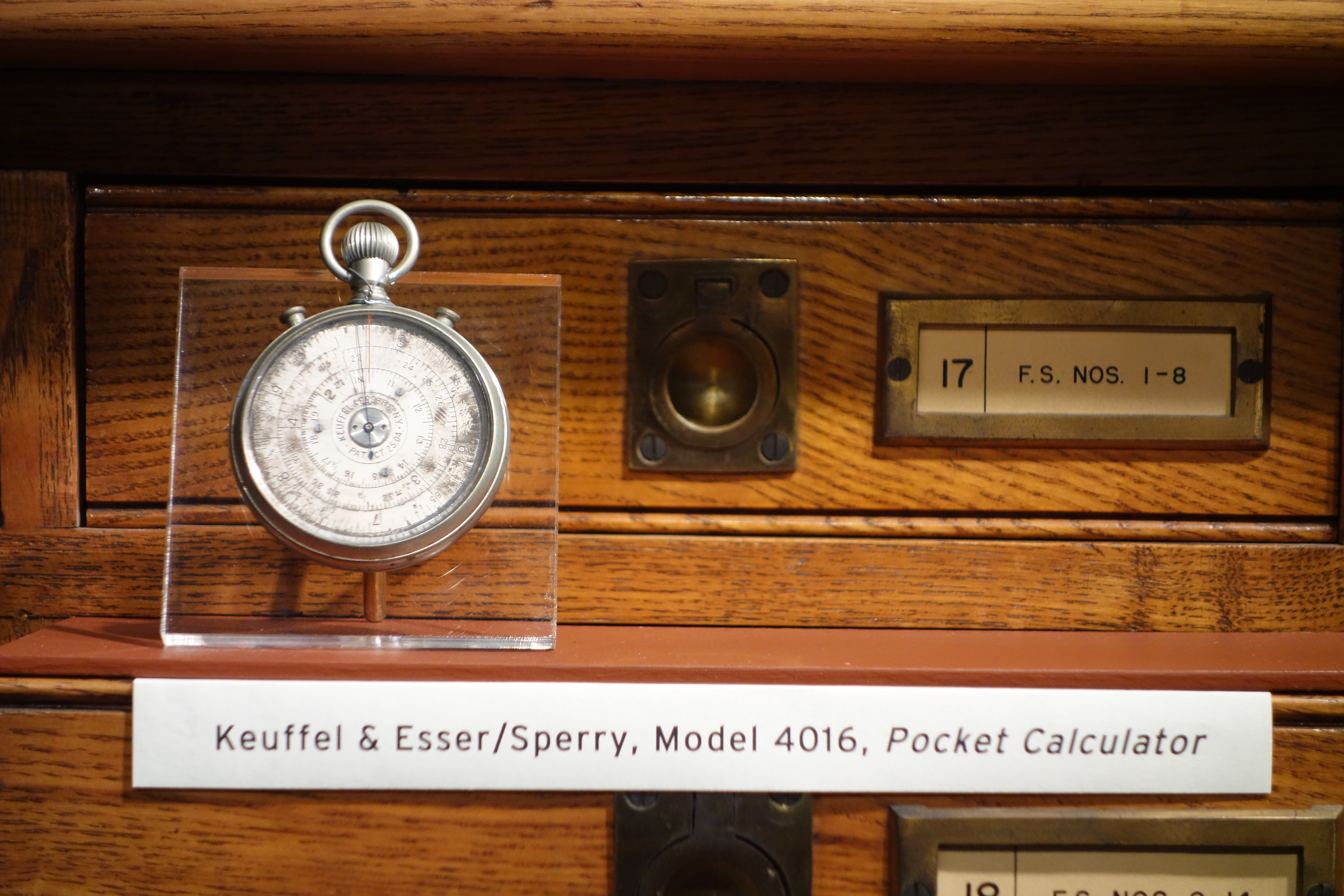
Pocket calculator

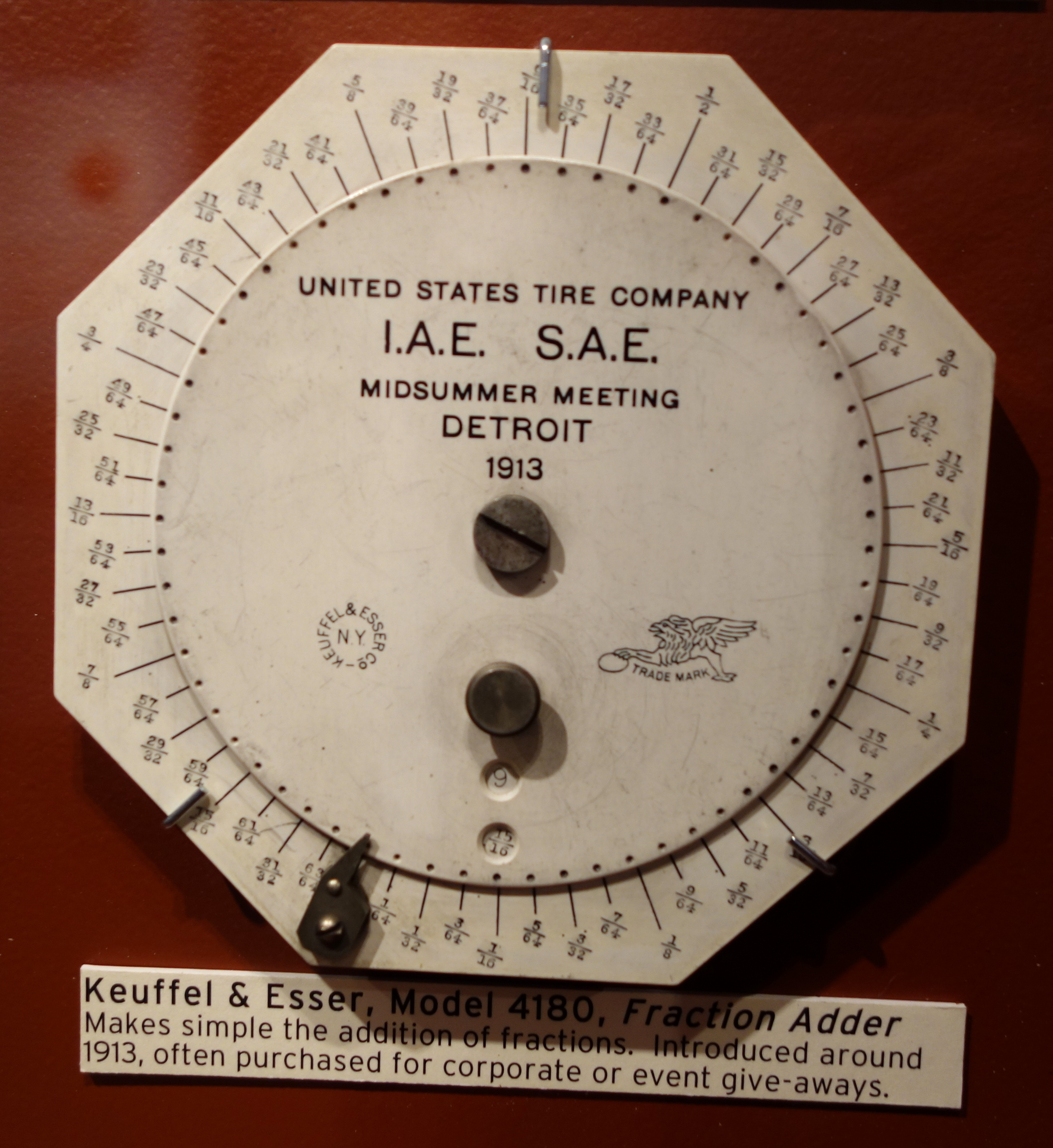
Fraction adder (1913)

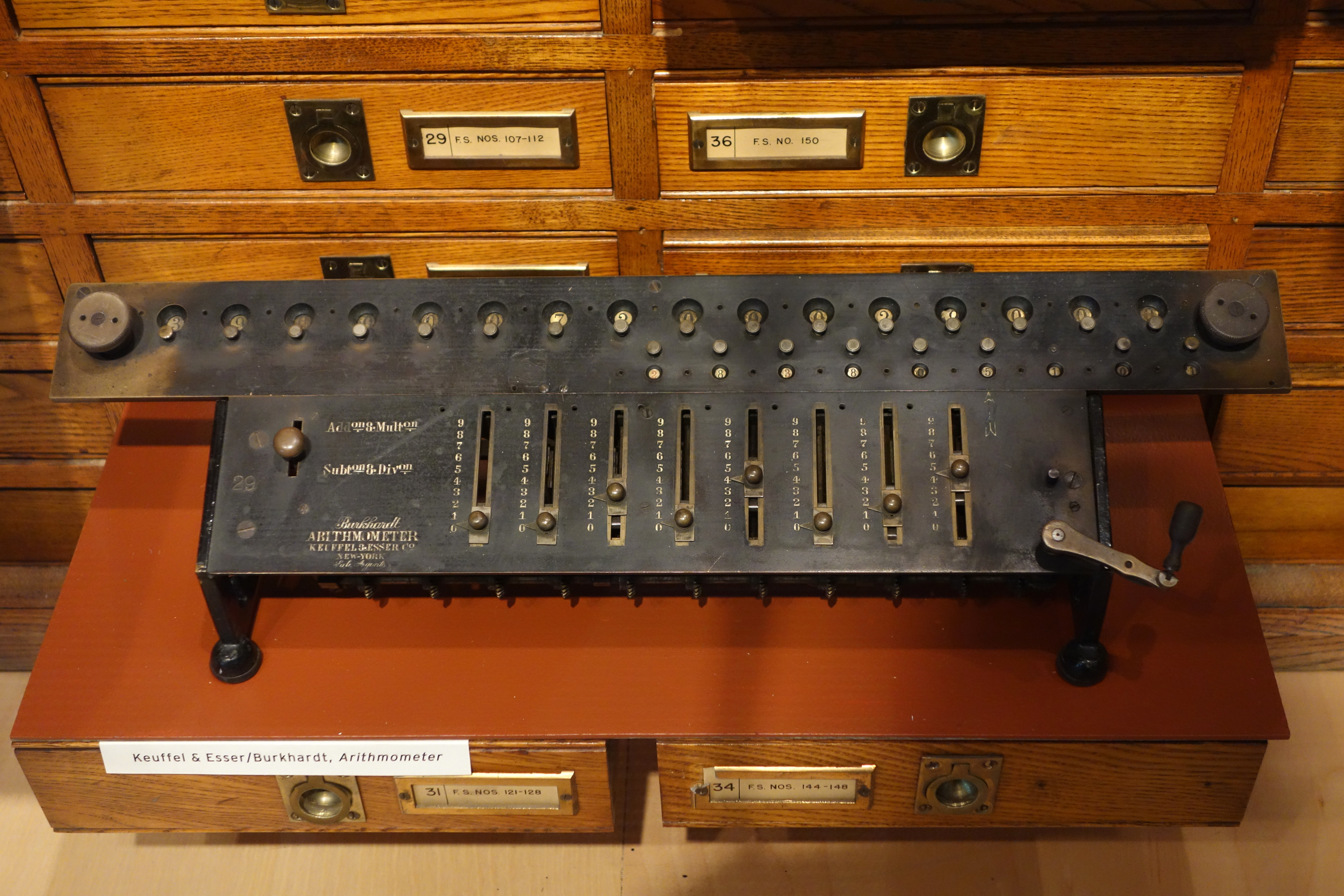
"Arithmometer" desk calculator

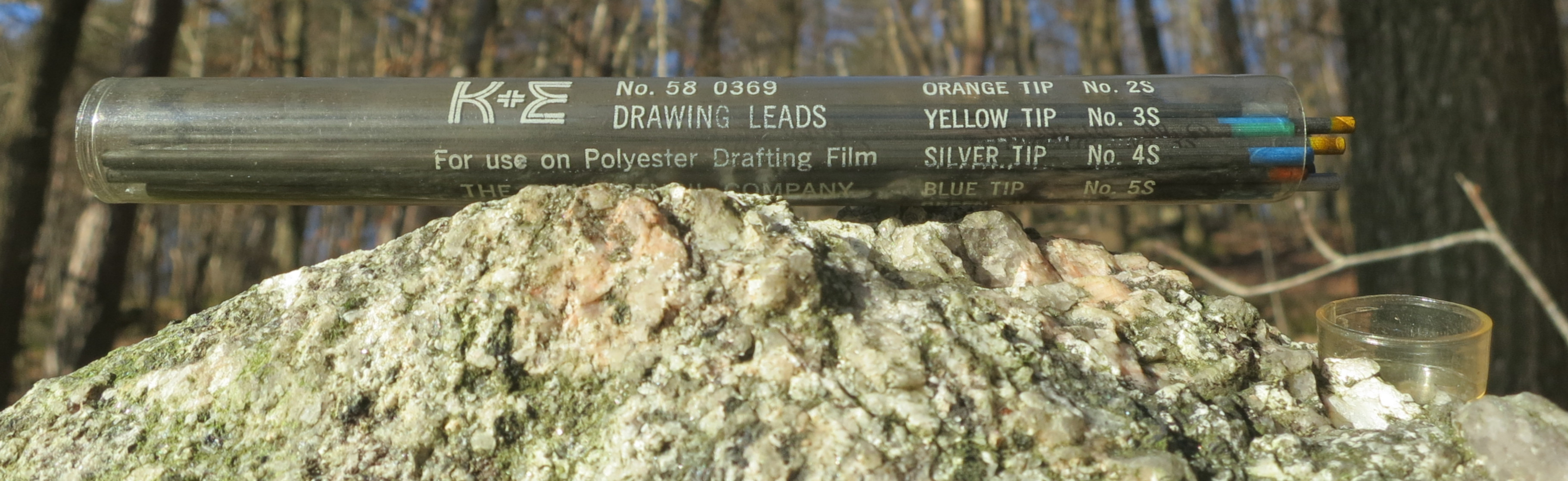
Drawing leads (ca 1980)

=== Slide rules ===
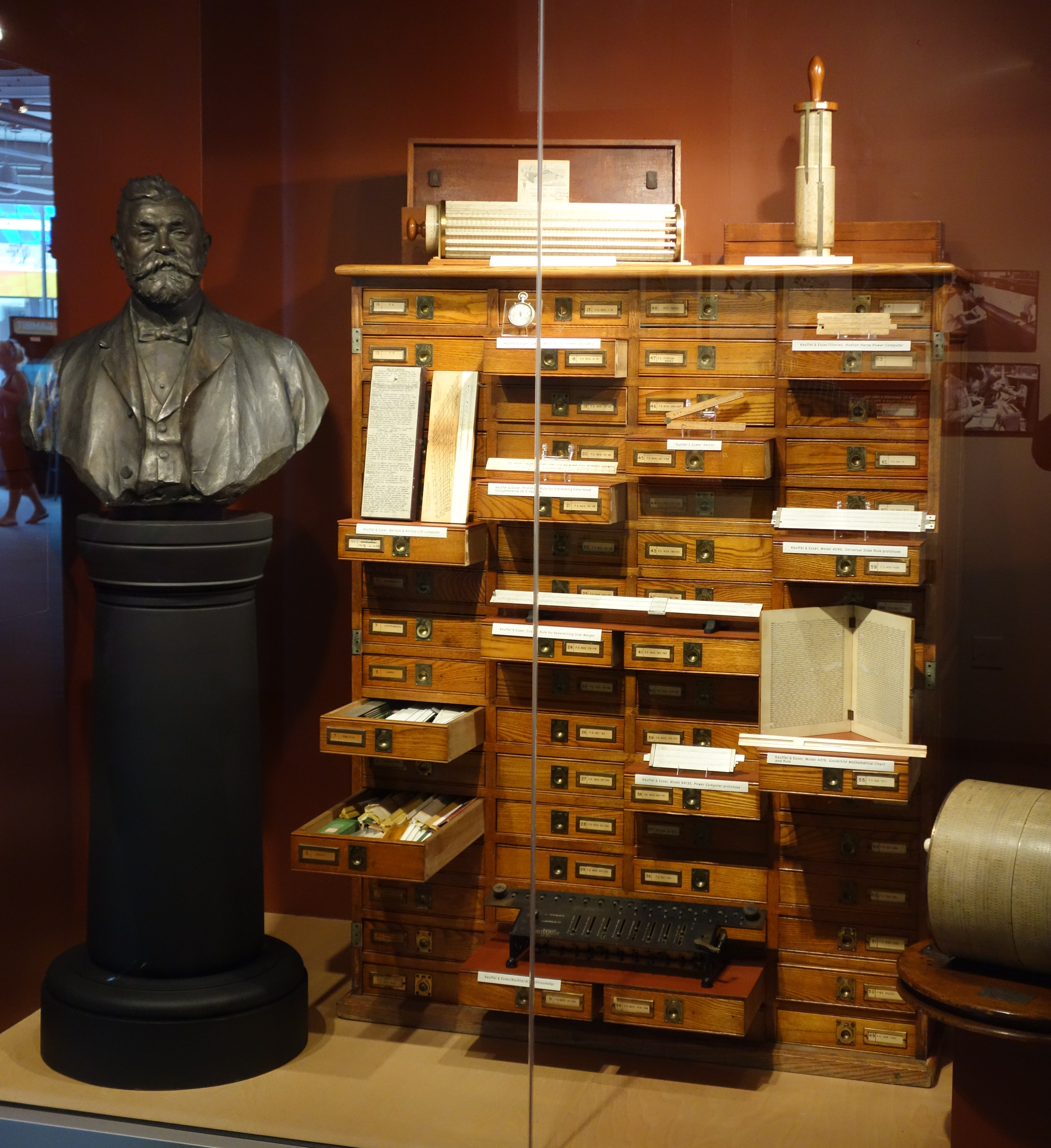
MIT Museum slide rule exhibit (2013)

In 1891, K&E started manufacturing slide rules. Over time it produced a range of instruments, in size, quality, price, and function, with specialized models developed for such tasks as designing municipal sewers, making cement-related calculations, medical functions, commerce, in extra length for enhanced accuracy and in braille for the blind.

The company produced the 4139 Cooke Radio Slide Rule, designed in the mid-1930s by Nelson M. Cooke, of the Navy's Radio Materiel School, thousands of which were made. The K&E 4081-3 Log-Log Duplex Decitrig was a mainstay for engineering students and practicing engineers in the 1940s, 50s, and 60s. During World War II, the company made fire-control instruments for the US government and won seven Army-Navy "E" Awards for Excellence in Production.

With the advent of the pocketable electronic calculator in the 1970s, slide rules became obsolete for most uses. Slide rules had never been very profitable for K&E, so it was not difficult to discontinue the line. K&E's market share shrank because of other technological advancements, and the firm shut down its slide-rule engraving machines in 1975.

Over the years, K&E had amassed a collection of hundreds of slide rules, nomograms, and mechanical calculators, of its own make and others. Around 2005, this collection (which had been acquired by successor companies) was donated to the MIT Museum (Cambridge, Massachusetts), greatly expanding their existing holdings. Selected items from the archives are usually on display at the museum.

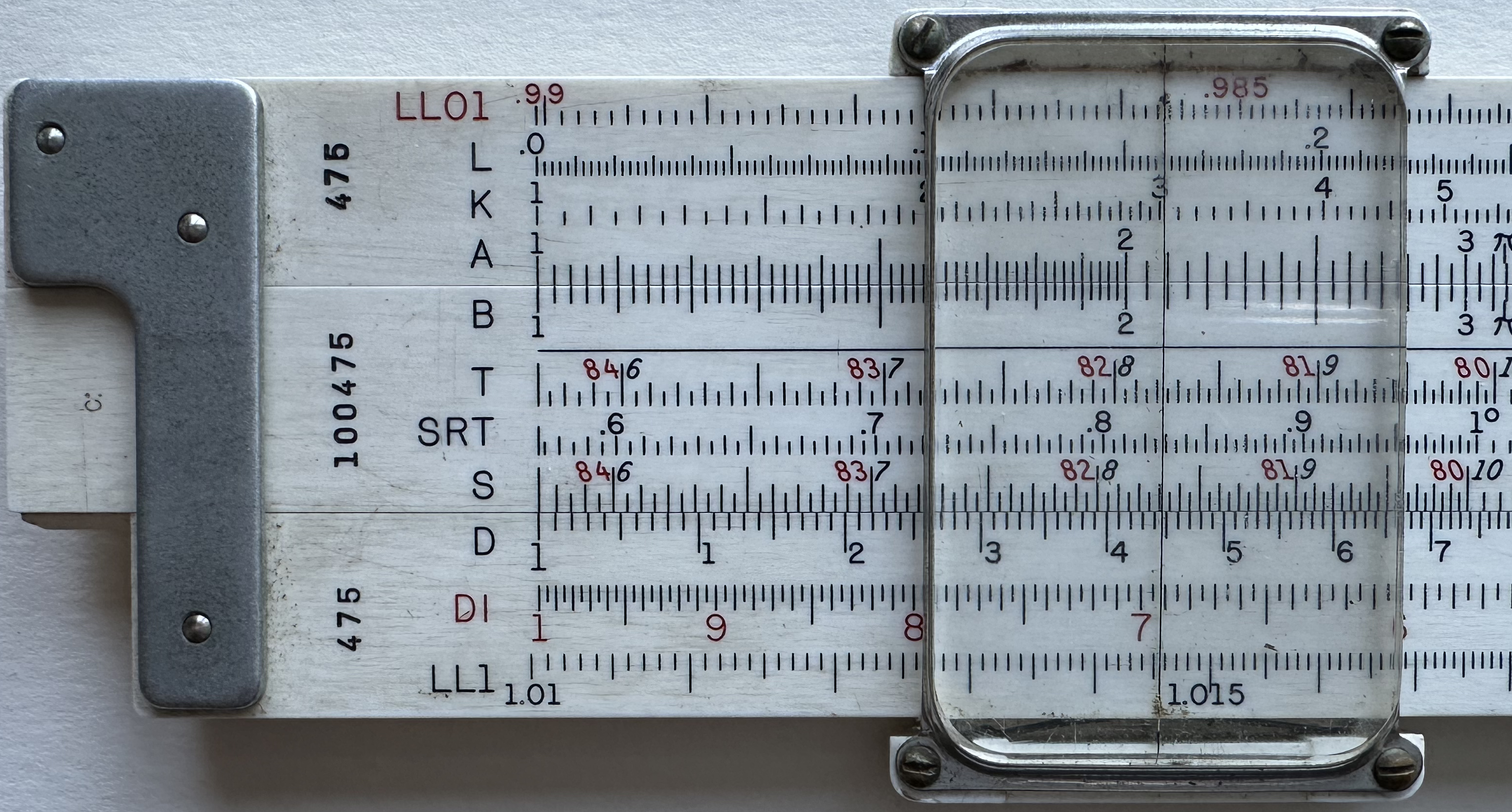
K&E 4181-3 slide rule, front scales

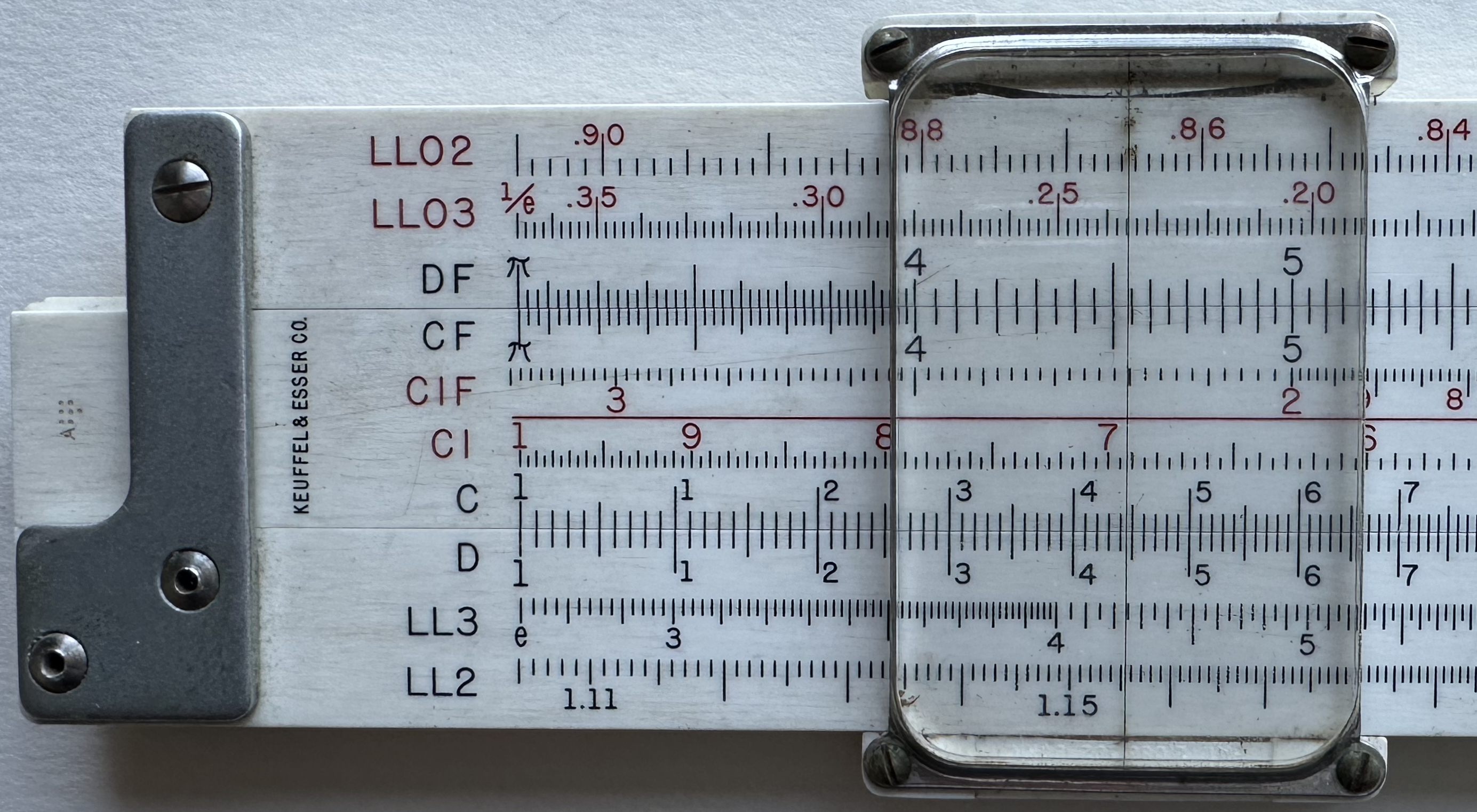
K&E 4181-3 slide rule, rear scales

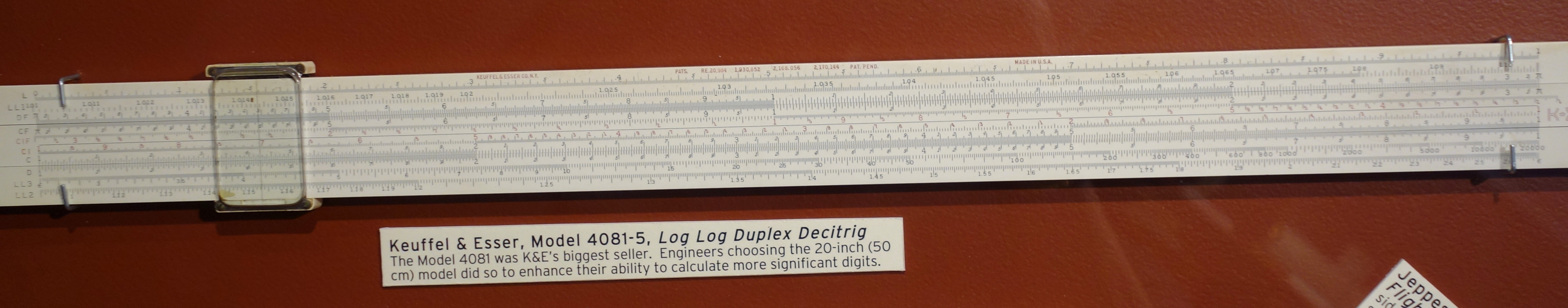
High-precision extra-length engineering slide rule 4081-5

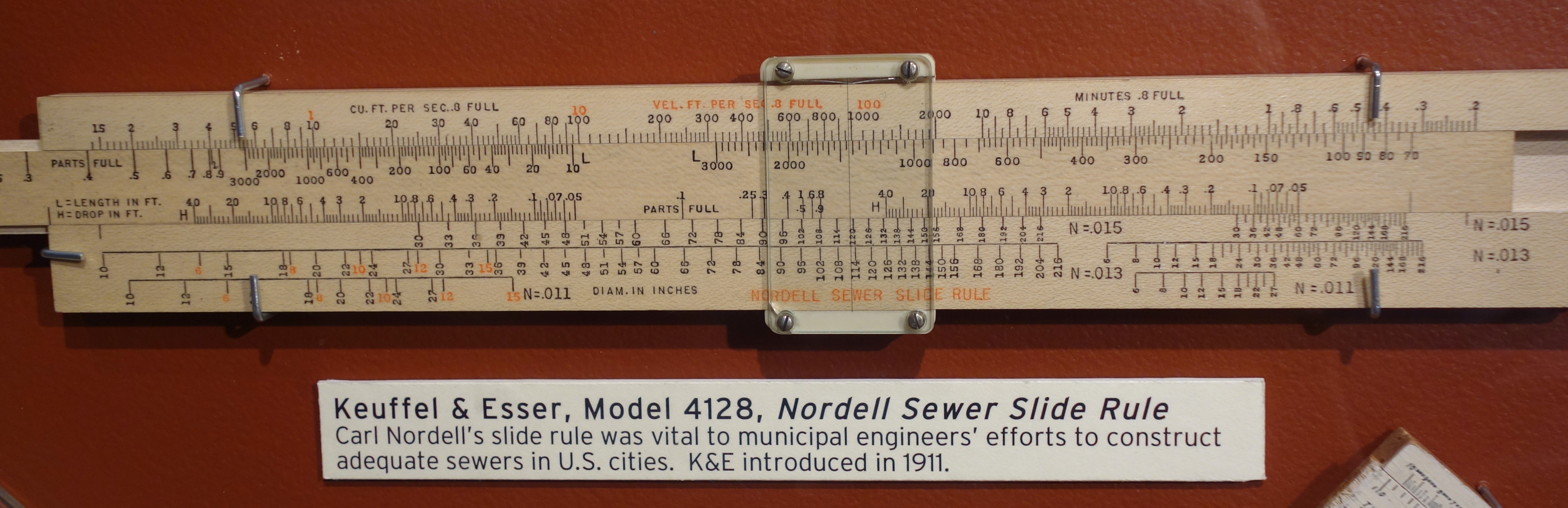
Sewer slide rule

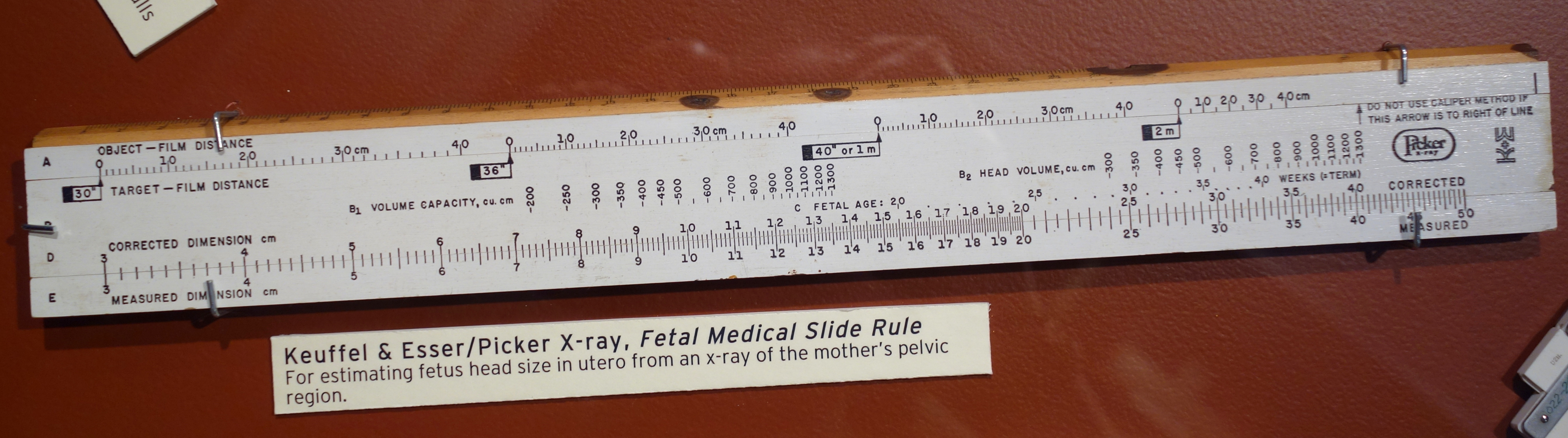
Fetal medical slide rule

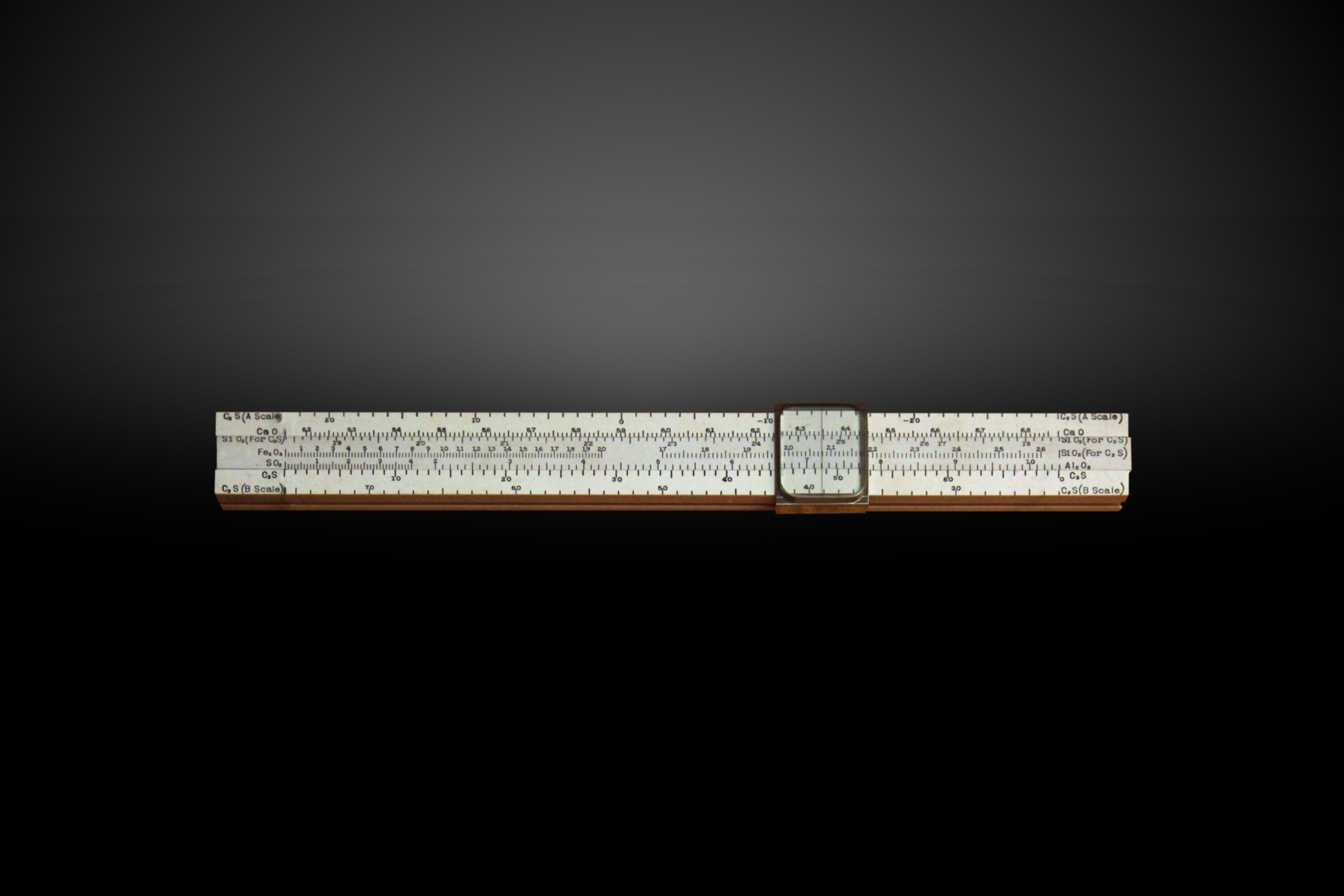
Portland cement slide rule

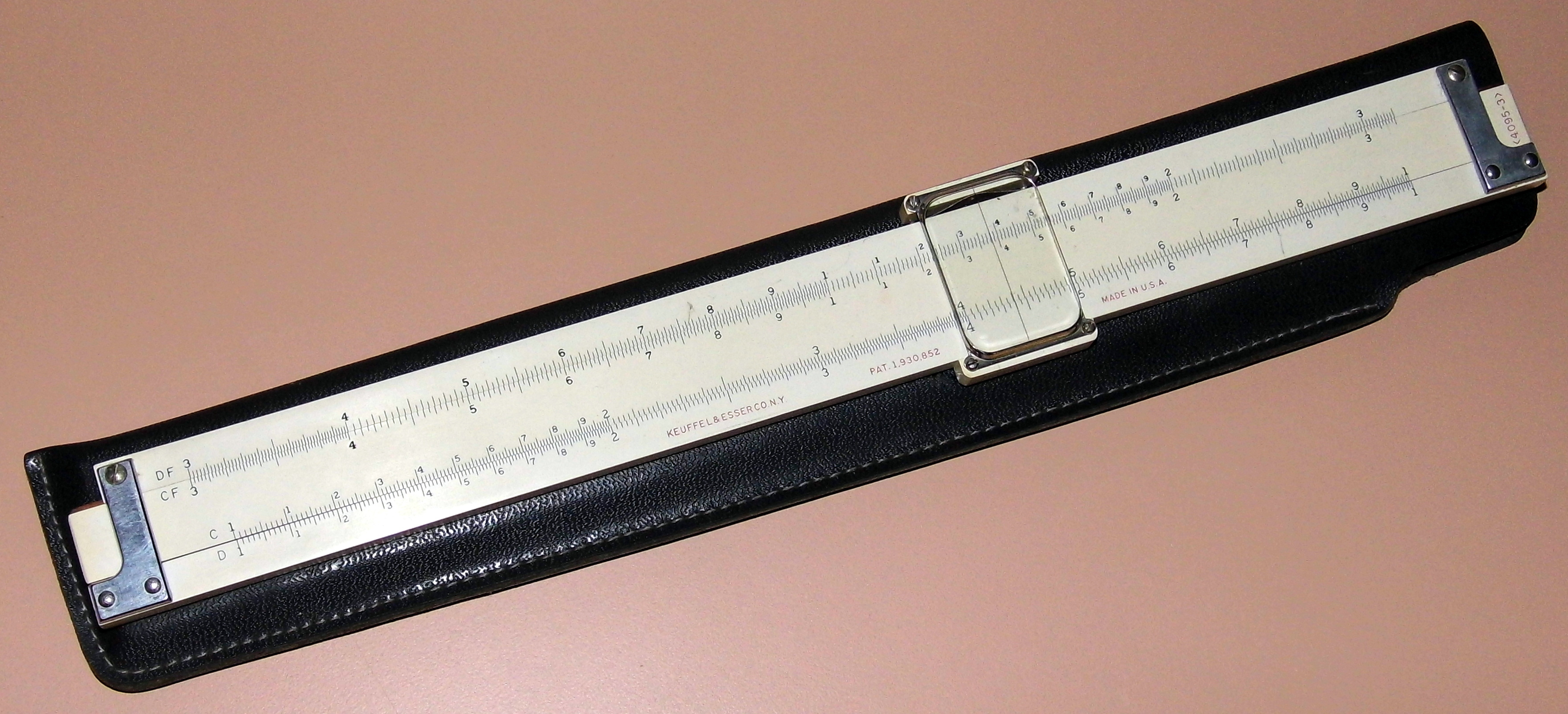
Simplified merchant's slide rule

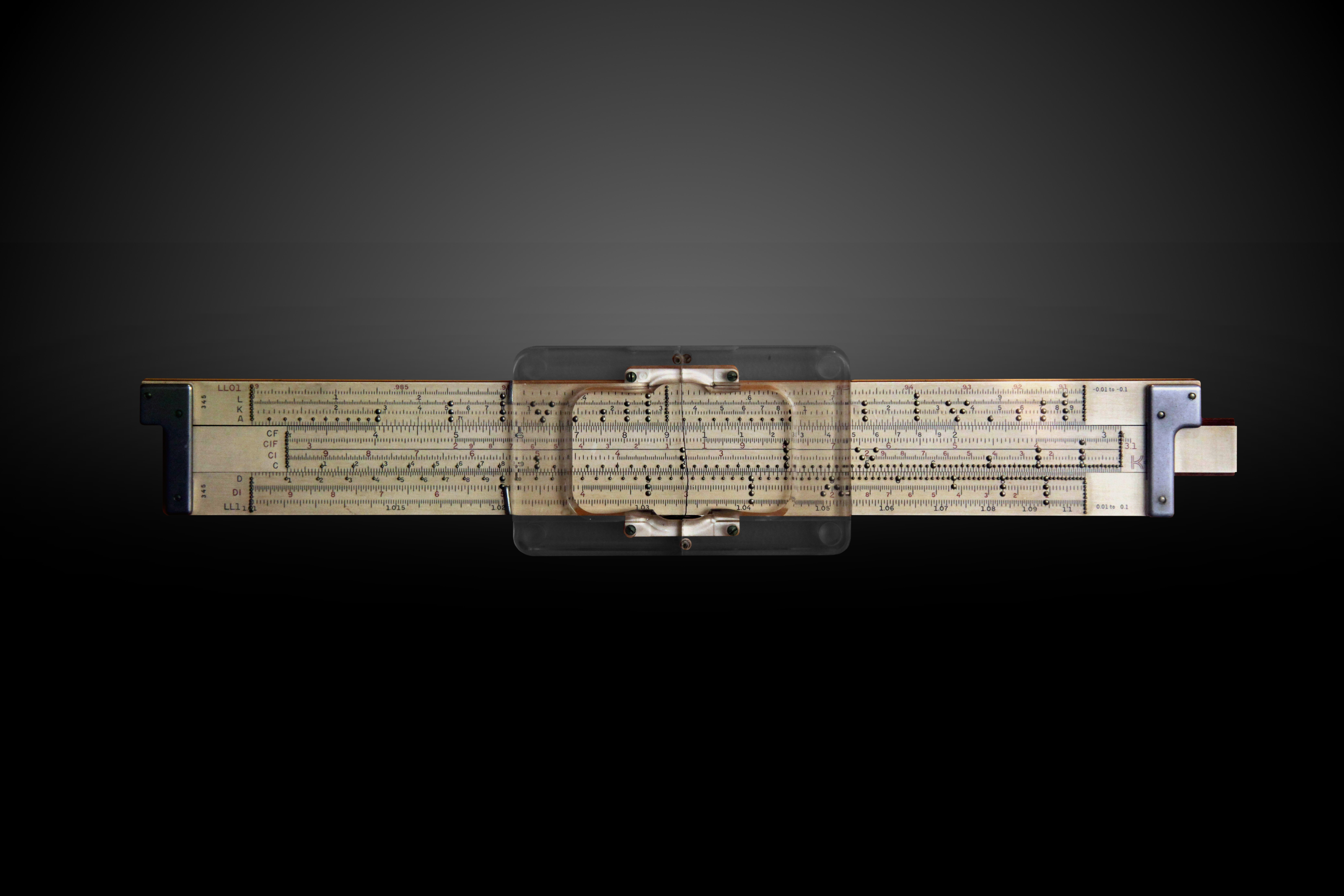
Braille slide rule 4081-3
