= Young & Sons =

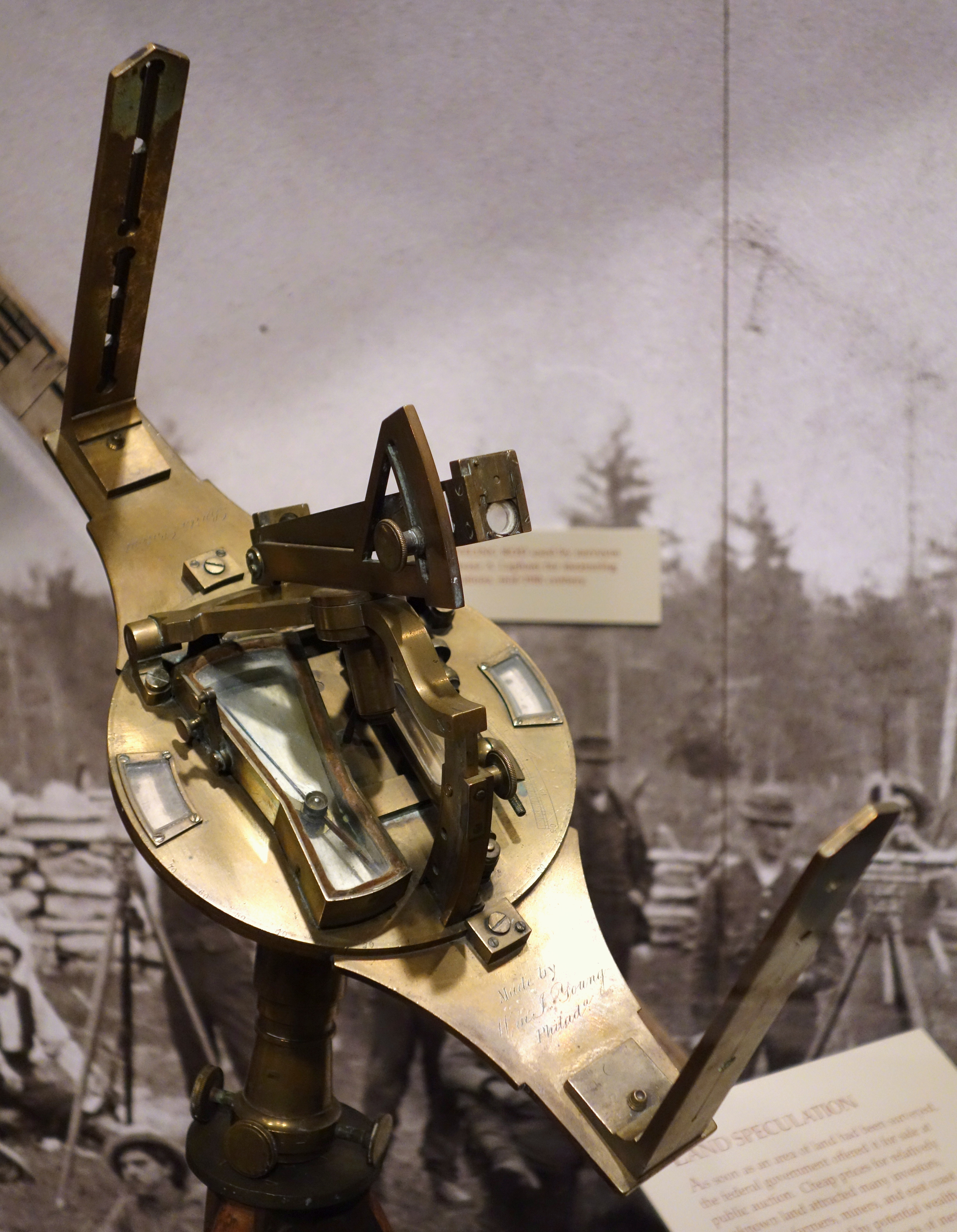
Burt solar compass made by Wm. J. Young, Philadelphia, used in Wisconsin surveys 1840–1850

William James Young (1800 – July 4,1870), probably born in Philadelphia, was indentured as an apprentice to instrument maker Thomas Whitney of Philadelphia for seven years beginning on January 30, 1813. By the 1840s, he was Philadelphia's leading creator of mathematical instruments.

Young opened his first shop at 130 South Front Street in Philadelphia in 1825. Young was first listed in the 1825 Philadelphia directory as a mathematical instrument maker. He exhibited his surveying Y-level and vernier surveying compass in 1827 at the Franklin Institute Fair and these instruments were awarded an honorable mention by the judges.

Young was the first to build a meridian circle that had its mechanical parts constructed by a craftsperson in the United States. He built these circles for several observatories including those at Haverford College and Vassar College. Young made the patent model for inventor William Austin Burt's solar compass.

He continued in business by himself until 1867 when Thomas N. Watson and Charles S. Heller joined him and the firm became known as William J. Young & Co. Young's son Alfred later took over the company and it became known as Young & Sons. It produced surveying and other precision devices until Keuffel and Esser of New York City acquired the company in 1918. Even then, K&E continued to offer a separate line of instruments with the Young & Sons name so as to maintain the customer base that had been built over the years. K&E moved the Young operation to Hoboken, New Jersey, in 1922.
