= Keuffel and Esser Manufacturing Complex =

- U.S. National Register of Historic Places
- New Jersey Register of Historic Places
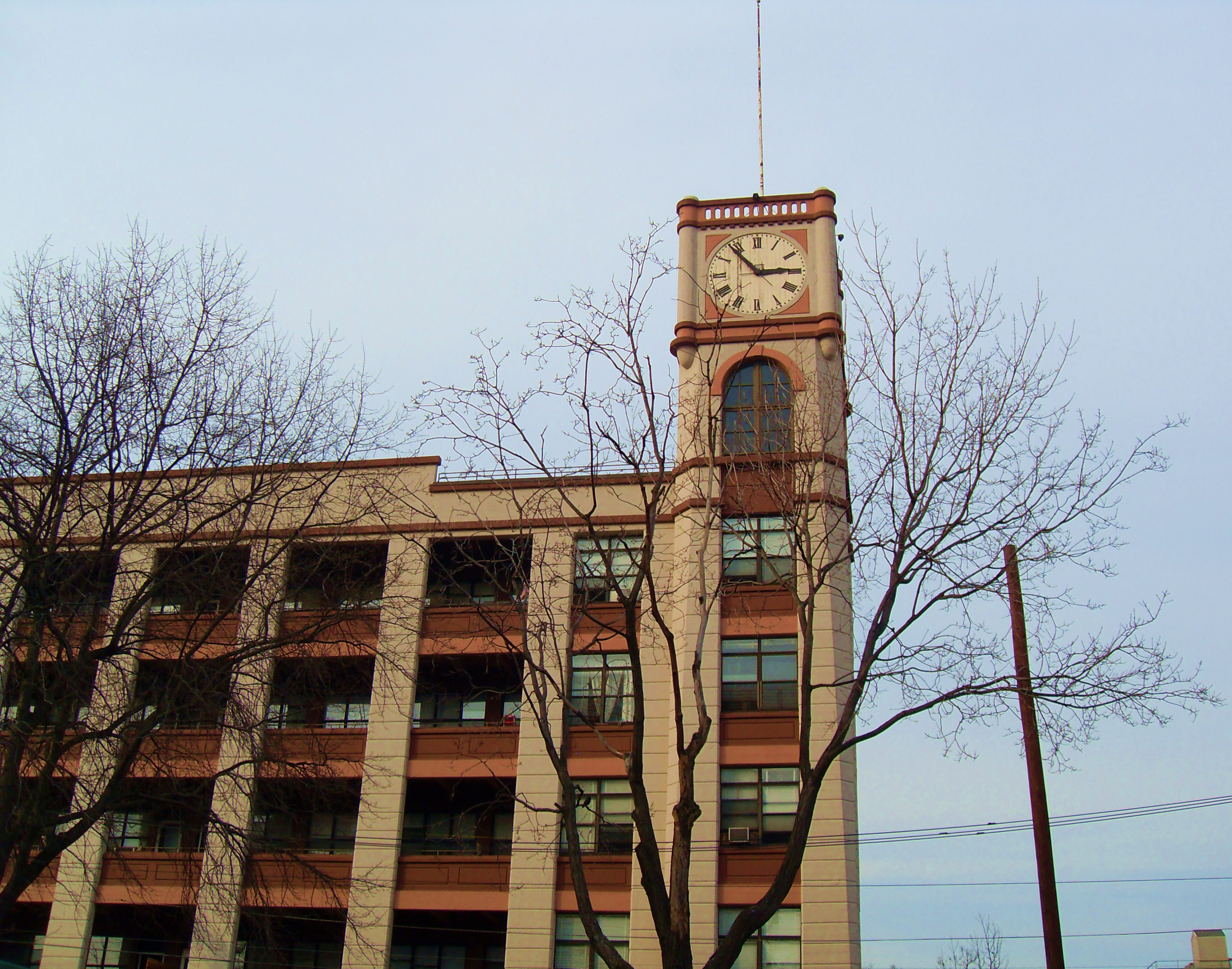

- Location within Hudson County, New Jersey Location within New Jersey Location within the United States
- Location: 3rd, Grand & Adams Street, Hoboken, New Jersey
- Coordinates: 40°44′29″N 74°2′13″W
- Area: 3.1 acres (1.3 ha)
- Built: 1906
- Architect: Lederle & Co.; Multiple
- Architectural style: Renaissance, Italianate
- NRHP reference No.: 85002183
- NJRHP No.: 1472

Significant dates
- Added to NRHP: September 12, 1985
- Designated NJRHP: July 31, 1985

The Keuffel and Esser Manufacturing Complex is located in Hoboken, Hudson County, New Jersey, United States. The western concrete building with the four-sided clock tower was built in 1906 and opened in 1907, after the previous building was destroyed by a fire in 1905. Keuffel and Esser manufactured instruments for the architectural, engineering and drafting professions at the complex from 1907 to 1968.

In 1975 the building was converted to housing. The western half of the complex became known as Clock Towers, while the eastern half of the complex (which was built in 1887) was converted into residential apartments in 1984 and became what is now called the Grand Adams Apartments. The complex was added to the National Register of Historic Places on September 12, 1985, for its significance in architecture.

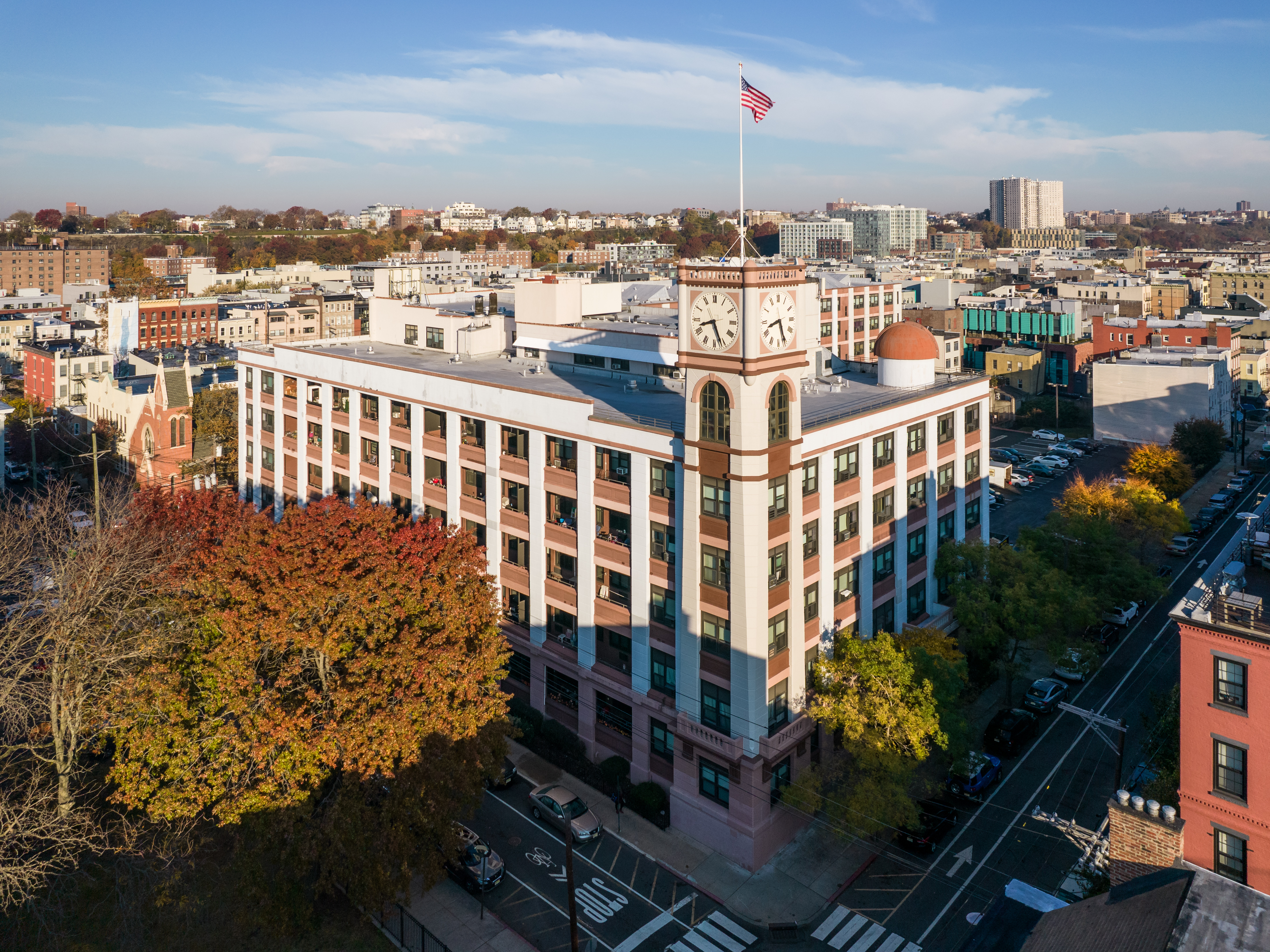
Aerial view of complex

== See also ==
- National Register of Historic Places listings in Hudson County, New Jersey
