= Technical lettering =

Standardized style of writing in technical drawing

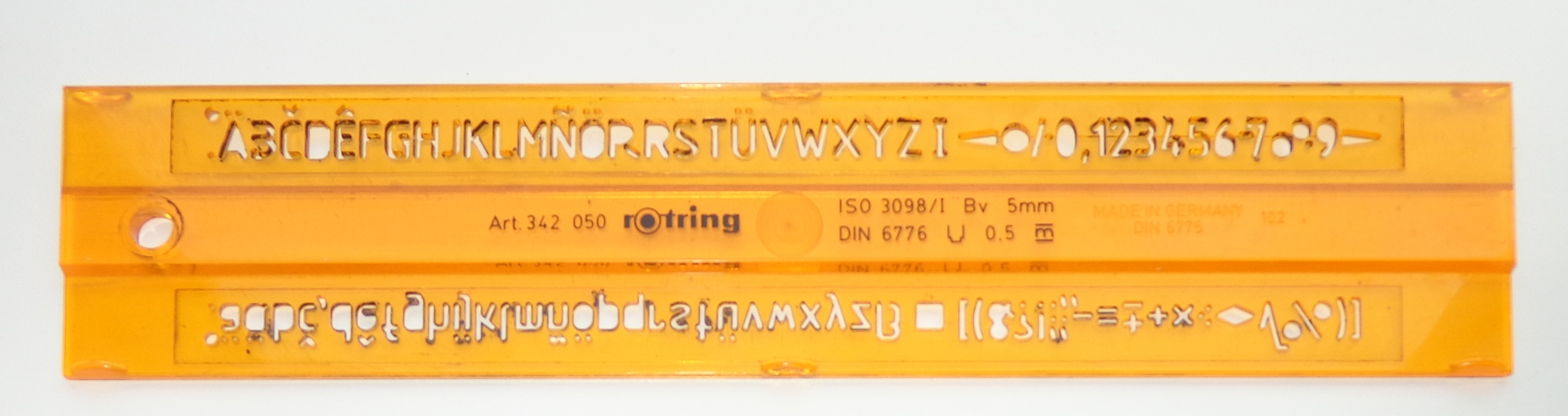
A technical lettering stencil

Technical lettering is the process of forming letters, numerals, and other characters in technical drawing. It is used to describe, or provide detailed specifications for, an object. With the goals of legibility and uniformity, styles are standardized and lettering ability has little relationship to normal writing ability. Engineering drawings use a Gothic sans-serif script, formed by a series of short strokes. Lower case letters are rare in most drawings of machines.

== Methods of forming letters ==
Freehand lettering is done without the assistance of tools. To regulate lettering height, commonly 3 mm (1/8-in), guidelines are drawn.

Mechanical lettering is done using tools such as lettering guides, templates, or using a small mechanical pantograph referred to by the Keuffel and Esser trademark "Leroy".

Modern drawings are lettered with computer-aided design software.

== Freehand lettering ==
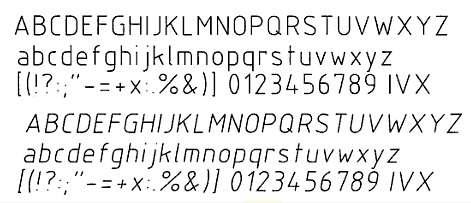
Technical Lettering. Similar to ISOCP font, available in AutoCAD.

The letters to be drawn, though freehanded, should be stable and graceful. In some cases stability is impossible; for example, P and F are unavoidably top-heavy. In other cases the stability and grace of the letters may be maintained either by drawing the lower parts of the letters like B,E etc. wider than the upper parts, or by drawing the horizontal line at the center of these letters just above their geometric axis. (Exception: In case of the letter A, the horizontal member is drawn below the geometric center, to maintain equality of areas below and above the center line. If a horizontal line is drawn exactly at the center, then the difference in the areas of the triangle above the line and the trapezium below the line is much larger. This creates an unusual effect to our eyes.)

Emphasis should be on the overall beauty of a word, rather than individual letters.

Most freehand lettering is done in a "gothic" style, i.e., with a constant line thickness; either "straight gothic", with vertical strokes perpendicular to the baseline, or "inclined gothic", with vertical strokes at about 75°.

== Mechanical lettering ==
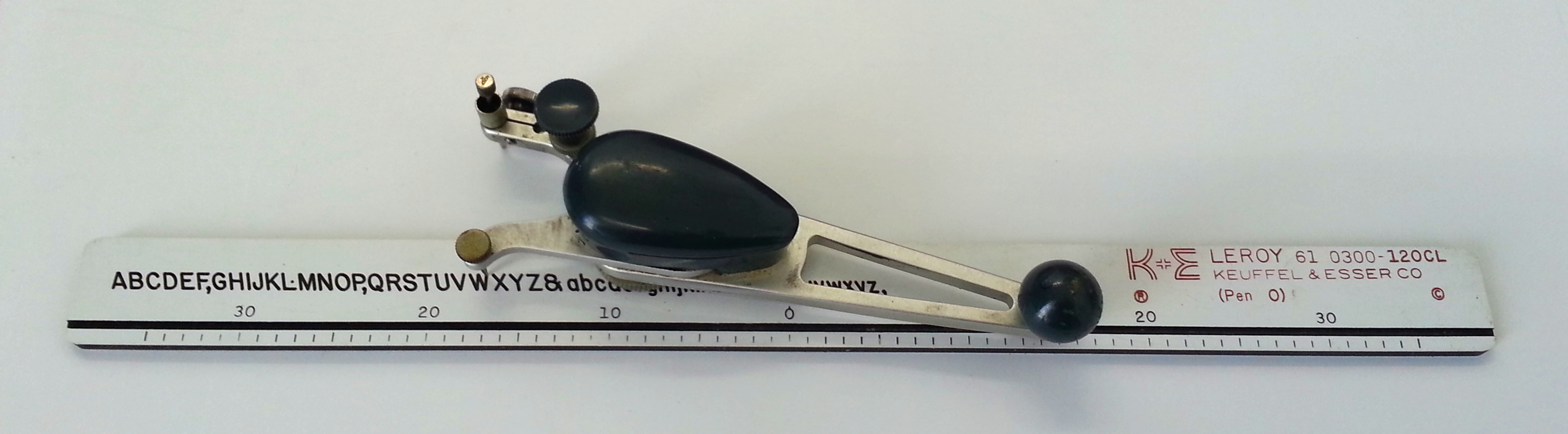
K & E Leroy lettering set (1959)

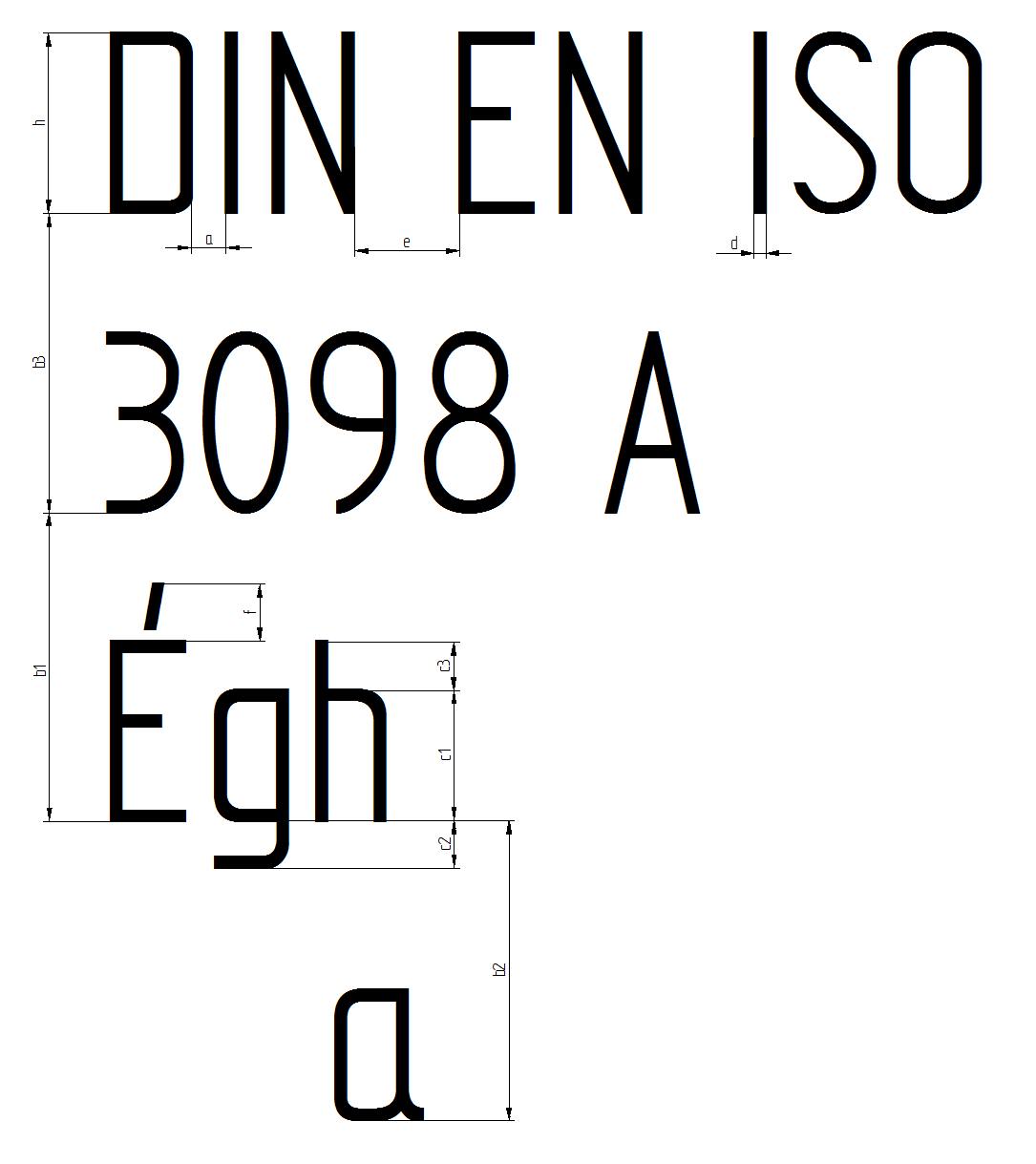
Standard font according to DIN EN ISO 3098-0

Mechanical lettering is sometimes done using a pantograph, a device consisting of four bars ("links") which are pinned to each other to form a parallelogram. The links can pivot about these pins. The lowermost link of the parallelogram is fixed to two rigid supports. One vertical link at one end is connected to a profile tracer, which traces the profile of the letter to be drawn, and the second vertical link and the other horizontal link are jointly connected to a pencil that draws the exact shape of the profile traced.

A drafting instrument that was used from the 1940s to the 1970s was a lettering guide. It was invented by the Keuffel and Esser company. This utilized a laminated piece of plastic with the letters engraved as grooves. This was called a mechanical lettering template. A scriber with an ink pen was placed on the template to trace these letters. It produced standard uniform characters on the paper.

The ISO 3098 standard defines lettering for technical product documentation. The original version of the standard was published in 1997; the updated version was published in 2015. The general requirements describe lettering for technical documentation using the following techniques: free-hand, templates and lettering instruments, dry transfer, and numerically controlled. The standard consists of the following parts:

- Part 1: General requirements
- Part 2: Latin alphabet, numerals and marks
- Part 3: Greek alphabet
- Part 4: Diacritical and particular marks for the Latin alphabet
- Part 5: CAD lettering of the Latin alphabet, numerals and marks
- Part 6: Cyrillic alphabet

== Dimensions of letters ==
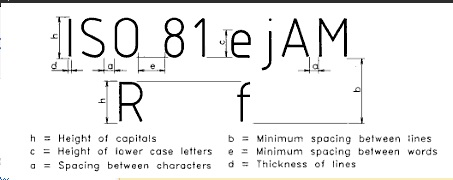
Dimensioning of Letters

- The Nominal Size of lettering is defined by the height (h) of the outline contour of the upper-case (capital).
- Central Line is the imaginary line in the middle of each line or line element which is a constitutive part of a graphic character set.
- If we consider d as the width of the line element and h as the height of the line element, then the two standard ratios for d/h are: 1/14 and 1/10, which are feasible because they result in a minimum number of line thicknesses.
- Location of Central Lines – The nominal size (h) and the spacing between characters (a) shall be taken as the basis for defining the central line.
- Range of Nominal Sizes – The nominal size is typically one of the sequence 2.5 mm, 3.5 mm, 5 mm, 7 mm, 10 mm, 14 mm, 20 mm. Successive members of this sequence are approximately in a ratio of the square root of 2, as in the ISO 216 series of paper sizes.
- Lettering Angle – The lettering may be vertical (upright) or inclined (sloped) to the right at 75° from the horizontal. Compare oblique type.
- The spacing between two characters may be reduced by half, if this gives a better visual effect.
- Various letters are divided into number of parts so that dimensions will be accurate.
- The size of letter is described by its height. According to the height of letters, they are classified as Lettering A or Lettering B.

=== Lettering A ===
Characteristic	Parameter	Ratio	Dimensions (mm)						
Lettering height (height of capitals)	h	(14/14)h	2.50	3.50	5.00	7.0	10.0	14	20.0
Height of lower case letters (without stem or tail)	c	(10/14)h	—	2.50	3.50	5.0	7.0	10	14.0
Spacing between characters	a	(2/14)h	0.35	0.50	0.70	1.0	1.4	2	2.8
Minimum spacing of base characters	b	(20/14)h	3.50	5.00	7.00	10.0	14.0	20	28.0
Minimum spacing between words	e	(6/14)h	1.05	1.50	2.10	3.0	4.2	6	8.4
Thickness of lines	d	(1/14)h	0.18	0.25	0.35	0.5	0.7	1	1.4

=== Lettering B ===
Characteristic	Parameter	Ratio	Dimensions (mm)						
Lettering height (height of capitals)	h	(10/10)h	2.50	3.50	5.0	7.0	10	14.0	20
Height of lower case letters (without stem or tail)	c	(7/10)h	—	2.50	3.5	5.0	7	10.0	14
Spacing between characters	a	(2/10)h	0.50	0.70	1.0	1.4	2	2.8	4
Minimum spacing of base characters	b	(14/10)h	3.50	5.00	7.0	10.0	14	20.0	28
Minimum spacing between words	e	(6/10)h	1.50	2.10	3.0	4.2	6	8.4	12
Thickness of lines	d	(1/10)h	0.25	0.35	0.5	0.7	1	1.4	2

== See also ==
- CAD standards
  - List of International Organization for Standardization standards, 1-4999 § ISO 1000 – ISO 1499
- Lettering guide
