= Lettering guide =

Template for writing text

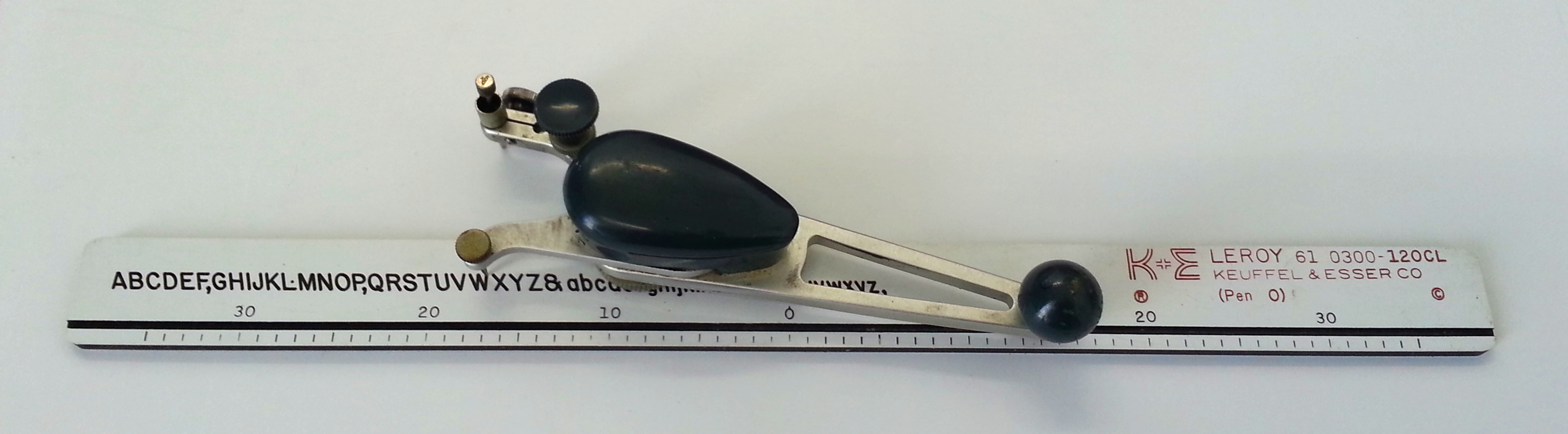
Mechanical lettering set (1959)

A lettering guide template is a special type of template used to write uniform characters. It consists of a sheet of plastic or other material with cut-outs of letters, numbers, and other shapes used especially for creating technical drawings. For decades they were essential for lettering a drawing nameplate so that text and other designs could be made quickly and uniformly.

Although they have been superseded by the use of computers, during the greater part of the last century they were used to ease the lettering process in the creation of technical drawings. They were an indispensable tool for architects and technical illustrators in general, for labeling their drawings and plans but also for the description of projects, in which it was good practice to use a lettering template to achieve uniform and well-written text.

A lettering template could also be used by illiterate or semi-illiterate people to learn to type, or to improve their handwriting. In the course of political history some politicians, such as Bettino Craxi, have used them to help people with writing difficulties. They distributed cardboard templates with the sequence of characters of their last name, so they could be easily written during the voting process.

Lettering guides

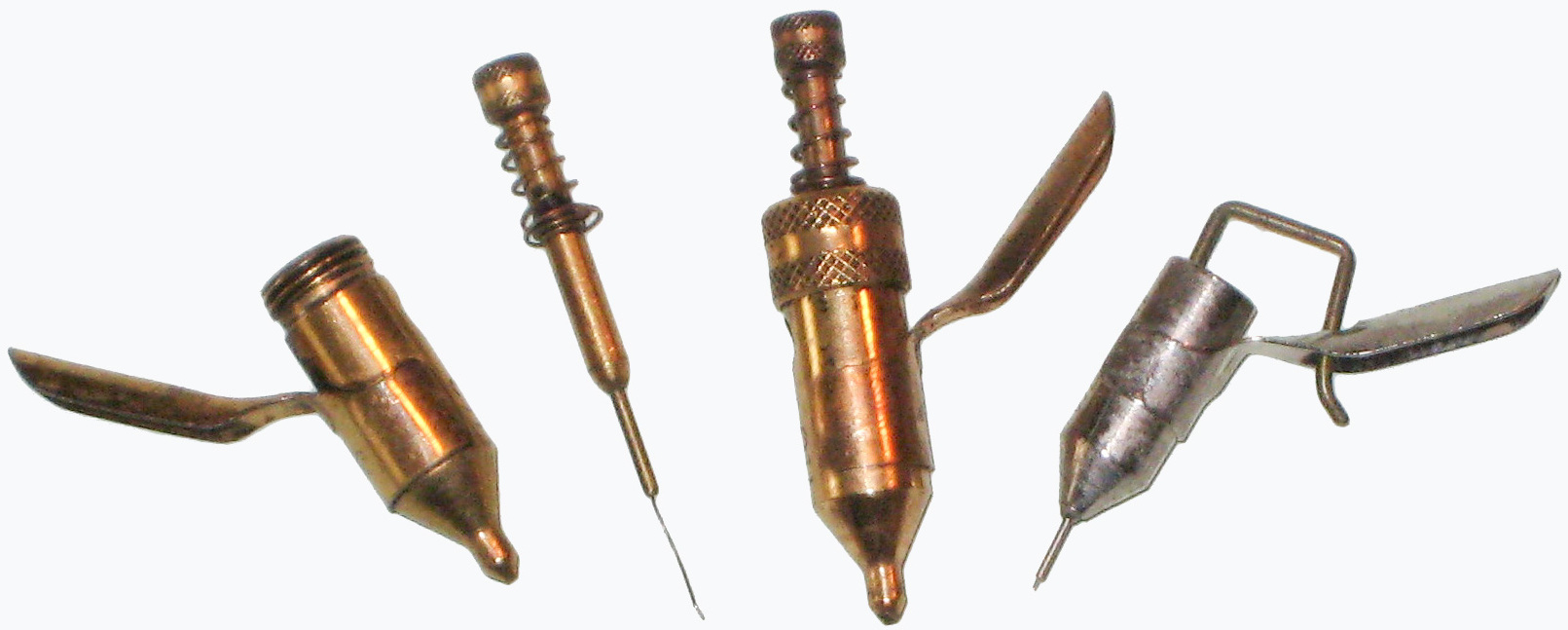
Lettering pens for lettering guide template

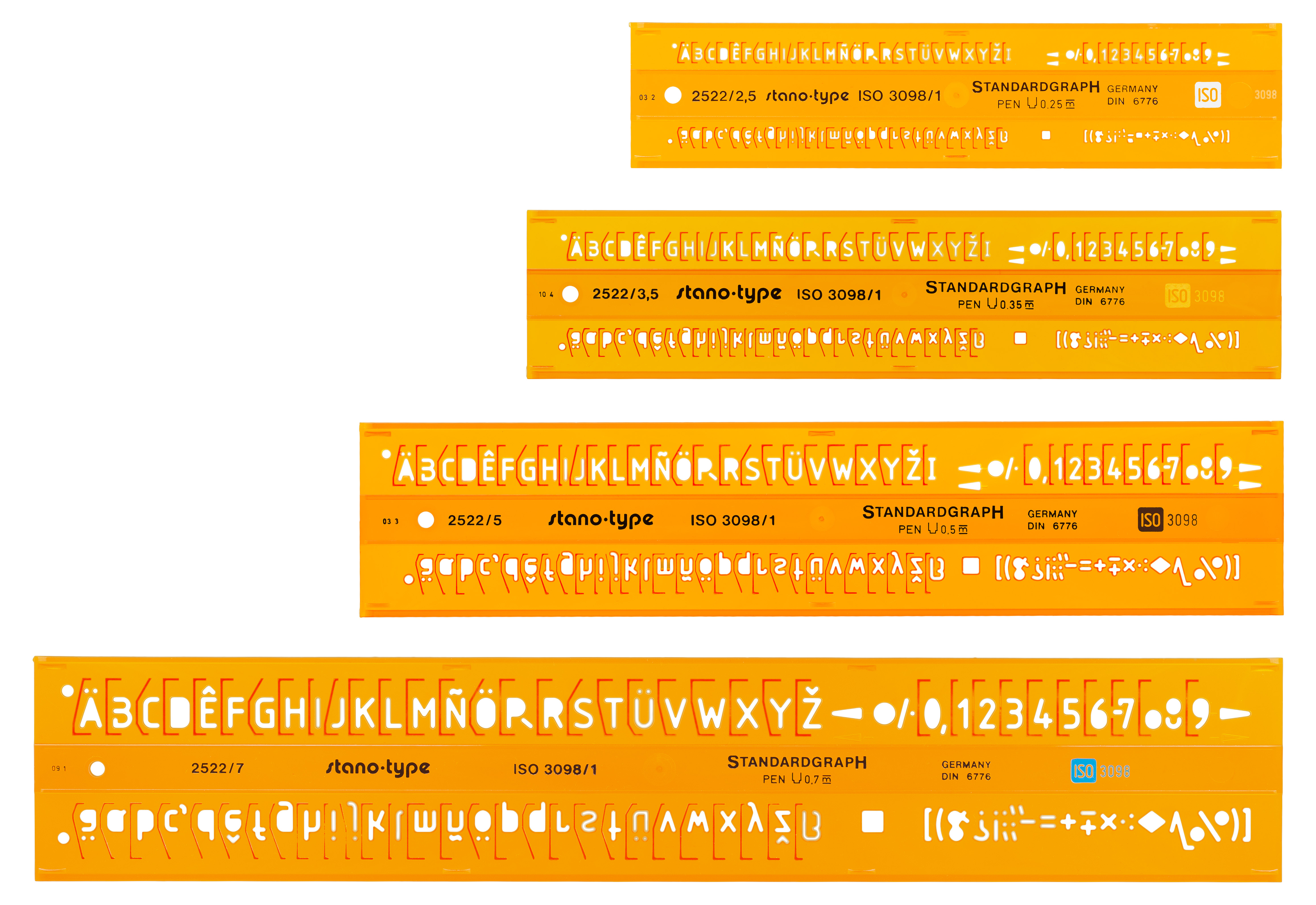
2.5 to 7 millimetres (0.1 to 0.3 in) lettering guides for technical drawings

== See also ==
- Graphic design
- Technical lettering
- Pantograph
