= Battle of Peleliu order of battle =

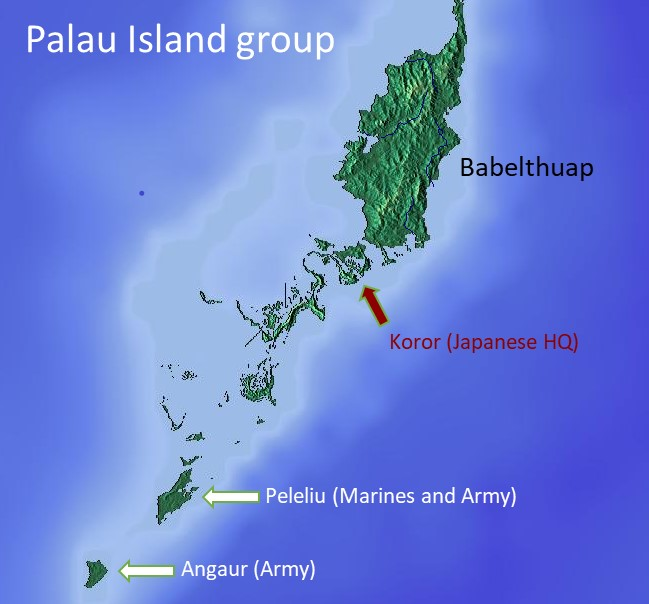
Palau Islands relief map showing Operation Stalemate II

On 15 September 1944, United States Marine Corps forces landed on the southwestern shore of the island of Peleliu in the Palau island chain, 470 nautical miles due east of the Philippine island of Mindanao. This action, called Operation Stalemate II by American planners, was a phase in the Pacific Theatre of World War II. Whether possession of the island was necessary for the Allied cause has been the source of much controversy.

Peleliu was the least-known island that the US invaded in the Pacific Theatre. Pre-war maps were sorely lacking and the results of photoreconnaissance were poor. Thus, the Marines were completely unprepared for the hard, sharp surface of blistering hot bare coral over much of the landing area.

Defeating the entrenched Japanese forces turned out to be far more arduous than anticipated. Two regiments of Army troops were unexpectedly needed to finish conquest of the island. Peleliu was finally declared secure on 15 November 1944.

== US Command Structure ==
Naval commanders for Operation Stalemate II

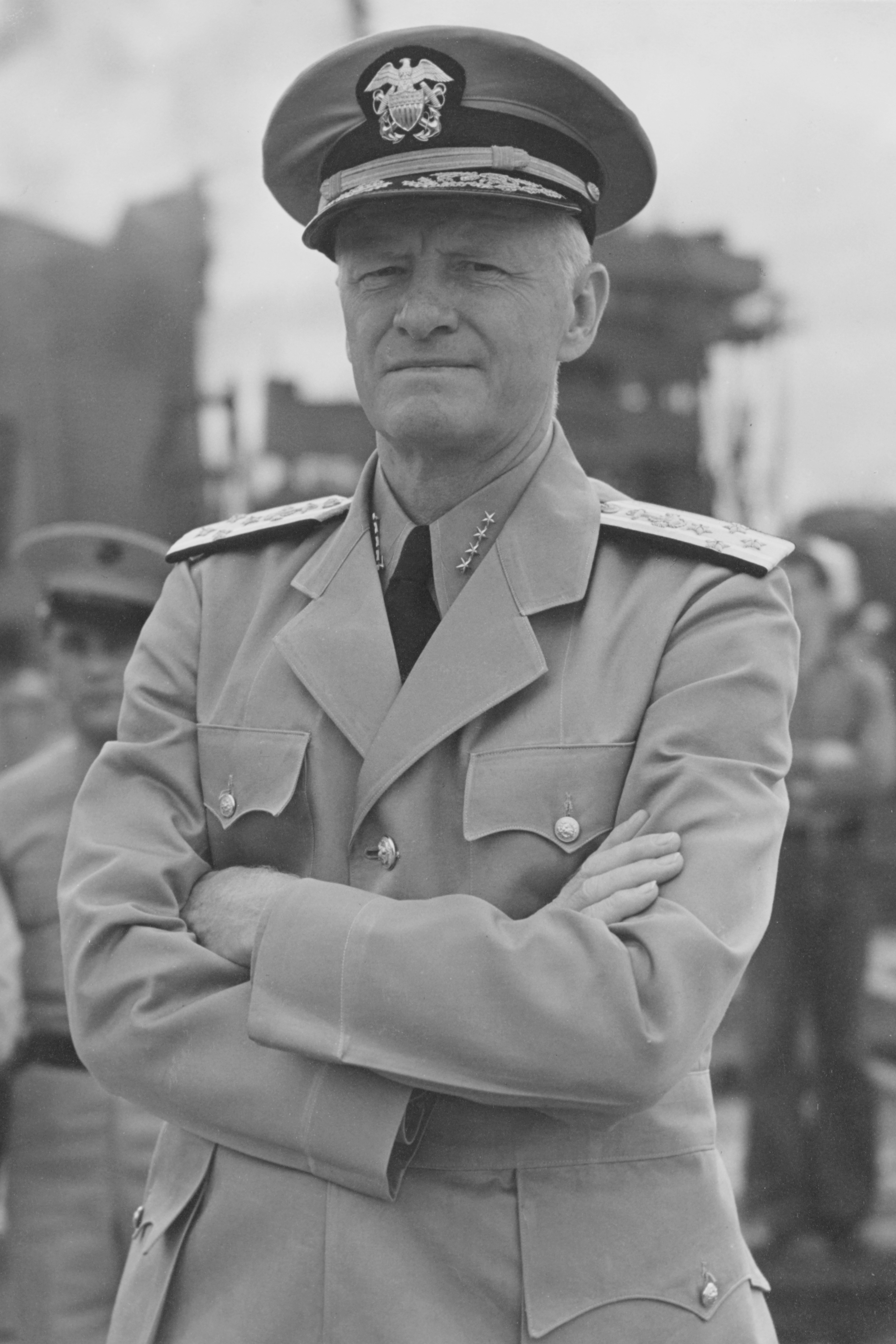
Adm. Chester W. Nimitz

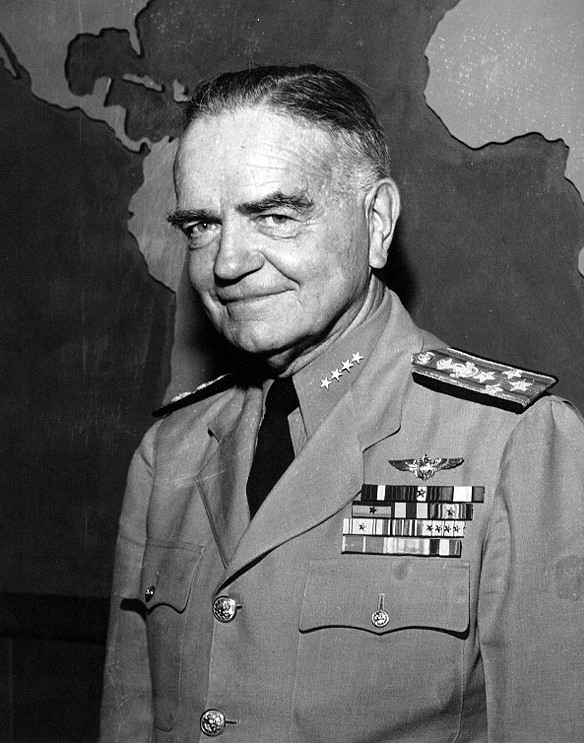
Admiral William F. Halsey Jr.

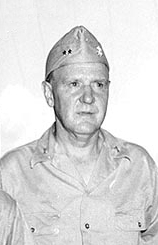
Rear Adm. Theodore S. Wilkinson

=== Naval ===
The roles of Commander in Chief, Pacific Ocean Areas (CINCPOA) and Commander in Chief, U.S. Pacific Fleet (CINCPAC), were both exercised by Admiral Chester W. Nimitz from his headquarters at Pearl Harbor, Hawaii.

Since the Palaus lie in the Southwest Pacific, their capture was the responsibility of the U.S. Third Fleet, led by Admiral William F. Halsey from aboard his flagship, fast battleship New Jersey.

The ships and embarked troops of Operation Stalemate II, were under the overall command of Rear Admiral Theodore S. Wilkinson aboard amphibious command ship Mount Olympus.

=== Ground Troops ===
Marine Corps planning for Stalemate II was conducted by Major General Julian C. Smith. However, because the III Amphibious Corps was still struggling with the capture of Guam, operational command for the Palaus was turned over to Major General Roy S. Geiger.

III Marine Amphibious Corps (Maj. Gen. Roy S. Geiger, USMC)

Peleliu landing, 15 Sep: 1st Marine Division (Maj. Gen. William H. Rupertus, USMC) (Note: Rupertus was not at peak effectiveness, having broken an ankle at Guadalcanal during landing practice for Stalemate II, but Smith learned of this too late to make a change in divisional command.)
Angaur landing, 17 Sep: 81st Infantry ("Wildcat") Division (Maj. Gen. Paul J. Mueller, USA)

== US Forces ==
Ground force commanders at Peleliu

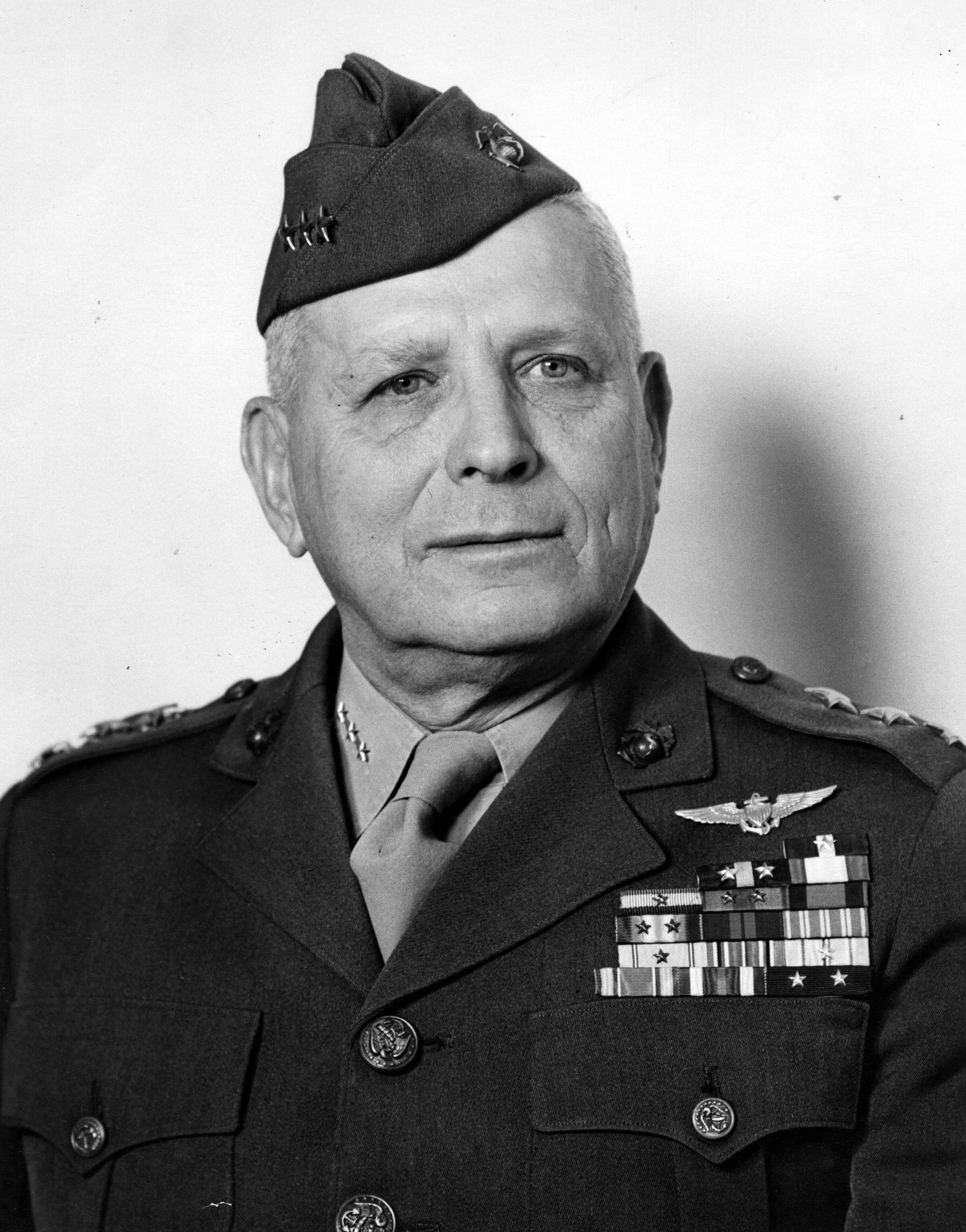
Roy S. Geiger, USMC, as a lieutenant general

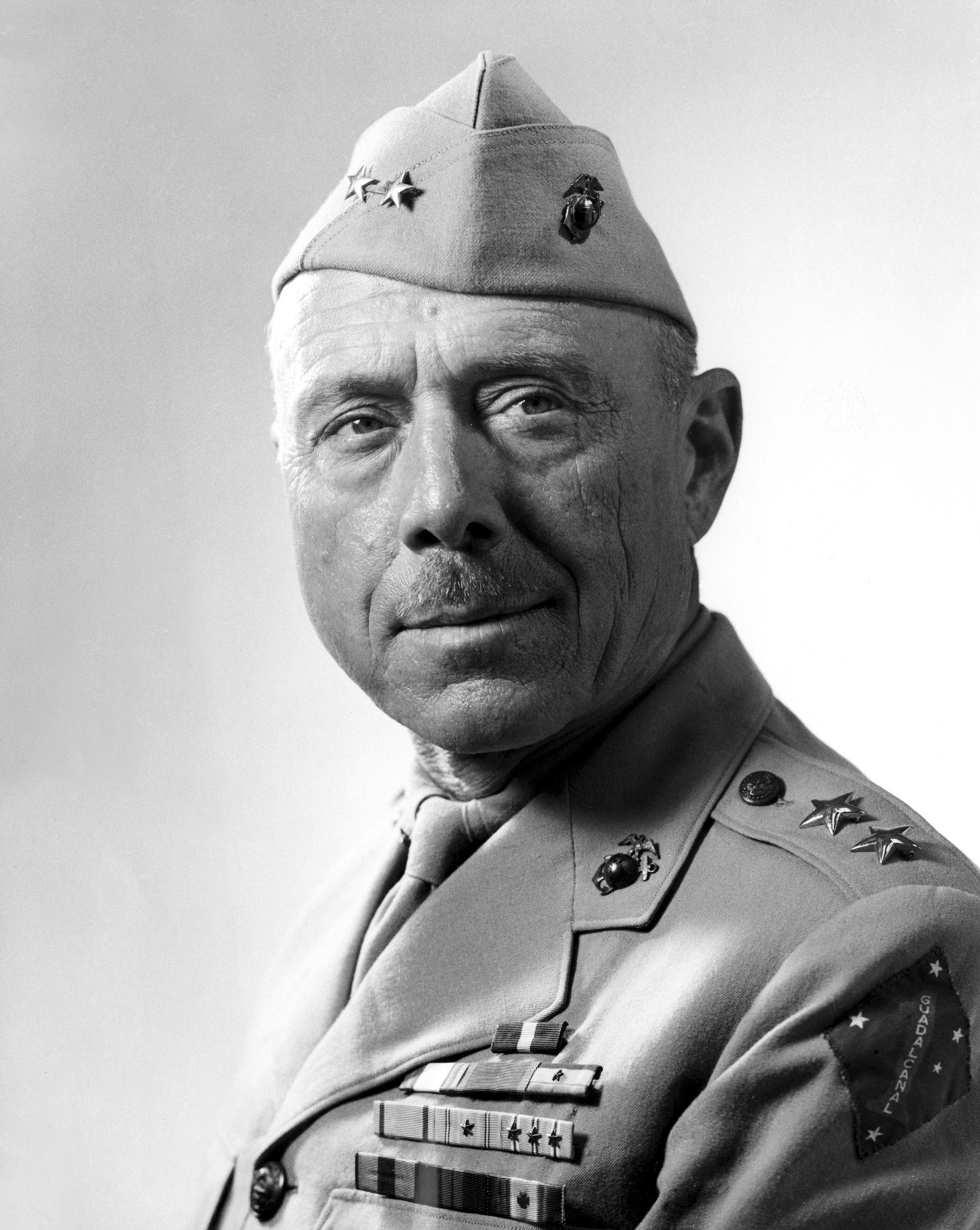
Maj. Gen. William H. Rupertus, USMC

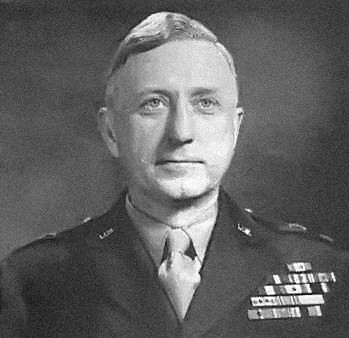
Maj. Gen. Paul J. Mueller, USA

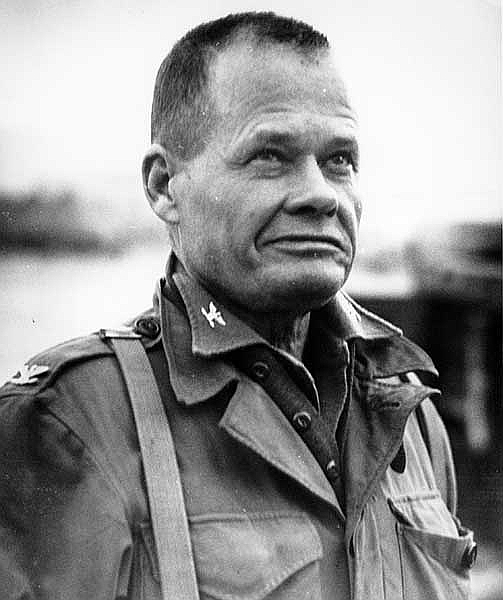
Col. Lewis B. "Chesty" Puller

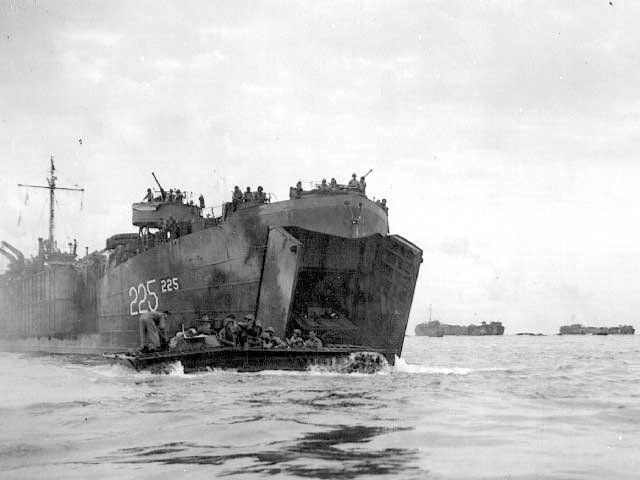
LST-225 landing Marines at Peleliu

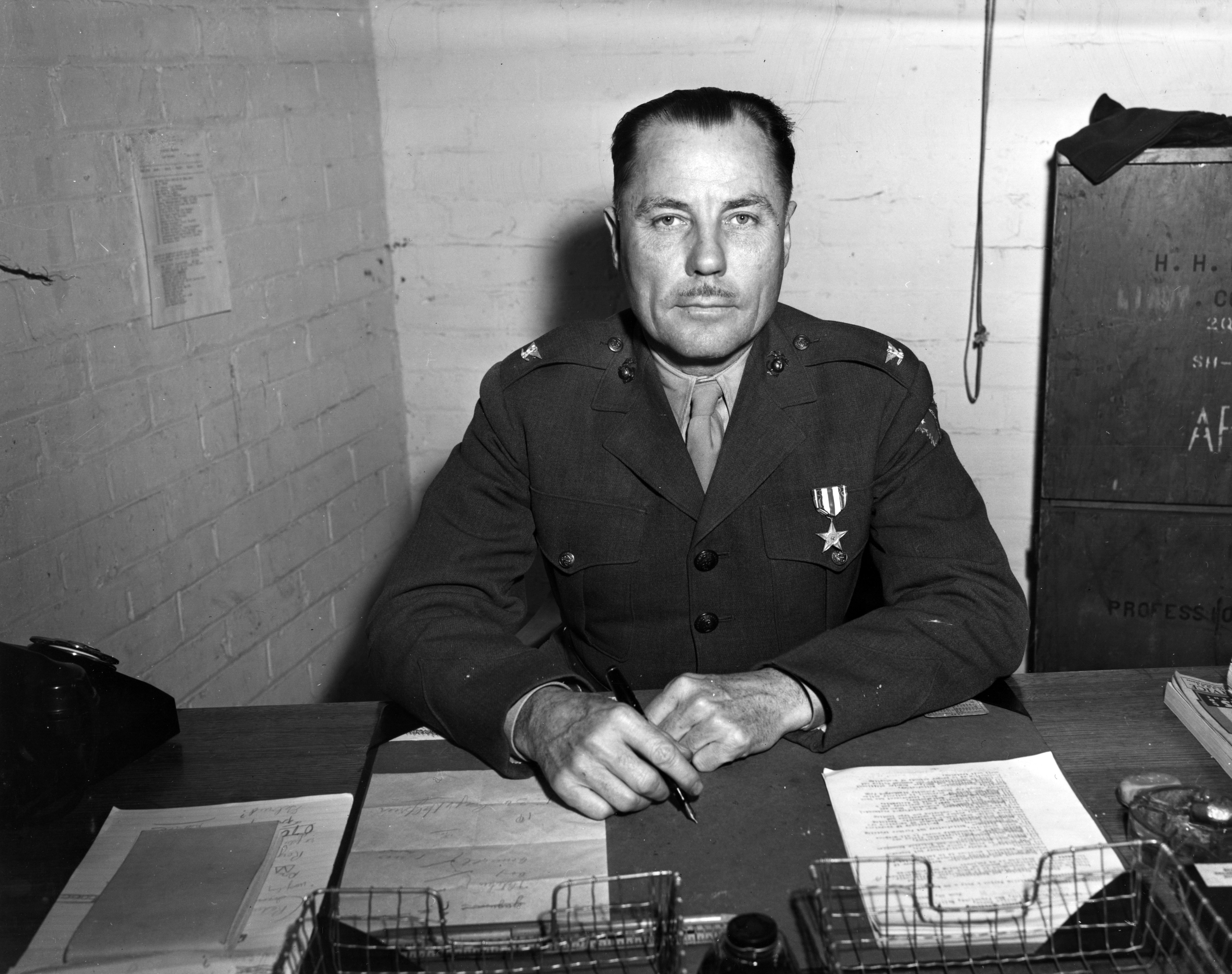
Herman H.Hanneken as a Colonel

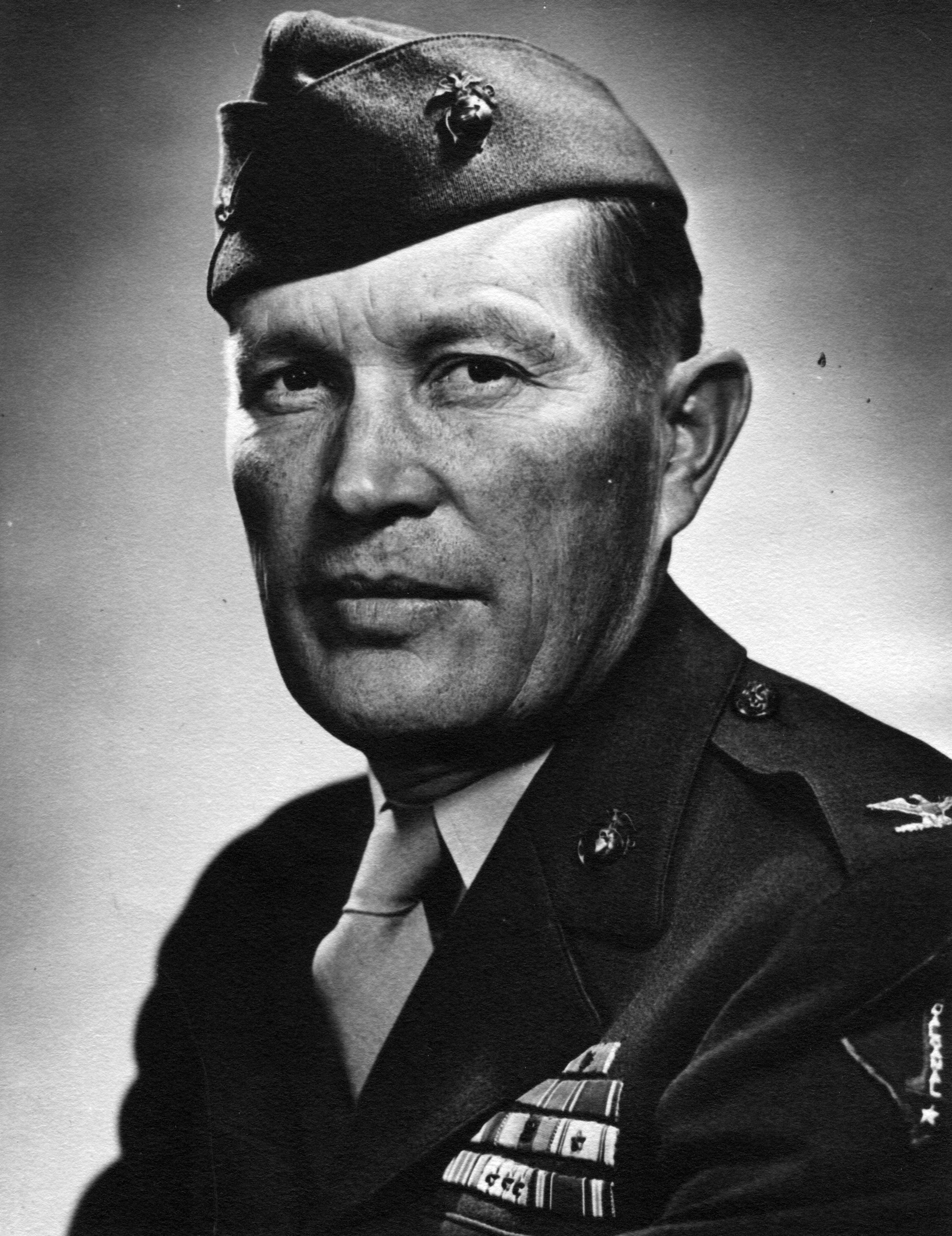
Col. William H. Harrison

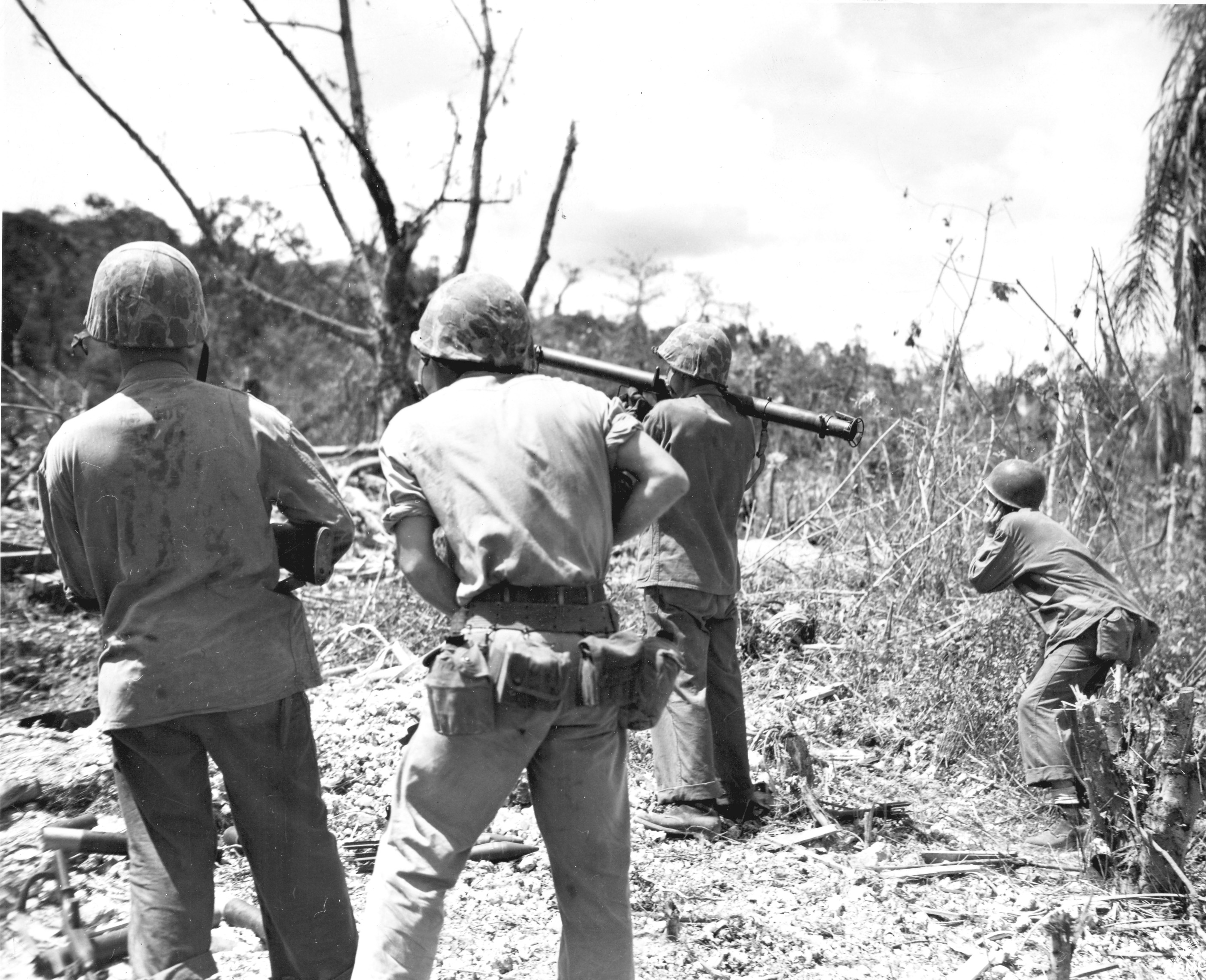
Marine bazooka team on Peleliu

=== Capture of Peleliu ===
III Marine Amphibious Corps
Major General Roy S. Geiger, USMC

1st Marine Division
Major General William H. Rupertus (Note: Rupertus was not at peak effectiveness, having broken an ankle at Guadalcanal during landing practice for Stalemate II, but Geiger learned of this too late to make a change in divisional command.)
Asst. Div. Cmdr.: Brig. Gen. Oliver P. Smith (Note: While commanding the 1st Marine Division at the Chosin Reservoir during the Korean War, Smith announced, "Retreat, hell ... we're just advancing in a different direction.")

Chief of Staff: Col. John T. Selden
CO HQ Battalion: Col. Joseph F. Hankins (KIA 3 Oct), Lt. Col. Austin C. Shofner (Note: Captured on Corregidor, Shofner took part in the only successful escape from a Japanese POW camp.)
Personnel officer (G-1): Maj. William E. Benedict (to 23 Sep), Lt. Col. Harold O. Deakin
Intelligence officer (G-2): Lt. Col. John W. Scott Jr.
Operations officer (G-3): Lt. Col. Lewis J. Fields
Logistics officer (G-4): Lt. Col. Harvey C. Tschirgi

Left sector (White Beaches 1 & 2)

1st Marine Regiment
Colonel Lewis B. "Chesty" Puller (Note: Became the most decorated Marine in the history of the Corps.)
Exec. Ofc.: Lt. Col. Richard P. Ross Jr.

1st Battalion (Maj. Raymond G. Davis)
2nd Battalion (Note: Robert Leckie, later a prolific author on military topics including the best-selling Helmet for My Pillow, was wounded while serving in Company H of this unit.) (Lt. Col. Russell E. Honsowetz)
3rd Battalion (Lt. Col. Stephen V. Sabol)
Co. A of the following:

1st Engineer Battalion, 1st Pioneer Battalion, 1st Medical Battalion, 1st Tank Battalion

Center sector (Orange Beaches 1 & 2)

5th Marine Regiment
Colonel Harold D. "Bucky" Harris
Exec. Ofc.: Lt. Col. Lewis W. Walt

1st Battalion (Lt. Col. Robert W. Boyd)
2nd Battalion (Maj. Gordon D. Gayle)
3rd Battalion (Note: Eugene B. Sledge, author of the noted memoir With the Old Breed: At Peleliu and Okinawa, served in Company K of this unit.) (Lt. Col. Austin C. Shofner (Note: Captured on Corregidor, Shofner took part in the only successful escape from a Japanese POW camp.) (to 15 Sep), Maj. John C. Gustafson)
Co. B of the following:

1st Engineer Battalion, 1st Pioneer Battalion, 1st Medical Battalion, 1st Tank Battalion (reduced)

Right sector (Orange Beach 3)

7th Marine Regiment
Colonel Herman H. "Hard-Headed" Hanneken
Exec. Ofc.: Lt. Col. Norman Hussa

1st Battalion (Lt. Col. John J. Gormley)
2nd Battalion (Lt. Col. Spenser S. Berger)
3rd Battalion (Maj. Edward H. Hurst)
Co. C of the following:

1st Engineer Battalion, 1st Pioneer Battalion, 1st Medical Battalion, 1st Tank Battalion (reduced)

Landed after First Waves on D-Day

11th Marine Regiment (Artillery)
Colonel William H. Harrison
Exec. Ofc.: Lt. Col. Edison L. Lyman

1st Battalion (Lt. Col. Richard W. Wallace)
2nd Battalion (Lt. Col. Noah P. Wood, Jr.)
3rd Battalion (Lt. Col. Charles M. Nees)
4th Battalion (Lt. Col. Louie C.Reinberg)

Other units

12th Antiaircraft Artillery Battalion
1st Amphibian Tractor Battalion
3rd Armored Amphibian Tractor Battalion
4th, 5th, 6th Marine War Dog Platoons
UDT 6 and UDT 7

=== Capture of Angaur ===
81st Infantry ("Wildcat") Division (Army)
Major General Paul J. Mueller
Conquest of Angaur, 17 - 20 Sep

321st Infantry Regiment (also landed on Peleliu, 23 Sep)
323rd Infantry Regiment (also landed on Peleliu, 15 Oct)

Attached:

710th Tank Battalion (also landed on Peleliu, 15 Oct)

== Japanese forces ==
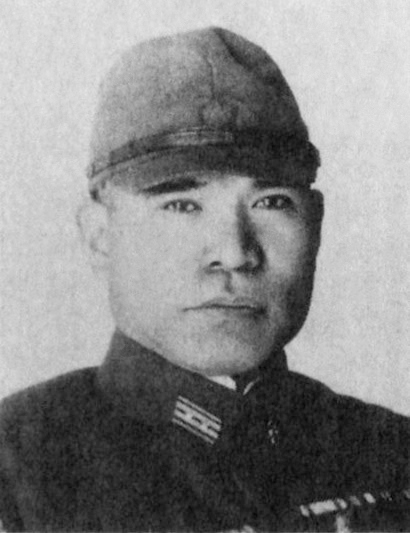
Lt. Col. Kunio Nakagawa

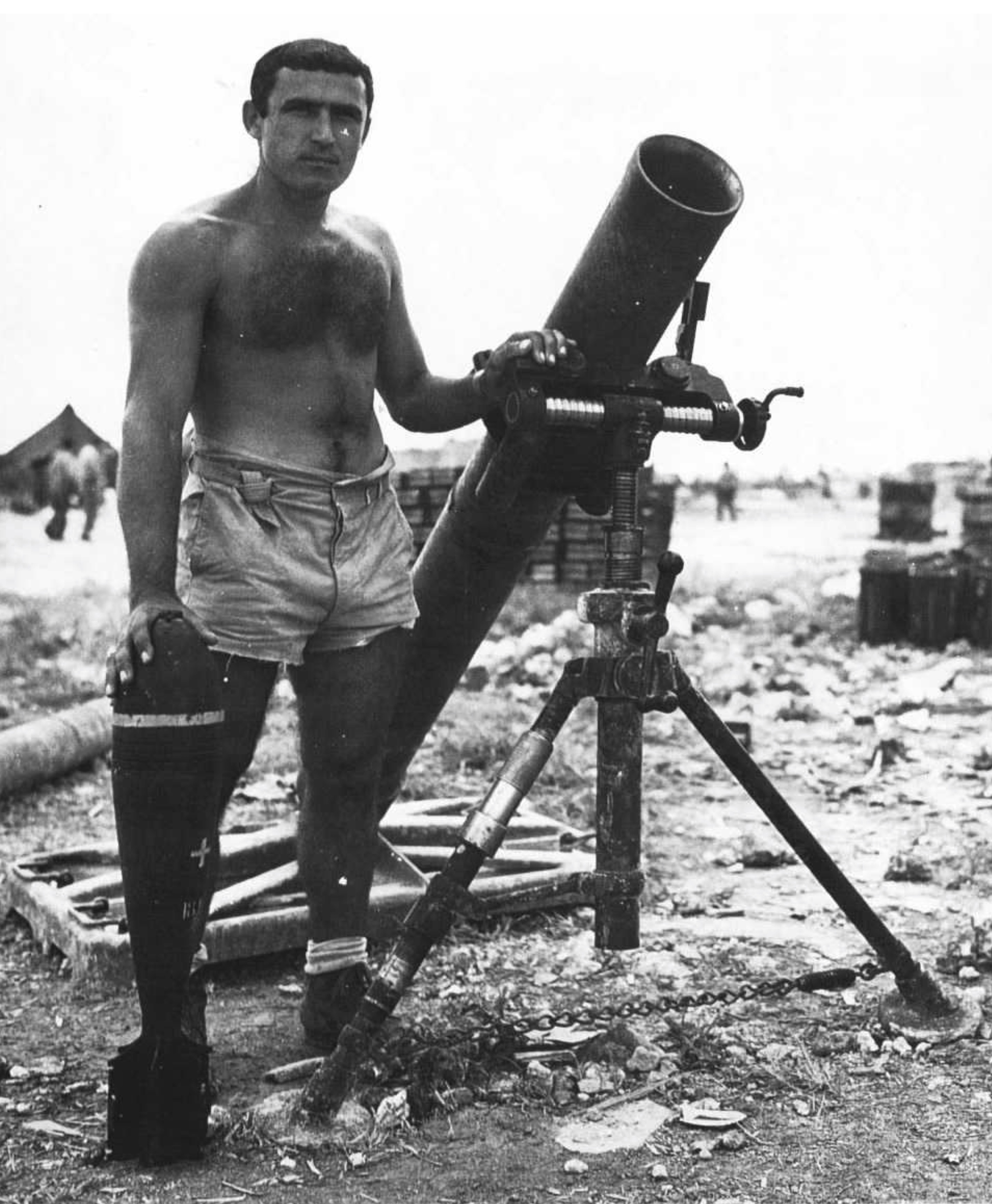
Marine with captured Japanese 141mm mortar

Palau District Group
Lieutenant General Inoue Sadao (Note: "...stern-voice and strict disciplinarian;" served 10-year sentence on Guam for war crimes.) (HQ on Koror Island)
Vice Admiral Yoshioka Ito
Major General Kenjiro Murai (Note: Sadao sent Murai to Peleliu to provide sufficiently high Army rank to balance the command authority of Vice Adm. Ito, who was nominally in charge of Navy forces in the lower Palaus.)

14th Division (Lt. Gen. Sadao)
Peleliu Sector Unit (Lt. Col. Kunio Nakagawa (Note: Committed suicide along with Murai as the struggle for the Umurbrogol Pocket neared its end.))

2nd Infantry Regiment, Reinforced

2nd Bttn. / 2nd Infantry Regiment
3rd Bttn. / 2nd Infantry Regiment
3rd Bttn. / 15th Infantry Regiment
346th Bttn. / 53rd Independent Mixed Brigade

== See also ==
Orders of battle involving United States Marine forces in the Pacific Theatre of World War II:

- Battle of Guadalcanal order of battle
- Battle of Tarawa order of battle
- Battle of Saipan order of battle
- Guam (1944) order of battle
- Battle of Leyte opposing forces
- Battle of Iwo Jima order of battle
- Okinawa ground order of battle

== Bibliography ==
- Clark, George B. (2006). The Six Marine Divisions in the Pacific: Every Campaign of World War II. Jefferson, North Carolina: McFarland and Co. ISBN 978-0-7864-2769-7.
- Moran, Jim; Gordon L. Rottman (2004). Peleliu 1944: The Forgotten Corner Of Hell. Oxford: Osprey Publishing. ISBN 1-8417-6512-0.
- Morison, Samuel Eliot (1953). Leyte, June 1944 – January 1945. History of United States Naval Operations in World War II. Vol. XII. Boston: Little, Brown and Co. LCCN 47-1571.
