= Battle of Peleliu =

World War II battle in the Pacific theater

- Part of the Mariana and Palau Islands campaign of the Pacific War (World War II)
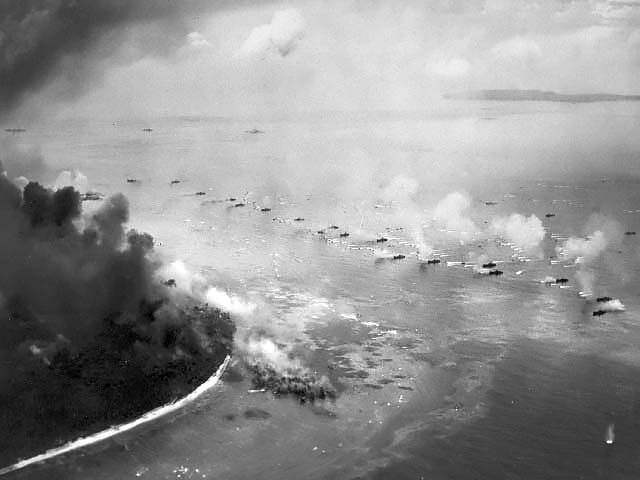
- The first wave of U.S. Marines in LVTs during the invasion of Peleliu on 15 September 1944
Date	15 September – 27 November 1944 (2 months, 1 week and 5 days)
Location	Peleliu, Palau Islands 7°00′N 134°15′E
Result	American victory

Belligerents
United States	Japan

Commanders and leaders
William H. Rupertus; Paul J. Mueller; Roy Geiger; Herman H. Hanneken; Harold D. Harris; Lewis B. Puller	Sadae Inoue; Kunio Nakagawa ‡‡ Murai Kenjiro ‡‡

Units involved
III Amphibious Corps: 1st Marine Division; 81st Infantry Division; Additional support units	Peleliu garrison: 14th Infantry Division; 49th Mixed Brigade; 45th Guard Force; 46th Base Force; Additional support units

Strength
47,561	> 12,393 across south Palau islands (10,900 on Peleliu/and Ngesebus, of whom about 6,500 were trained combat infantry); 17 tanks

Casualties and losses
Total (Palau Islands): 1,989–2,143 battle deaths; 8,514 wounded and injured; Breakdown by locations: Peleliu and Ngesebus Islands (Note: Marines: at least 1,252 killed, DOW, missing presumed dead, and 5,274 wounded. Army: at least 260 killed/DOW and 1,008 wounded/injured. Navy: 50 killed, 11 DOW, 249 wounded. Navy medical records report a higher figure of 1,273 battle deaths for the Marines, while Appendix H of "History of the USMC in World War II vol. IV" gives 1,336 killed, died of wounds, missing presumed dead, and 5,450 wounded, though a substantial part of those who died of wounds are also recorded as WIAs.); 1,573+ battle deaths; 6,531+ wounded and injured Angaur Island (Note: All Army casualties); 260+ battle deaths; 1,354+ wounded and injured Navy (excluding Peleliu Island); 134 battle deaths; 255 wounded; Breakdown by service: Marines; 1,252– 1,336 killed, died of wounds, missing presumed dead; ~5,200–5,274 wounded Army; 542–612 killed, died of wounds, missing; 2,736 wounded and injured Navy; 195 killed and died of wounds; 504 wounded	Total (Palau Islands): 12,033 dead (excluding stragglers); 360 prisoners (excluding stragglers); Breakdown by locations: Peleliu and Ngesebus Islands; 10,695 dead; 301 prisoners Angaur Island; 1,338 dead; 59 prisoners
- Location within Palau Battle of Peleliu (Asia) Battle of Peleliu (Pacific Ocean)

The Battle of Peleliu, codenamed Operation Stalemate II by the US military, was fought between the United States and Japan during the Mariana and Palau Islands campaign of World War II, from 15 September to 27 November 1944, on the island of Peleliu.

US marines of the 1st Marine Division and then soldiers of the US Army's 81st Infantry Division fought to capture an airfield on the small coral island of Peleliu. The battle was part of a larger offensive campaign known as Operation Forager, which ran from June to November 1944 in the Pacific War.

Major General William Rupertus, the commander of the 1st Marine Division, predicted that the island would be secured within four days. However, after repeated Imperial Japanese Army defeats in previous island campaigns, Japan had developed new island-defense tactics and well-crafted fortifications, which allowed them to offer stiff resistance and extended the battle to more than two months. The heavily outnumbered Japanese defenders put up such staunch resistance, often fighting to the death in the name of the Japanese Emperor, that the island became known in Japanese as the "Emperor's Island."

In the US, the battle was controversial because of the island's negligible strategic value and the high casualty rate incurred by American troops during the fighting, which exceeded that of all other amphibious operations during the Pacific War. The National Museum of the Marine Corps called it "the bitterest battle of the war for marines" and ended up lasting approximately 74 days when it was only expected to take 4–5 days.

== Background ==
By 1944, American victories in the Southwest and Central Pacific had brought the war closer to Japan, with American bombers able to strike at the Japanese main islands from air bases secured during the Mariana Islands campaign (June–August 1944). There was disagreement among the U.S. Joint Chiefs over two proposed strategies to defeat the Japanese Empire. The strategy proposed by General Douglas MacArthur called for the recapture of the Philippines, followed by the capture of Okinawa, then an attack on the Japanese home islands. Admiral Chester W. Nimitz favored a more direct strategy of bypassing the Philippines but seizing Okinawa and Taiwan as staging areas to an attack on the Japanese mainland, followed by the future invasion of Japan's southernmost islands.

The 1st Marine Division had already been chosen to make the assault. U.S. President Franklin D. Roosevelt traveled to Pearl Harbor to personally meet both MacArthur and Nimitz and hear their arguments. In the end, MacArthur's strategy was chosen. However, before MacArthur could retake the Philippines, the Palau Islands, specifically Peleliu and Angaur, were to be neutralized and an airfield built to protect the southern flank of MacArthur's planned landings on the Philippines.

== Preparations ==
=== Japanese ===
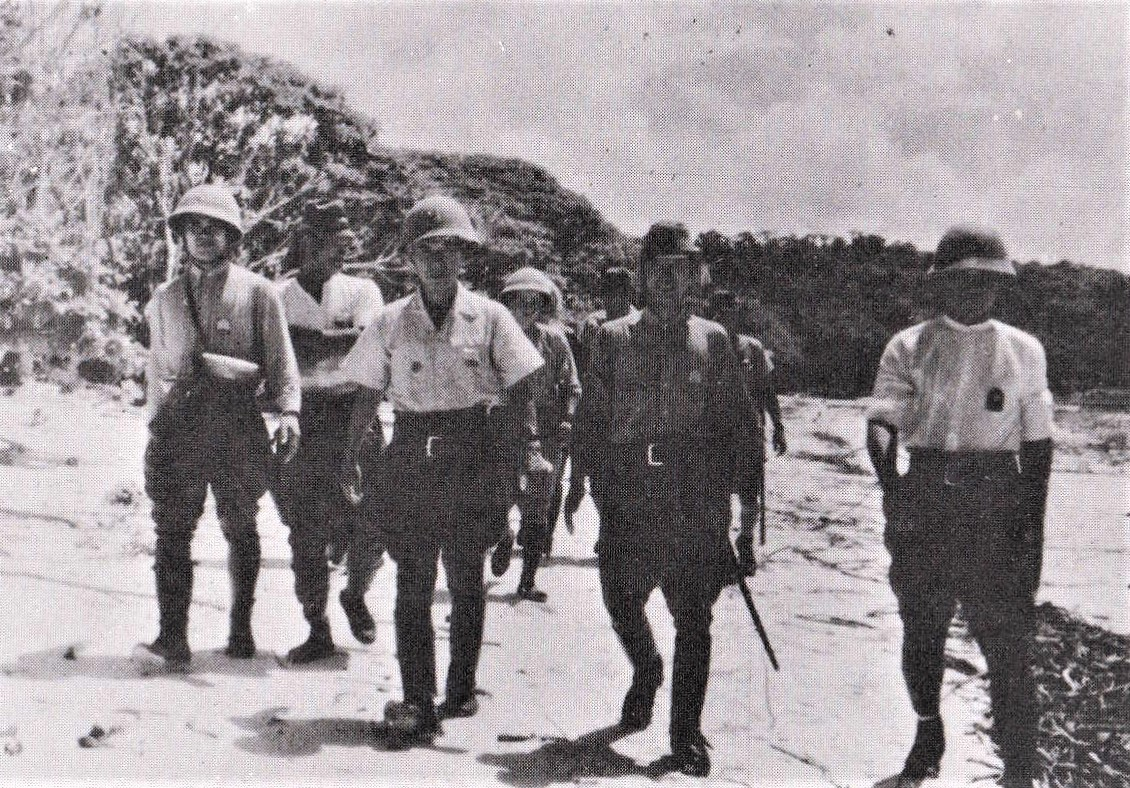
Imperial Japanese Army soldiers in Peleliu

By 1944, Peleliu was occupied by about 5,500 Japanese troops of the 14th Infantry Division. Considered a crack unit, the division had been detached from the Kwantung Army in Manchuria to garrison Peleliu after the fall of the Marshall Islands earlier in 1944, and had arrived on the island in May. Colonel Kunio Nakagawa, commander of the division's 2nd Regiment, led the preparations for the island's defense. In addition to these, there were about 4,000 naval troops, of whom about 1,500 of the 45th Base Guard Force were trained in the infantry role, the remainder were maintenance staff, air crews and other miscellaneous support troops. In addition to this, there was a large contingent of Korean and Japanese construction personnel.

After their losses in the Solomons, Gilberts, Marshalls and Marianas, the Imperial Japanese Army assembled a research team to develop new island-defense tactics. Previously, Japanese island garrisons had heavily contested enemy landings on the beach itself, rendering them vulnerable to naval bombardment. The Japanese formulated new tactics that envisioned only a token defense of the landing beaches, instead protracting the conflict by holding defensible terrain in the island interior. Peleliu's steep, twisting coral ridges were ideal for such a defense in depth. Colonel Nakagawa used this rough terrain to his advantage by ordering the construction of heavily fortified bunkers, caves, and other subterranean positions, all interlocked in a "honeycomb" system. Traditional "banzai charge" attacks were to be discontinued, as they wasted manpower and were ineffective. These changes in tactics were designed to force the Americans into a war of attrition, compelling them to spend more troops, material, and time to secure Japanese island garrisons.

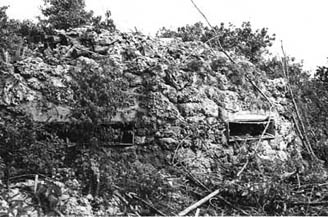
Japanese fortifications

Nakagawa's defenses were centered on Peleliu's highest point. Located at the center of Peleliu, the hills and steep ridges of Umurbrogol Mountain overlooked much of the island, including its crucial airfield. The Umurbrogol contained some 500 limestone caves, connected via tunnel by Japanese engineers. Many of these caves were former mine shafts developed by Nanyo Kohatsu Kaisha (South Seas Development Company), a Japanese firm established in 1921 primarily to develop the sugar industry in Saipan, where its headquarters were located. However, the company also owned and worked the phosphate deposits on Peleliu. The phosphate material was mined with native labor and transported via narrow gauge railcars operated by manpower to a phosphate refinery located at the wharf on Peleliu.

The mines and caves were turned into defensive positions. Engineers added sliding armored steel doors with multiple openings to many cave entrances, providing extra protection and concealment for artillery and machine guns. Cave entrances were opened or altered to be slanted as a defense against grenade and flamethrower attacks. The caves and bunkers were connected to a vast tunnel and trench system throughout central Peleliu, which allowed the Japanese to evacuate or reoccupy positions as needed, and to take advantage of shrinking interior lines.

The Japanese garrison was well armed with 81 mm (3.19 in) and 150 mm (5.9 in) mortars and 20 mm (0.79 in) anti-aircraft cannons, backed by a light tank unit and an anti-aircraft detachment. The Japanese also used the beach terrain to their advantage. The northern end of the landing beaches faced a 30-foot (9.1 m) coral promontory that overlooked the beaches from a small peninsula, a spot later known to the Marines who assaulted it simply as "The Point". Holes were blasted into The Point to accommodate a 47 mm (1.85 in) gun and six 20 mm cannons. The positions were then sealed shut, leaving only a thin slit to fire on the beaches. The Japanese constructed similar positions along the 2-mile (3.2 km) stretch of landing beaches on the western shore of Peleliu.

The beaches were also filled with thousands of obstacles for the landing craft, principally mines and a large number of heavy artillery shells buried with the fuses exposed, designed to explode when they were run over. Nakagawa placed a battalion along the beach to defend against the landing, but this unit was meant to merely delay the inevitable American advance inland. Neither Nakagawa nor his superior officers expected the garrison to survive if Peleliu was attacked, and Japanese military planners made no contingencies to evacuate any survivors.

=== American ===
Unlike the Japanese, who drastically altered their tactics for the upcoming battle, the American invasion plan was unchanged from that of previous amphibious landings, even after suffering 3,000 casualties and enduring two months of delaying tactics while overcoming entrenched Japanese defenders at the Battle of Biak. On Peleliu, American planners chose to land on the southwest beaches because of their proximity to the airfield on south Peleliu. The 1st Marine Regiment, commanded by Colonel Lewis B. "Chesty" Puller, was to land on the northern end of the beaches. The 5th Marine Regiment, under Colonel Harold Harris, would land in the center, and the 7th Marine Regiment, under Colonel Herman Hanneken, would land at the southern end.

The division's artillery regiment, the 11th Marines under Colonel William Harrison, would land after the infantry regiments. The plan was for the 1st and 7th Marines to push inland, guarding the 5th Marines' flanks and allowing them to capture the airfield located directly to the center of the landing beaches. The 5th Marines were to push across to the eastern shore, cutting the island in half. The 1st Marines would push north into the Umurbrogol, while the 7th Marines would clear the southern end of the island. Only one battalion was held in reserve, with the U.S. Army's 81st Infantry Division available for support from Angaur, just south of Peleliu.

On 4 September the Marines shipped off from their station on Pavuvu, north of Guadalcanal, a 2,100-mile (3,400 km) trip across the Pacific. A Navy Underwater Demolition Team cleared the beaches of some obstacles as warships began their pre-invasion bombardment of Peleliu on 12 September.

The battleships Pennsylvania, Maryland, Mississippi, Tennessee and Idaho, heavy cruisers Indianapolis, Louisville, Minneapolis and Portland, and light cruisers Cleveland, Denver and Honolulu, led by the command ship Mount McKinley, subjected the 6 sq mi (16 km^{2}) island to a massive three-day bombardment, pausing only to permit air strikes from the three aircraft carriers, five light aircraft carriers, and eleven escort carriers that sailed with the attack force. A total of 519 rounds of 16 in (410 mm) shells, 1,845 rounds of 14 in (360 mm) shells and 1,793 500 lb (230 kg) bombs pounded Peleliu during this period.

The Americans believed the bombardment to be successful, as Rear Admiral Jesse Oldendorf claimed that the Navy had run out of targets. In reality, most Japanese soldiers survived; even the battalion left to defend the beaches was virtually unscathed. During the initial American assault, the island's defenders exercised unusual firing discipline to avoid giving away their positions. However, the bombardment destroyed Japan's aircraft on the island and the buildings surrounding the airfield. The Japanese remained in their fortified positions, waiting to attack the American landing troops.

== Opposing forces ==
Naval command structure for Operation Stalemate II

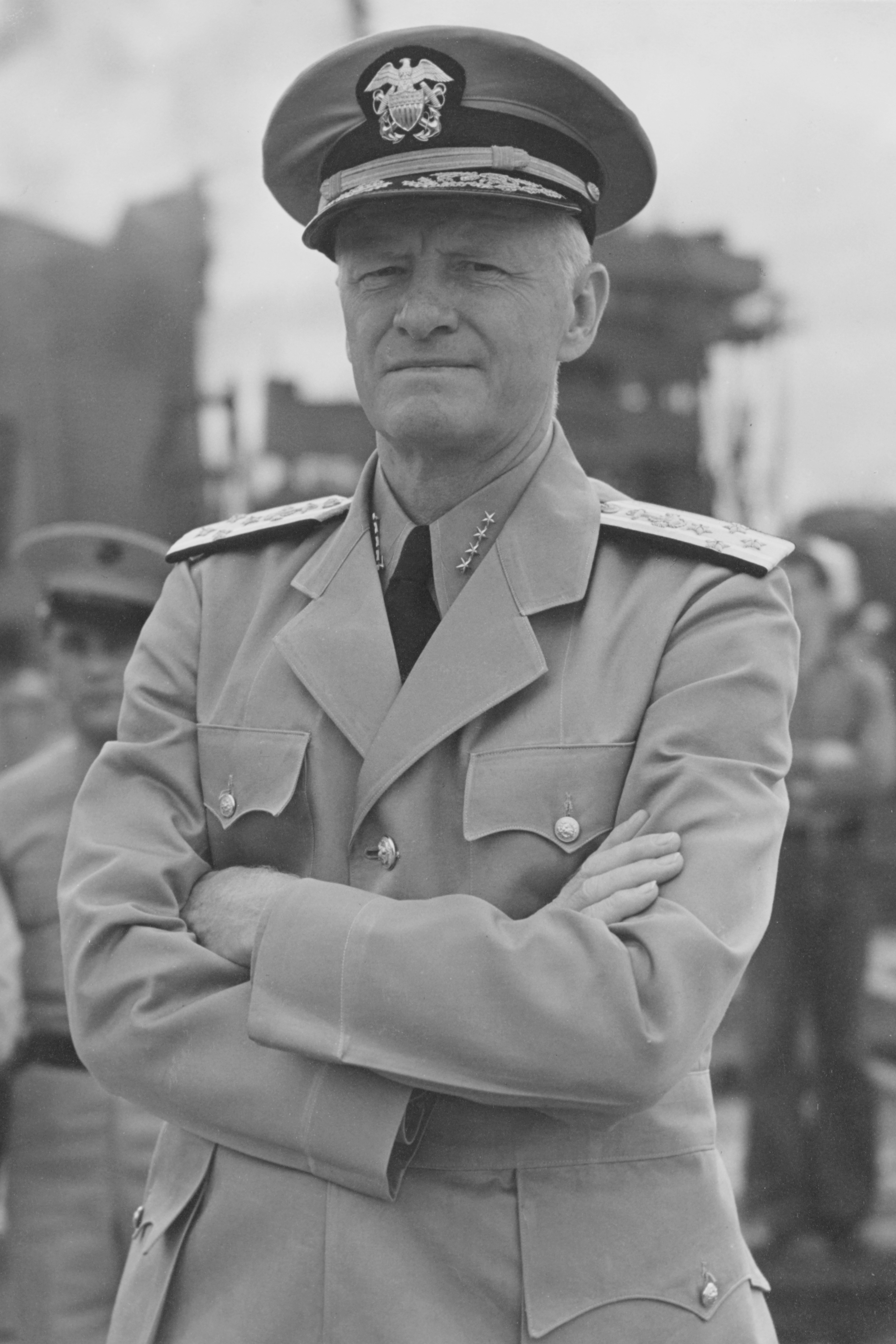
Admiral Chester W. Nimitz

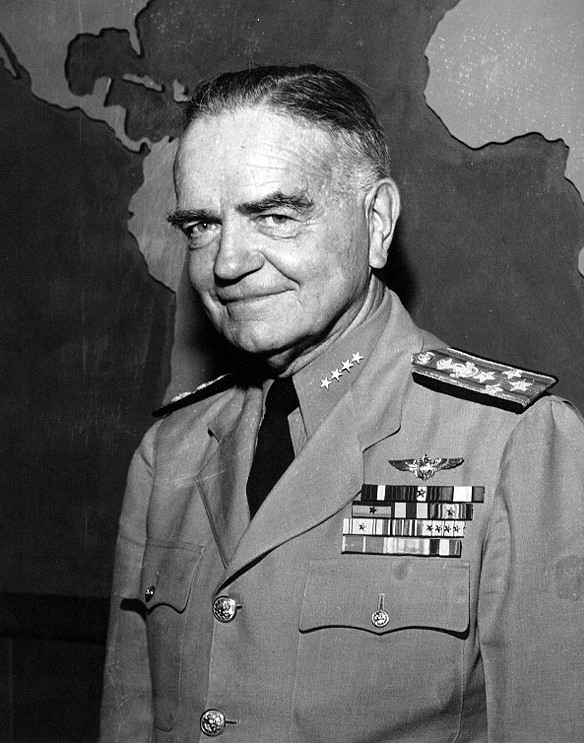
Admiral William F. Halsey Jr.

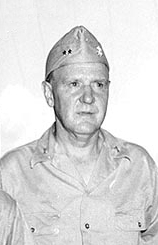
Vice Adm. Theodore S. Wilkinson

Expeditionary Troops and III Amphibious Corps commanders

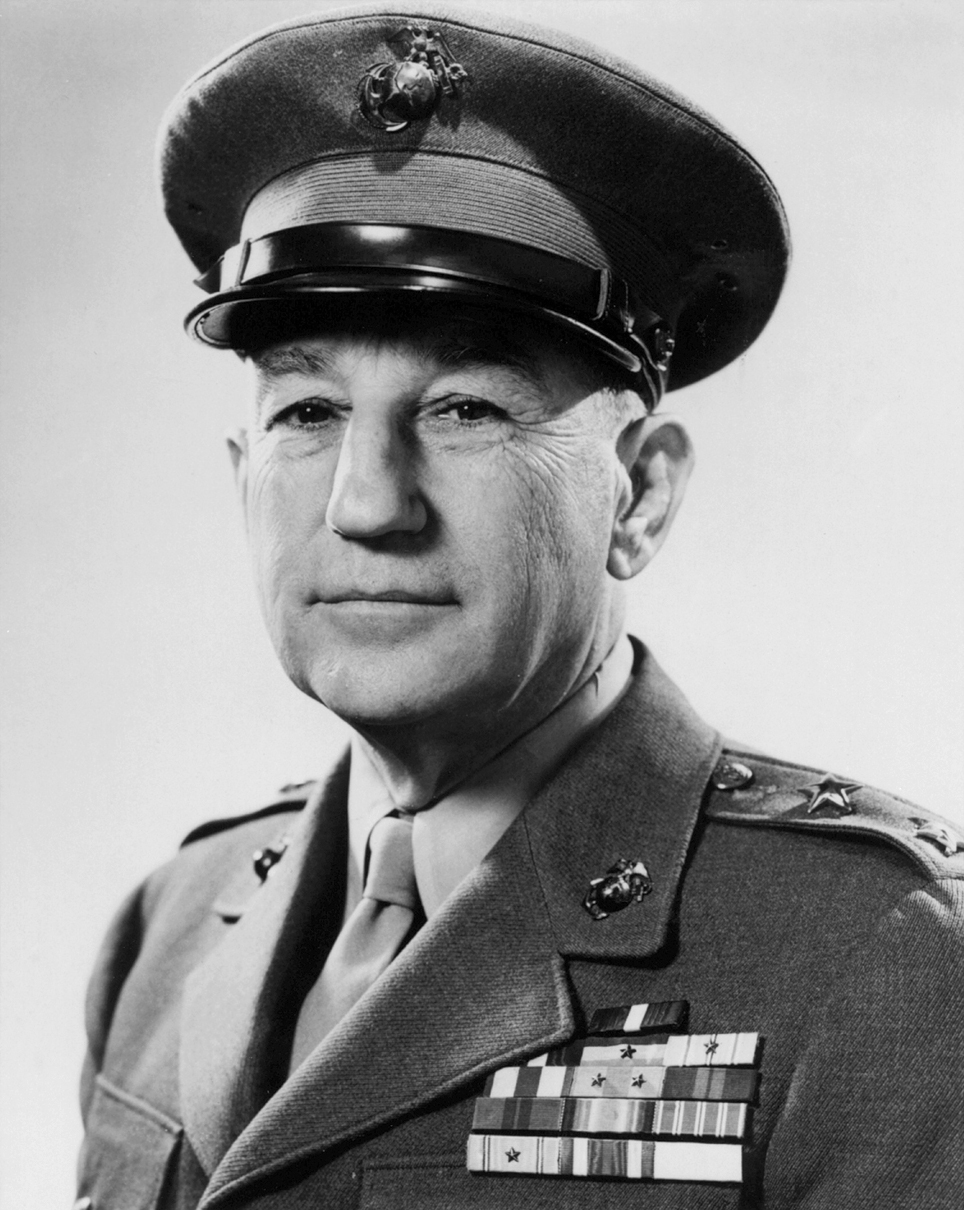
Maj. Gen. Julian C. Smith

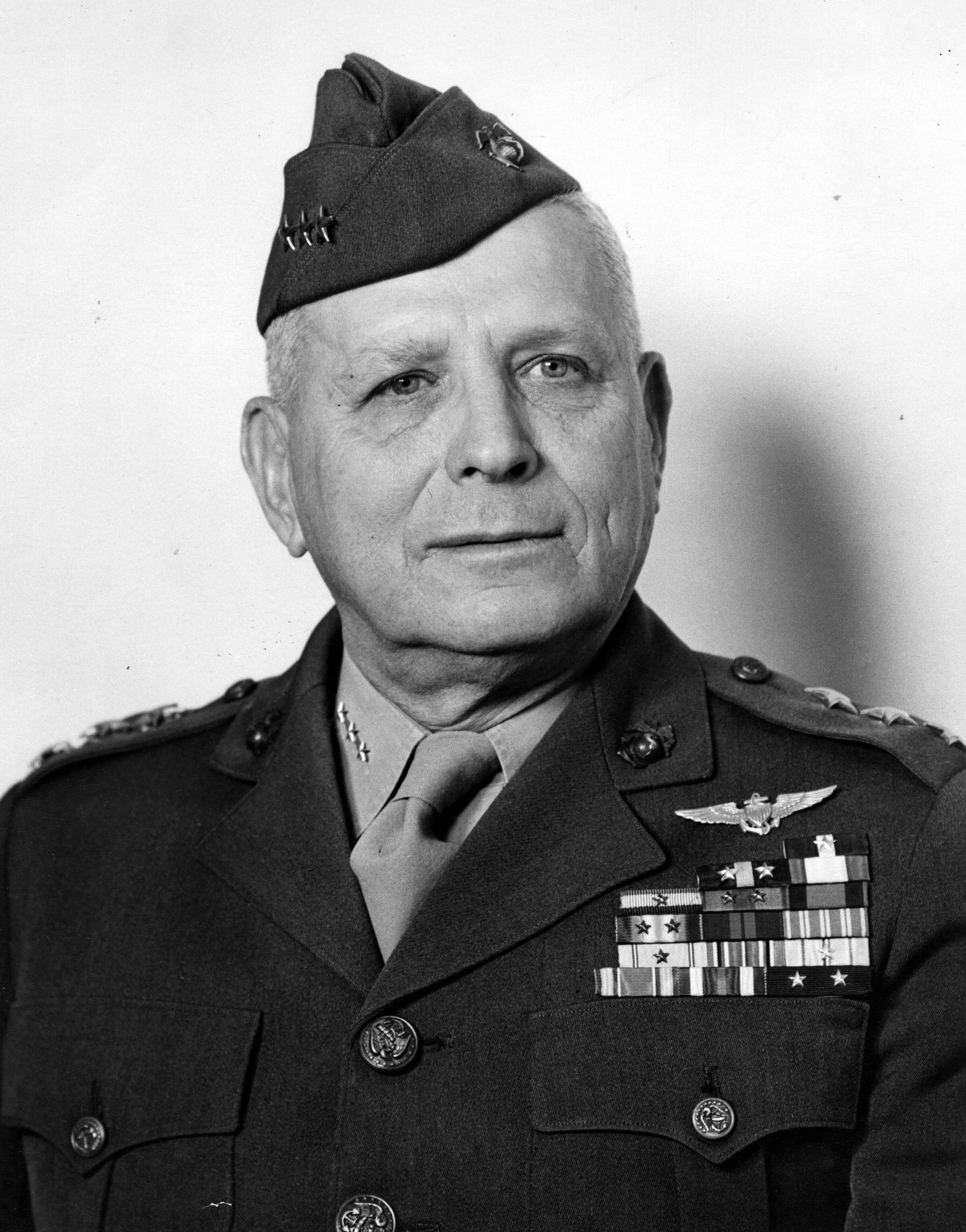
Maj. Gen. Roy S. Geiger

Marine ground commanders on Peleliu

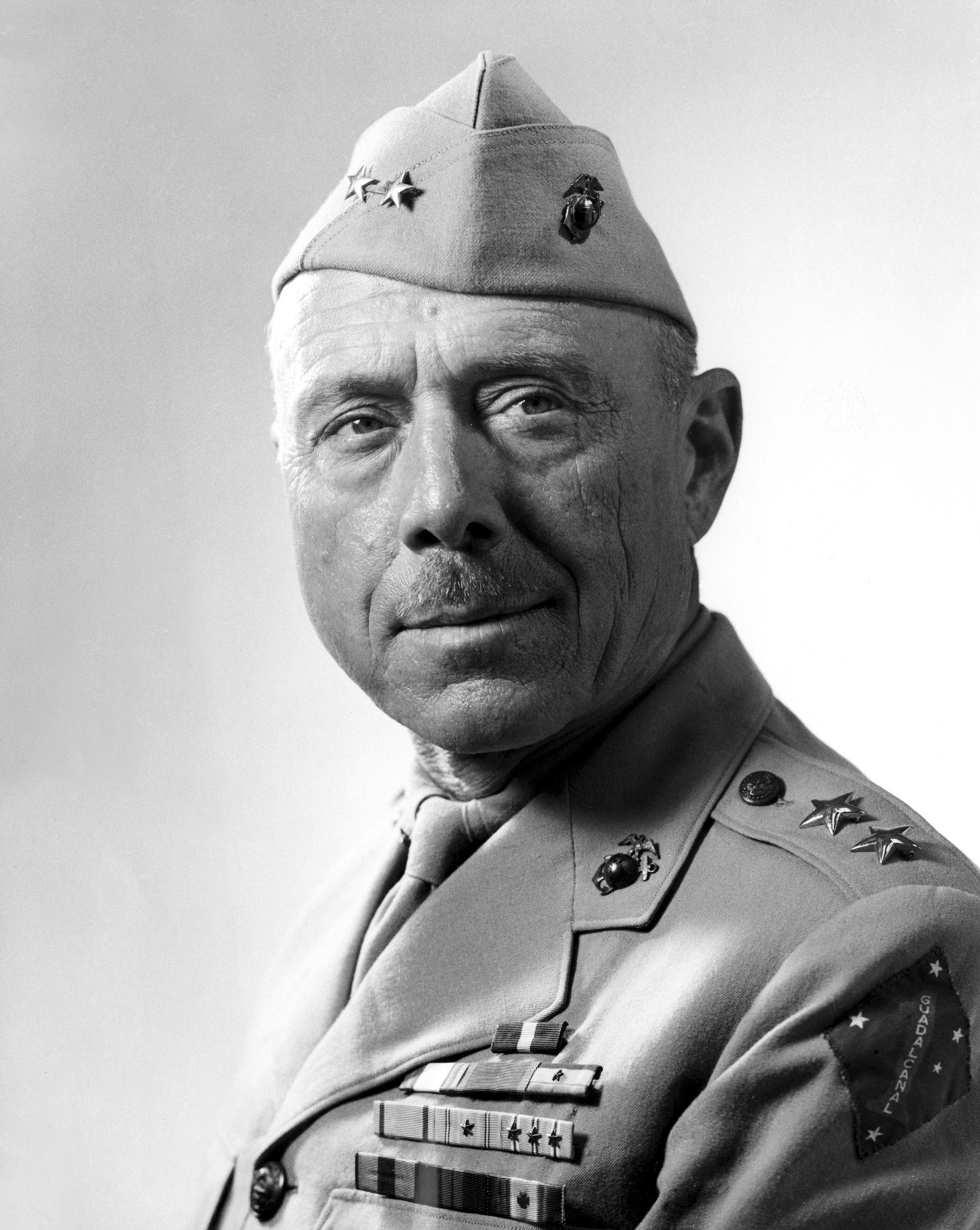
Maj. Gen. William H. Rupertus

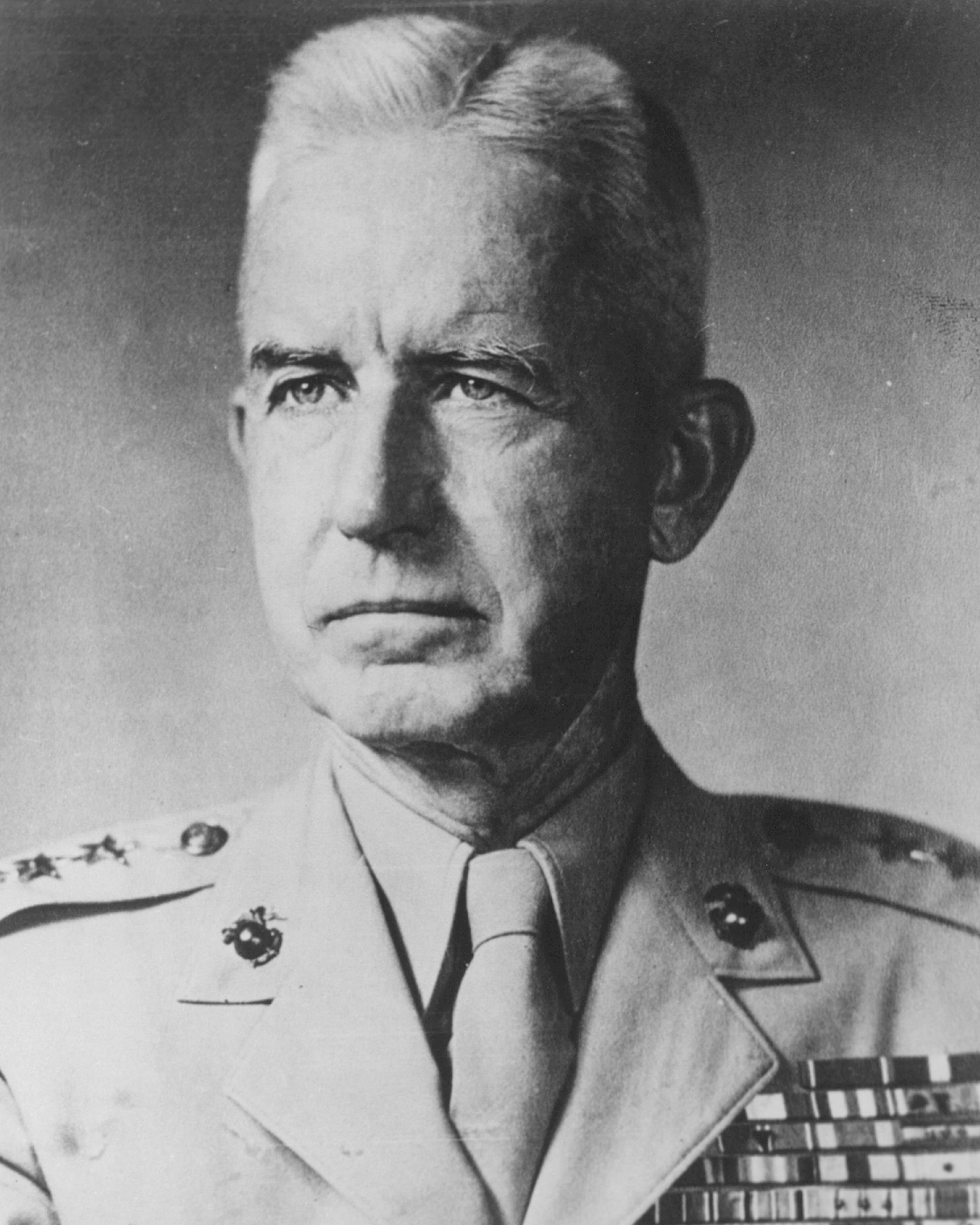
Oliver P. Smith as a major general

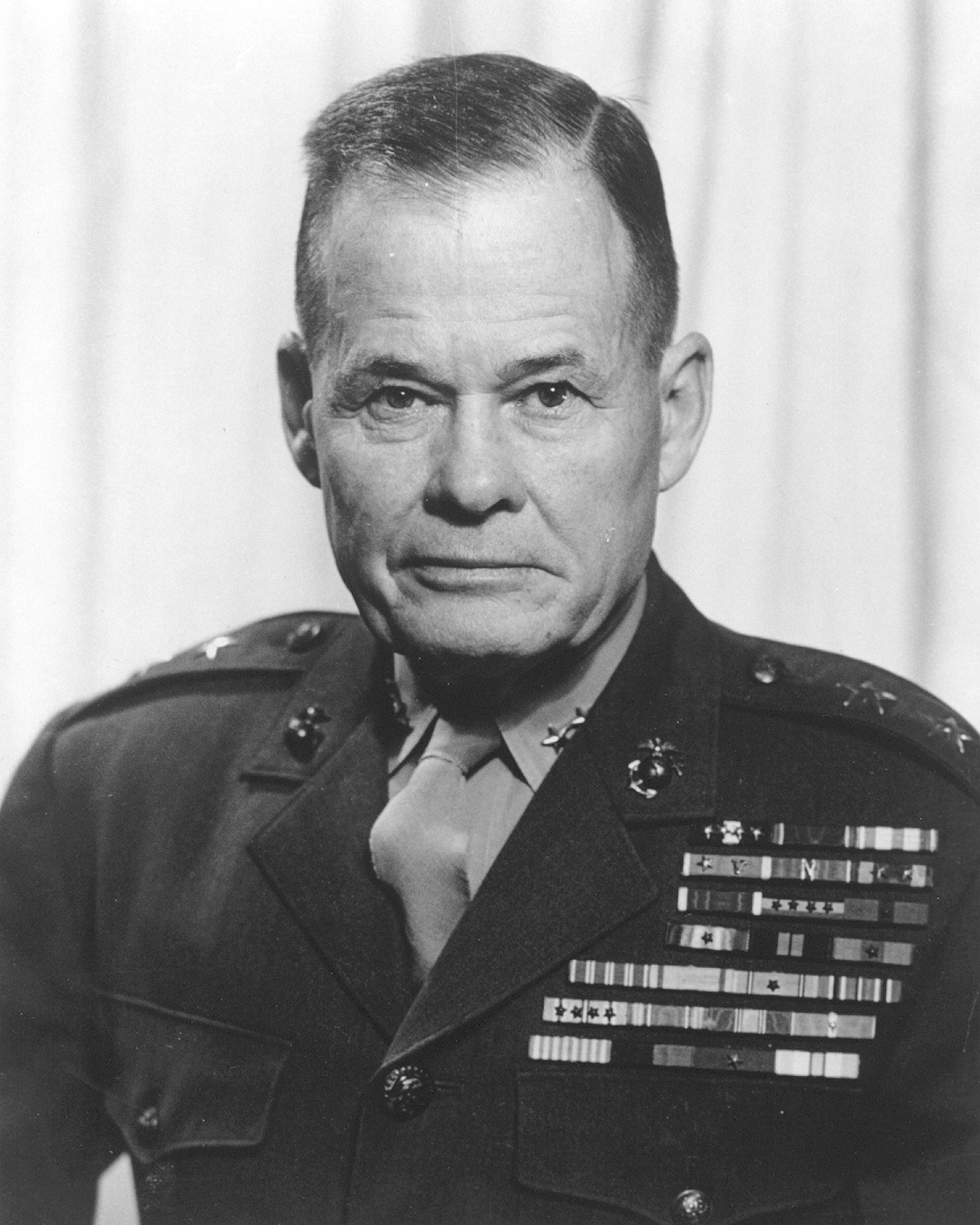
Lewis B. Puller as a major general

=== American order of battle ===
United States Pacific Fleet
Admiral Chester W. Nimitz
US Third Fleet
Admiral William F. Halsey Jr.

Joint Expeditionary Force (Task Force 31)
Vice Admiral Theodore S. Wilkinson

Expeditionary Troops (Task Force 36)
III Amphibious Corps (Note: Also included the Army's 81st Infantry Division (assigned to the capture of Angaur), the 77th Infantry Division, and the 5th Marine Division)
Major General Julian C. Smith, (Note: Because the III Amph. Corps was still struggling with the capture of Guam, Marine Corps planning for Stalemate II was assigned to Gen. Smith; operational command for the invasion was turned over to Gen. Geiger.) USMC

Western Landing Force (TG 36.1)
Major General Roy S. Geiger, USMC

1st Marine Division

- Division Commander: Maj. Gen. William H. Rupertus, (Note: Rupertus was not at peak effectiveness, having broken an ankle at Guadalcanal during landing practice for Stalemate II, but Smith learned of this too late to make a change in divisional command.) USMC
- Asst. Division Commander: Brig. Gen. Oliver P. Smith, (Note: While commanding the 1st Marine Division at the Chosin Reservoir during the Korean War, Smith announced, "Retreat, hell ... we're just advancing in a different direction.") USMC
- Chief of Staff: Col. John T. Selden, USMC

Beach assignments

- Left (White 1 & 2)
  - 1st Marine Regiment (Col. Lewis B. "Chesty" Puller, (Note: Became the most decorated Marine in the history of the Corps.) USMC)
  - Co. A of the following: 1st Engineer Battalion, 1st Pioneer Battalion, 1st Medical Battalion, 1st Tank Battalion
- Center (Orange 1 & 2)
  - 5th Marine Regiment (Col. Harold D. "Bucky" Harris, USMC)
  - Co. B of the following: 1st Engineer Battalion, 1st Pioneer Battalion, 1st Medical Battalion, 1st Tank Battalion (reduced)
- Right (Orange 3)
  - 7th Marine Regiment (Col. Herman H. "Hard-Headed" Hanneken, USMC)
  - Co. C of the following: 1st Engineer Battalion, 1st Pioneer Battalion, 1st Medical Battalion, 1st Tank Battalion (reduced)
- Other units
  - 11th Marine Regiment, Artillery (Col. William H. Harrison, USMC)
  - 12th Antiaircraft Artillery Battalion
  - 1st Amphibian Tractor Battalion
  - 3rd Armored Amphibian Tractor Battalion
  - 4th, 5th, 6th Marine War Dog Platoons
  - UDT 6 and UDT 7

=== Japanese order of battle ===
Lt. Gen. Sadae Inoue

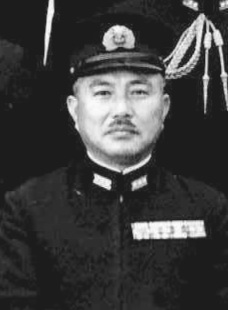
Vice Adm. Yoshioka Ito

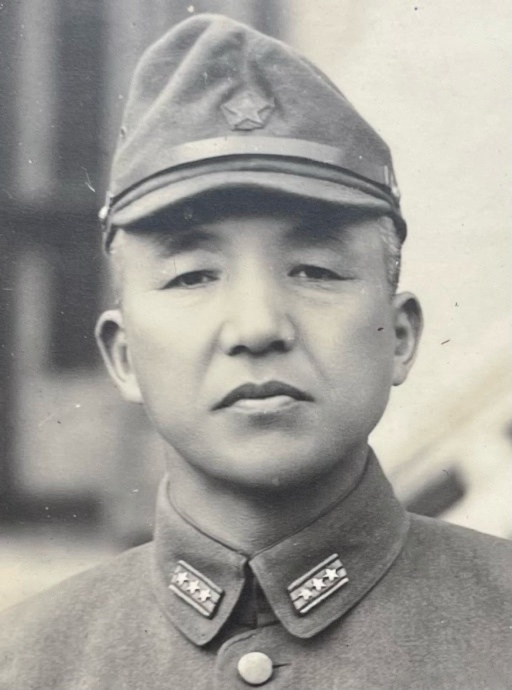
Maj. Gen. Kenjiro Murai

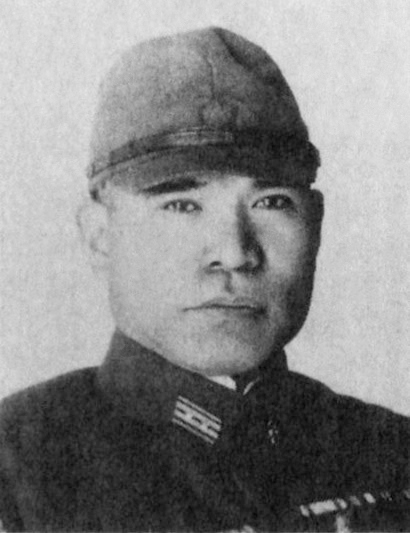
Lt. Col. Kunio Nakagawa

Palau District Group
Lieutenant General Sadae Inoue (Note: "...stern-voice and strict disciplinarian;" 1949 Sentenced to death His sentence was commuted to life imprisonment in 1951, and he was released in 1953. Inoue died in Japan in 1961..[Wikipedia]) (HQ on Koror Island)
Vice Admiral Yoshioka (Kenzo) Ito
Maj. Gen. Kenjiro Murai (Note: Sadae sent Murai to Peleliu to provide sufficiently high Army rank to balance the command authority of Vice Adm. Ito, who was nominally in charge of Navy forces in the lower Palaus.)

14th Division (Lt. Gen. Sadae)
Peleliu Sector Unit (Lt. Col. Kunio Nakagawa (Note: Committed suicide along with Murai as the struggle for the Umurbrogol Pocket neared its end.))

- 2nd Infantry Regiment, Reinforced
  - 2nd Bttn. / 2nd Infantry Regiment
  - 3rd Bttn. / 2nd Infantry Regiment
  - 3rd Bttn. / 15th Infantry Regiment
  - 346th Bttn. / 53rd Independent Mixed Brigade

== Battle ==
=== Landing ===
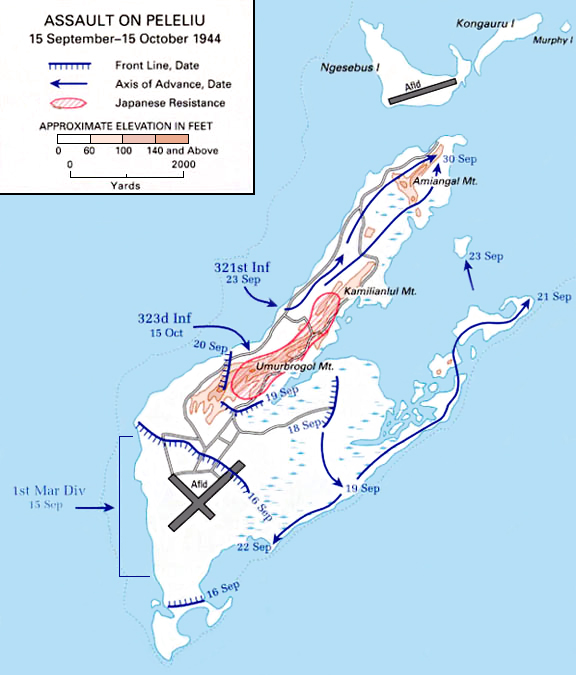
Routes of Allied landings on Peleliu, 15 September 1944

US Marines began landing on Peleliu at 08:32 on 15 September. The 1st Marines landed to the north on White Beach 1 and 2, while the 5th and 7th Marines landed to the center and south on Orange Beach 1, 2, and 3. As the additional landing craft approached the beaches, the Marines on shore were caught in a crossfire when the Japanese opened the steel doors guarding their positions and began firing artillery. The positions on the coral promontories guarding each flank fired on the Marines with 47 mm guns and 20 mm cannons. By 09:30 the Japanese had destroyed 60 LVTs and DUKWs.

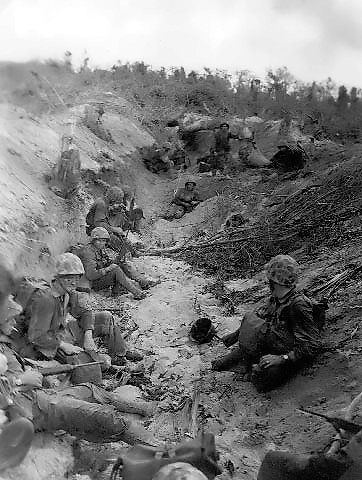
5th Marines on Orange Beach

The 1st Marines were quickly bogged down by heavy fire from the 30-foot (9 m) high coral ridge on their left flank, "The Point". Puller's LVT was hit by a dud high-velocity artillery round, and his communications section was destroyed on its way to the beach by a hit from a 47 mm round. The 7th Marines faced a cluttered Orange Beach 3, with natural and man-made obstacles forcing the LVTs to bunch together and approach in column. The 1st Marines suffered very heavy casualties on White Beach 1, and its line was opened at multiple points, and faced potential annihilation in the face of a counterattack, but a counterattack had never materialized on the beach as the Japanese had employed new tactics in which they drew the Marines inland, while the beach forces engaged in a delaying action. Commanding 3/7, Major Hunter Hurst recalled, “The enemy was groggy, disorganized and devoid of communications, although bitterly defending every step of the way. At no time did we feel him capable of organizing a successful counterattack".

After securing the beachhead, the Marines advanced abreast, but progress was very slow contrasting with the envisioned 3-day timetable due to heavy resistance. Losses on White Beach 1 were particularly severe. A tank crewman recalled "When the tide went out that night, you could have walked 300 yards across the beach on the bodies of dead Marines". Many Japanese troops on the beachhead retreated northwards at this stage towards the ridges on the center of the island, while other stragglers and isolated pockets of Japanese continued to fight behind the Marine lines.

=== Japanese counterattack ===
The 5th Marines made the most progress on the first day, aided by cover provided by coconut groves. As they approached the airfield they were met with Nakagawa's first counterattack, comprising between 11 and 17 light tanks. The Japanese troops advanced across the airfield and attempted to push the Marines back. The light tanks raced across the landing strip, firing their guns at the Marines, with Japanese infantry mounted on some of them. The counterattack was met with tank fire, heavy machine guns and air attack and was swiftly defeated, though some of the tanks reached the Marine lines. In a mistake oft-repeated by the Japanese, the counter-attack had been made inland after the allies had landed most of their heavy equipment and tanks. After the first counterattack was beaten, the Japanese made several smaller counterattacks over the course of the next few hours, supported with two tanks each.

At the end of the first day, the Americans held their 2-mile (3.2 km) stretch of landing beaches but little else. Their biggest push in the south moved 1 mile (1.6 km) inland, but the 1st Marines to the north made very little progress in the face of extremely heavy Japanese resistance. The Marines had suffered 200 dead and 900 wounded on the first day. Rupertus, still unaware of his enemy's change of tactics, believed the Japanese defenses would quickly crumble since their perimeter had been broken.

As night settled, with the Marines capturing little more than a beachhead. Japanese troops, some wearing helmets of dead American Marines, began infiltrating the Marine lines and engaging in close-quarters combat with the Marines, with three infiltrators penetrating as far as Smith's command post in the rear of the Marine lines.

=== Airfield/South Peleliu ===
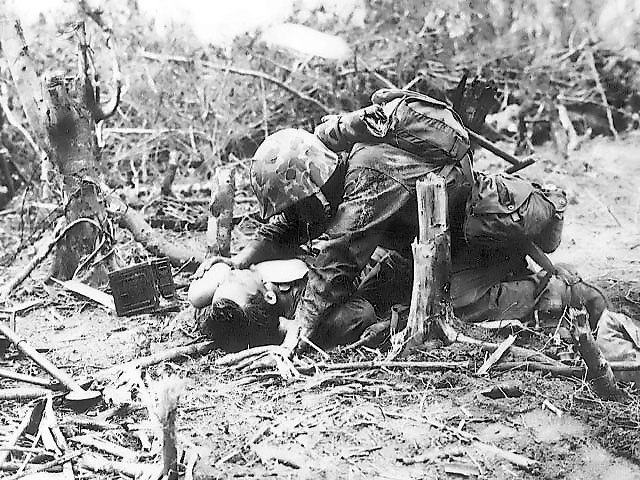
A wounded Marine receives a drink from a Navy corpsman.

On 16 September the 5th Marines moved to capture the airfield and push toward Peleliu's eastern shore. The entire regiment crossed the airfield simultaneously, enduring heavy artillery fire from the highlands to the north, and suffered heavy casualties in the process. After capturing the airfield, they rapidly advanced to the eastern end of Peleliu. The Japanese 2nd Battalion, 15th Infantry was isolated on the southern tip of the island, and it fell to the 7th Marines to destroy this pocket.

This area was hotly contested by the Japanese, who still occupied numerous pillboxes. Heat indices were around 115 °F (46 °C), and the Marines suffered high casualties from heat exhaustion. Further complicating the situation, the Marines' drinking water was distributed in empty oil drums, contaminating it with oil residue. Regardless, by 23 September the 5th and 7th Marines had accomplished their objectives, holding the airfield and the southern portion of the island, although the airfield remained under threat of sustained Japanese fire from the heights of Umurbrogol Mountain until the end of the battle.

American forces began using the airfield on 17 September. Stinson OY-1 Sentinels from VMO-3 began aerial spotting missions for Marine artillery and naval gunfire support. On 26 September Marine F4U Corsairs from VMF-114 landed on the airstrip. The Corsairs began dive-bombing missions across Peleliu, firing rockets into open cave entrances in support of infantry attacks, and dropping napalm. This was only the second time that napalm had been used in the Pacific theater, and it proved effective at burning away vegetation hiding spider holes, usually killing their occupants. The time from takeoff to the target area for the Corsairs operating from Peleliu Airfield was very short, sometimes only 10 to 15 seconds. Most pilots did not bother to raise their landing gear, leaving them down during the strike. After a strike was completed, the Corsair simply turned back into the landing pattern again.

=== The Point ===
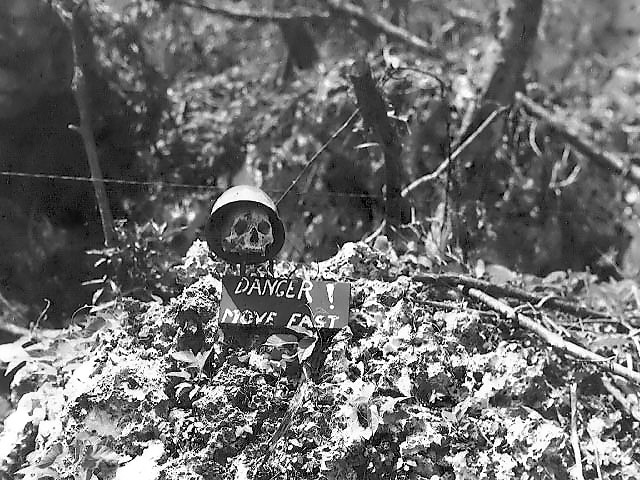
Frontline warning sign on Peleliu, October 1944

"The Point" at the end of the northern landing beaches continued to cause heavy Marine casualties from the enfilading fire of Japanese heavy machine guns and anti-tank artillery across the landing beaches. Puller ordered Captain George P. Hunt, commander of K Company, 3rd Battalion, 1st Marines, to capture the position. Hunt's company approached "The Point" short on supplies, having lost most of its machine guns while approaching the beaches. Hunt's second platoon was pinned down for nearly a day in an anti-tank trench between fortifications. The rest of his company was threatened when the Japanese cut a hole in their line, surrounding his unit and leaving his right flank cut off.

A rifle platoon then began knocking out the Japanese gun positions one by one. Using smoke grenades for concealment, the platoon swept through each hole, destroying the positions via a combination of rifle grenades and close-quarters combat. After knocking out six machine gun positions, the Marines faced a cave housing the 47 mm gun. A lieutenant blinded the gun crew with a smoke grenade, allowing Corporal Henry W. Hahn to launch a grenade through the cave's aperture. The grenade detonated the 47 mm's shells, forcing the Japanese defenders out with their bodies alight and their ammunition belts exploding around their waists. A Marine fire team was positioned on the flank of the cave, where the emerging occupants were gunned down.

K Company had captured "The Point", but Nakagawa again counterattacked. Over the next 30 hours the Japanese counterattacked four times against a single company, critically low on supplies, out of water and virtually surrounded. The Marines had to resort to hand-to-hand combat to fend off the Japanese attackers. By the time reinforcements arrived, the company had successfully repulsed all the Japanese attacks, but had been reduced to 18 men, suffering 157 casualties during the battle for The Point. Hunt and Hahn were both awarded the Navy Cross for their actions.

=== Ngesebus Island ===
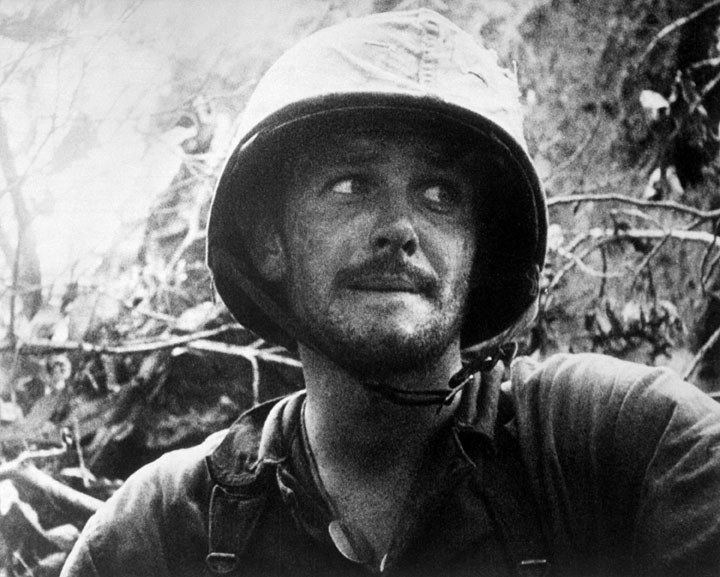
U.S. Marine in combat at Peleliu Island, September 1944

The 5th Marines—after securing the airfield—were sent to capture Ngesebus Island, just north of Peleliu. Ngesebus was occupied by multiple Japanese artillery positions and was the site of an airfield still under construction. The tiny island was connected to Peleliu by a narrow causeway, but 5th Marines commander Harris opted instead to make a shore-to-shore amphibious landing, predicting the causeway to be an obvious target for the island's defenders.

Harris coordinated a pre-landing bombardment of the island on 28 September, carried out by Army 155 mm (6.1 in) guns, naval guns, howitzers from the 11th Marines, strafing runs from VMF-114's Corsairs and 75 mm (2.95 in) fire from the approaching LVTs. Unlike the Navy's bombardment of Peleliu, Harris' assault on Ngesebus successfully killed most of the Japanese defenders. The Marines still faced opposition in the ridges and caves, but the island fell quickly, with relatively light casualties for the 5th Marines. They had suffered 15 killed and 33 wounded and inflicted 470 casualties on the Japanese.

=== Bloody Nose Ridge ===
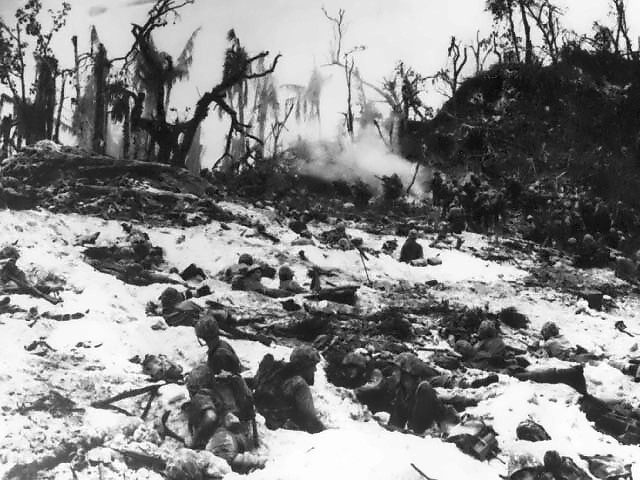
Marines waiting in their fighting holes

After capturing "The Point", the 1st Marines moved north into the Umurbrogol pocket, nicknamed "Bloody Nose Ridge" by the Marines. Puller led his men in numerous assaults, but each incurred severe casualties from Japanese fire. The 1st Marines' movement was constrained by the narrow paths between the ridges, with each ridge fortification able to support the others with direct and indirect fires.

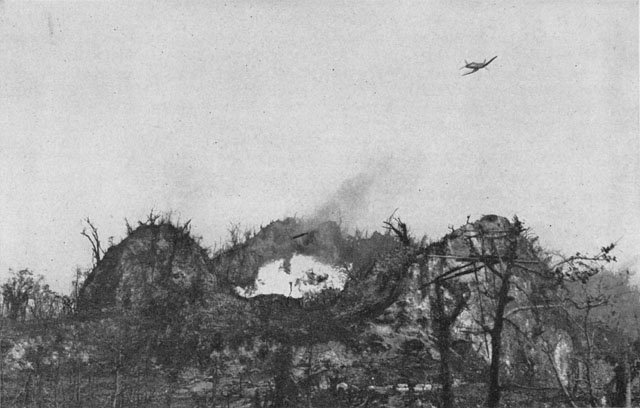
A F4U Corsair drops napalm on Japanese positions atop Umurbrogol.

The Marines took increasingly heavy casualties as they slowly advanced through the ridges. The Japanese again showed unusual fire discipline, striking only when they could inflict maximum casualties. As casualties mounted, Japanese snipers began to take aim at stretcher bearers, knowing that if stretcher bearers were injured or killed, more would have to return to replace them, providing more targets. In small groups, Japanese soldiers also frequently attempted to infiltrate the American lines at night. The Marines built two-man fighting holes, so one Marine could sleep while the other kept watch for infiltrators.

A particularly intense engagement occurred on Bloody Nose Ridge, when the 1st Battalion, 1st Marines—under the command of Major Raymond Davis—attacked Hill 100. Over six days of fighting, the battalion suffered 71% casualties. Captain Everett P. Pope and his company penetrated deep into the ridges, leading his remaining 90 men to seize what he thought was Hill 100. It took a day's fighting to reach what he thought was the crest of the hill, which was in fact another ridge occupied by more Japanese defenders.

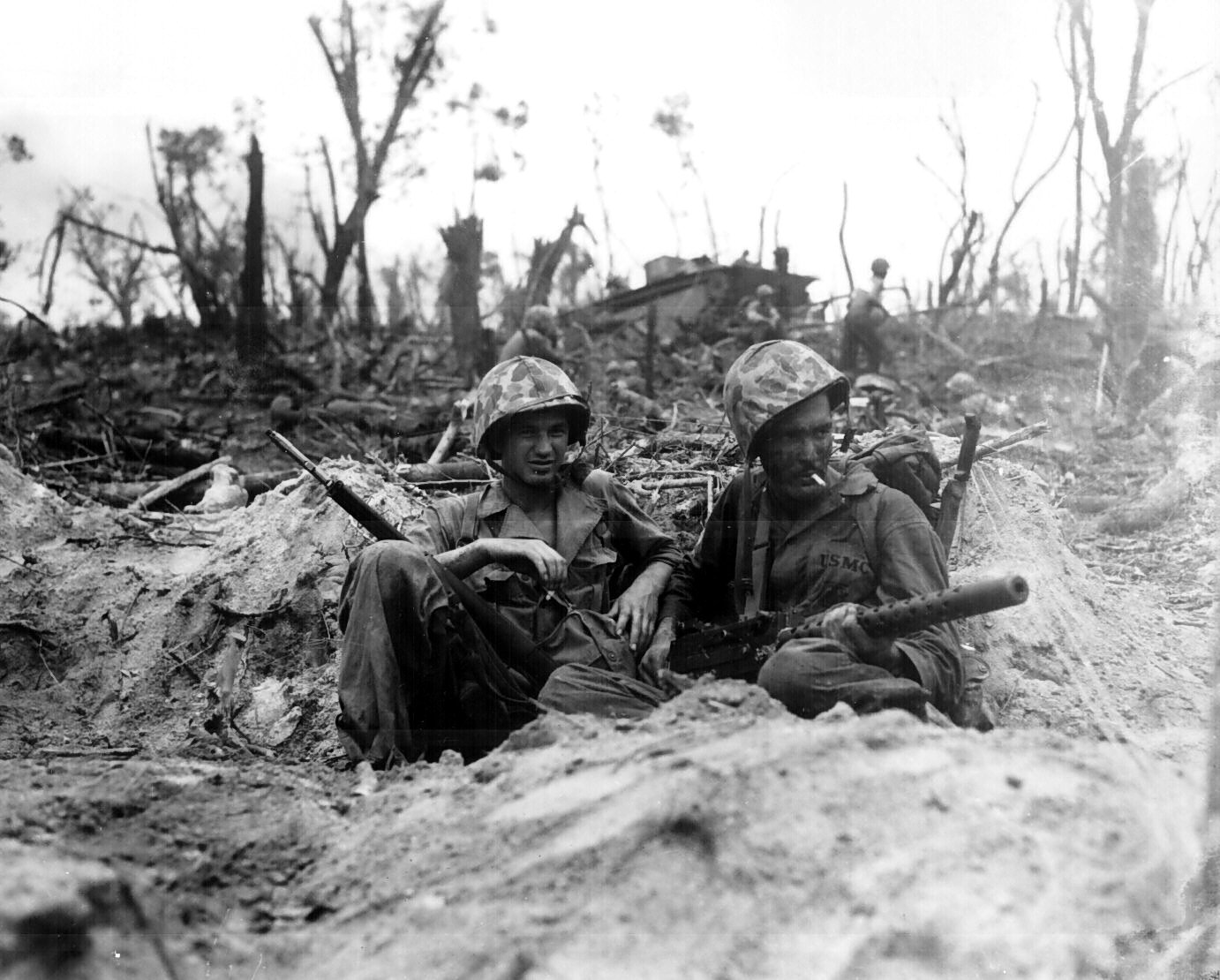
Marine Pfc. Douglas Lightheart (right) cradles his .30 caliber (7.62×63mm) M1919 Browning machine gun in his lap, while he and Pfc. Gerald Thursby Sr. take a cigarette break, during mopping up operations on Peleliu on 15 September 1944.

Trapped at the base of the ridge, Pope set up a small defensive perimeter, which was attacked relentlessly by the Japanese throughout the night. The Marines ran out of ammunition and had to fight the attackers with knives and fists, even resorting to throwing coral rock and empty ammunition boxes at the Japanese. Pope and his men managed to hold out until dawn, which brought on more deadly fire. When they evacuated the position, only nine men remained. Pope later received the Medal of Honor for the action.

The Japanese inflicted 70% casualties on Puller's 1st Marines, or 1,749 men. After six days of fighting in the ridges of the Umurbrogol, Geiger sent elements of the U.S. Army's 81st Infantry Division to Peleliu to relieve the regiment. The 321st Regiment Combat Team landed on the western beaches of Peleliu—at the northern end of Umurbrogol mountain—on 23 September. The warren of ridges still occupied by Japanese troops became colloquially known as "the Pocket" by American forces on Peleliu. The 321st and the 7th Marines had fully encircled this "Pocket" by 24 September, D+9.

By 15 October the 7th Marines had suffered 46% casualties, and Geiger relieved them with the 5th Marines. Col. Harris adopted siege tactics, using bulldozers and flamethrower tanks to methodically destroy Japanese positions, and pushed into the ridges from the north. On 30 October the 81st Infantry Division took over command of Peleliu. It would take another six weeks, using the same tactics as the Marines, to finally reduce "The Pocket".

After emerging victorious in the Battle of Angaur, the 81st Infantry Division was ordered to assist the 1st Marine Division in their efforts to seize Peleliu. The 81st Infantry Division eventually relieved the 1st Marine Division, and assumed command of combat operations on Peleliu. The 81st Infantry Division remained engaged on the island until the end of organized Japanese resistance on 18 January 1945.

On 24 November Nakagawa sent his final message to his superiors; "Our sword is broken and we have run out of spears", and that he had split his remaining 56 men into 17 groups and ordered them to "attack the enemy everywhere". He then burnt his regimental colors and, along with Major General Murai, performed ritual suicide. He was posthumously promoted to lieutenant general for his concerted defensive campaign on Peleliu. On 27 November the island was declared secure, ending the 73-day-long battle.

A Japanese lieutenant with twenty-six 2nd Infantry soldiers and eight 45th Guard Force sailors held out in the caves on Peleliu until 22 April 1947, only surrendering after a former Japanese admiral convinced them the war was over.

== Aftermath ==
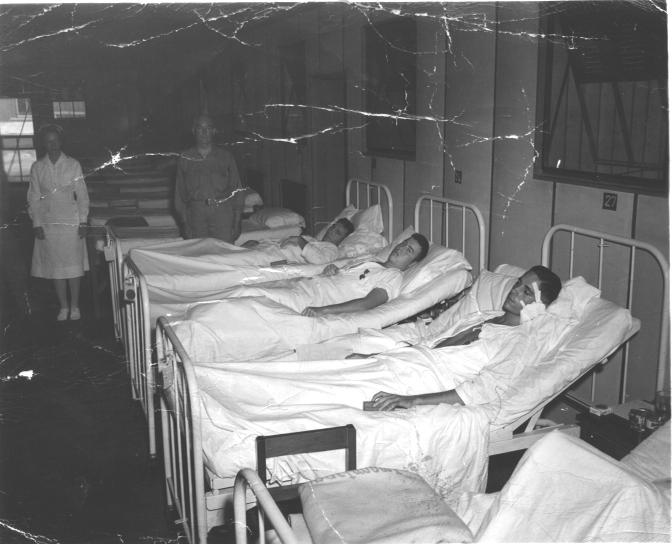
Marines in a hospital on Guadalcanal after being wounded in the Battle of Peleliu

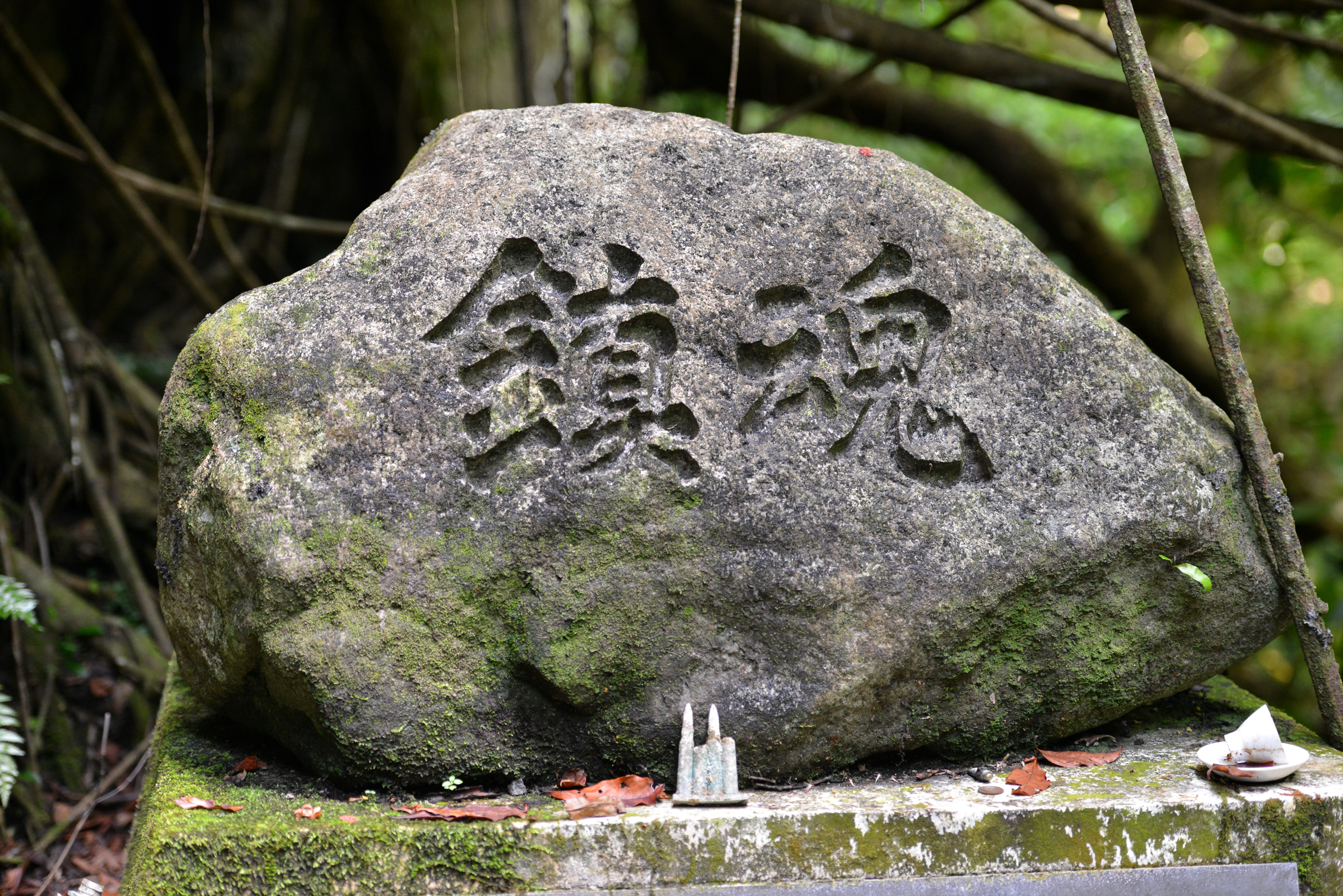
Japanese memorial, with inscription 鎮魂 (chinkon, "consolation and pacification of the souls of the dead").

The reduction of the Japanese positions in "The Pocket" around Umurbrogol mountain has been called the most difficult fight that the U.S. military encountered during the entire war. The 1st Marine Division was severely mauled, and remained out of action until the invasion of Okinawa on 1 April 1945. In total, the 1st Marine Division suffered over 6,500 casualties during a month of combat on Peleliu, over one third of the entire division. The 81st Infantry Division also suffered heavy losses, incurring 3,300 casualties during its tenure on the island.

Postwar statisticians calculated that it took U.S. forces over 1,500 rounds of ammunition to kill each individual Japanese defender, and that the Americans expended 13.32 million rounds of .30-calibre, 1.52 million rounds of .45-calibre, 693,657 rounds of .50-calibre bullets, 118,262 hand grenades, and 150,000 mortar rounds over the course of the battle.

The battle was controversial in the United States. Many felt that too many American lives had been lost for an island that had little strategic value. The Japanese defenders lacked the means to interfere with potential US operations in the Philippines and the airfield captured on Peleliu did not play a key role in any subsequent operations. Instead, Ulithi Atoll in the Caroline Islands was used as a staging base for the invasion of Okinawa. The casualty rate exceeded all other amphibious operations during the Pacific War.

In addition, few news reports were published about the battle because Rupertus's prediction of a "three days" victory motivated only six war reporters to report from shore. The battle was also overshadowed by MacArthur's return to the Philippines and the Allies' push towards Germany in Europe.

The battles for Angaur and Peleliu offered the Americans a preview of future Japanese island defense, but American planners made few adjustments to their tactics before the battles of Iwo Jima and Okinawa. Naval bombardment prior to amphibious assault at Iwo Jima was only slightly more effective than at Peleliu, but at Okinawa the preliminary shelling was greatly improved. Frogmen performing underwater demolition at Iwo Jima confused the enemy by sweeping both coasts, but later alerted Japanese defenders to the exact assault beaches at Okinawa. American ground forces at Peleliu gained experience in assaulting heavily fortified positions, which they would encounter again on Iwo Jima and Okinawa.

At the recommendation of Admiral William Halsey Jr., the planned occupation of Yap Island in the Caroline Islands was canceled. Halsey actually recommended that the landings on Peleliu and Angaur be canceled, too, and their Marines and soldiers be sent to Leyte Island instead, but this plan was overruled by Nimitz.

In his book With the Old Breed, Eugene Sledge describes his experiences in the Battle for Peleliu. One of the final scenes in Parer's War, a 2014 Australian television film, shows the Battle of Peleliu recorded by Damien Parer with his camera at the time of his death.

== Individual honors ==
=== Japan ===
==== Posthumous promotions ====
For heroism:

- Colonel Kunio Nakagawa – lieutenant general
- Major General Kenjiro Murai – lieutenant general

=== United States ===
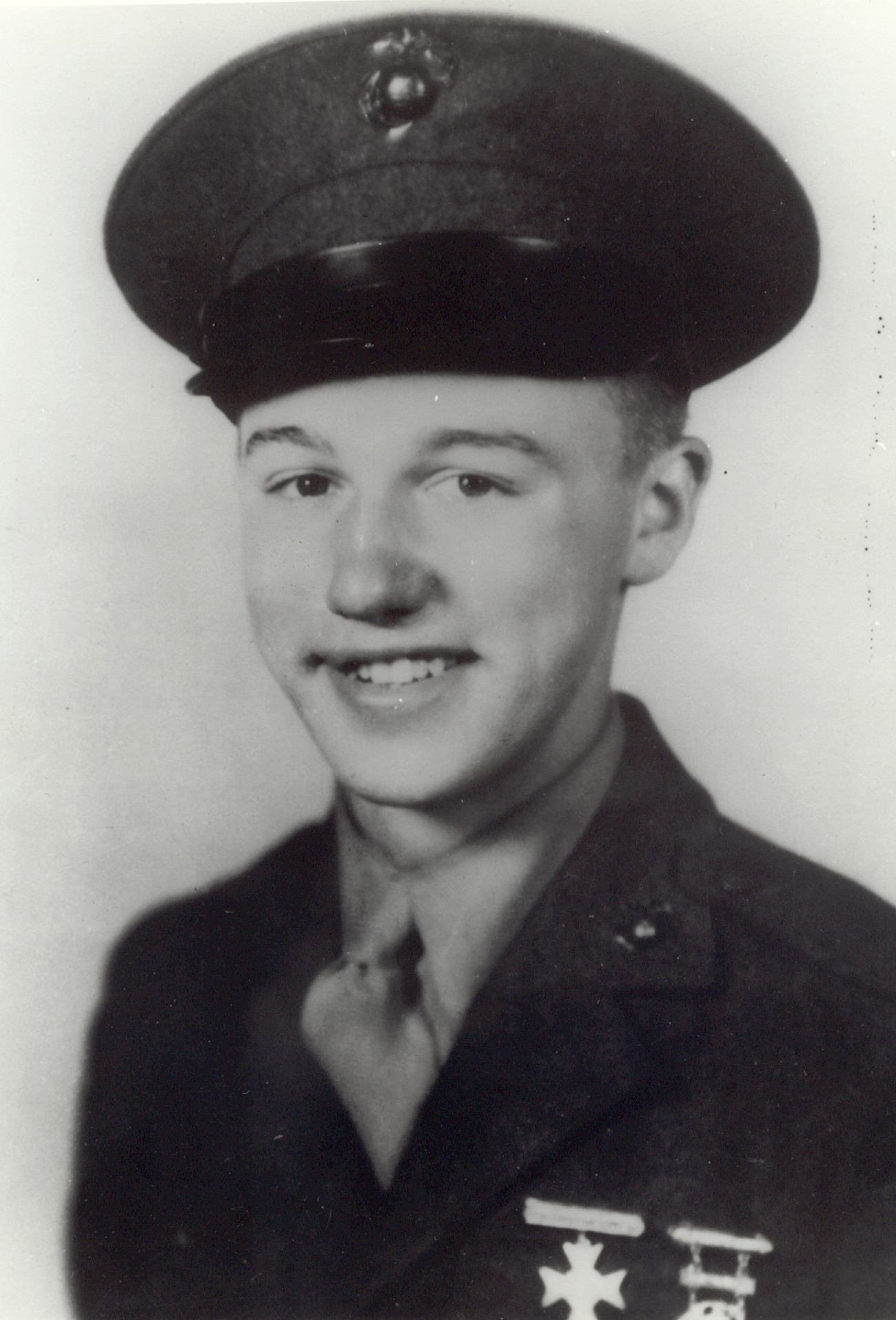
Pfc. Richard Kraus, USMC (age 18), killed in action

==== Medal of Honor recipients ====
- Captain Everett P. Pope – 1st Battalion, 1st Marines
- First Lieutenant Carlton R. Rouh – 1st Battalion, 5th Marines
- Corporal Lewis K. Bausell –1st Battalion, 5th Marines (Posthumous)
- Private First Class Arthur J. Jackson – 3rd Battalion, 7th Marines
- Private First Class Richard E. Kraus – 8th Amphibian Tractor Battalion, 1st Marine Division (Reinforced) (Posthumous)
- Private First Class John D. New – 2nd Battalion, 7th Marines (Posthumous)
- Private First Class Wesley Phelps – 3rd Battalion, 7th Marines (Posthumous)
- Private First Class Charles H. Roan – 2nd Battalion, 7th Marines (Posthumous)

== Unit citations ==
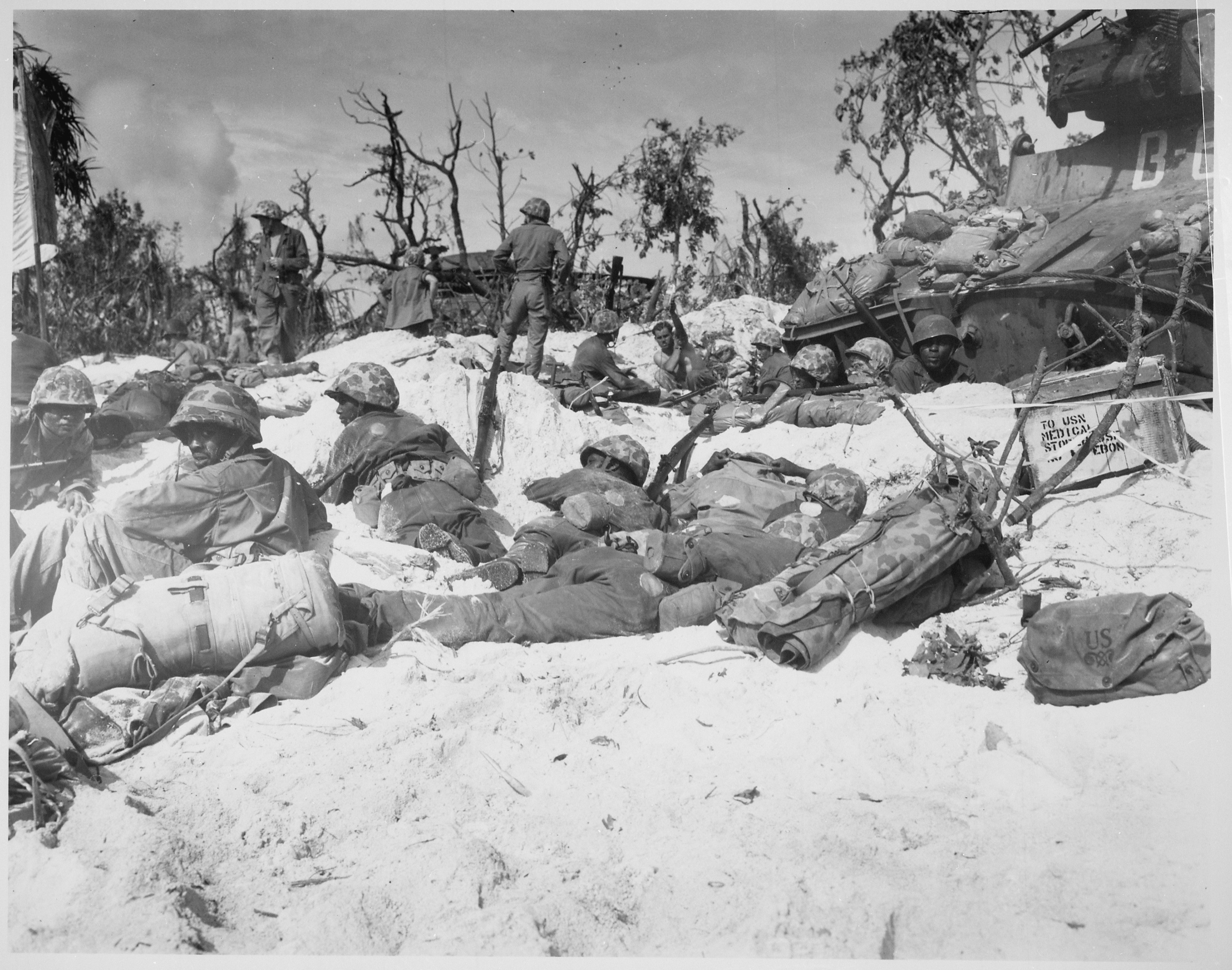
D-day Peleliu, African Americans of one of the two segregated units that supported the 7th Marines – the 16th Marine Field Depot or the 17th Naval Construction Battalion Special take a break in the 115 degree (46 Celsius) heat, 09-15-1944 – NARA – 532535

- Presidential Unit Citation:
  - 1st Marine Division, 15–29 September 1944
  - 1st Amphibian Tractor Battalion, FMF
  - U. S. Navy Flame Thrower Unit Attached
  - 6th Amphibian Tractor Battalion (Provisional), FMF
  - 3d Armored Amphibian Battalion (Provisional), FMF
  - Detachment Eighth Amphibian Tractor Battalion, FMF
  - 454th Amphibian Truck Company, U. S. Army
  - 456th Amphibian Truck Company, U. S. Army
  - 4th Joint Assault Signal Company, FMF
  - 5th Separate Wire Platoon, FMF
  - 6th Separate Wire Platoon, FMF
  - Detachment 33rd Naval Construction Battalion (202 Personnel)
  - Detachment 73rd Naval Construction Battalion's Shore Party (241 Personnel)
- USMC Commendatory Letter: (Note: Before the battle was even over, Major General Rupertus USMC wrote: "THE NEGRO RACE CAN WELL BE PROUD OF THE WORK PREFORMED [by the 11th Marine Depot Company/ 7th Marine Ammunition Company/ 17th CB]. THE WHOLEHEARTED CO-OPERATION AND UNTIRING EFFORTS WHICH DEMONSTRATED IN EVERY RESPECT THAT THEY APPRECIATED THE PRIVILEGE OF WEARING A MARINE UNIFORM AND SERVING WITH THE MARINES IN COMBAT. PLEASE CONVEY TO YOUR COMMAND THESE SENTIMENTS AND INFORM THEM THAT IN THE EYES OF THE ENTIRE DIVISION THEY HAVE EARNED A "WELL DONE"." The Department of the Navy made an official news release of the 17th CBs "Well Done" letter on November 28, 1944.: On D-day the 7th Marines had a situation. They did not have enough men to man the line and get the wounded to safety. Three men were sent to find help and found two segregated units, the 16th Marine Field Depot (11th Marine Depot Co. & 7th Marine Ammunition Co.) and 17th Special CB. The Marines were not certain what their officers would think of them bringing African Americans but, they knew they needed help. The 17th Special Seabees were assigned to the 1st Pioneers as shore party. Together with the 16th Depot Marines they helped with the wounded that day. At 0200 that night the Japanese mounted a counterattack. By the time it was over nearly the entire 17th had volunteered to hump ammo to the line on the stretchers they were bringing the wounded back on, fill in where the wounded had been, man 37mm guns that had lost their crews, and volunteer for anything. The record for the 16th Depot says they were carrying ammo and wounded back the same as the Seabees and had picked up rifles and become infantry where needed also. The 17th Seabees remained with the 7th through D-plus 3. Before the battle was over and the island secured Maj. General Rupertus wrote three letters saying "Well Done" to the two Marine Companies and the CB . According to the Military History Encyclopedia on the Web, were it not for the "Black Marine shore party personal" the counterattack on the 7th Marines would not have been repulsed.)
  - 11th Marine Depot Company (segregated)
  - 7th Marine Ammunition Company (segregated)
  - 17th Special Naval Construction Battalion (segregated)

== See also ==
- With the Old Breed contains an eyewitness account of the battle by Eugene B. Sledge
- U.S. National Register of Historic Places (The Peleliu Battlefield, listed 1985)
- USS Peleliu, an amphibious assault ship named in memory of the battle
- Helmet for My Pillow, a memoir of the battle written by Robert Leckie
- Peleliu: Guernica of Paradise, a Japanese manga and anime film set during the battle.
- The Pacific, HBO series depicts the Battle of Peleliu
- Peleliu Naval Base
- Naval Base Kossol Roads
- Thousand-yard stare
