= Harold D. Harris =

United States Marine Corps general

Harold Douglas Harris
- Born: February 4, 1903; Laramie, Wyoming
- Died: September 20, 1984 (aged 81); Lakeland, Florida
- Military career
- Allegiance: United States
- Branch: United States Marine Corps
- Service years: 1925–1950
- Rank: Brigadier general
- Nickname: "Bucky"
- Service number: 0-3969
- Commands: 5th Marine Regiment
- Conflicts: Nicaraguan Campaign; World War II: Guadalcanal Campaign; Solomon Islands Campaign; New Britain campaign; Battle of Cape Gloucester; Battle of Peleliu
- Awards: Legion of Merit; Bronze Star Medal; Purple Heart

Harold Douglas Harris (February 4, 1903 – September 20, 1984) was a United States Marine Corps officer with the rank of brigadier general. Harris fought guerrillas in Nicaragua, and subsequently the Japanese in World War II, while commanding 5th Marine Regiment.

== Early service ==
Harris was born on February 4, 1903, in Laramie, Wyoming. He was appointed to the United States Naval Academy in Annapolis, Maryland, and graduated with a Bachelor of Science degree in June 1925. He was commissioned a second lieutenant in the Marine Corps during that time and assigned to Marine Corps Rifle Range in Winthrop, Maryland. Harris was subsequently assigned to the Marine Corps Basic School in Philadelphia, where he was educated in warfighting skills required of a rifle platoon commander.

After his graduation in 1926, Harris sailed for Nicaragua, where he was wounded in action with Sandinista bandits on 19 February 1929. He later served foreign shore duty in Tianjin, China. Harris also attended Infantry School at Fort Benning, Georgia, and graduated in 1935.

== World War II ==
In 1938, Harris was sent to France, where he attended Ecole Superieure de Guerre in Paris. With the outbreak of World War II, Harris participated in the evacuation of US citizens from that country. For his part in the evacuation, Harris later received a Letter of Commendation by William C. Bullitt, United States Ambassador to France.

After his return to United States, Harris was assigned to Headquarters Marine Corps in Washington, D.C., where he served as assistant to the officer in charge of the Marine Corps Intelligence Section in the Division of Plans and Policies. He participated with Colonel Pedro del Valle in the study of division structures and made recommendations basic to later USMC, including triangular model (3 regiments, 3 battalions, 3 companies, 3 platoons, etc.) focus on logistics and artillery and tank transport (landing craft), and formation as an offensive organization.

He remained in this capacity until July 1942, when he was transferred as intelligence officer to the staff of Commander Amphibious Force, South Pacific under Rear Admiral Richmond K. Turner. Harris served in this capacity during the Guadalcanal Campaign. At the beginning of 1943, he was appointed chief of staff, Marine Forces (Less Aviation) Solomons.

In June 1943, Harris was assigned as executive officer of 1st Marine Regiment and served in this capacity during the New Britain campaign. For his service in this capacity, Harris was decorated with the Bronze Star Medal with Combat "V". In February 1944, now Lieutenant Colonel Harris, was appointed intelligence officer and assistant chief of staff, 1st Marine Division and served under command of Major General William H. Rupertus during the Battle of Cape Gloucester. Harris was appointed commanding officer of the 5th Marine Regiment on September 15 and led this unit during the Battle of Peleliu Commanding at Pelelieu, he is known for the phrase "be lavish with ordnance and stingy with men's lives" after aerial reconnaissance convinced him siege tactics would be required, using artillery and napalm or 'blowtorch and corkscrew' instead of frontal assault. He was relieved of Command on October 20 and transferred back to the United States. For his service at Pelelieu, Harris was decorated with the Legion of Merit with Combat "V".

== Postwar career ==
After his return to America, Harris was appointed instructor at the Army and Navy Staff College in Washington, D.C., and served in this capacity until March 1946. For his service in this capacity, Harris later received the Army Commendation Medal. He was subsequently appointed assistant to U.S. Naval Representative on the Military Staff Committee of the Security Council, United Nations.

He subsequently served as Marine officer on the staff of the commander of the Naval Forces, Mediterranean with headquarters in London, England. He returned from Europe in October 1949 and was assigned to the Headquarters Marine Corps in Washington, D.C., awaiting retirement. Harris was also decorated with the Order of Ouissam Alaouite, Degree of Commander, by the Government of Morocco in January 1950. He finally retired from the Marine Corps on January 1, 1950, and was advanced to the rank of brigadier general on the retired list for having been specially commended in combat on the same date.

Harris resided in Lakeland, Florida, after his retirement and died there on September 20, 1984. He is buried at Oak Hill Cemetery in Bartow, Florida.

== Decorations and awards ==
Harris's military ribbon bar:

1st Row	Legion of Merit with Combat "V"			
2nd Row	Bronze Star Medal with Combat "V"	Army Commendation Medal	Purple Heart	Navy Presidential Unit Citation with one star
3rd Row	Navy Unit Commendation	Marine Corps Expeditionary Medal	Second Nicaraguan Campaign Medal	American Defense Service Medal with Foreign Service Clasp
4th Row	American Campaign Medal	Asiatic-Pacific Campaign Medal with four service stars	World War II Victory Medal	Order of Ouissam Alaouite, Degree of Commander (Morocco)
