= Kunio Nakagawa =

Japanese general (1898–1944)

- 中川 州男
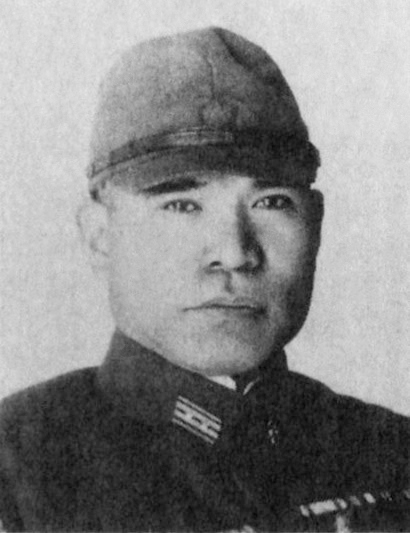
- Lt. Colonel Nakagawa (1939-43)
- Born: 23 January 1898; Kumamoto Prefecture, Empire of Japan
- Died: 24 November 1944 (aged 46); Peleliu island, Palau
- Military career
- Allegiance: Japan
- Branch: Imperial Japanese Army
- Service years: 1918–1944
- Rank: Lieutenant general (posthumous)
- Conflicts: Second Sino-Japanese War; Marco Polo Bridge Incident; World War II; Battle of Peleliu ‡‡

Kunio Nakagawa (中川 州男, Nakagawa Kunio; 23 January 1898 – 24 November 1944) was the commander of Japanese forces which defended the island of Peleliu in the Battle of Peleliu which took place from the 15th of September to the 27th of November,1944. He inflicted heavy losses on attacking U.S. Marines and held Peleliu Island for almost three months. On the evening of the 24th of November, after the battle was lost, he performed seppuku (ritual suicide) in the tradition of Japanese samurai warriors. He was posthumously promoted to lieutenant general.

== Early life and education ==
Nakagawa was a native of Kumamoto Prefecture, and was the third son of an elementary school principal. He graduated from the 30th class of the Imperial Japanese Army Academy in December 1918 and was commissioned as a second lieutenant in the infantry of the IJA 48th Regiment.

== Career ==
He subsequently served with the 2nd Regiment of the Taiwan Army of Japan, with the HQ of the IJA 12th Division, and as a battalion commander with the IJA 79th Infantry Regiment. He experienced combat for the first time during the Marco Polo Bridge Incident, and subsequently served with distinction during the Second Sino-Japanese War in Shanxi Province. In March 1939, he was sent to the Army Staff College at the recommendation of his regimental commander, and was promoted to lieutenant colonel in March 1939. In April 1941, he was awarded the prestigious Order of the Golden Kite, 4th class. In March 1943, Nakagawa was promoted to colonel and was made commander of the IJA 2nd Infantry Regiment, which was under the command of the IJA 14th Division in Manchukuo.

As the situation in the Pacific War increasingly deteriorated for Japan, the 14th Division was redeployed to bolster the defenses of the Japanese territory of Palau, and the IJA 2nd Infantry Regiment was assigned to the small island of Peleliu south of the main islands in the archipelago. When he left Japan, Nakagawa told his wife that he would not be coming back. Nakagawa made use of the natural geography of the island to construct numerous fortifications connected by a tunnel system, in order to defend the island in depth, and to inflict the most possible casualties on the invading forces. On 15 September 1944, US forces landed on Peleliu and the battle lasted over two months. In the United States, it was a controversial battle because of the island's questionable strategic value and the high casualty rate, which was the highest for U.S. military personnel of any battle in the Pacific War. The National Museum of the Marine Corps called it "the bitterest battle of the war for the Marines".

== Death ==
On 24 November, Nakagawa proclaimed "Our sword is broken and we have run out of spears". He then burnt his regimental colors and performed ritual suicide. He was posthumously promoted to lieutenant general for his valor displayed on Peleliu.

Nakagawa's remains were discovered in 1993.
