= USS New Jersey =

USS New Jersey may refer to one of the following ships of the United States Navy named after the U.S. state of New Jersey:

- USS New Jersey (BB-16), a battleship commissioned in 1906, decommissioned in 1920, and sunk in 1923 in bombing tests
- USS New Jersey (BB-62), a battleship commissioned in 1943, seeing service in World War II, Korean War, and Vietnam War; currently a museum ship in Camden, New Jersey
- USS New Jersey (SSN-796), is a Virginia-class submarine commissioned in 2024
