= 1st Combat Engineer Battalion =

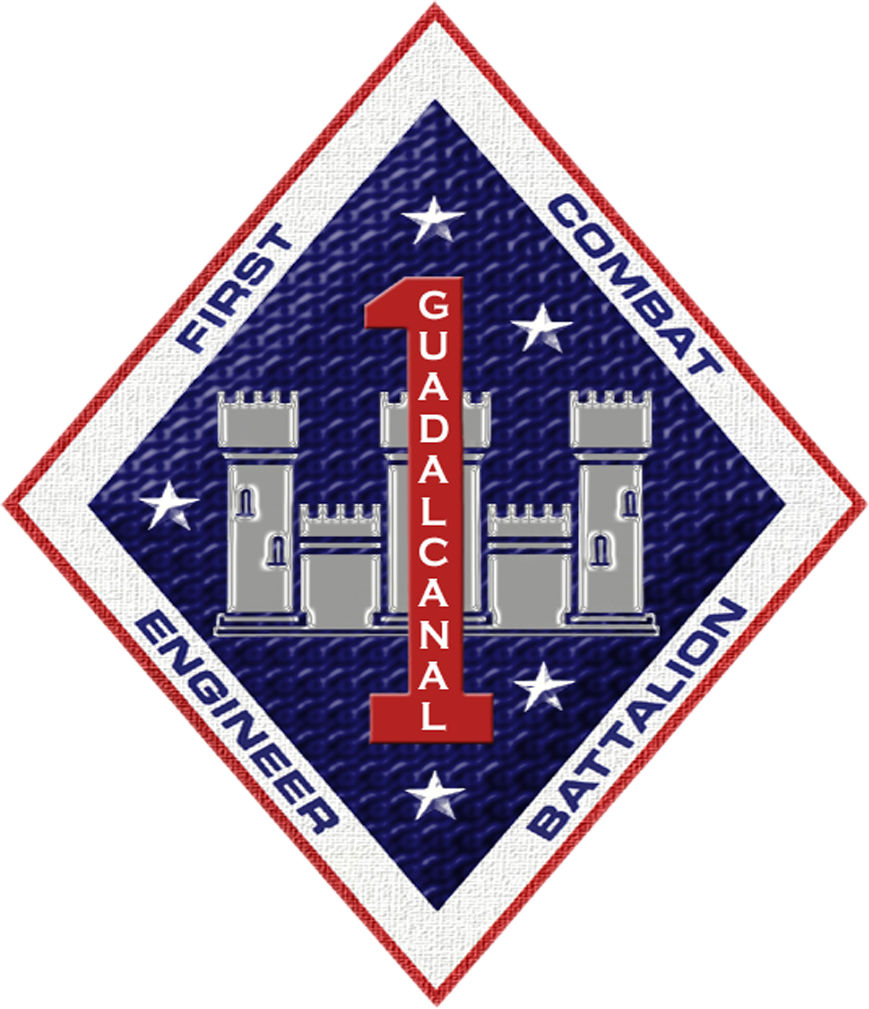
- 1st CEB insignia
- Active: 24 February 1941 – present
- Country: United States of America
- Branch: United States Marine Corps
- Type: Combat Engineering
- Size: 1400
- Part of: 1st Marine Division; I Marine Expeditionary Force
- Garrison/HQ: Marine Corps Base Camp Pendleton
- Nickname: The Super Breed
- Engagements: World War II; Battle of Guadalcanal; Battle of New Britain; Battle of Peleliu; Battle of Okinawa; Korean War; Vietnam War; Operation Desert Storm; Operation Restore Hope; War on terror; Operation Iraqi Freedom; War in Afghanistan; Operation Inherent Resolve

Commanders
- Current commander: LtCol Kyle P. McCarley

1st Combat Engineer Battalion is a combat engineer battalion of the United States Marine Corps. The unit, nicknamed "The Super Breed", is based at Marine Corps Base Camp Pendleton, California and falls under the command of the 1st Marine Division and the I Marine Expeditionary Force.

== Mission ==
Provide mobility, counter mobility, survivability, and limited general engineering support to the 1st Marine Division.

== Current units ==
- Headquarters and Service Company
- Company A (rein)
- Company B (rein)
- Company C (rein)
- Company D (rein)
- Engineer Support Company

== History ==
=== World War II ===
The battalion was formed on 24 February 1941 at Guantanamo Bay, Cuba, as the 1st Pioneer Battalion, 1st Marine Division to be a specialized unit to conduct shore party operations during amphibious assaults, and to provide close combat engineer support to the Marine infantry. The average age of the enlisted men was about 18, and they referred to themselves as "draft dodgers" because all were volunteers. They relocated during April 1941 to Marine Corps Recruit Depot Parris Island, South Carolina and again in September 1941 to "Tent City One" at Marine Corps Air Station New River, North Carolina

During World War II, the Pioneer Battalion consisted of a headquarters and three pioneer companies with each pioneer company consisting of a headquarters and three pioneer platoons. The Pioneer Battalion together with an Engineer Battalion and a Seabee Battalion comprised the 17th Marines, the Division's Engineer Regiment.

On 14 June 1942 the battalion traveled by a five-day train journey to San Francisco, with the final destination of Wellington, New Zealand which was not disclosed to personnel at the time. The sail to New Zealand was on the USAT John Ericsson (NY-307), a former Swedish deluxe cruise liner the S.S. Kungsholms, departing from the Oakland Naval Base. They were redesignated on 12 January 1943 as the 1st Battalion, 17th Marines and again on 30 June 1944 as the First Engineer Battalion

The battalion participated in combat during the Battle of Guadalcanal, Eastern New Guinea, Battle of New Britain, Battle of Peleliu and the Battle of Okinawa. Following the war they were sent to Tientsin, China in September 1945 as peacekeepers and returned to the United States during June 1947 to Camp Pendleton, California

=== Korean War ===
The battalion deployed during August 1950 to Kobe, Japan, joining the 1st Provisional Marine Brigade they were then sent in September 1950 to Inchon, Korea, and joined the 1st Marine Division.

During the war they participated in the following battles:

- Battle of Pusan Perimeter
- Battle of Inchon-Seoul
- Battle of Chosin Reservoir
- East-Central Front
- Western Front

Following the armistice the battalion participated in the defense of the Korean Demilitarized Zone from August 1953 – April 1955. They returned to Camp Pendleton, California in April 1955 and were again redesignated on 1 May 1957 as the 1st Pioneer Battalion.

=== Vietnam War ===
The battalion was again redesignated on 1 May 1963 as the 1st Engineer Battalion and departed San Diego Harbor with the 7th Marine Regiment (RLT-7) on WW-II Troop Ships USS Pickaway (APA-222) and USS Renville (APA-227) on 23 May 1965 for Camp Hansen, Okinawa, with a brief stop-over at Pearl Harbor Hawaii. From Okinawa they deployed to Qui-Nhon SVN, landing there on 06-7 July 1965. On 10 November 1965 7th Marines re-deployed to Chu Lai in the Republic of Vietnam. One Marine was lost on the USS Renville while en route to Hawaii due to appendicitis which was misdiagnosed as sea-sickness.

During the Vietnam War the 1st Engineer Battalion supported 1st, 2nd, and 3rd Battalions of the 1st 5th and 7th Marines in combat operations from July 1965 through April 1971, operating from Qui-Nhon, Chu-Lai and Da-Nang, the most famous of which was Operation "Starlight" conducted August 1965 where Sgt. Robert E. O'Malley was awarded the first Marine Corps Medal of Honor of the Vietnam War.

=== 1980s and 1990s ===
The battalion participated in Operations Desert Shield and Desert Storm in Southwest Asia from August 1990 until March 1991. In May 1992, the unit was brought out to conduct riot control operations in the city and county of Los Angeles during the 1992 Los Angeles riots. They would later take part in Operation Restore Hope in Somalia from December 1992 – February 1993. Elements would participate in Fire-Fighting efforts in the Western United States during August and September 1994.

=== Global war on terror ===
The battalion has participated in Operation Iraqi Freedom from March 2003 until the present. The battalion headquarters and 3 engineer companies were deployed to Afghanistan in 2009 as part of the NATO counterinsurgency offensive in the Helmand Province, to Musa Qal’eh in 2010, and returned again, 2011 and 2013 .

== Unit awards ==
A unit citation or commendation is an award bestowed upon an organization for the action cited. Members of the unit who participated in said actions are allowed to wear on their uniforms the awarded unit citation. 1st CEB has been presented with the following awards:

Ribbon	Unit Award
	Presidential Unit Citation one Silver and two Bronze Stars
	Joint Meritorious Unit Award
	Navy Unit Commendation with one Bronze Star
	Meritorious Unit Commendation with one Bronze Stars
	American Defense Service Medal
	Asiatic-Pacific Campaign Medal with four Bronze Stars
	World War II Victory Medal
	Navy Occupation Service Medal with Asia clasp
	National Defense Service Medal with two Bronze Stars
	China Service Medal
	Korean Service Medal with two Bronze Stars
	Armed Forces Expeditionary Medal
	Vietnam Service Medal with two Bronze Stars
	Southwest Asia Service Medal with two Bronze Stars
	Korean Presidential unit Citation
	Vietnam Cross of Gallantry with Palm Streamer
	Vietnam Meritorious Unit Citation Civil Action Medal
	Iraq Campaign Medal
	Global War on Terrorism Expeditionary Medal
	Global War on Terrorism Service Medal

== See also ==
- List of United States Marine Corps battalions
- Organization of the United States Marine Corps
