= 1st Medical Battalion =

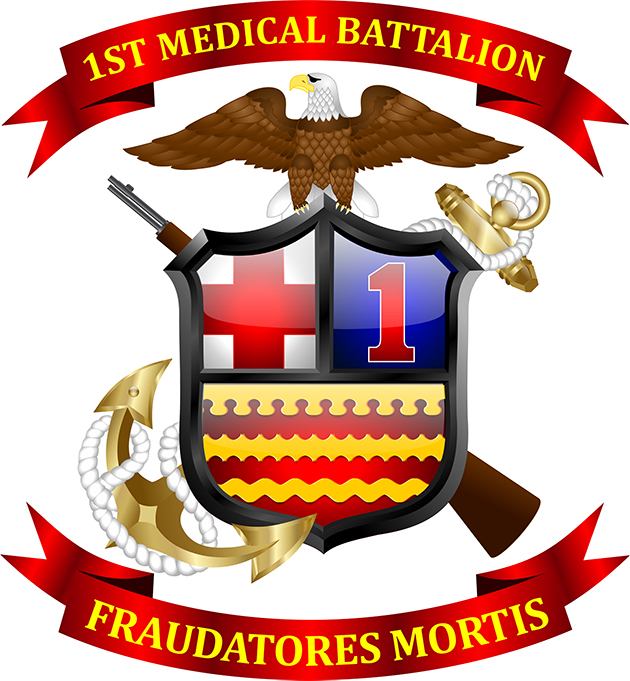
- 1st Medical Battalion emblem
- Active: September 6, 1940 - present
- Country: United States
- Branch: USN & USMC
- Type: Medical
- Part of: 1st Marine Logistics Group
- Garrison/HQ: Marine Corps Base Camp Pendleton
- Nickname: "Cheaters of Death"
- Engagements: World War II; Korean War; Vietnam War; Operation Desert Storm; Operation Enduring Freedom; Operation Iraqi Freedom; 2003 invasion of Iraq

Commanders
- Current commander: Captain S.M. Hussey, MC, USN

1st Medical Battalion is a unit of the United States Marine Corps operated by the United States Navy that provides expeditionary Health Service Support to Marine Corps forces forward deployed to operations or humanitarian missions. The unit is based out of Marine Corps Base Camp Pendleton and falls under the command of 1st Marine Logistics Group.

== Mission ==
Provides expeditionary health service support to the operating units of the First Marine Expeditionary Force to preserve and save every possible life and support the war fighting capability of the MEF.

== Subordinate units ==
- Headquarters and Services Company (HSC)
- Surgical Company A (A Company)
- Surgical Company B (B Company)
- Surgical Company C (C Company)

Each lettered Surgical Company consists of 4 Surgical Platoons that provide Role 2 Light Maneuver capabilities consisting of command and control, damage control resuscitation, damage control surgery, limited patient holding, radiology, laboratory and blood banking capabilities and MEDEVAC personnel and equipment. Typically, the Surgical Companies and Surgical Platoons are task organized to support the full range of Special Purpose Marine Air Ground Task Force units.

== History ==
=== 1940 - 1941 ===
Activated September 6, 1940 at Quantico, Virginia, as the 1st Medical Battalion and assigned to the 1st Marine Brigade.

Deployed during October 1940 to Guantanamo Bay, Cuba.

Reassigned during February 1941 to the 1st Marine Division.

Relocated during April 1941 to Quantico, Virginia, and Parris Island, South Carolina.

Relocated during September 1941 to New River, North Carolina.

=== 1942 - 1947 ===
Deployed during June - July 1942 to Wellington, New Zealand.

Participated in the following World War II campaigns:

- Guadalcanal
- Eastern New Guinea
- New Britain
- Peleliu
- Okinawa

Participated in the occupation of North China, September 1945 - May 1947.

Redeployed during May 1947 to Guam.

=== 1947 - 1964 ===
Reactivated 16 July 1947 at Camp Pendleton, California, and assigned to the 1st Marine Division, Fleet Marine Force.

Deployed during August 1950 to Kobe, Japan.

Participated in the Korean War, September 1950 - July 1953, operating from

- Inchon-Seoul
- Chosin Reservoir
- East-Central Front
- Western Front

Participated in the defense of the Korean Demilitarized Zone, July 1953 - April 1955.

Relocated during April 1955 to Camp Pendleton, California.

=== 1965 - 1993 ===
Deployed during June 1965 to Okinawa.

Participated in the Vietnam War, March 1966 - April 1971, operating from

- Chu Lai
- Da Nang
- An Hoa
- Quang Tri
- Phu Bai

Relocated during April 1971 to Camp Pendleton, California.

Placed under the operational control of the 1st Force Service Support Group, Fleet Marine Force, on 30 March 1976.

Participated in Operations Desert Shield and Desert Storm, Southwest Asia, August 1990 - April 1991.

Participated in Operation Restore Hope, Somalia, December 1992 - January 1993.

=== 2003 - Present ===
Deployed during February 2003 to Kuwait in support of Operation Enduring Freedom.

Participated in Operation Iraqi Freedom, Iraq, March - September 2003 and February - September 2004.

Elements participated in Operation Iraqi Freedom, Iraq, 2004 - 2009.

1st Force Service Support Group (FSSG) was redesignated as 1st Marine Logistics Group (MLG), 21 October 2005.

Elements participated in Operation Enduring Freedom, Afghanistan, 2009 - 2014.

Elements participated in Operation Border Support, Southwestern U.S., November 2018 - February 2019 and April - September 2019.

Elements attached in support of Special Purpose Marine Air Ground Task Force (SPMAGTF) Crisis Response US CENTCOM participated in Operation Allies Refuge, January - November 2021.

== Honors and awards ==
Presidential Unit Citation Streamer with one Silver and three Bronze Stars

World War II

- Guadalcanal - 1942
- Peleliu, Ngesbus - 1944
- Okinawa - 1945

Korea

- 1950
- 1951

Vietnam

- 1966 - 1967
- 1967 - 1968

Iraq

- 2003

Joint Meritorious Unit Award Streamer

- Somalia 1992 - 1993

Navy Unit Commendation Streamer with one Bronze Star

- Korea 1952 - 1953
- Southwest Asia 1990 - 1997

Meritorious Unit Commendation Streamer with two Bronze Stars

- Vietnam 1968 - 1969
- 1984 - 1986
- 1995 - 1997

American Defense Service Streamer with one Bronze Star

Asiatic-Pacific Campaign Streamer with one Silver and one Bronze Star

World War II Victory Streamer

Navy Occupation Service Streamer with "Asia"

China Service Streamer

National Defense Service Streamer with three Bronze Stars

Korean Service Streamer with two Silver Stars

Armed Forces Expeditionary Streamer

Vietnam Service Streamer with two Silver and two Bronze Stars

Southwest Asia Service Streamer with two Bronze Stars

Afghanistan Campaign Streamer with one Bronze Star

Iraq Campaign Streamer with three Bronze Stars

Global War on Terrorism Expeditionary Streamer

Global War on Terrorism Service Streamer

Korean Presidential Unit Citation Streamer

Vietnam Cross of Gallantry with Palm Streamer

Vietnam Meritorious Unit Citation Civil Actions Streamer

== See also ==
- Medical Corps (United States Navy)
- Navy Dental Corps
- Navy Nurse Corps
- Navy Medical Service Corps
- Hospital corpsman
- List of United States Marine Corps battalions
