= Aftermath of World War I =

Events after the end of the war in 1918

- Part of the interwar period
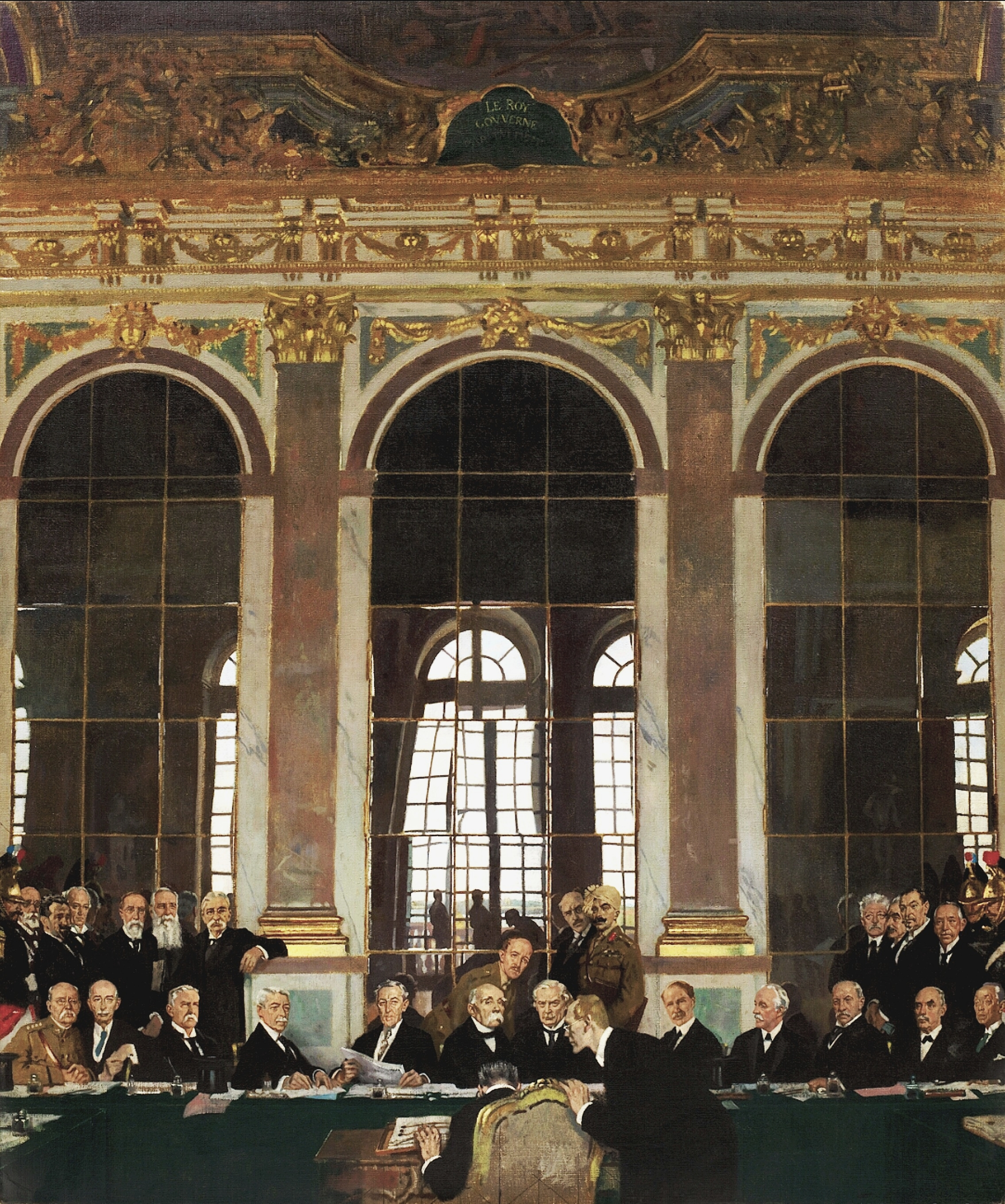
- William Orpen's The Signing of Peace in the Hall of Mirrors: the signing of the Treaty of Versailles in the Hall of Mirrors at the Palace of Versailles in 1919
- Date: 11 November 1918 – 1 September 1939 (20 years, 9 months and 3 weeks)
- Outcome: Political and social changes such as: Paris Peace Conference (1919–1920); International relations (1919–1939); Revolutions of 1917–1923; World War II

The aftermath of World War I saw far-reaching and wide-ranging cultural, economic, and social change across Europe, Asia, and Africa, and in areas outside those that were directly involved. Four empires collapsed due to the war, old countries were abolished, new ones were formed, boundaries were redrawn, international organizations were established, and many new and old ideologies took a firm hold in people's minds. Additionally, culture in the nations involved was greatly changed. World War I also had the effect of bringing political transformation to most of the principal parties involved in the conflict, transforming them into electoral democracies by bringing near-universal suffrage for the first time in history, as in Germany (1919 German federal election), the United Kingdom (1918 United Kingdom general election), and the United States (1920 United States presidential election).

== Blockade of Germany ==
Through the period from the Armistice of 11 November 1918 until the signing of the Treaty of Versailles with the Weimar Republic on 28 June 1919, the Allies maintained the naval blockade of Germany that had begun during the war. As the German economy was dependent on imports, it is estimated that around half a million civilians had died. N. P. Howard of the University of Sheffield estimated that a quarter of a million excess deaths occurred in the eight-month period following the conflict's conclusion, 40% of which took place in November 1918, making for 474,085 excess deaths for the entire 1914–1919 period. The continuation of the blockade after the fighting ended, as author Robert Leckie wrote in Delivered from Evil, did much to "torment the Germans ... driving them with the fury of despair into the arms of the devil." The terms of the Armistice did allow food to be shipped into Germany, but the Allies required that Germany provide the means (the shipping) to do so. The German government was required to use its gold reserves, being unable to secure a loan from the United States.

Historian Sally Marks said that while "[a]llied warships remained in place against a possible resumption of hostilities, the Allies offered food and medicine after the armistice, but Germany refused to allow its ships to carry supplies". Further, Marks stated that despite the problems facing the Allies, from the German government, "Allied food shipments arrived in Allied ships before the charge made at Versailles". This position is also supported by Elisabeth Gläser who notes that an Allied task force, to help feed the German population, was established in early 1919 and that by May 1919 Germany "became the chief recipient of American and Allied food shipments". Gläser further claims that during the early months of 1919, while the main relief effort was being planned, France provided food shipments to Bavaria and the Rhineland. She further claims that the German government delayed the relief effort by refusing to surrender their merchant fleet to the Allies. Finally, she concludes that "the very success of the relief effort had in effect deprived the [Allies] of a credible threat to induce Germany to sign the Treaty of Versailles. However, it is also the case that for eight months following the end of hostilities, some form of blockade was continually in place, with some contemporary estimates that a further 100,000 casualties among German civilians due to starvation were caused, on top of the hundreds of thousands which already had occurred. Food shipments, furthermore, had been entirely dependent on Allied goodwill, causing at least in part the post-hostilities irregularity.

== Paris Peace Conference ==
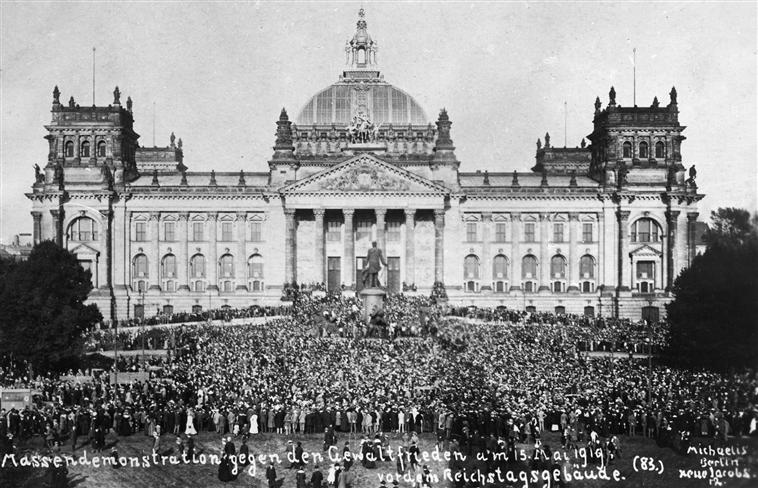
Demonstration against the Treaty in front of the Reichstag building

After the Paris Peace Conference of 1919, the signing of the Treaty of Versailles on 28 June 1919, between Germany on the one side and France, Italy, Britain and other minor allied powers on the other, officially ended war between those countries. Other treaties ended the relationships of the United States and the other Central Powers. Included in the 440 articles of the Treaty of Versailles were the demands that Germany officially accept responsibility "for causing all the loss and damage" of the war and pay economic reparations. The treaty drastically limited the German military machine: German troops were reduced to 100,000 and the country was prevented from possessing major military armaments such as tanks, warships, warplanes, armored vehicles and submarines.

== Influenza epidemic ==
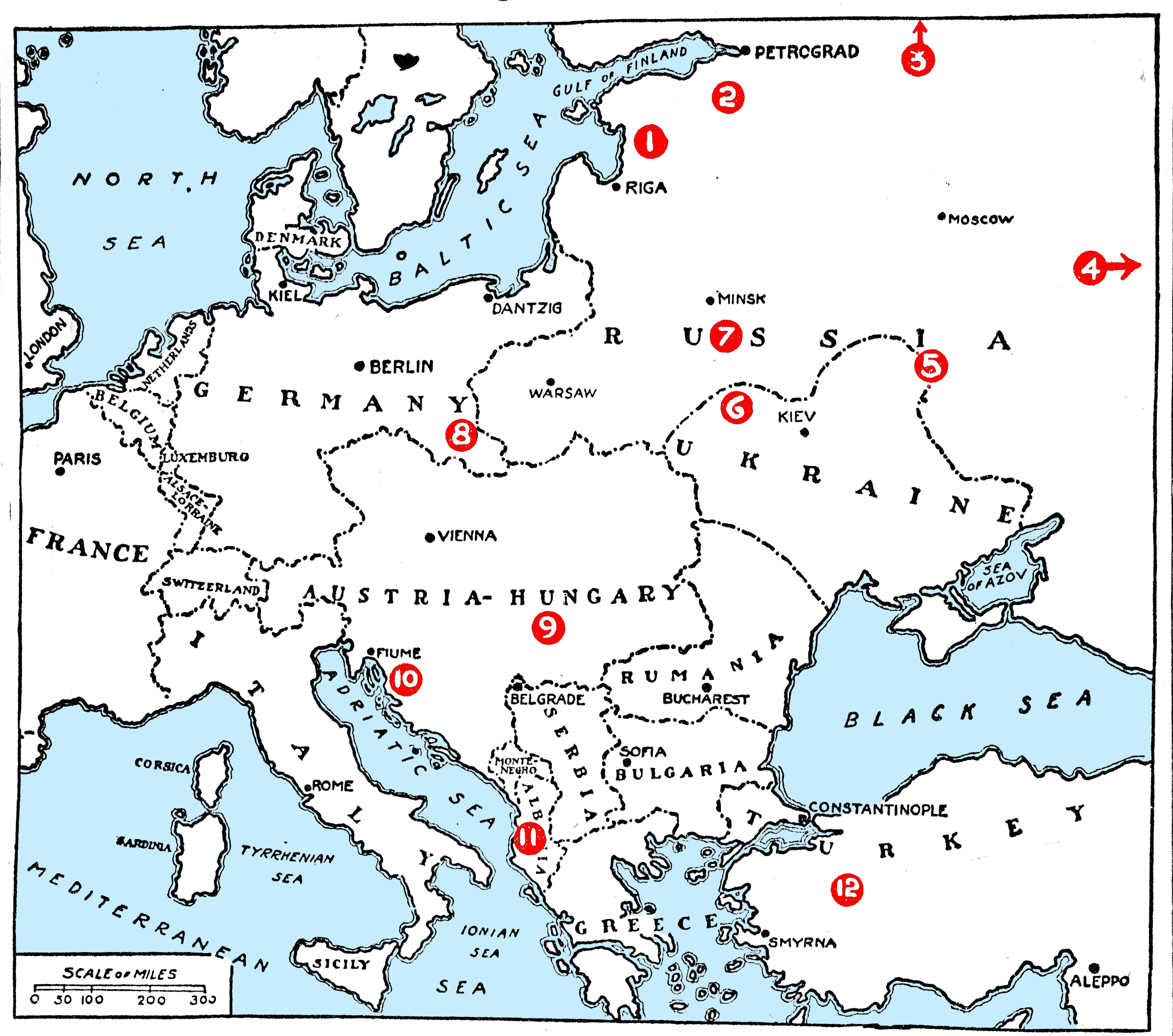
On November 9, 1919, the New-York Tribune prints this map of the ongoing armed conflict in Europe one year after World War I ended: 1. War of Independence in Estonia and Latvia; 2. White Army of General Yudenich; 3. North Russia intervention; 4. White Army of Kolchak's in Siberia; 5. General Denikin's White Army; 6. General Petlura's Ukrainian directorate; 7. Polish–Soviet War; 8. Silesia tension between the Poles and Germans.; 9. Romanian occupation of Hungary; 10. Gabriele D'Annunzio seizes Fiume, creates the Italian Regency of Carnaro; 11. In Albania promiscuous fighting is going on; 12. Turkish War of Independence

Historians continue to argue about the impact the 1918 flu pandemic had on the outcome of the war. It has been posited that the Central Powers may have been exposed to the viral wave before the Allies. The resulting casualties having greater effect, having been incurred during the war, as opposed to the allies who suffered the brunt of the pandemic after the Armistice. When the extent of the epidemic was realized, the respective censorship programs of the Allies and Central Powers limited the public's knowledge regarding the true extent of the disease. Because Spain was neutral, their media was free to report on the flu, giving the impression that it began there. This misunderstanding led to contemporary reports naming it the "Spanish flu". Investigative work by a British team led by virologist John Oxford of St Bartholomew's Hospital and the Royal London Hospital, identified a major troop staging and hospital camp in Étaples, France as almost certainly being the center of the 1918 flu pandemic. A significant precursor virus was harbored in birds, and mutated to pigs that were kept near the front. The exact number of deaths is unknown but about 50 million people are estimated to have died from the influenza outbreak worldwide. In 2005, a study found that the 1918 virus strain developed in birds and was similar to 21st century 'bird flu'.

== Formation of national identities ==
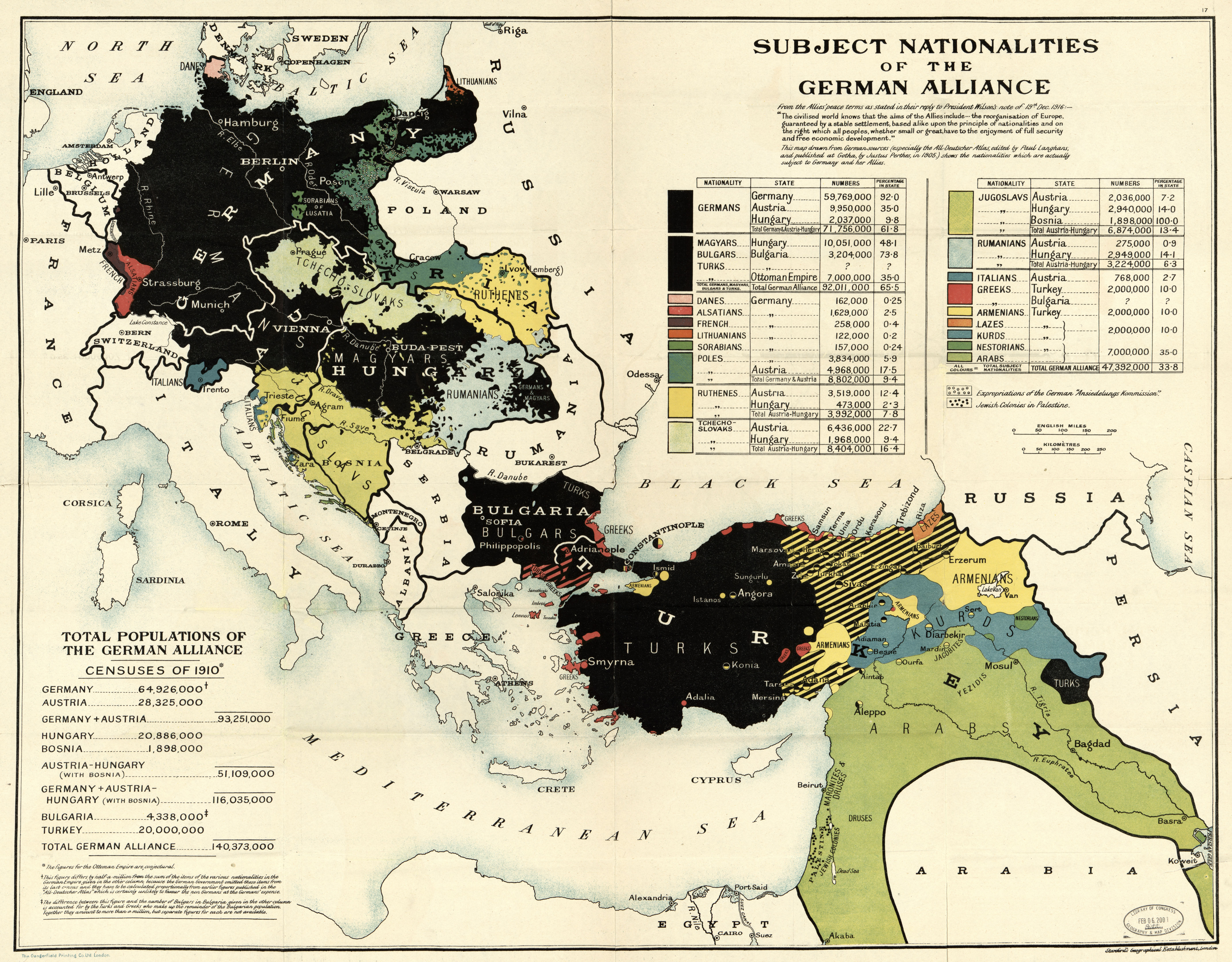
Subject nationalities of the German alliance

After 123 years, Poland re-emerged as an independent country. The Kingdom of Serbia and its dynasty, as a "minor Entente nation" and the country with the most casualties per capita, became the backbone of a new multinational state, the Kingdom of Serbs, Croats and Slovenes, later renamed Yugoslavia. The Kingdom of Bohemia and parts of the Kingdom of Hungary combined to create Czechoslovakia. Romania united all Romanian-speaking people under a single state leading to Greater Romania. Russia became the Soviet Union and lost Finland, Estonia, Lithuania, and Latvia, which became independent countries. The Ottoman Empire was soon replaced by Turkey and many of its territories became mandates under British or French rule.

In the British Empire, the war unleashed new forms of nationalism. In the Dominions of Australia and New Zealand, the Battle of Gallipoli became known as those nations' "Baptism of Fire". It was the first major war in which the newly established countries fought, and it was one of the first times that Australian troops fought as Australians, not just subjects of the British Crown, and independent national identities for these nations took hold. Anzac Day, commemorating the Australian and New Zealand Army Corps (ANZAC), celebrates this defining moment.

After the Battle of Vimy Ridge, where the Canadian divisions fought together for the first time as a single corps, Canadians began to refer to their country as a nation "forged from fire". Having succeeded on the same battleground where the "mother countries" had previously faltered, they were for the first time respected internationally for their own accomplishments. Like Australia and New Zealand, Canada entered the war as a Dominion of the British Empire and remained so, although it emerged with a greater measure of independence. When Britain declared war in 1914, the dominions were automatically at war; at the conclusion, Canada, Australia, New Zealand, and South Africa were individual signatories of the Treaty of Versailles.

Lobbying by Chaim Weizmann and fear that American Jews would encourage the United States to support Germany culminated in the British government's Balfour Declaration of 1917, endorsing creation of a Jewish homeland in Palestine. A total of more than 1,172,000 Jewish soldiers served in the Allied and Central Power forces in World War I, including 275,000 in Austria-Hungary and 450,000 in Tsarist Russia.

The establishment of the modern state of Israel and the roots of the continuing Israeli–Palestinian conflict are partially found in the unstable power dynamics of the Middle East that resulted from World War I. Before the end of the war, the Ottoman Empire had maintained a modest level of peace and stability throughout some parts of the Middle East, although during the war the Ottomans conducted the ethnically and religiously motivated Greek genocide, Armenian genocide and Assyrian genocide, as well as overseeing the Great Famine of Mount Lebanon. With the fall of the Ottoman government, power vacuums developed and conflicting claims to land and nationhood began to emerge. The political boundaries drawn by the victors of World War I were quickly imposed, sometimes after only cursory consultation with the local population. These continue to be problematic in the 21st-century struggles for national identity. While the dissolution of the Ottoman Empire at the end of World War I was pivotal in contributing to the modern political situation of the Middle East, including the Arab-Israeli conflict, the end of Ottoman rule also spawned lesser-known disputes over water and other natural resources.

The prestige of Germany and German things in Latin America remained high after the war but did not recover to its pre-war levels. Indeed, in Chile the war brought an end to a period of intense scientific and cultural influence—a period writer Eduardo de la Barra scornfully called "the German bewitchment" (Spanish: el embrujamiento alemán).

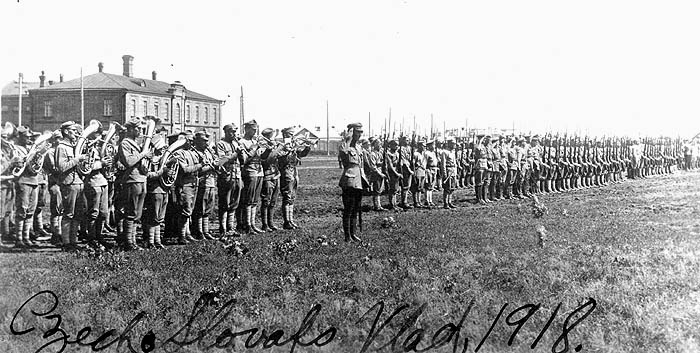
Czechoslovak Legion, Vladivostok, 1918

The Transylvanian and Bukovinian Romanians who were taken prisoners of war fought as the Romanian Volunteer Corps in Russia, Romanian Legion of Siberia and Romanian Legion in Italy. Taking part in the Eastern Front as part of the Russian Army and since summer 1917 in the Romanian front as part of the Romanian Army. As a supporter of the White movement with the Czechoslovak Legion against the Red Army during the Russian Civil War. In the battles of Montello, Vittorio Veneto, Sisemolet, Piave, Cimone, Monte Grappa, Nervesa and Ponte Delle Alpi as part of the Italian Army against Austria-Hungary and in 1919 as part of the Romanian Army in the Hungarian-Romanian War.

In the late spring of 1918, three new states were formed in the South Caucasus: the First Republic of Armenia, the Azerbaijan Democratic Republic, and the Democratic Republic of Georgia, which declared their independence from the Russian Empire. Two other minor entities were established, the Centrocaspian Dictatorship and South West Caucasian Republic (the former was liquidated by Azerbaijan in the autumn of 1918 and the latter by a joint Armenian-British task force in early 1919). With the withdrawal of the Russian armies from the Caucasus front in the winter of 1917–18, the three major republics braced for an imminent Ottoman advance, which commenced in the early months of 1918. Solidarity was briefly maintained when the Transcaucasian Federative Republic was created in the spring of 1918, but this collapsed in May when the Georgians asked for and received protection from Germany and the Azerbaijanis concluded a treaty with the Ottoman Empire that was more akin to a military alliance. Armenia was left to fend for itself and struggled for five months against the threat of a full-fledged occupation by the Ottoman Turks before defeating them at the Battle of Sardarabad.

Greece fought against Turkish nationalists led by Mustafa Kemal, a war that eventually resulted in a massive population exchange between the two countries under the Treaty of Lausanne. According to various sources, several hundred thousand Greeks died during this period, which was tied in with the Greek genocide.

== Political upheavals ==
=== Revolutions ===
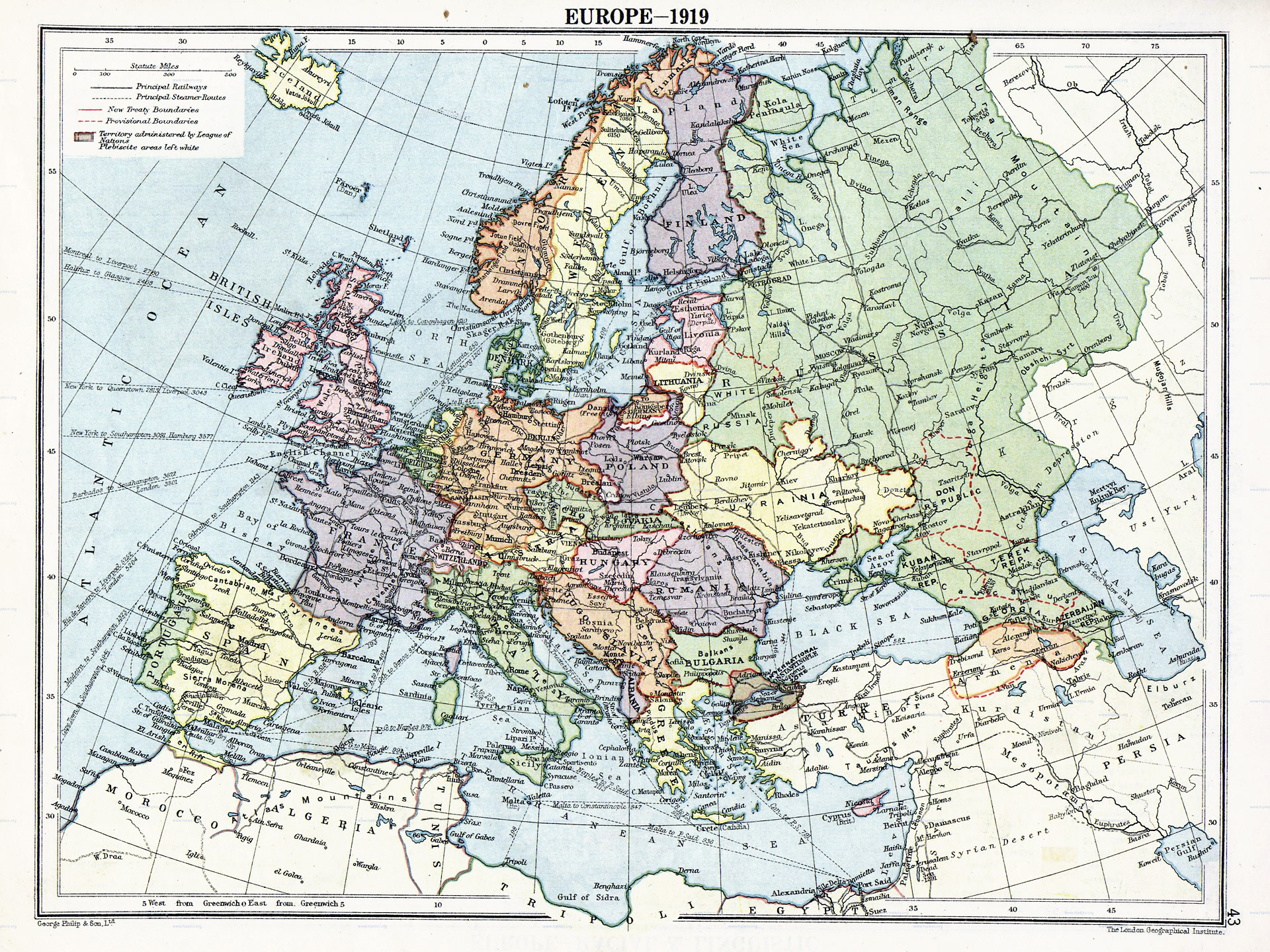
Political divisions of Europe in 1919 after the treaties of Brest-Litovsk and Versailles and before the treaties of Trianon, Kars, Riga and the creation of the Soviet Union, Irish Free State and Turkish Republic

A far-left and often explicitly communist revolutionary wave occurred in several European countries in 1917–1920, notably in Germany and Hungary. The single most important event precipitated by the privations of World War I was the Russian Revolution of 1917.

==== Austria-Hungary ====
With the war having turned decisively against the Central Powers, the people of Austria-Hungary lost faith in their allied countries, and before the armistice in November, nationalism had already led to several declarations of independence in south-central Europe after November 1918. As the central government had ceased to operate in vast areas, these regions found themselves without a government and many new groups attempted to fill the void. During this same period, the population was facing food shortages and was, for the most part, demoralized by the losses incurred during the war. Various political parties, ranging from nationalists, social democrats, and communists attempted to set up governments in the names of the different nationalities. In other areas, existing nation states such as Romania engaged regions that they considered to be theirs. These moves created de facto governments that complicated life for diplomats, idealists, and the Western allies.

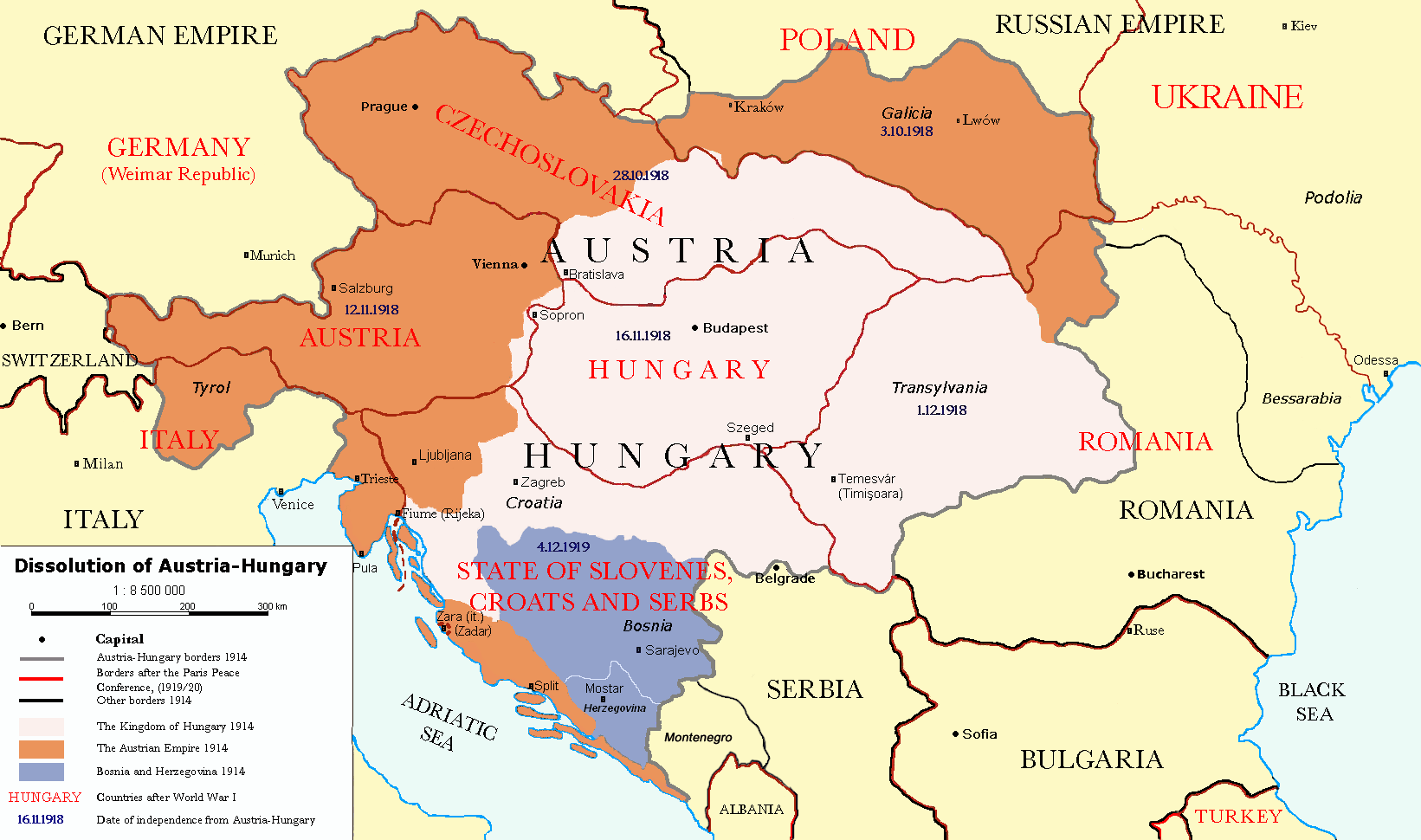
Division of Austria-Hungary after World War I

The Western forces were officially supposed to occupy the old Empire, but rarely had enough troops to do so effectively. They had to deal with local authorities who had their own agenda to fulfill. At the peace conference in Paris the diplomats had to reconcile these authorities with the competing demands of the nationalists who had turned to them for help during the war, the strategic or political desires of the Western allies themselves, and other agendas such as a desire to implement the spirit of the Fourteen Points.

For example, in order to live up to the ideal of self-determination laid out in the Fourteen Points, Germans, whether Austrian or German, should be able to decide their own future and government. However, the French especially were concerned that an expanded Germany would be a huge security risk. Further complicating the situation, delegations such as the Czechs and Slovenians made strong claims on some German-speaking territories.

The result was treaties that compromised many ideals, offended many allies, and set up an entirely new order in the area. Many people hoped that the new nation states would allow for a new era of prosperity and peace in the region, free from the bitter quarrelling between nationalities that had marked the preceding fifty years. This hope proved far too optimistic. Changes in territorial configuration after World War I included:

- Establishment of the Republic of German Austria and the Hungarian Democratic Republic, disavowing any continuity with the empire and exiling the Habsburg family in perpetuity.
- Eventually, after 1920, the new borders of Hungary did not include approx. two-thirds of the lands of the former Kingdom of Hungary, including areas where the ethnic Magyars were in a majority. The new republic of Austria maintained control over most of the predominantly German-controlled areas, but lost various other German majority lands in what was the Austrian Empire.

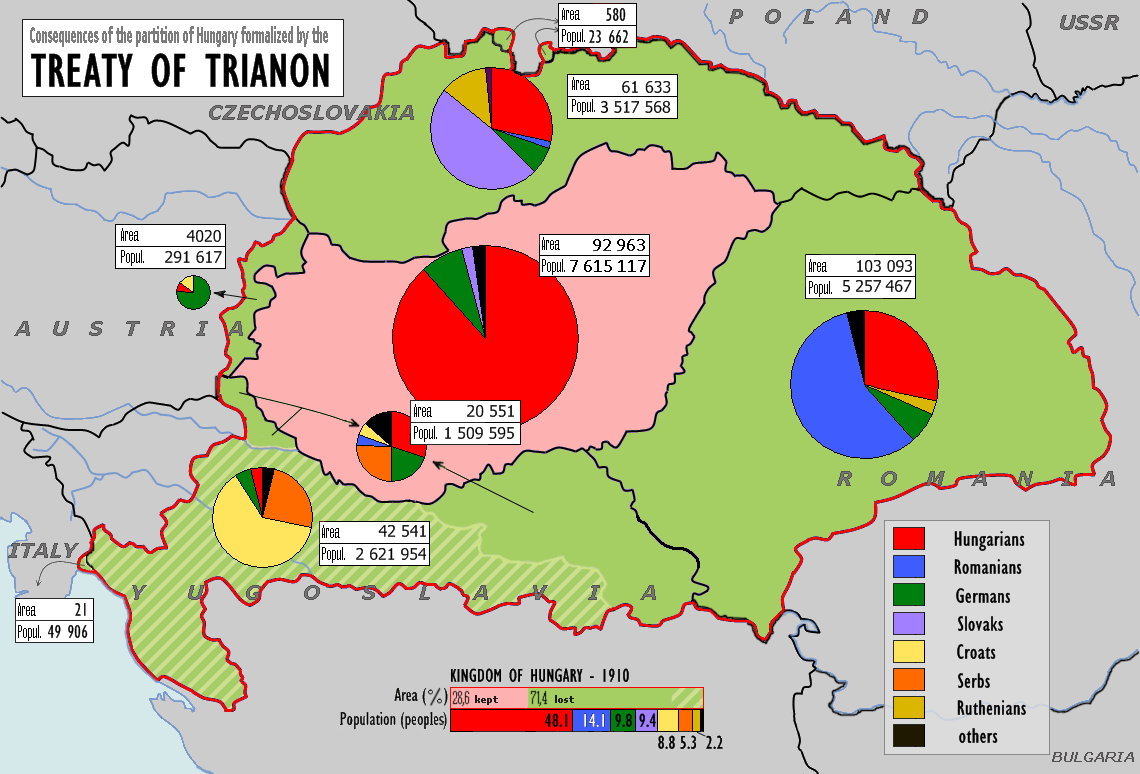
With the Treaty of Trianon, Kingdom of Hungary lost 72% of its territory (including Croatia) and 3.3 million people of Hungarian ethnicity.

- Bohemia, Moravia, Opava Silesia and the western part of the Duchy of Cieszyn, large part of Upper Hungary and Carpathian Ruthenia formed the new Czechoslovakia.
- Galicia, the eastern part of the Duchy of Cieszyn, northern Árva County and northern Szepes County were transferred to Poland.
- the Southern half of the County of Tyrol and Trieste were granted to Italy.
- Bosnia and Herzegovina, Croatia-Slavonia, Međimurje, Dalmatia, Slovenia, Syrmia, parts of Bács-Bodrog, Baranya, Torontál and Temes Counties were joined with Serbia to form the Kingdom of the Serbs, Croats and Slovenes, later Yugoslavia.
- Transylvania, parts of Banat, Crișana, and Maramureș and Bukovina became part of Romania.
- The Austro-Hungarian concession in Tianjin was ceded to the Republic of China.

These changes were recognized in, but not caused by, the Treaty of Versailles. They were subsequently further elaborated in the Treaty of Saint-Germain and the Treaty of Trianon.

The 1919 treaties generally included guarantees of minority rights, but there was no enforcement mechanism. The new states of eastern Europe mostly all had large ethnic minorities. Millions of Germans found themselves in the newly created countries as minorities. More than two million ethnic Hungarians found themselves living outside of Hungary in Czechoslovakia, Romania and the Kingdom of the Serbs, Croats and Slovenes. Many of these national minorities found themselves in hostile situations because the modern governments were intent on defining the national character of the countries, often at the expense of the other nationalities. The interwar years were hard for religious minorities in the new states built around ethnic nationalism. The Jews were especially distrusted because of their minority religion and distinct subculture. This was a dramatic come-down from the days of the Austro-Hungarian Empire. Although antisemitism had been widespread during Habsburg rule, Jews faced no official discrimination because they were, for the most part, ardent supporters of the multi-national state and the monarchy.

The economic disruption of the war and the end of the Austro-Hungarian customs union created great hardship in many areas. Although many states were set up as democracies after the war, one by one, with the exception of Czechoslovakia, they reverted to some form of authoritarian rule. Many quarreled amongst themselves but were too weak to compete effectively. Later, when Germany rearmed, the nation states of south-central Europe were unable to resist its attacks, and fell under German domination to a much greater extent than had ever existed in Austria-Hungary.

==== Germany ====
In Germany, there was a socialist revolution which led to the brief establishment of a number of communist political systems in (mainly urban) parts of the country, the abdication of Kaiser Wilhelm II, and the creation of the Weimar Republic.

On 28 June 1919 the Weimar Republic was forced, under threat of continued Allied advance, to sign the Treaty of Versailles. Germany viewed the one-sided treaty as a humiliation and as blaming it for the entire war. While the intent of the treaty was to assign guilt to Germany to justify financial reparations, the notion of blame took root as a political issue in German society and was never accepted by nationalists, although it was argued by some, such as German historian Fritz Fischer. The German government disseminated propaganda to further promote this idea, and funded the Centre for the Study of the Causes of the War to this end.

132 billion gold marks ($31.5 billion, 6.6 billion pounds) were demanded from Germany in reparations, of which only 50 billion had to be paid. Combined with the weight of war debt and already-high levels of inflation during the war, this weakened the finances of the German state. Whilst the value of the mark was stabilised during 1921 at around 90 marks to the dollar, hyperinflation caused in part by the printing of money to cover government expenses without raising taxes, particularly to pay workers striking in the occupied Ruhr, plagued Germany between late 1921 and 1923. German officials claimed that this was due to the need to buy foreign currency to make reparations payments, however during the period of hyperinflation little in the way of cash reparations was paid by Germany, with large payments of cash reparation only resuming in 1924. In contrast, Allied analysis of German statistics showed that printing of paper currency was being used to maintain tax rates much lower than in Allied countries, to fund relatively high levels of state expenditure, and that this effect was being worsened by unrestricted capital flight from Germany. In this period the worth of fiat Papiermarks with respect to the earlier commodity Goldmarks was reduced to one trillionth (one million millionth) of its value. In December 1922 the Reparations Commission declared Germany in default, and on 11 January 1923 French and Belgian troops occupied the Ruhr until 1925.

The treaty required Germany to permanently reduce the size of its army to 100,000 men, and destroy their tanks, air force, and U-boat fleet (her capital ships, moored at Scapa Flow, were scuttled by their crews to prevent them from falling into Allied hands).

Germany saw relatively small amounts of territory transferred to Denmark, Czechoslovakia, and Belgium, a larger amount to France (including the temporary French occupation of the Rhineland) and the greatest portion as part of a reestablished Poland. Germany's overseas colonies were divided between a number of Allied countries, most notably the United Kingdom in Africa, but it was the loss of the territory that composed the newly independent Polish state, including the German city of Danzig and the separation of East Prussia from the rest of Germany, that caused the greatest outrage. Nazi propaganda would feed on a general German view that the treaty was unfair – many Germans never accepted the treaty as legitimate, and lent their political support to Adolf Hitler. As seen in Mein Kampf, Hitler writes, "Versailles was not the misfortune, but the shame of a whole people." and "The Treaty of Versailles is a shame and a disgrace, this Diktat (dictated peace) is an unprecedented plundering of our People."

Much of the result of this was predicted and warned of by President Woodrow Wilson in his famous Fourteen Points advocating instead for "peace without victory" driven by the belief that excessively harsh punishment of Germany would breed resentment and inevitably lead to future conflict, thus failing to secure lasting global peace.

==== Ottoman Empire ====
Borders of Turkey according to the Treaty of Sèvres (1920) which was annulled and replaced by the Treaty of Lausanne in 1923

At the end of the war, the Allies occupied Constantinople (Istanbul) and the Ottoman government collapsed. The Treaty of Sèvres, designed to repair damage caused by Ottomans during the war to the winning Allies, was signed by Ottoman Empire on 10 August 1920, but was never ratified by the Sultan.

The occupation of Smyrna by Greece on 18 May 1919 triggered a nationalist movement to rescind the terms of the treaty. Turkish revolutionaries led by Mustafa Kemal Atatürk, a successful Ottoman commander, rejected the terms enforced at Sèvres and under the guise of General Inspector of the Ottoman Army, left Istanbul for Samsun to organize the remaining Ottoman forces to resist the terms of the treaty. On the eastern front, after Turkey's invasion of Armenia in 1920 and the signing of the Treaty of Kars with Soviet Russia, Turkey took control over Western Armenia.

On the western front, the growing strength of the Turkish National Movement forces led the Kingdom of Greece, with the backing of Britain, to invade deep into Anatolia in an attempt to deal a blow to the revolutionaries. At the Battle of Dumlupınar, the Greek army was defeated and forced into retreat, leading to the burning of Smyrna and the withdrawal of Greece from Asia Minor. With the nationalists empowered, the army marched on to reclaim Istanbul, resulting in the Chanak Crisis in which the British Prime Minister, David Lloyd George, was forced to resign. After Turkish resistance gained control over Anatolia and Istanbul, the Sèvres treaty was superseded by the Treaty of Lausanne which formally ended all hostilities and led to the creation of the modern Turkish Republic. As a result, Turkey became the only power of World War I to overturn the terms of its defeat, and negotiate with the Allies as an equal.

The Lausanne Treaty formally acknowledged the new League of Nations mandates in the Middle East, the cession of their territories on the Arabian Peninsula, and British sovereignty over Cyprus. The League of Nations granted Class A mandates for the Mandate for Syria and the Lebanon and British Mandate of Mesopotamia and Palestine, the latter comprising two autonomous regions: Mandate Palestine and the Emirate of Transjordan. Parts of the Ottoman Empire on the Arabian Peninsula became part of what is today Saudi Arabia and Yemen. The dissolution of the Ottoman Empire became a pivotal milestone in the creation of the modern Middle East, the result of which bore witness to the creation of new conflicts and hostilities in the region.

==== Russian Empire ====
European theatre of the Russian Civil War in 1918–19.

The Soviet Union benefited from Germany's loss, as one of the first terms of the armistice was the abrogation of the Treaty of Brest-Litovsk. At the time of the armistice Russia was in the grips of a civil war which left more than seven million people dead and large areas of the country devastated. The nation as a whole suffered socially and economically.

Lithuania, Latvia and Estonia gained independence. They were occupied again by the Soviet Union in 1940.

Finland gained a lasting independence, though it repeatedly had to fight the Soviet Union for its borders in the Winter War.

Armenia, Georgia, and Azerbaijan were established as independent states in the Caucasus region. However, after the withdrawal of the Russian Army in 1917 and during 1920 Turkish invasion of Armenia, Turkey captured the Armenian territory around Artvin, Kars, and Iğdır, and these territorial losses became permanent. As consequence of invasions of Turkey and Russian Red Army all three Transcaucasian countries were proclaimed as Soviet Republics in 1920 and in 1922 were absorbed into the Soviet Union as the Transcaucasian Socialist Federative Soviet Republic.

Romania gained Bessarabia from Russia.

The Russian concession of Tianjin was occupied by the Chinese Beiyang government in 1920; in 1924 the Soviet Union renounced its claims to the district.

==== United Kingdom ====
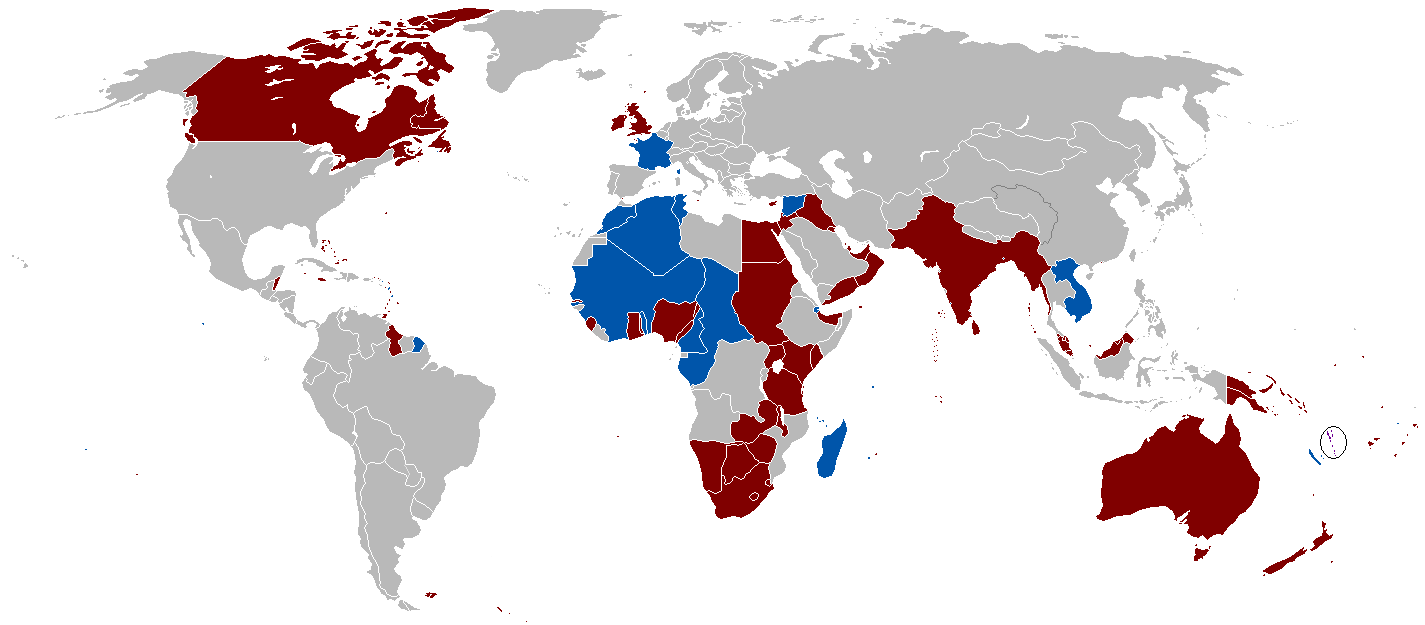
The British and French colonial empires reached their peaks after World War I.

In the United Kingdom of Great Britain and Ireland, funding the war had a severe economic cost. From being the world's largest overseas investor, it became one of its biggest debtors with interest payments forming around 40% of all government spending. Inflation more than doubled between 1914 and its peak in 1920, while the value of the Pound Sterling (consumer expenditure) fell by 61%. War reparations in the form of free German coal depressed local industry, precipitating the 1926 United Kingdom general strike.

British private investments abroad were sold, raising £550 million. However, £250 million in new investment also took place during the war. The net financial loss was therefore approximately £300 million; less than two years investment compared to the pre-war average rate and more than replaced by 1928. Material loss was "slight": the most significant being 40% of the British Merchant Navy sunk by German U-boats. Most of this was replaced in 1918 and all immediately after the war. The military historian Correlli Barnett has argued that "in objective truth the Great War in no way inflicted crippling economic damage on Britain" but that the war "crippled the British psychologically but in no other way".

Less concrete changes include the growing assertiveness of Commonwealth nations. Battles such as Gallipoli for Australia and New Zealand, and Vimy Ridge for Canada led to increased national pride and a greater reluctance to remain subordinate to Britain, leading to the growth of diplomatic autonomy in the 1920s. These battles were often decorated in propaganda in these nations as symbolic of their power during the war. Overseas possessions such as British India and Nigeria also became increasingly assertive, because of their participation in the war. The populations in these countries became increasingly aware of their own power and Britain's fragility.

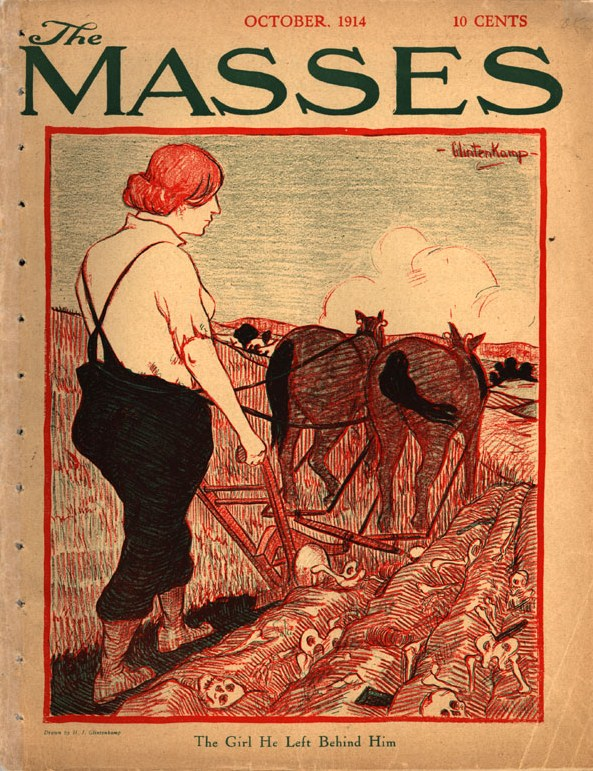
Cartoon predicting the aftermath of the war by Henry J. Glintenkamp, first published in The Masses in 1914.

In Ireland, the delaying of the Government of Ireland Act 1914, which was enacted to resolve the Home Rule issue, later exacerbated by the Government's severe response to the 1916 Easter Rising and its failed attempt to introduce conscription in Ireland in 1918, led to an increased support for separatist radicals. This led indirectly to the outbreak of the Irish War of Independence in 1919. The creation of the Irish Free State that followed this conflict in effect represented a territorial loss for the United Kingdom that was all but equal to the loss sustained by Germany, and furthermore, compared to Germany, a much greater loss in terms of its ratio to the country's prewar territory. However, the new Irish Free State remained a dominion within the British Empire.

World War I also caused a major realignment in British parliamentary politics by leading to the rise of the democratic socialist Labour Party and to the break-up and decline of the social liberal Liberal Party. Liberal Prime Minister H. H. Asquith ran into disagreements with not only the Conservative Party opposition but members of his own party led by David Lloyd George who disagreed with his handling of the war. Although Asquith agreed to form a coalition government, the disputes continued and eventually Lloyd George led a faction of the Liberals to form a new coalition government with the cooperation of the Conservatives. During the 1918 "coupon" election Conservatives and Liberals endorsed by the Coalition won a landslide majority in the British Parliament. However, the split between Lloyd George's National Liberals and Asquith's Independent Liberals fatally weakened the party.

On the other hand, the Labour Party remained unified despite tensions between pacifist and pro-war leaders; it used the war to expand the British trade union movement, and benefited from the establishment of universal suffrage under the Representation of the People Act 1918. As a result, both Liberal factions performed poorly in the 1922 general election while Labour became the Official Opposition for the first time. The Liberals reluctantly collaborated with Labour to help it form a brief minority government under Ramsay MacDonald. The Liberals would not fully reunify until Asquith's death in 1928, and thereafter primarily expressed influence through confidence and supply arrangements and coalitions in the event of a hung parliament.

==== China ====
The Republic of China had been one of the Allies; during the war, they had sent thousands of labourers to France. At the Paris Peace Conference in 1919, the Chinese delegation called for an end to Western imperialistic institutions in China, but was rebuffed. China requested at least the formal restoration of its territory of Jiaozhou Bay, under German colonial control as the Kiautschou Bay Leased Territory since 1898. But the western Allies rejected China's request, instead granting transfer to Japan of all of Germany's pre-war territory and rights in China. Subsequently, China did not sign the Treaty of Versailles, instead signing a separate peace treaty with Germany in 1921.

The Austro-Hungarian and German concessions in Tianjin were placed under the administration of the Chinese government; in 1920 they occupied the Russian area as well.

The western Allies' substantial accession to Japan's territorial ambitions at China's expense led to the May Fourth Movement in China, a social and political movement that had profound influence over subsequent Chinese history. The May Fourth Movement is often cited as the birth of Chinese nationalism, and both the Kuomintang and Chinese Communist Party consider the Movement to be an important period in their own histories.

=== France ===
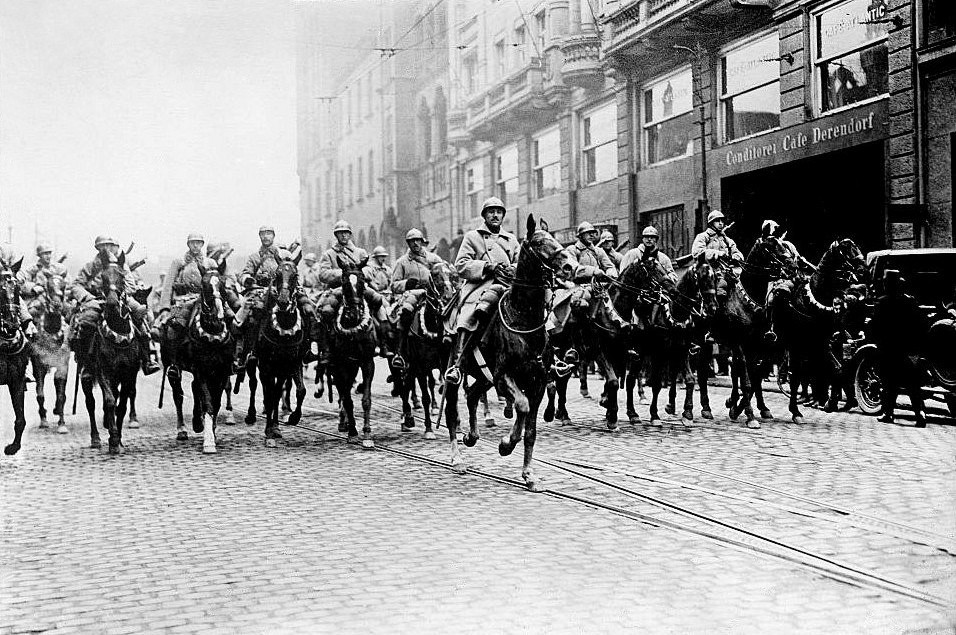
French cavalry entering Essen during the occupation of the Ruhr.

Alsace–Lorraine returned to France, the region which had been ceded to the Kingdom of Prussia in 1871 after the Franco-Prussian War. At the 1919 Peace Conference, Prime Minister Georges Clemenceau's aim was to ensure that Germany would not seek revenge in the following years. To this purpose, the chief commander of the Allied forces, Marshal Ferdinand Foch, had demanded that for the future protection of France the Rhine river should now form the border between France and Germany. Based on history, he was convinced that Germany would again become a threat, and, on hearing the terms of the Treaty of Versailles that had left Germany substantially intact, he observed that "This is not Peace. It is an Armistice for twenty years."

The destruction brought upon French territory was to be indemnified by the reparations negotiated at Versailles. This financial imperative dominated France's foreign policy throughout the 1920s, leading to the 1923 Occupation of the Ruhr in order to force Germany to pay. However, Germany was unable to pay, and obtained support from the United States. Thus, the Dawes Plan was negotiated after Prime Minister Raymond Poincaré's occupation of the Ruhr, and then the Young Plan in 1929.

Also extremely important in the War was the participation of French colonial troops (who amounted for around 10% of the total number of troops deployed by France across the war), including the Senegalese tirailleurs, and troops from Indochina, North Africa, and Madagascar. When these soldiers returned to their homelands and continued to be treated as second class citizens, many became the nuclei of pro-independence groups.

Furthermore, under the state of war declared during the hostilities, the French economy had been somewhat centralized in order to be able to shift into a "war economy", leading to a first breach with classical liberalism.

Finally, the socialists' support of the National Union government (including Alexandre Millerand's nomination as Minister of War) marked a shift towards the French Section of the Workers' International's (SFIO) turn towards social democracy and participation in "bourgeois governments", although Léon Blum maintained a socialist rhetoric.

==== Women in France ====
"But with its faceless state machinery and unremitting mechanized slaughter, the war instead collapsed these old ideals" (Roberts 2). When the war was over and the men returned home, the world was a vastly different place than it had been before the war. Many ideals and beliefs were shattered with the war. Those returning from the front lines, and even those who were on the Homefront, were left to pick up the pieces of what was left of those ideals and beliefs, and try to rebuild them. Before the Great War, many thought this war would be a quick war, like many before had been. With new technology and weapons though, the war was at a stalemate for a large part of it, dragging what many thought would be a quick war out into a long, grueling war. With so much death and destruction done to France, it is not surprising when looking back that the way of life for French citizens was forever changed.

Many citizens saw the change in culture and blamed the war for taking away the rose tinted glasses that society had viewed things through. Many scholars and writers, such as Drieu la Rochelle, found many ways to describe this new view on reality such as stripping away clothes (Roberts 2). This comparison of the new reality and clothing being stripped away also ties into the fact that gender roles changed greatly after the war.

During the war many jobs had been left to women because many men were fighting on the front lines. This gave women a new sense of freedom that they had not been able to experience ever before. Not many women wanted to go back to how things were before the war, when they expected to stay at home and take care of the house. When the war was over many of the older generations and men wanted women to return to their previous roles.

At a time when gender roles were so heavily defined and intertwined with the culture of many places, for French citizens viewing how many women went against said roles after World War I, or the Great War as it was called at the time, it was ghastly. While gender roles had slowly been changing over time since the Industrial Revolution gave more work options outside of the home in factories, it had never been such a quick and drastic change as it was after World War I. During the war many men went off to fight, leaving behind factory jobs that were usually seen as a man's job only. These jobs had to be filled and without men there to fill the jobs, it was women who stepped up to fill the hole instead. France suffered a great loss of life during World War I, leaving many jobs unable to be refilled even after the war.

Debates and discussions concerning gender identity and gender roles in relation to society became one of the main ways to discuss the war and people's stances on it (Roberts 5). The war left people struggling to grasp the new reality. There were mixed reactions to the new way of life after World War I and how it affected both men and women. Some people were willing to completely embrace the new standards that were emerging following the war, while others harshly rejected the changes, seeing the changes as summarizing all the horrors they experienced during the war. Others looked for ways to compromise between the new and old way of life, tried to combine the ideals and beliefs from before and after the war to find a healthy middle ground.

Discussions pertaining to women during post-war debates often split the view of women into three categories—the "modern woman," the "mother," and the "single woman" (Roberts 9). These categories broke up the view of women by the roles they took on, the jobs they did, the way they acted, or by the beliefs they might hold. These categories also came to encompass the views of gender roles in relation to before and after the war. The "mother" category relates back to the role of women before the Great War, the woman who stayed at home and took care of the household while the husband was off at work. The "modern woman" relates to how many women were after the war, working jobs meant for men, engaging in sexual pleasures, and often doing things at a fast pace. The "single woman" was the middle ground between the other two that were very different from one another. The "single woman" came to represent the women who would never be able to marry because there were not enough men for every woman to marry. (Roberts 10).

One thing that sparked much debate in regards to the postwar woman is fashion. During the war things like cloth material were rationed, with people being encouraged to not use as much fabric, so that there would be enough for the military. In response to these rations, women wore shorter dresses and skirts, usually about knee length, or pants. This change in apparel was something that many women continued to wear even after the war ended. It was such a drastic change to the clothing norms for women before the war. This change led to some "modern women" to be described in harsh lights, as if wearing dresses and skirts that short showed that those women were promiscuous.

Those coming back from the war, from the fighting, were traumatized and had wanted to come back to a home that was not changed in order to give themselves a sense of normalcy. When these men came back to a home that had changed a lot they did not know what to make of it. Gone were the times of defined gender roles that most of society conformed to. It was often hard for these men to accept these new changes, especially the changes in how women behaved.

=== Italy ===
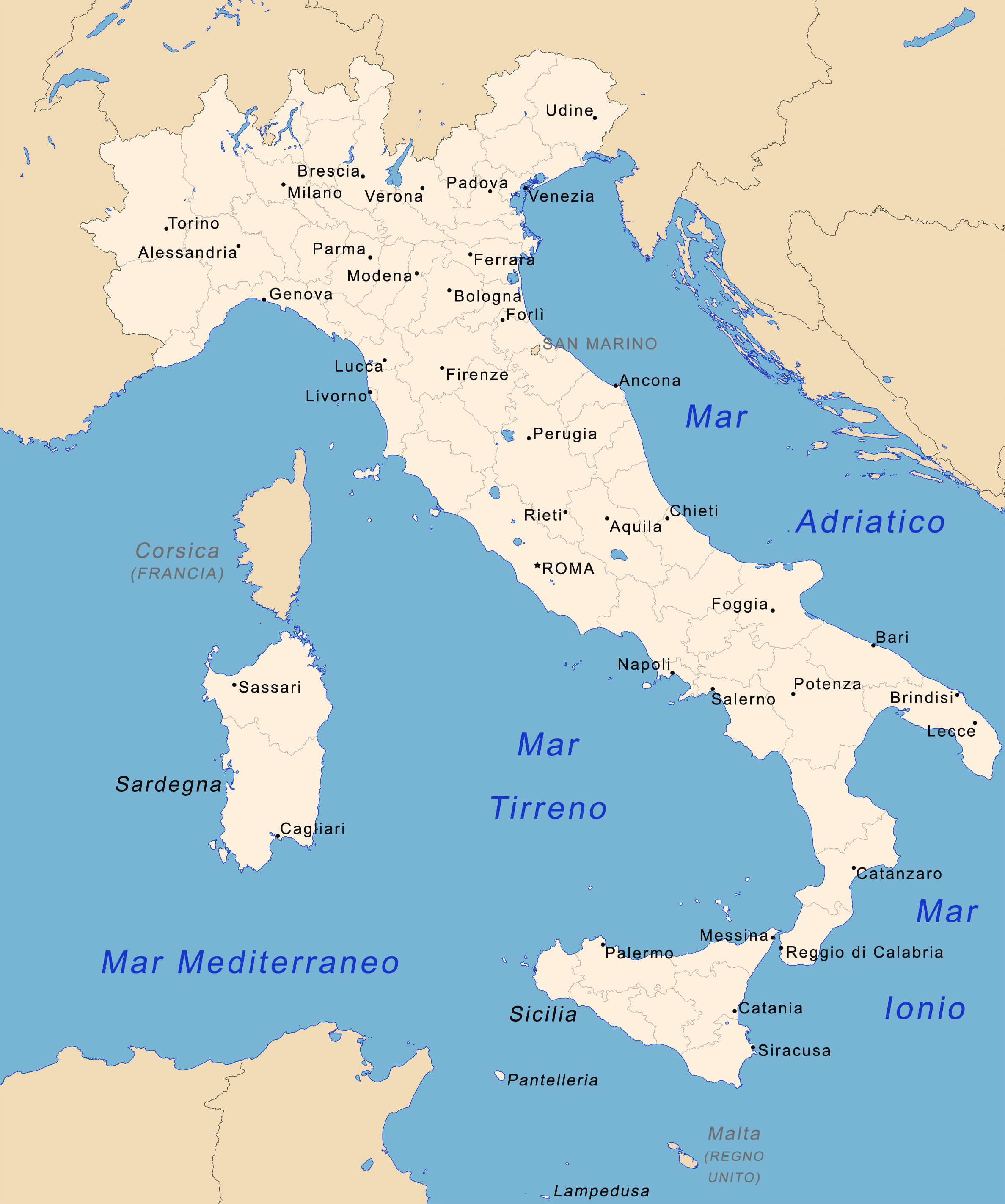
On the left, a map of the Kingdom of Italy before World War I, on the right, a map of the Kingdom of Italy after World War I.

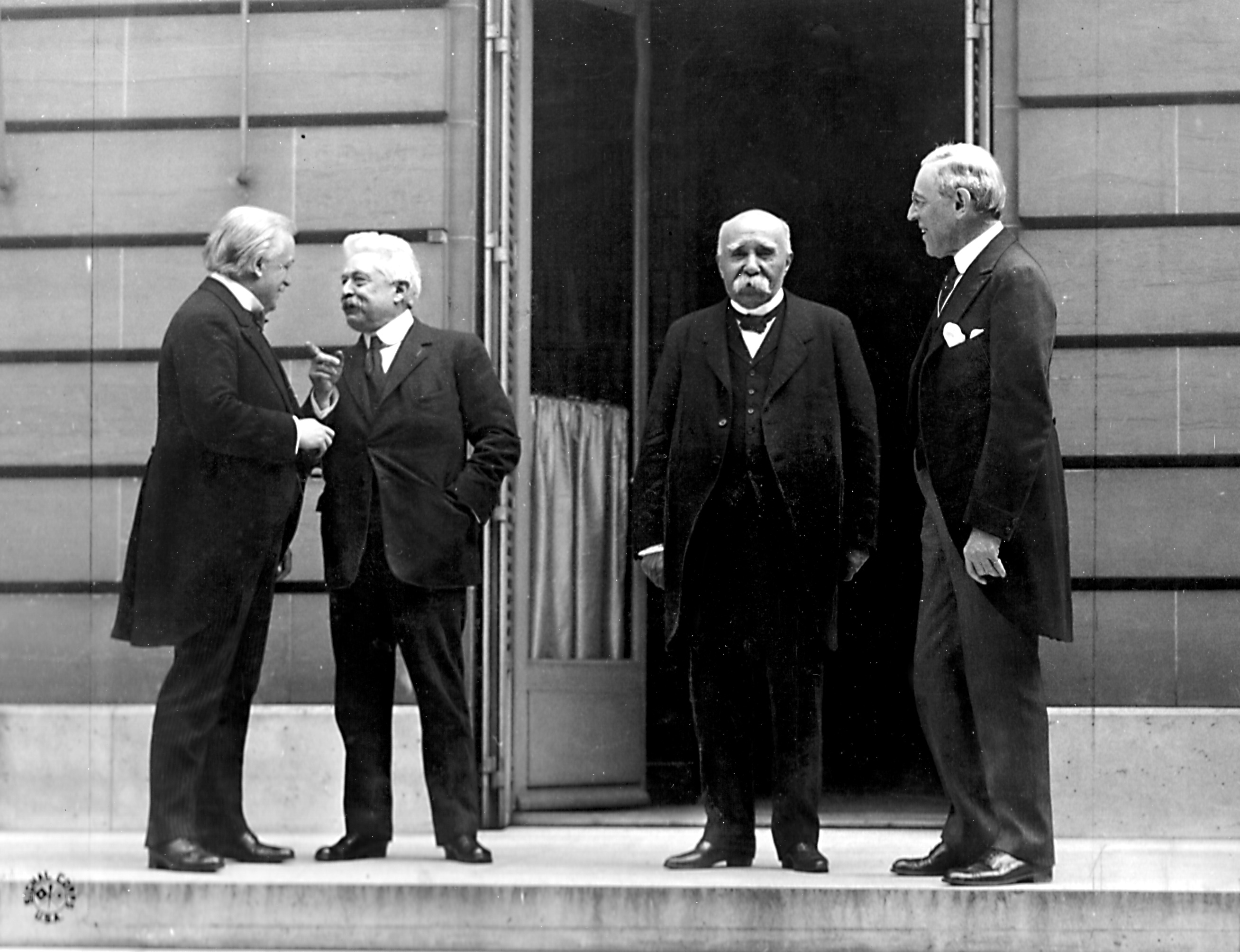
Italian Prime Minister Vittorio Emanuele Orlando (2nd from left) at the World War I peace negotiations in Versailles with David Lloyd George, Georges Clemenceau and Woodrow Wilson (from left)

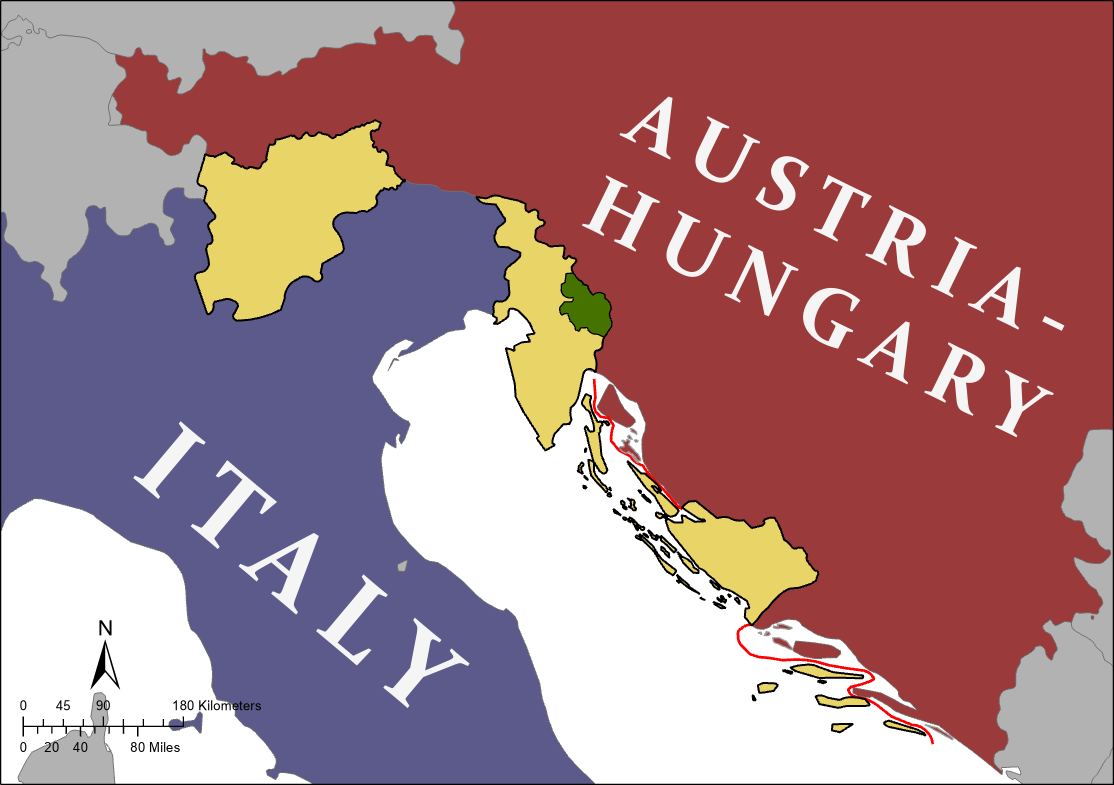
Territories promised to Italy by the secret Treaty of London (1915), i.e. Trentino-Alto Adige, the Julian March and Dalmatia (tan), and the Snežnik Plateau area (green). Dalmatia, after WWI, however, was not assigned to Italy but to Yugoslavia.

Even after 1870, after the unification of Italy, many ethnic Italian-speakers (Italians in Trentino-Alto Adige/Südtirol, Savoyard Italians, Corfiot Italians, Niçard Italians, Swiss Italians, Corsican Italians, Maltese Italians, Istrian Italians, and Dalmatian Italians) remained outside the borders of the Kingdom of Italy, planting the seeds of Italian irredentism.

Italy entered into World War I on May 23, 1915, with the aim of completing national unity: for this reason, the Italian intervention in World War I is also considered the Fourth Italian War of Independence, in a historiographical perspective that identifies in the latter the conclusion of the unification of Italy, whose military actions began during the revolutions of 1848 with the First Italian War of Independence.

In 1882, Italy joined with the German Empire and the Austro-Hungarian Empire to form the Triple Alliance. However, even if relations with Berlin became very friendly, the alliance with Vienna remained purely formal, as the Italians were keen to acquire Trentino and Trieste, parts of the Austro-Hungarian empire populated by Italians.

During World War I Italy aligned with the Allies, instead of joining Germany and Austria. This could happen since the alliance formally had merely defensive prerogatives, while the Central Empires were the ones who started the offensive. With the Treaty of London, Britain secretly offered Italy Trentino and Tyrol as far as Brenner, Trieste and Istria, all the Dalmatian coast except Fiume, full ownership of Albanian Valona and a protectorate over Albania, Antalya in Turkey and a share of the Turkish and German colonial empire, in exchange for Italy siding against the Central Empires.

On the Dalmatian coast, Italy established the Governorate of Dalmatia, which had the provisional aim of ferrying the territory towards full integration into the Kingdom of Italy, progressively importing national legislation in place of the previous one. The administrative capital was Zara. The Governorate of Dalmatia was evacuated following the Italo-Yugoslav agreements which resulted in the Treaty of Rapallo (1920).

After the victory, Vittorio Orlando, Italy's President of the Council of Ministers, and Sidney Sonnino, its Foreign Minister, were sent as the Italian representatives to Paris with the aim of gaining the promised territories and as much other land as possible. In particular, there was an especially strong opinion about the status of Fiume, which they believed was rightly Italian due to Italian population, in agreement with Wilson's Fourteen Points, the 9th of which read:

A readjustment of the frontiers of Italy should be effected along clearly recognizable lines of nationality

— 9th Fourteen Point of Woodrow Wilson

The Italian government was infuriated by the Fourteen Points of Woodrow Wilson, the President of the United States, as advocating national self-determination which meant that Italy would not gain Dalmatia as had been promised in the Treaty of London. In the Parliament of Italy, nationalists condemned Wilson's fourteen points as betraying the Treaty of London, while socialists claimed that Wilson's points were valid and claimed the Treaty of London was an offense to the rights of Slavs, Greeks and Albanians. Negotiations between Italy and the Allies, particularly the new Yugoslav delegation (replacing the Serbian delegation), agreed to a trade off between Italy and the new Kingdom of Yugoslavia, which was that Dalmatia, despite being claimed by Italy, would be accepted as Yugoslav, while Istria, claimed by Yugoslavia, would be accepted as Italian.

Nevertheless, by the end of the war the Allies realized they had made contradictory agreements with other Nations, especially regarding Central Europe and the Middle East. In the meetings of the "Big Four", in which Orlando's powers of diplomacy were inhibited by his lack of English, the Great powers were only willing to offer Trentino to the Brenner, the Dalmatian port of Zara, the island of Lagosta and a couple of small German colonies. All other territories were promised to other nations and the great powers were worried about Italy's imperial ambitions; Wilson, in particular, was a staunch supporter of Yugoslav rights on Dalmatia against Italy and despite the Treaty of London which he did not recognize. As a result of this, Orlando left the conference in a rage. This simply favored Britain and France, which divided among themselves the former Ottoman and German territories in Africa. Despite this, Orlando agreed to sign the Treaty of Versailles, which caused uproar against his government. The Treaty of Saint-Germain-en-Laye (1919) and the Treaty of Rapallo (1920) allowed the annexation of Trentino Alto-Adige, the Julian March, Istria, Kvarner as well as the Dalmatian city of Zara.

Furious over the peace settlement, the Italian nationalist poet Gabriele D'Annunzio led disaffected war veterans and nationalists to form the Free State of Fiume in September 1919. His popularity among nationalists led him to be called Il Duce ("The Leader"), and he used black-shirted paramilitary in his assault on Fiume. The leadership title of Duce and the blackshirt paramilitary uniform would later be adopted by the Fascist movement of Benito Mussolini. The demand for the Italian annexation of Fiume spread to all sides of the political spectrum, including Mussolini's Fascists.

The subsequent Treaty of Rome (1924) led to the annexation of the city of Fiume to Italy. The Italians claimed Fiume on the principle of self-determination, disregarding its mainly Slavic suburb of Susak. Italy's lack of territorial gain led to the outcome being denounced as a mutilated victory. The rhetoric of mutilated victory was adopted by Mussolini and led to the rise of Italian fascism, becoming a key point in the propaganda of Fascist Italy. Historians regard mutilated victory as a "political myth", used by fascists to fuel Italian imperialism and obscure the successes of liberal Italy in the aftermath of World War I. Italy also gained a permanent seat in the League of Nations's executive council.

==== Benito Mussolini in war and postwar ====
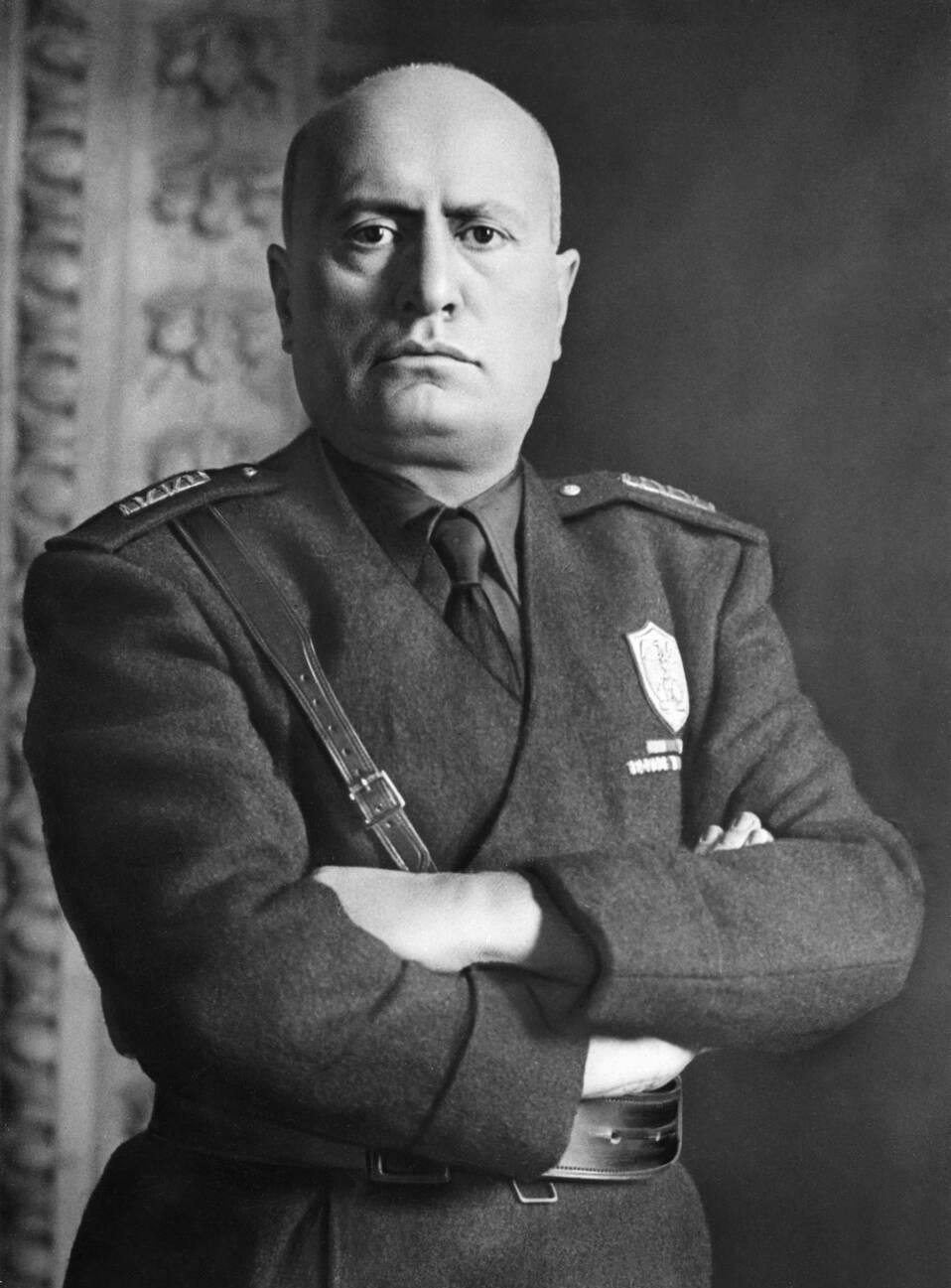
Benito Mussolini, who titled himself Duce and ruled the country from 1922 to 1943.

In 1914, Benito Mussolini was forced out of the Italian Socialist Party after calling for Italian intervention in the war against Austria-Hungary. Before World War I, Mussolini had opposed military conscription, protested against Italy's occupation of Libya and was the editor of the Socialist Party's official newspaper, Avanti!, but over time he simply called for revolution without mentioning class struggle. In 1914, Mussolini's nationalism enabled him to raise funds from Ansaldo (an armaments firm) and other companies to create his newspaper, Il Popolo d'Italia, which at first attempted to convince socialists and revolutionaries to support the war. The Allied Powers, eager to draw Italy to the war, helped finance the newspaper. Later, after the war, this publication would become the official newspaper of the Fascist movement. During the war, Mussolini served in the Army and was wounded once.

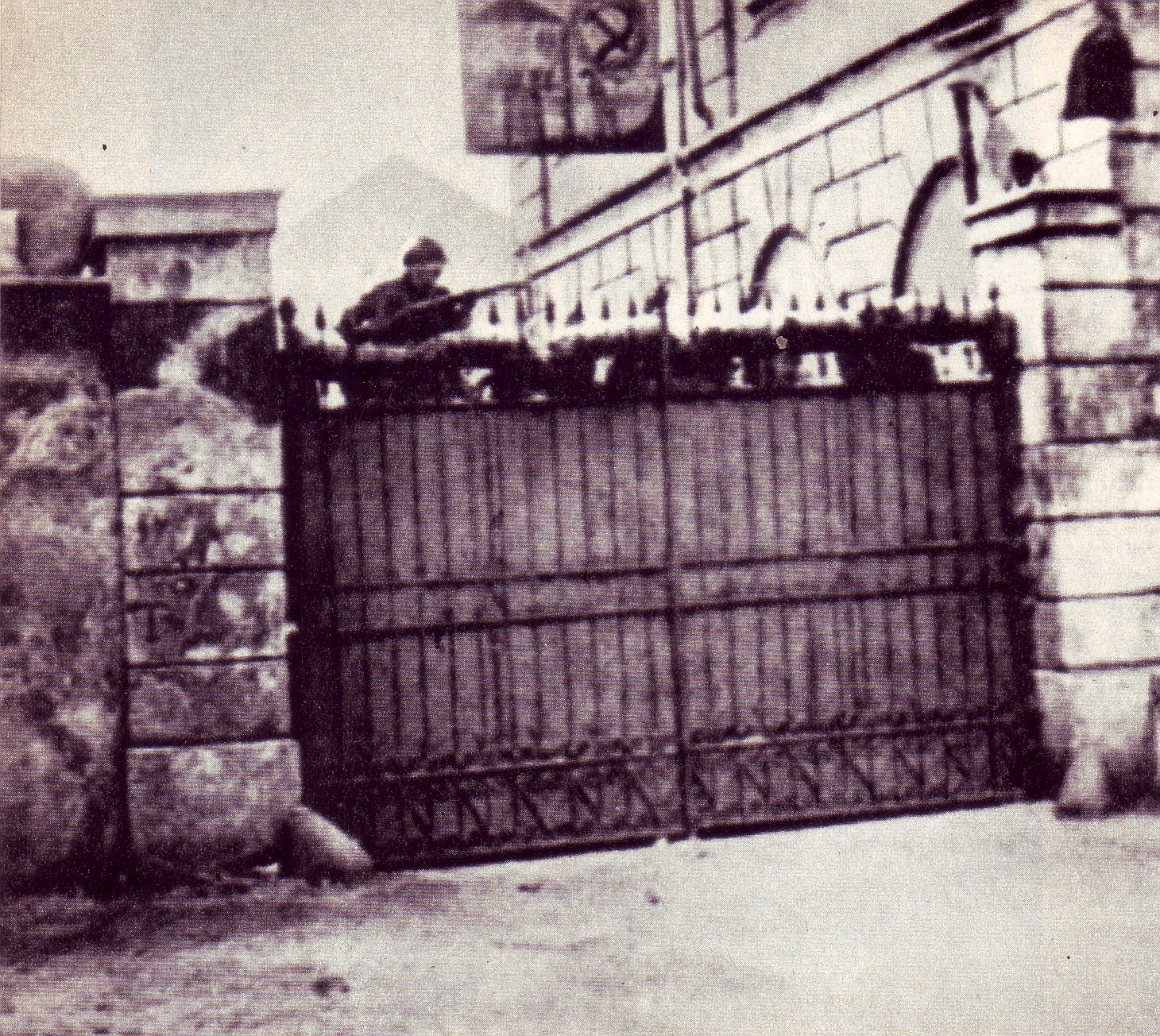
Armed workers occupying factories in Milan, September 1920, during the Biennio Rosso

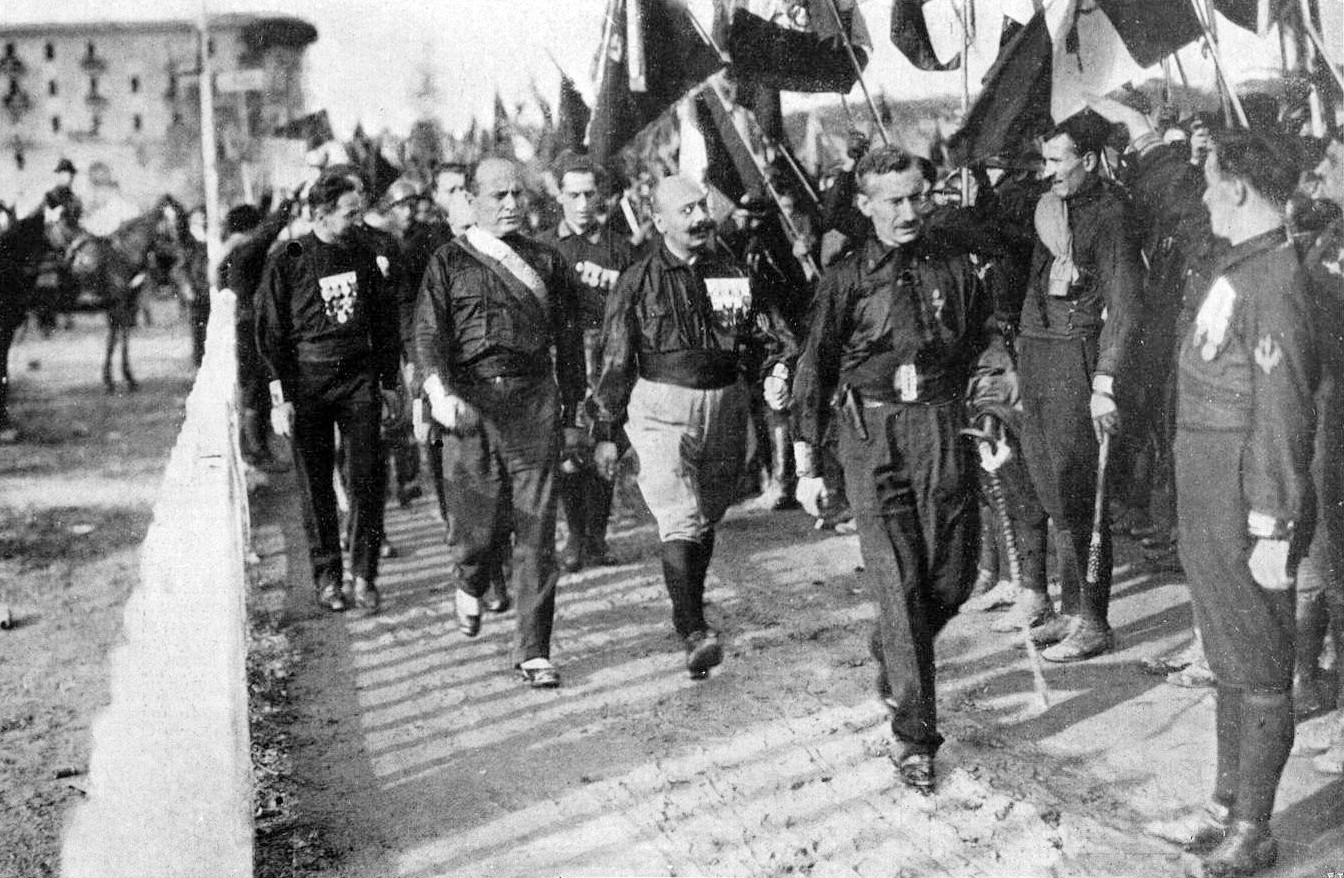
Benito Mussolini (second from left) and his Fascist Blackshirts in 1920

Following the end of the war and the Treaty of Versailles in 1919, Mussolini created the Fasci di Combattimento or Combat League. It was originally dominated by patriotic socialist and syndicalist veterans who opposed the pacifist policies of the Italian Socialist Party. This early Fascist movement had a platform more inclined to the left, promising social revolution, proportional representation in elections, women's suffrage (partly realized in 1925) and dividing rural private property held by estates. They also differed from later Fascism by opposing censorship, militarism and dictatorship. Mussolini claimed that "we are libertarians above all, loving liberty for everyone, even for our enemies" and said that freedom of thought and speech were among the "highest expressions of human civilization." On 15 April 1919, the Fascists made their debut in political violence when a group of members from the Fasci di Combattimento attacked the offices of Avanti!.

At the same time, the so-called Biennio Rosso (red biennium) took place in the two years following the first world war in a context of economic crisis, high unemployment and political instability. The 1919–20 period was characterized by mass strikes, worker manifestations as well as self-management experiments through land and factory occupations. In Turin and Milan, workers councils were formed and many factory occupations took place under the leadership of anarcho-syndicalists. The agitations also extended to the agricultural areas of the Padan plain and were accompanied by peasant strikes, rural unrests and guerilla conflicts between left-wing and right-wing militias.

On 15 April 1919, the Fascists made their debut in political violence when a group of members from the Fasci di Combattimento attacked the offices of Avanti!. But they found little public support, and in the elections of November 1919, the Fascists suffered a heavy defeat, accompanied by a rapid loss of membership. In response, Mussolini moved the organization away from the left and turned the revolutionary movement into an electoral movement in 1921 named the Partito Nazionale Fascista (National Fascist Party). The party echoed the nationalist themes of D'Annunzio and rejected parliamentary democracy while still operating within it in order to destroy it. Mussolini changed his original revolutionary policies, such as moving away from anti-clericalism to supporting the Roman Catholic Church and abandoned his public opposition to the monarchy. Support for the Fascists began to grow in 1921, and pro-Fascist army officers began taking arms and vehicles from the army to use in counter-revolutionary attacks on socialists.

=== Japan ===
Because of the Anglo-Japanese Allience that Japan had signed with Great Britain in 1902, Japan was one of the Allies during the war. With British assistance, Japanese forces attacked Germany's territories in Shandong, China, including the East Asian coaling base of the Imperial German Navy. The German forces were defeated and surrendered to Japan in November 1914. The Japanese navy also succeeded in seizing several of Germany's island possessions in the western Pacific: the Carolines, the Mariana Islands, and the Marshall Islands.

At the Paris Peace Conference in 1919, Japan was granted all of Germany's pre-war rights in Shandong Province in China (despite China also being one of the Allies during the war): outright possession of the territory of Jiaozhou Bay, and favorable commercial rights throughout the rest of the province, as well as the South Seas Mandate over the German Pacific island possessions that the Imperial Japanese Navy had taken. Also, Japan was granted a permanent seat on the Council of the League of Nations. Nevertheless, the Western powers refused Japan's request for the inclusion of a "racial equality" clause as part of the Treaty of Versailles. Shandong reverted to Chinese control in 1922 after mediation by the United States during the Washington Naval Conference. Weihai followed in 1930.

=== United States ===
While disillusioned by the war, not having achieved the high ideals promised by President Woodrow Wilson, American commercial interests did finance Europe's rebuilding and reparation efforts in Germany, at least until the onset of the Great Depression. American opinion on the propriety of providing aid to Germans and Austrians was split, as evidenced by an exchange of correspondence between Edgar Gott, an executive with The Boeing Company and Charles Osner, chairman of the Committee for the Relief of Destitute Women and Children in Germany and Austria. Gott argued that relief should first go to citizens of countries that had suffered at the hands of the Central Powers, while Osner made an appeal for a more universal application of humanitarian ideals. It is also important to note that some Americans also felt that the Treaty of Versailles was too harsh towards Germany and that many were upset with France due to it defaulting on its war debts.

Shortly before this default was the Crash of 1929 which led to the Great Depression and a strengthening of Isolationism as economic issues came to the forefront. The American economic influence allowed the Great Depression to start a domino effect, pulling Europe in as well.

Following the war the United States also returned once more to a strong influence of isolationism or non interventionalism. This also effected their engagement with the League of Nations and willingness to enter the Second World War such as passing the Neutrality acts.

After the war the trend of increasing United States influence in Latin America continued. Bolivia, Colombia, Ecuador, and Peru accepted this influence and Argentina and Chile opposed it at least until 1945.

== Territorial gains and losses ==
A map with the post-war borders in red over the pre-war map of Europe. Note: this map does not show the Irish Free State.

=== Countries that gained or regained territory or independence after World War I ===
- Armenia: independence from Russian Empire and the Ottoman Empire
- Australia: gained control of German New Guinea, the Bismarck Archipelago and Nauru
- Austria: gained territories (Őrvidék) from Hungary
- Azerbaijan: independence from Russian Empire
- Belgium: gained control of Eupen-Malmedy and the African territories of Ruanda-Urundi from the German Empire
- Belarusian People's Republic: gained control of several cities from the Russian Empire
- Czechoslovakia: gained independence and territories from the Austro-Hungarian Empire, from the northern and western part gained Bohemia, Moravia, and part of Silesia and from the southern and eastern part gained mostly Upper Hungary and Carpathian Ruthenia
- Danzig: semi-autonomous free city with independence from the German Empire
- Denmark: gained Nordschleswig after the 1920 Schleswig plebiscites from the German Empire
- Estonia: independence from the Russian Empire
- Finland: independence from the Russian Empire
- France: gained Alsace-Lorraine as well as various African colonies from the German Empire, and Middle East territories from the Ottoman Empire. The African and Middle East gains were officially League of Nations Mandates.
- Georgia: independence from the Russian Empire
- Greece: gained Western Thrace from Bulgaria
- Ireland: Irish Free State (approximately five-sixths of the island) gained independence from the United Kingdom (but still part of the British Empire as a Dominion)
- Italy: gained South Tyrol, Trieste, Istria, and Zadar from the Austro-Hungarian Empire
- Japan: gained Jiaozhou Bay and most of the Shandong Peninsula from China and the South Seas Mandate (both controlled by German Empire before the war)
- Latvia: independence from the Russian Empire
- Lithuania: independence from the Russian Empire
- New Zealand: gained control of German Samoa
- Poland: recreated and gained parts of the Austrian Empire, German Empire, Russian Empire, and Hungary (small northern parts of the former Árva and Szepes counties)
- Portugal: gained control of the port of Kionga
- Romania: gained Transylvania, parts of Banat, Crișana, and Maramureș from the Kingdom of Hungary, Bukovina from the Austrian Empire, regained Dobruja from Bulgaria, and Bessarabia from the Russian Empire
- South Africa: gained control of South West Africa
- Turkey: regained control of part of Western Armenia
- Ukrainian People's Republic: gained independence from the Russian Empire and recognized by Soviet Russia in the Treaty of Brest-Litovsk
- United Kingdom: gained League of Nations Mandates in Africa and the Middle East
- Yugoslavia: created from the Kingdom of Serbia, Bosnia and Herzegovina, Kingdom of Croatia-Slavonia and gained parts from Austrian Empire (part of Duchy of Carniola, Austrian Littoral, Kingdom of Dalmatia), and Hungary (Muraköz, Muravidék, parts of Baranya, Bácska, and Banat)

=== Nations that lost territory or independence after World War I ===
- Austria: as the successor state of Cisleithania in the Austro-Hungarian Empire
- Bulgaria: lost Western Thrace to Greece, also lost a part of Pirin Macedonia and Western Outlands to Serbia (Yugoslavia)
- China: temporarily lost Jiaozhou Bay and most of Shandong to the Empire of Japan
- Germany: as the successor state of the German Empire
- Hungary: as the successor state of Transleithania in the Austro-Hungarian Empire
- Montenegro: declared union with Serbia and subsequently became incorporated into Kingdom of Serbs, Croats and Slovenes
- Russian SFSR, as the successor state of the Russian Empire
- Turkey: as the successor state of the Ottoman Empire (although it did simultaneously gain some territory from the Russian Empire in the Treaty of Kars and reverse some territorial losses in Anatolia during the Turkish War of Independence and in the South Caucasus during the invasion of Armenia)
- United Kingdom: lost most of Ireland as the Irish Free State, Egypt in 1922 and Afghanistan in 1919

== Social trauma ==
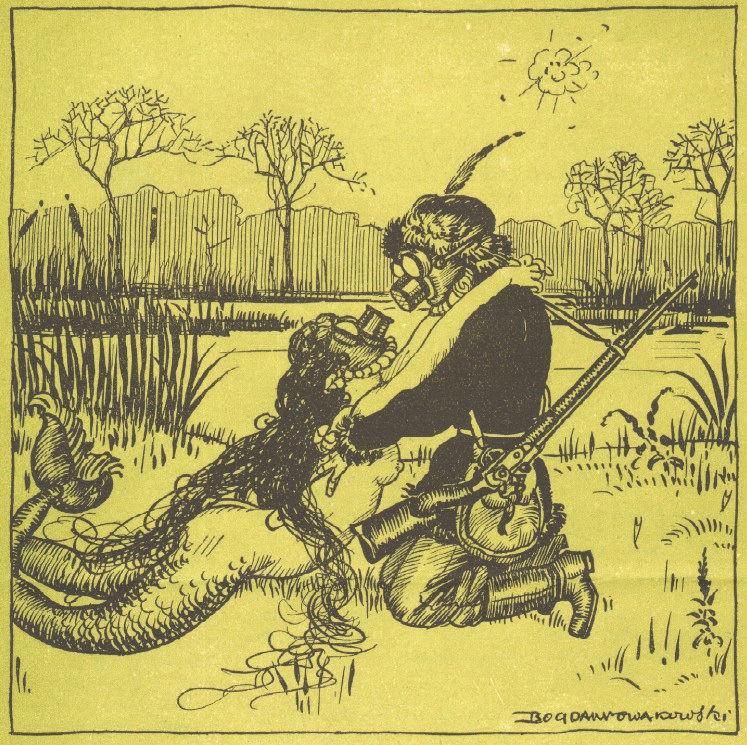
Bogdan Nowakowski's caricature titled Spring 1917 on Świteź, being a commentary on common use of gas masks during World War I. It also references one of Adam Mickiewicz's romantic ballads called Świteź.

The experiences of the war in the west are commonly assumed to have led to a sort of collective national trauma afterward for all of the participating countries. The optimism of 1900 was entirely gone and those who fought became what is known as "the Lost Generation" because they never fully recovered from their suffering. For the next few years, much of Europe mourned privately and publicly; memorials were erected in thousands of villages and towns.

So many British men of marriageable age died or were injured that the students of one girls' school were warned that only 10% would marry. The 1921 United Kingdom census found 19,803,022 women and 18,082,220 men in England and Wales, a difference of 1.72 million which newspapers called the "Surplus Two Million". In the 1921 census there were 1,209 single women aged 25 to 29 for every 1,000 men. In 1931 50% were still single, and 35% of them did not marry while still able to bear children.

As early as 1923, Stanley Baldwin recognized a new strategic reality that faced Britain in a disarmament speech. Poison gas and the aerial bombing of civilians were new developments of the First World War. The British civilian population, for many centuries, had not had any serious reason to fear invasion. So the new threat of poison gas dropped from enemy bomber aircraft excited a grossly exaggerated view of the civilian deaths that would occur on the outbreak of any future war. Baldwin expressed this in his statement that "The bomber will always get through." The traditional British policy of a balance of power in Europe no longer safeguarded the British home population.

Unlike previous wars, the First World War was the first major international conflict that had more people who died in battle than from disease.

This social trauma made itself manifest in many different ways. Some people were revolted by nationalism and what they believed it had caused, so they began to work toward a more internationalist world through organizations such as the League of Nations. Pacifism became increasingly popular. Others had the opposite reaction, feeling that only military strength could be relied upon for protection in a chaotic and inhumane world that did not respect hypothetical notions of civilization. Certainly a sense of disillusionment and cynicism became pronounced. Nihilism grew in popularity. Many people believed that the war heralded the end of the world as they had known it, including the collapse of capitalism and imperialism. Communist and socialist movements around the world drew strength from this theory, enjoying a level of popularity they had never known before. These feelings were most pronounced in areas directly or particularly harshly affected by the war, such as central Europe, Russia and France.

Artists such as Otto Dix, George Grosz, Ernst Barlach, and Käthe Kollwitz represented their experiences, or those of their society, in blunt paintings and sculpture. Similarly, authors such as Erich Maria Remarque wrote grim novels detailing their experiences. These works had a strong impact on society, causing a great deal of controversy and highlighting conflicting interpretations of the war. In Germany, German nationalists including the Nazis believed that much of this work was degenerate and undermined the cohesion of society as well as dishonoring the dead.

== Economic consequences ==
The war left allied countries overburdened with debt to the United States, and the wrecked German economy was not able to pay reparations except when loaned by American banks. Many wished to restore the gold standard despite opinions that would hurt their economies. There was an overall shift in economic power from Europe to the United States because it supplied major defense infrastructure and food to the rest of the world.

After the war, governments did not return to the policies of the First globalization, instead erecting capital controls and trade barriers, and new borders did not help. Introduced as a temporary war measure, passport control hindered economic migration and prevented equalizing labor costs in poor and developed countries, with the latter declaring their wish to abolish any restrictions but not actually wanting their workers to compete with immigrants.

The end of the first total, global war, met world industry with a massive overcapacity for military and military-related production (as well as military surpluses), such as aviation engines and stimulated research in how to adapt it to the peaceful life. For example, nitrocellulose lacquers were commercialized after it was discovered how to decrease velocity of the substance formerly produced for gunpowder. Many companies specializing in the affected industries went out of business. Some industries, such as shipbuilding, were initially flooded with reconstruction orders, e.g., to replace lost shipping, but faltered as soon as the demand returned to normal levels.

== Remains of ammunition ==
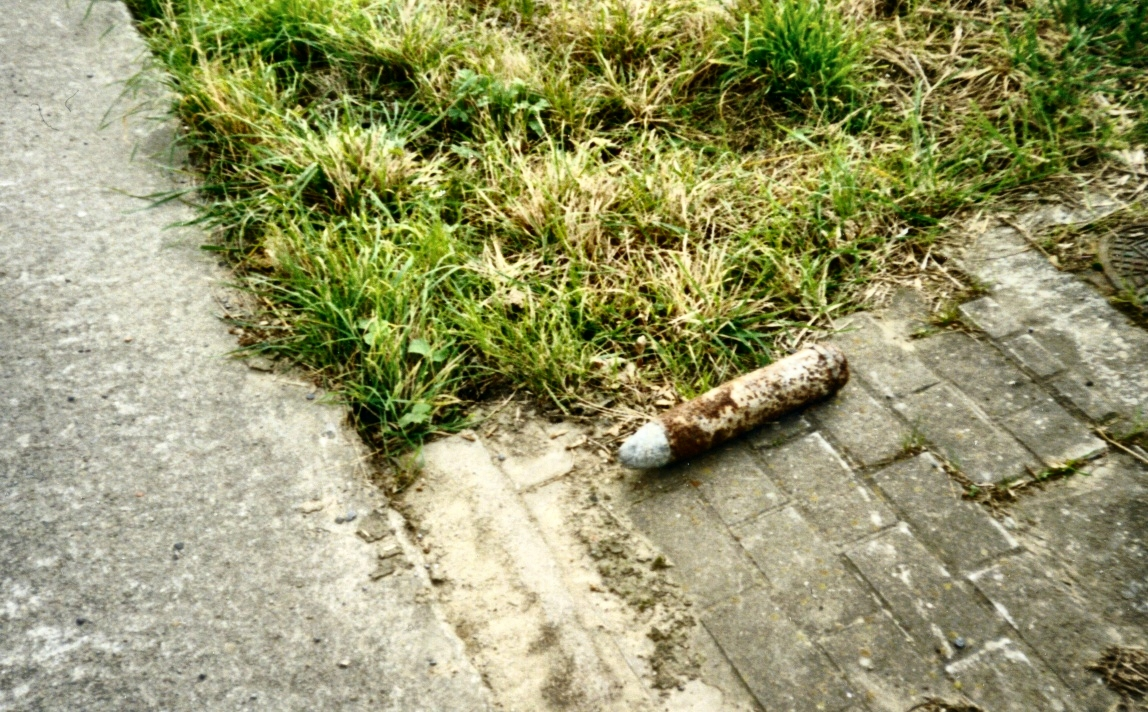
Iron harvest World War I ordnance left beside a field for disposal by the army in 2004 near Ypres in Belgium

Unexploded ordnance from the First World War remains a persistent hazard in parts of the former Western Front, especially in northern France and Belgium. Shells, grenades and other munitions are still brought to the surface by farming, construction work and erosion, a recurring phenomenon known as the iron harvest. In Belgium, the Explosive Ordnance Disposal Service (DOVO) reports an average of ten calls a day, usually concerning historical ammunition from the two world wars, and defuses more than 200 tons of ammunition each year.

The problem is also significant in France. The French civil-security demining service collects and destroys more than 450 tons of explosive devices annually across the country, and since 1945 has neutralized or destroyed 35 million shells and other explosive devices. Some munitions contain chemical agents, including mustard gas, and corroded shells may remain dangerous long after burial. A 2024 French Senate report stated that the collection and neutralization of munitions from the two world wars would require several centuries at current conditions.

== Memorials ==
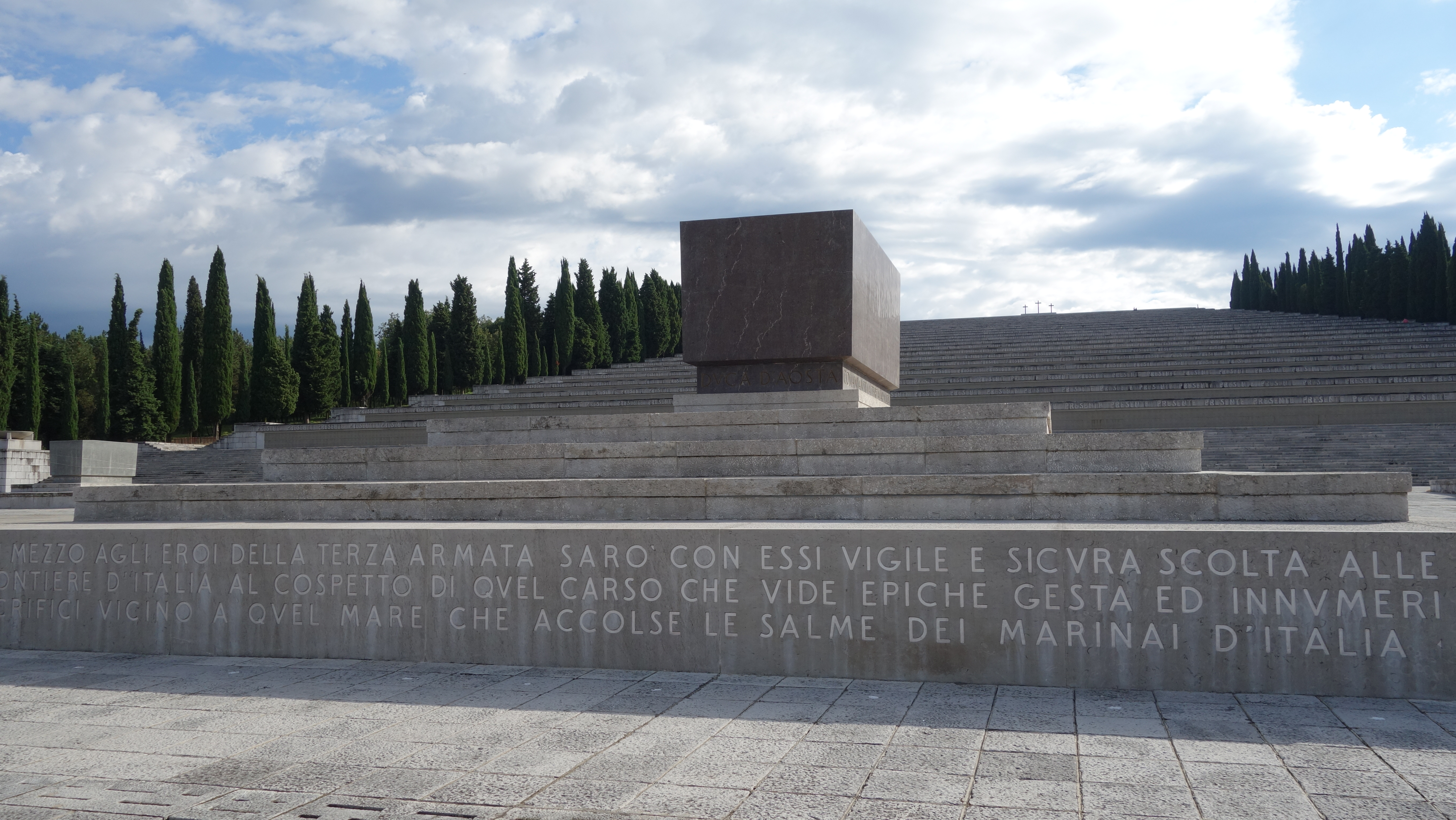
The Redipuglia War Memorial of Redipuglia, with the tomb of Prince Emanuele Filiberto, Duke of Aosta in the foreground, nicknamed the Undefeated Duke for having reported numerous victories in the First World War without ever being defeated on the battlefield. This War Memorial is the resting place of 100,187 Italian soldiers killed between 1915 and 1917 in the eleven battles fought on the Karst and Isonzo front.

=== War memorials ===
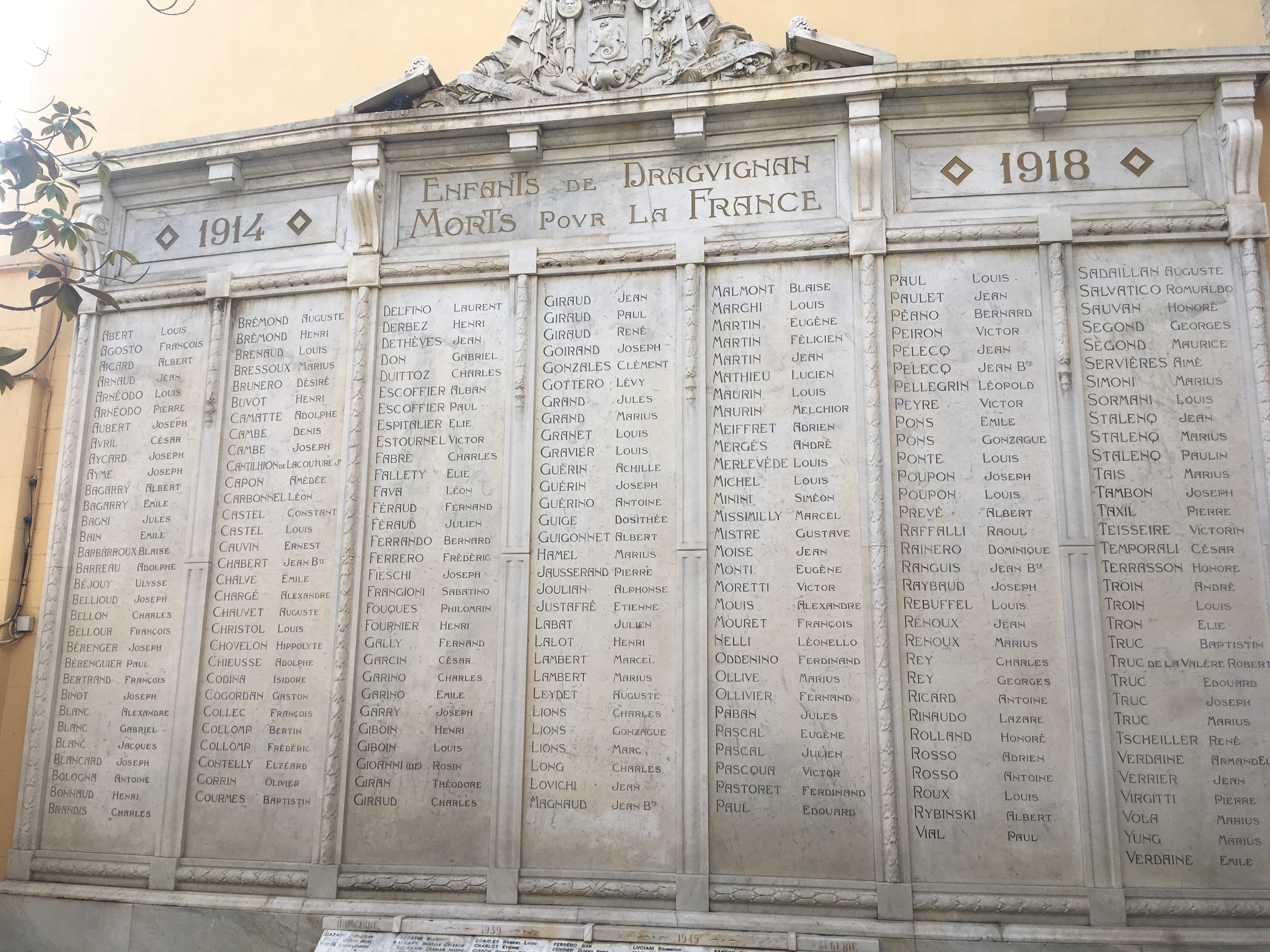
World War I memorial in Draguignan, France

Many towns in the participating countries have war memorials dedicated to local residents who died. Examples include:

- Australian War Memorial, Canberra, Australia
- Liberty Memorial, Kansas City, Missouri, United States
- Jutland Memorial Park, Thyborøn, Jutland, Denmark
- District of Columbia War Memorial, Washington, D.C., United States
- Beaumont-Hamel Newfoundland Memorial
- The Cenotaph, London, United Kingdom
- Menin Gate Memorial, Ypres, Belgium
- Thiepval Memorial
- Tyne Cot Memorial to the Missing at Passchendaele
- Verdun Memorial Museum
- Vimy Ridge Memorial, Vimy, France
- Gallipoli Memorial, Turkey
- Shrine of Remembrance, Melbourne, Australia
- Irish National War Memorial Gardens, Dublin, Ireland
- Island of Ireland Peace Park, Messines, Belgium
- National War Memorial, Ottawa, Ontario, Canada
- National War Memorial, St. John's, Newfoundland, Canada
- Kriegerdenkmal auf dem Neroberg, Wiesbaden, Hessen, Germany
- Sacrario militare di Redipuglia, Fogliano Redipuglia, Italy
- Mausoleum of Mărășești, Romania

=== Tombs of unknown soldiers ===
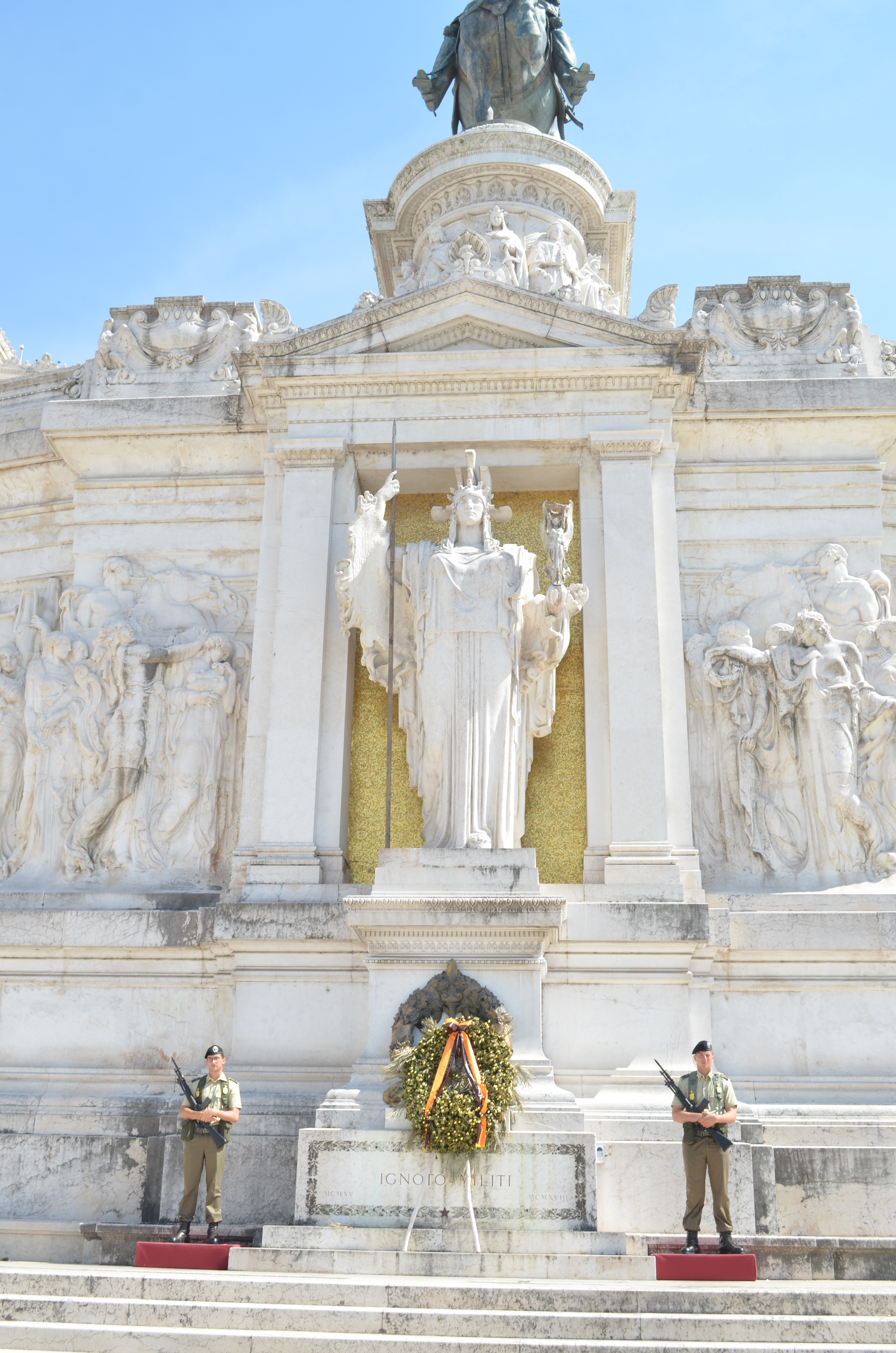
Tomb of the Italian Unknown Soldier, under the statue of goddess Roma, at Altare della Patria, Rome. Above it can be seen the equestrian statue of Victor Emmanuel II of Savoy, the first king of a unified Italy

- Monument to the Unknown Hero, Belgrade, Serbia
- Amar Jawan Jyoti, New Delhi, India
- Tomb of the Unknown Soldier, Ottawa, Ontario, Canada
- Arc de Triomphe, Paris, France
- The Tomb of the Unknown Warrior in Westminster Abbey, London, United Kingdom
- Tomb of the Unknowns, Arlington National Cemetery, Virginia, United States
- Tomba del milite ignoto, Rome, Italy
- Australian War Memorial, Canberra, Australia
- New Zealand Tomb of the Unknown Warrior, Wellington, New Zealand
- Tomb of the Unknown Soldier, Syntagma Square, Athens, Greece
- Tomb of the Unknown Soldier, Bucharest, Romania
- Tomb of the Unknown Soldier in Batalha Monastery, Batalha, Portugal
- Tomb of the Unknown Soldier, Warsaw, Poland

== See also ==
- Historiography of World War I
- International relations (1919–1939)
- Revolutions of 1917–1923
- Interwar period
- Political history of the world
- Political terror in Finland and Baltic States after World War I
- Aftermath of World War II

== Notes ==
=== Bibliography ===
- Doughty, Robert A. (2005). Pyrrhic victory: French strategy and operations in the Great War. Harvard University Press. ISBN 978-0-674-01880-8.
- Evans, Leslie (2005). Future of Iraq, Israel-Palestine Conflict, and Central Asia Weighed at International Conference. UCLA International Institute. Archived from the original on 24 May 2008.
- Gelvin, James L. (2005). The Israel-Palestine Conflict: One Hundred Years of War. Cambridge: Cambridge University Press. ISBN 978-0-521-85289-0. OCLC 59879560.
- Hooker, Richard (1996). The Ottomans. Washington State University. Archived from the original on 8 October 1999.
- Hovannisian, Richard G. (1967). Armenia on the Road to Independence, 1918. Berkeley: University of California Press. ISBN 978-0-520-00574-7.
- Isaac, Jad; Hosh, Leonardo (7–9 May 1992). Roots of the Water Conflict in the Middle East. University of Waterloo. Archived from the original on 28 September 2006.
- Kaplan, Robert D. (February 1993). "Syria: Identity Crisis". The Atlantic. Archived from the original on 24 December 2018.
- Muller, Jerry Z. (March–April 2008). "Us and Them – The Enduring Power of Ethnic Nationalism". Foreign Affairs. Council on Foreign Relations. Archived from the original on 23 June 2015.
- "Where the fighting still goes on". New-York Tribune. New York. November 9, 1919. pp. 1–86. ISSN 1941-0646. OCLC 9405688.
- Salibi, Kamal Suleiman (1993). "How it all began – A concise history of Lebanon". A House of Many Mansions – the history of Lebanon reconsidered. I.B. Tauris. ISBN 978-1-85043-091-9. OCLC 224705916. Archived from the original on 3 April 2017.
