= John Leckie (disambiguation) =

John Leckie may refer to:

- John Leckie, English music producer
- John Leckie (Australian politician), Australian politician
- John Leckie (footballer), Scottish football centre forward

== See also ==
- Leckie, a surname
- Jock Leckie, Scottish footballer
- Jack Leckie, Scottish communist activist
- Jack Leckie (footballer), English footballer
