= Leckie =

Leckie is a surname of Scottish origin. Notable people with the surname include:

- Ann Leckie
- Bill Leckie
- Campbell Leckie
- Carolyn Leckie
- Charles Leckie, Scottish footballer
- David Leckie
- Jack Leckie, Scottish communist activist
- Jack Leckie (footballer)
- James Leckie, Australian rugby union referee
- Jim Leckie, New Zealand athlete
- John Leckie
- John Leckie (Australian politician)
- John Leckie (footballer), Scottish footballer
- Mathew Leckie, Australian footballer
- Robert Leckie (author)
- Robert Leckie (aviator)
- Robert Leckie (footballer)
- Robert Gilmour Leckie, Canadian mining engineer
- Ross Leckie (Scottish writer)
- Stephen Leckie, Scottish businessman

== See also ==
- Leckie Range (disambiguation)
- Lecky
