= Lecky =

Lecky is a surname. Notable people with the surname include:

- John Lecky (1940–2003), Canadian rower
- John Lecky (rugby union, born 1863), New Zealand rugby union player
- John Lecky (rugby union, born 1960), Canadian rugby union player
- Prescott Lecky (1892–1941), American psychologist
- William Edward Hartpole Lecky (1838-1903), Anglo-Irish historian

== See also ==
- Leckie, a surname
