= Delivered from Evil =

Delivered from evil : the saga of World War II
- Author: Robert Leckie
- Subject: World War II
- Genre: history
- Publisher: Harper & Row
- Publication date: 1987
- Pages: xv, 998 pages
- ISBN: 0060158123
- OCLC: 15365134
- LC Class: D743.L43 1987

Delivered From Evil (ISBN 0060158123) is a non-fiction book about World War II which was written by Robert Leckie, an American author of popular books about the military history of the United States. Each chapter of this book is a biography, and a narrative also runs through the book. The narrative of the book is the history of World War II. The characters appear in the book as they rise to importance in the narrative.
