= Leckie Range =

Leckie Range may refer to:

- Leckie Range, Antarctica
- Leckie Range, Canada
