= First globalization =

World's first major period of globalization of trade and finance

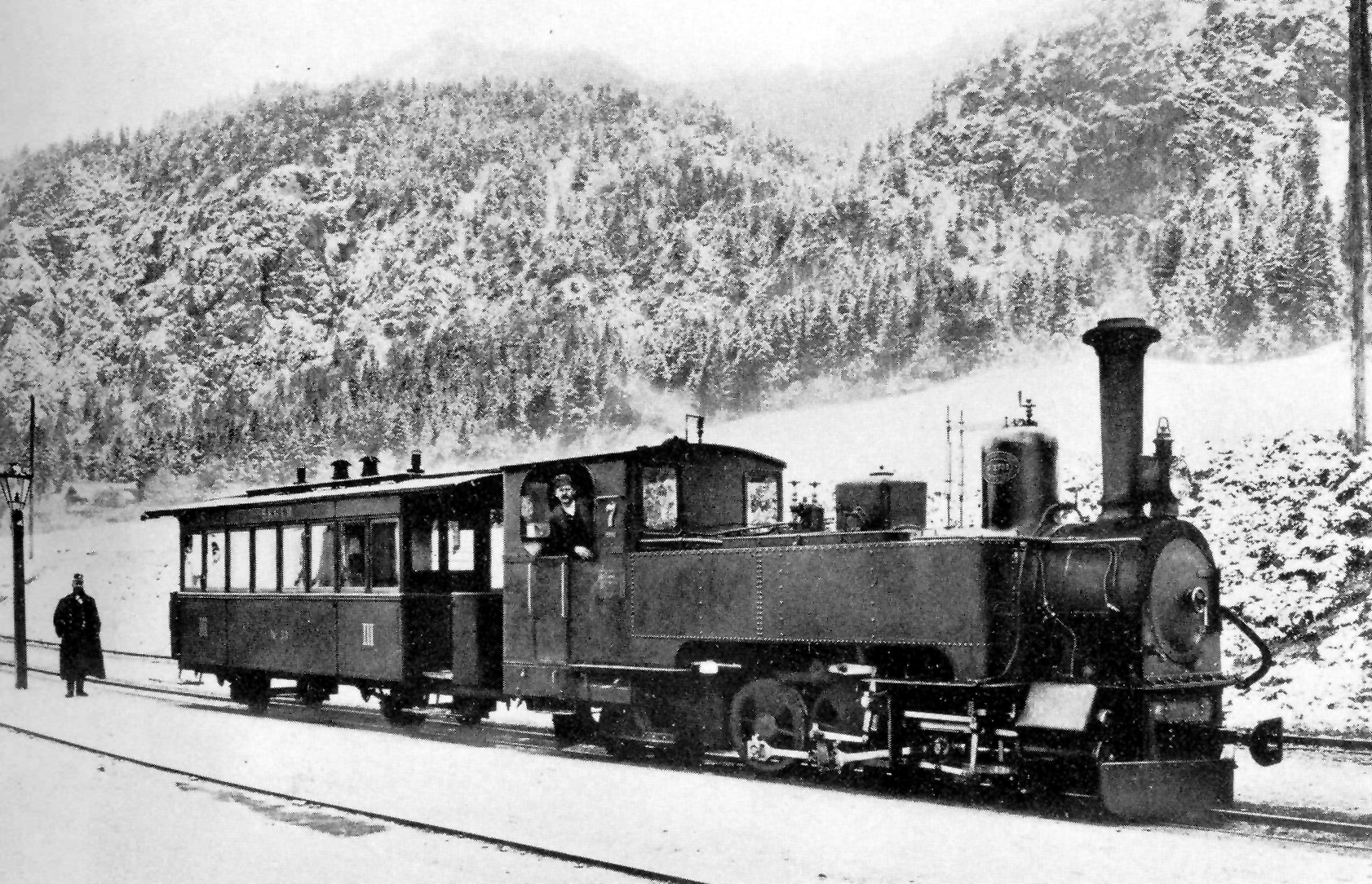
A German railway in 1895.

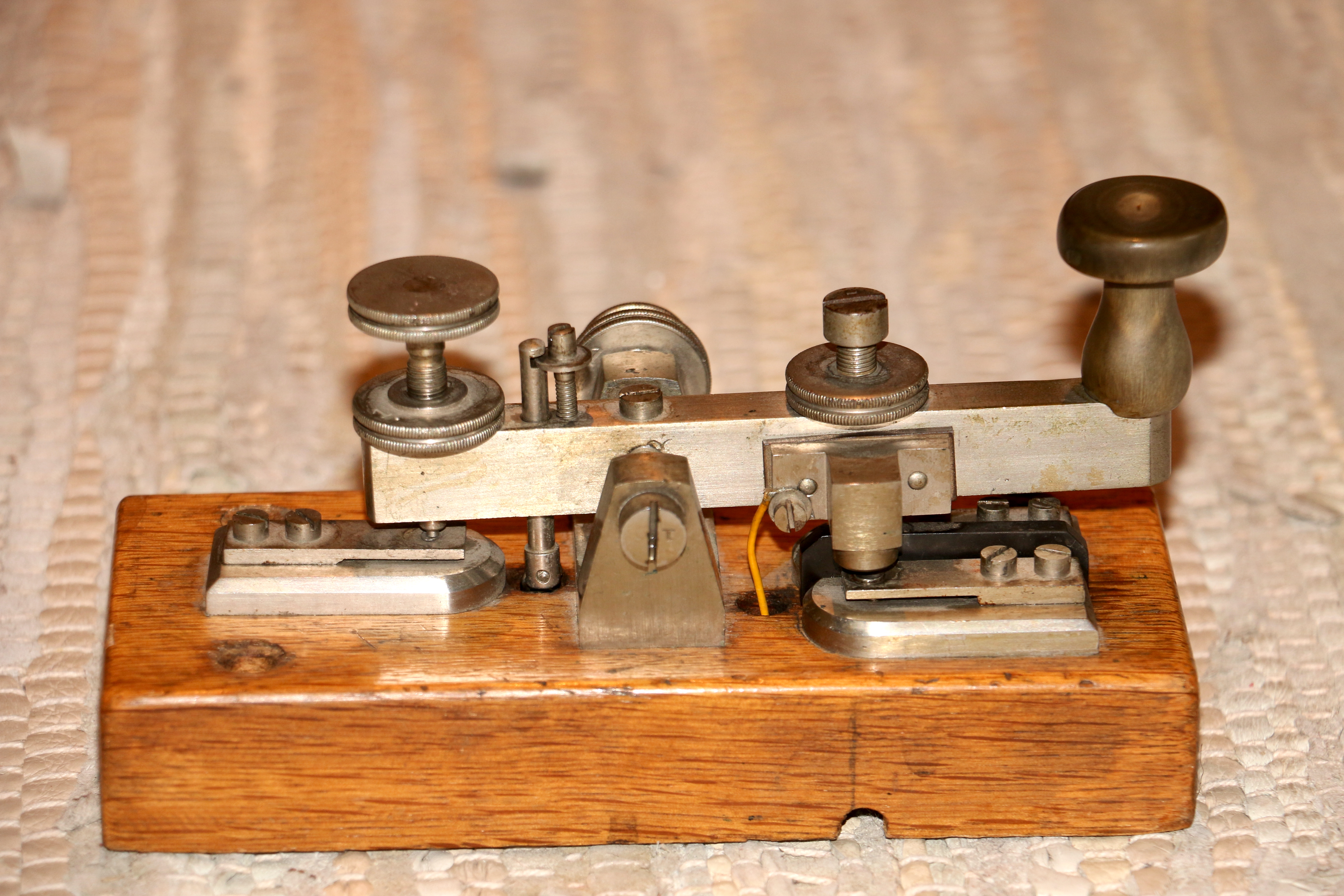
A telegraph used to emit in morse code.

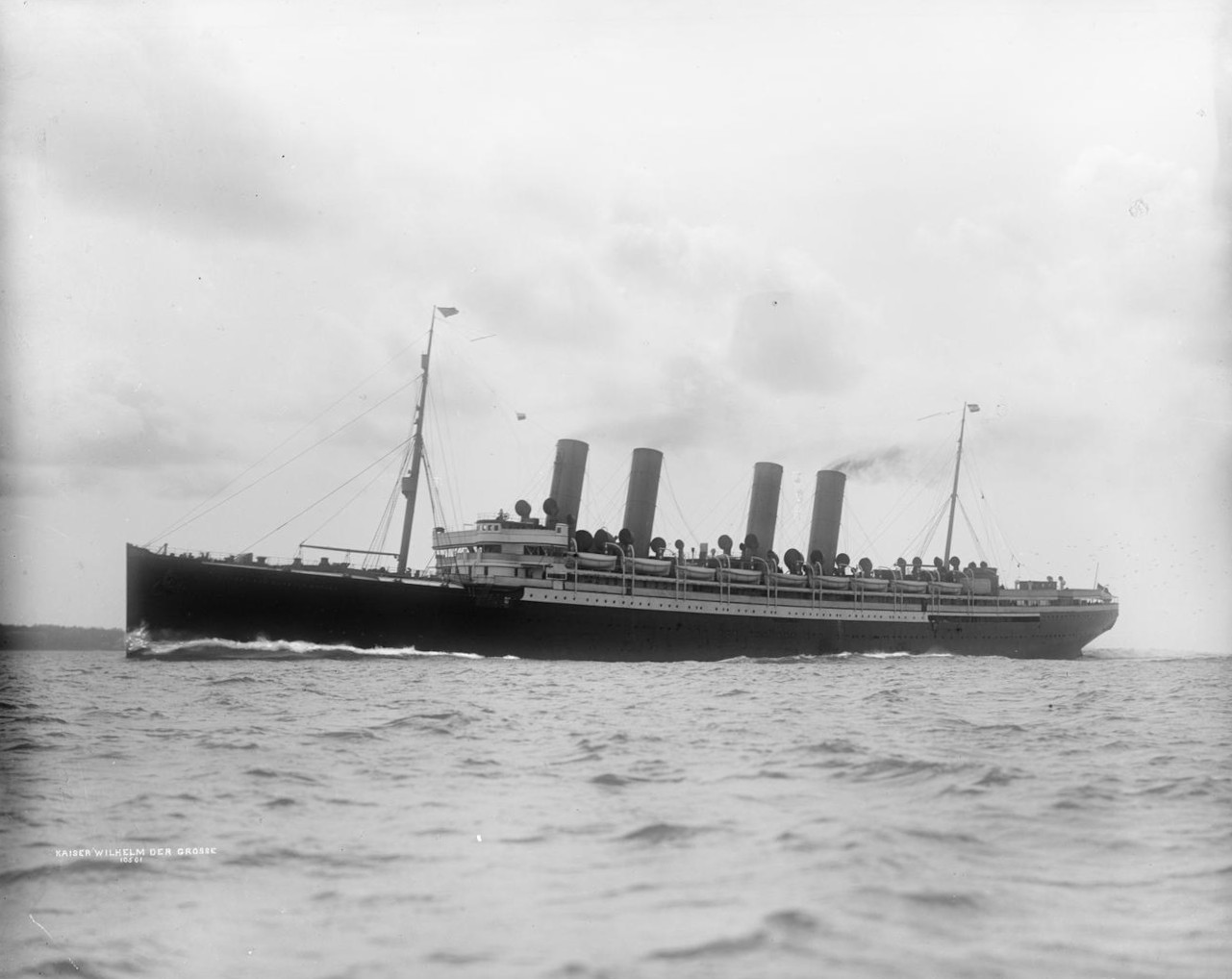
The ocean liner SS Kaiser Wilhelm der Grosse, a steamboat. As the main means of transoceanic travel for more than a century, ocean liners were essential to the transport needs of national governments, commercial enterprises and the general public.

"First globalization" is a phrase used by economists to describe the world's first major period of globalization of trade and finance, which took place between 1870 and 1914. The "second globalization" began in 1944 and ended in 1971. This led to the third era of globalization, which began in 1989 and ended around the early 2020s.

The period from 1870 to 1914 represents the peak of 19th-century globalization. First globalization is known for increasing transfers of commodities, people, capital and labour between and within continents. However, it is not only about the movement of goods or factors of production. First globalization also includes technological transfers and the rise of international cultural and scientific cooperation. The 1876 World Fair in Philadelphia was the first not to take place in Europe. The modern Olympics began in 1896. The first Nobel prizes were awarded in 1901.

International trade grew for many reasons. Constant technological improvement and increased usage associated with the decline in international freight rates. The development of railways lowered the transport costs, which resulted in a massive migration within Europe and from the Old World to the New World. Exchange-trade stability and reduction of uncertainty in trade made possible by the gold standard. Peace between main powers and reduction of trade barriers promoted trade.

1870-1914 is also known as the laissez-faire period, thus mostly liberal international policies are in place. However, the trade policies of the time lacked reciprocity.

This period saw financial crises comparable to those of the late twentieth and early twenty-first centuries and the end of the First globalisation is associated with the collapse of international trade when World War I started.

== History ==
Globalization revolves around technological and social advances, which further leads to advances in trade and cultural relativism throughout the world. Some economists claim that globalization was first started by the discovery of the Americas by Christopher Columbus. This assumption is considered false due to the mass discovery of gold and silver in mines. This discovery led to the decrease in value of silver and gold in Europe, causing inflation in the Spanish and Portuguese empires. However, the discovery of the Americas and the natives gave European traders a new source of labor between the continents, which also increased trade. This stage has not been officially deemed the "first era of globalization" because the world trade numbers were not increasing exponentially. World trade increased by 1% per year from 1500 to 1800, which further led to the first era of globalization.

Entering the 18th century, due to new technological breakthroughs world trade started to increase rapidly. The first technological advancement that contributed to this was the steam engine, introduced in the 17th century. This led to major progress in international trade among the economic powers of the world.

The invention of the steamship had a great impact on the first wave of globalization. Before its invention, trade routes were reliant on wind patterns, but steamships reduced shipping time and shipping cost. By 1850, nearly 129 countries used steamships for trade, and approximately 5,000 imports and exports were made to 5,000 cities, thus making a great impact on the world's global economy.

== Trade ==
Integration during the First globalization period can be demonstrated in many ways. The volume of international flows, the ratio of commodity trade to GDP and the cost of moving goods or factors of production across borders are a few of the measures, which help us show the increasing trade trend between 1870 and 1914. The third mentioned measure shows up in the international price gaps and for example, the price gap of wheat between Liverpool and Chicago fell from 57,6% to 15,6%, and the price gap of bacon between London and Cincinnati fell from 92,5% to 17,9%.

Many factors contributed to the growth of international trade. Falling transportation cost, reduction of trade barriers and the move to free trade in several countries are just a few of these factors. Europe was a net exporter of manufacturers and a net importer of primary products. The New World exchanged food and raw materials for European manufactured goods. This ended up being beneficial for European workers because, in the era where a large portion of income was still spent on food, cheaper transport meant cheaper food and thus higher real wages. However, it was not so beneficial for farmers. Only countries that retained agricultural free trade, like the United Kingdom, were less vulnerable to the price and rent reductions that globalization implied. Trade between industrialized economies was the prevalent form of trade before 1914.

=== Capital ===
International capital market integration was impressive during this period. By 1914, foreign assets accounted for nearly 20% of the world GDP, a figure that was not measured again until the 1970s. Europe was the main moving power. In 1914, over 87% of total foreign investment belonged to European countries. While economic institutions and policies helped with the expend of international capital integration, the absence of military conflict between main lending countries and reduction in exchange-rate risk and transaction due to the gold standard kicked off the trend.

Investment went in economies with exploitable natural resources rather than economies with cheap labour. The target was not to internationalize production but to facilitate access to raw materials, which Europe was not able to produce in great quantities. Therefore, international investment was highly concentrated. Investment mainly went into the construction of railways, land improvement, housing and other social projects that made it more pleasant for workers and beneficial for European consumers.

=== Migration ===
Migration was a large part of the First globalization. Migration rates were enormous in European countries like Italy, Greece or Ireland. Migrations were not just transoceanic, but within Europe as well. The fact that American and Australian workers earned higher wages than their European counterparts was the main reason for the mass migrations. Combined with low travel cost and liberal policies, mass migration was inevitable. However, migration had the greatest impact on the European workers living standard during the First Globalization. Lowering the labour supply pushed up real wages. On the other hand, migration hurt their counterparts overseas. Immigration in the United States lowered unskilled wages. This resulted in tightening restrictions on immigration in the main destination countries.

=== Technology ===
In Europe and the Atlantic world, technologies had been circulating for a long time and relatively freely in the late 19th century, despite laws forbidding the emigration of skilled workers and machinery exports. The decline in transport and communication costs helped the diffusion of ideas, new goods and machines. The diffusion of technologies was also supported by the creation of international scientific and technical organizations. However, science was seen as one of the weapons in the struggle between European nations. Between France and Germany, each hoped to tighten their links with allied and neutral countries, especially the United States. Later restrictive policies, aimed at import substitution, resulted in firms setting up production in foreign countries and transforming themselves into multinationals.

== Gold standard ==
The period of the First globalization saw the rise and fall of the gold standard. During the trade boom from 1870 to 1914 one country after another joined the gold standard regime, and gradually the system spread. The gold standard allows countries to convert their currencies to gold. This reduces the exchange-rate risk, transaction costs and assures potential investors that returns are reasonably safe.

The gold standard was the central pillar of the First globalization. Global financial integration collapse in the summer of 1914 saw the fall of the gold standard as well. The final collapse of the gold standard came in the 1930s.

== After 1914 ==
The beginning of World War I has associated with a collapse of global financial integration and a decline in trade. The emerging of new borders and a rise in levels of protection shot up to trade barriers that would be still rising after the end of World War I. Meanwhile, tariffs, quotas and other commercial policy barriers were on a rise. Global bodies and international conferences tried to normalize, but governments were unwilling to undo their barriers and after the Imperial Economic Conference in Ottawa in 1932, international cooperation was no longer even an illusion. Interested parties thought that the restoration of the gold standard is a goal worth pursuing. However, after a brief return between 1925 and 1929 came a collapse of the gold standard in the 1930s, which drove trade volumes even lower.
