= John Leckie (footballer) =

Scottish footballer

Personal information
- Full name: John Sinclair Leckie
- Date of birth: 19 March 1888
- Place of birth: Maryhill, Scotland
- Position: Centre forward

Senior career*
Years	Team	Apps	(Gls)
1907–1912	Queen's Park	32	(11)
- * Club domestic league appearances and goals

John Sinclair Leckie was a Scottish amateur footballer who played in the Scottish League for Queen's Park as a centre forward.

== Personal life ==
Leckie worked as a commercial traveller. In December 1916, over two years since the beginning of the First World War, Leckie enlisted in the Argyll and Sutherland Highlanders and rose to the rank of sergeant.

== Career statistics ==
Appearances and goals by club, season and competition
Club	Season	League			Scottish Cup		Other		Total	
Club	Season	Division	Apps	Goals	Apps	Goals	Apps	Goals	Apps	Goals
Queen's Park	1907–08	Scottish First Division	4	1	0	0	2 (Note: Appearance(s) in Glasgow Merchants Charity Cup)	2	6	3
Queen's Park	1908–09	Scottish First Division	14	4	1	0	2 (Note: 1 appearance and 3 goals in Glasgow Cup, 1 appearance in Glasgow Merchants Charity Cup)	3	17	7
Queen's Park	1909–10	Scottish First Division	11	5	0	0	1	0	12	6
Queen's Park	1910–11	Scottish First Division	3	1	0	0	0	0	3	1
Career total			32	11	1	0	5	5	38	16
