= Robert Leckie (author) =

United States Marine and author (1920–2001)

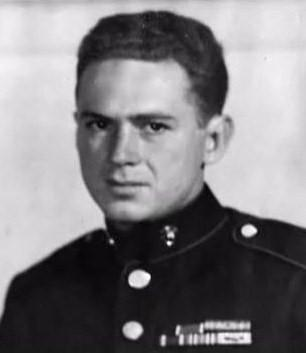
- Born: Robert Hugh Leckie; December 18, 1920; Philadelphia, Pennsylvania, U.S.
- Died: December 24, 2001 (aged 81); Byram Township, New Jersey, U.S.
- Occupations: Author; journalist
- Years active: 1940s–1999
- Military service
- Allegiance: United States
- Branch: United States Marine Corps
- Service years: 1942–1945
- Rank: Private first class
- Units: H Company, 2nd Battalion, 1st Marine Regiment, 1st Marine Division
- Conflicts: World War II; Guadalcanal campaign; Battle of Cape Gloucester; Battle of Peleliu
- Awards: Purple Heart; Navy Commendation Medal

Robert Hugh Leckie (December 18, 1920 – December 24, 2001) was an American author and journalist. After serving in the United States Marine Corps during World War II, Leckie worked as a writer and newspaperman, eventually writing more than 40 books, both non-fiction and fiction. His war memoir Helmet for My Pillow, along with Eugene B. Sledge's With the Old Breed, formed the basis for the HBO's 2010 television series The Pacific. In the series, Leckie is portrayed by James Badge Dale.

== Early life ==
Leckie was born on December 18, 1920, in Philadelphia, Pennsylvania, the youngest of eight children in an Irish Catholic family. He grew up in Rutherford, New Jersey, where he attended St. Mary High School.

== Military service ==
On January 18, 1942, Leckie enlisted in the United States Marine Corps in response to the attack on Pearl Harbor. He served in combat in the Pacific theater as a scout and a machine gunner in H Company, 2nd Battalion, 1st Marine Regiment, 1st Marine Division; among his company mates was Sidney Phillips.

Leckie saw combat in the Guadalcanal campaign, including the Battle of the Tenaru, and the Battle of Cape Gloucester in 1942–1943. He was sent on leave twice: first a prolonged stay in Melbourne, Australia, after Guadalcanal, and then a hospital stay at Naval Base Banika Island to recover from frequent nocturnal enuresis brought about by combat stress. In Melbourne, Leckie spent time in a military prison after brandishing a firearm at his commanding officer while inebriated.

During the airfield assault at the Battle of Peleliu, Leckie had to run back the opposite way to fetch a radio operator after one was killed in the assault. While searching, Leckie was caught in the ammo supply explosion, which sent him flying into a tree. Leckie suffered a blast concussion and internal wounds from this, and was evacuated to an army field hospital in the Russell Islands, never serving in combat again. He returned to the United States in March 1945, and was honorably discharged shortly thereafter. Leckie's decorations include the Purple Heart and the Navy Commendation Ribbon with a "V" device.

== Writing career ==
External videos
- Booknotes interview with Leckie on Okinawa: The Last Battle of World War II, September 4, 1995, C-SPAN

Leckie began writing professionally at age 16, working as a sports writer for The Bergen Evening Record in Hackensack, New Jersey. Following World War II, Leckie attended Fordham University but did not graduate, saying he "never liked the classroom." Instead, he worked as a reporter for the Associated Press, the Buffalo Courier-Express, the New York Journal American, the New York Daily News, and The Star-Ledger.

In 1951, Leckie was inspired to write a war memoir after seeing the musical South Pacific, saying, "I have to let people know the war wasn't a musical." The resulting memoir was his first and best-selling book, Helmet for My Pillow, published in 1957. Leckie wrote more than 40 books, with his histories spanning from the French and Indian War to Desert Storm.

== Personal life and death ==
After returning home from World War II, Leckie married his childhood friend and neighbor Vera Keller, with whom he had three children. Leckie died of Alzheimer's disease at the age of 81 at his home Byram Township, New Jersey, on December 24, 2001. He was interred at St. Joseph's Mausoleum in Newton, New Jersey. Vera died in 2024 at the age of 100.

== Bibliography ==
=== Military history ===
- March to Glory. World Publishing Co. 1960. LCCN 60011454. OCLC 2851705.
- Conflict: The History of the Korean War, 1950–53. Da Capo Press. 1996 [1962]. ISBN 0-306-80716-5.
- Strong Men Armed: The United States Marines Against Japan. Perseus Publishing. 1997 [1962 (Random House)]. ISBN 978-0-306-80785-5.
- Challenge for the Pacific: Guadalcanal, the Turning Point of the War. Doubleday. 1965. OCLC 1295146.
- Challenge for the Pacific: The Bloody Six-Month Battle of Guadalcanal. Doubleday & Company. 1968. ISBN 0-306-80911-7.
- Delivered from Evil: The Saga of World War II. Harper & Row. 1987. ISBN 0-06-015812-3.
- None Died in Vain: The Saga of the Civil War. Harper Perennial. 1990. ISBN 0-06-016280-5.
- The General. I Books. 2002 [1991]. ISBN 0-7434-4461-2.
- George Washington's War: The Saga of the American Revolution. Harper Collins. 1992. ISBN 0-06-016289-9.
- From Sea to Shining Sea: From the War of 1812 to the Mexican-American War, the Saga of America's Expansion. Harper Perennial. 1994. ISBN 0-06-016802-1.
- Okinawa: The Last Battle of World War II. Viking Press. 1995. ISBN 0-670-84716-X.
- The Wars of America: From 1600 to 1900. Harper Collins. 1998. ISBN 0-06-012571-3.
- A Few Acres of Snow: The Saga of the French and Indian Wars. Wiley & Sons. 1999. ISBN 0-471-24690-5.
- Warfare: A Study of War

=== Autobiography ===
- Helmet for My Pillow. Random House. 1957. LCCN 57010028. OCLC 2538164.
- Lord, What a Family!. Random House. 1958.

=== Catholic history ===
- These Are My Heroes: A Study of the Saints
- A Soldier-Priest Talks to Youth
- American and Catholic

=== Fiction ===
- Ordained
- Marines!. Bantam Books. 1960. LCCN 60012809.
- The Bloodborn
- Forged in Blood
- Blood of the Seventeen Fires

=== Youth books ===
- The Battle for Iwo Jima. New York: Random House. 1967. ISBN 1-59019-241-9.
- The Story of Football. Random House. 1965.
- The Story of World War Two
- The Story of World War One
- The War in Korea
- Great American Battles. Random House. 1968. LCCN 68023671. "Summary: A review of America's major wars, from the French and Indian War to the War in Korea, with emphasis on eleven important battles: Quebec, Trenton, New Orleans, Mexico City, Chancellorsville, Appomattox, Santiago, Belleau Wood, Guadalcanal, Normandy, and Pusan-Inchon."
- The World Turned Upside-Down
- 1812: The War Nobody Won
- The Big Game
- Keeper Play
- Black Treasure. Simon & Schuster. 1959. OCLC 7712167. (Sandy Steele #1, as by "Roger Barlow")
- Danger at Mormon Crossing. Simon & Schuster. 1959. OCLC 7712176. (Sandy Steele #2, as by "Roger Barlow")
- Stormy Voyage. Simon & Schuster. 1959. OCLC 40166247. (Sandy Steele #3, as by "Roger Barlow")
- Fire at Red Lake. Simon & Schuster. 1959. OCLC 7712190. (Sandy Steele #4, as by "Roger Barlow")
- Secret Mission to Alaska. Simon & Schuster. 1959. OCLC 7712190. (Sandy Steele #5, as by "Roger Barlow")
- Troubled Waters. Simon & Schuster. 1959. OCLC 7712156. (Sandy Steele #6, as by "Roger Barlow")

== See also ==
- Eugene Sledge
- Sidney Phillips
