= Part Five (The Pacific) =

- The Pacific episode
- Episode no.: Episode 5
- Directed by: Carl Franklin
- Written by: Laurence Andries; Bruce C. McKenna
- Cinematography by: Remi Adefarasin
- Editing by: Edward A. Warschilka
- Original release date: April 11, 2010
- Running time: 49 minutes

Episode chronology
← Previous "Part Four"	Next → "Part Six"

"Part Five", also known as "Peleliu Landing", is the fifth episode of the American war drama miniseries The Pacific. The episode was written by Laurence Andries and co-executive producer Bruce C. McKenna, and directed by Carl Franklin. It originally aired on HBO on April 11, 2010.

The series focuses on the United States Marine Corps's actions in the Pacific Theater of Operations within the wider Pacific War. It primarily centers on the experiences of three Marines (Robert Leckie, Eugene Sledge, and John Basilone) who were in different regiments (1st, 5th, and 7th, respectively) of the 1st Marine Division. The episode follows the Division as they prepare for their arrival at the Battle of Peleliu.

According to Nielsen Media Research, the episode was seen by an estimated 2.71 million household viewers and gained a 1.0 ratings share among adults aged 18–49. The episode received critical acclaim, with critics praising Franklin's directing and production, with many drawing comparisons to Saving Private Ryan.

== Plot ==
In June 1944, Basilone has continued in promoting war bonds with the assistance of actress Virginia Grey, with whom he has an affair. The 5th Marine Regiment arrives at Pavuvu, with Sledge accompanied by his friends Robert Oswalt and Bill Leyden. They meet their squadmates, Cape Gloucester veterans R.V. Burgin, Merriell "Snafu" Shelton, and Jay De L'eau. The veterans treat the replacements coldly, particularly Snafu who takes to mild acts of bullying and sadism.

Sledge reunites with Phillips, but Phillips informs him that he is already leaving to go back home, having won a lottery draw to do so. Sledge also eventually meets his superior, the charismatic Captain Andrew Haldane, and 1st Lieutenant Edward "Hillbilly" Jones. Sledge spends the next two weeks catching up with Phillips, who gifts Sledge a sidearm and seems to have become desensitized to his service time. Phillips is eventually called away without properly being able to say goodbye to Sledge. Despondent, Sledge takes a suggestion from him to go visit Leckie to borrow some books from him. The jaded Leckie and wide-eyed Sledge end up having a frank conversation about faith before Sledge leaves.

In September 1944, the Division moves to Peleliu, where they will fight to capture the airfield from Japan. Sledge and the 5th Regiment arrive through a Landing Vehicle Tracked at the beach, where they are struggling to make their way due to the Japanese defense. A scared Sledge barely hits land, as other soldiers of the regiment are gunned down. As they advance, Leckie and the rest of the Division arrive through a different beach. The Division struggles with the threat of a Type 95 Ha-Go light tank, forcing them to retreat. They eventually continue forward when a M4 Sherman destroys the Type 95.

In the aftermath, Sledge and Oswalt are horrified when Snafu removes gold teeth from a dead Japanese soldier. That night, Sledge and Oswalt keep guard in their area, scared over the prospect of having to continue fighting in the airfield the following day.

== Production ==
=== Development ===
The episode was written by Laurence Andries and co-executive producer Bruce C. McKenna, and directed by Carl Franklin. This was Andries' first writing credit, McKenna's third writing credit, and Franklin's first directing credit. In 2024, the episode's third script draft dated to May 11, 2006 was leaked online; at the time, the episode was to be titled "Water". The leaks also revealed that Robert Schenkkan worked on the script, being responsible for the third draft revisions.

=== Historical sources ===
The episode takes its material from both Helmet for My Pillow by Leckie and With the Old Breed by Sledge. While they knew of each other through Phillips, and Sledge would use Helmet for My Pillow and Leckie's other World War II books as historical reference when writing With the Old Breed, there is no record that the two men ever met each other.

Although Basilone and Virginia Grey did travel frequently as part of Basilone's war bonds campaign, there is no evidence to suggest that their relationship ever developed beyond a close friendship. During the 1940s, Grey was instead romantically linked with Clark Gable. Despite this, Basilone's friend Clinton Watters did confirm in interviews that Basilone did engage in several romantic flings with various women during his bonds tour and time in Camp Pendleton up until he met his eventual wife, Lena Riggi.

== Reception ==
=== Viewers ===
In its original American broadcast, "Part Five" was seen by an estimated 2.71 million household viewers with a 1.0 in the 18–49 demographics. This means that 1 percent of all households with televisions watched the episode. This was a 7% increase in viewership from the previous episode, which was watched by 2.52 million household viewers with a 0.9 in the 18-49 demographics.

=== Critical reviews ===
"Part Five" received critical acclaim. Ramsey Isler of IGN gave the episode an "amazing" 9 out of 10 and wrote, "While this isn't nearly the best episode when it comes to story and characters, this installment earns very high grades for its battle scenes. You can really see how the rumored $200 million budget was put to good use. This episode also marks a number of new things for the series. Besides the aforementioned cinematic changes, it shows the first time our marines really get in a tough skirmish with a lot of lives lost on the American side. The entire Peleliu engagement had the highest casualty rate of all the battles in the Pacific, and here we get a sense of why."

Emily St. James of The A.V. Club gave the episode an "A" grade and wrote, "After four weeks of buildup and four weeks of sporadic combat, we finally get the Saving Private Ryan moment of The Pacific. In some ways, this comparison is inevitable, since both works were shepherded to the screen by Steven Spielberg. In other ways, it feels slightly like the series is inviting the comparison as if it's daring us to compare it to one of the most famous big screen depictions of war ever filmed. The Pacific was, rather famously, one of the most expensive TV productions in history, and up until now, it's had a nice, handsome look to it, but it hasn't really put it all up there on the screen. This is The Pacific's show-me moment."

Alan Sepinwall of The Star-Ledger wrote, "Eugene Sledge is on Peleliu now, looking down into the nightmare the 1st Marine Division didn't realize it was walking into. He may not understand everything that Sid and Leckie and the rest have experienced over the past two years, but he's already starting to get a pretty clear, bleak picture." Tim Basham of Paste wrote, "Though most every episode includes battle scenes, the filmmakers continuously change our viewpoint. When the 1st Division invades Peleliu to take an airfield from the Japanese we can feel the anticipation as the troops are moved into the transports that will deliver them to the beaches."

Paul MacInnes of The Guardian wrote, "John Basilone, the hero of Guadalcanal, is stuck in the States, repeating the mantra "Back the attack" and enjoying vigorous sex with the movie star Virginia Grey. But in the encounter with his brother, it's clear he's still guilty at walking out on his fellow soldiers. It won't be long until he returns." Den of Geek wrote, "So, that episode left me pretty much applauding. Or at least the second half did. The Pacific enters the halfway stage, and after setting up the many plot strands and thematic elements, finally lets them loose as the war in the Pacific theatre becomes increasingly brutal. This is not Europe, and the traditional rules of war do not apply."

=== Accolades ===
The episode received five Primetime Creative Arts Emmy Award nominations, winning for Outstanding Sound Editing for a Limited or Anthology Series, Movie or Special and Outstanding Special Visual Effects for a Miniseries, Movie or a Special. It beat the first episode in the latter category.
