= Part One (The Pacific) =

- The Pacific episode
- Episode no.: Episode 1
- Directed by: Tim Van Patten
- Written by: Bruce C. McKenna
- Cinematography by: Remi Adefarasin
- Editing by: Edward A. Warschilka
- Original release date: March 14, 2010
- Running time: 52 minutes

Episode chronology
← Previous —	Next → "Part Two"

"Part One", also known as "Guadalcanal (Leckie)", is the series premiere of the American war drama miniseries The Pacific. The episode was written by series developer Bruce C. McKenna, and directed by supervising producer Tim Van Patten. It originally aired on HBO on March 14, 2010.

The series focuses on the United States Marine Corps's actions in the Pacific Theater of Operations within the wider Pacific War. It primarily centers on the experiences of three Marines (Robert Leckie, Eugene Sledge, and John Basilone) who were in different regiments (1st, 5th, and 7th, respectively) of the 1st Marine Division. The episode introduces the characters, with a major focus on Leckie as the Guadalcanal campaign begins.

According to Nielsen Media Research, the episode was seen by an estimated 3.08 million household viewers and gained a 1.1 ratings share among adults aged 18–49. The episode received extremely positive reviews from critics, who deemed it as a promising start for the series.

== Plot ==
In December 1941, a few weeks after the attack on Pearl Harbor, a young reporter named Robert Leckie visits his local church. As he is leaving, he runs into his neighbor and acquaintance, Vera Keller. As they catch up, Leckie reveals that he enlisted in the United States Marine Corps and offhandedly says he will write to her. Leckie later departs for boot camp in Newark, New Jersey, with his father seemingly showing more concern for his car than saying goodbye.

In American Samoa where they are stationed, Sergeants John Basilone, J.P. Morgan, and Manny Rodriguez attend a meeting with the rest of the 1st Battalion, 7th Marines held by their commander, Lieutenant Colonel Chesty Puller. Puller encourages the men to enjoy Christmas, so they dine at Basilone's family's house for the holidays, with Basilone promising his father that he will return home.

Meanwhile, in Mobile, Alabama, young Eugene Sledge is barred from enlisting as his father, Dr. Edward Sledge, Sr., detects a heart murmur. His parents also disapprove, both for his safety and because his brother, Edward Sledge, Jr., is already serving in the 741st Tank Battalion. Sledge is disappointed in himself, especially as his childhood best friend, the underaged Sidney Phillips, has received parental permission to join the Marines.

In August 1942, the Guadalcanal campaign begins. Leckie and Phillips, both part of How Company, 2nd Battalion, 1st Marines, are shipped out along with their colleagues — Wilbur "Runner" Conley, Lew "Chuckler" Juergens, Bill "Hoosier" Smith, and Ronnie Gibson — to a company commanded by Captain Jameson. Connecting with the 5th Marine Regiment, the company is ordered to protect the island’s airfield from an incoming Japanese attack, especially as U.S. naval ships leave after a major defeat at the Battle of Savo Island. That night, the company is attacked by Japanese troops in Tenaru, but the Japanese banzai charge fatally exposes them, and the Marines gun them down throughout the night with ease. A shell-shocked Jameson is relieved from his position.

Leckie is disturbed by the carnage he witnesses and other indignities committed by his company, including shooting a helpless Japanese soldier for sport, prompting Leckie to kill him to end his suffering. He starts writing letters to Vera. On September 18, the 7th Marine Regiment led by Puller arrives at Guadalcanal, with Basilone, Rodriguez, and Morgan passing Leckie’s tattered company as they march. Recognizing Puller, they exchange friendly banter with each other, but both groups quickly acknowledge that the 1st Marines are already tattered and war-weary. The company reads some letters, including one Sledge wrote to Phillips about life in Alabama. Learning that Philips turned 18 a few weeks ago, the company sings a morbid version of "Happy Birthday to You" as they enter the jungle.

== Production ==
=== Development ===
The episode was written by series developer Bruce C. McKenna, and directed by supervising producer Tim Van Patten. In 2024, the episode's fourth script draft dated to October 17, 2006 was leaked online; it revealed that Graham Yost, who would direct and co-write the fourth episode, did uncredited script revisions for the episode.

=== Historical sources ===
Leckie's experiences on Guadalcanal are taken from his memoir, Helmet for My Pillow. There is no record of Leckie and Basilone encountering each other, let alone the way they do in the episode.

Although some inspiration for Sledge's delay in entering the war was taken from Sledge's memoir, With the Old Breed, Sledge's heart murmur had nothing to do with the delay. In real life, Sledge had entered the V-12 program at Georgia Institute of Technology to appease his parents worried that he may become "cannon fodder", but he later intentionally flunked out so he could enlist in the Marines directly. This was originally supposed to be the case as shown in the 2006 script draft.

The show also exaggerates how close Leckie and Phillips were to each other in real life. While they were friendly acquaintances, they were not the close friends as depicted throughout the show due to Leckie being a gunner and Phillips being a mortarman.

== Reception ==
=== Viewers ===
In its original American broadcast, "Part One" was seen by an estimated 3.08 million household viewers with a 1.1 in the 18–49 demographics. This means that 1.1 percent of all households with televisions watched the episode.

=== Critical reviews ===
"Part One" received extremely positive reviews from critics. Ramsey Isler of IGN gave the episode a "great" 8 out of 10 and wrote, "The human story is certainly the angle this series will go for. Grand battles and heroics will take a backseat to personal stories and tragedies. Will that be enough to differentiate this series from tales that have covered similar material before? Perhaps, but it's not there yet."

Emily St. James of The A.V. Club gave the episode a "B+" grade and wrote, ""Part 1" is one of the lesser episodes of The Pacific, which is generally an excellent production all around but often seems to traffic in war movie cliche just to get things rolling. "Part 1" definitely has its share of those moments, as the world-weary intellectual comes up against the inhumanity of man and the general engages in spewing agitprop about how we're going to WIN this war, dammit, and the kid who can't go to war weeps to realize he can't. It's not to say that these scenes are bad, exactly, or that they're historically inaccurate. But you've seen them before. And you've often seen them done better."

Alan Sepinwall of The Star-Ledger wrote, "I'm hoping the picture issue was the more important one, and that therefore those of you who just watched it for the first time tonight were absorbed by this world from the jump. And if not, I strongly recommend giving Part One a second viewing if you have the time, as it'll greatly improve your appreciation going forward." Adam Bryant of TV Guide wrote, "Back before every other TV show featured a tropical locale or James Cameron created a 3-D universe called Pandora, the jungle probably did feel like another world. So it's fitting that the production team went to such great lengths in some of the opening scenes to make the overgrown jungle — the stage for much of this bloody tale — as intimidating as the encroaching Japanese enemy."

Paul MacInnes of The Guardian wrote, "Their commander, Lieutenant Colonel "Chesty" Puller, describes their task as being the following: "Marines will do battle with Japs on tiny specks of land we've never heard of." Puller's words come at an induction for his men at the end of 1941. By the following autumn the tone is less jocular." Nick Horton of Den of Geek wrote, "Much has been made of the production budget of $200+ million, and with the promotional material firmly concentrating on the scope of it, it seems apt to start with the visual aspect of things. Make no mistake, this production is huge. They've thrown most of that money up on screen, and it tells. I was lucky enough to watch it on the big screen, and it honestly looked better than some recent big-budget blockbusters I've seen."

=== Accolades ===
The episode received a Primetime Creative Arts Emmy Award nomination for Outstanding Special Visual Effects for a Miniseries, Movie or a Special. It lost to the fifth episode.
