= Part Six (The Pacific) =

- The Pacific episode
- Episode no.: Episode 6
- Directed by: Tony To
- Written by: Bruce C. McKenna; Laurence Andries; Robert Schenkkan
- Cinematography by: Remi Adefarasin
- Editing by: Edward A. Warschilka
- Original release date: April 18, 2010
- Running time: 50 minutes

Episode chronology
← Previous "Part Five"	Next → "Part Seven"

"Part Six", also known as "Peleliu Airfield", is the sixth episode of the American war drama miniseries The Pacific. The episode was written by co-executive producer Bruce C. McKenna, Laurence Andries, and co-producer Robert Schenkkan, and directed by Tony To. It originally aired on HBO on April 18, 2010.

The series focuses on the United States Marine Corps's actions in the Pacific Theater of Operations within the wider Pacific War. It primarily centers on the experiences of three Marines (Robert Leckie, Eugene Sledge, and John Basilone) who were in different regiments (1st, 5th, and 7th, respectively) of the 1st Marine Division. The episode follows the Marines as they prepare to take the Peleliu airfield.

According to Nielsen Media Research, the episode was seen by an estimated 2.38 million household viewers and gained a 0.8 ratings share among adults aged 18–49. The episode received critical acclaim, with critics praising the performances, directing, writing and pacing.

== Plot ==
In September 1944, Phillips returns to Mobile, Alabama, where he informs Sledge's family of his actions in the battlefield. To comfort them, he lies by claiming that Sledge is not in danger and that he is safe. In Peleliu, the Division is struggling to focus due to the limited supplies and poor conditions of the area.

The Marines fight their way through the airfield to capture it, which proves to be incredibly difficult due to the heavy gunfire. Leckie helps an injured Runner through the airfield, but Runner receives another gunshot to the arm. To complicate matters, the man in charge of the radio is killed, so Leckie is assigned to recross the airfield to get a new radio to find a corpsman. As he desperately tries to find one, he is hit by a blast concussion. Back in the airfield, the Marines manage to overcome the Japanese despite the heavy losses. Many soldiers, Leckie included, are sent to a hospital ship.

Sledge talks with Haldane, questioning their role in the war. Haldane claims that everyone can be scared, as they believe in the same righteous cause. Later, Haldane declares that he will leave his position, instructed to serve in another battle, having failed in convincing his superiors in changing orders. At the hospital ship, Leckie reunites with Runner, and both wonder the fate of their friends back at Peleliu. They stare at the island from the deck, prepared to go back home.

== Production ==
=== Development ===
The episode was written by co-executive producer Bruce C. McKenna, Laurence Andries, and co-producer Robert Schenkkan, and directed by Tony To. This was McKenna's fourth writing credit, Andries' second writing credit, Schenkkan's second writing credit, and To's first directing credit. In 2024, the episode's third script draft dated to July 10, 2006 was leaked online; at the time, the episode was to be titled "The Umurbrogol Hills", a reference to the official name of the fabled "Bloody Nose Ridge".

=== Historical sources ===
The episode takes its material from both Helmet for My Pillow by Leckie and With the Old Breed by Sledge.

== Reception ==
=== Viewers ===
In its original American broadcast, "Part Six" was seen by an estimated 2.38 million household viewers with a 0.8 in the 18–49 demographics. This means that 0.8 percent of all households with televisions watched the episode. This was a 13% decrease in viewership from the previous episode, which was watched by 2.71 million household viewers with a 1.0 in the 18-49 demographics.

=== Critical reviews ===
"Part Six" received critical acclaim. Ramsey Isler of IGN gave the episode a "good" 7.9 out of 10 and wrote, "Overall, it's still a good bit of TV, but it was definitely carried by the battle scenes. So far we've had episodes that focused on story, and episodes that focused on battle, but we've yet to see one that nicely balanced both."

Emily St. James of The A.V. Club gave the episode an "A" grade and wrote, "'Part 6' of The Pacific is maybe the miniseries' most harrowing hour yet. Roughly the first two-thirds of it are dedicated to a grueling charge to take bombed out facilities and oust Japanese soldiers from them, to better establish a beachhead on the godforsaken rock of Peleliu. With Sledge and Leckie as our constants, the hour lays out exactly why these facilities are desirable and how they're going to be taken with a minimum of fuss and then gets down to the business of sending the men in to take them."

Alan Sepinwall of The Star-Ledger wrote, "If you go into a battle as horrible as the one on Peleliu, you don't always have a choice about where you have to go and what obstacles you have to get past. But if you're able to keep your wits about you, and are very lucky indeed, maybe you can make it to the other side in one piece." Tim Basham of Paste wrote, "It wouldn't be unusual, and even a little understandable, for viewers of The Pacific to change channels during the HBO series' graphic battle scenes, with their vivid reenactments of Marines being torn apart by enemy fire. Detached limbs, gaping wounds and copious amounts of blood can take a psychological toll. But that's the point — by taking us as close to the events as possible, short of actually being there, we better understand the emotional impact the battles are having on the men."

Paul MacInnes of The Guardian wrote, "The week's final scene sees a recuperating Leckie reunited with pal Wilbur Conley. Both had thought the other was dead. They sit, consoling each other that they are, for that moment, safe. Meanwhile in the distance, Peleliu goes up in smoke. So that was the show and, as some commenters have forewarned, I think it's getting better as time goes on." Den of Geek wrote, "Episode Six of The Pacific is a transition episode. Sledge is now the hero, and Leckie's war looks over. I will miss him, but, no doubt, this isn't the last we've seen of him. Meanwhile, I look forward to Sledge's increasingly brutal fight of Peleliu and the return of John Basilone."
