= Part Four (The Pacific) =

- The Pacific episode
- Episode no.: Episode 4
- Directed by: Graham Yost
- Written by: Robert Schenkkan; Graham Yost
- Cinematography by: Stephen F. Windon
- Editing by: Alan Cody
- Original release date: April 4, 2010
- Running time: 54 minutes

Episode chronology
← Previous "Part Three"	Next → "Part Five"

"Part Four", also known as "Cape Gloucester, Pavuvu, Banika", is the fourth episode of the American war drama miniseries The Pacific. The episode was written by co-producer Robert Schenkkan and co-executive producer Graham Yost, and directed by Yost. It originally aired on HBO on April 4, 2010.

The series focuses on the United States Marine Corps's actions in the Pacific Theater of Operations within the wider Pacific War. It primarily centers on the experiences of three Marines (Robert Leckie, Eugene Sledge, and John Basilone) who were in different regiments (1st, 5th, and 7th, respectively) of the 1st Marine Division. The episode follows the Division's role in the Battle of Cape Gloucester, and its aftermath in the soldiers' mental state.

According to Nielsen Media Research, the episode was seen by an estimated 2.52 million household viewers and gained a 0.9 ratings share among adults aged 18–49. The episode received near critical acclaim, with critics praising the directing, writing, performances and themes.

== Plot ==
In December 1943, Sledge is enlisted in the Marines, training at Camp Elliott in San Diego County, California. During this, the 1st Marine Division arrives at Cape Gloucester, where they will attempt to capture the airfields taken by the Japanese.

At night, the Division fends off soldiers from the 17th Division for control of the land. While they win their battle, the relentless rain and jungle environment takes its toll on the Marines, especially Leckie. He starts feeling frustrated with the lack of progress in the operation, as well as the poor conditions of the jungle. He is further disturbed when Gibson coldly strangles a wounded Japanese soldier to death, while a fellow soldier gets naked and commits suicide in the jungle. Leckie is also demoted when he accuses an officer of stealing his items.

In May 1944, the unit arrives at Pavuvu, which will serve as a temporary base. Many soldiers start feeling sick, with Leckie himself diagnosed with nocturnal enuresis. Leckie is instructed to go to a naval hospital on Banika to seek further treatment. There, he discovers that Gibson has been placed at a ward section. Gibson reveals that he was sent there after trying to steal a plane to return to America, lamenting that his military career is over. Leckie decides to leave the hospital, bribing his doctor with a Japanese pistol he acquired to get released. Before returning with his unit, Leckie visits Gibson to give him cigarettes and consoling him over his fate.

== Production ==
=== Development ===
The episode was written by co-producer Robert Schenkkan and co-executive producer Graham Yost, and directed by Yost. This was Schenkkan's first writing credit, Yost's first writing credit, and Yost's first directing credit. In 2024, the episode's third script draft dated to July 10, 2006 was leaked online; at the time, the episode was to be titled "Islands". The leaks also revealed that Bruce McKenna had written the episode's initial drafts before Schenkkan took over as writer. Much of the draft's initial content would also be pushed over to the series' fifth episode.

=== Historical sources ===
The episode is based on Leckie's memoir Helmet for My Pillow. The character of Gibson is based on "The Kid", an anonymous Marine whose murdering of a soldier and imprisonment are detailed as such. The main differences are that Sidney Phillips did not witness the murder alongside Leckie, and Leckie gifted the Kid candy when departing Banika rather than cigarettes. Meanwhile, the character of Lebec and his suicide are fictional additions by the show. Omitted parts of the book from the show include an Australian guide dubbed "The Digger" and Leckie's interactions with island natives.

== Reception ==
=== Viewers ===
In its original American broadcast, "Part Four" was seen by an estimated 2.52 million household viewers with a 0.9 in the 18–49 demographics. This means that 0.9 percent of all households with televisions watched the episode. This was a 10% decrease in viewership from the previous episode, which was watched by 2.77 million household viewers with a 1.0 in the 18-49 demographics.

=== Critical reviews ===
"Part Four" received near critical acclaim. Ramsey Isler of IGN gave the episode an "amazing" 9 out of 10 and wrote, "Budge's timid yet disturbing demeanor and dialogue delivery made me wish he had a bigger role in this episode. Still, the end result is a haunting story that leaves an impression and perhaps foreshadows some events to come."

Emily St. James of The A.V. Club gave the episode a "B+" grade and wrote, "It's an episode that seeps down and gets under your skin, like that hammering rain, and it provides the best sense yet of just how little these men could be individuals in the face of both war and the very forces of nature itself."

Alan Sepinwall of The Star-Ledger wrote, "Ultimately, Leckie just needs a respite from the front, where Gibson appears irreparably broken, but watching this episode, it's not hard to understand how this could have happened to either of them, or so many other men like them." Tim Basham of Paste wrote, "The vacant stares, the on-the-brink-of-madness smiles. Leckie, with each successive hardship, moves to another level of hardness. And you wonder how he’ll ever survive the rest of the war."

Paul MacInnes of The Guardian wrote, "Whatever the reason, this episode was several degrees more interesting than those that preceded it. I note it was both written and directed by Graham Yost. Quite how much freedom each writer is granted to embellish on the characters is unclear, but Yost certainly appears to have broken from the flat, almost documenty style with which the series began." Den of Geek wrote, "I remain convinced that The Pacific is an important work for today’s television viewer, especially in light of our recent collective experiences with war. Anyone believing that soldiering is or was a noble business should watch this."
