= Part Three (The Pacific) =

- The Pacific episode
- Episode no.: Episode 3
- Directed by: Jeremy Podeswa
- Written by: George Pelecanos; Michelle Ashford
- Cinematography by: Stephen F. Windon
- Editing by: Alan Cody
- Original release date: March 28, 2010
- Running time: 61 minutes

Episode chronology
← Previous "Part Two"	Next → "Part Four"

"Part Three", also known as "Melbourne", is the third episode of the American war drama miniseries The Pacific. The episode was written by co-producer George Pelecanos and Michelle Ashford, and directed by Jeremy Podeswa. It originally aired on HBO on March 28, 2010.

The series focuses on the United States Marine Corps's actions in the Pacific Theater of Operations within the wider Pacific War. It primarily centers on the experiences of three Marines (Robert Leckie, Eugene Sledge, and John Basilone) who were in different regiments (1st, 5th, and 7th, respectively) of the 1st Marine Division. The episode follows the Division as they rest in Melbourne, Australia while awaiting new instructions for their next assignment.

According to Nielsen Media Research, the episode was seen by an estimated 2.77 million household viewers and gained a 1.1 ratings share among adults aged 18–49. The episode received extremely positive reviews from critics, who praised the change in tone and focus on character development in contrast to previous episodes.

== Plot ==
In January 1943, the 1st Marine Division arrives in Melbourne, Australia, where they are welcomed as heroes by the citizens. While they are instructed to stay at a cricket stadium to rest, most of the division goes AWOL into Melbourne when the military police make no attempt to stop them. At a pub, Basilone and Morgan get into a fight with an Australian soldier after the latter mocks them and Rodriguez’s death. The next day, a hungover and bruised Basilone learns from Chesty Puller that he will receive the Medal of Honor.

Wandering through the city, a drunk Leckie catches the interest of a woman boarding a tram; he follows and meets the woman, Stella Karamanlis, who gives him her address. He visits her house, meeting her Greek Australian family and having a friendly talk with her parents, who had fled to Australia to escape the Turkish capture of Smyrna, over dinner. They invite him to stay at their home in exchange for some help at the house, which he accepts. That night, Leckie and Stella have sex. In subsequent days, Leckie and Stella grow closer, and he attends a funeral service for a friend of Stella’s from the neighborhood who died in combat.

At the stadium, Basilone is honored with the Medal of Honor for his actions at Guadalcanal. Later, Puller informs Basilone that he is headed back to the U.S. to sell war bonds. When Leckie returns to the stadium, their unit is instructed to board a train for an exercise where they must walk 100 miles back to the stadium with very limited resources. After three exhausting days of walking, they finally reach the stadium again.

When Leckie visits Stella again, she tells him not to return and ends their relationship; while she loves him, she is concerned over the idea of his death and she cannot handle that possibility. An upset Leckie gets drunk and returns to the stadium, where his friend Lew Juergens asks to temporarily relieve him on guard duty so he can urinate. Caught by their commanding officer, the drunk and irate Leckie pulls a sidearm on him, causing Leckie and Juergens to be arrested. For their actions, Leckie and Juergens are punished, with Leckie receiving a demotion and reassignment to the battalion’s intelligence unit. Soon after the company receives their next orders, Phillips loses his virginity to a young woman he had met his first night in Melbourne. Basilone says goodbye to Morgan and boards a plane to return to America. The following day, the company leaves Melbourne, while Basilone arrives in San Francisco.

== Production ==
=== Development ===
The episode was written by co-producer George Pelecanos and Michelle Ashford, and directed by Jeremy Podeswa. This was Pelecanos' first writing credit, Ashford's first writing credit, and Podeswa's first directing credit. In 2024, the episode's third script draft dated to May 11, 2006 was leaked online; at the time, the episode was to be titled "Glory Bound".

=== Historical sources ===
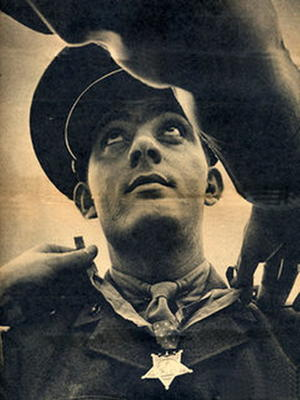
The real Basilone receiving the Medal of Honor

Leckie's experiences on leave are loosely based on those described in Helmet for My Pillow. The character of Stella is a composite character based on numerous flings Leckie had in Melbourne, one of whom - dubbed the "Drink Waitress" in Helmet for My Pillow - makes an unrelated cameo appearance (played by Cassandra Magrath) offering drinks to Basilone and Morgan, where her character is named Helen. While Leckie's and Juergens' sentencing to military prison for drunkenly pulling a handgun on a superior did happen, the circumstances had nothing to do with Leckie's love life and were instead the pinnacle of numerous confrontations between Leckie and his superior.

The character of Gwen, whom Phillips becomes romantically involved with, is based on a teenager named Shirley Osborne that the real Phillips befriended, although according to Phillips the two never consummated their relationship. Ten years after the war, the two would reunite when Osborne visited Mobile, with Osborne's son later marrying Phillips' daughter.

The episode depicts both the 1st and 7th Marine Regiments being quartered at the Melbourne Cricket Ground. In real life, only the 1st resided there, while the 7th resided in several suburbs in the southeast area of the city. Basilone's Medal of Honor ceremony also happened there rather than at the Melbourne Cricket Ground.

== Reception ==
=== Viewers ===
In its original American broadcast, "Part Three" was seen by an estimated 2.77 million household viewers with a 1.1 in the 18–49 demographics. This means that 1.1 percent of all households with televisions watched the episode. This was a slight decrease in viewership from the previous episode, which was watched by 2.79 million household viewers with a 1.0 in the 18-49 demographics.

=== Critical reviews ===
"Part Three" received extremely positive reviews from critics. Ramsey Isler of IGN gave the episode a "great" 8 out of 10 and wrote, "In general, this story went a long way towards fleshing out the cast and putting their wartime lives into perspective. It may be a bit of an oddity as an episode in a war series without a single scene of battle or a battlefield, but it earns high marks nonetheless."

Emily St. James of The A.V. Club gave the episode an "A–" grade and wrote, "Leckie and Stella may long for their own version of the domestic bliss that her parents have (a bliss that's in marked contrast to what Leckie says about his own family), but to get it, they will have to wade through another few years of hell. You can work to preserve a thing, you can even fight to preserve it, but at any given time, the fight can bump up against that which you work to save. That this episode drives that lesson home reminds us of the stakes involved for all of these young men."

Alan Sepinwall of The Star-Ledger wrote, "Because we spent so much time on combat in the first two hours, Part Three provides some much-needed characterization not only of Leckie, but of Basilone. Episodes like this one are essential for keeping our investment in the hours that are largely about action, particularly since there are only three characters to zero in on, and one of them's headed back to the States for the forseeable [sic] future." Ken Tucker of Entertainment Weekly wrote, "The horrors and exhaustion of Guadalcanal just barely put aside yet always in the back of their minds, the men found an awful lot of appreciative Aussies awaiting them."

Paul MacInnes of The Guardian wrote, "After a not-entirely-refreshing night's sleep on the terraces of a cricket ground the mood changes. Energy partially restored, the marines gather their forces to hit the town, hit on girls and punch resentful locals." Den of Geek wrote, "I was glad that this week was able to give me time to get to know the characters a little better, and understand what makes them tick and how they deal with what life has thrown at them."

=== Accolades ===
The episode was nominated for the Primetime Emmy Award for Outstanding Costumes for a Miniseries, Movie, or Special. It lost to the second episode of Return to Cranford.
