= Part Two (The Pacific) =

- The Pacific episode
- Episode no.: Episode 2
- Directed by: David Nutter
- Written by: Bruce C. McKenna
- Cinematography by: Remi Adefarasin
- Editing by: Alan Cody; Marta Evry
- Original release date: March 21, 2010
- Running time: 55 minutes

Episode chronology
← Previous "Part One"	Next → "Part Three"

"Part Two", also known as "Guadalcanal (Basilone)", is the second episode of the American war drama miniseries The Pacific. The episode was written by series developer Bruce C. McKenna, and directed by David Nutter. It originally aired on HBO on March 21, 2010.

The series focuses on the United States Marine Corps's actions in the Pacific Theater of Operations within the wider Pacific War. It primarily centers on the experiences of three Marines (Robert Leckie, Eugene Sledge, and John Basilone) who were in different regiments (1st, 5th, and 7th, respectively) of the 1st Marine Division. The episode follows the Division's stand during the Battle for Henderson Field.

According to Nielsen Media Research, the episode was seen by an estimated 2.79 million household viewers and gained a 1.0 ratings share among adults aged 18–49. The episode received extremely positive reviews from critics, who praised the battle sequences and Nutter's directing.

== Plot ==
In October 1942, the 7th Marine Regiment lands on Guadalcanal. Basilone, Rodriguez, and Morgan are among its soldiers, tasked with scouting the jungle for Japanese forces as they await for instructions. After their lieutenant is killed, the group rendezvous with the 1st Marine Division, where they learn from Chesty Puller that the division must prepare for a defense of a possible Japanese ambush with the limited supplies they have on hand. Puller also informs them of an Army landing on the beach, causing Leckie, Basilone, and many other Marines to loot supplies from crates during a Japanese air raid.

That night, the Marines are shelled by the Japanese, burying many Marines in their air raid shelters. The next morning, they are instructed to protect a route to the airfield from the encroaching Japanese. Puller also requests Basilone release Rodriguez to be a supply runner for the division during the defense. That night, Puller learns from a scout that the bulk of the Japanese ground forces are headed toward Basilone’s company, who open up on the onrushing enemy. After learning that Morgan’s position has nearly been overwhelmed, Basilone relocates his machine gun to stop the advance, suffering severe burns to his arms while cradling the hot barrel. Despite his injuries, Basilone continues fighting, killing scores of Japanese troops. The following morning, Basilone searches the jungle and discovers Rodriguez has been killed.

In Mobile, Sledge tells his father that he is enlisting despite his heart murmur. His father expresses concern for the kind of man his son will become when he witnesses the horrors of war, recalling the pain of the World War I survivors he treated. As the unit prepares to leave the island, Basilone wonders if any small deviation on Rodriguez’s route could have prevented his death. Leckie and his company board a Navy ship and drink coffee for the first time in weeks. They are astounded to discover they are seen as war heroes back home, their campaign on Guadalcanal followed closely by American newspapers.

== Production ==
=== Development ===
The episode was written by series developer Bruce C. McKenna, and directed by David Nutter. This was McKenna's second writing credit, and Nutter's first directing credit. In 2024, the episode's third script draft dated to May 11, 2006 was leaked online; at the time, the episode was to be titled "Sacraments".

=== Historical sources ===
The episode is based primarily on eyewitness accounts of Basilone's heroics at Guadalcanal. The fate of Rodriguez - a composite character based on other friends of Basilone and Morgan - is taken from Hugh Ambrose's book The Pacific, although his death takes place later in the campaign.

== Reception ==
=== Viewers ===
In its original American broadcast, "Part Two" was seen by an estimated 2.79 million household viewers with a 1.0 in the 18–49 demographics. This means that 1 percent of all households with televisions watched the episode. This was a 10% decrease in viewership from the previous episode, which was watched by 3.08 million household viewers with a 1.1 in the 18-49 demographics.

=== Critical reviews ===
"Part Two" received extremely positive reviews from critics. Ramsey Isler of IGN gave the episode a "great" 8.2 out of 10 and wrote, "In every technical sense, this episode series is brilliant. Each scene is portrayed well, with crisp cinematography and directing. While the series doesn't really ask much of its cast, the actors do their jobs well. It doesn't feel as if any of them are acting. They're totally believable as the characters they portray. The problem is we've seen this all before in every genre from movies, to TV, even video games. This is certainly a well-told story, but it's a story we already know, unfortunately, and that takes away some of the impact."

Emily St. James of The A.V. Club gave the episode a "B+" grade and wrote, "Instead of taking the Band of Brothers approach of slowly ramping us up to the point where we know all of the characters before they're dropped into hell, The Pacific just drops us into hell right away with them and expects us to keep up. The first two hours of this show don't do a whole lot to distinguish our central threesome - Sledge, Leckie and Basilone - beyond the very broadest of strokes." Ken Tucker of Entertainment Weekly wrote, "This may be one of the few TV shows now on the air to suggest that fame is empty, fleeting. As such, quite aside from its value as dramatized history, The Pacific can serve as an antidote to an awful lot of television that’s addicted to empty fame."

Alan Sepinwall of The Star-Ledger wrote, "Leckie and his buddies are tired and filthy and so very, very much older than they were when they landed a few months before, and they're not sure how to react to being considered heroes when they were just barely holding on half the time. But you can also see that the word means something to them - that their sacrifices, and the ultimate sacrifices of the comrades who didn't make it off Guadalcanal alive, weren't happening in a vacuum. People in 1942 knew of the heroism of the 1st Marines and now, 68 years later, they know it again." Adam Bryant of TV Guide wrote, "With most of the scene-setting taken care of in Part 1, this hour is devoted to much more action."

Paul MacInnes of The Guardian wrote, "Some head to a new posting on the island, others (Leckie's band) are taken back to a carrier ship where they are informed, in the show's final needlessly saccharine exchange, that they are heroes to the people back home." Nick Horton of Den of Geek wrote, "All in all, the opening two episodes of The Pacific are blockbuster television, and utterly compelling. I could have happily sat in the auditorium and watched the entire 10 hour series in one go. As long as the characters are not lost amongst the visuals, then this could even be more successful Band Of Brothers."

=== Accolades ===
The episode won the Primetime Emmy Award for Outstanding Sound Mixing for a Miniseries or a Movie, beating out three other episodes of The Pacific in the process.
