= The Pacific (miniseries) =

2010 American war drama miniseries

- Intertitle
- Genre: War drama
- Created by: Bruce McKenna
- Based on: With the Old Breed: At Peleliu and Okinawa by Eugene Sledge Helmet for My Pillow by Robert Leckie
- Written by: Bruce C. McKenna; Robert Schenkkan; Graham Yost; George Pelecanos; Laurence Andries; Michelle Ashford
- Directed by: Tim Van Patten; David Nutter; Jeremy Podeswa; Graham Yost; Carl Franklin; Tony To
- Starring: James Badge Dale; Joseph Mazzello; Jon Seda
- Composers: Hans Zimmer; Geoff Zanelli; Blake Neely
- Country of origin: United States
- Original language: English
- No. of episodes: 10

Production
- Executive producers: Steven Spielberg; Tom Hanks; Gary Goetzman
- Producers: Cherylanne Martin; Todd London; Steven Shareshian
- Running time: 47–61 minutes
- Production companies: HBO Entertainment; DreamWorks Television; Playtone
- Budget: $217 million

Original release
- Network: HBO
- Release: March 14 – May 16, 2010

Related
- Band of Brothers; Masters of the Air

The Pacific is a 2010 American war drama miniseries produced by HBO, Playtone, and DreamWorks that premiered in the United States on March 14, 2010. The Pacific is the second of three companion piece miniseries developed by Playtone and DreamWorks, following Band of Brothers (2001) and preceding Masters of the Air (2024).

The series focuses on the United States Marine Corps's actions in the Pacific Theater of Operations within the wider Pacific War. Whereas Band of Brothers followed the men of Easy Company of the 506th Parachute Infantry Regiment through the European Theater, The Pacific centers on the experiences of Marines Robert Leckie (James Badge Dale), Eugene Sledge (Joseph Mazzello), and John Basilone (Jon Seda), who were in different regiments (1st, 5th, and 7th, respectively) of the 1st Marine Division. The Pacific miniseries features the 1st Marine Division's battles in the Pacific from their interconnected perspectives, namely Guadalcanal (Leckie and Basilone), Cape Gloucester (Leckie), Peleliu (Leckie and Sledge), Iwo Jima (Basilone), and Okinawa (Sledge).

The show was spearheaded by Bruce C. McKenna (credited as a co-executive producer), one of the main writers on Band of Brothers. Hugh Ambrose, the son of Band of Brothers author Stephen Ambrose, was a project consultant. It is based primarily on the memoirs of Sledge and Leckie: With the Old Breed: At Peleliu and Okinawa and Helmet for My Pillow respectively. It also draws on Sledge's memoir China Marine, as well as Red Blood, Black Sand, the memoir of Chuck Tatum (Ben Esler), a Marine who fought alongside Basilone at Iwo Jima. Also used for reference, albeit in an uncredited capacity, was Hugh Ambrose's nonfiction book The Pacific, written as a tie-in to the miniseries. Basilone died on Iwo Jima and thus did not record his experiences.

The Pacific received highly positive reviews, particularly for its darker, more psychological tone and accurate depiction of the graphic violence exhibited in the Pacific War, although it received criticism for its more disjointed narrative structure compared to Band of Brothers. Like its predecessor, it would win the Primetime Emmy Award for Outstanding Miniseries.

== Cast ==
The main cast is listed in the opening and closing credits in alphabetical order with the exception of the three protagonists. Each main character is listed only in the episodes they appear with the three protagonists, who are credited in all episodes.

- James Badge Dale as PFC. Robert Leckie (1920–2001)
- Joseph Mazzello as Cpl. Eugene Sledge (1923–2001)
- Jon Seda as GySgt. John Basilone (1916–1945)
- Jon Bernthal as Sgt. Manuel "Manny" Rodriguez (1922−1942)
- Joshua Bitton as Sgt. J. P. Morgan (1919–1980)
- Dwight Braswell as PFC. Clifford "Steve" Evanson (1926–1945)
- Laurence Breuls as 1st Lt. Larkin (1917-1965)
- Betty Buckley as Marion Leckie (1874-1958)
- Tom Budge as PFC. Ronnie Gibson (1919-1997)
- Mark Casamento as Cpl. Giorgio "George" Basilone (1922–1990)
- Joshua Close as Major Edward Sledge, Jr. (1920–1985)
- Nate Corddry as PFC. "Loudmouth" (−1944)
- Matt Craven as Capt. Grant
- Linda Cropper as Mary Frank Sledge (1893–1989)
- Caroline Dhavernas as Vera Keller (1923–2024)
- Ben Esler as PFC. Charles "Chuck" Tatum (1926–2014)
- Brendan Fletcher as PFC. Bill Leyden (1926–2008)
- Leon Ford as 1st Lt. Edward "Hillbilly" Jones (1917–1944)
- Scott Gibson as Capt. Andrew "Ack-Ack" Haldane (1917–1944)
- Lelia Goldoni as Theodora "Dora" Basilone (1889–1951)
- Josh Helman as Cpl. Lew "Chuckler" Juergens (1918–1982)
- Ashton Holmes as Cpl. Sidney Phillips (1924–2015)
- Brandon Keener as Charles Dunworthy
- Andrew Lees as Pfc. Robert Oswalt (1923–1944)
- Isabel Lucas as Gwen
- Rami Malek as Cpl. Merriell "Snafu" Shelton (1922–1993)
- Martin McCann as Sgt. Romus "R.V." Burgin (1922–2019)
- Ian Meadows as Pvt. Cecil Evans (1924–2009)
- Toby Leonard Moore as 2nd Lt. Stone
- Rohan Nichol as 2nd Lt. Lebec
- Henry Nixon as 1st Lt. Hugh Corrigan (1920–2005)
- Keith Nobbs as PFC. Wilbur "Runner" Conley (1921–1997)
- Conor O'Farrell as Dr. Edward Sledge, Sr. (1887–1954)
- Annie Parisse as Sgt. Lena Basilone (1913–1999)
- Jacob Pitts as PFC. Bill "Hoosier" Smith (1922–1985)
- William Sadler as Lt. Col. Lewis "Chesty" Puller (1898–1971)
- Joseph R. Sicari as Salvatore Basilone (1884–1965)
- Gary Sweet as MGySgt. Elmo "Gunny" Haney (1898–1979)
- Anna Torv as Virginia Grey (1917–2004)
- Claire van der Boom as Stella Karamanlis
- Dylan Young as PFC. Jay De L'Eau (1923–1997)
- Ashley Zukerman as 2nd Lt. Robert "Mac" MacKenzie (1922–2004)
- John Reynolds as Cpl. Charles Womack (1923–2010)
- Adam Booth as Sgt. Ralph Briggs (–1998)

== Production ==
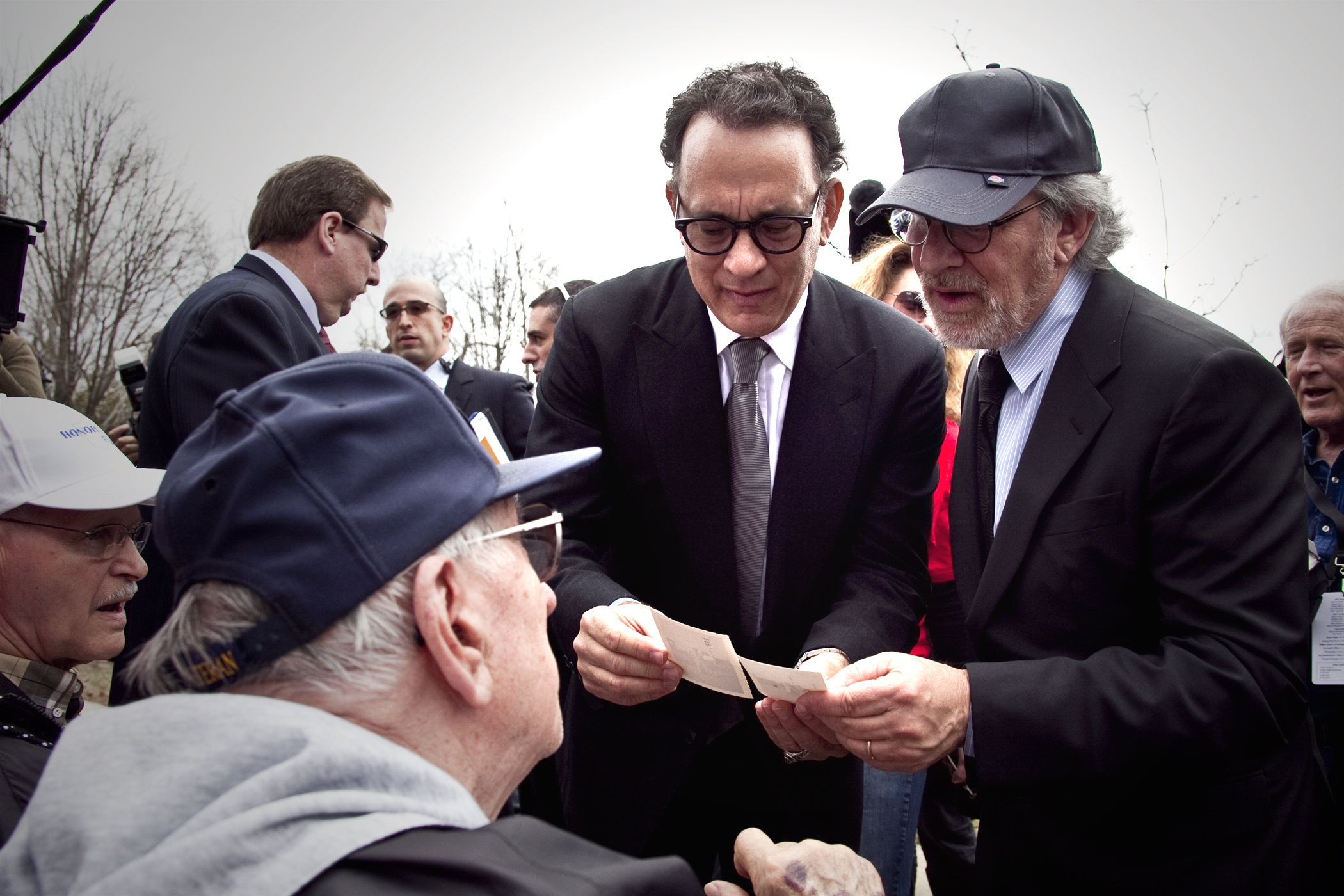
Executive producers Tom Hanks and Steven Spielberg talk with veterans of the World War II Pacific theater March 11 after a ceremony honoring the men at the World War II Memorial.

The Pacific was produced by Steven Spielberg, Tom Hanks, and Gary Goetzman in association with HBO Miniseries, Playtone, DreamWorks, Seven Network and Sky Movies. Seven and Sky both invested in the project for the right to broadcast it in Australia and the United Kingdom respectively. Nine Network has previously broadcast the HBO productions of Band of Brothers. Nine had a broadcast deal with HBO's parent Warner Bros., but then HBO started to distribute its productions separately. When work on the project began, DreamWorks' television division was operating as a unit of Paramount Pictures, with Paramount's parent company Viacom having purchased DreamWorks' live-action film and television divisions in February 2006. However, by the time The Pacific was released, DreamWorks' live-action film and television divisions had already split from Viacom, with Viacom still retaining ownership of DreamWorks' pre-existing live-action film and television libraries. In the show's credits, HBO was listed as the sole copyright holder.

In April 2007, the producers set up a production office in Melbourne and began casting. Originally the project was estimated at $100 million to produce, but ended up costing over $200 million, making The Pacific the most expensive television miniseries ever created at the time. According to the Sydney Morning Herald an estimated A$134 million was spent in Australia. The Australian newspaper Herald Sun estimates that it brought 4,000 jobs and generated A$180 million for the Australian economy.

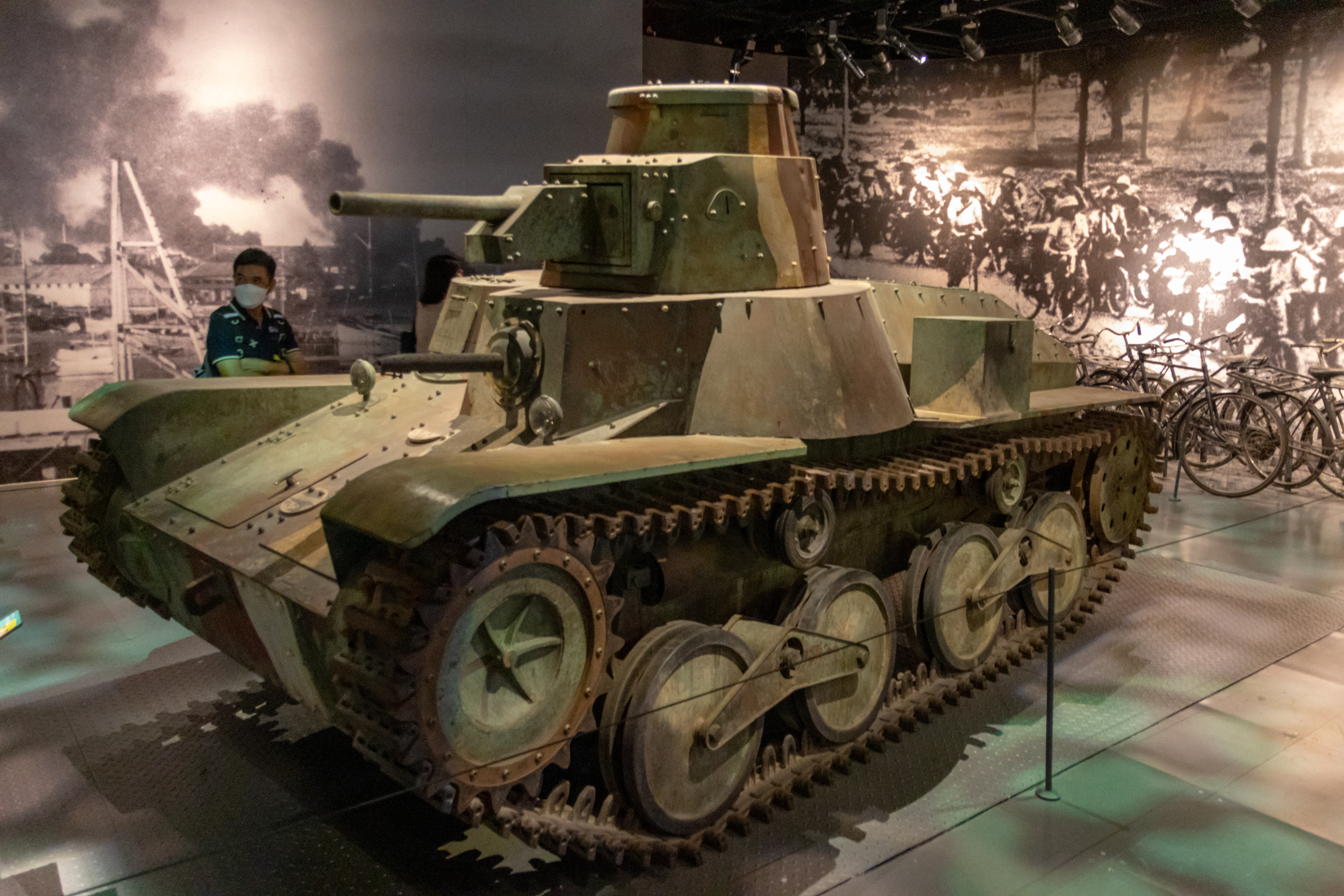
Replica Type 95 Ha-Go light tank in the National Museum of Singapore, one of four constructed for the miniseries.

Filming of the miniseries in Australia started on August 10, 2007, and finished in late May 2008. From August until November 2007 filming took place at locations in and around Port Douglas, Queensland including Mossman, Queensland; Drumsara Plantation, Mowbray National Park and beaches at Rocky Point, Queensland. Production then moved to rural Victoria, in the You Yangs near Lara (from November–December 2007), then at a sand quarry on Sandy Creek Road near Geelong until February 2008. Melbourne city locations were used in late 2007 and through 2008 including Central City Studios at Melbourne Docklands (March 2008); Flinders Street (between Swanston and Elizabeth streets, February 1–4, 2008); the intersection of Swanston and Flinders streets (February 2008); Flinders Street station (February 2–3, 2008). Other suburban locations included Mornington Railway, Bundoora, specifically the Ernest Jones Hall at the La Trobe University campus, Bundoora (late May 2008); the Railway Hotel, South Melbourne (December 2007); Scotch College, Melbourne (December 2007); Melbourne High School (December 2007).

The trains in the series, including K class and S class locomotives, and Club Car Moorabool, were chartered from Steamrail and the Mornington Railway Preservation Society, and were filmed with on the Mornington Railway.

The series's score was written by Hans Zimmer, Geoff Zanelli and Blake Neely and was released on March 9, 2010.

Historian Hugh Ambrose, son of Band of Brothers author Stephen E. Ambrose, wrote the official tie-in book to the miniseries, The Pacific: Hell was an Ocean Away (2011), which follows the stories of two of the featured men from the miniseries, Basilone and Sledge, as well as stories of Sledge's close friend Sidney Phillips and two men not featured in the series, marine officer Austin Shofner and US Navy pilot Vernon Micheel. The different cast provides a wider view of the Pacific theatre, allowing the book to include the fall of the Philippines, Midway, Philippine Sea and Luzon and expand the narrative to include depictions of life as experienced by prisoners of war, senior officers and the development of naval aviation. It was published in the UK and the US in March 2010 and Ambrose gave a webcast interview about the book at the Pritzker Military Library on April 15, 2010.

== Broadcast ==
The series premiered in the US and Canada on March 14, 2010, on HBO. HBO Asia premiered The Pacific at 9 pm on April 3, 2010, with the first two episodes being consecutively broadcast in the first week. Singapore, Hong Kong, and Indonesia had dual languages available. Singapore, Hong Kong, Taiwan, Malaysia, and the Philippines broadcasts were available in high-definition on the HBO Asia HD Channel. The Pacific began broadcast on April 5, 2010, on Sky Movies in the United Kingdom and Ireland. In Portugal, the series was broadcast on April 5, 2010, on AXN and in HD on AXN HD two days after the original broadcast in the US. The series broadcast commenced in Australia on Channel 7 on Wednesday, April 14, 2010, at 8:30 pm. In Denmark, Norway, Finland, France, and Sweden, the series began broadcasting on Canal+; in Turkey, CNBC-e on April 18, 2010; in the Netherlands, on April 7, 2010, on Veronica; and in Greece, on Nova Cinema on April 10, 2010. In New Zealand, the series began broadcasting on April 12, 2010, on TV One. In Italy, the miniseries began broadcast on May 9, 2010, on Sky Cinema 1; in Germany, on July 15, 2010, on Kabel eins. In Japan, the miniseries started July 18, 2010, on WOWOW. In South Africa, the miniseries started broadcasting on May 5, 2010, on the Mnet channel. In the US, the rights to the series were picked up by Ovation and it started airing during 2019.

=== Marketing ===
The first official US trailer for The Pacific aired on HBO before the season two premiere of True Blood on June 14, 2009. It showed footage of the three main characters, including a conversation between Leckie and Sledge, Basilone's marriage, and numerous combat scenes. The trailer concluded with "2010" displayed on-screen, alluding to and confirming the series release date. A second trailer was released on the HBO website after which the date "March 2010" is displayed, giving a more specific series release date. On January 14, 2010, Comcast added on-demand content from the series, including a scene from The Pacific, interviews with the producers, and character profiles. Another trailer was shown in February 2010 during Super Bowl XLIV, depicting several combat scenes. An extended trailer (3:47) of the miniseries can be viewed on the series's official website.

== Episodes ==
No.	Title	Directed by	Written by	Original release date	US viewers (millions)
1	"Part One" "Guadalcanal (Leckie)"	Tim Van Patten	Bruce C. McKenna	March 14, 2010	3.08
In the weeks following the attack on Pearl Harbor, Robert Leckie attends church and runs into his longtime neighbor Vera Keller. Leckie, having enlisted in the United States Marine Corps, promises to write to her while overseas. Meanwhile, John Basilone and his fellow noncommissioned officers, Manny Rodriguez and J.P. Morgan, learn from Chesty Puller that the Marine Corps will be entering the Pacific Theater. They attend a Christmas dinner with the Basilone family. In Mobile, Alabama, childhood friends Eugene Sledge and Sidney Phillips say their goodbyes as Phillips prepares to depart for boot camp. In August 1942, the Guadalcanal campaign begins. Leckie and the 1st Marines witness the Battle of Savo Island and later participate in the Battle of Alligator Creek.
2	"Part Two" "Guadalcanal (Basilone)"	David Nutter	Bruce C. McKenna	March 21, 2010	2.79
Basilone and the 7th Marines land on Guadalcanal to bolster the defenses around Henderson Field. Basilone, attempting to relocate his machine gun to a better position, bare-handedly cradles the hot barrel and severely burns his arms. Despite this, he continues fighting and kills scores of Japanese troops. The following morning, Basilone discovers that Rodriguez has been killed in action.
3	"Part Three" "Melbourne"	Jeremy Podeswa	George Pelecanos and Michelle Ashford	March 28, 2010	2.77
The 1st Marine Division on Guadalcanal is relieved and arrives in Melbourne, Australia. Battle weary, many Marines go AWOL, engaging in drunken hijinks. Leckie falls in love with Stella Karamanlis, an Australian girl of Greek descent, who invites him to stay at her parents' home. Not wanting to go through the pain of losing him, Stella breaks up with Leckie and tells him not to return. As a result, Leckie becomes belligerently drunk; when his friend Lew Juergens asks Leckie to relieve him on guard duty so he can urinate, an officer catches him, culminating in Leckie pulling a sidearm and both he and Juergens are punished and demoted. Basilone receives the Medal of Honor for his actions on Guadalcanal and is sent home to sell war bonds.
4	"Part Four" "Cape Gloucester, Pavuvu, Banika"	Graham Yost	Robert Schenkkan and Graham Yost	April 4, 2010	2.52
Previously limited by a heart murmur, Eugene Sledge enlists in the Marines and trains for combat, while Leckie and the 1st Marine Division are put into action at Cape Gloucester. The relentless rain and jungle environment takes its toll on the Marines. The Marines arrive on Pavuvu, which serves as a temporary base for the 1st Marine Division. Leckie is treated for nocturnal enuresis caused by combat stress and is sent to a naval hospital on Banika to be hospitalized for a number of weeks before returning to Pavuvu.
5	"Part Five" "Peleliu Landing"	Carl Franklin	Laurence Andries and Bruce C. McKenna	April 11, 2010	2.71
Sledge is briefly reunited with Phillips on Pavuvu before Phillips departs to return home to Mobile. Sledge meets Merriell "Snafu" Shelton, R.V. Burgin, and Bill Leyden. The 1st Marine Division lands at Peleliu.
6	"Part Six" "Peleliu Airfield"	Tony To	Bruce C. McKenna and Laurence Andries and Robert Schenkkan	April 18, 2010	2.38
Sustaining heavy losses and fighting in exceedingly hot conditions with little drinkable water, the Marines move to capture Peleliu's vital airfield. Leckie is wounded by a blast concussion while trying to relay a message to the corpsman. With a face full of shrapnel and limited mobility, he is evacuated and sent to recuperate on a hospital ship.
7	"Part Seven" "Peleliu Hills"	Tim Van Patten	Bruce C. McKenna	April 25, 2010	2.55
Sledge and the 5th Marines move into Peleliu's Bloody Nose Ridge to face the Japanese. In the ensuing battle, Captain Andrew "Ack-Ack" Haldane is shot and killed by a Japanese sniper while assessing the area of Hill 140.
8	"Part Eight" "Iwo Jima"	David Nutter; Jeremy Podeswa	Robert Schenkkan and Michelle Ashford	May 2, 2010	2.34
Tired of selling war bonds, Basilone is transferred to the 5th Marine Division where he trains Marines for combat as a gunnery sergeant. He meets and marries Lena Riggi. Basilone lands at Iwo Jima, but is killed in action on the first day.
9	"Part Nine" "Okinawa"	Tim Van Patten	Bruce C. McKenna	May 9, 2010	1.81
Sledge and the 1st Marine Division land at Okinawa. Cynical and exhausted, Sledge and Shelton show no compassion for the Japanese troops and struggle to lead new replacement Marines fresh out of boot camp. The Marines are horrified to discover Okinawan civilians, including women and children, are being forced to act as cannon fodder. Sledge is nearly court martialed after assaulting a Japanese POW. As the battle concludes, the Marines hear of a "new bomb" that "vaporized an entire [Japanese] city in the blink of an eye".
10	"Part Ten" "Home"	Jeremy Podeswa	Bruce C. McKenna and Robert Schenkkan	May 16, 2010	1.96
Following the Japanese surrender, the Marines return home. Leckie takes a job with a newspaper; he starts a relationship with Vera, revealing that he never sent the letters he wrote because he believed he was not going to survive the war. Sledge, Shelton, and Burgin arrive home in the spring of 1946. Sledge is still haunted by the horrors of war, he struggles to adjust despite reassurance from his father and Phillips. Basilone's widow, Lena, visits his parents and gives them his Medal of Honor.

=== Special ===
Title	Directed by	Written by	Original release date	US viewers (millions)
"Anatomy of a War"	TBD	TBD	2010	TBD
This episode is a companion piece to the series. It uses historical footage, footage from the series, and interviews with participants, scholars, and members of the series cast and crew to try to explain the societal, cultural, and religious reasons that contributed to the ferocity and brutality of the Japanese military during World War II.

== Reception ==
=== Critical reception ===
The Pacific was widely praised. On the review aggregation website Rotten Tomatoes, the series holds an approval rating of 89% with an average rating of 8.5 out of 10, based on 46 reviews. The website's critical consensus reads, "An honest, albeit horrifying, exploration of World War II, The Pacific is a visually stunning miniseries not for the faint of heart." On Metacritic, the series has a weighted average score of 86 out of 100, based on 32 critics.

Time magazine's James Poniewozik named it one of the Top 10 TV Series of 2010. IGN reviewer Ramsey Isler gave the entire miniseries an 8.5 out of 10, saying, "Although I don't think The Pacific overtakes Band of Brothers in terms of technical execution and overall entertainment value, many of the comparisons will be moot as The Pacific is a different kind of series with different goals. This series sought to look beyond the combat and it paints a full, vivid picture of the war and the people that fought in it through focused, individual stories. That's a tall order for any series to fulfill, and although The Pacific doesn't always come through with shining colors, it does make an admirable effort." IGN also reviewed each episode, with Episode nine receiving a 10 out of 10 score.

=== Awards and nominations ===
Year	Award	Category	Nominee(s)	Result	Ref.
2010	Artios Awards	Outstanding Achievement in Casting – Television Movie/Mini Series	Meg Liberman, Cami Patton, Christine King, and Jennifer Euston	Won	
2010	Hollywood Post Alliance Awards	Outstanding Color Grading – Television	Steve Porter (for "Peleliu Landing")	Won	
2010	IGN Summer Movie Awards	Best TV DVD or Blu-Ray		Nominated	
2010	Las Vegas Film Critics Society Awards	Best DVD		Nominated	
2010	Online Film & Television Association Awards	Best Motion Picture or Miniseries		Won	
2010	Online Film & Television Association Awards	Best Actor in a Motion Picture or Miniseries	James Badge Dale	Nominated	
2010	Online Film & Television Association Awards	Best Actor in a Motion Picture or Miniseries	Joseph Mazzello	Nominated	
2010	Online Film & Television Association Awards	Best Supporting Actor in a Motion Picture or Miniseries	Ashton Holmes	Nominated	
2010	Online Film & Television Association Awards	Best Direction of a Motion Picture or Miniseries		Won	
2010	Online Film & Television Association Awards	Best Writing of a Motion Picture or Miniseries		Won	
2010	Online Film & Television Association Awards	Best Ensemble in a Motion Picture or Miniseries		Won	
2010	Online Film & Television Association Awards	Best Cinematography in a Non-Series		Won	
2010	Online Film & Television Association Awards	Best Costume Design in a Non-Series		Nominated	
2010	Online Film & Television Association Awards	Best Editing in a Non-Series		Won	
2010	Online Film & Television Association Awards	Best Makeup/Hairstyling in a Non-Series		Nominated	
2010	Online Film & Television Association Awards	Best Music in a Non-Series		Won	
2010	Online Film & Television Association Awards	Best Production Design in a Non-Series		Nominated	
2010	Online Film & Television Association Awards	Best Sound in a Non-Series		Won	
2010	Online Film & Television Association Awards	Best Visual Effects in a Non-Series		Won	
2010	Online Film & Television Association Awards	Best New Titles Sequence		Won	
2010	Primetime Emmy Awards	Outstanding Miniseries	Tom Hanks, Steven Spielberg, Gary Goetzman, Tony To, Graham Yost, Eugene Kelly, Bruce C. McKenna, Cherylanne Martin, Todd London, Steven Shareshian, and Tim Van Patten	Won	
2010	Primetime Emmy Awards	Outstanding Directing for a Miniseries, Movie or a Dramatic Special	David Nutter and Jeremy Podeswa (for "Iwo Jima")	Nominated	
2010	Primetime Emmy Awards	Outstanding Directing for a Miniseries, Movie or a Dramatic Special	Tim Van Patten (for "Okinawa")	Nominated	
2010	Primetime Emmy Awards	Outstanding Writing for a Miniseries, Movie or a Dramatic Special	Robert Schenkkan and Michelle Ashford (for "Iwo Jima")	Nominated	
2010	Primetime Emmy Awards	Outstanding Writing for a Miniseries, Movie or a Dramatic Special	Bruce C. McKenna and Robert Schenkkan (for "Home")	Nominated	
2010	Primetime Creative Arts Emmy Awards	Outstanding Art Direction for a Miniseries or Movie	Anthony Pratt, Dominic Hyman, Richard Hobbs, Scott Bird, Jim Millett, Rolland Pike, and Lisa Thompson	Won	
2010	Primetime Creative Arts Emmy Awards	Outstanding Casting for a Miniseries, Movie or a Special	Meg Liberman, Cami Patton, Christine King, Jennifer Euston, and Suzanne Smith	Won	
2010	Primetime Creative Arts Emmy Awards	Outstanding Cinematography for a Miniseries or Movie	Remi Adefarasin (for "Peleliu Landing")	Nominated	
2010	Primetime Creative Arts Emmy Awards	Outstanding Cinematography for a Miniseries or Movie	Stephen F. Windon (for "Okinawa")	Nominated	
2010	Primetime Creative Arts Emmy Awards	Outstanding Costumes for a Miniseries, Movie or a Special	Penny Rose and Ken Crouch (for "Melbourne")	Nominated	
2010	Primetime Creative Arts Emmy Awards	Outstanding Main Title Design	Steve Fuller, Ahmet Ahmet, Peter Frankfurt, and Lauren Hartstone	Nominated	
2010	Primetime Creative Arts Emmy Awards	Outstanding Makeup for a Miniseries or a Movie (Non-Prosthetic)	Chiara Tripodi and Toni French	Won	
2010	Primetime Creative Arts Emmy Awards	Outstanding Prosthetic Makeup for a Series, Miniseries, Movie or a Special	Jason Baird, Sean Genders, Jac Charlton, Chad Atkinson, Ben Rittenhouse, Steve Katz, Robert Charlton, and Greg Nicotero	Won	
2010	Primetime Creative Arts Emmy Awards	Outstanding Music Composition for a Miniseries, Movie or a Special (Original Dramatic Score)	Blake Neely, Geoff Zanelli, and Hans Zimmer (for "Home")	Nominated	
2010	Primetime Creative Arts Emmy Awards	Outstanding Single-Camera Picture Editing for a Miniseries or a Movie	Edward A. Warschilka (for "Peleliu Landing")	Nominated	
2010	Primetime Creative Arts Emmy Awards	Outstanding Single-Camera Picture Editing for a Miniseries or a Movie	Alan Cody (for "Iwo Jima")	Nominated	
2010	Primetime Creative Arts Emmy Awards	Outstanding Single-Camera Picture Editing for a Miniseries or a Movie	Alan Cody and Marta Evry (for "Okinawa")	Nominated	
2010	Primetime Creative Arts Emmy Awards	Outstanding Sound Editing for a Miniseries, Movie or a Special	Tom Bellfort, Benjamin L. Cook, Daniel S. Irwin, Hector C. Gika, Charles Maynes, Paul Aulicino, John C. Stuver, David Williams, Michelle Pazer, John Finklea, Jody Thomas, and Katie Rose (for "Peleliu Landing")	Won	
2010	Primetime Creative Arts Emmy Awards	Outstanding Sound Mixing for a Miniseries or a Movie	Andrew Ramage, Michael Minkler, and Daniel J. Leahy (for "Basilone")	Won	
2010	Primetime Creative Arts Emmy Awards	Outstanding Sound Mixing for a Miniseries or a Movie	Andrew Ramage, Michael Minkler, Daniel J. Leahy, and Craig Mann (for "Peleliu Landing")	Nominated	
2010	Primetime Creative Arts Emmy Awards	Outstanding Sound Mixing for a Miniseries or a Movie	Gary Wilkins, Michael Minkler, Daniel J. Leahy, and Marc Fishman (for "Iwo Jima")	Nominated	
2010	Primetime Creative Arts Emmy Awards	Outstanding Sound Mixing for a Miniseries or a Movie	Gary Wilkins, Michael Minkler, and Daniel J. Leahy (for "Okinawa")	Nominated	
2010	Primetime Creative Arts Emmy Awards	Outstanding Special Visual Effects for a Miniseries, Movie or a Special	John E. Sullivan, Joss Williams, David Taritero, Peter Webb, Dion Hatch, John P. Mesa, Jerry Pooler, and Paul Graff (for "Guadalcanal/Leckie")	Nominated	
2010	Primetime Creative Arts Emmy Awards	Outstanding Special Visual Effects for a Miniseries, Movie or a Special	John E. Sullivan, Joss Williams, David Taritero, David Goldberg, Angelo Sahin, Marco Recuay, William Mesa, Chris Bremble, and Jerry Pooler (for "Peleliu Landing")	Won	
2010	Satellite Awards	Best Miniseries		Nominated	
2010	Television Critics Association Awards	Outstanding Achievement in Movies, Miniseries and Specials		Won	
2011	American Cinema Editors Awards	Best Edited Miniseries or Motion Picture for Television	Marta Evry and Alan Cody (for Okinawa")	Nominated	
2011	American Film Institute Awards	Top 10 Television Programs		Won	
2011	American Society of Cinematographers Awards	Outstanding Achievement in Cinematography in Motion Picture/Miniseries	Stephen F. Windon (for "Okinawa")	Won	
2011	Australian Cinematographers Society Awards	Drama or Comedy Series & Telefeatures	Stephen F. Windon (for "Iwo Jima")	Won	
2011	Cinema Audio Society Awards	Outstanding Achievement in Sound Mixing for Television Movies and Mini-Series	Andrew Ramage, Michael Minkler, and Daniel J. Leahy (for "Basilone")	Nominated	
2011	Cinema Audio Society Awards	Outstanding Achievement in Sound Mixing for Television Movies and Mini-Series	Andrew Ramage, Michael Minkler, Daniel J. Leahy, and Craig Mann (for "Peleliu Landing")	Nominated	
2011	Cinema Audio Society Awards	Outstanding Achievement in Sound Mixing for Television Movies and Mini-Series	Gary Wilkins, Michael Minkler, Daniel J. Leahy, and Marc Fishman (for "Iwo Jima")	Nominated	
2011	Cinema Audio Society Awards	Outstanding Achievement in Sound Mixing for Television Movies and Mini-Series	Gary Wilkins, Michael Minkler, and Daniel J. Leahy (for "Okinawa")	Nominated	
2011	Costume Designers Guild Awards	Outstanding Made for Television Movie or Miniseries	Penny Rose	Nominated	
2011	Critics' Choice Awards	Best Picture Made for Television		Won	
2011	Directors Guild of America Awards	Outstanding Directorial Achievement in Movies for Television and Miniseries	David Nutter and Jeremy Podeswa (for "Basilone")	Nominated	
2011	Directors Guild of America Awards	Outstanding Directorial Achievement in Movies for Television and Miniseries	Jeremy Podeswa (for "Home")	Nominated	
2011	Directors Guild of America Awards	Outstanding Directorial Achievement in Movies for Television and Miniseries	Tim Van Patten (for "Okinawa")	Nominated	
2011	Golden Globe Awards	Best Miniseries or Television Film		Nominated	
2011	Golden Reel Awards	Best Sound Editing – Long Form Dialogue and ADR in Television	Tom Bellfort, Daniel S. Irwin, John C. Stuver, Michael Hertlein, Michelle Pazer, and David Williams (for "Basilone")	Won	
2011	Golden Reel Awards	Best Sound Editing - Long Form Sound Effects and Foley in Television	Tom Bellfort, Hector C. Gika, Paul Aulicino, Benjamin L. Cook, Charles Maynes, Katherine Rose, and Jody Thomas (for "Peleliu Landing")	Won	
2011	Guild of Music Supervisors Awards	Best Music Supervision for Movie of the Week	Deva Anderson and Evyen Klean	Nominated	
2011	Guild of Music Supervisors Awards	Best Music Supervision for Movie of the Week	Evyen Klean (Note: Also for The Special Relationship, Temple Grandin, and You Don't Know Jack.)	Won	
2011	Humanitas Prize	60 Minute Network or Syndicated Television	Bruce C. McKenna and Robert Schenkkan (for "Home")	Nominated	
2011	Imagen Awards	Best Supporting Actor – Television	Jon Seda	Nominated	
2011	Imagen Awards	Best Actor – Television	Jon Seda	Nominated	
2011	NAACP Image Awards	Outstanding Actor in a Television Movie, Mini-Series or Dramatic Special	Jon Seda	Nominated	
2011	Peabody Awards		A Playtone and DreamWorks Productions in association with HBO Miniseries	Won	
2011	Prism Awards	Performance in a TV Movie or Miniseries	James Badge Dale	Nominated	
2011	Producers Guild of America Awards	David L. Wolper Award for Outstanding Producer of Long-Form Television	Gary Goetzman, Tom Hanks, Eugene Kelly, Todd London, Cherylanne Martin, Bruce C. McKenna, Steven Shareshian, Steven Spielberg, Tony To, Tim Van Patten, and Graham Yost	Won	
2011	Visual Effects Society Awards	Outstanding Visual Effects in a Broadcast Miniseries, Movie or Special	John Sullivan, David Taritero, William Mesa, and Marco Requay	Won	
2011	Visual Effects Society Awards	Outstanding Created Environment in a Live Action Broadcast Program	Marco Recuay, Morgan McDermott, and Nicholas Lund-Ulrich (for "Iwo Jima" – Battle of Iwo Jima)	Won	
2011	Visual Effects Society Awards	Outstanding Compositing in a Broadcast Program or Commercial	Jeremy Nelson, John P. Mesa, Dan Novy, and Tyler Cote (for "Peleliu Landing")	Won	
2019	Online Film & Television Association Awards	Hall of Fame – Television Programs		Inducted	

== Home media ==
In 2011, HBO aired a documentary entitled He Has Seen War with Tom Hanks as executive producer and Mark Herzog as a director about the postwar stories of and lasting effects of the war, including post-traumatic stress disorder, on not only 1st Marine Division members but also the members of E ("Easy") Company, 2nd Battalion, 506th Parachute Infantry Regiment of the 101st Airborne Division, who were the subjects of Band of Brothers after fighting in Operation Overlord in Normandy (including Brécourt Manor on D-Day and Carentan), in Operation Market Garden and Operation Pegasus in the Netherlands and in the Siege of Bastogne during the Battle of the Bulge.

Eugene Sledge's and Robert Leckie's families both appear, as does the family of Easy Company 1st Lieutenant Lynn "Buck" Compton. Staff Sergeant William "Wild Bill" Guarnere and Technical Sergeant Donald Malarkey, both of Easy Company, also appear alongside their families.
