= Chuck Tatum =

United States Marine

- Born: 23 July 1926; Tulsa, Oklahoma
- Died: 22 June 2014 (aged 87); Stockton, California
- Military career
- Allegiance: United States
- Branch: United States Marine Corps
- Service years: 1943–1945
- Rank: Private first class
- Units: Baker Company, 1st Battalion, 27th Marines, 5th Marine Division
- Conflicts: World War II: Battle of Iwo Jima (WIA)
- Awards: Bronze Star Medal with Combat "V"; Purple Heart
- Other work: Author; Racing driver

Charles William Tatum (23 July 1926 – 22 June 2014) was an American World War II veteran, Bronze Star recipient, race car driver and builder. He was a veteran of the Battle of Iwo Jima.

Tatum's war memoir, Red Blood, Black Sand, was one of five books used as source material for the Steven Spielberg and Tom Hanks produced HBO miniseries The Pacific. Tatum is portrayed in the series by actor Ben Esler.

== Biography ==
=== Military service ===
Tatum enlisted in the U.S. Marine Corps with parental permission when he was 17. He was assigned as a machine gunner and was sent to the newly activated 5th Marine Division at Camp Pendleton, California in 1944. There he was one of only two marines - the other being Clifford "Steve" Evanson, whom Tatum secretly called "The Lump" - who was initially assigned under the command of Medal of Honor recipient, Staff Sergeant John Basilone ("Manila John"), who had been newly assigned as a machine gun section leader. Basilone, who had become famous as part of a war bonds campaign, was recognized immediately by Tatum, leaving him starstruck.

Tatum was sent for further training with the 5th Division at Camp Tarawa near Hilo, Hawaii, which was preparing for the assault and capture of Iwo Jima. He was a member of Baker ("B") Company, 1st Battalion, 27th Marine Regiment, 5th Marine Division.

On 19 February 1945 (D-Day), his battalion (Landing Team 1-27) disembarked and landed on "Red Beach 2", on the southeast side of Iwo Jima, off of landing boats from the attack transport, USS Hansford (APA-106), with orders to, "land, seize, and occupy Iwo Jima" ("Island X"). Tatum and Evanson landed with the Marine infantry and their attached Navy medical corpsmen in LVTs (amtracs; amphibian tractors) from LST #10 that they had boarded 11 February when the USS Hansford stopped at Saipan. "Red Beach 2", a 550-yard landing zone, was about 800 yards across from Motoyama Airfield #1, which in turn was 1,500 yards north of Mount Suribachi on the south end of Iwo Jima. "Red Beach 2" was one of the seven color named and numbered landing zones that combined were two miles long on the east side of Iwo Jima. On the first day, Tatum and Evanson witnessed Basilone being killed in action on Iwo Jima; Basilone was awarded the Navy Cross posthumously. That same day, Tatum saved Evanson during fighting at Hill 362 on Iwo Jima; after Evanson had been shot by Japanese soldiers hiding in a cave, Tatum used his machine gun to kill the Japanese hiding inside. Tatum was awarded the Bronze Star Medal with "V" device for his efforts, but Evanson nevertheless succumbed to his wounds early the next morning.

Tatum spent a total of fifteen days fighting on Iwo Jima. He was eventually wounded in action and, suffering combat fatigue, evacuated from the island.

=== Career ===
Tatum became a successful race car driver and builder after the war. His son, Blake Tatum, drove a Crusader that was manufactured by his father's company to become the 1994 Formula Vee West Coast Regional Champion.

Tatum was active in Marine affairs and was twice the president of the Stockton Marine Corps Club in California. In 1995, he arranged a memorial service in Washington D.C. in recognition of the 50th anniversary of the Battle of Iwo Jima.

Tatum's book, Red Blood, Black Sand, first printed in 1995, is one of the five books used as a basis for the television mini-series The Pacific, in particular its eighth episode. In the series, Tatum is portrayed by actor Ben Esler.
