= Todd London =

American film and television producer

- Occupation: Television producer
- Writing career
- Notable work: Mad Men
- Website: toddlondon.com

Todd London is the senior vice president of post production at Walt Disney Motion Pictures Films. He has worked on over 50 films including Moana, Avatar: Fire and Ash, The Jungle Book, Beauty and the Beast, Saving Mr. Banks, and Diary of a Wimpy Kid films. He has worked on several series for HBO, including Carnivàle, Rome, and The Pacific which he received an Emmy for his producing. He was a producer on the first series of AMC drama Mad Men.
