= Tony To =

American film producer

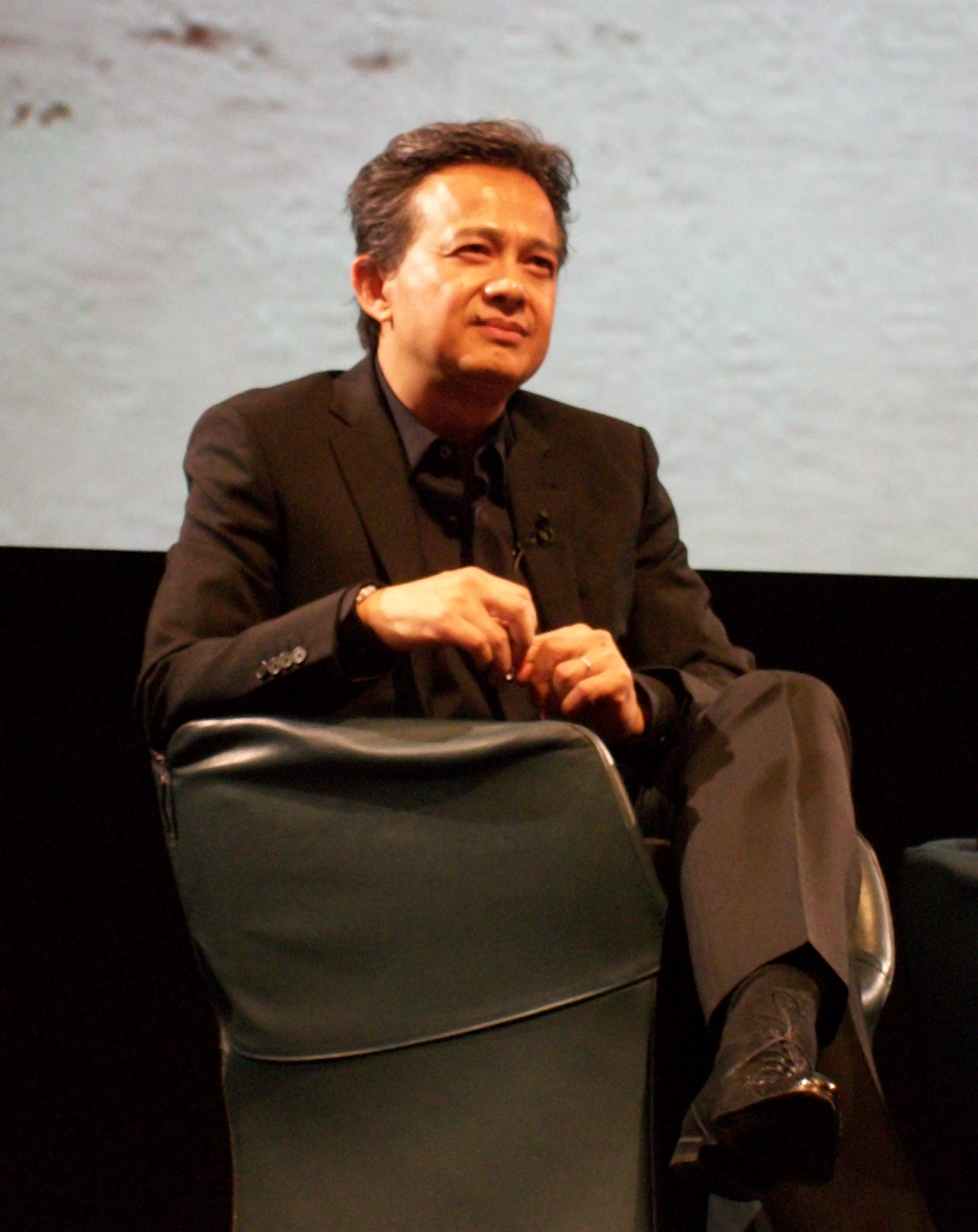
- Born: Bangkok, Thailand
- Occupations: Head of Production and Development at Lucasfilm; Television producer, television director
- Years active: 1985–present

Tony To is an American television producer and director and current head of production and development at Lucasfilm. He is best known for producing and also directing for the HBO miniseries Band of Brothers, for which he won an Emmy Award. To later returned to produce and direct for the 2010 companion miniseries The Pacific. He has also directed episodes of House and Harsh Realm. Before his position at Lucasfilm, To served as executive vice president of production for The Walt Disney Studios. On July 21, 2020, he and director Daniel Sackheim founded Bedrock Entertainment with ITV Studios America as partner.

To was born in Bangkok to Vietnamese parents and is a naturalized American citizen.

== Filmography ==
- The Pacific (TV) (2010)
- House (TV) (2006)
- Band of Brothers (TV) (2001)
- Harsh Realm (TV) (2000)
