= Hugh Ambrose =

American historian (1966–2015)

- Born: Hugh Alexander Ambrose; August 12, 1966; Baltimore, Maryland, U.S.
- Died: May 23, 2015 (aged 48); Helena, Montana, U.S.
- Occupations: Historian, author
- Spouse: Andrea Loiacano
- Children: 2
- Father: Stephen E. Ambrose

Hugh Alexander Ambrose (August 12, 1966 – May 23, 2015) was an American historian and the author of a best-selling popular history The Pacific which details the Pacific Theater in World War II. Ambrose rose to prominence as a researcher for and collaborator with his father, historian Stephen E. Ambrose.

== Education ==
Ambrose received his undergraduate and graduate degrees from the University of Montana.

== Academic career ==
Ambrose collaborated with his father on the book The Pacific. Following the elder Ambrose's death from cancer in 2002, Hugh Ambrose finished the book and served as a project consultant on the television series of the same name.

Ambrose was also a former vice president of The National WWII Museum.

== Public service ==
He was a trustee for the Lewis and Clark Library in Helena. He served on the board of the Myrna Loy Center for the Performing and Media Arts also in Helena.

== Personal life ==
With his family, he was a resident of Helena, Montana. He died in Helena of cancer at age 48. He was survived by his wife, a son and a daughter.
