= Sidney Phillips =

American physician

Sidney Clarke Phillips, Jr.
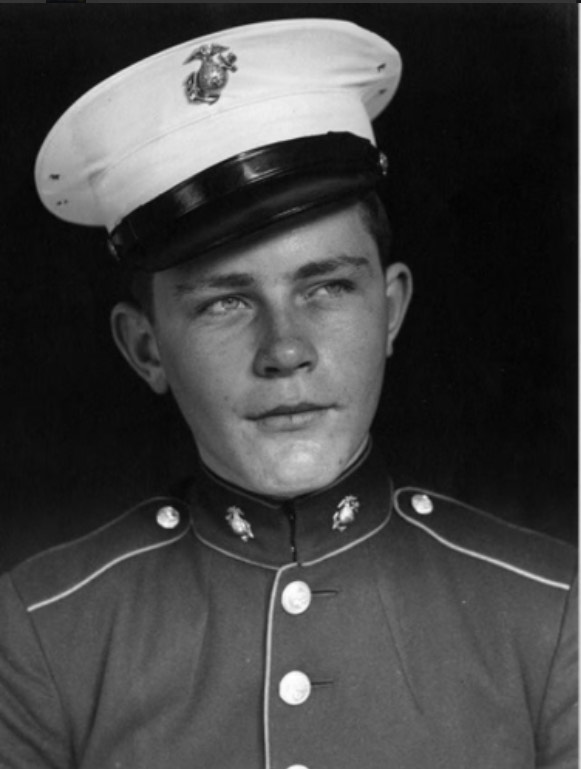
- Phillips in 1942
- Born: September 2, 1924; Mobile, Alabama, US
- Died: September 26, 2015 (aged 91); Mobile, Alabama, US
- Burial place: Pine Crest Cemetery, Mobile, Alabama
- Military career
- Allegiance: United States
- Branch: United States Marine Corps
- Service years: 1941–1945
- Rank: Corporal
- Nickname: Sid
- Units: How Company, 2nd Battalion, 1st Marines, 1st Marine Division
- Conflicts: World War II: Guadalcanal Campaign; Battle of Cape Gloucester
- Other work: Physician, writer

Sidney Clarke Phillips, Jr. (September 2, 1924 – September 26, 2015) was a United States Marine, family practice physician, and author from Mobile, Alabama. He provided source material and interviews for the making of Ken Burns' PBS documentary film The War and the HBO miniseries The Pacific. His recollections revolve around his time as a young man fighting in the Pacific War.

== Biography ==
=== Early life ===
Phillips was born in Mobile, Alabama, the second child after his sister Katharine (1923-2019). A younger brother, John, followed. Their father, Sidney (1893-1950), was a US Army veteran of the Battle of Argonne Forest who became a teacher, then the principal of Murphy High School, where Phillips graduated in 1941. He was childhood friends with Eugene Sledge.

=== Military service ===
After graduating from high school, Phillips enlisted in the U.S. Marine Corps at age 17, on December 8, 1941; the day after the Attack on Pearl Harbor. He was inducted later that month after obtaining parental permission.

He served with How Company, 2nd Battalion, 1st Marine Regiment, 1st Marine Division (H/2/1), with one of his company mates being Robert Leckie. Phillips saw combat as an 81mm mortarman in a number of battles including the Battle of the Tenaru during the Guadalcanal Campaign and the Battle of Cape Gloucester. He reported that his mortar crew observed effective fire control discipline; one example was a firefight on Cape Gloucester where they were able to provide light high explosive rounds through the jungle canopy only 15 yards in front of their own lines.

Phillips was eventually sent home after being picked in a lottery draw while on Pavuvu. Two weeks before leaving, he reunited with Sledge on Pavuvu after the latter was shipped out as a replacement. Phillips had previously sent Sledge several letters urging him not to enlist.

=== Post-war ===
After his overseas duty he enrolled in V12, a program designed to educate young men so they could become U.S. Navy officers. However, his four-year US Marine Corps enlistment expired on December 31, 1945, freeing him to return to Mobile.

He had decided while at Cape Gloucester to become a physician, so he enrolled in Spring Hill College, then went to medical school to become a family physician. He enlisted in the USMC Reserves while at Spring Hill, then was finally discharged in April 1948.

While at Spring Hill, Phillips re-acquainted himself with fellow local Mary Houston. The couple married in April 1946, with Sledge (who previously had a childhood crush on Houston) being his best man. He and Mary had three children together and they remained married until her death in 2000. Prior to Houston, Phillips had been in a relationship with a woman named Shirley Osborne while on leave in Melbourne following his time at Guadalcanal. Although they did not consummate the relationship, Houston still had all photos of Phillips and Osborne burnt. Osborne would go on to marry a Royal Australian Air Force pilot, and ten years after the war, she would visit Mobile and re-connect with Phillips, with her son going on to marry Phillips' daughter.

=== Death ===
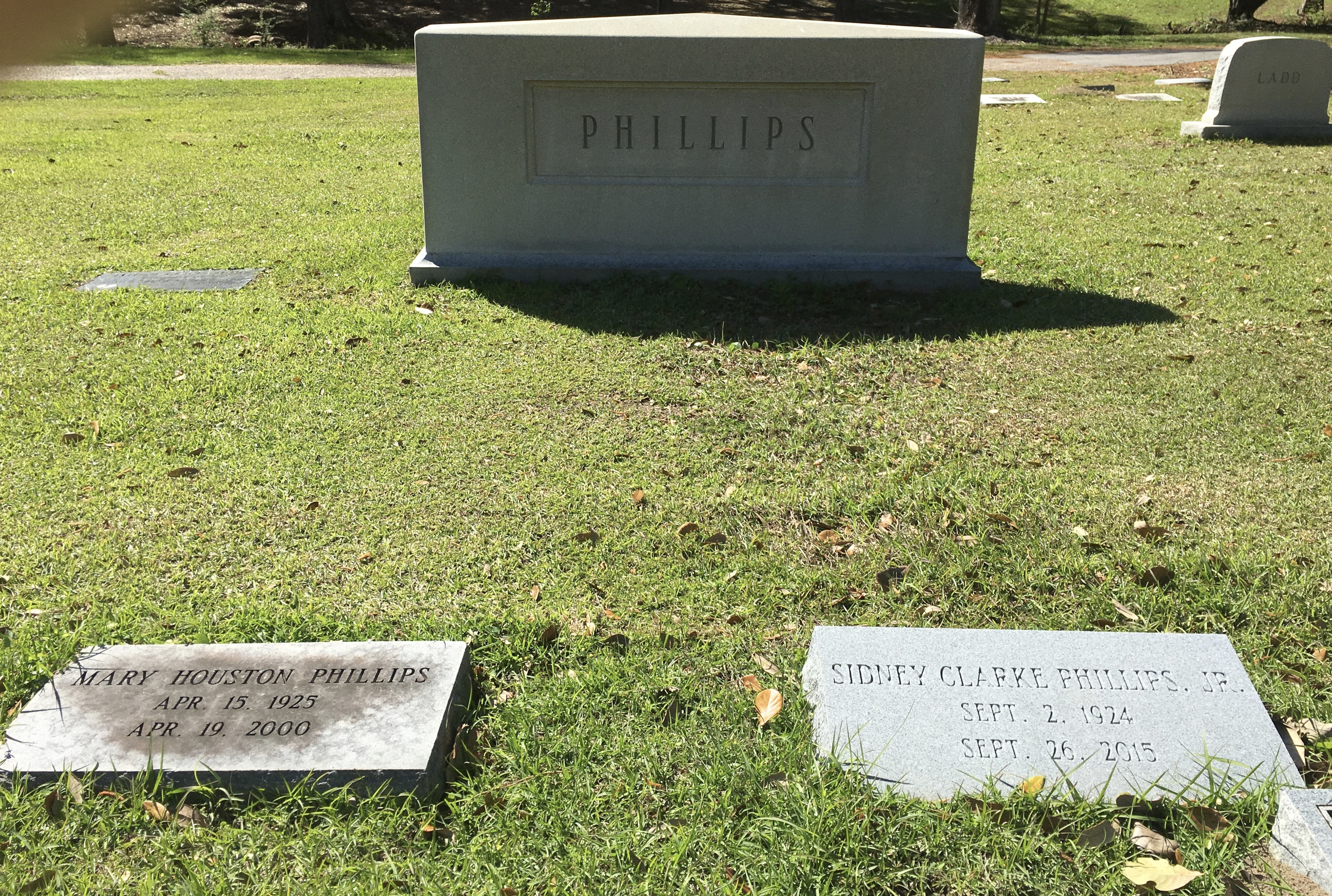
Gravesite of Sidney and Mary Houston Phillips at Pine Crest Cemetery, Mobile, Alabama

Phillips died on September 26, 2015. He is buried at Pine Crest Cemetery in Mobile, and is survived by his three children, twelve grandchildren, and seven great-grandchildren.

== In media ==
Phillips wrote the memoir You'll be Sor-ree, an accounting of his experiences in the Marines. As a surviving veteran of World War II battles including the Guadalcanal Campaign and the Battle of Cape Gloucester, he provided valuable documentary interviews describing his recollections of the Pacific Theater of Operations. Phillips reported that Sledge's widow and sons introduced him to Ken Burns' writing team, then later the HBO writers, so that he was able to provide needed information about the lives of Marines in combat for the making of The Pacific.

Phillips was played by actor Ashton Holmes in the HBO miniseries The Pacific. Phillips serves as the primary connective tissue between Leckie's and Sledge's stories, although it exaggerates his relationship with the former to do so. Phillips was also interviewed for the series and provided bonus commentary, alongside his sister.

== See also ==
- Robert Leckie
- Eugene Sledge
