= Pavuvu =

Island of the Russell Islands in Central Province, Solomon Islands

Pavuvu Island
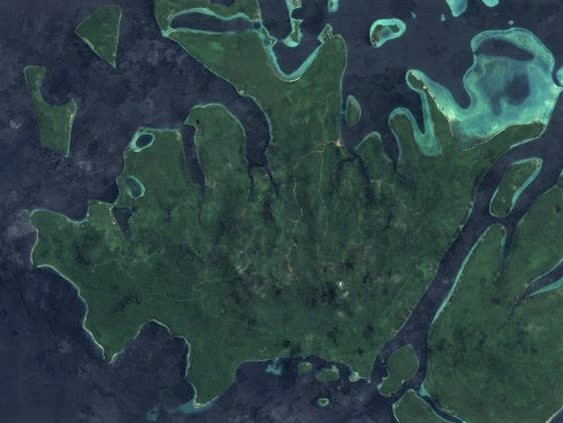
- Satellite image of Pavuvu Island

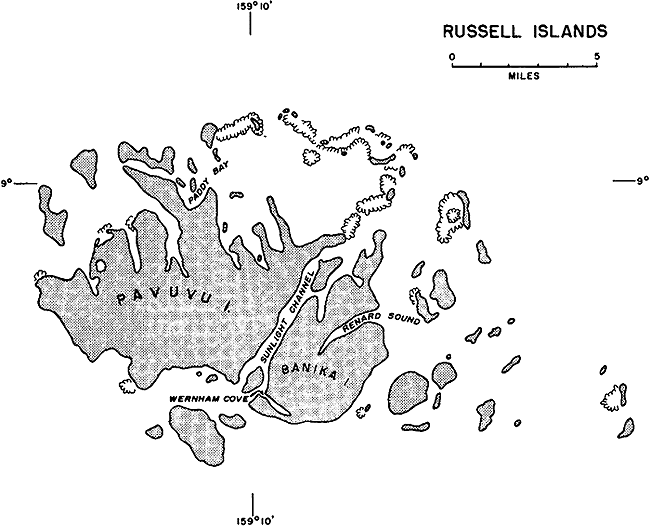
- Map of Russell Islands showing Pavuvu Island to the left

- Location in the Solomon Islands

Geography
- Location: South Pacific Ocean
- Coordinates: 009°04′01.2″S 159°07′04.8″E
- Archipelago: Russell Islands

Administration
- Solomon Islands
- Province: Central Province
- Largest village: Nukufero

Pavuvu is the largest of the Russell Islands in Central Province, Solomon Islands. It is located northwest of Guadalcanal. The area is 129.19 square kilometres (49.88 sq mi). The largest village is Nukufero on the north coast.

The island had served as a coconut plantation for natives. In 1942, following the beginning of the Pacific Theater of World War II, the Imperial Japanese Navy swept over the Solomon Islands, leading to the natives abandoning the island. After the United States captured Guadalcanal, they were able to use the airfield to bomb out the Japanese garrisons on nearby islands. Pavuvu was one of them. This island served as temporary home to the U.S. 1st Marine Division, starting in May 1944 after their action on Cape Gloucester, and again after their action on Peleliu. After the war, the natives returned to the island and resumed the coconut plantation.
