= Helmet for My Pillow =

1957 book by Robert Leckie

- First edition
- Author: Robert Leckie
- Language: English
- Publisher: Random House
- Publication date: 1957
- Publication place: United States
- Media type: Print, Audiobook
- Pages: 320

Helmet for My Pillow is a World War II memoir written by United States Marine Corps veteran, author, and military historian Robert Leckie. First published in 1957, the story begins with Leckie's enlisting in the United States Marines shortly after the 1941 attack on Pearl Harbor.

According to his wife Vera, Leckie was inspired to write the book in 1951 after seeing South Pacific on Broadway and walking out halfway through it. He said, "I have to tell the story of how it really was. I have to let people know the war wasn't a musical."

The HBO mini-series The Pacific (2010) was adapted in large part from Helmet for My Pillow, along with Eugene Sledge's With the Old Breed: At Peleliu and Okinawa, and the personal story of Medal of Honor recipient Gunnery Sergeant John Basilone.

== Synopsis ==
Beginning with boot camp in MCRD Parris Island, South Carolina, the story follows Leckie through basic training and then to New River, North Carolina where he is briefly stationed, and follows him to the Pacific.

Leckie is assigned to the 1st Marine Division and is deployed to Guadalcanal, Melbourne Australia, New Guinea, Cape Gloucester, before being evacuated with wounds from the island of Peleliu. Helmet for My Pillow is told from an enlisted man's point of view; a reprint edition stated the book was about "the booze, the brawling, the loving on 72-hour liberty, the courageous fighting and dying in combat as the U.S. Marines slugged it out, inch by inch, across the Pacific."

In line with the book's poetic prose, many of the characters in the story are given aliases and are not directly identified. For example, an Australian guide to the Marines is given the name "The Digger", while a Marine war criminal experiencing a severe mental breakdown is known as "The Kid".

== Adaptations ==
E.B. Sledge's With the Old Breed: At Peleliu and Okinawa, along with Helmet for My Pillow, formed the basis for the HBO miniseries The Pacific, the successor to Band of Brothers. Leckie is portrayed in the series by James Badge Dale.

== Sources ==
- Leckie, Robert (September 3, 1995). "Booknotes: 'Okinawa: The Last Battle of World War II' by Robert Leckie". C-SPAN (Interview). Interviewed by Brian Lamb.
