= Bruce C. McKenna =

American screenwriter

Bruce McKenna
- Born: March 14, 1962 (age 64); Englewood, New Jersey
- Occupations: Screenwriter, television writer, television producer
- Years active: 2001–present

Bruce C. McKenna (born March 14, 1962) is an American writer for television and film. He was the co-executive producer, creator, principal writer and researcher on the 2010 HBO 10 part mini-series, The Pacific, which was co-produced by Steven Spielberg and Tom Hanks.

== Early life ==
McKenna, a native of Englewood, New Jersey, is the youngest son of paleontologist Malcolm McKenna and Priscilla McKenna, who had served as Englewood's City Council President. He attended Elisabeth Morrow School and graduated from Dwight-Englewood School in 1980 and Wesleyan University in 1984, Phi Beta Kappa, where he majored in European history and received the Dutcher History Prize. At Wesleyan, Bruce holds an All-Time Men's Lacrosse Individual Scoring Leaders Record for most goals in one game (8) and is listed as a Career 100 Point Scorer. After graduation, he attended the Ph.D. program in Russian and Soviet intellectual history at Stanford University for one year. McKenna left Stanford to become a freelance writer focusing in politics and foreign affairs.

== Career ==
Before his work in television and film, McKenna worked as a journalist and freelance writer. He has written many articles on the Soviet Union, Eastern Europe, and Pakistan, and has interviewed Prime Minister Benazir Bhutto. McKenna "was the first Western journalist to write about Pamyat, the Russian anti-Semitic movement that emerged after the breakup of the Soviet Union." His work has appeared in Arete, the arts magazine, The National Review, The New York Times, and other publications.

In 2001, he wrote three episodes of the television series Band of Brothers, entitled: "The Last Patrol" (co-writer; eighth episode), "Bastogne" (sole writer; sixth episode), and "Replacements" (co-writer; fourth episode). McKenna's "Bastogne" episode won a Writers Guild Award, garnered an Emmy nomination, and was a finalist for the Humanitas Prize.

The Pacific received eight Emmy Awards, including one for Outstanding Miniseries, at the 62nd annual Emmy Award ceremony held on August 29, 2010. The Pacific had been nominated for 24 Emmy Awards, including McKenna's nomination for "Outstanding Writing for a Miniseries, Movie or Dramatic Special" for his writing (with co-writer Robert Schenkkan) of the episode "The Pacific" - "Part Ten."

He is currently adapting Arthur C. Clarke's novel Rendezvous with Rama for the screen. He also is writing the screenplay for The Hands of Shang-Chi. In 2002, McKenna sold a pitch for an "Untitled Western" that he went on to write for a high-seven figure deal. Ridley Scott is currently attached to direct.
