= John Basilone =

US Marine Corps gunnery sergeant and Medal of Honor recipient (1916–1945)

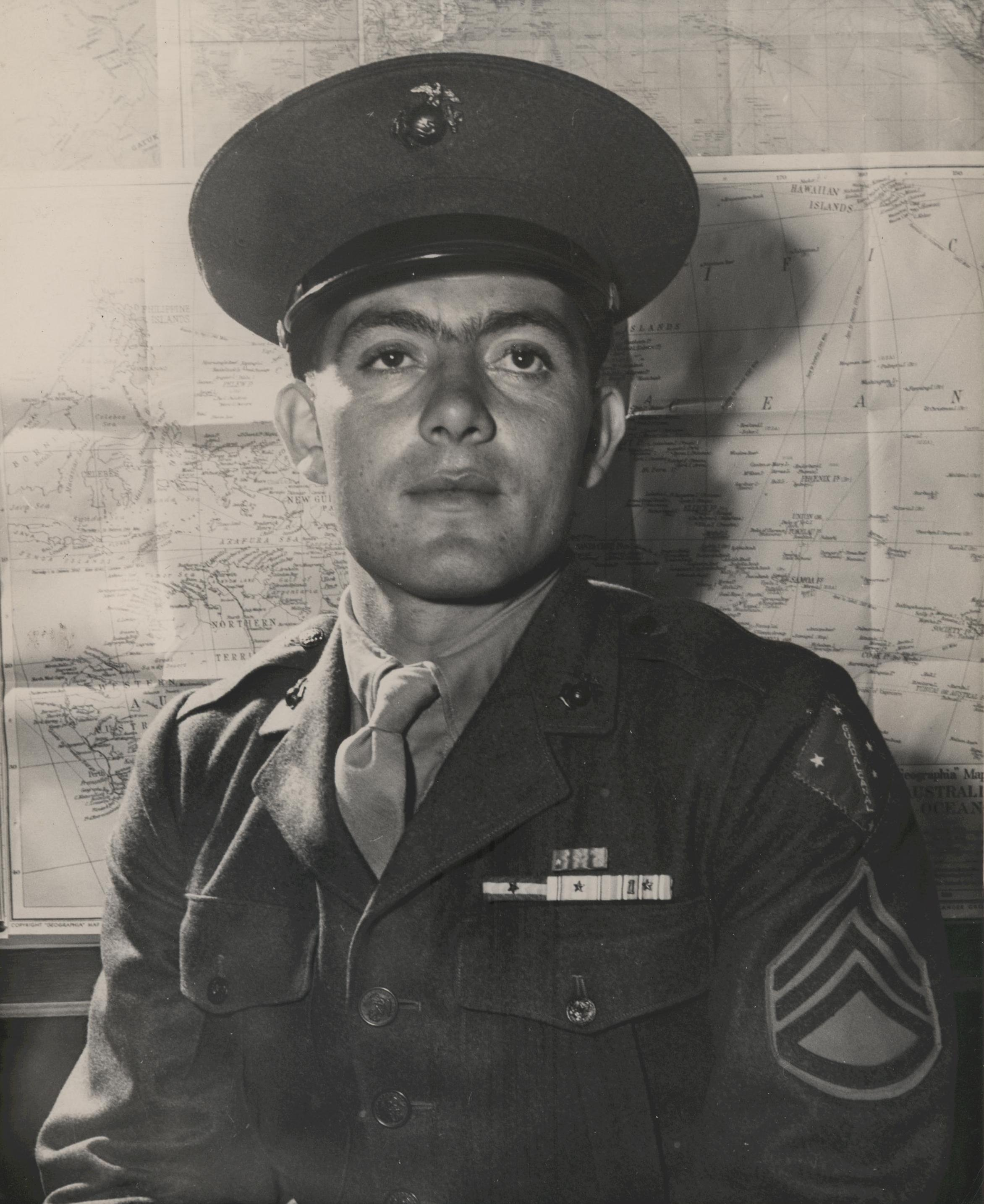
- Basilone in 1943
- Born: November 4, 1916; Buffalo, New York, U.S.
- Died: February 19, 1945 (aged 28); Iwo Jima, Japan
- Burial place: Arlington National Cemetery
- Spouse: Lena Mae Riggi (m. 1944)
- Military career
- Allegiance: United States
- Branch: United States Army; United States Marine Corps
- Service years: USA: 1934–1937; USMC: 1940–1945
- Rank: USA: Private; USMC: Gunnery sergeant
- Nickname: "Manila John"
- Unit: USA: D Company, 16th Infantry Regiment; USA: D Company, 31st Infantry Regiment; USMC: D Company, 1st Battalion, 7th Marines, 1st Marine Division; USMC: C Company, 1st Battalion, 27th Marines, 5th Marine Division
- Conflicts: World War II; Guadalcanal Campaign; Battle for Henderson Field; Battle of Iwo Jima †
- Awards: Medal of Honor; Navy Cross; Purple Heart; Presidential Unit Citation with a bronze star; American Campaign Medal; American Defense Service Medal; Asiatic-Pacific Campaign Medal; World War II Victory Medal

John Basilone (November 4, 1916 – February 19, 1945) was a United States Marine Corps gunnery sergeant who received the Medal of Honor for actions during the Battle for Henderson Field in the Guadalcanal campaign, and the Navy Cross posthumously for extraordinary heroism during the Battle of Iwo Jima. He was the only enlisted Marine to receive both of these decorations in World War II.

Basilone enlisted in the Marine Corps on June 3, 1940, after serving three years in the United States Army with duty in the Philippines. He was deployed to Guantánamo Bay, Cuba, and in August 1942, he took part in the invasion of Guadalcanal. In October, he and the two machine-gun sections under his command held off an attack by a numerically far superior Japanese force. He was one of only three marines in that group to survive. His actions at Guadalcanal earned him the Medal of Honor. This led to him being called home for a war bond tour, which made him nationally famous.

Basilone would later re-enlist with the Marines, and in 1945 was killed in action on the first day of the invasion of Iwo Jima, after he led the charge to destroy a Japanese blockhouse and while leading a Marine tank under fire safely through a minefield. Including the Medal of Honor, he has received many posthumous honors, including having base streets, military facilities, and two United States Navy destroyers named in his honor. Basilone would gain renewed attention as one of the protagonists of the 2010 television miniseries The Pacific, in which he was portrayed by Jon Seda.

== Early life ==
Basilone was born in his parents' home in Buffalo, New York, on November 4, 1916. He was the sixth of ten children in an Italian-American family. His older siblings were born in Raritan, New Jersey, where the family returned after leaving Buffalo in 1918. Basilone attended St. Bernard Parochial School in Raritan, and after completing middle school at age 15, went to work as a golf caddy at the local country club, forgoing high school.

== Military service ==
=== U.S. Army ===
Basilone enlisted in the United States Army in July 1934 at the age of 17. His first posting was with the 16th Infantry Regiment at Fort Jay, New York, before being discharged for a day, reenlisting, and being assigned to the 31st Infantry Regiment. He completed the final two years of his enlistment serving in the Philippines, where he was a champion boxer, earning the ring nickname "Manila John." He was discharged from the Army in 1937 at the rank of private.

After Basilone returned to the United States, he worked as a truck driver in Reisterstown, Maryland. After a few years, he had the desire to return to the Philippines, where he had enjoyed life as a soldier, and believed he could get there faster by serving in the Marine Corps rather than in the Army.

=== U.S. Marine Corps ===
Basilone enlisted in the Marine Corps on July 11, 1940, in Baltimore, Maryland. He attended boot camp at Marine Corps Recruit Depot Parris Island, followed by training at Quantico and New River. His first posting was Guantánamo Bay, Cuba, in September 1940. In January 1941, Basilone was assigned to D Company, 1st Battalion, 7th Marine Regiment, 1st Marine Division, and was promoted to corporal in May. In January 1942, he was promoted to sergeant, and arrived in the Pacific in May as part of a Marine detachment sent to defend Samoa.

==== Guadalcanal ====
On September 18, 1942, the 7th Marine Regiment landed on the island of Guadalcanal. On October 24, during the Battle for Henderson Field, Basilone's 1st Battalion, under the command of Lieutenant Colonel Chesty Puller, came under attack by a regiment of about 3,000 soldiers from the Japanese Sendai Division using machine guns, grenades, and mortars against the American heavy machine guns. Basilone commanded two sections of machine guns in D Company, which fought for the next two days until only Basilone and two other Marines were left standing. As the battle went on, ammunition became critically low. Despite their supply lines having been cut off by enemies who had infiltrated into the rear, Basilone fought through hostile ground to resupply his heavy machine gunners with urgently needed supplies. Basilone moved an extra gun into position and maintained continual fire against the incoming Japanese forces. He then repaired and manned another machine gun, holding the defensive line until relief arrived.

When the last of the ammunition ran out shortly before dawn on the second day, Basilone, using his pistol and a machete, held off the Japanese soldiers attacking his position. By the end of the engagement, Japanese forces opposite the Marines' lines had been virtually annihilated. For his actions during the battle, Basilone received the United States military's highest award for valor, the Medal of Honor. Afterwards, Private First Class Nash W. Phillips of Fayetteville, North Carolina, recalled from the battle for Guadalcanal:

Basilone had a machine gun on the go for three days and nights without sleep, rest, or food. He was in a good emplacement, and causing the Japanese lots of trouble, not only firing his machine gun, but also using his pistol.

Basilone was formally awarded the Medal of Honor during a ceremony on May 21, 1943, and on June 1, he was promoted to platoon sergeant.

==== War bond tours ====
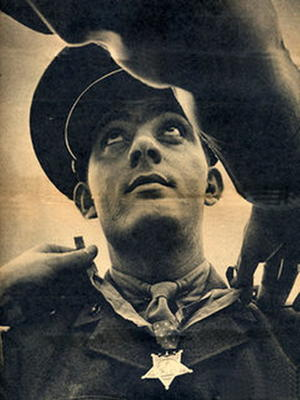
Basilone receiving the Medal of Honor in 1943

In August 1943, Basilone returned to the United States and participated in war bond tours, dubbed “Back the Attack!”. His arrival was highly publicized, and his hometown held a parade in his honor when he returned. The homecoming parade occurred on Sunday, September 19 and drew a huge crowd with thousands of people, including politicians, celebrities, and the national press. The parade made national news in Life magazine and Fox Movietone News. After the parade, Basilone toured the country raising money for the war effort and achieved celebrity status, often appearing with celebrities such as Virginia Grey, John Garfield, and Gene Lockhart.

Although he appreciated the admiration and dutifully performed at the rallies, Basilone felt out of place and requested to return to the operating forces fighting the war. The Marine Corps denied his request and told him he was needed more on the home front. He was offered an officer's commission, which he declined, and was later offered an assignment as an instructor, but refused this as well. When he requested again to return to the war, the request was approved. On December 27, 1943, Basilone left for training at Camp Pendleton, California, and on March 8, 1944, he was promoted to gunnery sergeant. On July 3, he reenlisted in the Marine Corps.

==== Marriage ====
While stationed at Camp Pendleton, Basilone met Lena Mae Riggi, a sergeant in the Marine Corps Women's Reserve. They were married at St. Mary's Star of the Sea Church in Oceanside, California, on July 10, 1944, with a reception at the Carlsbad Hotel. They honeymooned at an onion farm near Portland, Oregon.

==== Iwo Jima and death ====
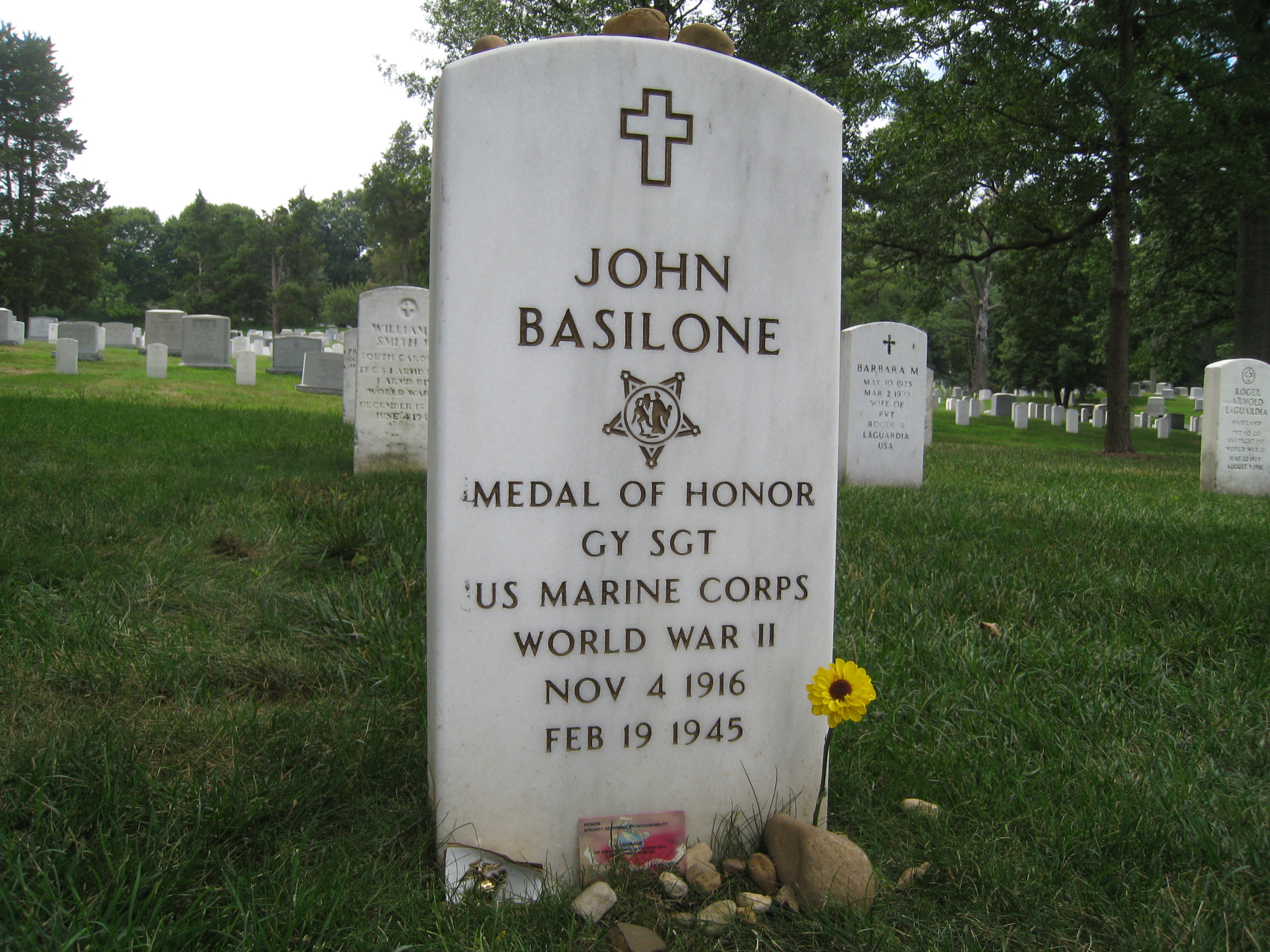
John Basilone's headstone in Arlington National Cemetery

After his request to return to the fleet was approved, Basilone was assigned to C Company, 1st Battalion, 27th Marine Regiment, 5th Marine Division. On February 19, 1945, the first day of the invasion of Iwo Jima, he was serving as a machine gun section leader on Red Beach II. While the Marines landed, the Japanese concentrated their fire at the incoming Marines from heavily fortified blockhouses staged throughout the island. With his unit pinned down, Basilone made his way around the side of the Japanese positions until he was directly on top of the blockhouse. Getting one of his former trainees in Camp Pendleton, Chuck Tatum, to provide suppressing machine gun fire, Basilone then attacked the blockhouse with grenades and demolitions and directed a flamethrower squad onto it, almost single-handedly destroying the entire strong point and its defending garrison. This included taking Tatum's machine gun and firing it from the hip at the escaping Japanese.

Telling Tatum “You’re staying here come hell or high water! I’m going back to get more Marines, and we’re going to fight our way across this island!”, Basilone then fought his way toward Airfield Number 1 to get reinforcements, aiding a Marine tank that was trapped in a Japanese minefield under intense mortar and artillery barrages. He guided the heavy vehicle over the hazardous terrain to safety, despite heavy weapons fire from the Japanese. Basilone was killed as he moved along the edge of the airfield. Original reports indicated he was hit by Japanese mortar shrapnel, although author Hugh Ambrose, following his research for the book and miniseries The Pacific, suggested that a burst of small arms fire hit him in the groin, neck, and left arm. Tatum, who witnessed his death, later recalled:

It wasn’t 10:30 in the morning, and this caused a shockwave throughout the troops because if John Basilone could get killed, we all wondered what was going to happen to the rest of us. We lost our hero, his wife lost her husband, his mother, father and brother lost their son and brother, and America lost its number one hero.

Basilone's actions helped Marines penetrate the Japanese defense and get off the landing beach during the critical early stages of the invasion. Basilone was posthumously awarded the Marine Corps' second-highest decoration for valor, the Navy Cross, for extraordinary heroism during the battle of Iwo Jima.

==== Burial ====
Basilone was initially buried in a makeshift grave on Iwo Jima. In April 1948, his remains were recovered at his family's request and re-buried at Arlington National Cemetery, in Arlington, Virginia. His widow, Lena M. Basilone, died on June 11, 1999, aged 86, and is buried at Riverside National Cemetery in Riverside, California. Lena's obituary notes that she never remarried and was buried still wearing her wedding ring. Basilone's Medal of Honor and Navy Cross are now exhibited at the National Museum of the Marine Corps.

== Awards and decorations ==
Gunnery Sergeant Basilone's military awards include:

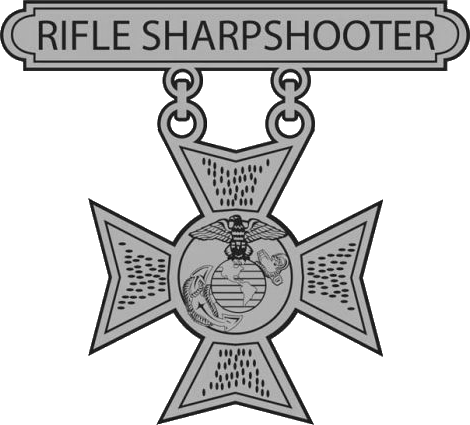

Medal of Honor	Navy Cross	Purple Heart
Navy Presidential Unit Citation with one star	Marine Corps Good Conduct Medal	American Defense Service Medal with one star
American Campaign Medal	Asiatic–Pacific Campaign Medal with two stars	World War II Victory Medal
United States Marine Corps Rifle Sharpshooter badge

=== Medal of Honor citation ===
Basilone's Medal of Honor citation reads as follows:

The President of the United States in the name of The Congress takes pride in presenting the MEDAL OF HONOR to

SERGEANT
JOHN BASILONE
UNITED STATES MARINE CORPS

for service as set forth in the following CITATION:

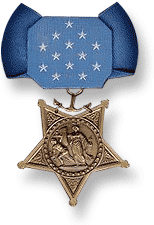
Medal of Honor

For extraordinary heroism and conspicuous gallantry in action against enemy Japanese forces, above and beyond the call of duty, while serving with the 1st Battalion, 7th Marines, 1st Marine Division in the Lunga Area, Guadalcanal, Solomon Islands, on 24 and 25 October 1942. While the enemy was hammering at the Marines' defensive positions, Sgt. BASILONE, in charge of 2 sections of heavy machine guns, fought valiantly to check the savage and determined assault. In a fierce frontal attack with the Japanese blasting his guns with grenades and mortar fire, one of Sgt. BASILONE'S sections, with its gun crews, was put out of action, leaving only 2 men able to carry on. Moving an extra gun into position, he placed it in action, then, under continual fire, repaired another and personally manned it, gallantly holding his line until replacements arrived. A little later, with ammunition critically low and the supply lines cut off, Sgt. BASILONE, at great risk of his life and in the face of continued enemy attack, battled his way through hostile lines with urgently needed shells for his gunners, thereby contributing in large measure to the virtual annihilation of a Japanese regiment. His great personal valor and courageous initiative were in keeping with the highest traditions of the U.S. Naval Service.

FRANKLIN D. ROOSEVELT

=== Navy Cross citation ===
Basilone's Navy Cross citation reads as follows:

The President of the United States takes pride in presenting the NAVY CROSS posthumously to

GUNNERY SERGEANT
JOHN BASILONE
UNITED STATES MARINE CORPS

for service as set forth in the following CITATION:

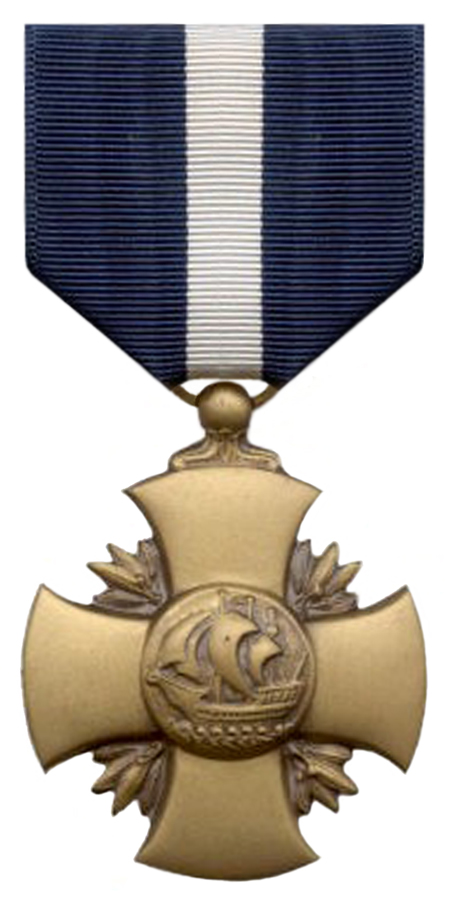
Navy Cross

For extraordinary heroism while serving as a Leader of a Machine-Gun Section, Company C, 1st Battalion, 27th Marines, 5th Marine Division, in action against enemy Japanese forces on Iwo Jima in the Volcano Islands, 19 February 1945. Shrewdly gauging the tactical situation shortly after landing when his company's advance was held up by the concentrated fire of a heavily fortified Japanese blockhouse, Gunnery Sergeant BASILONE boldly defied the smashing bombardment of heavy caliber fire to work his way around the flank and up to a position directly on top of the blockhouse and then, attacking with grenades and demolitions, single handedly destroyed the entire hostile strong point and its defending garrison. Consistently daring and aggressive as he fought his way over the battle-torn beach and up the sloping, gun-studded terraces toward Airfield Number 1, he repeatedly exposed himself to the blasting fury of exploding shells and later in the day coolly proceeded to the aid of a friendly tank which had been trapped in an enemy mine field under intense mortar and artillery barrages, skillfully guiding the heavy vehicle over the hazardous terrain to safety, despite the overwhelming volume of hostile fire. In the forefront of the assault at all times, he pushed forward with dauntless courage and iron determination until, moving upon the edge of the airfield, he fell, instantly killed by a bursting mortar shell. Stouthearted and indomitable, Gunnery Sergeant BASILONE, by his intrepid initiative, outstanding skill, and valiant spirit of self-sacrifice in the face of the fanatic opposition, contributed materially to the advance of his company during the early critical period of the assault, and his unwavering devotion to duty throughout the bitter conflict was an inspiration to his comrades and reflects the highest credit upon Gunnery Sergeant BASILONE and the United States Naval Service. He gallantly gave his life in the service of his country.

For the President,
JAMES FORRESTAL
Secretary of the Navy

== Other honors ==
Basilone received numerous honors, including the following:

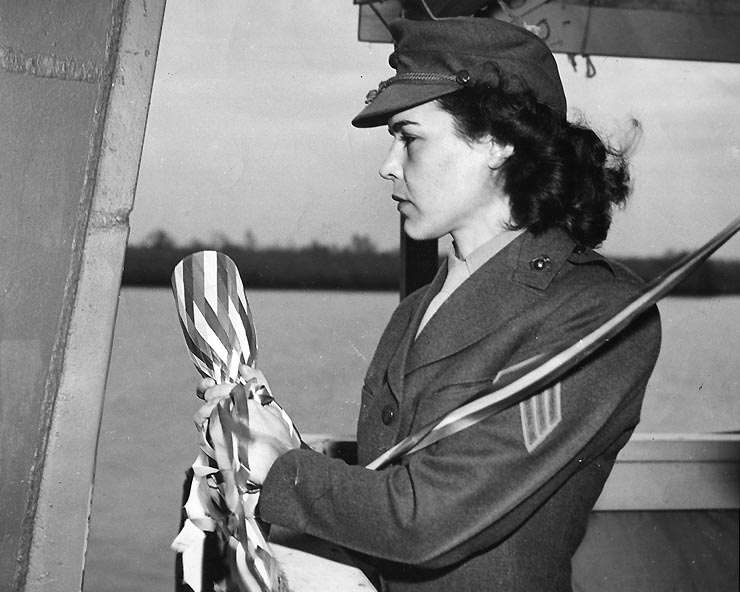
Sergeant Lena Mae Basilone, USMC(WR), widow of John Basilone, prepares to christen the destroyer USS Basilone (December 21, 1945).

=== Marine Corps ===
- An entry point onto Camp Pendleton from US Interstate 5 is called "Basilone Road"
- US Interstate 5 from the San Diego County line to Camp Pendleton to the south is called "Gunnery Sergeant John Basilone Memorial Highway"
- A parachute landing zone at Camp Pendleton is called "Basilone Drop Zone"
- During the Crucible portion of Marine Corps Recruit Training at Marine Corps Recruit Depot San Diego, there is an obstacle named "Basilone's Challenge" that consists of carrying ammunition cans filled with concrete up a steep, wooded hill

=== Navy ===
- The United States Navy commissioned USS Basilone, a Gearing-class destroyer, in 1949. The ship's keel was laid down on July 7, 1945, in Orange, Texas, and launched on December 21, 1945. His widow, Sergeant Lena Mae Basilone, sponsored the ship.
- A plaque at the United States Navy Memorial in Washington, D.C.
- The John Basilone (DDG-122), an Arleigh Burke-class destroyer, was commissioned in November 2024, homeported in Mayport, Florida.

=== Public ===
- In 1944, Army barracks from Washington state were moved to a site in front of Hansen Dam in Pacoima, California, and rebuilt as 1,500 apartments for returning Marines. This development was named the "Basilone Homes" and was used until about 1955. The site is now a golf course.

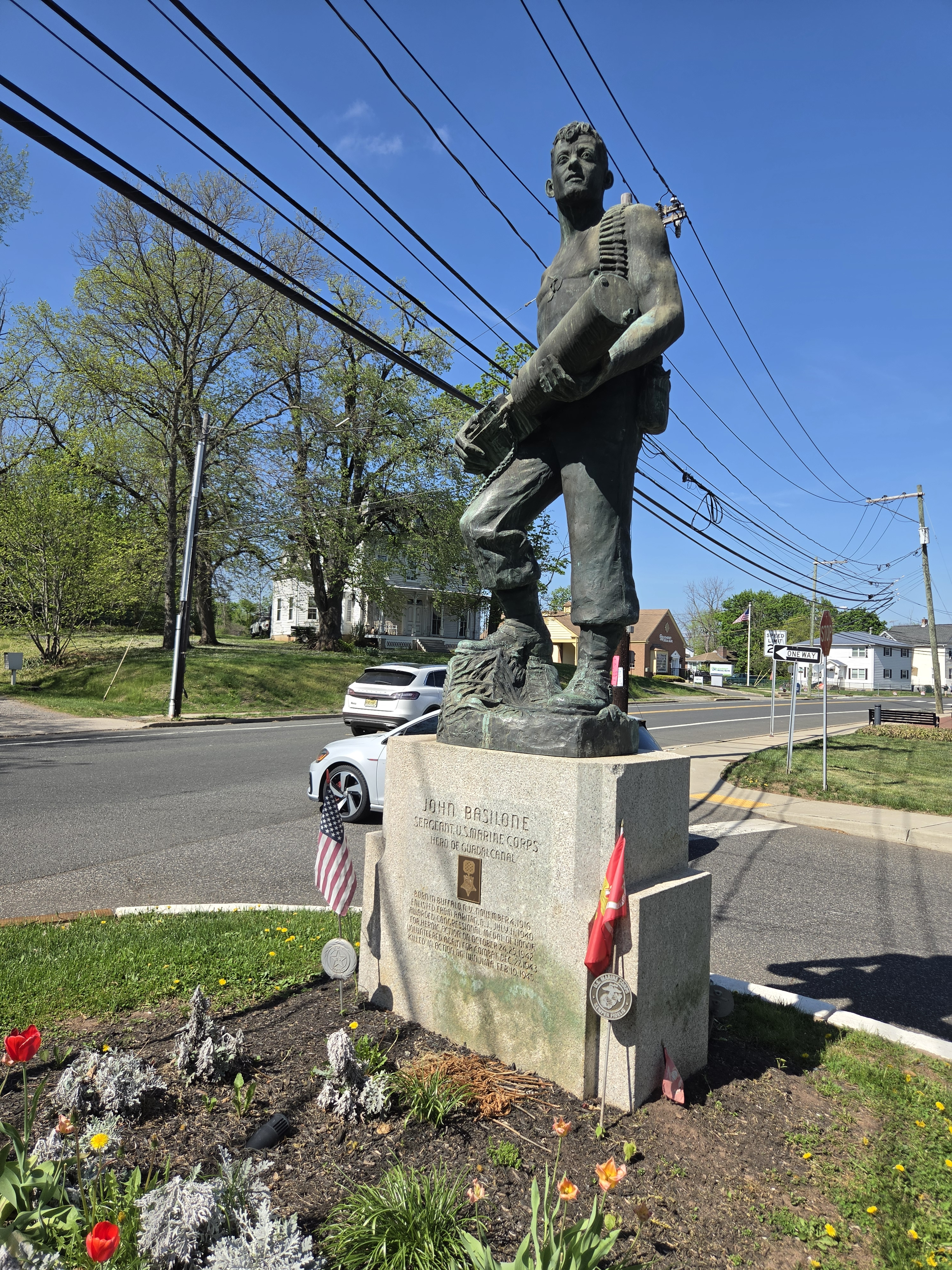
John Basilone statue outside Raritan, NJ

- In 1948, the John Basilone American Legion Post dedicated a memorial statue at the intersections of Somerset Street and Canal Street in Basilone's hometown of Raritan, New Jersey. The statue, featuring Basilone holding a water-cooled Browning machine gun, was sculpted by Phillip Orlando, a childhood friend, and also anchors John Basilone Memorial Park, which features three additional monuments dedicated to Somerset County's service men and women.

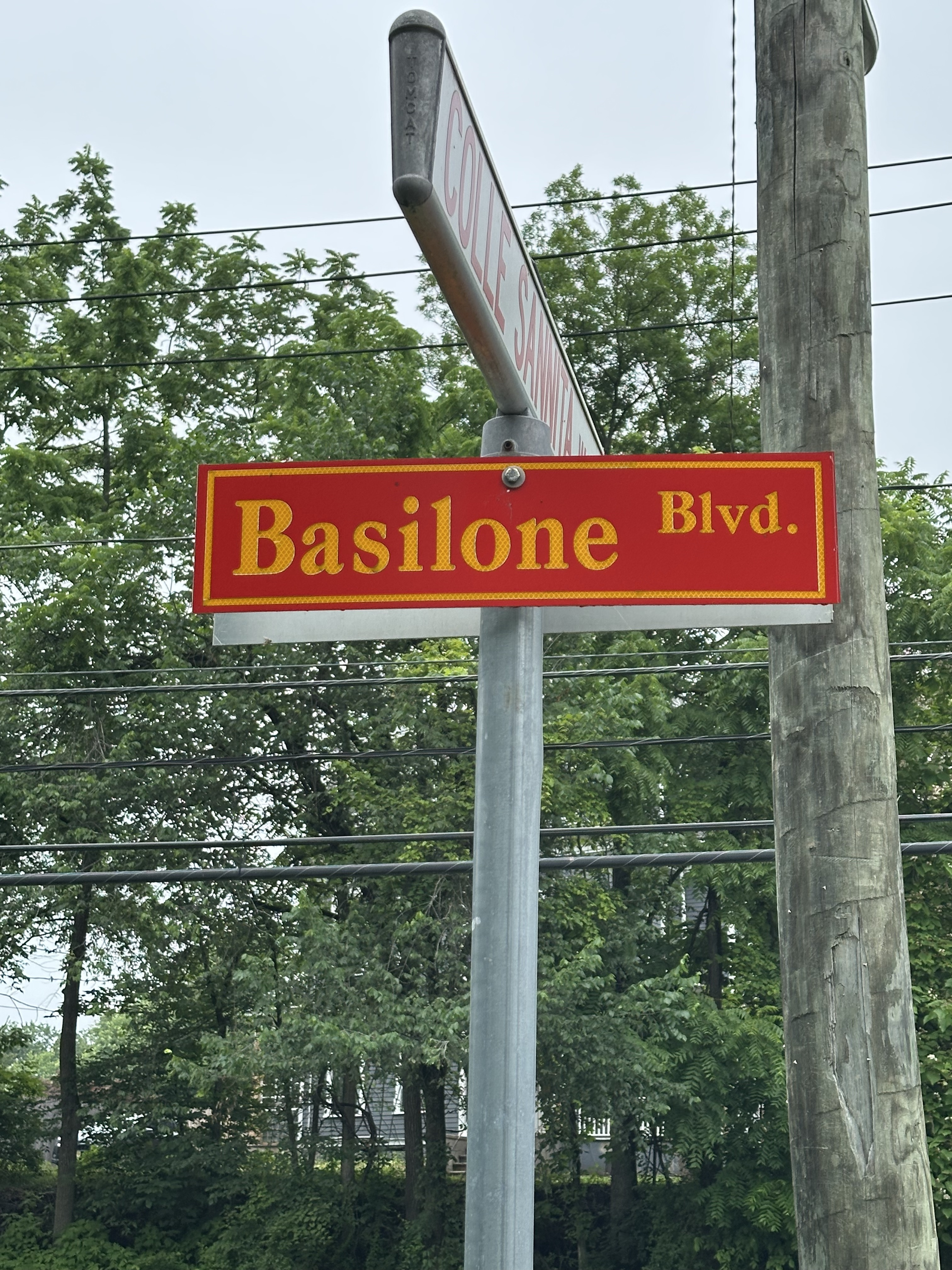
Basilone Boulevard sign in Raritan, New Jersey

- A memorial parade for Basilone has been held annually along Somerset Street in Raritan since 1981. In 2022, five blocks of West Somerset Street, including the section that passes John Basilone Memorial Park, were renamed "Basilone Boulevard."
- At Montclair State University, a residence hall is named after him.
- At Bridgewater-Raritan High School, the football field is called "Basilone Field". On the wall of the fieldhouse next to the field is a mural honoring Basilone. The annual Basilone Bowl, presented by the Somerset County Football Coaches Association and the Marine Corps, is a football game played by select seniors from Somerset County, New Jersey and supported by select cheerleaders from Somerset County and played on Basilone Field, and began in 2012.
- The Knights of Columbus Council #13264 in his hometown is named in his honor.
- An overpass at the Somerville Circle in Somerville, New Jersey, on U.S. Highway 202 and 206 that goes under it, is named for Basilone.

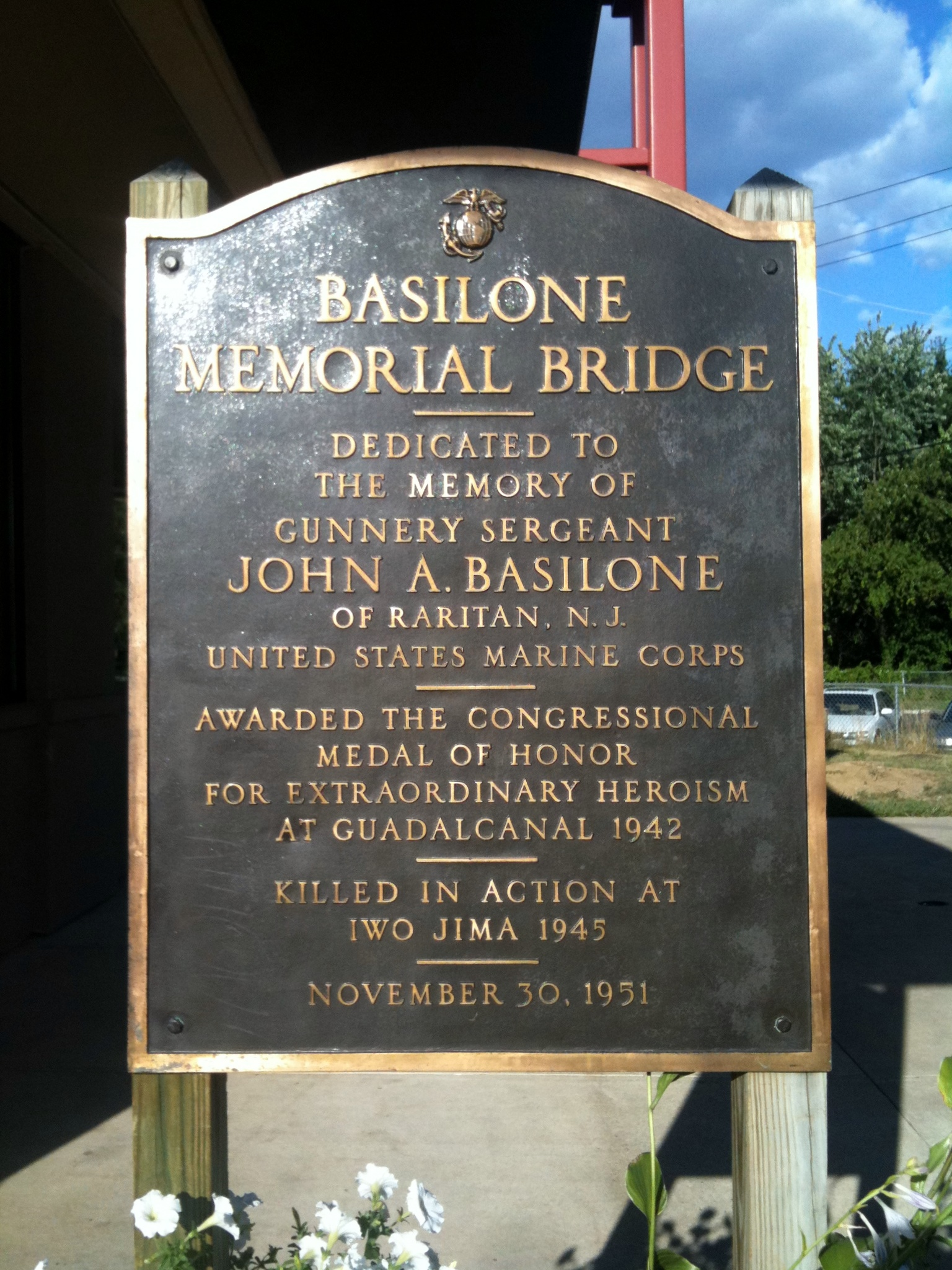
Dedication sign for the Basilone Memorial Bridge

- The New Jersey Turnpike bridge across the Raritan River is named the "Basilone Bridge."
- A connector road at the southwest of Newark Liberty International Airport, that connects to Earhart Drive, is named after Basilone.
- The John Basilone Veterans Memorial Bridge crosses the Raritan River, in Raritan, New Jersey, at First Avenue and Canal Street.
- A bust of Basilone is sited at Piazza Basilone, in Little Italy, San Diego, at Fir and India Streets. The war memorial there is dedicated to residents of Little Italy who served in World War II and Korean War.
- The Order of the Sons of Italy In America Lodge #2442 in Bohemia, New York, is named in his honor.
- The Basilone Room in Raritan Public Library is where memorabilia about him is kept.
- On November 10, 2005, the United States Postal Service issued "Distinguished Marines" stamps honoring four Marine Corps heroes, including Basilone.
- In 2011, Basilone was inducted into the New Jersey Hall of Fame.
- Basilone Road, at exit 71 of Interstate 5 from Los Angeles to San Diego, was named in his honor. It is nearest the access point to San Onofre State Beach, the now-decommissioned San Onofre Nuclear Generating Station, and the northern entrance to Marine Corps Base Camp Pendleton, through which it traverses across the northern portion of the base until terminating at Vandegraft Blvd.

== In media ==
HBO's 10-part miniseries The Pacific (2010) is based on the intertwined stories of Basilone and fellow Marines Robert Leckie and Eugene Sledge. Basilone is portrayed by actor Jon Seda.

== See also ==
- List of historically notable United States Marines
- List of Medal of Honor recipients for World War II
