= Part Nine (The Pacific) =

- The Pacific episode
- Episode no.: Episode 9
- Directed by: Tim Van Patten
- Written by: Bruce C. McKenna
- Cinematography by: Stephen F. Windon
- Editing by: Alan Cody; Marta Evry
- Original release date: May 9, 2010
- Running time: 58 minutes

Episode chronology
← Previous "Part Eight"	Next → "Part Ten"

"Part Nine", also known as "Okinawa", is the ninth episode of the American war drama miniseries The Pacific. The episode was written by co-executive producer Bruce C. McKenna, and directed by supervising producer Tim Van Patten. It originally aired on HBO on May 9, 2010.

The series focuses on the United States Marine Corps's actions in the Pacific Theater of Operations within the wider Pacific War. It primarily centers on the experiences of three Marines (Robert Leckie, Eugene Sledge, and John Basilone) who were in different regiments (1st, 5th, and 7th, respectively) of the 1st Marine Division. The episode follows the Division's role in the Battle of Okinawa, also exploring the feelings of hatred among the marines.

According to Nielsen Media Research, the episode was seen by an estimated 1.81 million household viewers and gained a 0.7 ratings share among adults aged 18–49. The episode received universal acclaim from critics, who praised the production values, extremely bleak tone, depiction of anti-Japanese sentiment, and performances.

== Plot ==
In May 1945, the 1st Marine Division makes its way through Okinawa one month after the start of the invasion. Sledge, now a Corporal, has become completely war-weary and disillusioned, as have most of the rest of his squad. The green Mac has also failed to be an effective leader, being hands-on at the wrong moments and making unilateral decisions. The mortar squad is also now joined by two replacement Privates, Tony "Cathy" Peck and Hamm. Peck, an irritable and ill-prepared draftee, quickly becomes the latest bullying target of Snafu and Leyden, but is unable to emotionally endure the taunting.

While swapping out positions with the beleaguered Army and seeing many Okinawans evacuate, the squad encounters a small group of prisoners of war on the side of the trail. They soon become hostile toward them, with Sledge repeatedly shoving one of the prisoners to the ground. As the Army intelligence officer overseeing them verbally threatens Sledge, Mac intervenes and de-escalates the situation, but warns Sledge that he will have him court-martialed if he attacks Japanese prisoners again.

As the days pass, Sledge and Snafu become increasingly exhausted and enraged with the Japanese. As they make their way through the hills, the unit is attacked when Japanese forces use civilians as human shields, with some carrying bombs in their clothing. They struggle in defending themselves from the attacks due to the weather, and the heavy Japanese offense. This breaks Sledge and Snafu, as they believe their orders led them to this predicament. Sledge begins to show deeper hatred toward the Japanese, executing a wounded Japanese soldier despite being ordered not to.

Later, Sledge and Snafu come across a dying woman with a baby, asking Sledge to end her suffering as the baby is taken away. Sledge contemplates pulling the trigger, but cannot bring himself to do it and instead stays with her, holding her as she dies. With his perspective changed, Sledge lets go of his hatred for the Japanese. He later spares a young, unarmed Japanese soldier, but gets enraged when another Marine executes the boy and then brags about it.

Three months later, Sledge, Snafu and Burgin leave for their new orders. They are informed by Mac that America used "a new bomb" against Japan, which "vaporized an entire city in the blink of an eye." They leave to eat, shaken after the revelation, while a Boeing B-29 Superfortress squadron flies overhead to perform an identical bombing.

== Production ==
=== Development ===
The episode was written by co-executive producer Bruce C. McKenna, and directed by supervising producer Tim Van Patten. This was McKenna's sixth writing credit, and Van Patten's third directing credit. In 2024, the episode's third script draft dated to July 10, 2006 was leaked online; at the time, the episode was to be titled "August 6, 1945", a reference to the date of the atomic bombing of Hiroshima. The leaks also revealed that George Pelecanos wrote the script's initial draft; he would go on to have no writing credits on the show, but was given a co-producer credit.

=== Historical sources ===
The episode is based on Sledge's memoir With the Old Breed. However, many of the events are changed from the memoir, either highlighting or downplaying the atrocities that Sledge witnessed in Okinawa. For example, while there are numerous accounts of the Japanese Army using Okinawans as human shields and making them undergo forced murder-suicides, Sledge does not describe witnessing this himself.

The characters of Peck and Hamm are composite characters meant to represent numerous replacements that were part of Sledge's company. Most notably, Peck's nickname of "Cathy" comes from a replacement who also had an affair with a woman named Cathy as Peck is described as having. Additionally, while Robert MacKenzie is a real commander of Sledge's, many of his characteristics in the show are combined with two other officers of Sledge's, 1st Lt. Thomas J. Stanley and one pseudonymously named by Sledge as "Shadow" in With the Old Breed; the former is still portrayed in the episode by Freddie Joe Farnsworth, who also served as one of the show's military advisors, while the latter is the source for most of Mac's negative traits in the episode.

The scene involving the old Okinawan woman played out differently from real-life. When Sledge declined to shoot her, he went outside to find a corpsman to help her. Upon finding one, however, the two of them heard a shot ring from the hut. Asking a Marine who walked out of the hut what he saw, he replied "Just some old woman who wanted me to put her out of her misery, so I obliged her", leaving Sledge and the corpsman furious at him. This was changed by McKenna in order to showcase more of Sledge's humanity via a tender moment that had previously been afforded in the episode, as well as to avoid blending in with the later scene involving the young Japanese soldier being executed, which also happened in real life.

== Reception ==
=== Viewers ===
In its original American broadcast, "Part Nine" was seen by an estimated 1.81 million household viewers with a 0.7 in the 18–49 demographics. This means that 0.7 percent of all households with televisions watched the episode. This was a 23% decrease in viewership from the previous episode, which was watched by 2.34 million household viewers with a 0.8 in the 18-49 demographics.

=== Critical reviews ===
"Part Nine" received universal acclaim. Ramsey Isler of IGN gave the episode a perfect "masterpiece" 10 out of 10 and wrote, "This is the last time we'll see combat in this series, and the producers definitely saved their best cinematic work for last. I don't think any other installment in this series sums up the war and its effects better than this one. It is a remarkable, unflinching story that leaves a lasting impression."

Emily St. James of The A.V. Club gave the episode an "A–" grade and wrote, "War is a balancing act for even the most hardened military man, the trick of seeing that your targets aren't people but that your targets are also all people. It's one of the great themes of war fiction that soldiers who are out in the muck too long eventually end up nearly losing their souls, and tonight, The Pacific finally got around to dramatizing that sort of story with Sledge and Snafu as our guides."

Alan Sepinwall of HitFix wrote, "The episode's time on Okinawa ends not long after Eugene has his moment of clarity, so it's entirely possible he would have gone back to his amoral bloodlust. But the episode, and the island conflict, ends in time for Sledge to leave it a shattered man, but not a monstrous one." Tim Basham of Paste wrote, "I originally had my doubts about Joseph Mazello as Sledge at the beginning of the series. But now I love the guy — he and his commanding officer butt heads in this episode, contrasting his relationship with the late Capt. Haldane."

Paul MacInnes of The Guardian wrote, "Episode nine addresses directly an issue that has been hinted at throughout the series and in interviews – that there was a great depth of hatred for the Japanese among American soldiers and that it resulted in brutality on the battlefield." Den of Geek wrote, "Never afraid to show the brutality of war, The Pacific really went into overdrive this time, with an episode that was equally horrific, gripping and downright affecting."

=== Accolades ===
The episode received four Primetime Emmy Award nominations, including Outstanding Directing for a Miniseries, Movie or a Dramatic Special for Van Patten, which it lost to Temple Grandin.
