= Part Seven (The Pacific) =

- The Pacific episode
- Episode no.: Episode 7
- Directed by: Tim Van Patten
- Written by: Bruce C. McKenna
- Cinematography by: Remi Adefarasin
- Editing by: Alan Cody; Marta Evry
- Original release date: April 25, 2010
- Running time: 55 minutes

Episode chronology
← Previous "Part Six"	Next → "Part Eight"

"Part Seven", also known as "Peleliu Hills", is the seventh episode of the American war drama miniseries The Pacific. The episode was written by co-executive producer Bruce C. McKenna, and directed by supervising producer Tim Van Patten. It originally aired on HBO on April 25, 2010.

The series focuses on the United States Marine Corps's actions in the Pacific Theater of Operations within the wider Pacific War. It primarily centers on the experiences of three Marines (Robert Leckie, Eugene Sledge, and John Basilone) who were in different regiments (1st, 5th, and 7th, respectively) of the 1st Marine Division. The episode follows the 5th Marine Regiment as they prepare to reach Bloody Nose Ridge, despite the heavy Japanese defense.

According to Nielsen Media Research, the episode was seen by an estimated 2.55 million household viewers and gained a 0.9 ratings share among adults aged 18–49. The episode received critical acclaim, with critics praising the exploration of post-traumatic stress disorder and grief.

== Plot ==
In October 1944, the 5th Marine Regiment continues the campaign at Peleliu. Haldane gives them instructions to prepare to move to Bloody Nose Ridge the following day. In Kansas City, Missouri, Basilone continues his war bonds tour. However, Basilone is still haunted by the memories of war, impacting his performance at golf.

Jones and Burgin lead the Marines to the ridge, facing multiple gunfire encounters. Sledge tries to care for a temporarily-blinded Leyden, but is almost killed by a Japanese with a sword until he shoots him at close range. Despite the casualties, the unit is ordered to continue in the Hills, where more Marines die. As they retrieve the fallen, Jones passes away from his wounds, and Burgin announces that Haldane died as well when a Japanese sniper shot him while assessing the area of Hill 140, devastating the unit.

Sledge continues losing motivation during fight. He almost removes the gold teeth from a dead Japanese soldier, until Snafu points out the germs inside them, prompting Sledge to instead take his insignia. With the unit finally winning the airfield, they depart the island. In Pavuvu, Sledge is still disturbed by the events at Peleliu. When they return, they find American Red Cross nurses casually offering the soldiers grapefruit juice, stunning Sledge with the sheer dissonance. Haldane's replacement, 2nd Lt. Robert "Mac" MacKenzie, mistakes this for Sledge ogling the nurse and lightly teases him about it, but stops when Sledge looks at him. Afterwards, Sledge decides to join his unit in skinny dipping at the beach.

== Production ==
=== Development ===
The episode was written by co-executive producer Bruce C. McKenna, and directed by supervising producer Tim Van Patten. This was McKenna's fifth writing credit, and Van Patten's second directing credit. In 2024, the episode's third script draft dated to May 24, 2006 was leaked online; at the time, the episode was to be titled "Semper Fi", a reference to the Marines' colloquial use of the semper fidelis motto. At the time, the episode was written by Robert Schenkkan, and the majority of its content was instead used for the eighth episode.

=== Historical sources ===
The episode is based on Sledge's memoir With the Old Breed. Rather than on Peleilu itself, Sledge's encounter with the pillbox occurred on Ngesebus. While the sequence of Sledge witnessing a soldier casually throwing rocks into the freshly caved-in skull of a Japanese soldier - only for that same soldier to dissuade him from trophy hunting another Japanese's soldier's gold-plated teeth - did actually occur, it was not Shelton who did this but rather a Navy corpsman named Ken "Doc" Caswell, who is omitted from the series but ironically mentioned by Shelton in the same scene.

== Reception ==
=== Viewers ===
In its original American broadcast, "Part Seven" was seen by an estimated 2.55 million household viewers with a 0.9 in the 18–49 demographics. This means that 0.9 percent of all households with televisions watched the episode. This was a 7% increase in viewership from the previous episode, which was watched by 2.38 million household viewers with a 0.8 in the 18-49 demographics.

=== Critical reviews ===
"Part Seven" received critical acclaim. Ramsey Isler of IGN gave the episode an "amazing" 9 out of 10 and wrote, "In general, although this is another battlefield-centric story, it manages to combine the battles with poignant storytelling that goes beyond the graphic loss of life and explores the other things our nation's fighters lost in this war: great leaders, morality, and even hope."

Emily St. James of The A.V. Club gave the episode an "A" grade and wrote, "Last week's hour of The Pacific was harrowing, but this week's hour was just a straight-up, grueling nightmare. This is the episode that most accurately captures the sense of these men that their slow advancement across Peleliu is costing too many lives, is a slog they may never wake up from. The hour tries to undercut some of this by cutting away to Basilone stateside or with that ending set at the nearly hallucinatory home away from home of Pavuvu. The shot of Sledge regarding the nurse and the glass of lemonade and seeming almost ready to throw it back in her face said as much about the cost of a grueling battle like Peleliu than any monologue could have. This was some incredibly strong stuff."

Alan Sepinwall of The Star-Ledger wrote, "Because we spent a fair amount of time with Sledge as a naive kid eager to go to war to prove himself, it's far more striking to now see him as the veteran who leaves Peleliu haunted by what he saw and did there. The Sledge of Mobile would have looked at those women in white and then sheepishly averted his eyes when called on it; the Sledge of Peleliu was able to scare off another man in uniform with his stare. Terrific work by Joseph Mazzello throughout." Tim Basham of Paste wrote, "At the risk of being a broken record, enough cannot be said about the care put into the authenticity of The Pacific. Not since HBO's Deadwood has a TV production spent so much effort into making it real, an effort that's paying off."

Paul MacInnes of The Guardian wrote, "As the softy from Alabama has become the Sledgehammer, so the passing of Gunny's lighter is also the passing of a torch." Den of Geek wrote, "The final struggle for Peleliu begins in the latest episode of The Pacific, and it is, by far, the most visually and psychologically grim depiction of the war yet, and possibly ever in a mainstream show."
