= Part Eight (The Pacific) =

- The Pacific episode
- Episode no.: Episode 8
- Directed by: David Nutter; Jeremy Podeswa
- Written by: Robert Schenkkan; Michelle Ashford
- Cinematography by: Stephen F. Windon
- Editing by: Alan Cody
- Original release date: May 2, 2010
- Running time: 57 minutes

Episode chronology
← Previous "Part Seven"	Next → "Part Nine"

"Part Eight", also known as "Iwo Jima", is the eighth episode of the American war drama miniseries The Pacific. The episode was written by co-producers Robert Schenkkan and Michelle Ashford, and directed by David Nutter and Jeremy Podeswa. It originally aired on HBO on May 2, 2010.

The series focuses on the United States Marine Corps's actions in the Pacific Theater of Operations within the wider Pacific War. It primarily centers on the experiences of three Marines (Robert Leckie, Eugene Sledge, and John Basilone) who were in different regiments (1st, 5th, and 7th, respectively) of the 1st Marine Division. The episode follows Basilone's insatisfaction with his post-war status, and his decision to become involved again with the Marines.

According to Nielsen Media Research, the episode was seen by an estimated 2.34 million household viewers and gained a 0.8 ratings share among adults aged 18–49. The episode received critical acclaim, with critics praising the performances, production values and themes.

== Plot ==
In Pavuvu, The 1st Marine Division recovers after the events at Peleliu. Sledge becomes upset when he sees Mac throwing away several of Haldane's belongings, and fishes a book out of the trash that he decides to keep. Shortly afterwards, De L'Eau tells Sledge and Snafu that he was transferred to a new division, fearing their role in a more dangerous military tactic.

In New York City, Basilone continues selling war bonds by participating in many campaigns, such as on NBC Radio Network with two of his brothers. Later, he returns to Raritan and reunites with his family, but he is unhappy with his new life. He talks with Lieutenant General Alexander Vandegrift to express his dissatisfaction. Vandegrift suggests reducing his service, but Basilone clarifies that he wants to be more involved with the Marines again and, as a compromise to not being able to serve on the front lines, asks to become an instructor instead, which Vandegrift accepts.

Basilone is subsequently transferred to the newly-formed Marine Corps Base Camp Pendleton, but discovers that most of the recruits have not yet been assigned to the camp and for a while is put in charge of just two teenagers, Chuck Tatum and Clifford "Steve" Evanson, the former of whom recognizes Basilone. As more subordinates join over time, Basilone becomes smitten with a Marines nurse, whose friend invites him to a social event. There, he learns that her name is Sergeant Lena Riggi and takes an interest in her. He invites her to dine with him, but she is initially not interested in a new relationship. Eventually though, the two begin to bond over their shared love of the Marines, and eventually become lovers.

As time passes, Basilone continues his duties while growing closer to Riggi. While his service is over, Basilone decides to re-enlist to continue fighting in the Pacific. Riggi is disappointed, but understands his decision. Before he leaves, they decide to get married and enjoy their honeymoon. After making love, Riggi gives Basilone her necklace for him to wear while he is on service.

On February 19, 1945, Basilone and his soldiers land at Iwo Jima. Despite Basilone's leadership, the unit faces severe losses on the first day. The unit makes its way through the battlefield despite heavy gunfire. As Basilone tries to lead his men back to the beach, he is killed by gunfire, shocking Tatum and Evanson. In America, Riggi visits the beach she and Basilone frequented, crying over her husband's death.

== Production ==
=== Development ===
The episode was written by co-producers Robert Schenkkan and Michelle Ashford, and directed by David Nutter and Jeremy Podeswa. This was Schenkkan's third writing credit, Ashford's second writing credit, Nutter's second directing credit, and Podeswa's second directing credit.

=== Historical sources ===
In addition to historical, military, and interview sources about Basilone, Tatum's memoir Red Blood, Black Sand was used as a basis for the episode.

The scene of Basilone first encountering Riggi at the mess hall is invented for the episode; in reality, they first met at the hotel bar.

There are conflicting accounts about the circumstances of Basilone's death. Initial military reports say that Basilone almost single-handedly fought the pillbox on Iwo Jima, and was killed by shrapnel. However, Red Blood, Black Sand details him fighting alongside Tatum and the rest of his squad, and was killed by enemy rifle fire, something that was later corroborated by Hugh Ambrose in his book The Pacific; their accounts were utilized for the series.

Later on the same day as Basilone's death, Tatum would rescue Evanson, which earned him a Bronze Star Medal with a Combat "V", only for Evanson to still be killed the very next day. Tatum would later be injured and evacuated from Iwo Jima, not serving in the war afterwards. These events are not depicted in the show, but are alluded to in the closing titles of the series finale.

== Reception ==
=== Viewers ===
In its original American broadcast, "Part Eight" was seen by an estimated 2.34 million household viewers with a 0.8 in the 18–49 demographics. This means that 0.8 percent of all households with televisions watched the episode. This was a 9% decrease in viewership from the previous episode, which was watched by 2.55 million household viewers with a 0.9 in the 18-49 demographics.

=== Critical reviews ===
"Part Eight" received critical acclaim. Ramsey Isler of IGN gave the episode a "great" 8.2 out of 10 and wrote, "There's been a lot of debate surrounding the slower "character development" episodes of this series. Those who were looking for a gritty, bloody chronicle of the hardships of war have been critical of The Pacific's extended departures from the battlefield in a war series, while others grow weary of rampant bloodshed and appreciate the cinematic human elements of the story and enjoy getting to know the personal effects of the war. Although episodes like this one can understandably turn off some viewers, the quality of this story can't be denied, even if it wasn't quite what you're looking for."

Emily St. James of The A.V. Club gave the episode an "A" grade and wrote, "I'm sure many will question just why the series, which had been building up a head of steam, would choose to follow up hours of almost pure intensity with what amounts to a doomed romance, but the hour took on an emotional intensity of its own. I was horrified and amazed by much of the last two episodes, but I don't know that I ever found them as deeply moving as I found this simple story about love and duty."

Alan Sepinwall of The Star-Ledger wrote, "the final shot of the Iwo Jima sequence - with the camera pulling up to show Basilone lying among so many other dead men - was a potent reminder of the hundreds upon thousands of less famous Americans died under similar circumstances to the great John Basilone, and how many of them left their own version of Lena behind." Tim Basham of Paste wrote, "All the while, Basilone is at the center. We see his determined resolve to accomplish his task, but we also see the results of how well he has trained those around him. And it is the anguish on their faces that brings us to tears when their revered sergeant finally falls."

Paul MacInnes of The Guardian wrote, "It's fair to say that this week's final scenes are not typical of those that have gone before. On more than the odd occasion, the makers of The Pacific seem to have prized verisimilitude above all else, including engaging their audience. The drama has sometimes been slow, at other times chaotic, but always tending towards docudrama. With the death of Basilone, however, the rules were suddenly changed. Effects and tricks were applied to make sure that heartstrings were tugged. And quite right too." Den of Geek wrote, "Understated in its exploration of their commitment to both each other and the service, episode 8 of The Pacific serves as fine testament to the many war-time romances that ended in tragedy, made even more poignant by the fact that Lena never remarried."

=== Accolades ===
The episode received four Primetime Emmy Award nominations, including Outstanding Directing for a Miniseries, Movie or a Dramatic Special for Nutter and Podeswa and Outstanding Writing for a Miniseries, Movie or a Dramatic Special for Schenkkan and Ashford. It lost the former to Temple Grandin and the latter to You Don't Know Jack.
