= Part Ten (The Pacific) =

- The Pacific episode
- Episode no.: Episode 10
- Directed by: Jeremy Podeswa
- Written by: Bruce C. McKenna; Robert Schenkkan
- Cinematography by: Stephen F. Windon
- Editing by: Alan Cody
- Original release date: May 16, 2010
- Running time: 61 minutes

Episode chronology
| ← Previous "Part Nine" | Next → — |

"Part Ten", also known as "Home", is the tenth and final episode of the American war drama miniseries The Pacific. The episode was written by co-executive producer Bruce C. McKenna and co-producer Robert Schenkkan, and directed by Jeremy Podeswa. It originally aired on HBO on May 16, 2010.

The series focuses on the United States Marine Corps's actions in the Pacific Theater of Operations within the wider Pacific War. It primarily centers on the experiences of three Marines (Robert Leckie, Eugene Sledge, and John Basilone) who were in different regiments (1st, 5th, and 7th, respectively) of the 1st Marine Division. The episode follows the return of the Marines to their home after the end of the War.

According to Nielsen Media Research, the episode was seen by an estimated 1.96 million household viewers and gained a 0.7 ratings share among adults aged 18–49. The episode received critical acclaim, with critics praising the closure to the series and its exploration of the post-war effects.

== Plot ==
In August 1945, Leckie is recovering at a military hospital, when the nurses start celebrating the announcement that Japan has surrendered, finally ending the War. In Okinawa, the Marines celebrate the announcement, while Sledge, Snafu and Burgin wonder about their future in America.

Lena visits Basilone's parents, giving them his Medal of Honor. The Marines board a train to return home; Burgin leaves in Jewett, Texas, while Snafu leaves in New Orleans, although they are unsure if they will see each other again. Sledge returns to Mobile, Alabama, where he is picked up by Phillips at the train station, and reunites with his parents but experiences recurring nightmares. Leckie moves back with his parents in New Jersey, and gets a new job as a reporter for the Bergen County Record. Seeing Vera across the street, Leckie wears his Marine dress uniform and visits her, convincing her to dine with him. While dining, Leckie explains his actions in the war, revealing that he wrote her letters that he never sent in the belief that he would die in the war and that the letters would therefore not matter. Leckie's relationship with Vera deepens as time passes.

Sledge is reluctant to wear his military uniform, unwilling to relive the memories of war. At a society ball, he and Phillips talk about their return home, with Phillips encouraging him to try to move on for the sake of their families. After struggling to enroll in college, Sledge is taken on a hunting trip by his father. However, he ends up breaking down in tears, unable to bring himself to shoot and kill. His father consoles him, embracing him and assuring him that their family will always support him through anything.

The series ends with a montage that reveals the fate of the real-life characters, alongside real photographs.

== Production ==
=== Development ===
The episode was written by co-executive producer Bruce C. McKenna and co-producer Robert Schenkkan, and directed by Jeremy Podeswa. This was McKenna's seventh writing credit, Schenkkan's fourth writing credit, and Podeswa's third directing credit. In 2024, the episode's second script draft was leaked online; at the time, the episode was to be titled "Homecomings".

=== Historical sources ===
The episode takes some of its material from Sledge's memoir China Marine. Events regarding Leckie and Basilone were invented for the episode.

In the 2006 draft, Sledge's and Phillips' conversation outside the ball was to also feature the two of them meeting Walter "Smokey" Gordon of Easy Company, with Ben Caplan likely reprising his portrayal of him in Band of Brothers. Also omitted were scenes of an older Sledge with his wife, Jeanne, and teaching at Alabama College.

The closing credits say that Sledge was one of the pallbearers at Shelton's funeral. This was later debunked by Sledge's son Henry.

== Reception ==
=== Viewers ===
In its original American broadcast, "Part Ten" was seen by an estimated 1.96 million household viewers with a 0.7 in the 18–49 demographics. This means that 0.7 percent of all households with televisions watched the episode. This was a 8% increase in viewership from the previous episode, which was watched by 1.81 million household viewers with a 0.7 in the 18-49 demographics.

=== Critical reviews ===
"Part Ten" received critical acclaim. Ramsey Isler of IGN gave the episode a "great" 8 out of 10 and wrote, "Although there were many debatable choices in the earlier parts of the episode, the ending was everything it should have been, and serves as a very good conclusion to this remarkable series."

Emily St. James of The A.V. Club gave the episode an "A" grade and wrote, ""Part Ten" is slower moving than any other chapter, and it's deliberately contemplative. On its surface, it's a simple story of what these men sacrificed for the betterment of humanity, but there are other things going on as well. If the main character of The Pacific is the Pacific, then this is the first episode where the Pacific barely appears. In a way, it's about how the Pacific is now a part of these men, the way that it infects them, destroying some and sparing others."

Alan Sepinwall of HitFix wrote, "after 65 years of Hollywood giving us variations on the war in Europe, McKenna, Yost, Hanks, Spielberg and company have given us 10 graphic, gripping, haunting hours of The Pacific to give us a sense of why so many were reluctant to show us this half of 'the good war.' Well done, gentlemen (both the Marines and the filmmakers). Well done, indeed." Tim Basham of Paste wrote, "The war is over. And so ends HBO's spectacular miniseries The Pacific. Leaving the bloodshed to earlier episodes, a peaceful conclusion follow the show's main characters as they make their way to their respective homes."

Paul MacInnes of The Guardian wrote, "One of the programme's main aims was surely to achieve a clearer understanding of the horrors of the war against Japan amongst its audience. I'd say, on these terms alone, The Pacific was a success." Den of Geek wrote, "Never the most conventional of war shows, The Pacific finishes its mightily impressive run by eschewing traditional fist-pumping scenes of final martial victory, instead taking a long and thoughtful look at what happens afterwards, and how the peace can often be as hard as the war."

=== Accolades ===
The episode received two Primetime Emmy Award nominations, including for Outstanding Writing for a Miniseries, Movie or a Dramatic Special for Schenkkan and McKenna, which it lost to You Don't Know Jack.
