= Egg tossing =

Game associated with Easter

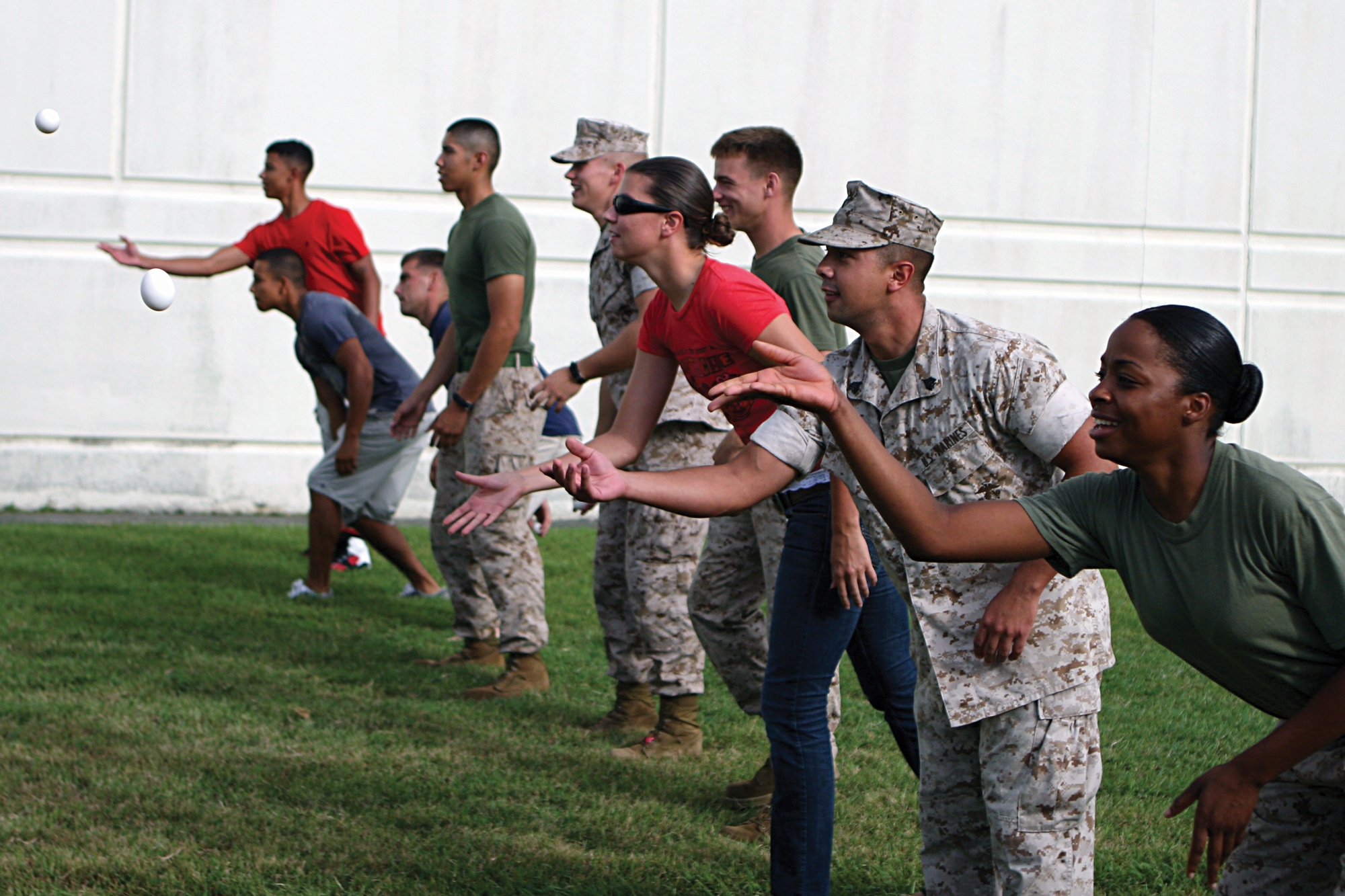
U.S. Marines and sailors participate in an egg-toss competition at the Commissary Commando competition held at the Camp Foster commissary

Egg tossing or egg throwing is a game associated with Easter. Various types of such games exist, common ones involve throwing an egg so that it lands on the ground without breaking. Such a contest may be known as an egg toss.

== History ==
In Christianity, for the celebration of Eastertide, Easter eggs symbolize the empty tomb of Jesus, from which he was resurrected. Additionally, eggs carry a Trinitarian significance, with shell, yolk, and albumen being three parts of one egg. During Lent, the season of repentance that precedes Easter, eggs along with meat, lacticinia, and wine are foods that are traditionally abstained from, a practice that continues in Eastern Christianity and among certain Western Christian congregations that do the Daniel Fast.

In medieval Britain there was an egg throwing festival held in the churches at Easter. The priest would give out one hard-boiled egg which was tossed around the nave of the church and the choirboy who was holding the egg when the clock struck twelve would get to keep it.

In one version of the game the idea is to toss an egg so it falls on the ground without breaking. This is possible on, for example, grassy meadows. In Germany, children invented a way to spin the egg during the toss so that it lands on its tip still spinning.

Dutch children play a game called "egg sales" in which one child sells an egg to another. The new owner then throws the egg in the grass and if it does not break it must be returned to the seller.

== Gameplay ==
Egg tossing is also known as a team competition with basically the following rules, although the exact details may vary. One member of a two-person team tosses an egg to another. If the egg does not break, they step apart and the toss is repeated. The contest continues until one egg is left unbroken. (A popular variation uses water balloons.)

== Records ==
On July 4, 2011, in Grangeville, Idaho, the world record for the number of persons participating in an egg toss was set, with 2,130 persons participating.

An egg throwing feat was recorded in the Guinness Book of World Records: on November 12, 1978, Johnny Dell Foley successfully tossed a fresh hen's egg for a distance of 323 ft 2in (98.51m) to a Keith Thomas at Jewett, Texas. Since 2000 the feat is no longer listed in the book.

The Hagerstown Suns have hosted the annual National Egg Toss Championship since 2005.

A World Egg Throwing Federation championship is held in Swaton, England each year on the last Sunday in June since 2006.

== See also ==
- Egg rolling
- Egg tapping
- Egg dance
- Egg hunt
- Pace Egg play
