= China Marine (memoir) =

Book by Eugene Sledge

China Marine: An Infantryman's Life after World War II
- Cover of the book
- Author: Eugene B. Sledge
- Language: English
- Genre: Military Memoir
- Publisher: University of Alabama Press
- Publication date: May 10, 2002
- Publication place: United States
- Media type: Print
- Pages: 167 pp.
- ISBN: 0-8173-1161-0
- Dewey Decimal: 940.54'1273-dc21
- LC Class: D811 .S548 2002
- Preceded by: With the Old Breed: At Peleliu and Okinawa

China Marine: An Infantryman's Life after World War II is the second memoir written by United States Marine Corporal Eugene B. Sledge, published posthumously with foreword by Stephen E. Ambrose, without subtitle, on May 10, 2002 by University of Alabama Press It was republished in paperback with the full title by Oxford University Press in July 2003. This book is the sequel to his first, better known, memoir, With the Old Breed: At Peleliu and Okinawa and Ambrose identifies it as the only account of the Marines stationed in postwar China. It has recently achieved wider public recognition as credited source material for the 2010 HBO miniseries The Pacific, particularly its tenth episode.

China Marine details Sledge's military duty in Okinawa after the battle to capture the islands, postwar service in the U.S. occupation of China, return to Mobile, Alabama and reintegration to civilian society. It contains brief accounts of the postwar Chinese political situation including a re-telling of Sledge's previously published account of the incident at Lang Fang, an armed confrontation between "two opposing Chinese forces" and Japanese who had not yet been evacuated from the country.

However the book's primary focus is the process of psychological rehabilitation of the author as he recovered from the horrors of his combat experience. Thus much of its content is deeply personal, such as his first meetings with his brother and parents and a disturbing incident at Auburn University where he realized the distance between his experience and that of those who had not been in the war.

== Synopsis ==
=== Okinawa ===
Sledge's second book opens in 1945 with the First Marine Division remaining in Okinawa after the 82-day battle to clean up and prepare for their anticipated invasion of "Yokosuka Naval Base at the mouth of Tokyo Bay". None of the Marines expected to survive such an invasion. After the atomic bombings and Japan's precipitous surrender they did not celebrate, but rather were kept busy by a return to the intense manual labor of cleanup. In Sledge's words, "I think we were actually afraid to believe it was true...The memory of so many dead friends was still fresh in our minds."

Life in Okinawa improved considerably as the Marines became accustomed to their unexpectedly favourable circumstances. They spent their free time watching films, reading books and engaging in practical jokes, a pastime they referred to as "smokestacking", often directed at newly arrived replacement troops. Even otherwise dangerous events such as a typhoon (see 1945 Pacific typhoon season) which struck Okinawa were easily weathered.

=== China ===
Sledge's battalion was shipped to Beijing (then known as Peking), China instead of being sent home. Initially this was an exciting experience as Sledge and the others were exposed to the complexities of Chinese culture, enjoying the rich experience as well as the pastimes of garrison duty. "Smokestacking" was expanded to include the Chinese with practices such as gazing at nonexistent objects in the sky until they were surrounded by huge crowds of onlookers all straining to see. Sledge met a number of people who influenced his direction in life, in particular a Flemish priest, Father Marcel von Hemelryjck, and the family of Dr. Y.K. Soong.

All was not tourism and fun during the China occupation and conditions worsened through the months. Sledge had a number of tense encounters while on guard duty and was witness to political events such as an incident at Lang Fang; stress rose as strife between Chinese factions grew. By 1946 some of the Marines were very close to insubordination and others took to drinking. One of Sledge's buddies, a Cape Gloucester veteran, became disorderly and was beaten down by Military Police then put in the brig.

=== America ===
As morale continued to deteriorate the Marines were rotated home under the military demobilization point system. Sledge was sent back to Alabama for his discharge in early 1946 to start a prolonged process of adjustment to civilian life. In his words, "My adjustment to civilian life was not easy," and he marveled at such simple amenities as dry socks and the absence of fleas. He had emotional support from his mother, his brother who had been an officer in the European war and his father, who had been an Army physician during World War I.

He describes how he retained his wry sense of humor but he remained disturbed at the lack of understanding expressed by civilians. His incident at Auburn University was typical. A young staff member at the registrar's office called on him to list his military training courses then asked him if the Marines had taught him anything important. She could not comprehend the relevance of his training until he explained the twin facts that the United States Marines had trained him specifically to kill enemy soldiers and that most of his own friends and associates had been killed or wounded by the enemy. Sledge's opinion was, "(W)ar to this lady meant John Wayne or the sweet musical South Pacific... I felt like some sort of alien, and I realized that this sort of thing would confront me the rest of my days."

=== "Epilogue: I Am Not the Man I Would have Been" ===
Sledge went on to college, married and embarked on a long career as a biologist and teacher. He did find healing of a sort in his parents' love, his marriage and his academic work but he never forgave the soldiers of the Empire of Japan. He denied regret for the men he had shot but regretted the ones he had missed. (This is in contrast to his earlier description of mixed emotions described when he killed a man face to face in the Battle of Peleliu, and to his description of empathy toward birds and animals to the point where he gave up his long term hobby of hunting.)

He expressed concern over historical revisionism about the Pacific War and what he termed might have been a "Rape of Nanking" in American cities if the Japanese had not been defeated. This was his opinion as a man who tried to live with the Socratic ideal of self-knowledge: "There is no 'mellowing' for me - that would be to forgive all the atrocities the Japanese committed against millions of Asians and thousands of Americans. To 'mellow' is to forget."

== See also ==
- Combat stress reaction
- On Killing: The Psychological Cost of Learning to Kill in War and Society
