= WETF =

WETF may refer to:

- WisdomTree Investments (NASDAQ: WETF), a New York-based finance company
- Weightless Environment Training Facility, a neutral buoyancy facility at NASA's Johnson Space Center
- World Egg Throwing Federation, a UK organization that promotes the sport of egg throwing
- WETF-LP, a low-power radio station (105.7 FM) licensed to serve South Bend, Indiana, United States
