= National Egg Toss Championship =

The National Egg Toss Championship is an annual egg tossing contest held by the Hagerstown Suns. The first event was held in 2005.

== Champions ==
2005 – Jason Rhea and Naoyuki Mizuguchi

2011 – Wells Winegar and Yaj Jacobs
