= Swaton =

Village and civil parish in the North Kesteven district of Lincolnshire, England

Coordinates: 52.922246°N 0.317665°W

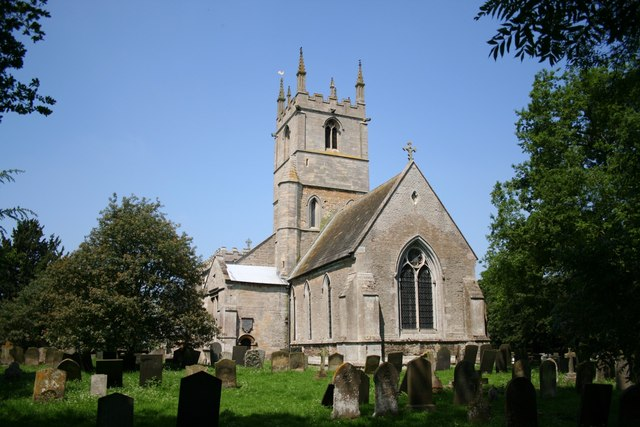
- St Michael's Church, Swaton

- Location within Lincolnshire
- Population: 184 (2001)
- OS grid reference: TF132374
  - London: 100 mi (160 km) S
- District: North Kesteven
- Shire county: Lincolnshire
- Region: East Midlands
- Country: England
- Sovereign state: United Kingdom
- Post town: Sleaford
- Postcode district: NG34
- Police: Lincolnshire
- Fire: Lincolnshire
- Ambulance: East Midlands
- UK Parliament: Sleaford and North Hykeham

Swaton is a village and civil parish in the North Kesteven district of Lincolnshire, England. It is situated on the B1394 road, less than 0.5 miles (0.8 km) north from the A52 road, and 6 miles (9.7 km) south-east of Sleaford. Swaton Fen lies to the east.

The Swaton Eau river rises to the west and runs through the village until it joins the South Forty-Foot Drain. Before the draining of the Fens the Swaton Eau was navigable and a large inland port existed close to the current bridge. The Roman Car Dyke runs to the east of the village. Roman brick pits remain.

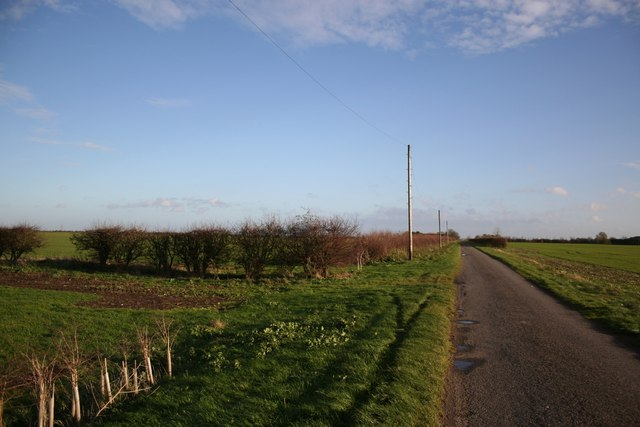
Swaton Fen

The name comes from "Suavetone" or "Swaffa’s Farmstead".

The cruciform Church of St Michael is a Grade I listed building.

Nichola de la Haye, a lady who served as High Sheriff of Lincolnshire for King John, died in Swaton on 20 November 1230.

In 1240 William II Longespée and his wife Idonea, Nichola's granddaughter, applied for and were granted a royal charter to run a Friday market in the village. This grant was unsuccessfully challenged by residents of Folkingham and Sleaford who feared it would damage their own Saturday and Monday markets.

Swaton Vintage Day is held each June. The village also hosts the annual World Egg Throwing competition. Egg throwing in this village started c. 1322 when the new Abbot of Swaton, controlling all poultry in the village, used them to provide eggs as alms to those that attended church. When the Eau was in flood these were hurled over the swollen river to waiting peasants.
