= World Egg Throwing Federation =

Sports organization

- Abbreviation: WETF
- Formation: 2006
- Purpose: Egg throwing in the UK
- Headquarters: Swaton, Lincolnshire
- Region served: UK
- Website: http://www.eggthrowing.com

The World Egg Throwing Federation is an organization that promotes the sport of egg throwing. It promotes a number of different variations of games including Russian egg roulette, throw and catch, static relay, target throwing and egg trebuchet. The organization discourages the use of eggs in the role of vandalism. The championship has been held annually in Swaton, England since 2006.

== History ==
World Egg Throwing Federation first staged in 2004.And the current world record of 309 ft (94.3m) was achieved by a team from New Zealand in 2016.

In June 2024, World Egg Throwing Championships returns to Swaton.
