= Merriell Shelton =

United States Marine

- Born: Merriell Allesandro Shelton; January 21, 1922
- Died: May 3, 1993 (aged 71); Jackson, Louisiana, U.S.
- Burial place: Bowman-Dedon Cemetery, West Feliciana Parish, Louisiana, U.S.
- Spouse: Gladys Bowman-Shelton
- Children: 2 sons
- Military career
- Allegiance: United States
- Branch: United States Marine Corps
- Service years: 1942–1946
- Rank: Corporal
- Nickname: Snafu
- Units: K Company, 3rd Battalion, 5th Marines, 1st Marine Division
- Conflicts: World War II: Battle of Cape Gloucester; Battle of Peleliu; Battle of Okinawa

Merriell Allesandro "Snafu" Shelton (January 21, 1922 – May 3, 1993) was a United States Marine who served in the Pacific theater during World War II. He is depicted in the 1981 memoir With the Old Breed: At Peleliu and Okinawa by Eugene Sledge which chronicled their combat experiences. He was also depicted in the HBO miniseries The Pacific (2010), in which he was portrayed by Rami Malek.

== Biography ==
=== Early life ===
Merriell Shelton was born on January 21, 1922, in Louisiana, to Joseph Price Shelton and Ann/Anna (Sherwood) Shelton. Of Cajun descent, Shelton was described as speaking with a "thick accent". He served in the Civilian Conservation Corps in his youth.

=== Military career ===
Shelton enlisted in the Marine Corps in 1942 and completed boot camp in San Diego. He was assigned to K Company, 3rd Battalion, 5th Marines, 1st Marine Division (K/3/5) and served as a mortar man. He participated in the Battle of Cape Gloucester alongside Romus Burgin.

In the book The Marines at Peleliu, 1944--The Bloodiest Battle of the Pacific War, author Bill Sloan describes Shelton as a "whiz at poker, but otherwise his talents involved getting confused, lost, in trouble, and generally fouled up. He would argue about anything at the slightest opportunity, and when he was agitated or inebriated, all those tendencies grew more pronounced. They were also magnified by Shelton's inability to speak understandable English at such times". Sloan also describes how Shelton gained his nickname of "Snafu" after a fellow Marine asked him how much money he had while they were on a train in Melbourne:

"I t'ink I got maybe aroun' two pounds and ten ounces-plenty for some drinks an' poker, eh?" to which Burgin replied, "You know what you are, Shelton? You're just one big snafu lookin' for a place to happen"

He met replacement Eugene Sledge on Pavuvu; and the two saw action under the command of Andrew Haldane during the Battle of Peleliu. Sledge's book details his experiences and friendship with Shelton on Peleliu and Okinawa; Shelton gave Sledge the nickname "Sledgehammer". He was discharged from the Marine Corps in 1946 with the rank of corporal.

=== Later life and death ===
He returned to Louisiana after the war and worked as an air conditioner repairman and in the lumber industry. He was married to Gladys Bowman-Shelton until his death and they had two sons, Allen and Floyd; the latter of which died before his father, in 1990. He and Sledge did not speak for over thirty-five years until he read Sledge's book and the two reunited.

Shelton died on May 3, 1993, in Jackson, Louisiana. Sledge was not one of his pallbearers despite popular belief, as later confirmed by Sledge's son Henry. He is buried at the Bowman-Dedon Cemetery, in West Feliciana Parish, Louisiana alongside his wife.

== See also ==
- List of U.S. Marines
- List of people from Louisiana
- Eugene Sledge
- Romus Burgin
