= Jewett, Texas =

- City
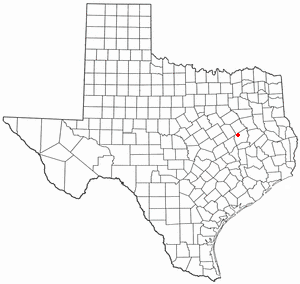
- Location of Jewett, Texas

- Coordinates: 31°21′43″N 96°08′37″W
- Country: United States
- State: Texas
- County: Leon

Area
  - Total: 2.06 sq mi (5.33 km^{2})
  - Land: 2.05 sq mi (5.31 km^{2})
  - Water: 0.0077 sq mi (0.02 km^{2})
- Elevation: 495 ft (151 m)

Population (2020)
  - Total: 793
  - Density: 387/sq mi (149/km^{2})
- Time zone: UTC-6 (Central (CST))
  - Summer (DST): UTC-5 (CDT)
- ZIP code: 75846
- Area codes: 903, 430
- FIPS code: 48-37648
- GNIS feature ID: 2410142
- Website: cityofjewett.com

Jewett is a city in Leon County, Texas, United States. Its population was 793 at the 2020 census. It was laid out in 1871 by the International Railroad Company.

== Geography ==
According to the United States Census Bureau, the city has a total area of 2.1 square miles (5.4 km^{2}), of which 0.04 sq mi (0.10 km^{2}) (0.97%) is covered by water.

== Demographics ==
Historical population
Census	Pop.	Note	%±
1880	227		—
1890	363		59.9%
1910	586		—
1920	460		−21.5%
1930	516		12.2%
1940	515		−0.2%
1950	598		16.1%
1960	445		−25.6%
1970	447		0.4%
1980	597		33.6%
1990	668		11.9%
2000	861		28.9%
2010	1,167		35.5%
2020	793		−32.0%
U.S. Decennial Census; 2020 Census

=== 2020 census ===
As of the 2020 census, Jewett had a population of 793. The median age was 35.8 years. 27.9% of residents were under the age of 18 and 14.1% of residents were 65 years of age or older. For every 100 females there were 92.0 males, and for every 100 females age 18 and over there were 93.9 males age 18 and over.

0.0% of residents lived in urban areas, while 100.0% lived in rural areas.

There were 298 households in Jewett, of which 36.9% had children under the age of 18 living in them. Of all households, 52.7% were married-couple households, 15.4% were households with a male householder and no spouse or partner present, and 27.2% were households with a female householder and no spouse or partner present. About 25.2% of all households were made up of individuals and 11.7% had someone living alone who was 65 years of age or older.

There were 450 housing units, of which 33.8% were vacant. The homeowner vacancy rate was 2.0% and the rental vacancy rate was 33.5%.

Racial composition as of the 2020 census
Race	Number	Percent
White	551	69.5%
Black or African American	43	5.4%
American Indian and Alaska Native	4	0.5%
Asian	13	1.6%
Native Hawaiian and Other Pacific Islander	0	0.0%
Some other race	125	15.8%
Two or more races	57	7.2%
Hispanic or Latino (of any race)	328	41.4%

=== 2000 census ===
At the 2000 census, 861 people, 333 households, and 223 families lived in the city. The population density was 418.4 inhabitants per square mile (161.5/km^{2}). The 399 housing units had an average density of 193.9 per square mile (74.9/km^{2}). The racial makeup of the city was 75.15% White, 7.67% African American, 14.87% from other races, and 2.32% from two or more races. Hispanics or Latinos of any race were 23.58%.

Of the 333 households, 38.1% had children under 18 living with them, 47.1% were married couples living together, 14.4% had a female householder with no husband present, and 33.0% were not families. About 30.0% of households were one person and 14.4% were one person 65 or older. The average household size was 2.59 and the average family size was 3.22.

The age distribution was 31.6% under 18, 10.1% from 18 to 24, 27.4% from 25 to 44, 18.7% from 45 to 64, and 12.2% 65 or older. The median age was 31 years. For every 100 females, there were 94.8 males. For every 100 females 18 and over, there were 87.6 males.

The median income for a household was $26,250 and for a family was $33,500. Males had a median income of $31,667 versus $20,347 for females. The per capita income for the city was $17,469. About 21.4% of families and 26.4% of the population were below the poverty line, including 29.7% of those under 18 and 21.0% of those 65 or over.

== Education ==
Jewett is served by the Leon Independent School District.

== Climate ==
The climate in this area is characterized by hot, humid summers and generally mild to cool winters. According to the Köppen climate classification, Jewett has a humid subtropical climate, Cfa on climate maps.

== Notable people ==
- Alger "Texas" Alexander, blues singer, was born in Jewett.
- Romus Burgin, a U.S. Marine and author, was born in Jewett.
- Fritz Von Erich, a professional wrestler, was born in Jewett.

== Gallery ==
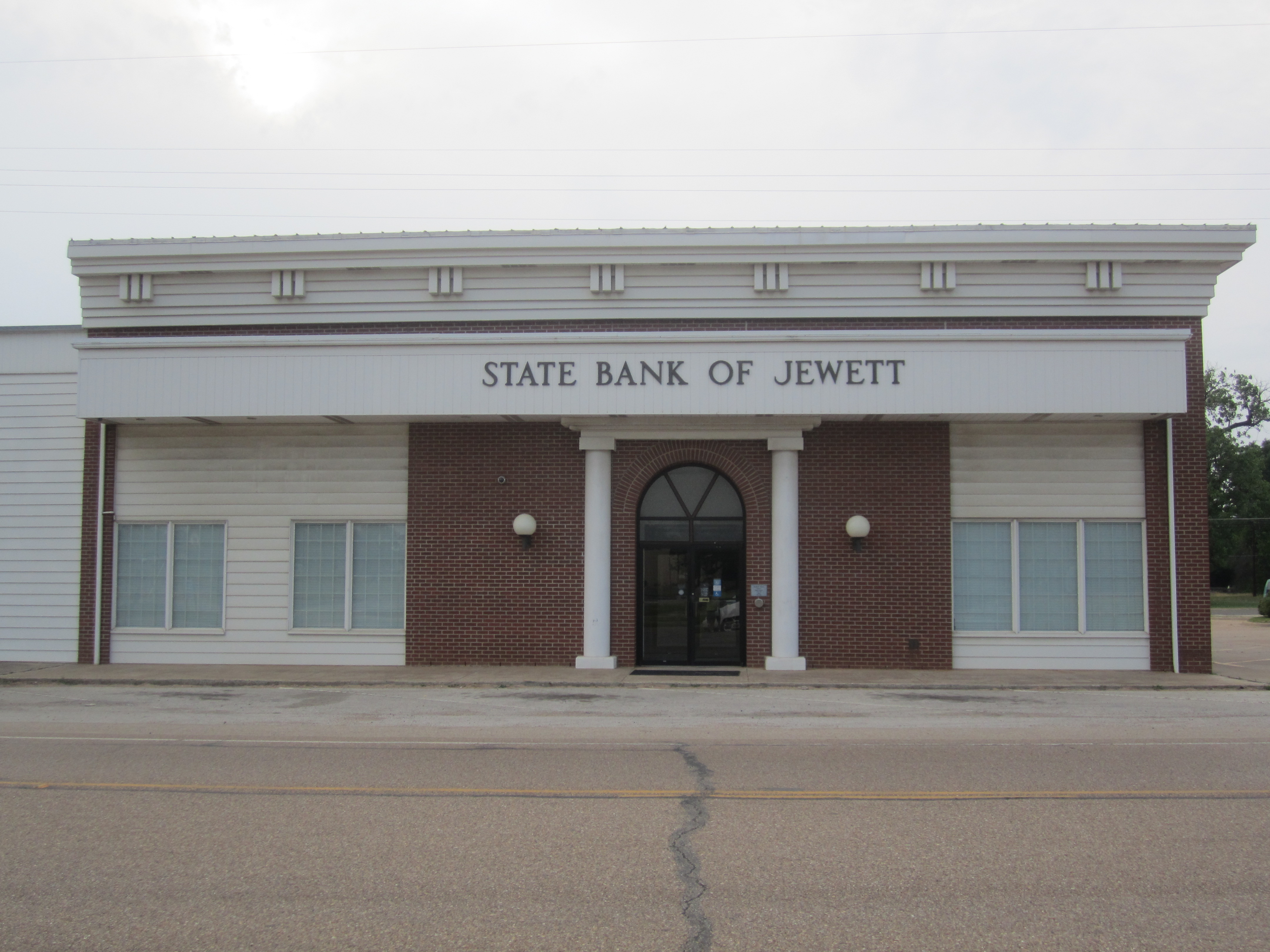
The State Bank of Jewett is located on U.S. Route 79.

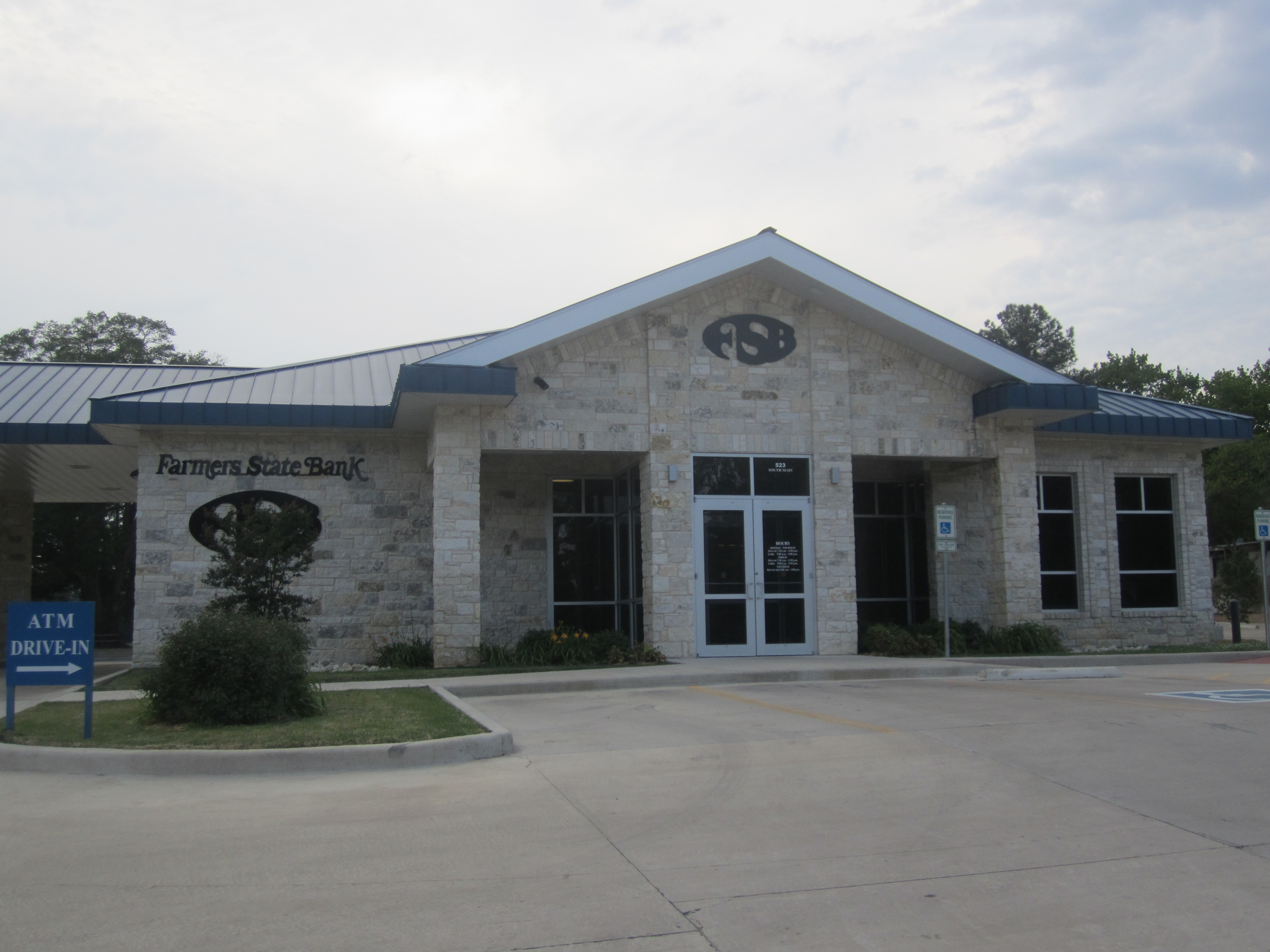
Farmers State Bank in Jewett

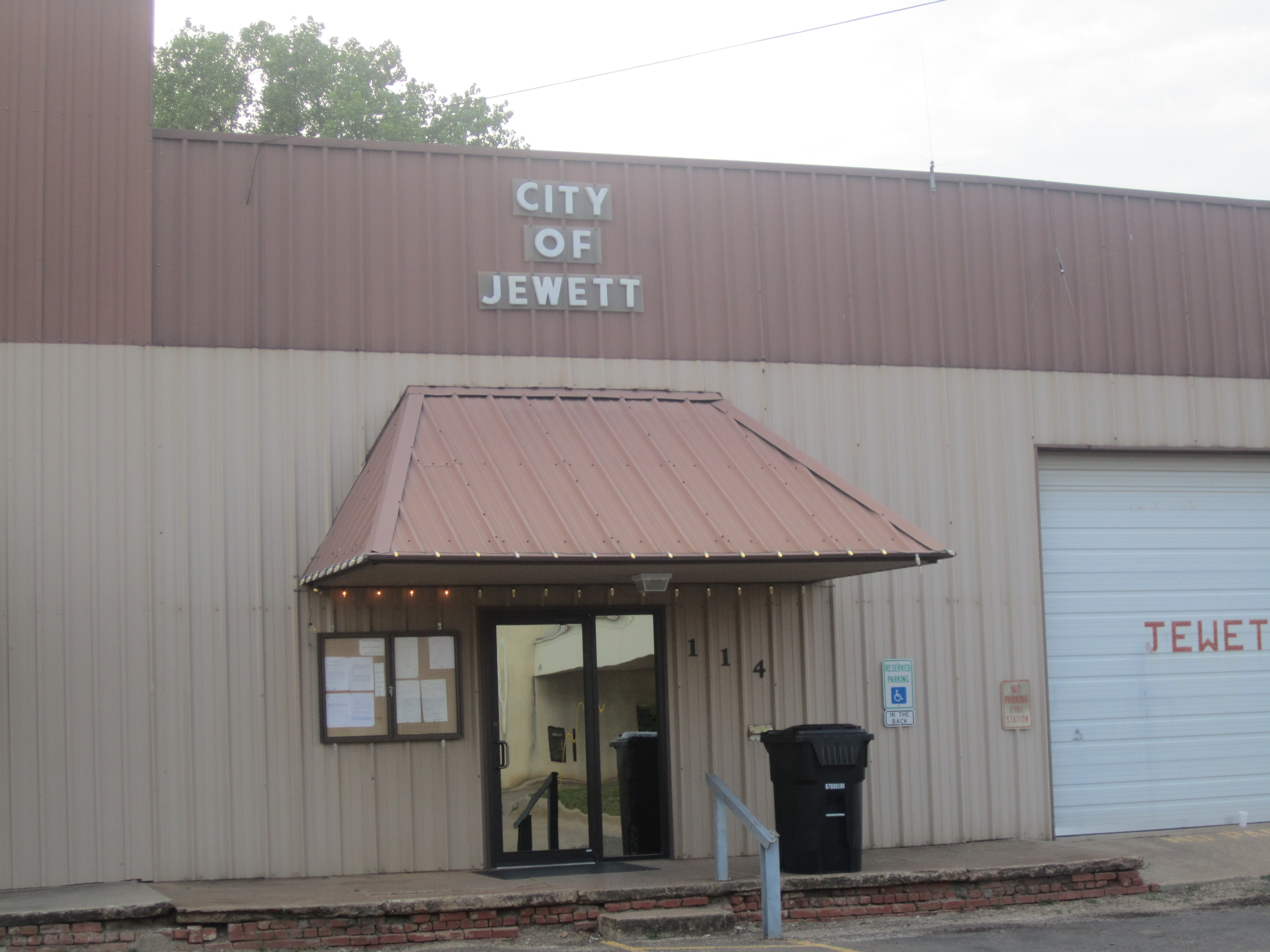
Jewett City Hall

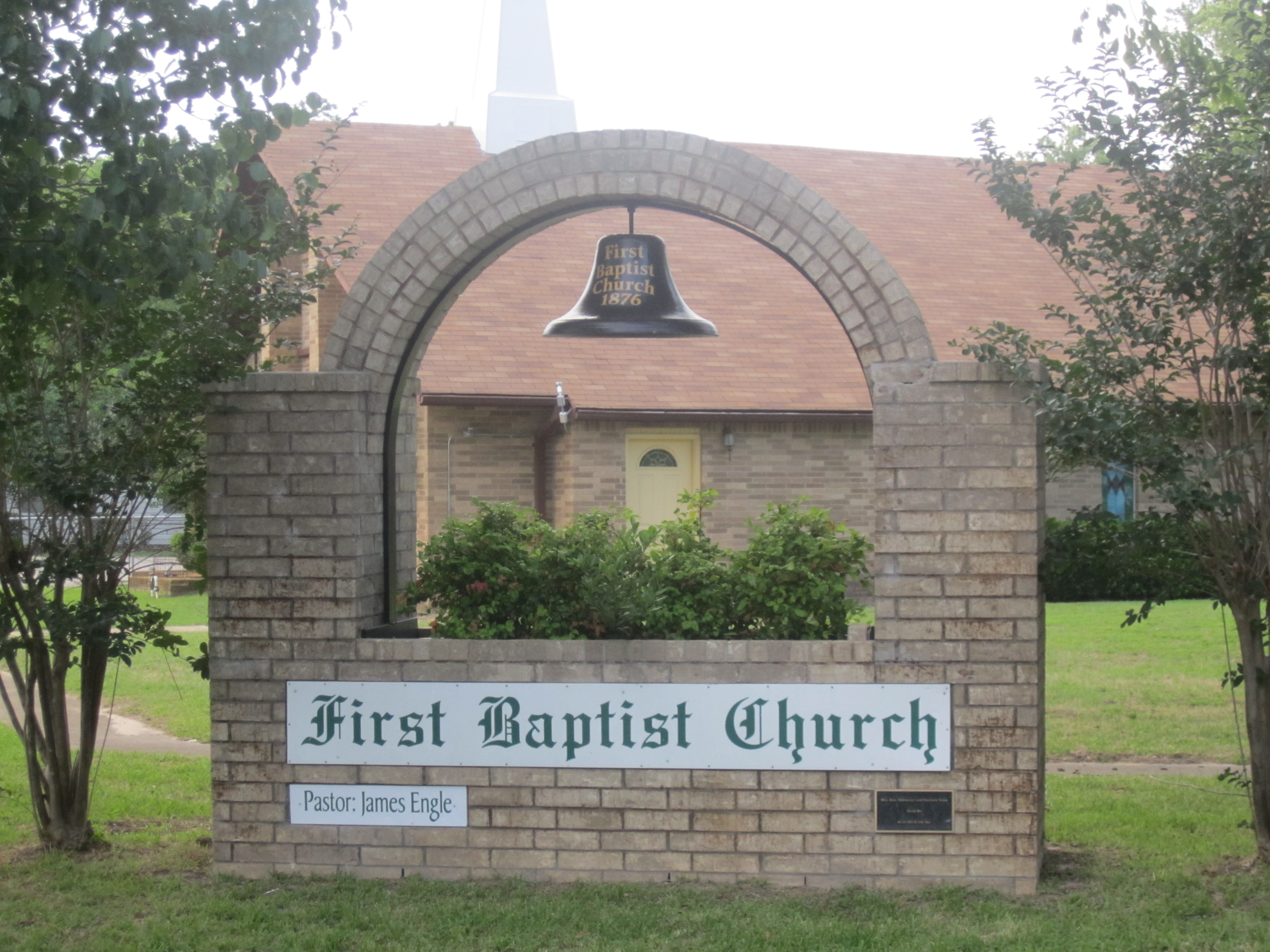
The First Baptist Church in Jewett dates to 1876.

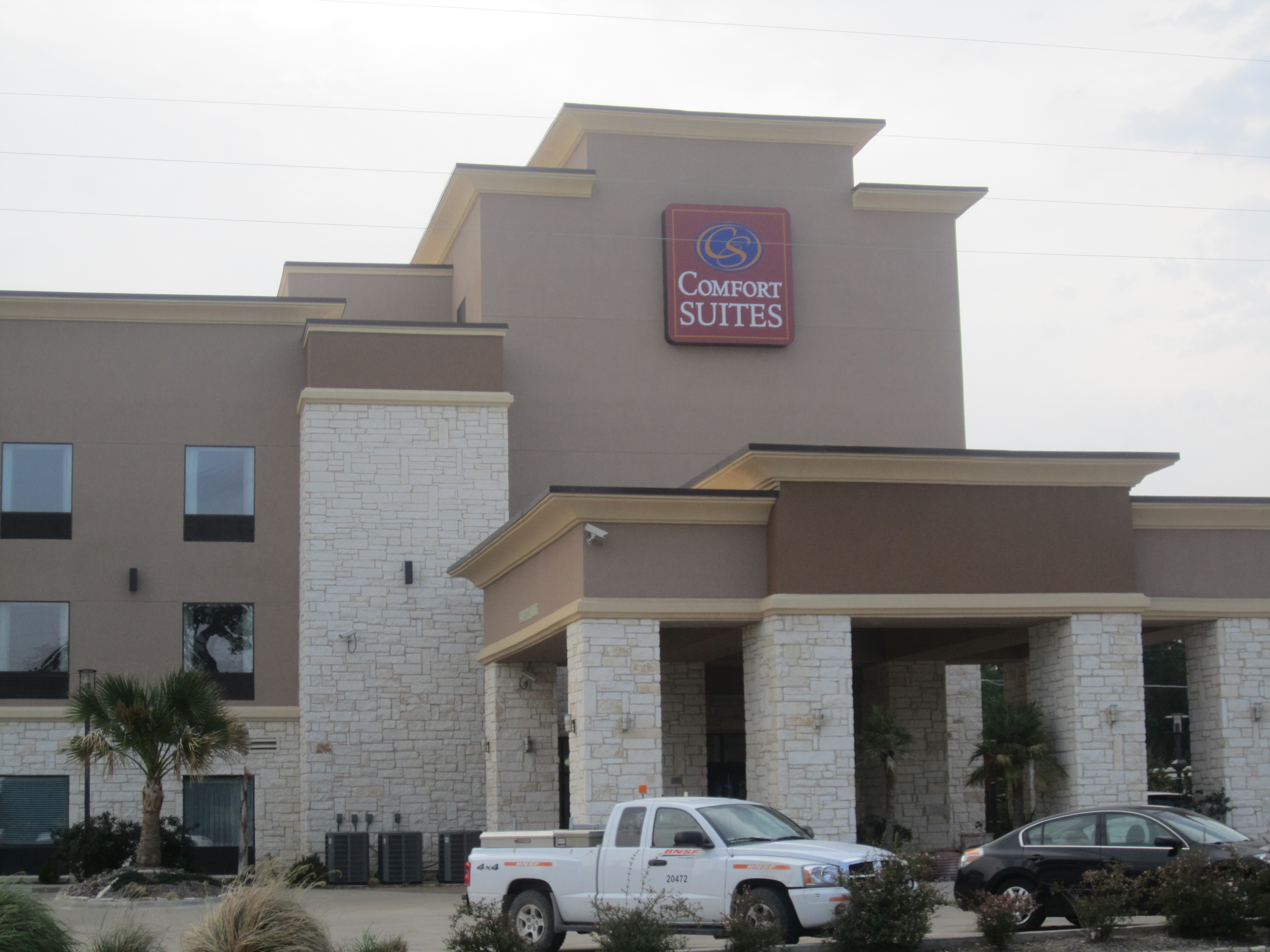
Comfort Suites, Jewett
