= Andrew Haldane =

U.S. Marine Corps captain (1917–1944)

- Born: Andrew Allison Haldane; August 22, 1917; Lawrence, Massachusetts, U.S.
- Died: October 12, 1944 (aged 27); Peleliu, Palau
- Burial place: Arlington National Cemetery
- Education: Bowdoin College
- Military career
- Allegiance: United States
- Branch: United States Marine Corps
- Service years: 1942–1944
- Rank: Captain
- Nickname: Ack-Ack
- Commands: K Company, 3rd Battalion, 5th Marine Regiment, 1st Marine Division
- Conflicts: World War II; Guadalcanal Campaign; Battle of Cape Gloucester; Battle of Peleliu †
- Awards: Silver Star (2)

Andrew Allison Haldane (August 22, 1917 – October 12, 1944), nicknamed Ack-Ack, was a United States Marine Corps officer who served in the Pacific theatre during World War II. He was killed in action during the Battle of Peleliu.

== Early life ==
Haldane was born in Lawrence, Massachusetts, and lived in Methuen, Massachusetts, most of his life. He was of Scottish descent and graduated from the Searles High School in 1935, and attended St John's Prep in Danvers, then Bridgton Academy in Bridgton, Maine.

Haldane then attended Bowdoin College in Brunswick, Maine. He was captain of the football team, served as president of the student council, and was voted most popular senior in 1940. He also played amateur baseball as a catcher in a summer league operating in New Hampshire and Vermont. Haldane graduated from Bowdoin in June 1941, and was named an assistant football coach there in October. He had planned to coach for a season before joining the Marine Corps, but was called up after coaching for a mere two weeks.

== World War II ==
Haldane graduated from the Reserve Officers’ Training School in Quantico and was commissioned as a second lieutenant in the Marine Corps on January 31, 1942. He served with the 1st Marine Division on Guadalcanal, and was commanding officer of Company K at Cape Gloucester, where he received the Silver Star for leading hand-to-hand combat in a fight on Walt's Ridge.

Haldane led Company K through most of the fight for Peleliu. He was killed by a sniper of the Imperial Japanese Army on October 12, 1944, while assessing the area of Hill 140 during the Battle of Peleliu in the Palau Islands, three days before the Marines came off the lines.

== Legacy ==
In May 1948, a Sea Scouts unit ("ship") sponsored by Bowdoin College was named in Haldane's honor. He is honored annually by presentation of the Haldane Cup to the graduating senior at Bowdoin College who has displayed outstanding qualities of leadership and character. The Haldane Cup was established through a 1945 donation of $275 ($4,918 in 2025) sent to the college from Marine colleagues of Haldane who had also attended Bowdoin.

=== In memoirs ===
==== With the Old Breed ====
Eugene Sledge, a mortar-man in Company K, describes what happened to his company's commander in his book, With the Old Breed: At Peleliu and Okinawa:

At the time of Captain Haldane's death, the bulk of Company K was operating with its parent battalion (3/5) on Hill 140 within the Umurbrogol Pocket. In an attempt to orient himself to the strange terrain his company was occupying, Haldane was peeking over a ridge and was shot by a Japanese sniper and was killed instantly. First Lieutenant Thomas J. Stanley succeeded him as commander of K/3/5. Stanley led Company K through the remainder of the Peleliu campaign and on to Okinawa the following spring.

In his book, Sledge pays his leader a tribute:

Capt. Andy Haldane wasn't an idol. He was human. But he commanded our individual destinies under the most trying conditions with the utmost compassion. We knew he could never be replaced. He was the finest Marine officer I ever knew. The loss of many close friends grieved me deeply on Peleliu and Okinawa. But to all of us the loss of our company commander at Peleliu was like losing a parent we depended upon for security – not our physical security, because we knew that was a commodity beyond our reach in combat, but our mental security.... So ended the outstanding combat career of a fine officer who had distinguished himself at Guadalcanal, Cape Gloucester, and Peleliu. We had lost our leader and our friend. Our lives would never be the same. But we turned back to the ugly business at hand.

Haldane was portrayed by actor Scott Gibson in the 2010 HBO miniseries The Pacific, which is partially based on With the Old Breed.

==== Islands of the Damned ====
Romus "R.V." Burgin, the senior mortar-man of Sledge's mortar squad in Company K, also speaks highly of Captain Haldane in his own memoir, Islands of the Damned: A Marine at War in the Pacific:

(Captain Haldane) was as well liked as any officer I knew. I never heard him raise his voice at any man. He was firm, but he was a gentleman, and compassionate.

Unlike Sledge, Burgin was present for Haldane's death and described it in this book. When Third Battalion arrived to relieve the Second Battalion on Hill 140,

Everybody was warning them not to show their heads over the top. Jap snipers on the far side were alert, and deadly. But someone needed to see what was beyond the hill in order to direct the battalion's fire.... Second Battalion's own machine gunners were dug in so low, they could hardly see what they were shooting at. They had to sight their guns by looking under the barrels. This was not satisfactory to Captain Haldane, who was himself an old machine gunner. He slithered forward a few feet and cautiously raised his head. Everybody heard a sharp thwack and knew instantly what it meant. Those who were close enough said his head just exploded. There was no point in even calling for a corpsman.

== Awards ==
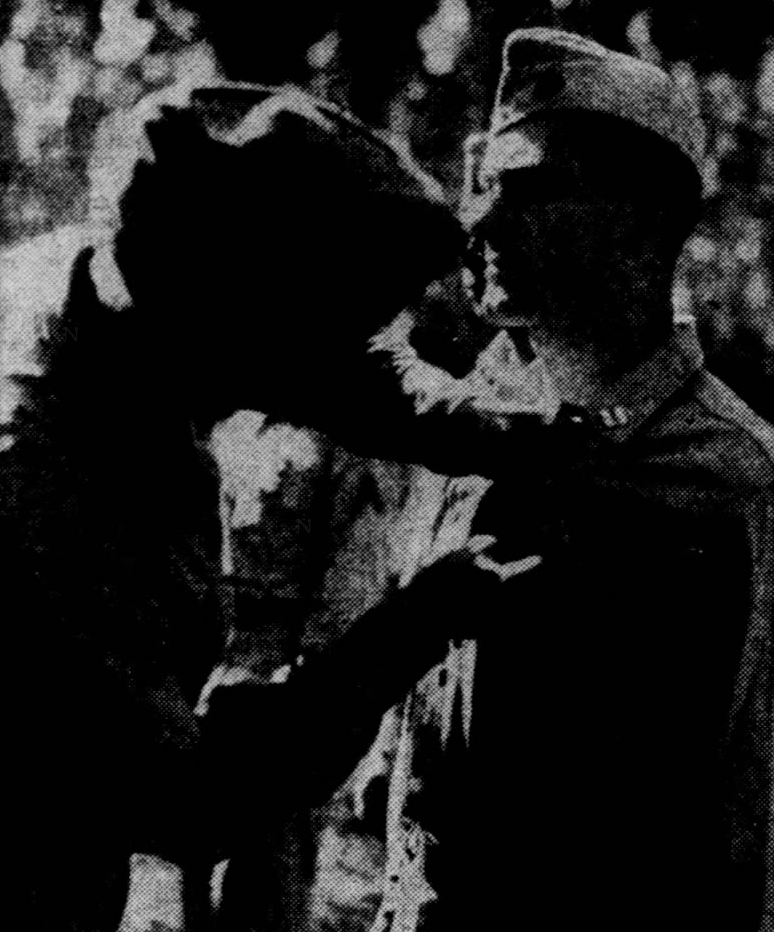
Haldane being awarded the Silver Star by Brig. Gen. Oliver P. Smith, mid-1944

Haldane was awarded the Silver Star twice, first for action in January 1944, and again for action in October 1944.

=== First Silver Star citation ===
Citation:

The President of the United States of America takes pleasure in presenting the Silver Star to Captain Andrew A. Haldane (MCSN: 0-8740), United States Marine Corps Reserve, for conspicuous gallantry and intrepidity as Commanding Officer of Company K, Third Battalion, Fifth Marines, FIRST Marine Division in action against enemy Japanese forces at Cape Gloucester, New Britain, January 9–10, 1944. With utter disregard for his own personal safety Captain Haldane fearlessly directed the attack of his company against strongly emplaced enemy positions on Aogiri Ridge in the face of intense Machine gun, mortar and sniper fire. Later, in the pitch darkness of early morning he valiantly led his command in a determined stand against five vicious counter attacks by a superior number of fanatical Japanese troops, thereby contributing in a large measure to securing the beachhead line of the airdrome. Captain Haldane's brilliant leadership and indomitable fighting spirit were in keeping with the highest traditions of the United States Naval Service.

=== Second Silver Star citation ===
Citation:

The President of the United States of America takes pride in presenting a Gold Star in lieu of a Second Award of the Silver Star (Posthumously) to Captain Andrew A. Haldane (MCSN: 0-8740), United States Marine Corps Reserve, for conspicuous gallantry and intrepidity as Commanding Officer of Company K, Third Battalion, Fifth Marines, FIRST Marine Division in action against enemy Japanese forces on Peleliu and Ngesebus Islands, Palau Group from 15 September to 12 October 1944. A splendid and fearless leader, Captain Haldane repeatedly led his assault company through intense hostile artillery and small arms fire to rout the enemy from strongly held positions with heavy losses. On 12 October, he personally directed a platoon of his men against a firmly defended cave on an important ridge continuing his heroic efforts until mortally wounded by Japanese sniper fire. By his inspiring courage and disregard for personal safety, Captain Haldane contributed materially to the success of our forces in these strategic areas and his valiant conduct throughout was in keeping with the highest traditions of the United States Naval Service. He gallantly gave his life for his country.
