= Romus Burgin =

United States Marine and author (1922–2019)

Romus Valton Burgin
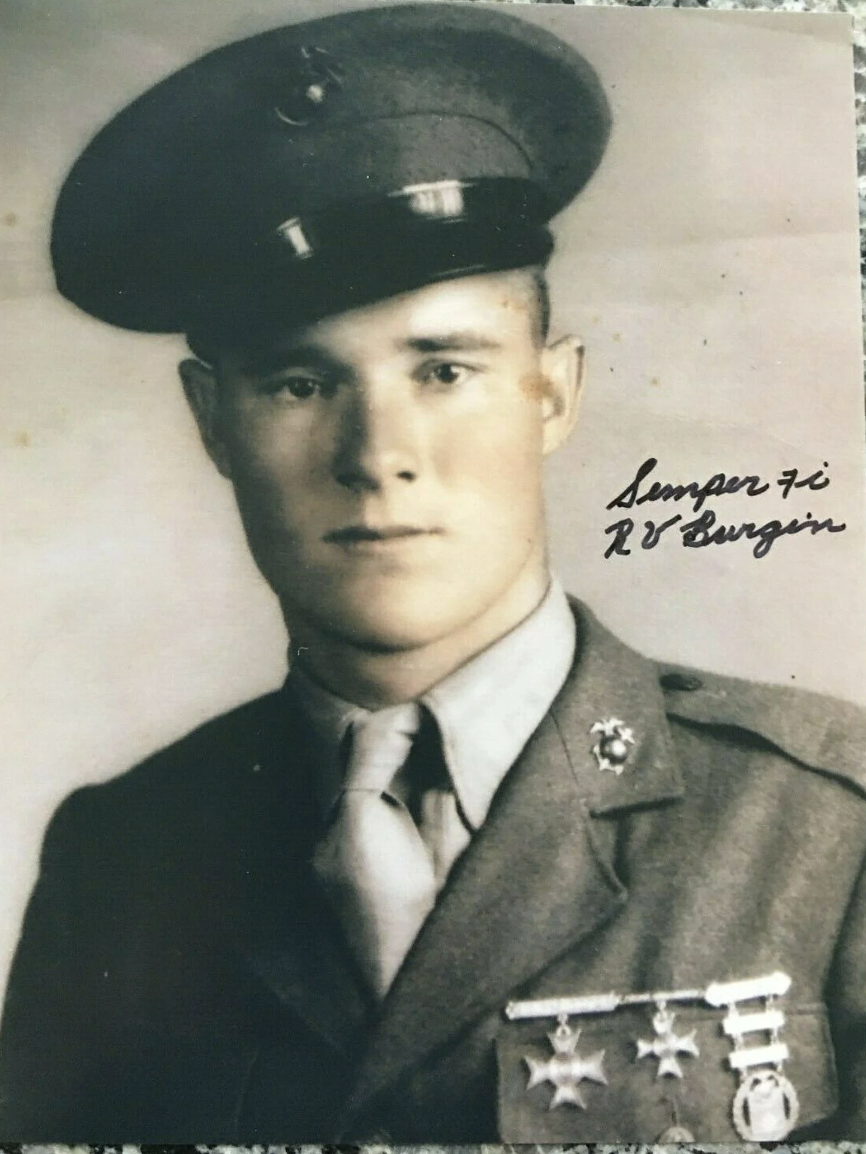
- Born: August 13, 1922; Jewett, Texas, U.S.
- Died: April 6, 2019 (aged 96); Lancaster, Texas, U.S.
- Burial place: Rawlins Cemetery, Lancaster, Texas
- Spouse: Florence Riseley (m. 1947)
- Children: 4
- Military career
- Allegiance: United States
- Branch: United States Marine Corps
- Service years: 1942–1945
- Rank: Sergeant
- Nickname: Burgie
- Units: K Company, 3rd Battalion, 5th Marines, 1st Marine Division
- Conflicts: World War II; Battle of Cape Gloucester; Battle of Peleliu; Battle of Okinawa
- Awards: Bronze Star Medal; Purple Heart

Romus Valton "R. V." Burgin (August 13, 1922 – April 6, 2019) was a United States Marine and American author. As a young man, he served in the Pacific Theater during World War II.

Burgin was the author of the memoir Islands of the Damned: A Marine at War in the Pacific (with William Marvel). Burgin is portrayed in the HBO miniseries The Pacific by Martin McCann. Burgin himself appears in documentary footage during the miniseries.

== Early life and family ==
Burgin was born to Joseph Harmon Burgin and Beulah May (née Perry) Burgin in Jewett, Texas. He attended and graduated from Jewett High School in 1940 where he had been Captain of the football team.

Burgin's younger brother, Joseph ("Joe" or "J.D.") Delton (March 24, 1926 – February 17, 1945) joined the United States Army, after changing his year of birth from 1926 to 1925, and was sent to Europe, as a member of Company "C", 274th Infantry Regiment, 70th Infantry Division. Joseph died in Alsace-Lorraine on February 17, 1945, when he was killed by artillery fire near the river Saar and the town of Forbach, as they moved east toward Saarbrücken on the other side of the river, as part of a push against the Siegfried Line. He is buried at the Sardis Cemetery next to his parents.

== Military career ==
Burgin joined the United States Marine Corps on November 13, 1942, during World War II and was assigned to the 9th Replacement Battalion. He soon became a mortarman in K-Company, 3rd Battalion, 5th Marines, 1st Marine Division (K/3/5), and fought in the Pacific War at Cape Gloucester, then alongside his friends Eugene Sledge and Merriell "Snafu" Shelton, on Peleliu, and Okinawa. Burgin was promoted to the rank of sergeant upon reaching Okinawa.

He was awarded a Bronze Star for his actions in the Battle of Okinawa on 2 May 1945, when he destroyed a Japanese machine gun emplacement that had his company pinned down. He also was to be recommended for a Silver Star by Captain Andrew "Ack-Ack" Haldane for destroying a pillbox on Peleliu, but Haldane was killed by sniper fire before he could submit the recommendation.

== Personal life ==
In 1946, Burgin began working for the United States Post Office. He was employed there until his retirement in 1977. While on leave in Melbourne during World War II, Burgin met an Australian woman, Florence Riseley. They married in Dallas on January 29, 1947. The couple had four daughters.

Burgin did not speak about the war, not even to his family, until he met other veterans and decided to author his book. Burgin then became a fixture at veterans events and was one of seven grand marshals in the 2015 Dallas Veterans Day Parade.

Burgin died on April 6, 2019, at the age of 96 in Lancaster, Texas, and is buried next to his wife at Rawlins Cemetery.

== Bibliography ==
- Burgin, R. V.; Marvel, William "Bill" (2010). Islands of the Damned: A Marine at War in the Pacific. Penguin. ISBN 978-0-451-22990-8.

== See also ==
- List of U.S. Marines
- List of non-fiction writers
- List of writers
- List of people from Texas
- Eugene Sledge
- Merriell Shelton
