= With the Old Breed =

Book by Eugene Sledge

With the Old Breed: At Peleliu and Okinawa
- Oxford University Cover
- Author: Eugene B. Sledge
- Language: English
- Genre: War Memoir
- Publisher: Presidio Press
- Publication date: 1981
- Publication place: United States
- Media type: Print
- Pages: 326 p.
- ISBN: 0-19-506714-2
- OCLC: 22653690
- Dewey Decimal: 940.54/26 20
- LC Class: D767.99.P4 S55 1991
- Followed by: China Marine: An Infantryman's Life after World War II

With the Old Breed: At Peleliu and Okinawa is a World War II memoir by United States Marine, Eugene Sledge, first published in 1981. The memoir is based on notes Sledge kept tucked away in a pocket-sized Bible he carried with him during battles he fought at Peleliu and Okinawa. The book formed part of the basis of the material covered by Ken Burns' PBS documentary The War (2007), as well as the HBO miniseries The Pacific (2010), in which Sledge was portrayed by Joseph Mazzello. Author and oral historian Studs Terkel, interviewed the author for his definitive oral history, The Good War (1984).

== Origins ==
By his own account, Sledge began writing the memoir in 1944, "immediately after Peleliu while we were in rest camp on Pavuvu Island" and continued working on it "as soon as I returned to civilian life" in 1946. Nicknamed "Sledgehammer" by his comrades, Sledge experienced combat during the battles of Peleliu and Okinawa as a 60 mm mortarman while part of K Company, 3rd Battalion, 5th Marines, 1st Marine Division (K/3/5).

The book's working title was A Marine Mortarman in World War II, which Sledge later changed to Into The Abyss. The book was first published under its final title by the Presidio Press in 1981.

=== Synopsis ===
Sledge's memoir is a front-line account of infantry combat in the Pacific War. It contains a US Marine's firsthand account of island hopping, climate, disease, the fear and uncertainty that characterized the campaign in the Pacific. Sledge wrote starkly of the brutality displayed by Japanese soldiers during the battles and of the hatred that both sides harbored for each other.

In one instance, Sledge describes an account where he and a comrade came across the dead bodies of three Marines, mutilated with their severed genitals inserted into their mouths. He also describes the behavior of some Marines towards dead Japanese, including the removal of gold teeth from Japanese corpses and, in one case, from a Japanese soldier who was still alive, as well as other macabre trophy-taking. He details the process and mechanisms that slowly strip away a combat infantryman's humanity and compassion, in a manner that is accessible to a general audience.

Sledge describes in detail the physical struggle of living in a combat zone and the debilitating effects of constant fear, fatigue, and filth. He wrote that "Fear and filth went hand-in-hand, it has always puzzled me that this important factor in our daily lives has received so little attention from historians and is often omitted from otherwise excellent personal memoirs by infantrymen."

== Reception ==
Describing it as an example of "The American procedure at its best, unashamed of simplicity," literary historian Paul Fussell wrote that With the Old Breed was "One of the finest memoirs to emerge from any war."

New York Times writer and editor Dwight Garner described the book's depiction of war as "surpassingly vivid," adding, "What puts With the Old Breed across is, oddly enough, Sledge's sensitivity. He offers many small, artful portraits of men he admires (and a few he despises.) He chronicles small kindnesses and profound acts of friendship."

== Printings ==
- 1981: Novato, California: Presidio Press. — 12197607
- 1983: Paperback: Toronto; New York: Bantam Books. — ISBN 978-0-553-23055-0 — 82912620

(The Bantam war book series)

- 1990: New York, New York: Oxford University Press. — ISBN 978-0-19-506714-9 — 22653690

(New introduction by Paul Fussell)

- 1990: Novato, California: Presidio. — ISBN 978-0-89141-119-2 — 21718513
- 1996: Annapolis, Maryland: Naval Institute Press. — ISBN 978-1-55750-747-1 — 35132407

(Classics of Naval Literature series; introduction by Joseph H. Alexander)

- 2001: Prince Frederick, Maryland: Recorded Books. — ISBN 978-0-7887-4879-0 — 48064872

(Audio-10 cassettes)

- 2006: Princeton, New Jersey: Recording for the Blind & Dyslexic. — 70684214

(Audio-CD)

- 2007: New York, New York: Presidio Press:

(New introduction by Victor Davis Hanson)

Trade paperback — (8.2" x 5.5"): ISBN 978-0-89141-906-8 — 124046079
Mass market paperback — (6.8" x 4.2"): ISBN 978-0-89141-919-8 — 175295688

- 2010: London, England: Ebury Press

Trade paperback ISBN 978-0-09-193753-9 - 0091937531

=== Translation into Japanese ===
- 2008: ペリリュー・沖縄戦記 (Periryū Okinawa Senki) (The battles for Peleliu and Okinawa), 講談社学術文庫 (Kōdansha Gakujutsubunko) (Kōdansha pocket-sized academic book series), ISBN 978-4-06-159885-0

=== Translation into Thai ===
- 2010 แปซิฟิก สมรภูมิเดนตาย สหายร่วมรบ by Matichon press

ISBN 978-974-02-0614-9

=== Translation into Czech ===
- Se starou gardou: na Peleliu an Okinawě, Universum [translation Michal Ulvr]

ISBN 978-80-242-2922-5

=== Translation into German ===
- 2013 Vom alten Schlag: Der Zweite Weltkrieg am anderen Ende der Welt. Erinnerungen, riva Verlag

ISBN 978-3-86883-332-4

=== Translation into French ===
- 2019 Frères d'armes, Les Belles Lettres [translation Pascale Haas]

ISBN 978-2-251-44889-3

=== Translation into Korean ===
- 2019 태평양 전쟁: 펠렐리우·오키나와 전투 참전기 1944-1945, 열린책들

ISBN 978-8-93291-990-4

== Adaptations ==
- 2007: Ken Burns drew considerably from With the Old Breed for his World War II documentary The War.
- 2010: HBO used With the Old Breed, along with Robert Leckie's Helmet for My Pillow, as the basis for the miniseries The Pacific, the successor to Band of Brothers, during which Sledge (played by Joseph Mazzello) is seen occasionally writing notes in his pocket bible.
