= Eugene Sledge =

United States Marine

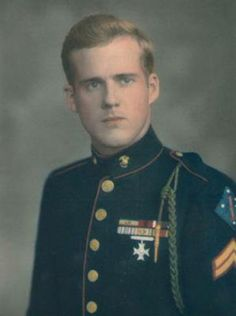
- Sledge in 1946
- Born: Eugene Bondurant Sledge; November 4, 1923; Mobile, Alabama, U.S.
- Died: March 3, 2001 (aged 77); Montevallo, Alabama, U.S.
- Burial place: Pine Crest Cemetery; Mobile, Alabama, U.S.
- Education: Auburn University (BS); University of Florida (PhD)
- Occupations: Author; professor
- Notable work: With the Old Breed
- Spouse: Jeanne Arceneaux (m. 1952)
- Children: 2
- Military service
- Allegiance: United States of America
- Branch: United States Marine Corps
- Service years: 1942–1946
- Rank: Corporal
- Unit: K Company, 3rd Battalion, 5th Marine Regiment, 1st Marine Division
- Conflicts: World War II; Battle of Peleliu; Battle of Okinawa; Chinese Civil War; Operation Beleaguer

Eugene Bondurant Sledge (November 4, 1923 – March 3, 2001) was an American author and academic. A World War II veteran of the United States Marine Corps, his 1981 memoir With the Old Breed: At Peleliu and Okinawa chronicled his combat experiences and was used as source material for the Ken Burns PBS documentary The War (2007), as well as the HBO miniseries The Pacific (2010), in which he is portrayed by Joseph Mazzello.

== Biography ==
=== Early life ===
Eugene Bondurant Sledge was born on November 4, 1923, in Mobile, Alabama, to Edward Simmons Sledge, a physician, and Mary Frank Sturdivant Sledge, dean of women students at Huntingdon College. In 1935 his family moved to Georgia Cottage in Mobile. He graduated from Murphy High School in Mobile in the spring of 1942.

His older brother, Edward Simmons Sledge II, was born on September 10, 1920, and was commissioned as an officer in the United States Army after graduating as a cadet from The Citadel. During World War II, he served on the Western Front as part of the 741st Tank Battalion, fighting at Omaha Beach and the Battle of the Bulge. Edward II was awarded three Purple Hearts, two Bronze Stars, and a Silver Star during his service, and left the Army with the rank of Major. He also provided an interview to Cornelius Ryan while Ryan was writing the script for The Longest Day.

Eugene was a sickly child, and lost two years of schooling due to rheumatic fever which left him with a heart murmur. However, once the condition subsided, his family encouraged him to enroll in college rather than join the military, believing that he would become "cannon fodder" as he described it. His close childhood friend Sidney Phillips also wrote to Sledge from Guadalcanal, and urged him not to enlist.

=== Military service ===
In the fall of 1942, Sledge enrolled in the Marion Military Institute, in Marion, Alabama, but then chose to volunteer for the U.S. Marine Corps on December 3, 1942. As a compromise with his parents, who requested he seek out a technical officer's position, Sledge was placed in the V-12 officer training program and was sent to the Georgia Institute of Technology. However, he and half of his detachment intentionally flunked out by their first semester so they would be allowed to enter immediate service as enlistees and not "miss the war". He went through boot camp at Marine Corps Recruit Depot San Diego, completing it in late 1943 as part of the 984th Training Platoon, graduating on December 24 (according to his son Henry Sledge).

Once he was out of school, he was assigned to duty as an enlisted man in K Company, 3rd Battalion, 5th Marines, 1st Marine Division (K/3/5), where he served with Corporal R.V. Burgin and Private First Class Merriell "Snafu" Shelton. He and Phillips briefly reunited with each other when Sledge was transported to Pavuvu two weeks before Phillips returned home via a lottery draw.

Sledge rose to the rank of corporal in the Pacific Theater and saw combat as a 60 mm mortarman at Peleliu and Okinawa. When fighting grew too close for effective use of the mortar, he served in other duties, such as stretcher bearer and as a rifleman.

During his service, Sledge kept notes of what happened in his pocket-sized New Testament. When the war ended, he compiled these notes which would, many years later, become the memoir With the Old Breed. After being posted to Beijing after the war, he was discharged from the Marine Corps in February 1946 with the rank of corporal.

=== Post-war ===
After the war ended, Sledge attended Auburn University (then known as Alabama Polytechnic Institute), where he was a member of the Phi Delta Theta fraternity. He received a Bachelor of Science degree in business administration in the summer of 1949.

Sledge had a hard time readjusting to civilian life:

As I strolled the streets of Mobile, civilian life seemed so strange. People rushed around in a hurry about seemingly insignificant things. Few seemed to realize how blessed they were to be free and untouched by the horrors of war. To them, a veteran was a veteran—all were the same, whether one man had survived the deadliest combat or another had pounded a typewriter while in uniform.

Once an avid hunter, Sledge gave up his hobby; he found that he could not endure the thought of wounding a bird, and said that killing a deer felt like shooting a cow in a pasture. His father found him weeping after a dove hunt in which Sledge had to kill a wounded dove, and in the ensuing conversations he told his father he could no longer tolerate seeing any suffering. A key turning point in his life and career followed when his father advised him that he could substitute bird watching as a hobby. Sledge started to assist the conservation department in its banding study efforts, the origin of his well-known passion for the science of ornithology.

When he enrolled at Auburn University, the clerk at the Registrar's office asked him if the Marine Corps had taught him anything useful. Sledge replied:

Lady, there was a killing war. The Marine Corps taught me how to kill Japs and try to survive. Now, if that don't fit into any academic course, I'm sorry. But some of us had to do the killing—and most of my buddies got killed or wounded.

Sledge married Jeanne Arceneaux (died December 2023) in 1952 and the couple had two sons, John (born 1957) and Henry (a military historian, born 1965). Henry published his book expanding on his father's work, entitled, The Old Breed... The Complete Story Revealed: A Father, A Son, and How WWII in the Pacific Shaped Their Lives in 2025. Eugene Sledge returned to Auburn in 1953, where he worked as a research assistant until 1955. That same year he graduated from API with a Master of Science degree in botany.

=== Doctorate and later work ===
From 1956 to 1960, Sledge attended the University of Florida and worked as a research assistant. He published numerous papers on helminthology and in 1956 joined the Helminthological Society of Washington. He received his doctorate in biology from the University of Florida in 1960. He was employed by the Division of Plant Industry for the Florida State Department of Agriculture from 1959 to 1962.

In the summer of 1962, Sledge was appointed assistant professor of biology at Alabama College (now the University of Montevallo). In 1970, he became a professor, a position he held until his retirement in 1990. He taught zoology, ornithology, comparative vertebrate anatomy, and other courses during his long tenure there. Sledge was popular with his students, and organized field trips and collections around town. In 1989, he received an honorary degree and rank of colonel from Marion Military Institute.

=== Death ===
Sledge died after a long battle with stomach cancer on March 3, 2001. He is buried at Pine Crest Cemetery in Mobile.

== Bibliography ==
=== With the Old Breed ===
At the urging of his wife, Sledge began compiling a memoir of his wartime experiences as a way to help him cope. In 1981, he published With the Old Breed: At Peleliu and Okinawa, a memoir of his World War II service in the United States Marine Corps. With the Old Breed was reprinted in 1990 with an introduction by Paul Fussell and again in 2007 with an introduction by Victor Davis Hanson. In 1992, Sledge appeared in the documentary film Peleliu 1944: Horror in the Pacific. In April 2007, it was announced that With the Old Breed, along with Robert Leckie's Helmet for My Pillow, would form the basis for the HBO series The Pacific.

=== China Marine ===
A second memoir, China Marine: An Infantryman's Life after World War II, was published posthumously. Its initial hardbound edition, with a foreword by Stephen E. Ambrose, was published without a subtitle on May 10, 2002, by the University of Alabama Press. In 2003, Oxford University Press republished it as a paperback edition with the full title, including the subtitle. The book discussed his postwar service in Peking (now known as Beijing), his return to Mobile, and his recovery from the psychological trauma of warfare.

== See also ==
- List of U.S. Marines
- List of non-fiction writers
- List of people from Alabama
- Lists of writers
- Sidney Phillips
- Romus Burgin
- Merriell Shelton
