= US Naval Base Australia =

Major World War 2 bases in Australia

- Australia in the South Pacific in dark green
- Largest city: Sydney Naval Bases; United States Navy; 1941–1945

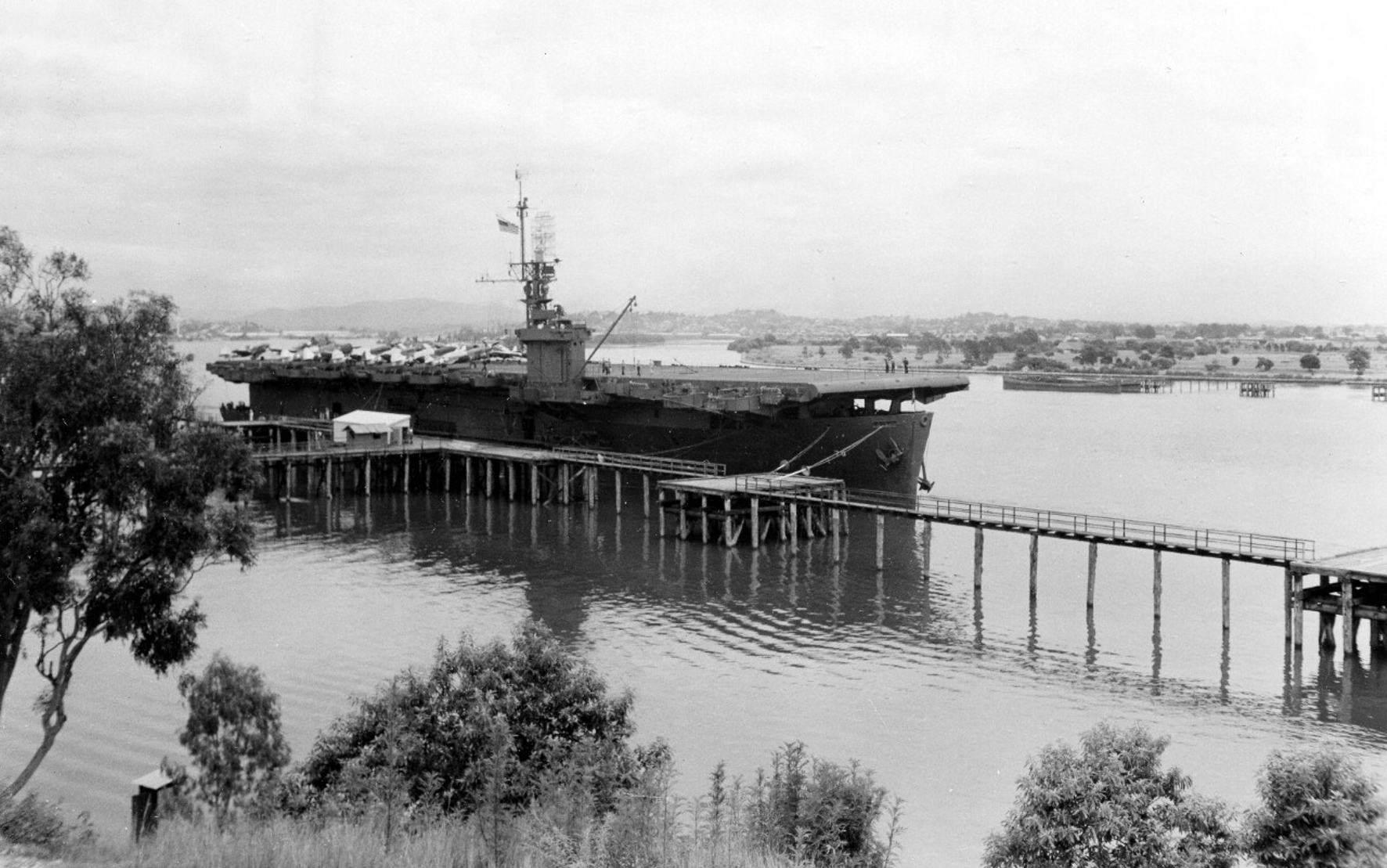
USS Fanshaw Bay (CVE-70) moored at Brisbane, Australia, 10 February 1944

U.S. Naval Base Australia comprised several United States Navy bases in Australia during World War II. Australia entered World War II on 3 September 1939, being a self-governing nation within the British Empire. The United States formally entered the war on 7 December 1941 after the Japanese attack on Pearl Harbor. Following this attack Japanese forces quickly took over much of the western and central Pacific Ocean. The United States lost key naval bases including Naval Base Manila and Naval Base Subic Bay as a result of the 1941 Japanese invasion of the Philippines, along with Guam and Wake Island. The Allied forces needed new bases in the South West Pacific to stage attacks on Japan's southern empire, and these were built in Australia.

== History ==
After the failure of the American-British-Dutch-Australian Command (ABDACOM) to defend the Malay Peninsula, Singapore and the Dutch East Indies, followed by the fall of the Philippines, Allied forces fell back to Australia.

Japanese air attacks in 1942 and 1943 on northern Australia, particularly the bombing of Darwin on 19 February 1942, demonstrated the need for ports further south. In addition, there were fears Japan would attempt to invade Australia. There were Japanese plans to invade Australia, but these were cancelled after the Allied strategic victory at the Battle of the Coral Sea.

The first bases were built by Australian Allied Works Council civilian contractors and rent was paid under the Reverse Lend-Lease. Later construction of US Naval Advance Bases was performed by U.S. Navy Seabees (Naval Construction Battalions).

By the end of the war the U.S. Navy had bases on all four shores of Australia, building facilities for ships, submarines, PT boats, seaplanes, supply depots, training camps, fleet recreation facilities, and ship repair depots. Some of the bases were shared with the Royal Australian Navy and Royal Australian Air Force. Supplies were transported by the United States Merchant Navy. By spring 1943, the build up of the U.S. Navy to support the Pacific War had caused overcrowding at the ports on the eastern coast of Australia. The Seabees departed Naval Base Brisbane on 19 June 1943 to set up a new base in Milne Bay, Papua New Guinea. There were also U.S. naval facilities in New Zealand, but these were closed in 1944 as the fighting moved further north, followed by the closing of most of the bases in Australia after the end of the war in 1945.

== Current ==
The U.S. Navy has only one base currently in Australia:

- Naval Communication Station Harold E. Holt in Exmouth, Western Australia.
- There is one other non-Navy U.S. base in Australia: Pine Gap in Alice Springs, in the center of Northern Territory.

== Major bases ==
Major World War II US Naval bases in Australia:

- Naval Base Brisbane
  - Camp Seabee
  - Naval Air Station Brisbane
  - Hamilton repair depot
  - Naval Air Station Brisbane
- Naval Base Sydney
  - Rose Bay Seaplane Base
- Naval Base Darwin
- Naval Base Melbourne
  - Naval Depot Geelong
  - Naval Intelligence Center Melbourne
- Naval Base Perth
- Fremantle submarine base
- Exmouth Submarine Base

== Minor bases ==
Minor World War II US Naval bases in Australia:

- Auxiliary Albany Submarine Base
- Naval Base Adelaide
- Roebuck Bay Seaplane Base
- Naval Air Station Palm Island
- Thursday Island Submarine Base
- Naval Base Palm Island
- Naval Base Cairns
- Townsville Naval Section Base
- Horn Island Seaplane Base
- Toorbul Combined Training Centre
- Port Stephens amphibious landing training base
- Fleet Radio Unit, Melbourne – intelligence unit
- Fleet Radio Unit Radio Station Cooktown at Cooktown, Queensland. FPO# 813 SF Cooktown

== Gallery ==
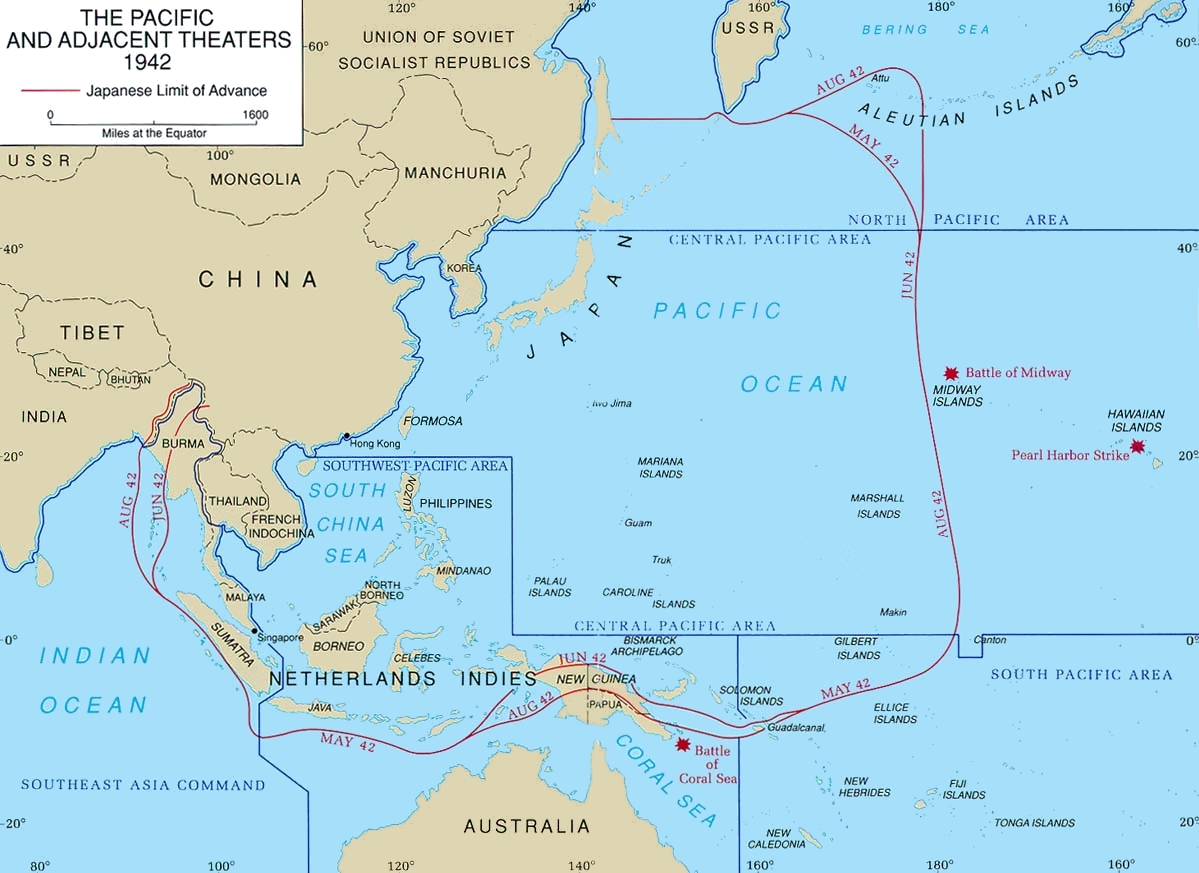
Pacific War Theater Areas map 1942

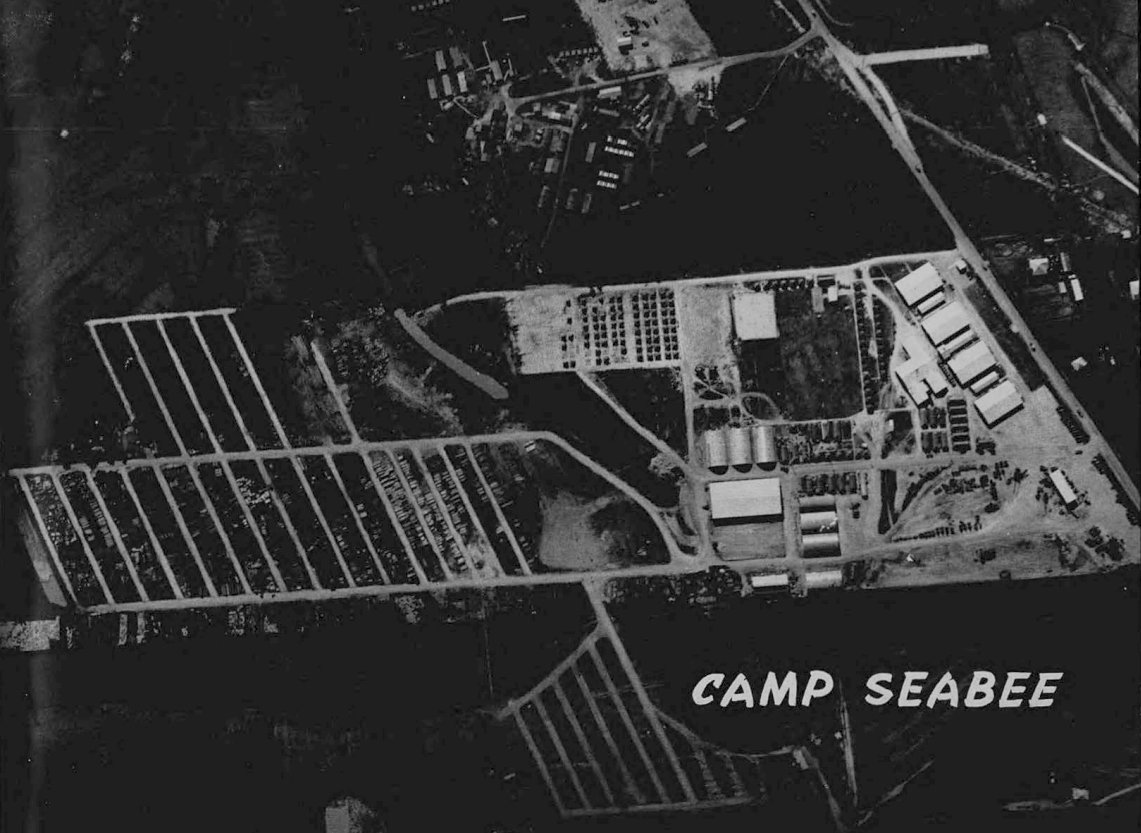
Camp Seabee at Naval Base Brisbane from the air

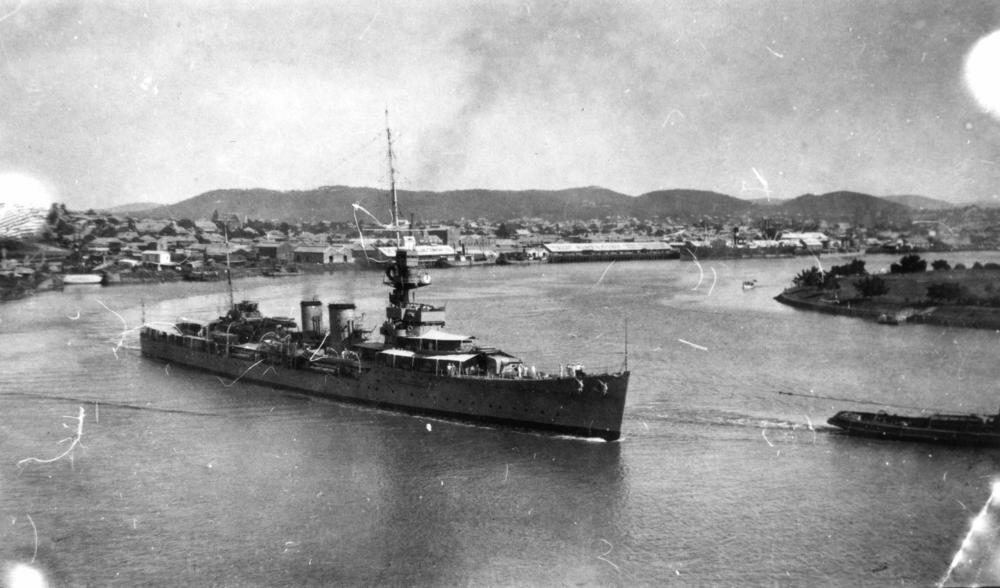
Dunedin at Gardens Reach at Naval Base Brisbane on the Brisbane River. South Brisbane wharves in background

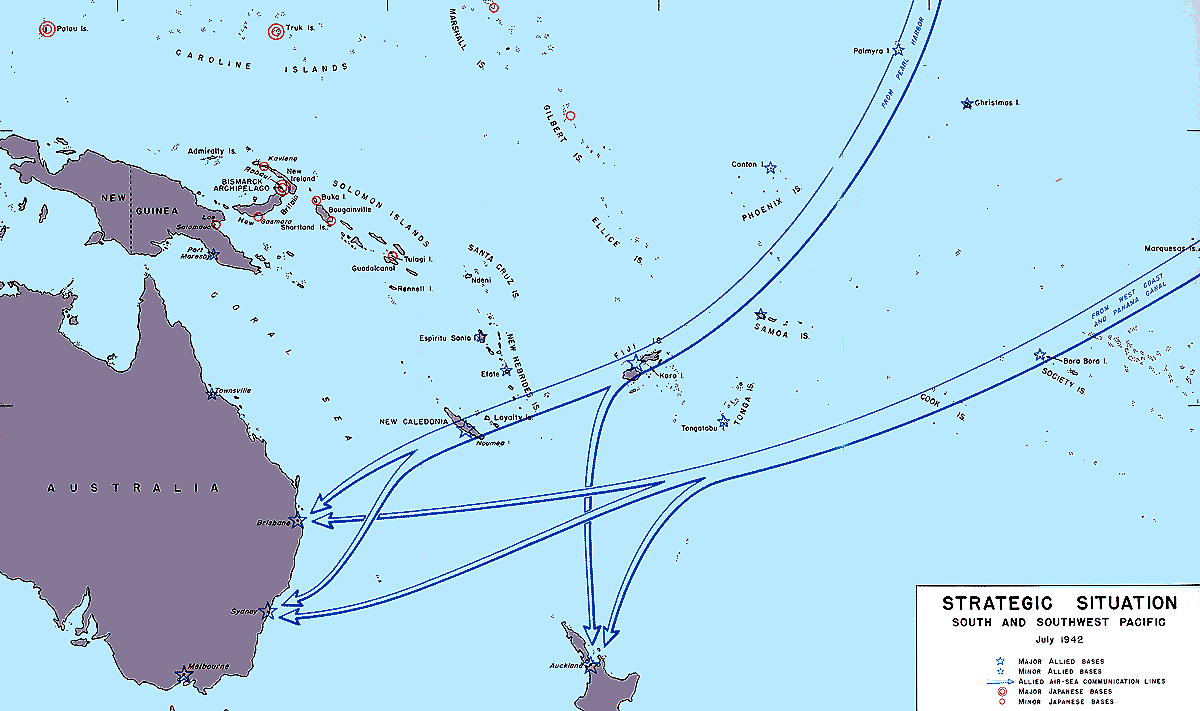
Strategic supply chain situation in South Pacific in July 1942

United States Merchant Navy routes durning World War 2, including Australia

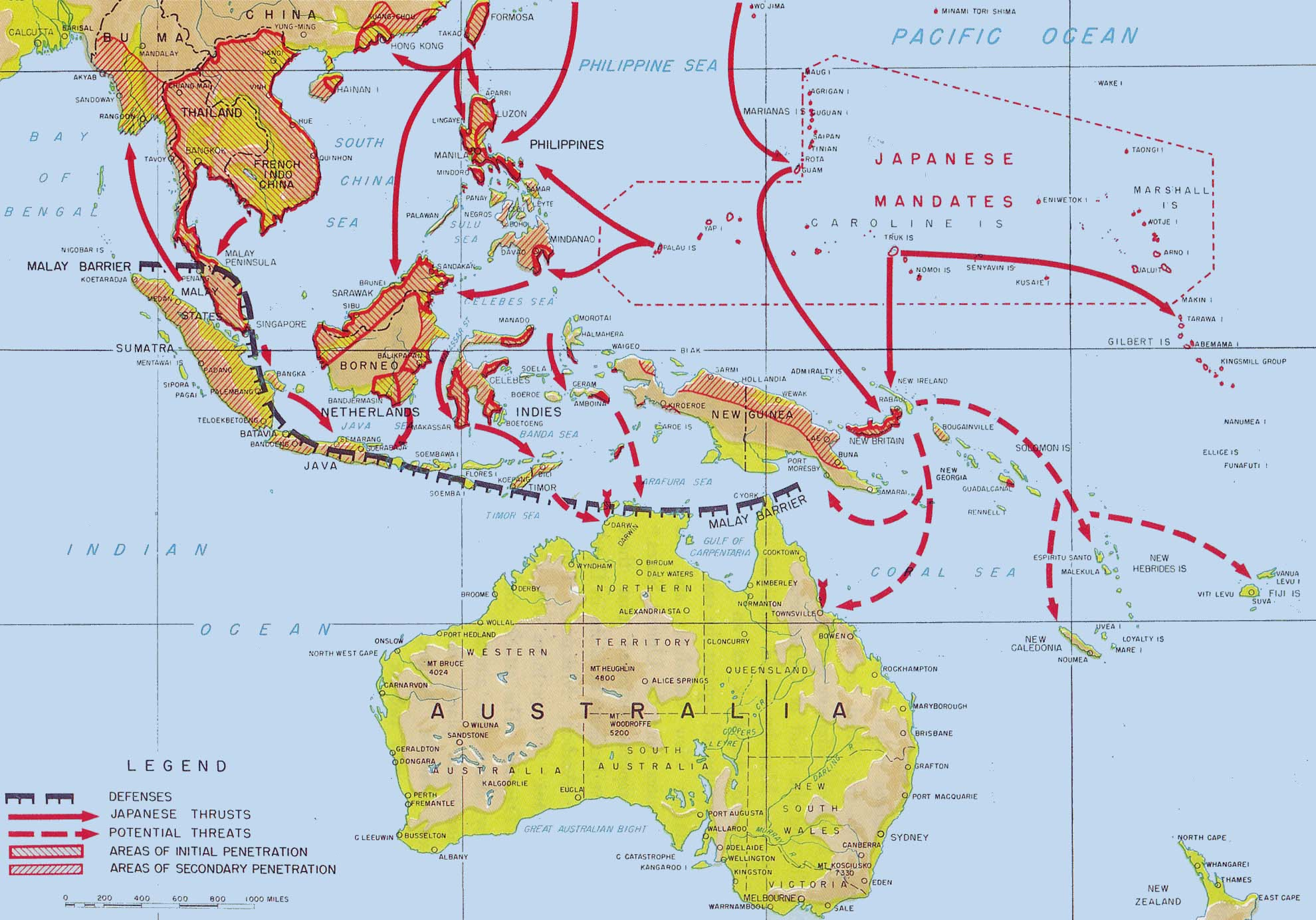
Japanese advances in the Southwest Pacific and Southeast Asia areas during the first five months of the Pacific Campaign of World War II. The proposed offensive on Fiji, Samoa, and New Caledonia is depicted in the lower right corner.

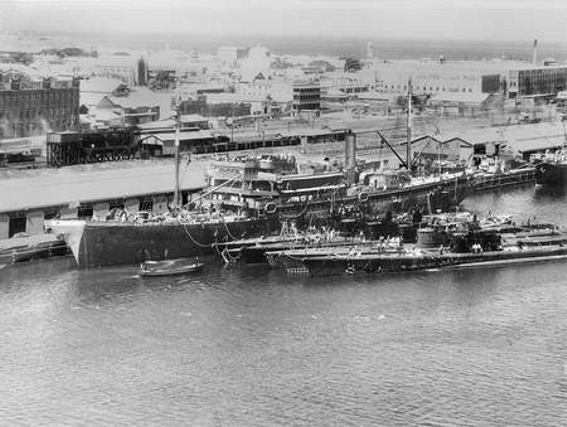
The submarine tender USS Holland with five American submarines at Fremantle submarine base in 1942

US Navy Seaplane Base Nedlands at Naval Base Perth in 1943

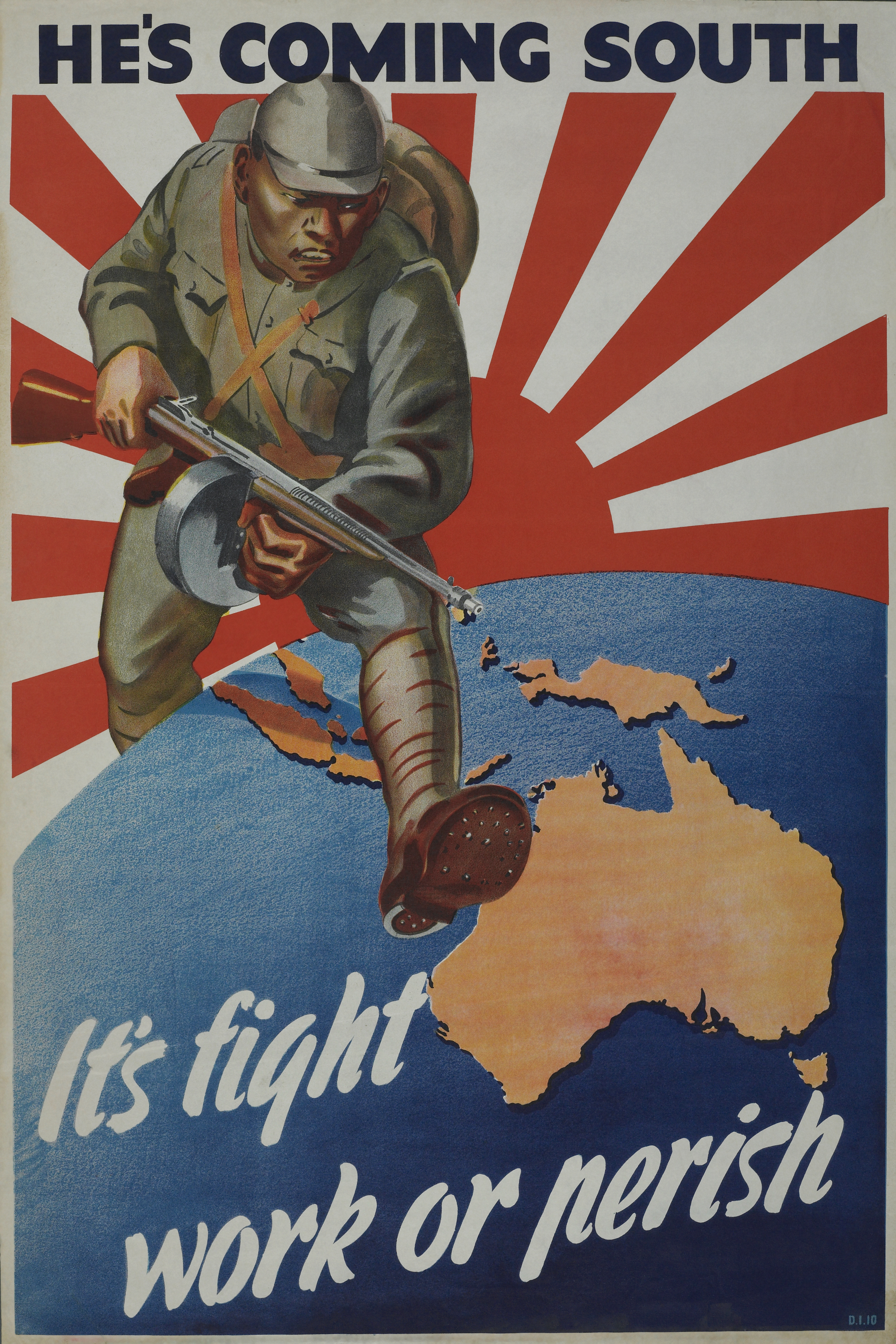
An Australian propaganda poster from 1942 referring to the threat of Japanese invasion. This poster was criticised for being alarmist when it was released and was banned by the Queensland government. Japan did have a plan.

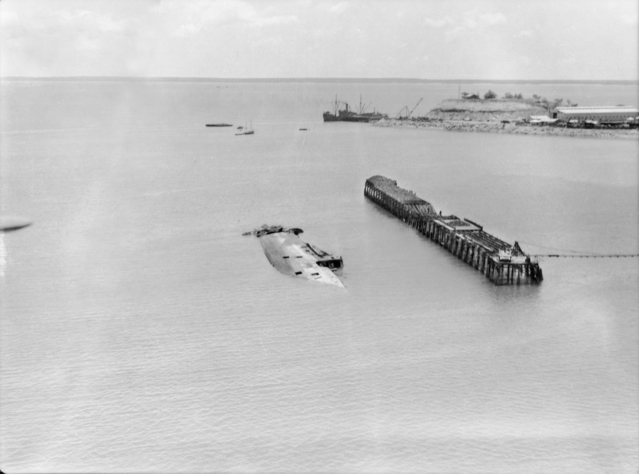
Darwin Harbour with the sunken ship MV Neptuna and burnt-out wharf of Naval Base Darwin following the attack on February 19, 1942

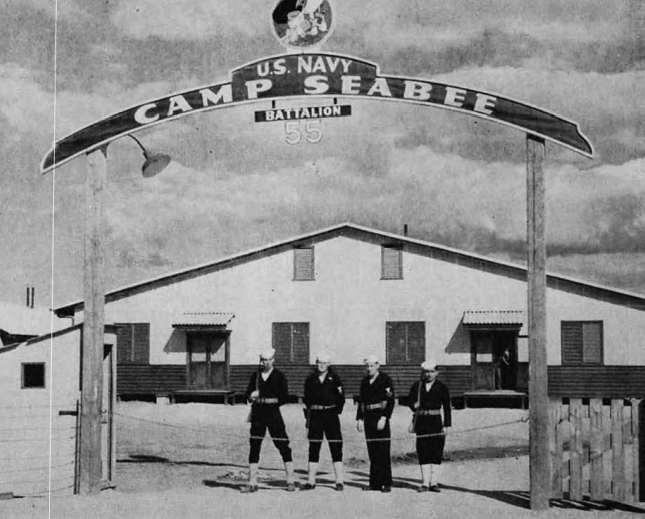
Camp Seabee gate at Eagle Farm, Brisbane

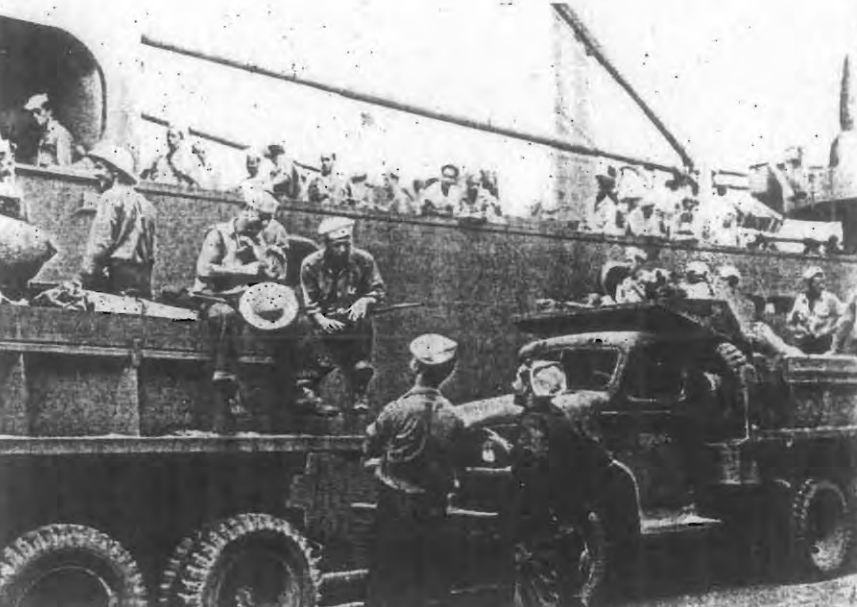
Camp Seabee Dock on Brisbane River

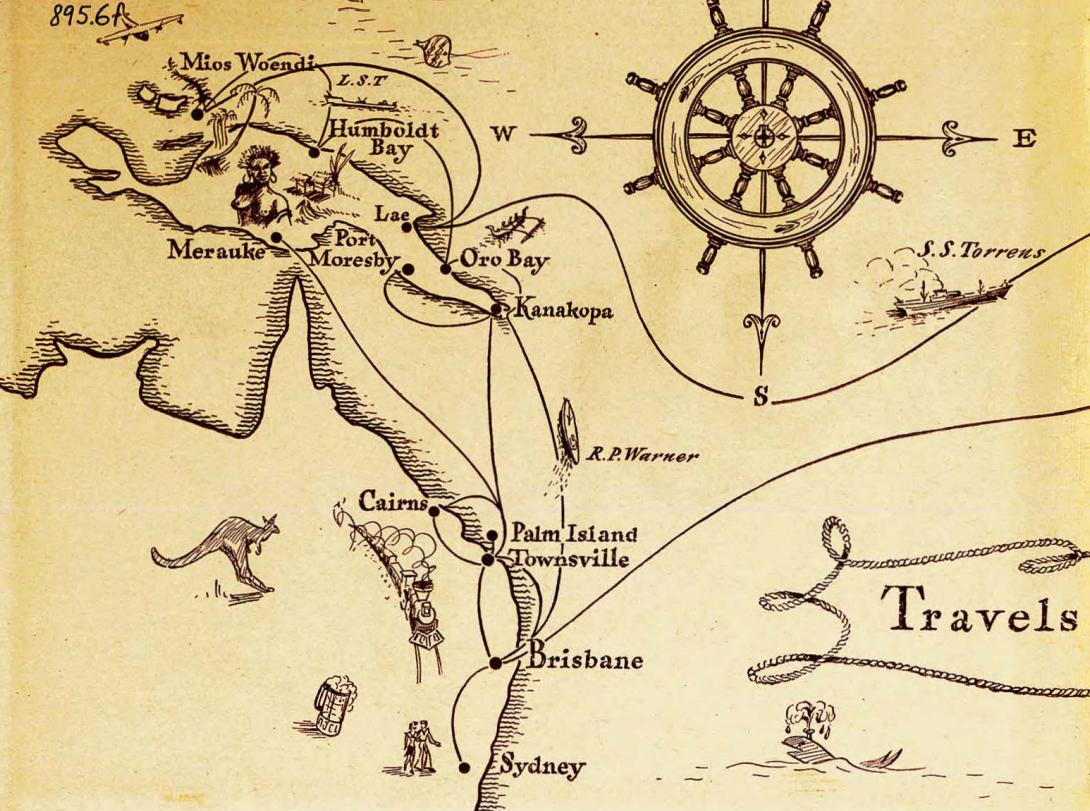
Camp Seabee Naval Base Brisbane, base building trips map

Seabees building Naval Air Station Palm Island in 1943

South Pacific islands in 1945

== See also ==
- Axis naval activity in Australian waters
- Christmas Island
- List of Royal Australian Navy bases
- US Naval Advance Bases
- US Naval Base Solomons
