= Naval Base Melbourne =

Former United States Navy Base

- Location within Australia
- Location: Victoria
- Coordinates: 37.817153°S 144.961093°E
- Established: 21 March 1942

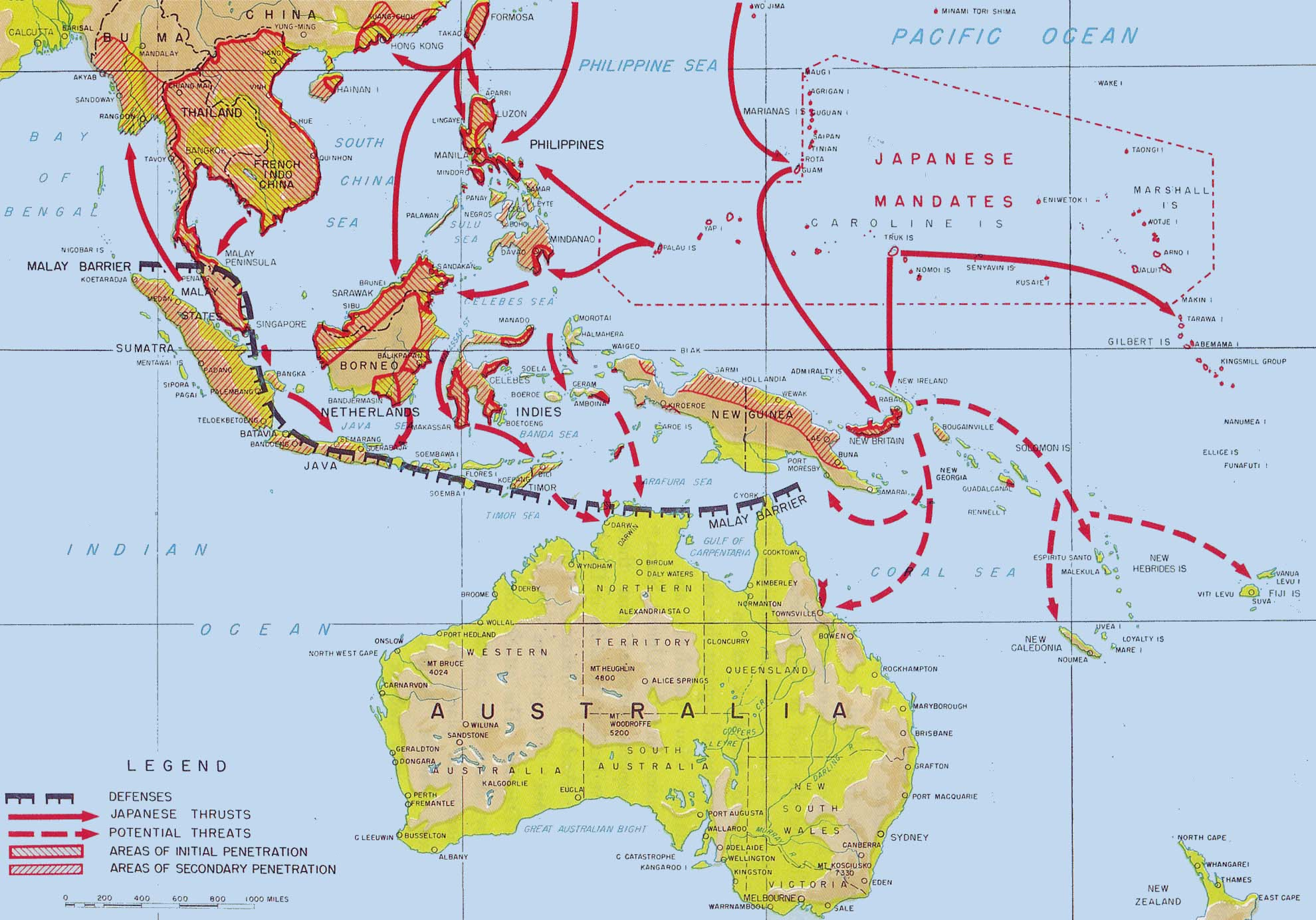
Japanese advances in the Southwest Pacific and Southeast Asia areas during the first five months of the Pacific Campaign of World War II. The proposed offensive on Fiji, Samoa, and New Caledonia is depicted in the lower right corner.

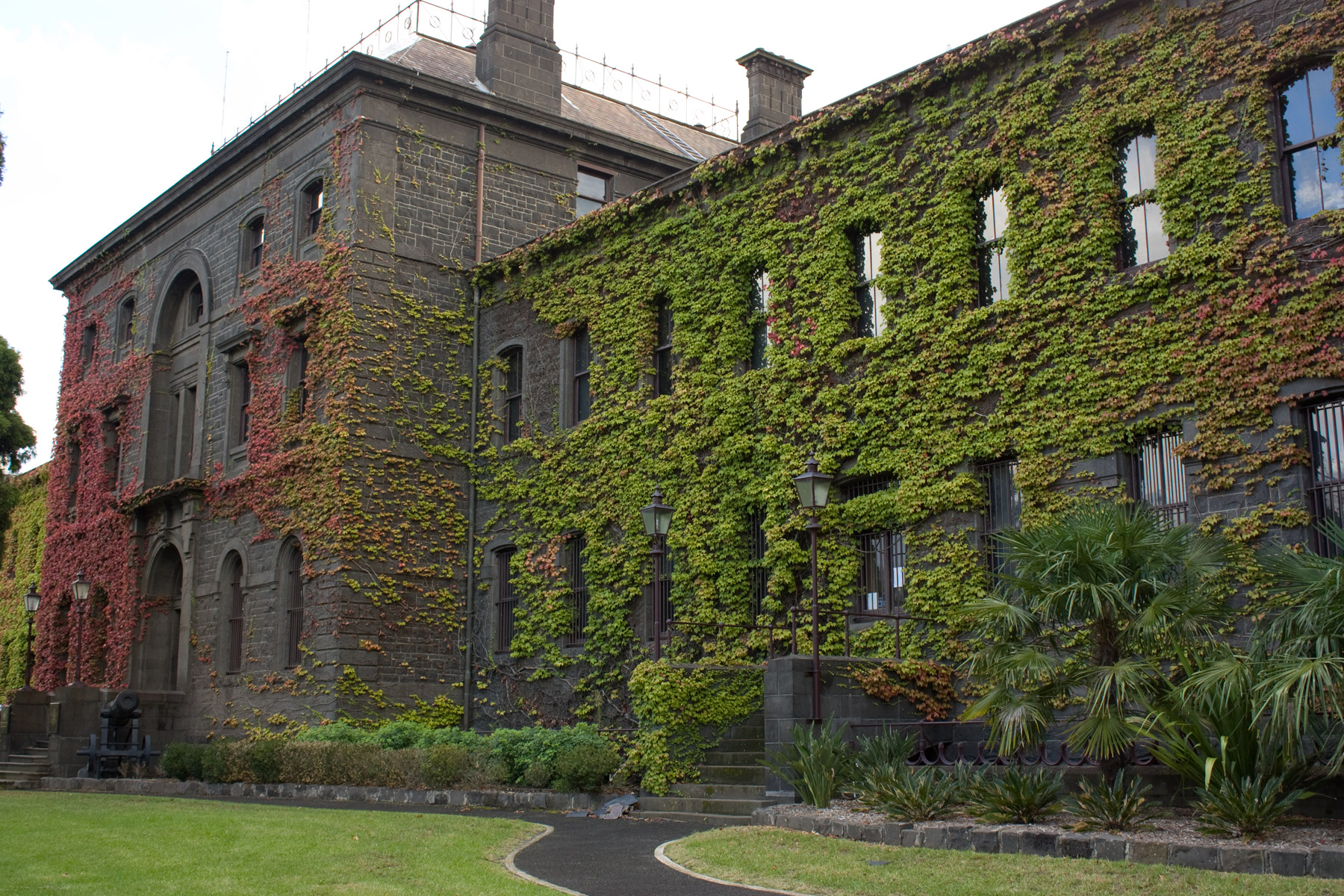
Victoria Barracks, Melbourne HQ for the US and Australian armed forces

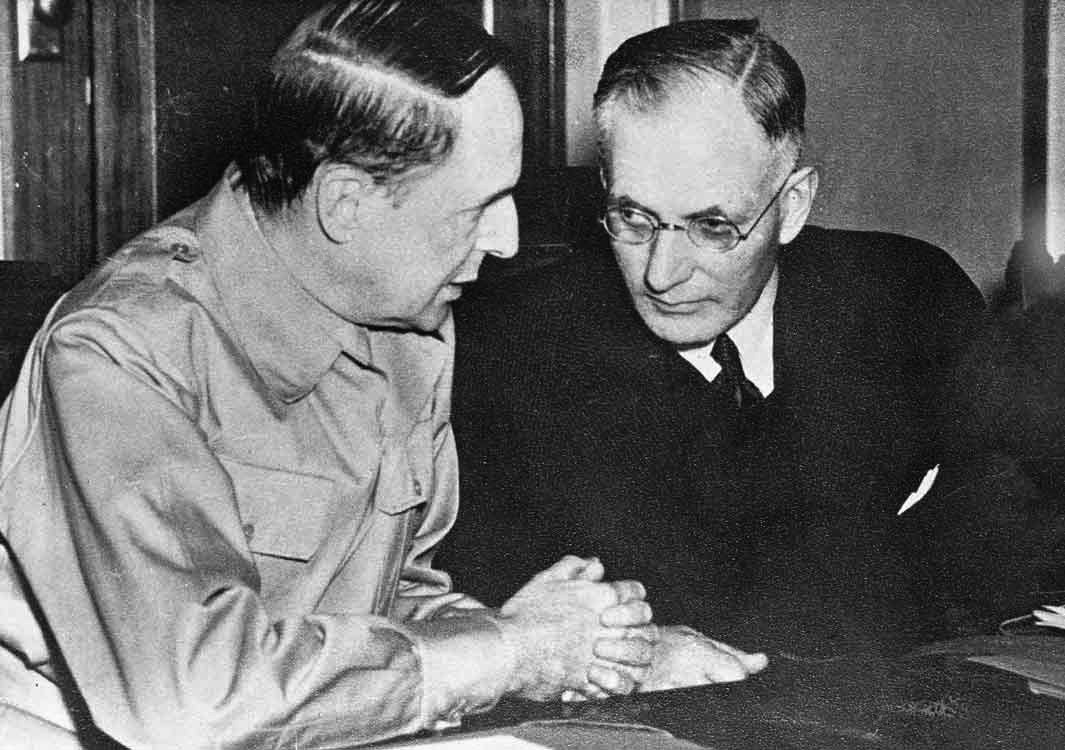
US General Douglas MacArthur, Commander of Allied forces in the South-West Pacific Area, with Australian Prime Minister John Curtin on 26 March 1942

Naval Base Melbourne was a United States Navy base at Melbourne during World War II. Naval Base Melbourne became the South West Pacific Area Command Headquarters after the 1941 invasion of the Philippines. General Douglas MacArthur, after escaping the Philippines, set up his Headquarters after his arrival on 21 March 1942. MacArthur was appointed Supreme Commander of all Allied Forces in the South West Pacific Area. The US Navy also set up a Headquarters a Melbourne, Allied Naval Forces Southwest Pacific Area under Commander Vice Admiral Herbert F. Leary. MacArthur and Leary used the empty Trustees Executive building at 401 Collins Street, Melbourne for headquarters. The Port of Melbourne had good fleet anchorage and docks. A new naval base was built at Brisbane, Australia, Naval Base Brisbane, and the Headquarters was moved to Brisbane in July 1942.

== History ==
With the loss of Naval Base Manila in 1941, the US Navy and United States Army need a safe South West Pacific port to stage a reply to Empire of Japan advances. Northern Australia ports were within reach of Japan long-range bombers. Bombing of Darwin on 19 February 1942, demonstrated a more southern port was needed. Melbourne, in southern Australia, was far away from any current or future attacks. The existing port facilities at Melbourne were large enough to support the staging of future action. Local civilians were hired to help in the unloading and loading of US Navy and US Army ships. The SS President Coolidge and SS Mariposa arrived at Melbourne on 1 February 1942 with supplies and munitions for the base and Australia. The ship also had troops and crafted P-40. The crew's leaders were sometimes called the "Remember Pearl Harbor" (RPH) Group or RPH staff. Other ships that were heading to now captured or in danger Pacific ports arrived at Melbourne. Melbourne became a staging place for 1942 convoys. On 16 July 1942 the SS Matsonia arrived at Melbourne with troops, most camped at Camp Murphy. The Melbourne Cricket Ground was used to house the staging of American and Australian troops, called Camp Murphy. The USS West Point (AP-23) arrived 4 September 1942 with more troops for Camp Murphy. US Army set up a camp at Victoria Barracks, Melbourne. MacArthur set up his HQ at first in the Hotel Australia. After the Battle of the Coral Sea, in May 1942, and the Battle of Midway in June 1942, the US Navy and Army later moved its Headquarters to Naval Base Brisbane in July 1942. Melbourne also became a rest and recuperation spot for US troops after Pacific War battles. The 1st Marine Division, 865 Officers and 17,335 men, rested at Melbourne after the Battle of Guadalcanal arriving on 12 January 1943 on the USS West Point (AP-23), protected by the USS Bagley (DD-386). Rest camps were Camp Robinson, Camp Murphy, Convalescent Camp Pell, Camp Balcombe, Mount Martha, and at Ballarat. Naval Base Melbourne was closed after the war.

== Geelong depot ==
Near Melbourne at Geelong, the US built a new ammunition depot. The Geelong depot was later named Kane Ammunition Depot, after a US Army 453d Ordnance Company crew member, who died in a convoy that departed Melbourne on 27 January 1942. His ship, Don Isidro was going to Corregidor in Manila to help the troops there. But in north Australia, his ship was attacked and ground on Bathurst Island, north of Darwin. Kane died in an Australian hospital at Darwin. Kane Ammunition Depot was run by the 25th Ordnance Medium Maintenance Company. The depot worked with the Townsville Naval Section Base, which had an Anti-aircraft Ordnance Training Center. The depot was closed after the war and is still abandoned today.

- Small depots were built at Melbourne suburbs: Seymour, Laverton and Kensington.

== Rowville Training Camp ==
At Rowville a US Marine training camp was built in May 1943, with support from the US Navy. The 1st Marines trained at the camp. Marines trained on field exercises live overhead firing, machine gun use, and mortar use. The camp was built by the Seabee 19th Battalion. The 19th Battalion also were the teachers of the use of some of the heavy equipment for the 17th Marine Engineering Regiment. In July 1943 the 3rd Battalion of the 17th Marines moved to Naval Base Cairns. The camp closed 30 September 1943 after the departure of the 7th Marines, 1st Battalion and 4th Battalion of the 11th Marines. Most of the camp is now a major electrical terminal station and Stud Park. The camp was at 37.928°S 145.230°E.

== Melbourne Convoys ==
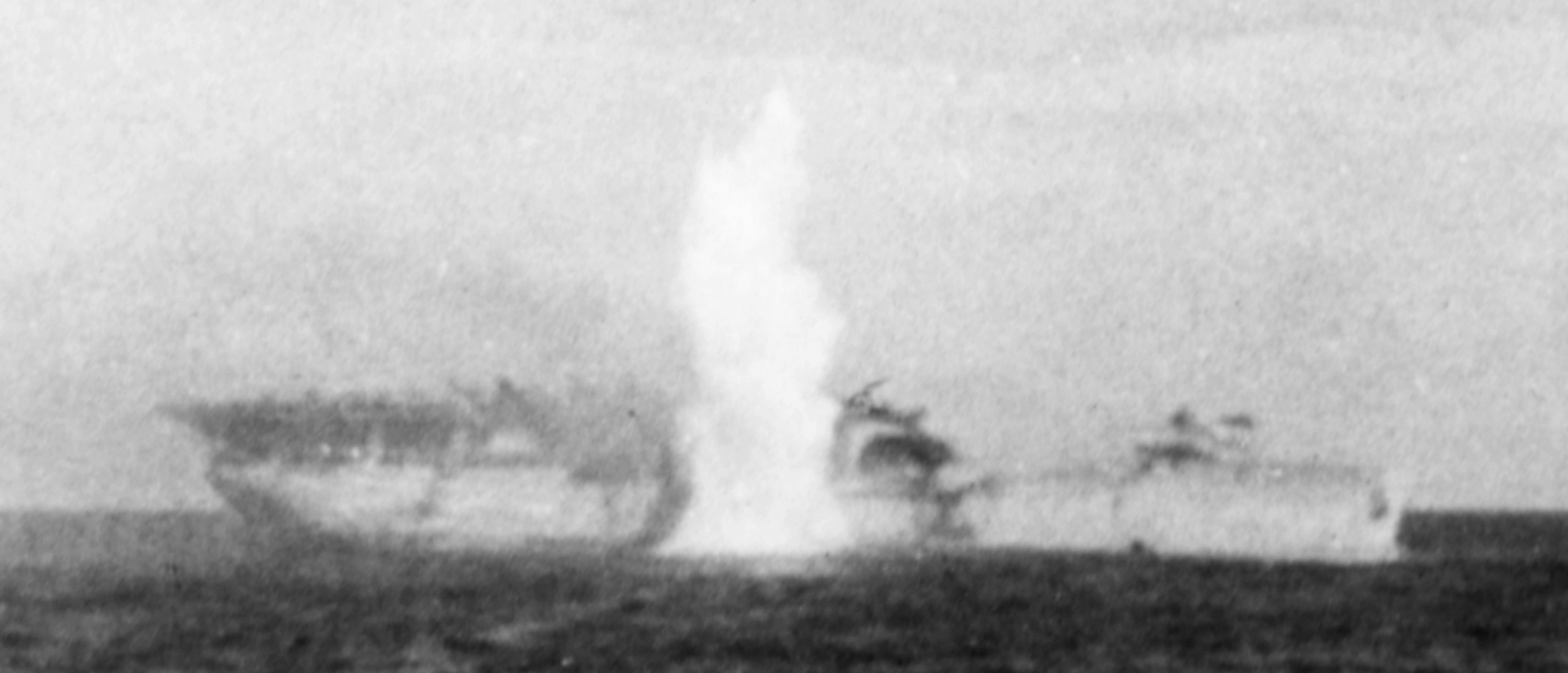
After departing Naval Base Melbourne the USS Langley was attacked by Empire of Japan, damage beyond repair, she was scuttled by torpedo on 27 February 1942 off Java

- Convoy MS-5 departed Melbourne on 22 February 1942. The convoy's goal was to reinforce the Netherlands East Indies. The Convoy included: MS Sea Witch with crafted Curtiss P-40 Warhawk aircraft, HMAS Katoomba, MV Duntroon, USAT Willard A. Holbrook and USS Langley (CV-1) that was sunk on the trip. The USS Whipple (DD-217) and USS Edsall (DD-219) joined the Convoy for added protection. The Troop ship Willard A. Holbrook had the US Army's 35th and 51st Pursuit Groups onboard. Empire of Japan two-engine naval land attack planes and six fighters attacked the convoy 74 miles from Tjilatjap on 27 February. Sixteen men from Langley died. The USS Pecos (AO-6) took on some of the survivors of the Langley.
- The convoy of ships with Troops and Curtiss P-40 Warhawk reached Melbourne on 1 February 1942 and departed for Perth on 2 February. The convoy was to go to India, but due to the invasion Philippines, the convoy returned to San Francisco.
- On 26 February 1942, the ships of Task Force 6814, with seven transport ships arrived at Melbourne harbor. Stayed in camps in and outside of city: Ballarat, Bendigo, Darley, Royal Park and Melbourne. Many Australians opened their home and the Troops had home-cooked meals. The Task Force reloaded and departed for New Caledonia on 6 March.
- Regular Convoys were started each with a code CO was for Newcastle to Melbourne and Adelaide ran from June 1942 to Dec. 1943 with 150 convoys, reverse trip called, OC. Convoy MS was from Melbourne to Singapore ran Jan. 1942 to March 1942 to support the British-led forces facing the Japanese invasion; 4 convoys. Convoy PV was from Melbourne to Townsville ran Sept. 1943 to Oct. 1943.
- Some ships that ports in Melbourne :USS General H. W. Butner (AP-113), USS Mount Vernon (AP-22), USS Victoria (AO-46), USS General George M. Randall (AP-115), SS America (1939), USS General W. A. Mann (AP-112), USS Altamaha (CVE-18), USS General John Pope (AP-110), USS Susan B. Anthony (AP-72), USS Yuma (AT-94), USS Phoenix (CL-46), USS General W. F. Hase (AP-146), SS President Cleveland (1920), USS General A. W. Greely (AP-141), USS Admiral W. S. Benson, USS Altamaha (CVE-18), USS ARD-10 to repair ships and others.

== Naval Intelligence Center ==
Station CAST was Naval intelligence center at Naval Base Cavite. With the fall of the Philippines the center was moved to Naval Base Manila's Corregidor Island. US Navy Cryptologists and other Naval intelligence personnel were taken off Corregidor Island by submarines on 8 April 1942 after the fall of Manila. Not all troops on Corregidor were evacuated, many became Prisoner of war and part of the Bataan Death March. The team set up a Naval Intelligence Center at Melbourne. The CAST team joined the Royal Australian Navy codebreakers at Melbourne. The two units became Fleet Radio Unit, Melbourne. To be low key the unit was based in the Monterey Apts on Arthur Street and the Moorabbin Town Hall. US Navy Communication Security Section of the Office of Naval Communications, since 1940 was able to decode some Japanese communication ciphers and codes. By March 1942 the center was able to decipher up to 15% of the Imperial Japanese Navy's Naval Codebook D, (US Navy label "JN-25B"). By May 1942 the US Navy was decoding up to 85% of the Ro code sent by Japan's Navy.

=== Fleet Radio Unit Radio Station ===
Naval Base Melbourne supported a remote post, Fleet Radio Unit Radio Station, at Adelaide River. The post was called USN Supplementary Radio Station Adelaide River and U.S. Naval Attachment, Fleet Radio Unit, Navy 136. It was run under the United States Seventh Fleet for the Naval Intelligence Center and opened in March 1943. A teleprinter line was run to Naval Intelligence Center so the info picked up could get to Naval Intelligence Center quickly. A DAB-3 HFDF was installed, a radio Direction Finding System, or Radio Direction Finder (RDF). The site was abandoned after the war. The Fleet Post Office FPO was 179 SF Adelaide River, Australia. Fleet Radio Unit Radio Station was supported by Naval Base Darwin.

== Airfields ==
The US Navy and other branches made some use of existing Airfields in Melbourne:

- Tullamarine Airfield now Melbourne Airport
- Essendon Airfield now Melbourne Essendon Airport
- Avalon Airport at Geelong depot
- Ballarat airfield now Ballarat Airport
- RAAF Base Point Cook Airfield 20 km (12 miles from Melbourne), also home to RAAF Museum at Point Cook.
- The Commonwealth Aircraft Corporation built aircraft and was used to reassemble crated aircraft arriving from the United States on US Navy ships.
- Department of Aircraft Production built aircraft Melbourne.
  - Outlining Airfields:
  - Lake Boga, Victoria Seaplane base
  - Wangaratta Airport
  - Werribee Airfield

== Battle of Melbourne ==
While most people in Melbourne welcomed the US arrival at Melbourne, problems between Australian Troop and US Troop peaked in 1942 and caused what is called the Battle of Melbourne on 1 December 1942. The Battle of Melbourne was a smaller riot between Australian Troops and US Troops. There were riots in Brisbane, Bondi on 6 February 1943, Perth in January 1944 and Fremantle in April 1944. During the war there was a news blackout of the event, due to the need to keep morale up.

== Post war ==
- After Victory over Japan Day the base closed and the US Navy started taking Troops home in Operation Magic Carpet.
- At Ballarat Gardens near Lake Wendouree is a marker plaque that reads:

"A tree that looks at god all day And lifts her leafy arms to pray. United States Marine Corps 1st Marine Division. This tree is to commemorate the Friendship established between The United States Marine and The citizens of Ballaarat during Their sojourn in early 1943"

- At Rowville's Stud Park is a marker noting the spot of the Rowville camp and the 1944 Italian Prisoner of war Camp.

== See also ==
- Naval Base Adelaide
- US Naval Advance Bases
- Eastern Area Command (RAAF)
- HM Naval Dockyard Williamstown
- US Naval Base Australia

== Sources ==
- Lundstrom, John B. (2006). Black Shoe Carrier Admiral: Frank Jack Fletcher at Coral Sea, Midway, and Guadalcanal. Annapolis, Maryland: Naval Institute Press. ISBN 1-59114-475-2.
- Parker, Frederick D. (2017) [First published 1993]. "Part One: The Battle of the Coral Sea". A Priceless Advantage: U.S. Navy Communications Intelligence and the Battles of Coral Sea, Midway, and the Aleutians (PDF) (Monograph). Series IV: World War II. Vol. 5 (3rd ed.). Fort George G. Meade, Maryland: Center for Cryptologic History, National Security Agency. OCLC 1124074152. Archived (PDF) from the original on 21 October 2020.
- Parshall, Jonathan; Tully, Anthony (2005). Shattered Sword: The Untold Story of the Battle of Midway. Dulles, Virginia: Potomac Books. ISBN 1-57488-923-0.
- Prados, John (1995). Combined Fleet Decoded: The Secret History of American Intelligence and the Japanese Navy in World War II. New York: Random House. ISBN 0-679-43701-0.
- Willmott, H. P. (2002). The War with Japan: The Period of Balance, May 1942 – October 1943. Wilmington, Delaware: Scholarly Resources Inc. ISBN 0-8420-5032-9.
