= Naval Base Brisbane =

Major World War 2 base in Australia

- Brisbane, Queensland in Australia

Site information
- Type: Naval base
- Owner: United States Navy
- Operator: United States Navy

Location
- Location in Queensland
- Coordinates: 27.442041°S 153.092935°E

Site history
- Built: 1942
- Built by: Seabee and civilian contractors
- In use: 1942 - 14 January 1946

Naval Base Brisbane was a major United States Navy base built in the early part of World War II at Brisbane, Queensland, Australia. At first, it operated as a base for patrol aircraft and convoy escort aircraft to protect the last leg of the Pacific War to the Southwest Pacific. As the US Navy expanded in the island hopping campaign, Naval Base Brisbane expanded to include a submarine base, repair depot, seaplane base and other facilities. US Navy operations started on April 14, 1942, and ended after the war in 1945.

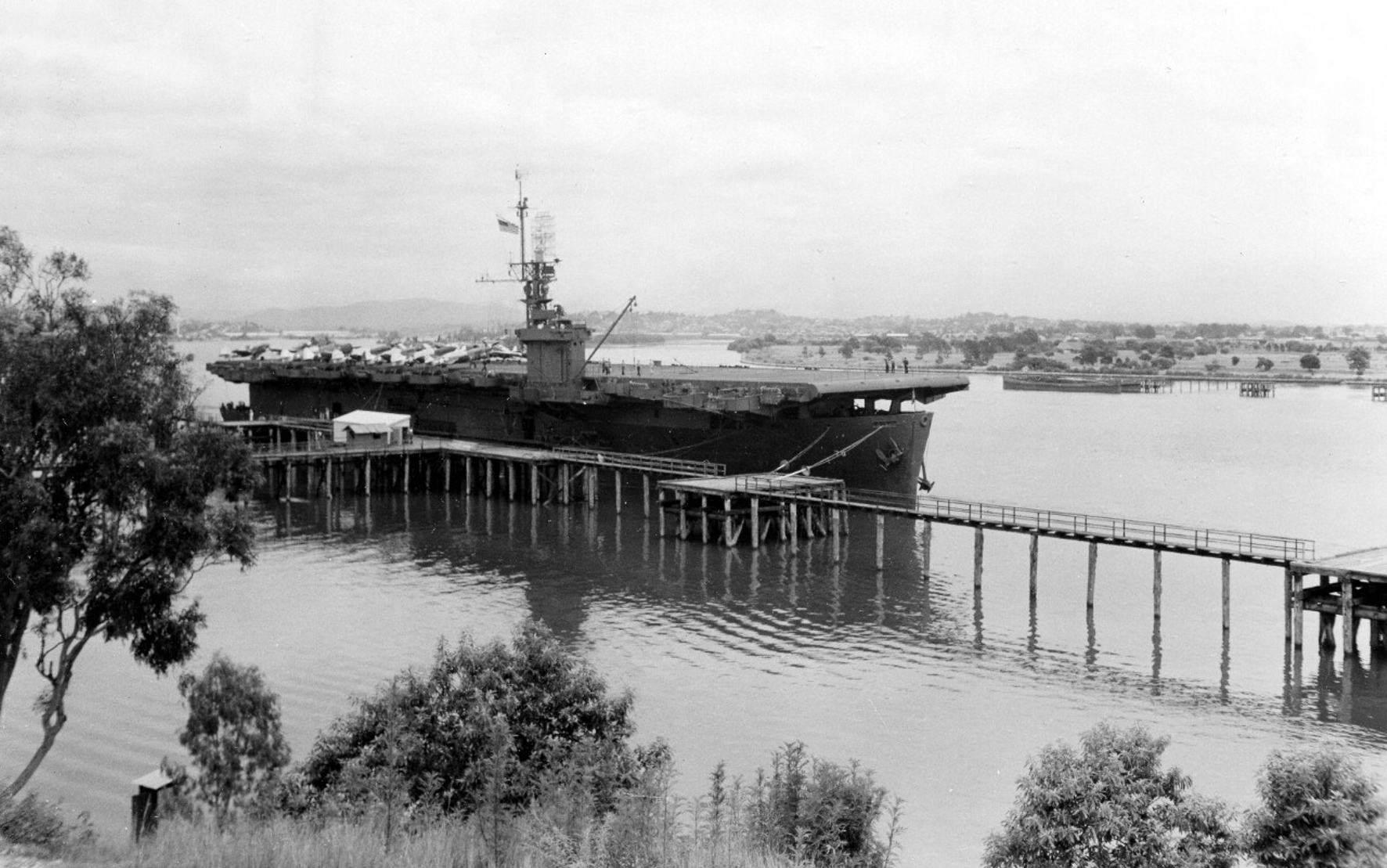
USS Fanshaw Bay (CVE-70) moored at Brisbane, Australia, 10 February 1944

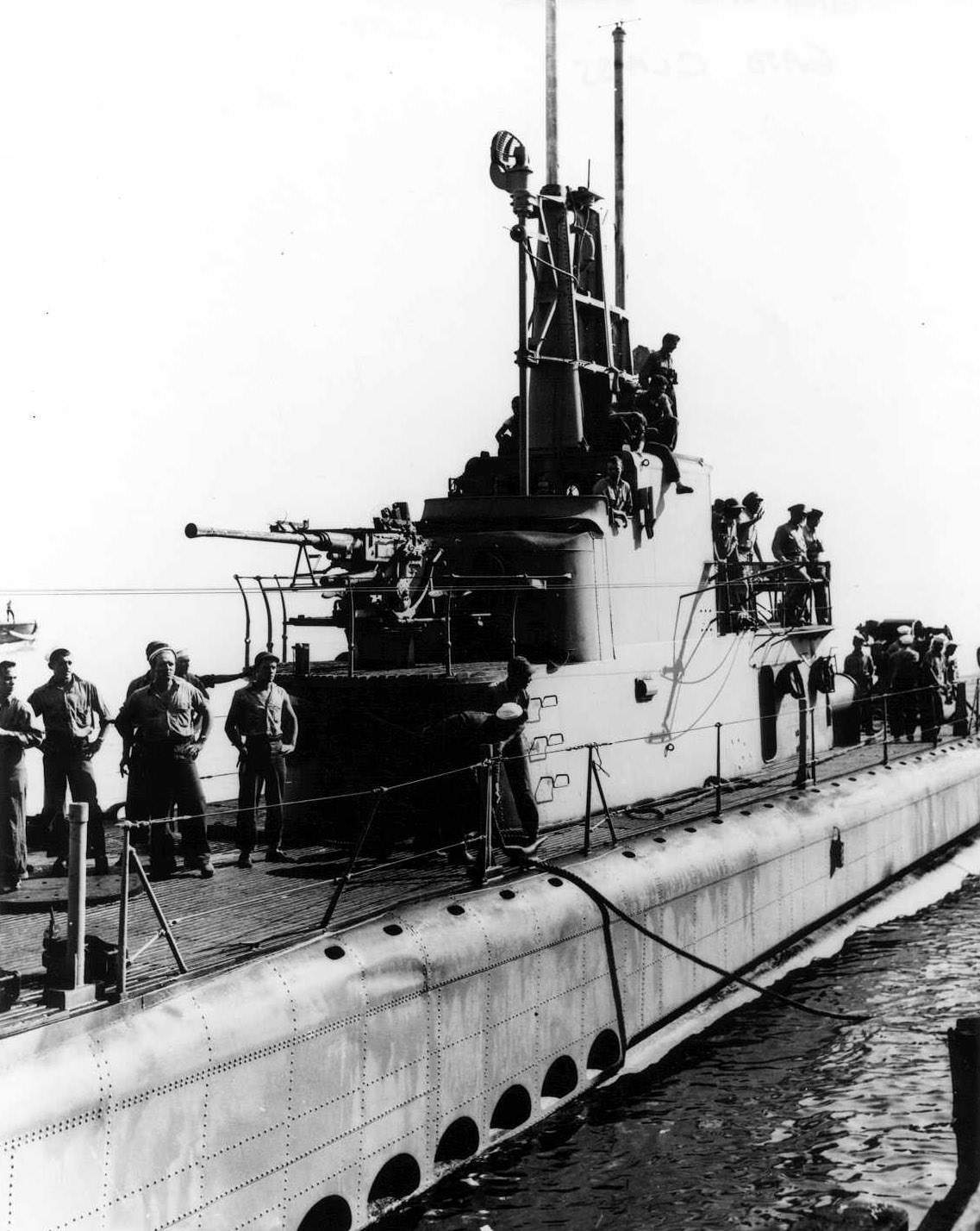
USS Gabilan in Brisbane in 1944

== History ==
Australia entered World War II on September 3, 1939, being a self-governing nation within the British Empire. The United States formally entered the war on December 7, 1941, following the Japanese bombing of Pearl Harbor. On April 14, 1942, the USS Griffin (AS-13) and a fleet of eleven S-class US submarines arrived at Brisbane's New Farm Wharf. The wharf had a few storage sheds and some other support facilities, which the US Navy rented using the reverse Lend-Lease program, but a much larger facility was needed as a staging area. The US Government hired Australian construction crews to build a new staging area using mostly Australian supplies but with Quonset huts shipped in.

The S-class submarines' first mission was supporting the Solomon Islands campaign. Later, Gato-class submarines were added to the fleet. By the end of the war the Brisbane submarine fleet had sunk 117 enemy ships, totaling 515,000 tons, and rescued many downed airmen. In the spring of 1943, more space was needed and on March 24, 1943, the US Navy Seabee's 55th Battalion arrived and built "Camp Seabee", 5 miles north-east of Brisbane, at Eagle Farm. Camp Seabee became a staging camp for Seabees and their equipment in island hopping operations. The first departure was half the Seabees, to build Naval Base Milne Bay in New Guinea on May 23, 1943. Some Seabees departed to build an airfield at Merauke in New Guinea and others to Port Moresby, New Guinea. Most returned at the end of the construction for R&R. The Brisbane Seabees built a mine depot outside of Brisbane. The next departure was most of the Brisbane Seabees going to Palm Island and Cairns. At Palm Island, Seabees built Palm Island Naval Air Station and Palm Island Seaplane Base. Seabees built the Cairns Harbor PT-Boat Base and Cairns Harbor Seaplane Base. At Cairns, Seabees built the Cairns Airfield used for patrols and a staging camp. On June 19, 1943, the Seabee 84th Battalion arrived at Camp Seabee, with half the Battalion departing to continue the expansion at Naval Base Milne Bay. The 55th and 84th Battalion continued to build up Naval Base Brisbane. Seabees built a mine depot, more barracks at Camp Seabee, a Merchant Marine anti-aircraft training camp, and Mobile Navy Hospital No. 9. In May 1943, Seabee 60th Battalion arrived at Camp Seabee. On January 20, 1944, Seabee Construction Battalion Maintenance Unit 544th arrived to service the Naval Base Brisbane Bases. At Hamilton, Queensland, Seabees built a ship-repair depot. Outside of the base, an ammunition depot was built. The 55th Battalion built and operated a sawmill. By March 1994 the base had 90,000 square feet of depot warehouse space and 53 acres of open deposit storage. The other large US Naval Advance Bases in Australia were at Naval Base Sydney and Naval Base Darwin. Unlike Darwin, Brisbane was out of the reach of Japanese bombers. Parts of Naval Base Brisbane began moving to more forward bases in January 1944. Palm Island base was moved on September 1, 1944, and Townsville moved in July 1944.

== Bases and facilities ==
- Brisbane, Queensland Bases:
- United States Seventh Fleet:

=== Naval Base Brisbane ===
- Naval Base Brisbane on the Brisbane River
  - Navy Headquarters, from Naval Base Melbourne in July 1942.
  - New Farm Wharf depot, now New Farm Park ferry wharf
  - AHS Centaur, USS Samaritan (AH-10) and USS Comfort (AH-6) Hospital ships
  - Brisbane Submarine base
    - Some Submarines Base at Brisbane:S-47, S-41, S-39, S-44, S-40, S-42, S-37, Scamp, Grayback, Darter, Growler, Crevalle, Seawolf, Gato, Sturgeon, Trout, Pintado, Seadragon, Dace, Narwhal, Permit, Nautilus, Bonefish, Silversides, Perch, Guardfish, Grampus, Medregal, Segundo, Greenling, Greenling, S-38, Amberjack, Sailfish, Cisco, Tiru, Swordfish, Sculpin, Ray, Albacore, Wahoo, Stingray, Gilmer, Seahorse, Spearfish, Tunny, Drum, Seahorse, Argonaut, Sterlet, Plunger, S-31, Bluefish, Cero, Gar, Flying Fish, Pollack, Tuna, Guardfish, Caiman, Pompon, Cod, Raton, Guavina, Bowfin, Grouper, Grouper, Blackfish, Rasher, Balao, Corvina
  - Submarine maintenance depot
  - Submarine training center
  - Brisbane Degaussing Station
  - Crash boat base
  - Fleet Post Office FPO# 134 SF Brisbane
  - Barracks
  - Supply depot
- Ammunition depot, Brisbane Navy 134 at Mount Coot-tha
  - Mine depot outside of the city
  - Mobile Explosives Investigation Unit. No.1
- Archerfield shared with Army, just south of Brisbane.
- Camp Perry Park, Navy housing unit at Camp Perry Park
- Toowoomba Recreation Center, at Toowoomba west of Brisbane
- Coolangatta Recreation Center at Coolangatta, south of Brisbane
- Transmitting Station at Colmslie

=== Naval Air Station Brisbane ===
Naval Air Station Brisbane was based in Colmslie on the Brisbane River.

- Naval Base Colmslie
- NATS Seaplane Base Colmslie (now Colmslie Recreational Park)
- Colmslie Seaplane workshop, repair of Navy Consolidated PBY Catalina planes
- Navy and Pan Am radio station, Pan Am used the base for mail and other services.
- Imperial Airways, BOAC, RAAF and Qantas also use the base.
  - Post war became Barrier Reef Airways base

=== Hamilton repair depot ===
- Repair depot
- Hamilton repair depot in Hamilton on the Brisbane River.
- Cairncross Dockyard
- Supply depot
- Machine shops
- Engineering camp
- Chemical Engineering Camp
- Some repair ship at Brisbane:
- USS Howard W. Gilmore (AS-16)
- USS Remus (ARL-40)
- USS Clytie
- USS Fulton (AS-11)
- USS Sperry (AS-12)
- USS Wachapreague (AGP-8)
- USS Satinleaf (AN-43)
- USS Sonoma (AT-12)
- USS Geronimo (ATA-207)
- USS Wright (AV-1)
- USS Coucal (ASR-8)
- USS Mataco (AT-86)
- USS Portunus (AGP-4)
- USS Oyster Bay (AGP-6)
- SS Stratheden
- USS Tangier (AV-8)
- USS Dobbin (AD-3)

=== Camp Seabee ===
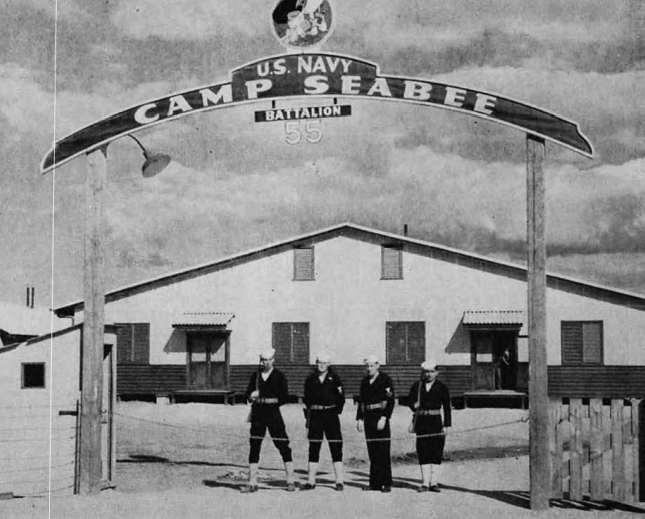
Camp Seabee gate at Eagle Farm

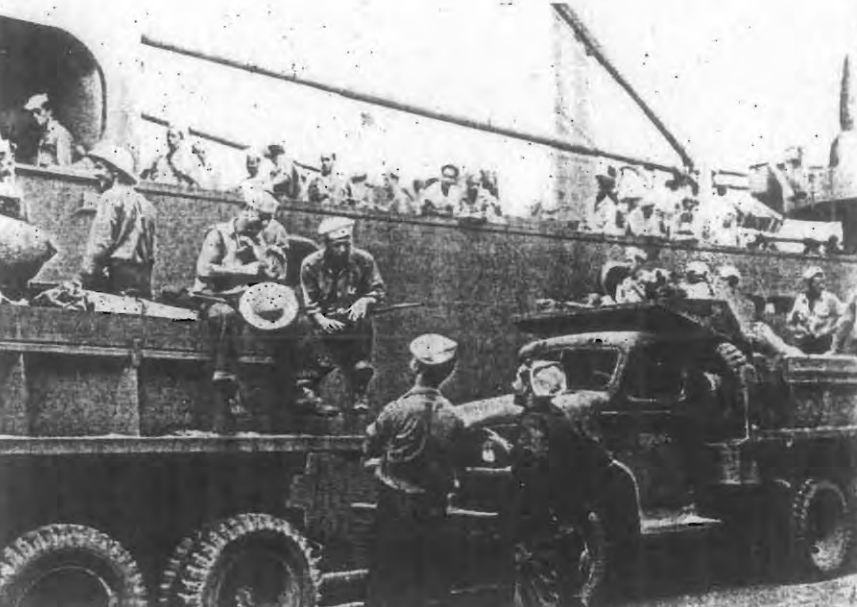
Camp Seabee Dock on Brisbane River

- Camp Seabee at Eagle Farm on the Brisbane River in Brisbane
  - Camp Seabee
  - Camp Seabee staging camp and depot
  - Merchant Marine Anti-aircraft training camp, Wellington Point Gunnery School at Wellington Point
  - Advanced Base Construction Depot (ABCD)
  - Mobile Navy Hospital No. 9, with 3,000 beds
  - Theater
  - Recreation building
  - Laundry depot
  - Power station
  - Decomposed granite quarry for roads.
  - Eagle Farm Airfield, shared with Army
  - Allison Engine Testing Area

Camp Seabee was home to the:

- 19th Construction Battalion Special
- 20th Construction Battalion
- 55th Construction Battalion
- 60th Construction Battalion
- 77th Construction Battalion
- 84th Construction Battalion
- 91st Construction Battalion
- Amphibious Construction Battalion 1 - 104th Naval Construction Battalion
- 115th Construction Battalion
- 138th Naval Construction Battalion
- Naval Mobile Construction Battalion 11

From the staging at Camp Seabee, Construction Battalions departed to help build:

- Naval Base Cairns
- Naval Air Station Palm Island
- Townsville Naval Section Base
- Thursday Island PT Boat Base
- Naval Base Sydney
- Naval Base Merauke
- KanaKopa PT Boat Base
- Oro Bay Airfield
- Naval Base Lae - Landing at Lae
- Naval Base Mios Woendi at Mios Woendi PT Boat Base and Owi Airfield
- Naval Base Woodlark Island
- Naval Base Milne Bay
- Naval Base Finschhafen
- Naval Base Hollandia
- Kiriwina Airfield
- Naval Base Cape Gloucester - Battle of Cape Gloucester
- Naval Base Alexishafen, at Madang
- Naval Base Morotai - Battle of Morotai
- Naval Base Banika Island on Banika:
  - Renard Field and Banika Field
  - Renard Sound Seaplane Base
- Naval Base Saipan
- Naval Base Okinawa
- Naval Base Amsterdam Island on Amsterdam Island, West Papua, PT Boat Base
- Leyte-Samar Naval Base 60th CB
- Naval Base Guadalcanal - Guadalcanal campaign 61th CB
  - Tenaru Camp - Battle of the Tenaru
  - Koli Point Camp - Koli Point action
  - Naval Base Lunga at Lunga Point
  - Henderson Field 6th CB
- Naval Base Manicani Repair base
- Radar Station at Auki for RNZA 60th CB
- Naval Base Emirau 60th CB on Emirau Island
- Naval Base Darwin 84th CB
- Naval Base Puerto Princesa at Palawan 84th CB
- Naval Base Manus
- Naval Base Treasury Islands
  - Torokina Airfield
  - Piva Airfield
- Naval Base Lingayen - Sual Bay PT Boat Base 104th CB
- Naval Base Subic Bay
- Olongapo Naval Station Olongapo Camp, 115th CB
- NAS Attu 138th CB on Attu Island
- Naval Base Auckland at Auckland
- Bases in the Aleutian Islands 138th CB

=== Other camps ===
- Camp La Fayette Prison Stockade at Eagle Farm
- Camp Whinstanes, Prison

== Remote Advanced Bases ==
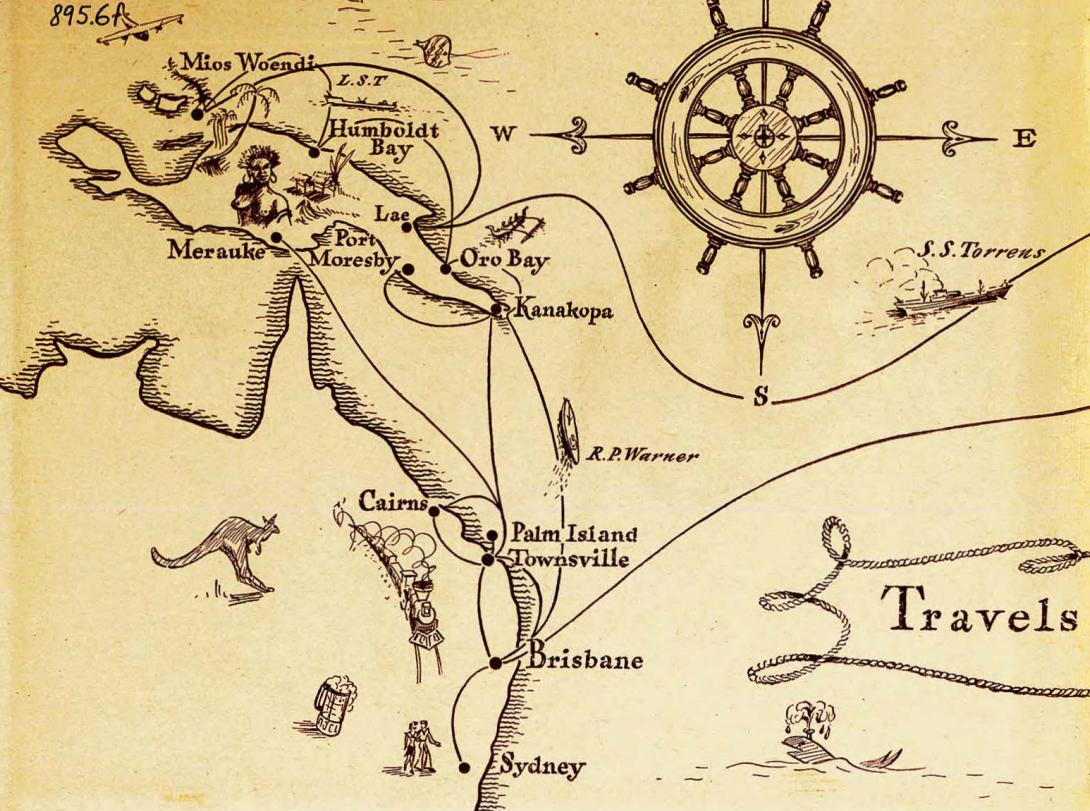
Camp Seabee Naval Base Brisbane, base building trips

Naval Base Brisbane built and supported remote advanced bases in Queensland:

=== Naval Base Cairns ===
Naval Base Cairns at Cairns, north of Brisbane, closed January 7, 1945 (now HMAS Cairns). Part of the base was on Green Island, 28 km (17 mi) offshore.

  - Cairns Harbor PT-Boat Base, later moved to Milne Bay
  - Cairns Harbor Seaplane Base
  - PT Boat repair base
  - Escort Base One destroyer repair depot
  - US Amphibious Training Base
  - Naval mine maintenance depot
  - Patrol-craft repair depot
  - Supply depot
  - Mess hall
  - Navy hospital
  - Feet post office FPO# 144 SF Cairns, Australia
  - Floating drydocks: AFD-10, ARD-7
  - 600-foot timber wharf
  - 5,000-gallon water tank farm
  - Ammunition depot outside of camp
  - Cairns Airfield used for patrols
  - Cairns staging camp
  - Trinity Bay, amphibious training, US Army, Navy with US Navy support.
  - Sheridan Street Camp, Cairns Army Camp located along Sheridan, Dutton and Spence Street.

Seabees building Seaplane Base Palm Island in 1943

- Naval Air Station Palm Island
  - Naval Air Station Palm Island, at Palm Island north of Brisbane, started July 6, 1943, closed June 1, 1944.
  - VPB-29 Patrol Bomber unit
  - VP-11 Patrol Squadron with Consolidated PBY Catalina
  - Hangars
  - Seaplane Base Palm Island
  - Fleet Post Office FPO# 420 SF Palm Island, Australia
  - Naval Air Station Wallaby Point
  - 60,000 barrels tank farm
  - Palm Island patrol bombers repair depot
  - Docks
  - Radio stations
  - PT boat bases
  - Hospitals
  - Naval mine depot
  - Power station
  - Supply base

=== Townsville Naval Section Base ===
- Townsville Naval Section Base
  - North of Brisbane a section base was built a Townsville closed and moved July 1944.
  - Rose Bay Townsville Navy hospital, 120-bed
  - Ammunition depot outside of camp
  - Fleet Post Office FPO# 143 SF Townsville, Australia
  - Townsville Navy hospital, 100-bed
  - Black River Navy hospital
  - US Navy at Cleveland Bay
  - Army camp, staging
  - Army airfields and Army 12th Station Hospital
  - HMAS Magnetic Royal Australian Navy base near US base

=== Horn Island Seaplane Base ===
  - Horn Island Seaplane Base at small Horn Island, far north of Brisbane
  - Horn Island Airport RAAF

=== Thursday Island PT Boat Base ===
- Thursday Island PT Boat Base was built on Thursday Island, far north of Brisbane, by the Seabees. The base opened in February 1943 and closed in September 1945. Thursday Island PT Boat Base had a PT Boat repair depot. The base was shared, HMAS Carpentaria base. The US also stationed some submarine bases at the base.

=== Toorbul Combined Training Centre ===
Toorbul Combined Training Centre (CTC) was a joint Army and Navy amphibious training center opened on the summer of 1942 at Toorbul on Toorbul Point, now called Sandstone Point. The center had classrooms, camp, mess hall, jetties, slipway, a mock ship, and workshops. Royal Australian Air Force also had Radar Station at the base. Fleet PO Box was 146.

=== Other bases ===
- Fleet Radio Unit Radio Station Cooktown at Cooktown, Queensland. FPO# 813 SF Cooktown
- For Prisoner of war 16 camps were built in Queensland by Australians and US.
- Mareeba Airfield (Hoevet Field) US Army
- Torrens Creek Airfield in Torrens Creek, US Army, now Torrens Creek Airport
- Mackay Airfield and Mackay recreation facilities at Mackay, Queensland

== Post war ==
- After Victory over Japan Day the base closed and the US Navy started taking Troops home in Operation Magic Carpet.

A number of Memorials were built in memory of the World War II activities in Australia:

- Catalina Memorial Cairns Esplanade, at Cairns Esplanade near Cairns Harbor. Three white pillars with a model of a Consolidated Catalina atop and a memorial plaque to the crew of Catalina A24-25, at 16.913447°N 145.770323°E
- Cairns War Cemetery, administered by the Commonwealth War Graves Commission (CWGC) at 16.90787°N 145.7535°E
- Cairns Museum
- Beck Museum in Mareeba, closed
- Milne Bay Military Museum in Toowoomba
- Townsville War Cemetery at 19.24631°N 146.7879°E
- Centaur Park, Memorial plaque and park dedicated to AHS Centaur sunk offshore at 26.802784°S 153.146869°E in Caloundra.
- Bundaberg War Cemetery in Bundaberg at 24.866066°S 152.348909°E.
- Memorial at Bakers Creek in Bakers Creek.

== Gallery ==
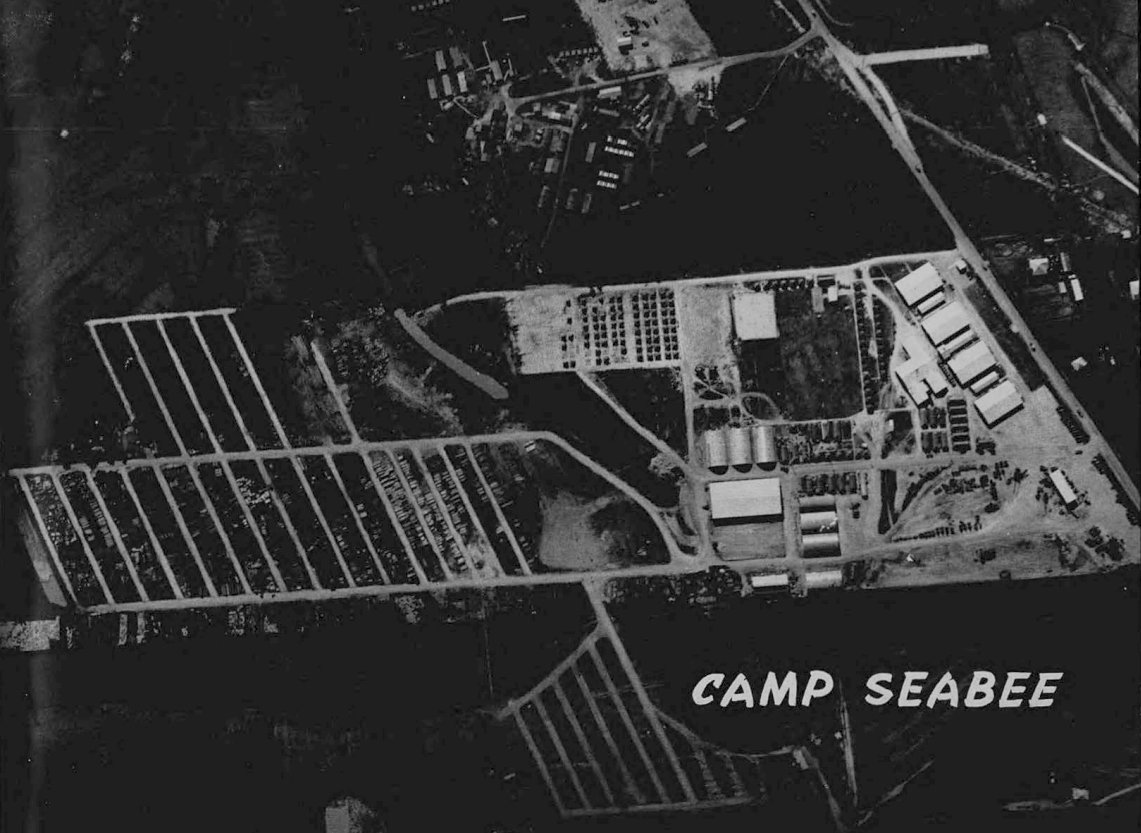
Camp Seabee at Naval Base Brisbane from the air

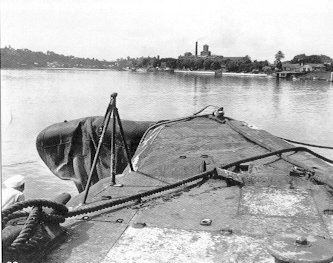
Damaged USS Growler at the submarine base at New Farm in February 1943

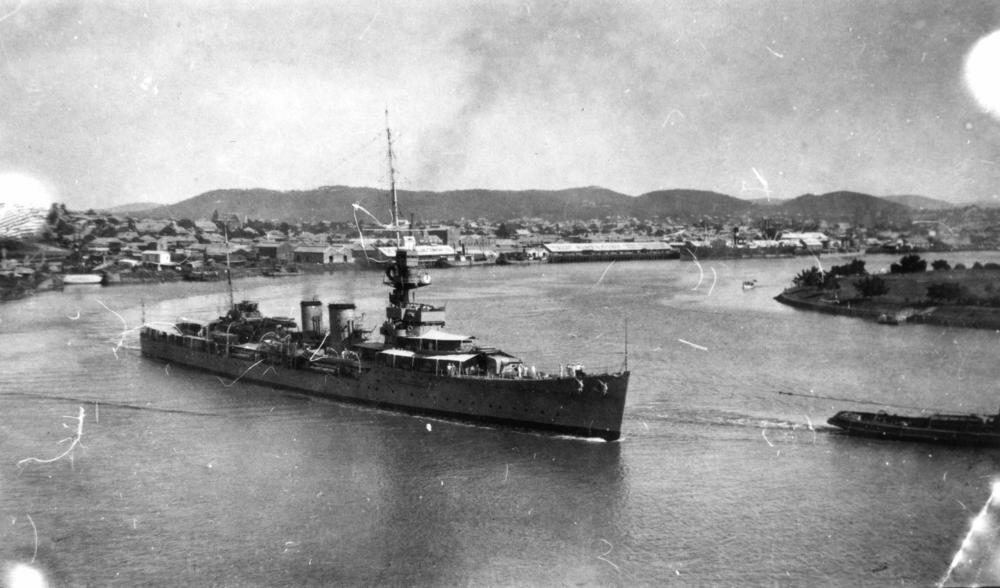
Dunedin at Gardens Reach on the Brisbane River. South Brisbane wharves in background

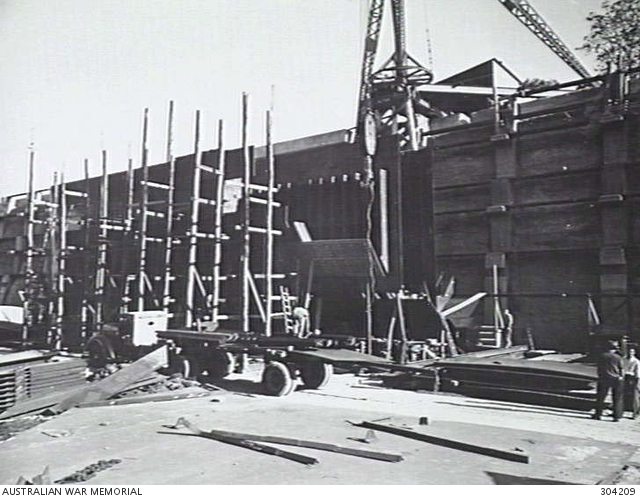
Cairncross Dockyard in 1942

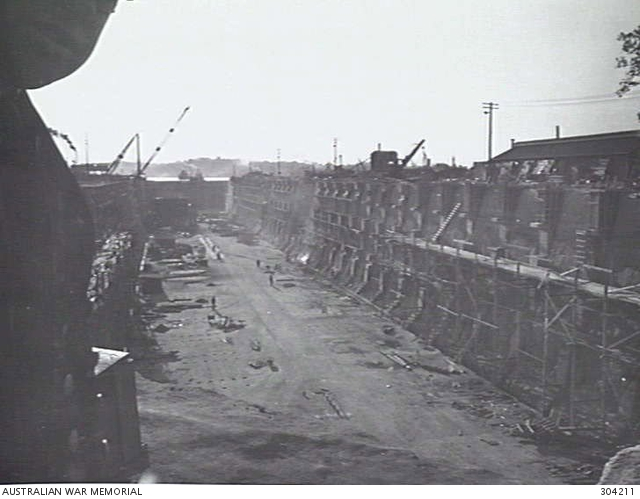
Building Cairncross Dockyard in 1942

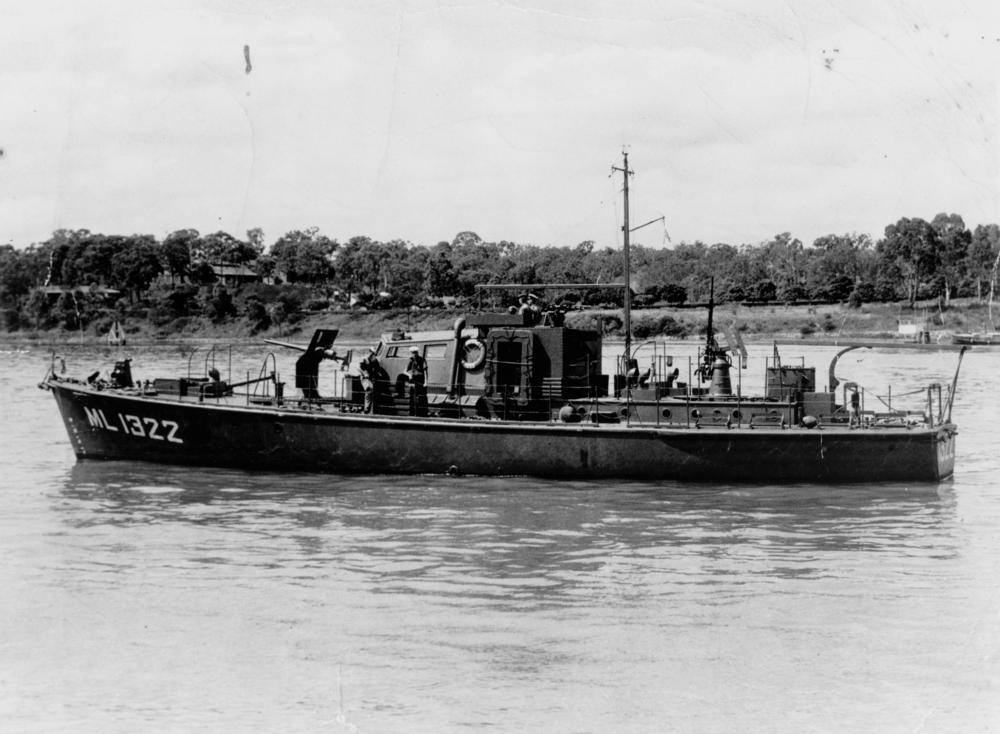
Colmslie Naval Base Brisbane in 1944

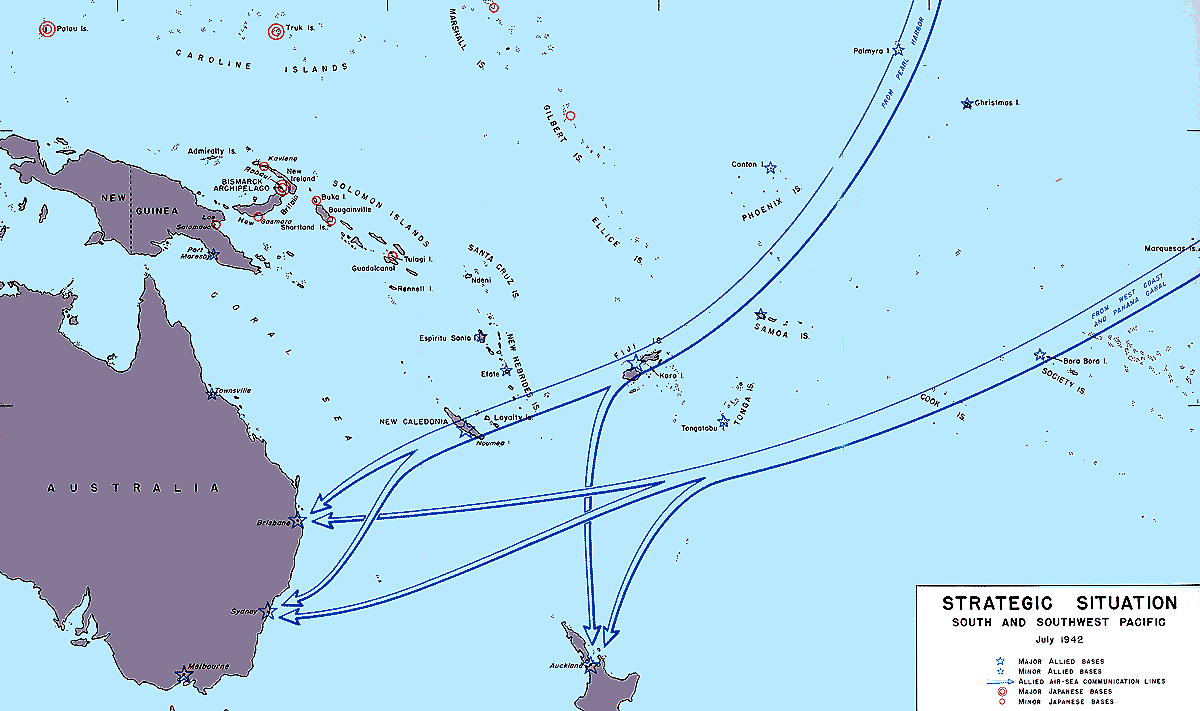
Strategic supply chain situation in South Pacific in July 1942

== See also ==
- Naval Base Melbourne
- Naval Base Adelaide
- Battle of Brisbane
- Axis naval activity in Australian waters
- US Naval Advance Bases
- List of Royal Australian Navy bases
