= Naval Base Hollandia =

World War 2 base in New Guinea

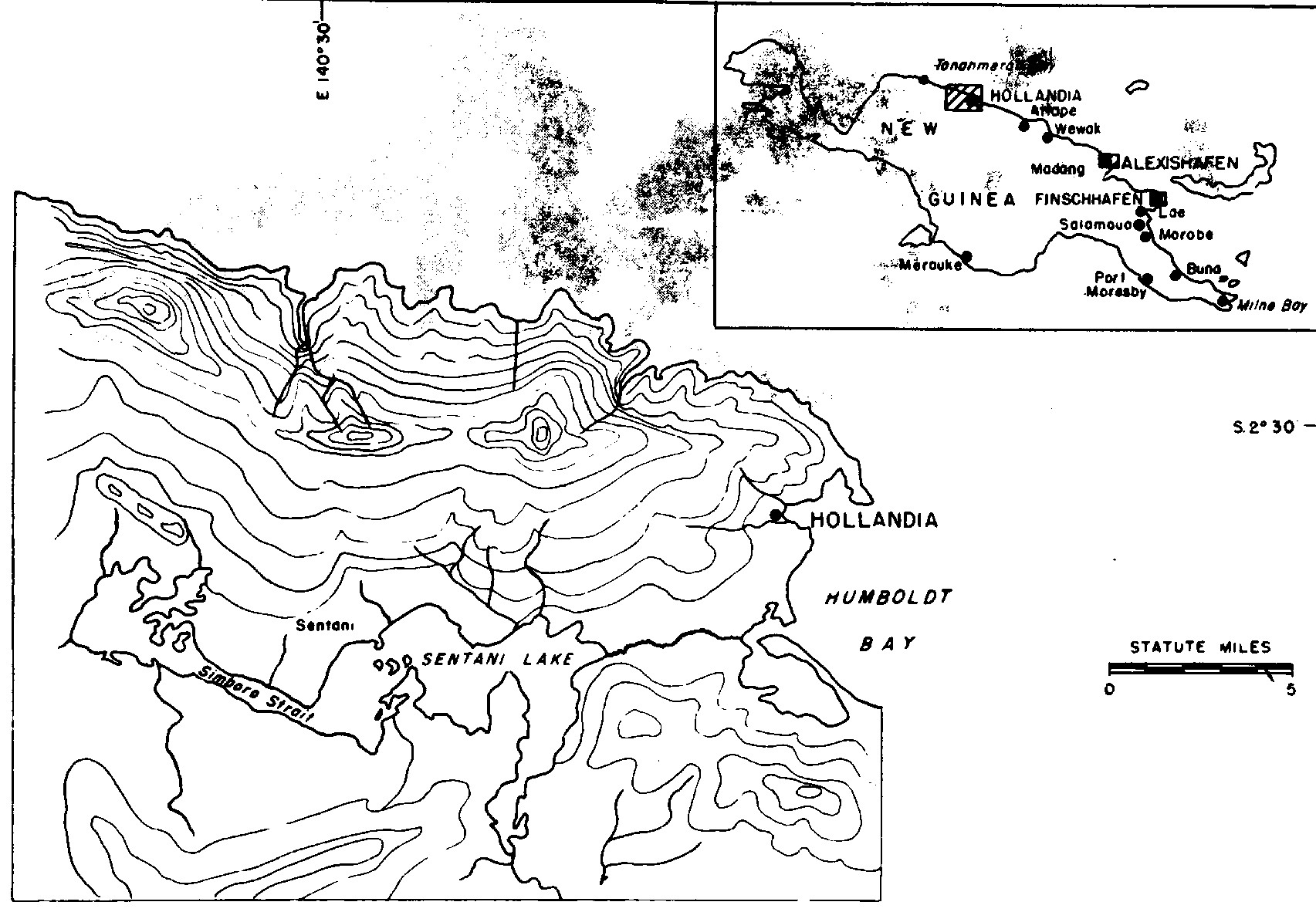
- Map of Hollandia

- Location within Papua

- Location in Western New Guinea and Indonesia
- Coordinates: 2.541432°S 140.707047°E
- Naval Base: United States Navy
- Province: Papua
- Founded: May 9, 1944
- Closed: December 1945
- Time zone: UTC+9 (Indonesia Eastern Time)
- Climate: Af

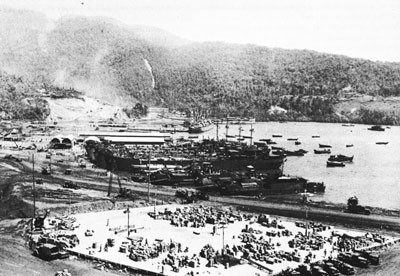
Busy Naval Base Hollandia port in 1945

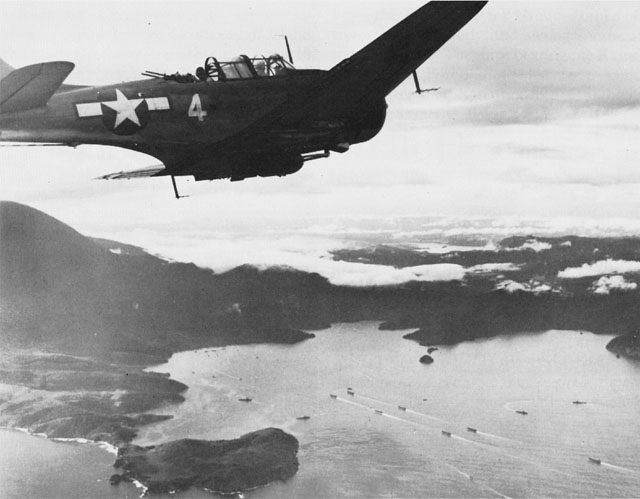
Douglas SBD-5 Dauntless over Naval Base Hollandia's Tanahmerah Bay

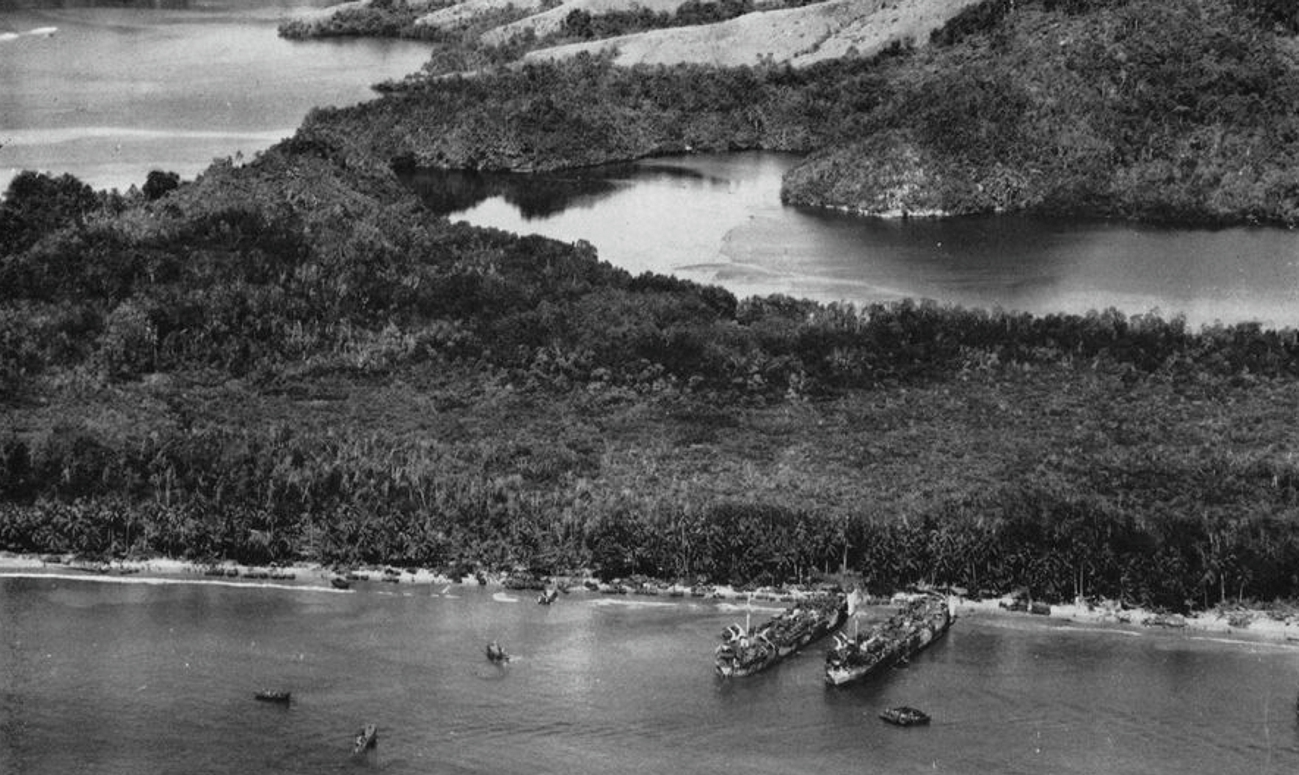
Navy tank landing ships at Hollandia 1944

Naval Base Hollandia was a United States Navy base built during World War II at Humboldt Bay, near the city of Hollandia (now Jayapura) in New Guinea. The base was built by the US Navy Seabees during the Battle of Hollandia, starting on May 9, 1944. Later Naval Base Hollandia became a supply base to support the invasion of the Philippines that started on October 20, 1944. Naval Base Hollandia became an advance headquarter of the United States Seventh Fleet.

== History ==
The Battle of Hollandia started on April 22, 1944, as part of the New Guinea campaign. United States Armed Forces as part of Operation Persecution landed at both Humboldt Bay and Tanahmerah Bay, 12 miles west of Humboldt Bay. Both bays are in a rain Tropical rainforest climate. On May 9, the Seabee 113th Construction Battalion arrived at Humboldt Bay and start construction on the port and docking facilities. Buildings and roads were built at the port base camp. A power station, water purification, Seabee camp and depot were built. To receive all the needed supplies for the new Naval Base a pier for Merchant Navy ships was built and completed on June 9. To prepare for the staging of troops, a second pier was built, starting September 13 and completed on November 23. A destroyer repair base was completed on September 1. Seabee 102rd Construction Battalion arrived at Humboldt Bay on June 12, 1944, to speed up construction projects. To expand the base a major land fill project was done into the bay. Beach landing ramps were built to support the loading and unloading of LST ships. Before the piers were completed the Seabee installed pontoon barge docks. Seabees were sent 25 miles west to Tanahmerah Bay on June 19. At Tanahmerah Bay a large fuel oil and diesel tank farm was built. From Tanahmerah Bay some Seabees were sent 8 miles inland to Lake Sentani and built an advance naval headquarters. Seabee 119th and 122nd Construction Battalion arrived to help with work at Tanahmerah Bay. The 122nd Battalion worked at facilities the Wakde Airfield on an Island west of Humboldt Bay and at Aitape east of Humboldt Bay. Naval Base Hollandia supplied most of the supplies for the invasion of the Philippines. Some of the base was moved to more forward bases by the Naval Construction Maintenance Unit 558. The Naval Base Hollandia was closed in December 1945 and the facilities were sold to the Netherlands East Indies Government.

== Bases and facilities ==
- Harbor administration
- Power station
- Water purification plant
- Seabee Camp
- Seabee Depot
- Supply Depot
- Fleet post office FPO# 3115 SF Hollandia
- PT Boat Base, (serviced by USS Oyster Bay (AGP-6))
- Altape PT Boat Base
- Repair Depot
- Communication center
- G-2 Navl hospital 500-beds
- Destroyer repair base with 350 troops
- Staging camp
- Machine shops
- Engineering camp
- Chemical Engineering Camp
- Degaussing range
- Refrigerator storage
- Crash boat base
- Barracks
- Mess Halls
- Pontoon assembly depot
- Ammunition depot
- Hollandia Airfield near Lake Sentani
- Cyclops Airfield, inland from Hollandia
- Leimok Hill radio station
- Tanahmerah Bay tank farm
- Lake Sentani Base and Airfield
- Wakde Airfield, remote base
- Aitape barracks and Mess hall, PT Boat Base, including PT-370, PT-114, PT-144 and PT-368 (serviced by USS Oyster Bay), remote base
- Cape Soeadja Camp
- Outlying Bases:

Naval Base Hollandia supports nearby small Outlying Bases

- Naval Base Aitape at Aitape, Fleet PO Box was 927
- Naval Base Wewak at Wewak, Fleet PO Box was 3074
- Naval Base Saidor at Saidor, Fleet PO Box was 3086
- Naval Base Saidor Sungum at Saidor, Fleet PO Box was 3088

== Gallery ==
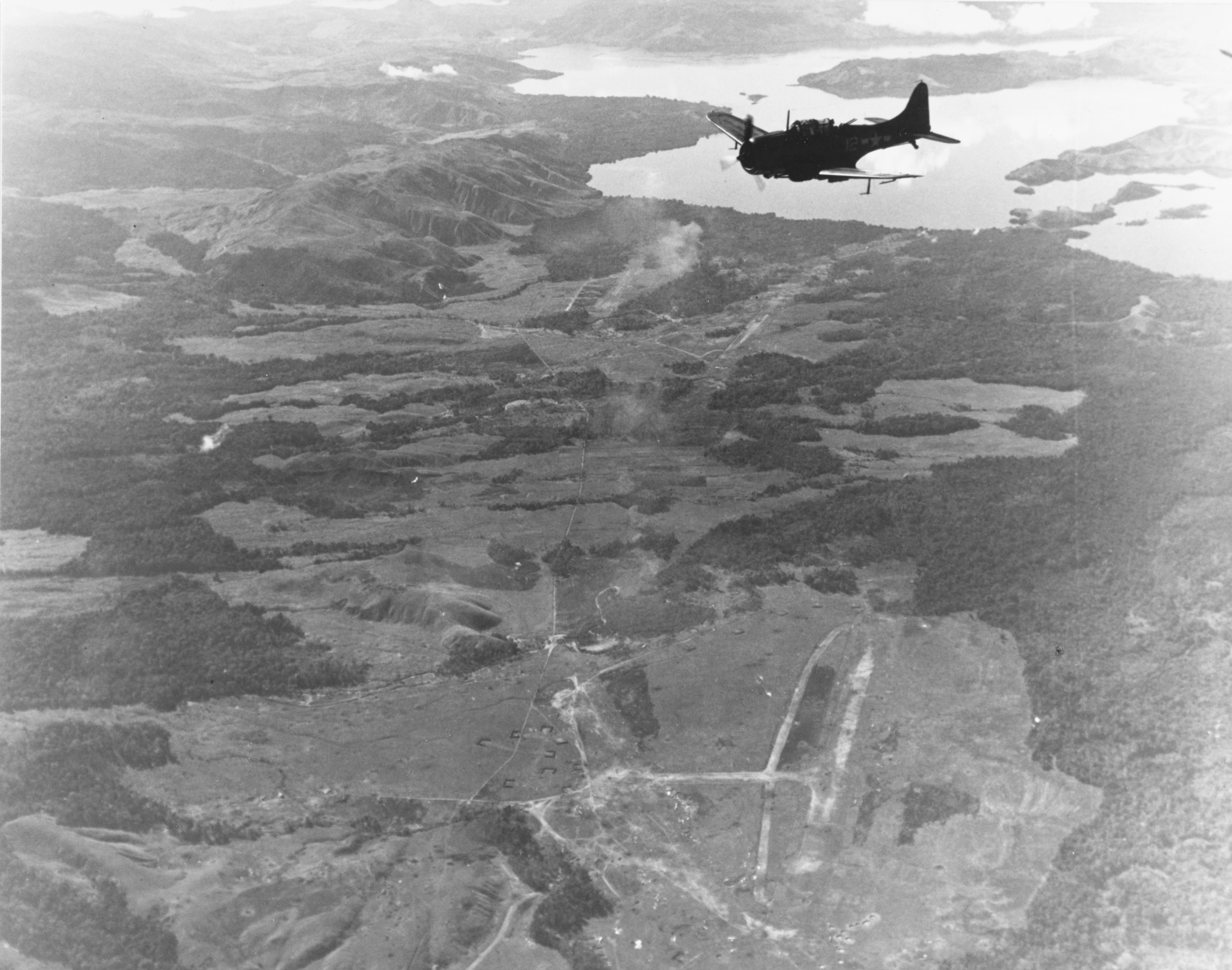
Douglas SBD-5 Dauntless over Hollandia airfield on 21 April 1944

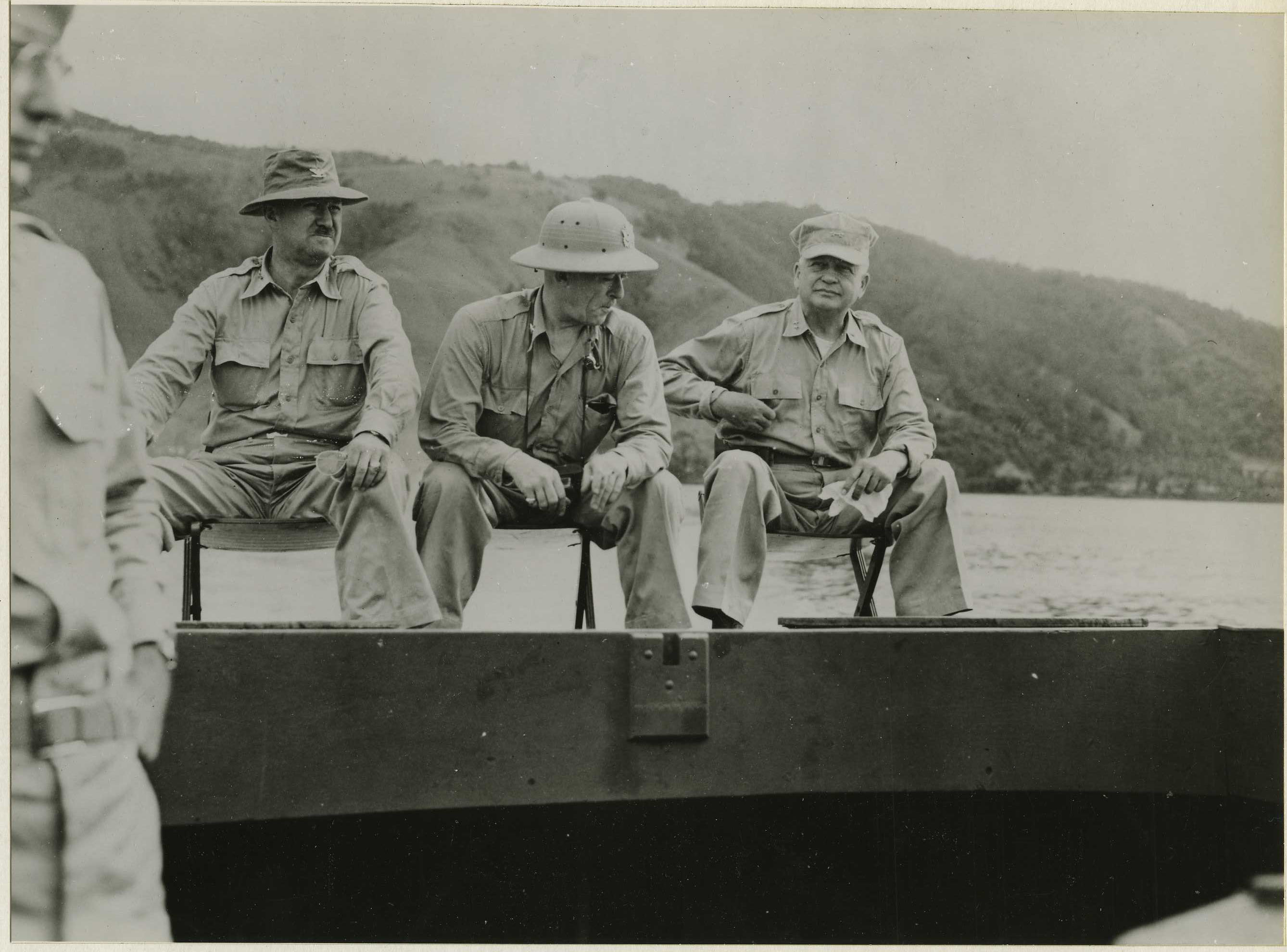
Army Quartermaster General Staff on Seabee dock at Lake Sentani Base

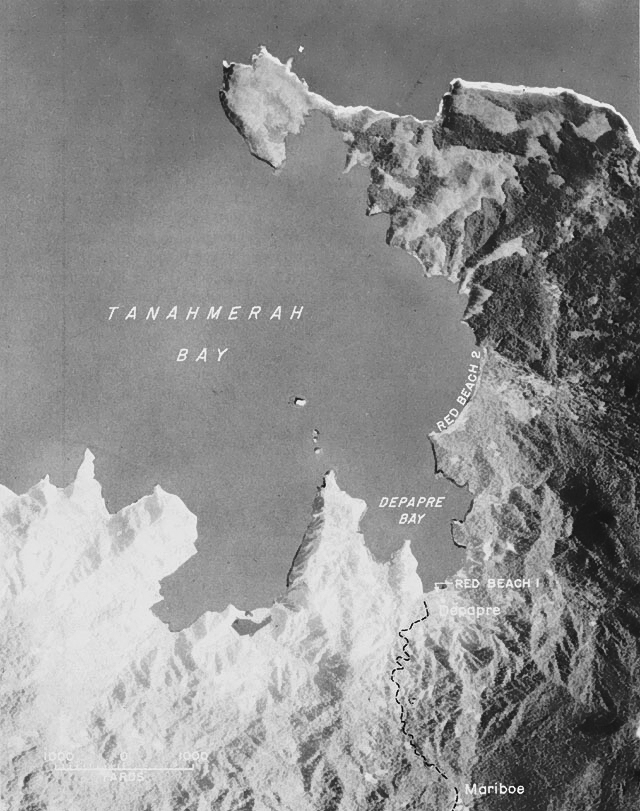
Map of Tanahmerah Bay east of Hollandia Bay

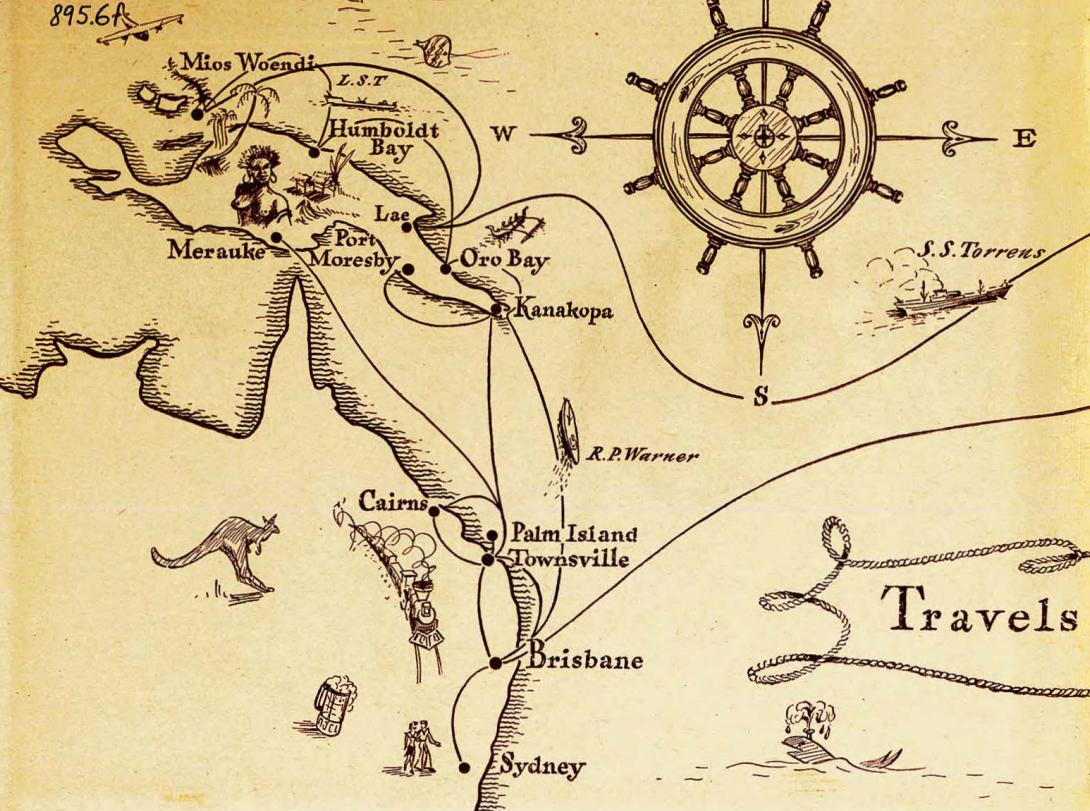
Map Camp Seabee at Naval Base Brisbane building trips

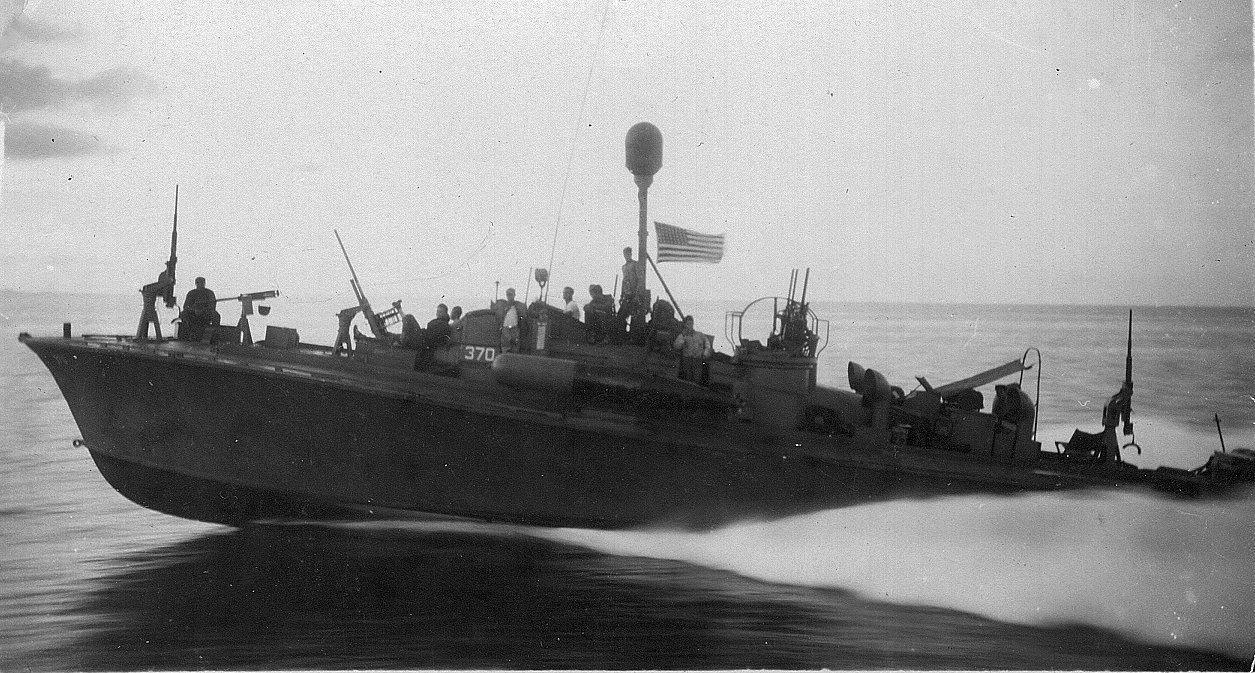
US Navy PT-370 boat in New Guinea in 1944

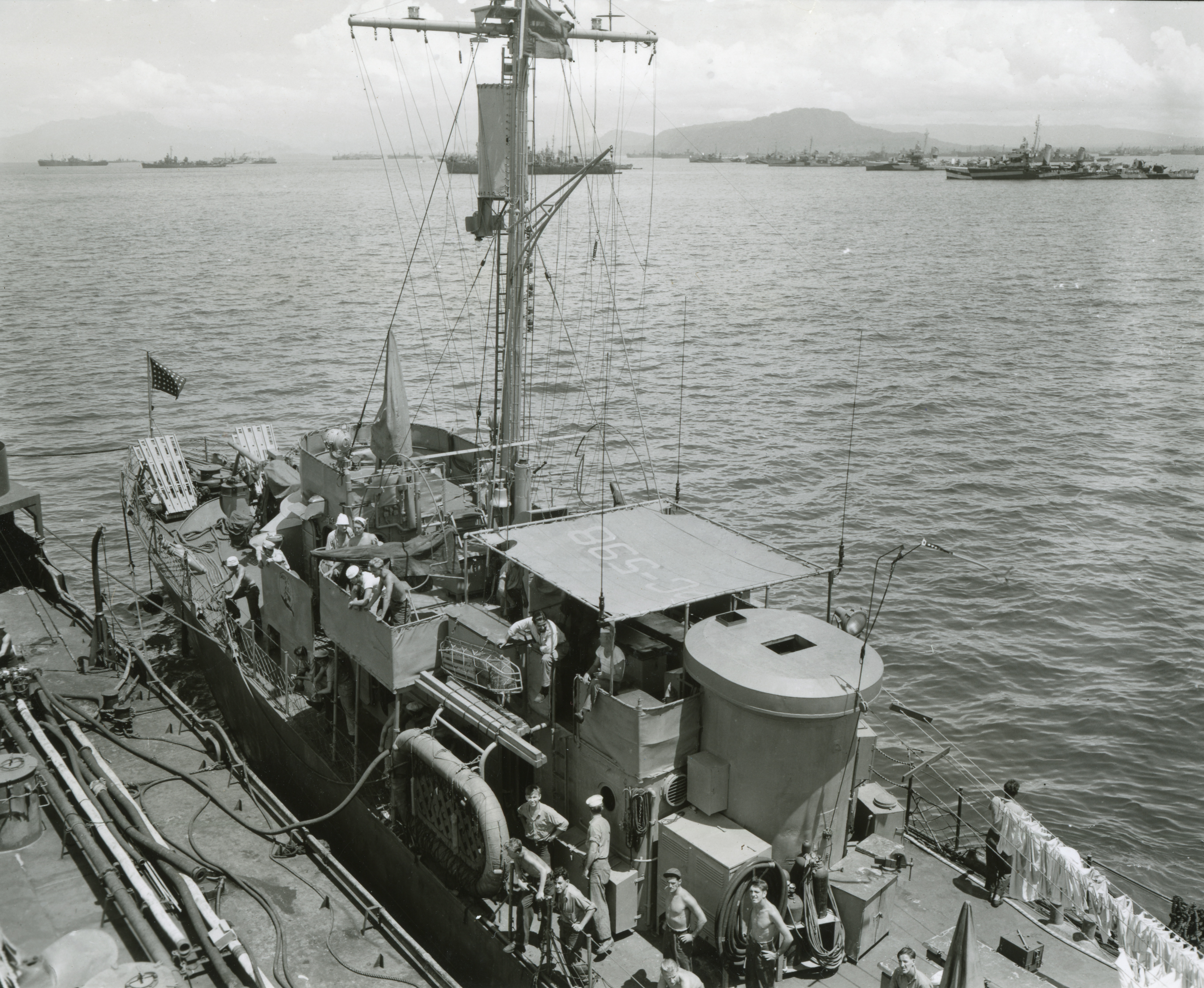
USS PC-598 at Humboldt Bay in October 1944

== See also ==
- US Naval Advance Bases
- Naval Base Port Moresby
- Naval Base Milne Bay
- Naval Base Mios Woendi
- Naval Base Lae
- Naval Base Alexishafen
