= Naval Base Darwin =

Major World War 2 base in Australia

- Darwin, Northern Territory in Australia

Site information
- Type: Naval base
- Operator: United States Navy

Location
- Location in the Northern Territory
- Coordinates: 12.4708°S 130.8483°E

Site history
- Built: 1942
- In use: 1942 – 1945

Naval Base Darwin at Port Darwin
- Interactive map of Naval Base Darwin at Port Darwin
- Location in Australia

Location
- Coordinates: 12.4708°S 130.8483°E

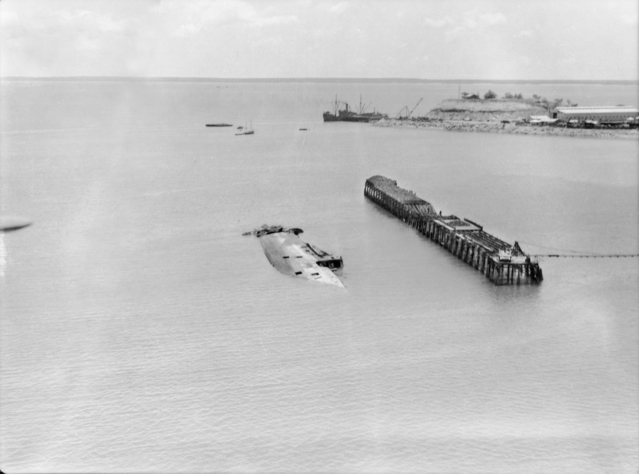
Darwin Harbour with the sunken ship MV Neptuna and burnt-out wharf of Darwin Harbour following the attack on February 19, 1942

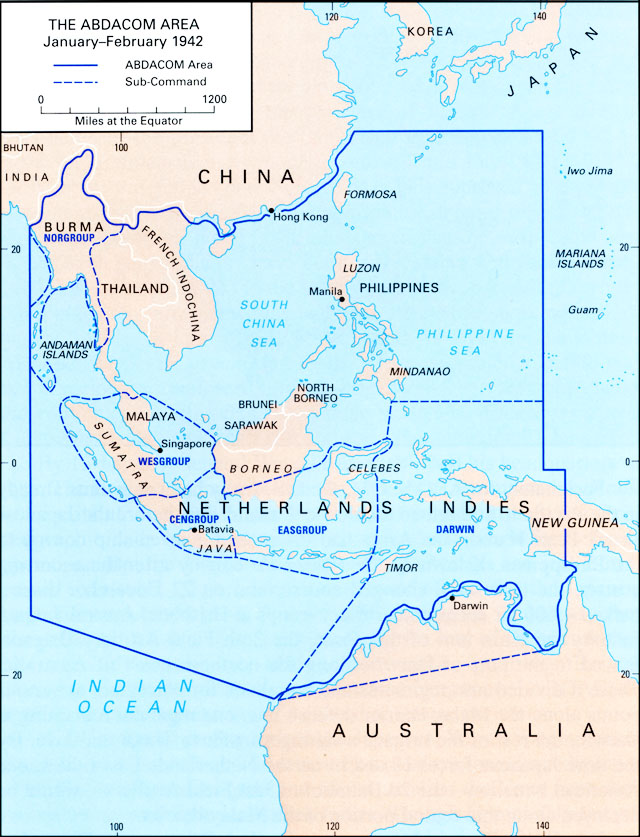
Map of the 1942 American-British-Dutch-Australian Command

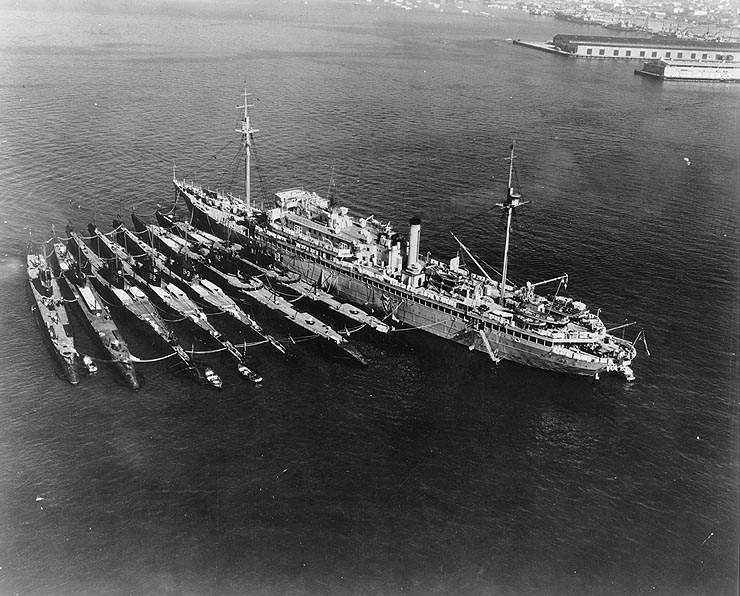
USS Holland with (left to right: Cachalot, Dolphin, Barracuda, Bass, Bonita, Nautilus, Narwhal)

Naval Base Darwin was a United States Navy base built during World War II at Darwin, Northern Territory, Australia. The first US operations at Darwin was Naval mine depot, built to supply Australia with mines to support the Pacific War. As the US Navy expanded in the Island hopping campaign, Naval Base Darwin expanded to include a Port Darwin submarine base, PT boat Bases, and other facilities. US Navy operations started in 1942 and ended after the war in 1945.

== History ==
The US Navy received an Australian government contract to provide Naval mines for the protection of Australian ports and to disrupt Japanese shipping. As such the Navy built a Naval mine depot at the port of Darwin, in Darwin Harbour. Due to Japan's southern advance in the Pacific War into the Southwest Pacific the US Navy also built a submarine base and PT boat Bases on the northwest coast of Australia, to patrol and protect the shipping lanes. The city of Darwin is on a peninsula between Clarence Strait and Frances Bay in the northern coast of Australia. Naval Base Darwin was part of the 1942 American-British-Dutch-Australian Command (ABDACOM). With ABDACOM the Allies tried to limit the advance of Japan. ABDACOM did not have enough troops or supplies to carry out the mission in 1942.

The submarine started with the arrival of the submarine tender USS Otus (ARG-20) worked at the base from December 10, 1941 to January 1942. The submarine tender USS Holland (AS3) arrived on January 2, 1942 and began around the clock service to US submarines. A land submarine repair base with docks and depots was built to support the operations. In February 1943 Holland departed Australia for Mare Island Navy Yard for overhaul. The USS Coucal (ASR-8) worked at the base from August 12, 1943 to October 29, 1944. USS Chanticleer (ASR-7) worked at the base from October 1944 to January 1945.

The USS Black Hawk (AD-9) a destroyer tender operated out of Naval Base Darwin from January 3 to February 1942. USS Langley (CV-1), the US Navy's first aircraft carrier, assisted the Royal Australian Air Force in running anti-submarine patrols out of Darwin from January 1 to 11 1942.

Much of the Darwin submarine base operations was moved to the Fremantle submarine base in Western Australia, as this was out of range of land-based Japanese aircraft. Darwin also had a high tide problem.

In January 1945 US Navy Seabees built a Seabees base camp at Darwin. The other large US Naval Advance Bases in Australia were at Naval Base Brisbane and Naval Base Sydney. The Royal Australian Navy operated bases in Darwin and worked with the US Navy. Royal Australian Navy base around Darwin: HMAS Coonawarra Naval Base, HMAS Melville Naval Base. *After Victory over Japan Day the base closed and the US Navy started taking Troops home in Operation Magic Carpet.

== Bases and facilities ==
- Fleet anchorage in Darwin Harbor - Port Darwin
- Naval mine depot
- Submarine base
- PT boat Bases
- Fleet Post Office FPO# 245 SF Darwin, Northern Territory, Australia (WAIK)
- Tank farm
- Naval Port facilities
- Supply depot
- Fuel depot
- Ammunition depot on Frances Bay
- Seabees camp
- Darwin Harbor Seaplane Base
  - VP-22 US ANvy Patrol Squadron
  - Shared with Royal Australian Air Force

=== Fleet Radio Unit Radio Station ===
Radio station near Adelaide River, 77 miles from Darwin The post was called USN Supplementary Radio Station Adelaide River and U.S. Naval Attachment, Fleet Radio Unit, Navy 136. It was run under the United States Seventh Fleet for the Naval Intelligence Center and opened in March 1943. A teleprinter line was run to Naval Intelligence Center so the info picked up could get to Naval Intelligence Center quickly. A DAB-3 HFDF was installed, a radio Direction Finding System, or Radio Direction Finder (RDF). The site was abandoned after the war. The Fleet Post Office FPO was 179 SF Adelaide River, Australia.

== See also ==
- Bombing of Darwin
- Naval Base Merauke
- US Naval Base Australia
