= Naval Base Sydney =

Major World War 2 base in Australia

Naval Base Sydney Naval Base Hospital Sydney
- Part of United States Seventh Fleet
- Sydney, New South Wales in Australia

Site information
- Type: Naval base
- Operator: United States Navy
- Condition: Closed 1945

Location
- Location in Greater Sydney
- Coordinates: 33.837952°S 150.996095°E

Site history
- Built: 1943
- Built by: Australian civilian contractors.
- In use: 1943-1945

Naval Base Sydney was a United States Navy base built during World War II at Sydney, New South Wales, Australia. The base was built with Australian civilian contractors. As the US Navy expanded in the Island hopping campaign, Naval Base Sydney expanded to include a Naval Base Hospital, repair base and other facilities. US Navy operations started in 1943 and ended after the war in 1945.

== History ==
The base was built with Australian Allied Works Council civilian contractors and rent was paid for under the reverse Lend-Lease act. Work started in the summer of 1943. Rather than build a new ship docking facilities, the existing commercial port facilities were rented at Port Jackson in Sydney Harbour. Contractors built a ship repair base, supply depot, ammunition depot and camp for Troops. In Granville Park, in the neighborhood Merrylands in Sydney, the Navy built a Naval Base Hospital that at its peak could service 500 Troops.

When needed the Navy rented a large drydock the Australian government built in 1943. The drydock was 1094 feet long and 140 feet wide, with a depth of 40 1/2 feet. In July 1944 a team of 90 US Navy Seabees with the 84th Battalion arrived from Naval Base Brisbane to repair the USS Venus. USS Venus was the Merchant Navy Liberty ship SS William Williams, that was charted to Isthmian Steamship Company, that was damaged in a torpedo attack on 2 May 1943, near Suva, Fiji Islands, by the Japanese submarine I-19. She was full of lumber and did not sink. she was towed to Naval Base Sydney for repair and conversion to a Crater-class cargo ship under charter to the US Navy.

The US Navy worked with the Royal Australian Navy, Fleet Base East, that had its own base in Sydney, HMAS Kuttabul Naval Base) at Potts Point, Garden Island Naval Precinct at Garden Island and HMAS Waterhen Naval Base-HMAS Penguin Naval Base) at North Shore.

The other large US Naval Advance Bases in Australia were at Naval Base Brisbane and Naval Base Darwin. By late 1944 parts of Naval Base Sydney began moving to more forward US Naval Advance Bases. The ammunition depot was the late operation to be moved. *After Victory over Japan Day the base closed and the US Navy started taking Troops home in Operation Magic Carpet.

== Bases and facilities ==
- Naval Base Hospital No. 10, Navy 135, 500 beds, at Granville Park, Merrylands at 33.837952°S 150.996095°E
- Temporary Troop camp
- Supply depot
- Ammunition depot, 20 concrete magazines, 25 by 50 feet, and two 30-by-100-foot
- Messhall
- Barracks
- Fleet Post Office FPO# 135 SF Sydney
- Ship -boat repair base
- Drydock - Cockatoo Island Dockyard (Royal Navy, used when needed)
- Outlying bases supported:
  - Canberra Radio Station in the city of Canberra inland, FPO# 18 Canberra
  - US Navy Signal Station Newcastle at Newcastle, New South Wales FPO# 34
  - Port Stephens amphibious landing training, fleet PO Box 82
  - Nowra Naval Torpedo Unit, Post Office FPO# 18

== Rose Bay Seaplane Base ==
Rose Bay Seaplane Base also called Rose Bay Water Airport was at Rose Bay at the eastern end of Sydney Harbor. Was built in the 1930s to support Qantas Empire Airways (QEA). In the war was used Royal Australian Air Force and US Navy.

== See also ==
- Attack on Sydney Harbour
- Axis naval activity in Australian waters
- US Naval Base Australia
- Royal Australian Navy Heritage Centre
