= USS Coucal =

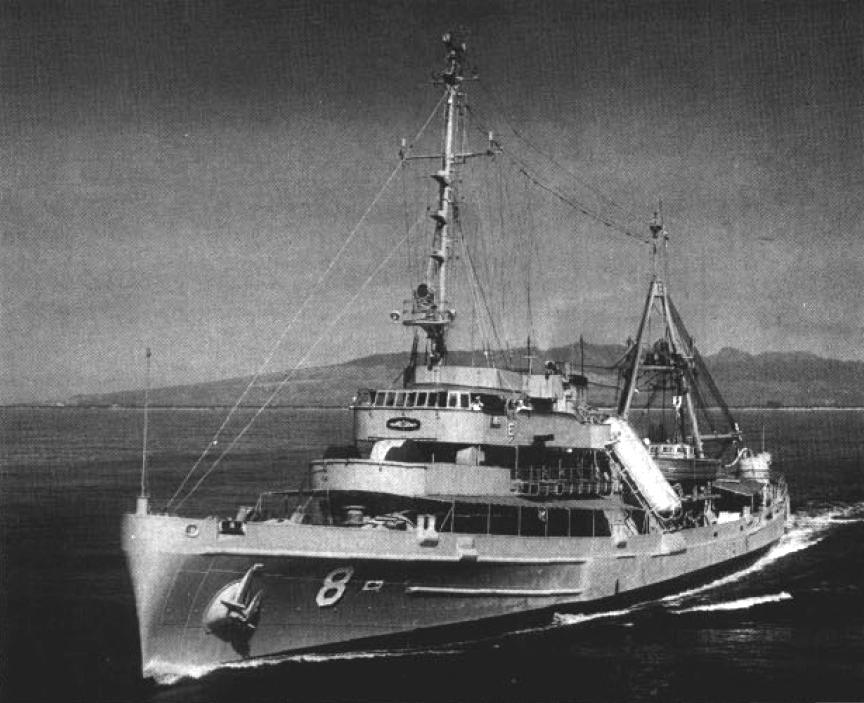
- USS Coucal (ASR-8) underway c1963

History

United States
- Name: USS Coucal
- Builder: Moore Dry Dock Company
- Launched: 29 May 1942
- Commissioned: 22 January 1943
- Stricken: 15 September 1977
- Fate: Sunk as target ship, 16 January 1991

General characteristics
- Class & type: Chanticleer-class submarine rescue ship
- Displacement: 1,780 long tons (1,809 t)
- Length: 251 ft 4 in (76.61 m)
- Beam: 42 ft (13 m)
- Draft: 14 ft 3 in (4.34 m)
- Speed: 16.5 knots (19.0 mph; 30.6 km/h)
- Complement: 108 officers and enlisted
- Armament: 2 × 3"/50 caliber guns

The USS Coucal (ASR-8) was a Chanticleer-class submarine rescue ship in the United States Navy.

== Construction and commissioning ==
Coucal was launched on 29 May 1942 by Moore Shipbuilding and Dry Dock Company in Oakland, California, sponsored by Mrs. D. A. Scott, and was commissioned on 22 January 1943.

== Service history ==
Coucal arrived at Brisbane, Australia, 23 June 1943 to serve the submarines of the 7th Fleet. After 4 October, she gave escort, fueling, and tender services from Milne Bay, New Guinea, and in March 1944, carried cargo to Manus Island and the bombarded Koruniat Island while sailing south to Brisbane for repairs. She returned to Manus 21 April for diving operations, and to set up a rest camp for submariners. On 25 June she sailed for overhaul at Brisbane, and on 12 August arrived at Darwin, Australia to serve submarines once more.

Between 29 October 1944 and 29 December, Coucal joined in convoy exercises with submarines out of Fremantle, returning to duty at Darwin. Between 10 February 1945 and 3 June, she continued her tender service at Exmouth Gulf, then loaded cargo and passengers at Fremantle for the submarine base at Subic Bay, Philippines where she arrived 4 July. Aside from the period between 23 July and 18 August when she escorted British submarines to Borneo, Coucal served at Subic Bay until clearing for Okinawa on 14 September. She was ordered on to Sasebo, where she served on occupation duty until returning to San Francisco 24 November.

Assigned to Operation "Crossroads", the atomic weapons tests in the Marshalls, Coucal put out from San Francisco 25 February 1946 for Pearl Harbor. From 13 April to 30 September she planted moorings at Bikini, and carried out a variety of diving assignments in the tests, then returned to San Francisco for overhaul. From her home port at Pearl Harbor, she sailed to conduct diving and salvage operations on sunken targets at Bikini in the summer of 1947, then operated in the Hawaiian Islands until 12 April 1948, when she sailed westward for the Suez Canal, and İzmir, Turkey. Here she trained men of the Turkish Navy in submarine rescue, salvage, and deep sea diving techniques, and continuing west to round the world, returned to Pearl Harbor 8 January 1949.

Serving Submarine Force, Pacific Fleet, Coucal operated in the Hawaiian Islands training deep sea divers, and carrying out rescue and salvage missions, and serving in the Far East in 1951, 1952–53, 1954–55, 1956–57, 1958, and 1960. Her base in the western Pacific was Yokosuka, Japan, from which she cruised to the Korean coast, Hong Kong, the Philippines, and Okinawa on salvage and rescue duty.

From September 1976 to September 1977, Coucal operated from her home port at Pearl Harbor, mainly supporting submarine training. One break in that routing was towing a barge to Johnson Island. On 15 September 1977, Coucal was decommissioned at Pearl Harbor. In April 1990, ex-Coucal was sunk in the first PACFLT test of a Tomahawk anti-ship missile, fired from USS Chancellorsville (CG-62)
