= Naval Base Samoa =

Naval base in United States

- Location of Naval Base Samoa in Samoa, United States Navy; 1940 to 1951

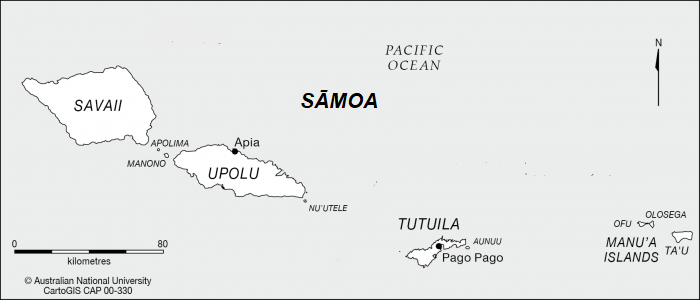
- Map of Samoa
- Time zone: UTC+13^{c} (WST)

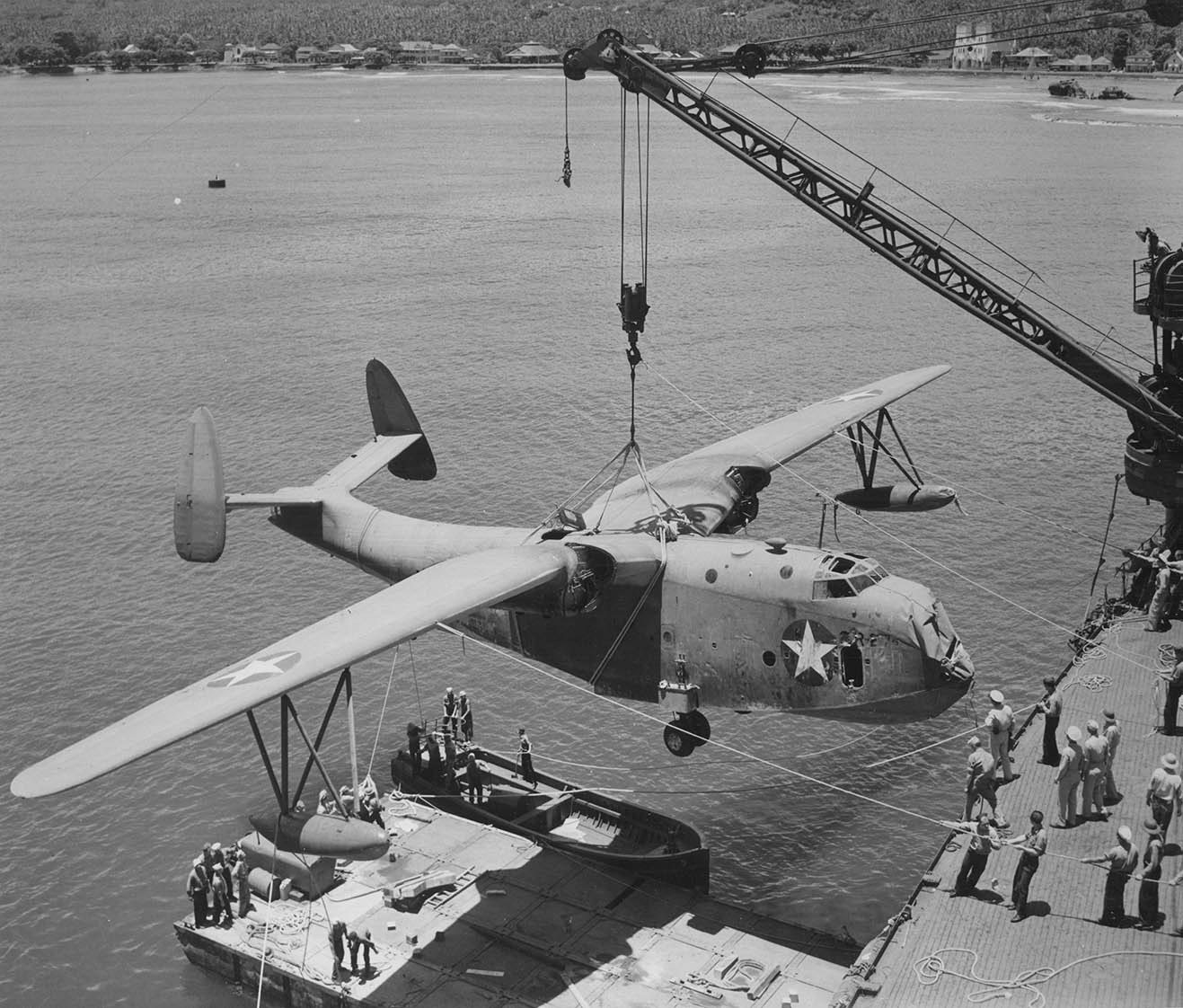
A Martin PBM Mariner plane is loaded on USS Chandeleur (AV-10)'s aft deck in Apia Harbor, Samoa, 15 February 1943. The nose of the plane had been damaged during a take off attempt due to wind and high sea.

Naval Base Samoa, codename Operation Straw, was a number of United States Navy bases at American Samoa in the central Pacific Ocean. The bases were used during World War II to support the island hopping Pacific War efforts of the allied nations fighting the Empire of Japan.

== History ==
=== 1940 national defense program ===
Before the war, the Navy used Pago Pago harbor as a fueling station and a communication center. The center was part of the 1940 national defense program. In 1940 the center had a 300-foot wharf, a radio station, barracked, headquarters, shops, and motor pool, a power plant, water plant. On 1 July 1940 a Pacific Naval Air Bases contract was signed to improve the base at Samoa. The contract was for new fuel-oil, diesel, and gasoline tank farms. Also expansion of the station, an airbase, a dispensary, net depot, a new radio station, gun emplacements, bomb shelters, and ammunition depot. When Charles F. B. Price arrived he took over overseeing the construction started by civilian labor.

=== 1942 formation ===
The bases were in the Samoan Islands, the Samoan islands are divided in half at the International Date Line. The east half are the American Samoa islands and to the west are the Western Samoa part of British Samoa during the war. In 1942 the US Navy used American Samoa as a staging base for upcoming missions in the south pacific. Lieutenant General of the United States Marine Corps, Charles F. B. Price, arrived on 28 April 1942 and set up this Pacific war command at the city of Pago Pago. In the early part of the Pacific war on 11 January 1942, Pago Pago was shelled by a Japanese submarine I-20.

=== 1942 – 1943 construction ===
US Navy Seabee 7th Construction Battalion arrived in July 1942 and worked was shifted from contractors to Seabees. The Seabee 11th Battalion arrived late in August 1942 and took over the work. The Seabee 5th Construction Detachment arrived in April 1943 to help complete all the projects. The Construction Battalion Maintenance Unit (CBMU) 506 arrived in May 1943 and the 11th Battalion departed for Naval Base New Caledonia.

=== Use in 1944 and 1945 ===
As the Pacific war moved east towards Japan, much of Naval Base Samoa was created and moved to US Naval Bases to the east in 1944. By 1945, Samoa remained a refueling station, emergency seaplane base, weather station, and communications center. Most of the bases were closed after the war.

=== 1951 closure ===
The station at Tutuila was the last base closed in 1951.

== Major bases ==
- United States Naval Station Tutuila, Fleet Post Office (FPO) #129 at Pago Pago Harbor, depot, repair (1921–1951)
  - Tafuna Airfield, used by the USN and USMC in the war, now Pago Pago International Airport, opened 6 April 1942
  - 300-bed Naval Mobile Hospital 3
  - Destroyer repair base
  - Leone Airfield, emergency bomber 6,000-foot runway built in 1943 at 14.343°S 170.785°W
- Naval Base Upolu at Upolu Island, advanced Base (1942–1944) FPO#129
  - Upolu Seaplane Base
  - Faleolo Airbase
- Palmyra Island Naval Air Station, advanced Base (1939–1947)
- Naval Base Funafuti , Funafuti, Ellice Islands - Advanced base - Air Base, anchorage and small hospital

== Minor bases ==
- Naval Base at Uea on Wallis Island, a French Protectorate, the most west of the Samoa Islands. FPO# 207, US Navy set up a Landing Craft repair Base on the island's Mata Utu Harbor, also a fuel tank farm.
- Naval Base at Savaii Island, main Samoa Island. FPO# 209, Marines arrived 30 May 1942 and set up a temp tent camp, codenamed Strawmanand later renamed Trap and then Lapover.
- Blunts Point Battery built in 1940

== Stations ==
- Base at Ofu-Olosega, Radio Station, FPO# 67
- Base at Swains Island, Radio Station, FPO# 68
- Base at Tau Islands, Radio Station, FPO# 60
- Base at Vaitogi, radio direction finder Station, FPO# 70
- On Atafu Island, in the Tokelau Islands, to the north of Samoa, the United States Coast Guard built and operated a LORAN station from 1944 to 1946.
- On Gardner Island, in the Phoenix Islands, to the north of Samoa, the United States Coast Guard built and operated a LORAN station from 1944 to 1946.

== Supported airfields ==
Naval Base Samoa and Naval Base Fiji supported three airfields to the north:

- Naval Base to support Nanumea Airfield at Nanumea, Ellice Islands, closed 1945
- Naval Base to support Nukufetau Airfield at Nukufetau, Ellice Islands, closed 1945
- Naval Base Canton Island to support Airfield in the Phoenix Islands, closed 1945
- To the east, Cook Islands:
- Robinson (Omoka) Field, Camp Durant and Naval Seaplan Base Penrhyn on Penrhyn Island
- Amuri Field, Aitutaki Island, Aitutaki Station Naval Hospital

== Seabees ==
Seabees had the men and equipment to build airfields and sea bases. At the base, Seabees built a camp for the crews and a depot for the supplies they need for the project. Seabees often worked in shifts around the clock to open airfields as quickly as possible. Once a project was completed they move to the next project.

== Post war ==
- The Museum of Samoa at Apia.

== Gallery ==
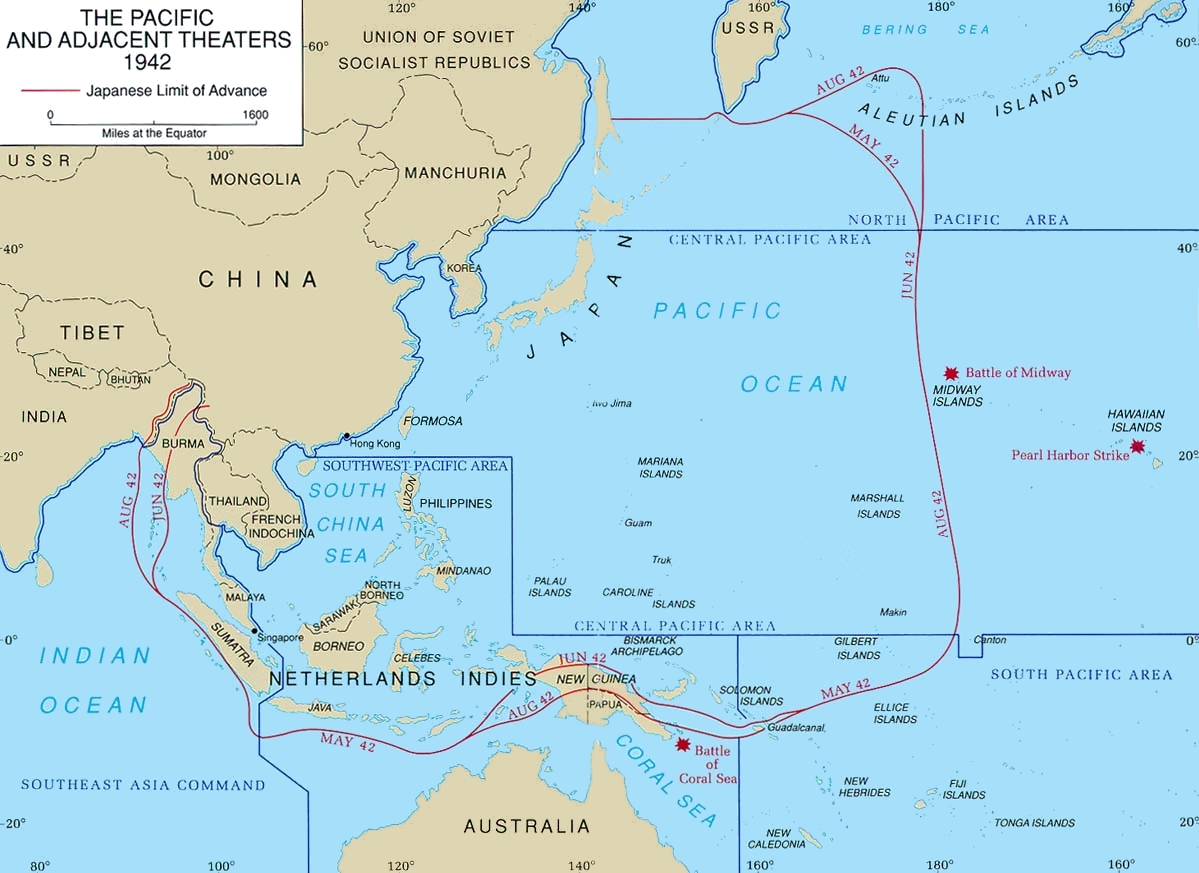
Pacific War Theater Areas map 1942

Wallis, Futuna, Samoa, Tonga, Niue, Fidji islands

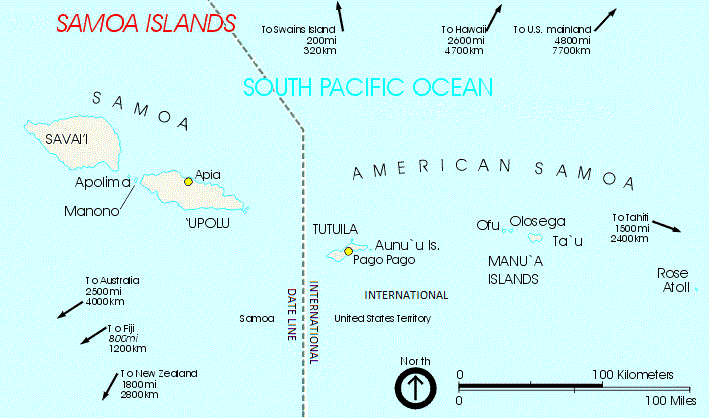
Samoa islands

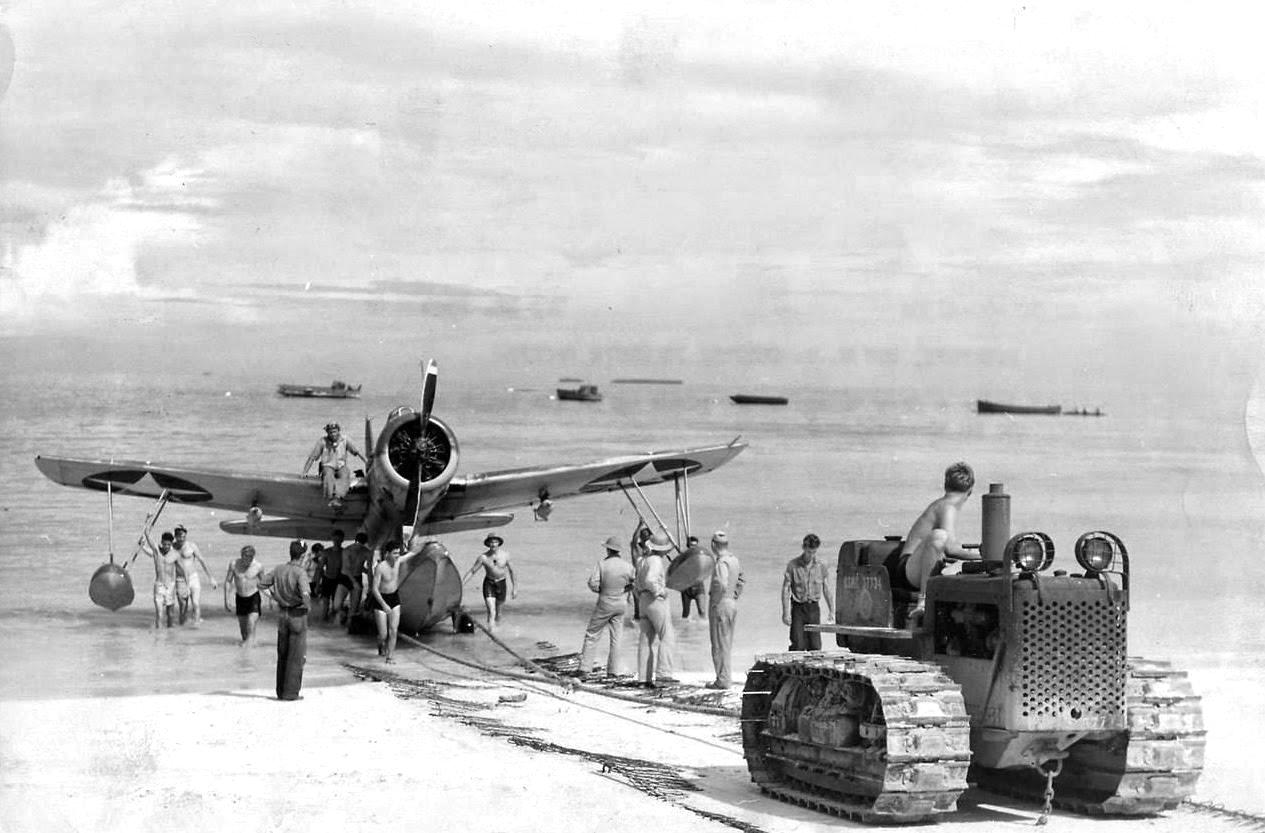
US Navy Marine tractor pulls Vought OS2U Kingfisher on Funafuti Beach in 1943 at Naval Base Funafuti

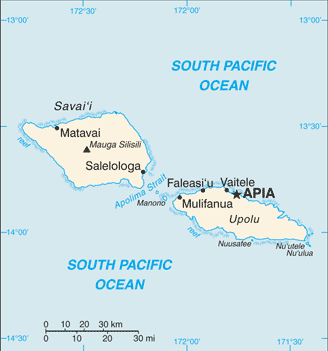
Samoa map

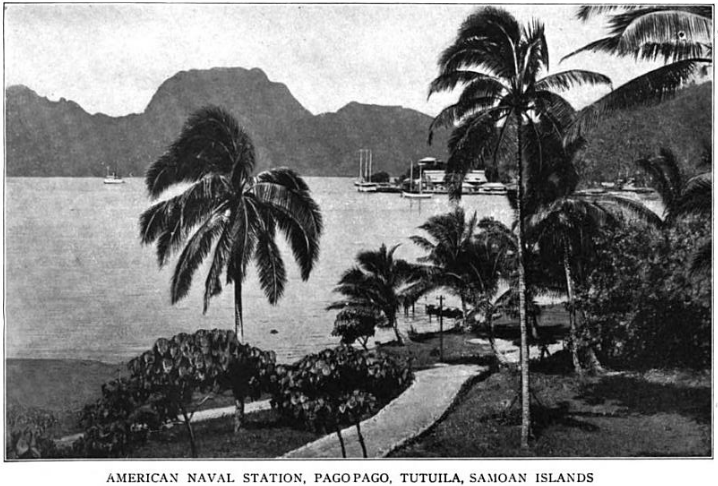
American Naval Base, Samoan Islands

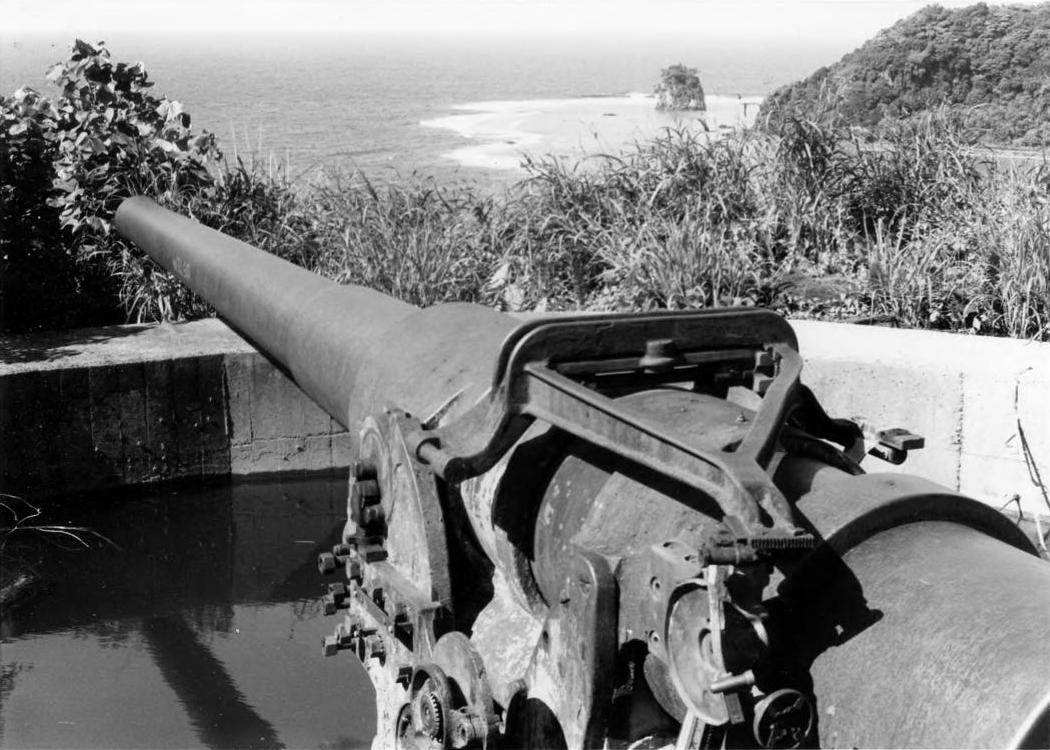
Blunts Point Battery

Wallis Island 1943 US Navy film

Landing Craft Repair Base, Wallis Island, 1943.ogv

Samoa Map

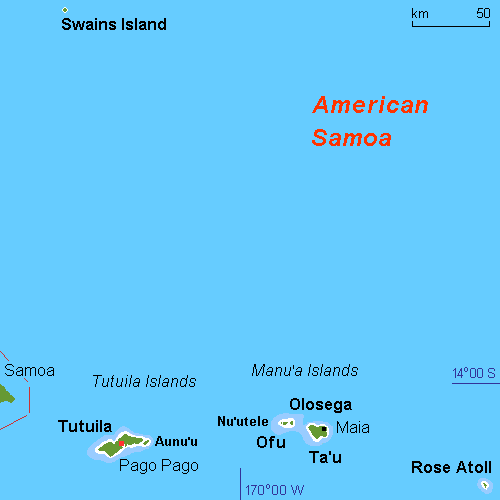
American Samoa

South Pacific islands in 1945

== See also ==
- Media related to Upolu at Wikimedia Commons
- US Naval Advance Bases
- List of governors of American Samoa
- National Register of Historic Places listings in American Samoa
- Naval Base Panama Canal Zone
