= Naval Base Upolu =

Naval base in United States

- Location of Naval Base Upolu in Samoa, United States Navy; 1940 to 1944

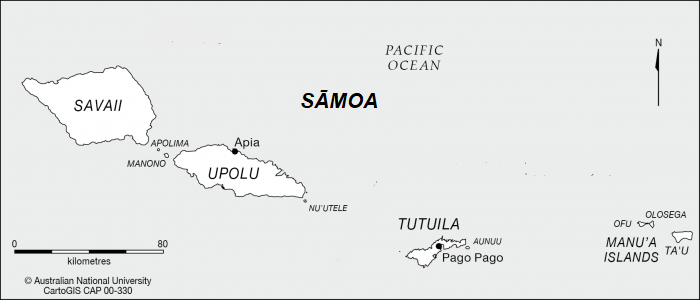
- Map of Samoa
- Capital: Apia; 13°50′00″S 171°45′44″W
- Time zone: UTC+13^{c} (WST)

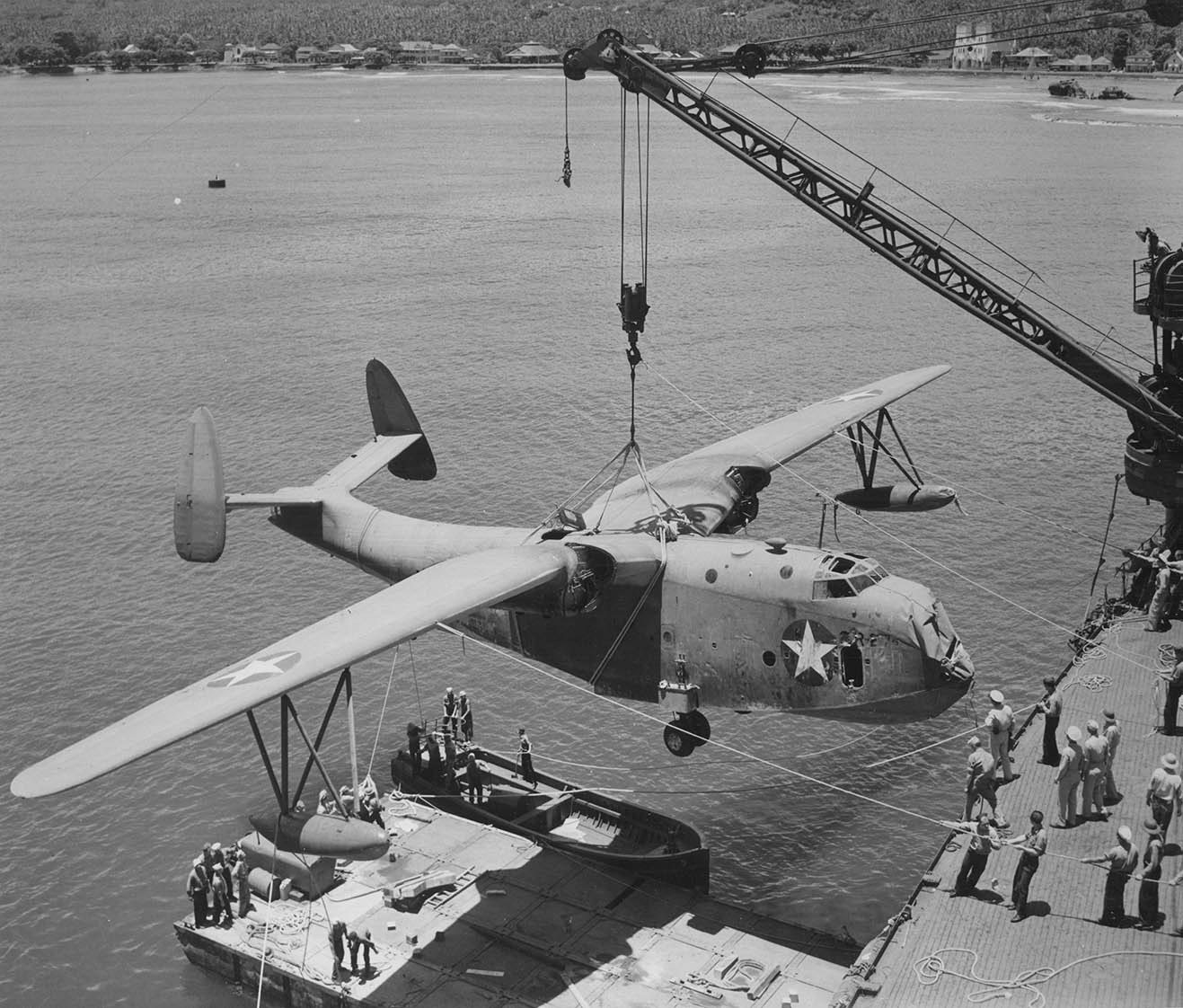
A Martin PBM Mariner plane is loaded on USS Chandeleur (AV-10)'s aft deck in Apia Harbor, Samoa, 15 February 1943. The nose of the plane had been damaged during a take off attempt due to wind and high sea.

Secretary of the Navy Frank Knox, right, and Admiral Chester W. Nimitz, Commander-in-Chief Pacific, center, talks with a Navy officer while inspecting US defenses at Upolu Island, Samoa, in January 1943.

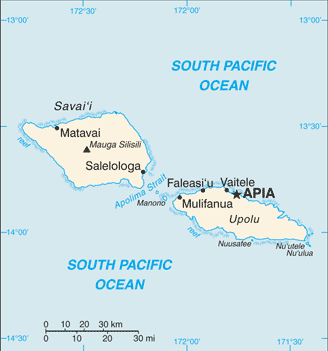
Samoa map

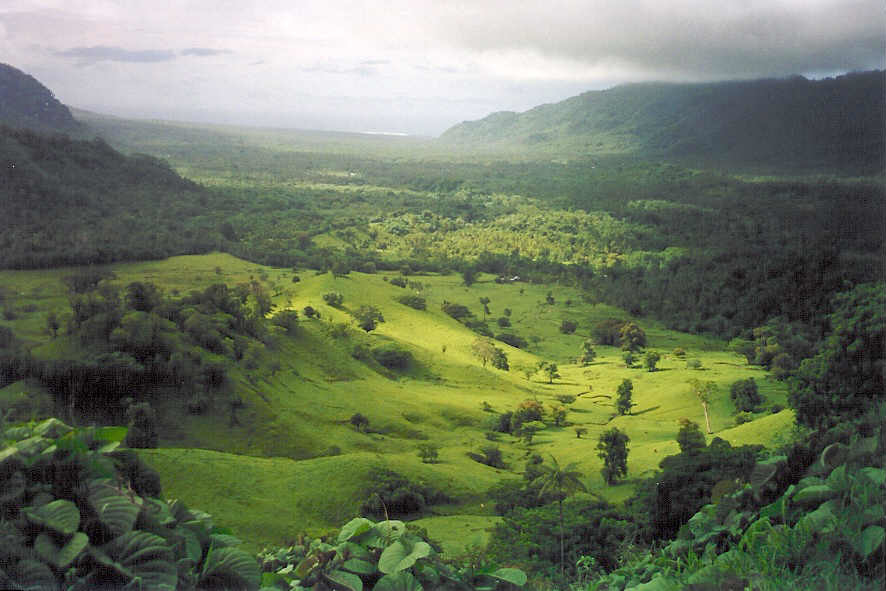
Samoa Upolu

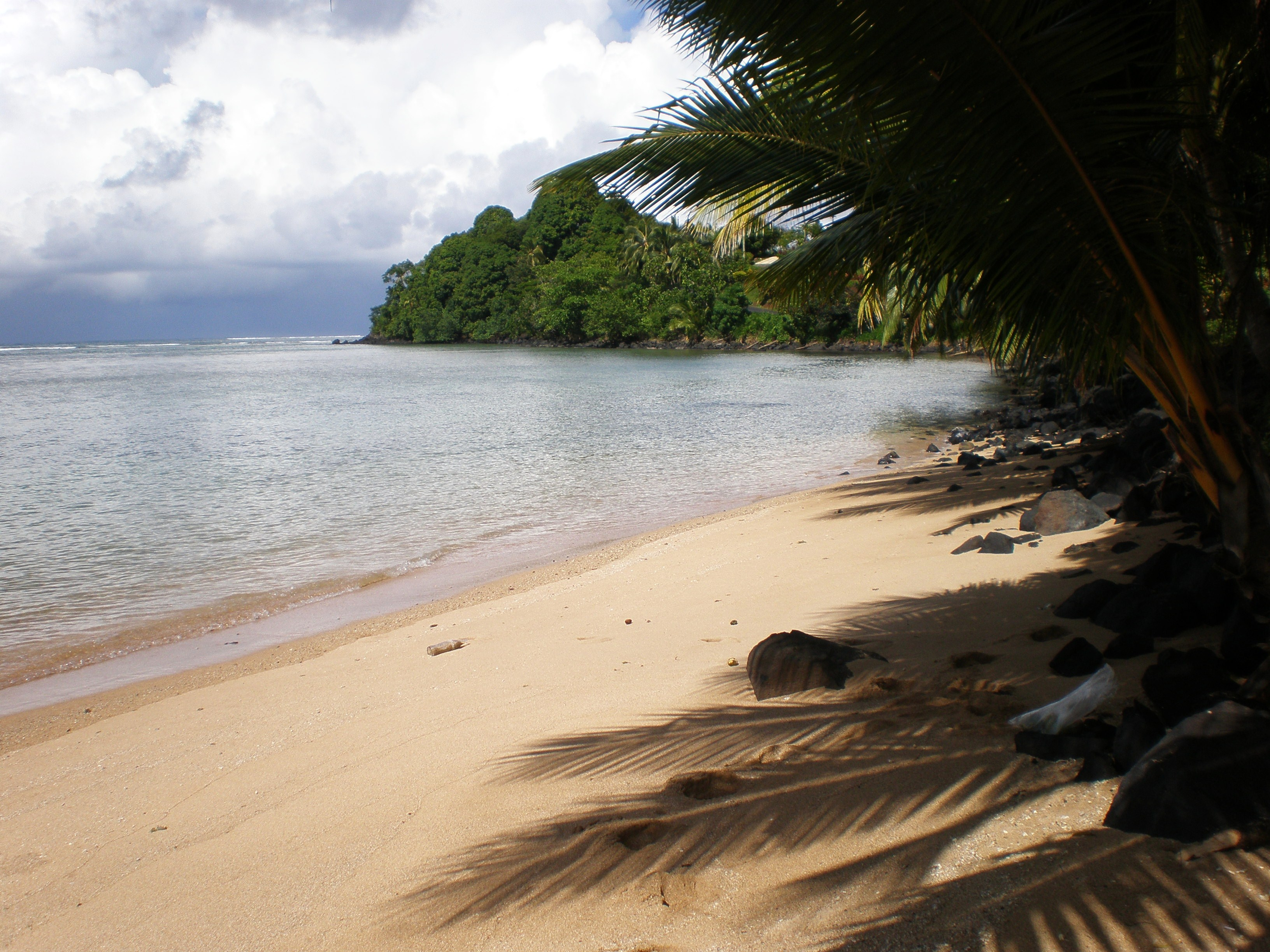
Upolu Island Beach

Naval Base Upolu was a naval base built by the United States Navy in 1942 to support the World War II effort. The base was located on Upolu Island, Samoa in the Western Pacific Ocean, part of the Samoan Islands's Naval Base Samoa. After the surprise attack on Naval Station Pearl Harbor on December 7, 1941, the US Navy was in need of setting up more advance bases in the Pacific Ocean. At Naval Base Upolu the Navy built a sea port, an airbase and a seaplane base.

After the World War II's Pacific War the airstrip was converted to civilian use. Today it is the Faleolo International Airport.

== History ==
Upolu Island, a Polynesia island, is 708 miles (1,139 km) east of Fiji, 2,400 miles (3,900 km) to the north-east of Sydney, and 2,300 miles (3,700 km) south of Hawaii, giving it a key location for both ships and planes to refuel. The US Navy was tasked with building both harbor facilities and an airbase on Upolu. The first to arrive was the 7th Marine Defense Battalion on April 1, 1942. On May 10 the US Navy landed 4th Construction Detachment and work began. The existing pier and seawall were not able to handle the upcoming needs. The Navy build a floating dock with 3-by-7-pontoon barges to begin unloading cargo. Type B ship barges and native scow barges were used also. Existing buildings became temporary warehouses, offices, and a dispensary. Tents were set up for hospital wards, mess hall, and quarters. The base became part of Naval Base Samoa.

The Navy built a 4,000-foot (1,200 m) by 200-foot (61 m) runway on Upolu at Faleolo, an auxiliary field. After removing coconut palms, the runway was paved with crushed and rolled volcanic ash on a lava rock base. The runway was found to be able to support heavy bombers. The runway was operational by July 1942. U.S. Marine Fighting Squadron VMF-111 operated from the Faleolo auxiliary field. In March 1943 the US Navy Seabees lengthened the runway to 6,000 feet (1,800 m) and widen it to 300 feet (91 m), now the Faleolo International Airport. The Seabees also installed taxiways and parking for 58 planes. Also at the airbase, they built two hangars, quonset hut shops, and quonset hut housing.

In May 1942 a seaplane base was built by the Seabees began. Five 30-foot (9.1 m) seaplane ramps were built of rock fill and a concrete surface was installed. In the port, six mooring buoys and one nose hangar were built. The seaplane base had storage, a workshop, barracks, and a refueling station. Two anti-aircraft artillery battalions camps were built for protection. US Navy Sea Navy Scout Squadron VS-51 operated out of Naval Base Upolu. VS-51 operated Vought OS2U Kingfisher and Grumman J2F Duck planes under Fleet Air Wing Two. The USS Chandeleur (AV-10), a seaplane tender was stationed at Apia Harbor, to service the planes.

Seabees built a 108-bed hospital, operating room, and a dental office at the base. Also added to the base, Seabees built a new 600-foot (180 m)-by-20-foot (6.1 m) wharf with lave rock and concrete road on top. A short distance from the base ammunition storage magazines were built. Construction Seabees depart May 20, 1943, as Construction Battalion Maintenance Unit, CBMU 506. Construction Battalion Maintenance took over the operations of a sawmill and constructed carpenter, plumbing, and sheet-metal shops. CBMU 504 arrived on February 16, 1944, and took over the operations, with CBMU 506 departed on February 27, 1944, for work at Tulagi. The US Navy did beach landing training at Upolu, the SS American Legion and other ships did the training 1943. Closure of the base started in February 1944 and was completed by November 1944, with the base moved to move forward location, closer to the fighting action.

Upolu Island is a tropical forest, that is 47 miles (76 km) long and 437 square miles (1,130 km^{2}). The Island is made from an ancient basaltic shield volcano. Upolu had two ports Apia and Sava, both did not have good natural fleet anchorage. The city of Apia is on the north coast with the small Apia Harbour.

== Operation Straw ==
Operation Straw was the code name for the bases built in the geographical location of Samoa's Upolu Island and Tutuila Island.

- Upolu island was codenamed Strawhat and later renamed Hour.
- Savaii Island was codenamed Strawmanand later renamed Trap and then Lapover. Marines arrived on May 30, 1942. No buildings were built on Savaii.
- Wallis island also became protected by US forces in January 1942.
- Tutuila is the second-smallest inhabited island of the Samoan archipelago, a base was built on Tutuila also. Base construction on Tutuila started in 1940, before the war started. On Tutuila the Navy built, Naval Base Tutuila, also called Naval Station Tutuila. Tutuila excellent fleet anchorage at Pago Pago Harbor.

== Seabees ==
Seabees units that worked at Upolu:

- 141st Battalion
- 93rd, 2bd Battalion
- NMCB 62
- CBMU 504
- CBMU 506

== See also ==
- Media related to Upolu at Wikimedia Commons
- US Naval Advance Bases
- List of governors of American Samoa
- National Register of Historic Places listings in American Samoa
