= Government House (American Samoa) =

Building in Pago Pago, American Samoa

- U.S. National Register of Historic Places
- U.S. National Historic Landmark
- U.S. Historic district – Contributing property
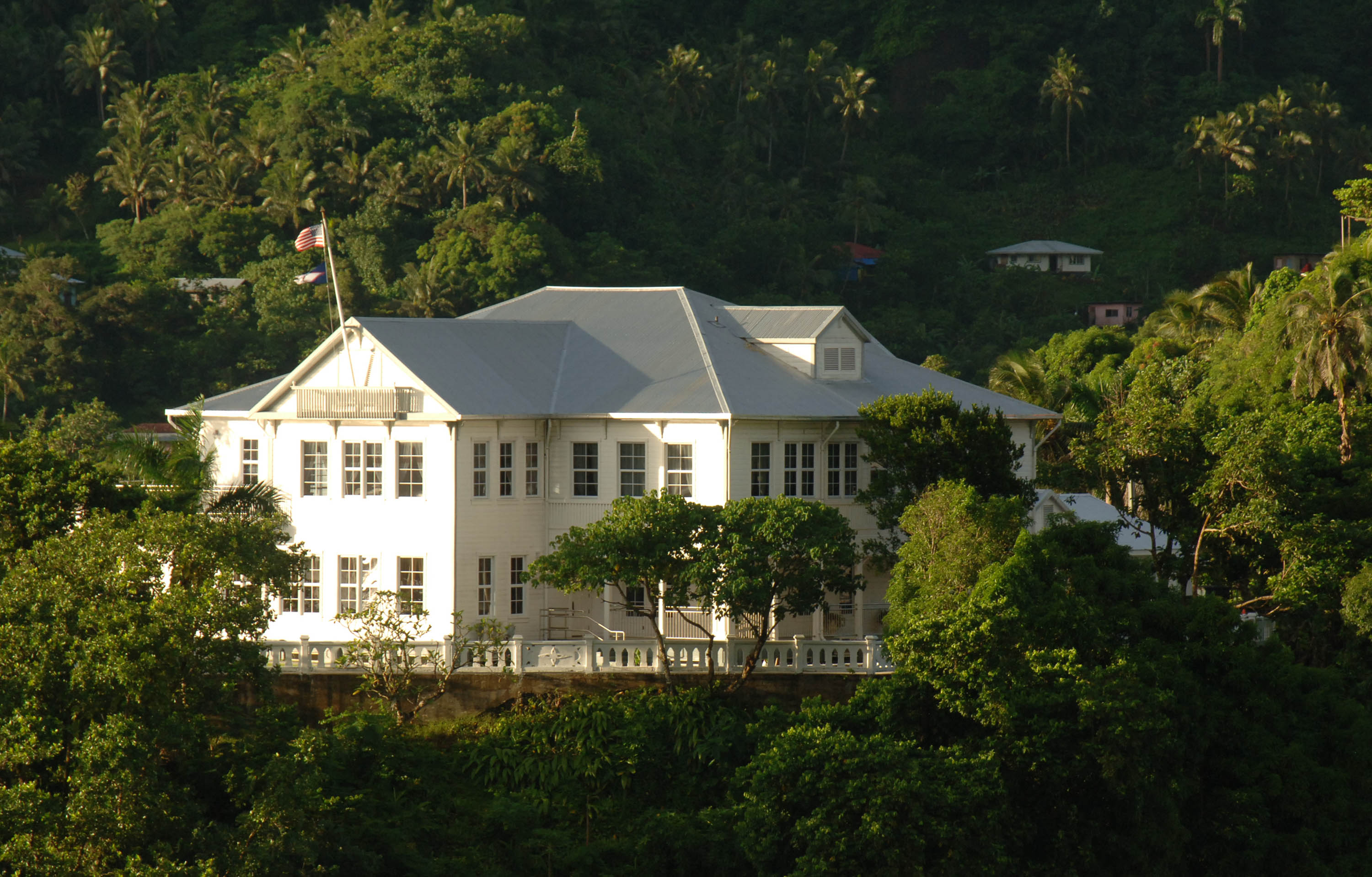
- Government House in 2007
- Location: Fagatogo, Pago Pago Harbor, American Samoa
- Coordinates: 14°16′38″S 170°40′59″W
- Area: 1.4 acres (5,700 m^{2})
- Built: 1903
- Architectural style: Victorian
- Part of: U.S. Naval Station Tutuila Historic District (ID90000854)
- NRHP reference No.: 72001443

Significant dates
- Added to NRHP: March 16, 1972
- Designated NHL: December 14, 1990

Government House, also known as Building No.1, Naval Station, Tutuila or Government House, U.S. Naval Station Tutuila, is a historic government building on the grounds of the former United States Naval Station Tutuila in Pago Pago, American Samoa. Built in 1903, it has served as a center of government on the island for much of the time since then. Government House was listed on the United States National Register of Historic Places in 1972, and was declared a National Historic Landmark in 1990.

It has a tropical Victorian military style. Guided by Benjamin Franklin Tilley, the first commandant of the U.S. Naval Station Tutuila, it was intended to accommodate future governors. The construction, which cost $15,000, relied on Samoan laborers overseen by naval architects and two skilled carpenters from the U.S.

Government House is located in Fagatogo on Maugaoalii Mt. and overlooks the Pago Pago Bay area on all sides of its mountaintop location.

== Description and history ==
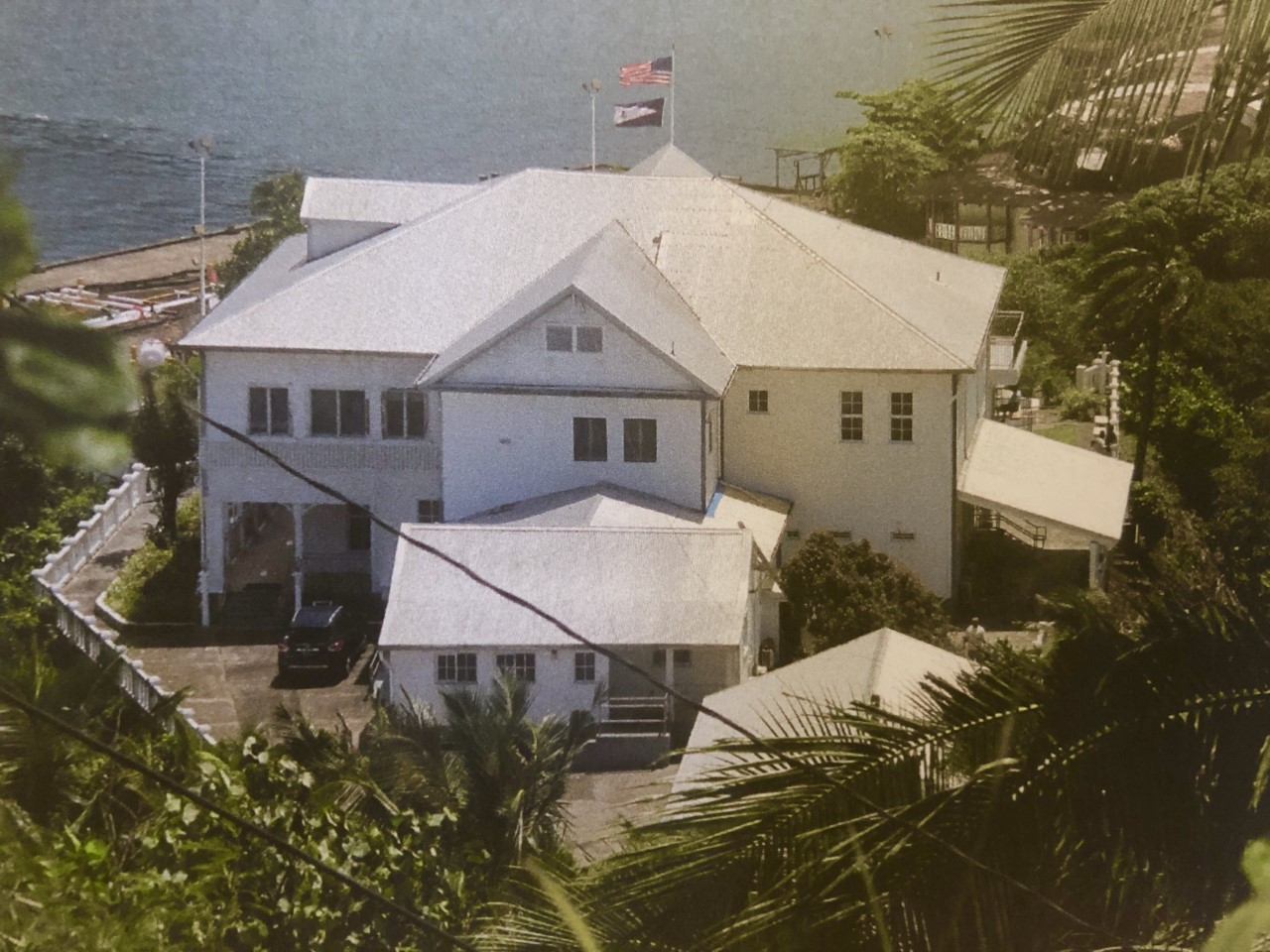
Government House from the rear side

Government House is set on Observatory Point, located at the crook of the L-shaped Pago Pago Harbor, between the villages of Utulei and Fagatogo. The original block of the house is a wood frame cruciform structure, mounted on concrete piers. It is two stories in height, with a corrugated metal roof and clapboard siding. As built it was nearly encircled by porches on both levels, but portions of these have been enclosed. A one-room addition extends the building to the east. Due to its siting on a ridge sometimes exposed to hurricane-force winds, the building is secured by ten-foot metal spikes embedded in the ground.

The interior of the house has features unique to its location and status. The ground floor has five public rooms, including a large dining room, a formal sitting area, and a distinctively Samoan room, lined with tapa cloth and housing Samoan artifacts. Another aspect of the property's public role is the presence of a ceremonial guest house (fala tele) on the property.

When the United States gained control of what is now American Samoa due to the Tripartite Convention of 1899, the island was placed under the administration of the United States Navy. This house was built on the orders of Admiral Uriel Sebree in 1903. From this house naval governors administered the territory until 1951, when administration was turned over to the United States Department of the Interior. It has since been the official residence of the territory's civilian governors, and has been host to virtually every major dignitary to visit the island.

== See also ==
- National Register of Historic Places listings in American Samoa
- List of United States National Historic Landmarks in United States commonwealths and territories, associated states, and foreign states
