= US Naval Advance Bases =

Overseas US Naval Bases

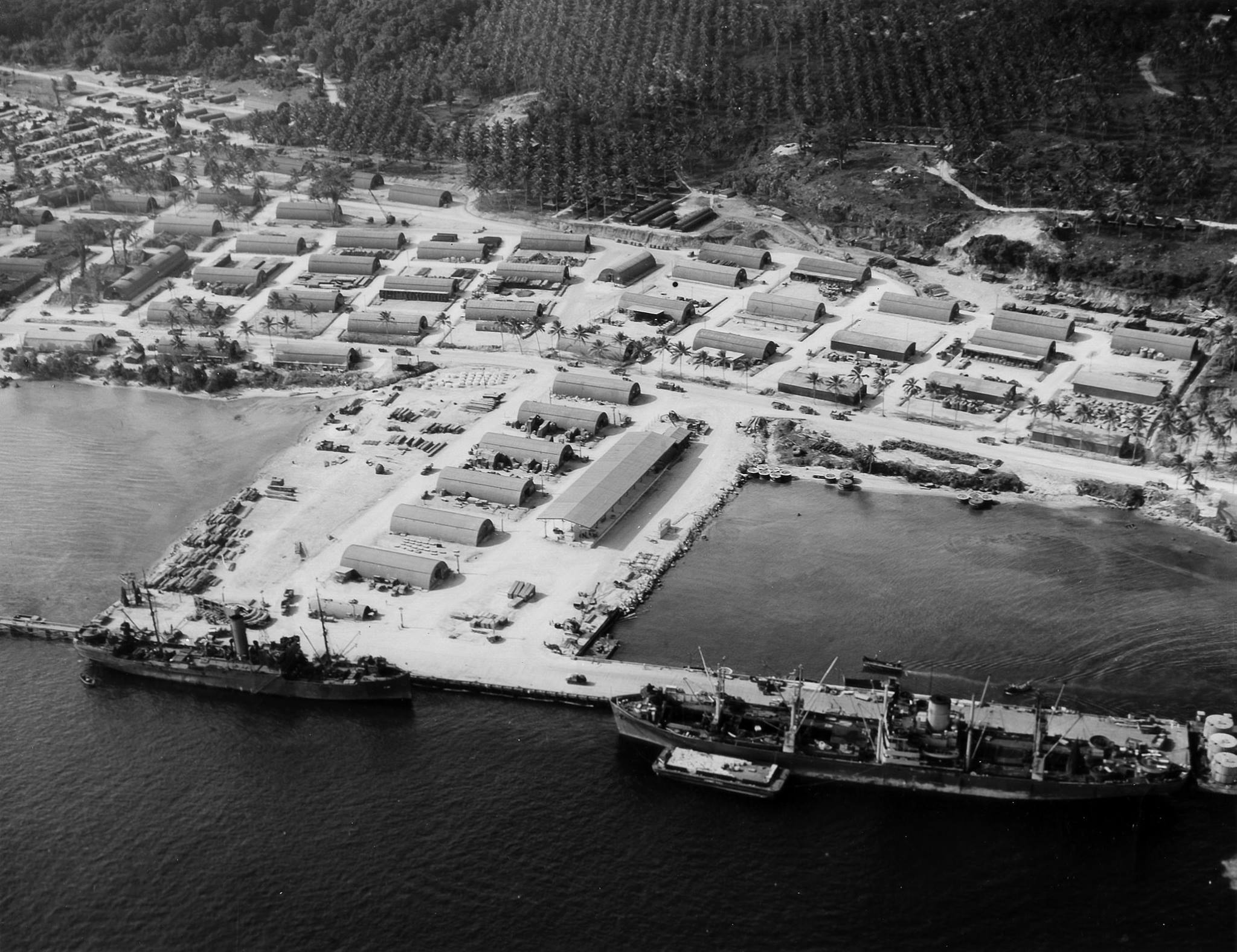
Naval Advance Base Espiritu Santo docks, now part of the City of Luganville

US Naval Advance Bases were built globally by the United States Navy during World War II to support and project U.S. naval operations worldwide. A few were built on Allied soil, but most were captured enemy facilities or completely new. Advance bases provided the fleet with support to keep ships tactically available with repair and supply depots of facilities, rather than return them to the continental United States. Before Japan declared war on the United States the U.S. Navy had a single fleet-sized advance base in the Territory of Hawaii at Naval Station Pearl Harbor. During the war the U.S. Navy Seabees built over 400 advance bases categorized by size. Naval bases were either Lions or Cubs while airfields were either Oaks or Acorns. Lions and Oaks were major facilities while Cubs and Acorns were minor. PT Boats typically would get a Cub and airfields with single runways were Acorns. The larger bases could provide refueling and overhaul; loading of troopship and cargo ships; and preparing amphibious assault ships. Some became major repair depots. The Seabees developed auxiliary floating drydocks which were able to repair battle damage and do regular maintenance in the field, saving ships trans-pacific trips for repair. A few bases also were developed to be R and R for all U.S. personnel. Most Advance Bases were built by the US Navy's Seabees in Naval Construction Battalions (CBs). At the start of the war civilian contractors were employed in construction. The Seabees in World War II built most of the airfields used by the United States Army Air Forces and United States Marine Corps, as they had the ships and cranes needed to transport the vast amount of equipment needed at the advance bases. The US Army and United States Coast Guard also operated out of many of these facilities. Seabees could build new or repair damaged runways, and with advancements in heavy bomber technology lengthen runways as needed. A few Naval Advance Bases were built for the Korean War and Vietnam War.

== Advance bases ==
Built at the bases were personnel housing, piers, roads, shops, power plants, water plants, along with large storage depots containing fuel, ammunition, food, and other consumable supplies. Fuel for ships, airplanes and vehicles was in much demand; 25,000,000 barrels of fuel was shipped to Pacific bases in just June 1945. During World War 2, in Guam alone one million gallons of aviation gasoline were needed each day. Over 325,000 Seabees troops built bases. The many bases were needed for the logistics needs of the troops around the world. On the home front many new ships and boats were built the West coast and East coast, Great Lakes and the Gulf of Mexico. Under the Emergency Shipbuilding Program and War Shipping Administration contracts went out to shipyards and Ironwork works companies across the country. Ports were needed for many new cargo ships to dock, such as the 2,710 Liberty ships and 531 Victory ships built, plus the many new tankers and new warships. In the South Pacific, Seabees operated coral pit mines, as crushed coral was used for runways, roads, sidewalks, and more. Many runways were built using steel Marston Mats. At some bases Seabees built sawmills, to produce local timber. Floating pile drivers were used to build piers, docks, and wharves. If pile driving was not suitable, a floating wharf was built. To protect ships and the ports, they needed to build and repaired quickly and runways. Sometimes Seabees set up electric generator lighting and worked around the clock to complete runways. For housing, offices, mess halls, and depots a vast number of quonset huts of different sizes were built. The Pacific island hopping campaigns, gave new work to be done each day.

At the end of World War 2, almost all of the bases were closed, many were abandoned. A vast amount of vehicles, supplies and equipment at the bases was deemed not needed and too costly to ship to the U.S. Bringing the gear home also would have hurt home front industries, as there was already a vast amount of military surplus. Much of the equipment was destroyed. Some was given to the local governments as a thank you for the land use. Some of the abandoned bases were used for local military, some turned into towns and ports, like Naval Advance Base Espiritu Santo. Some of the abandoned airfields turned into local and international airports, a post-war Seabees legacy.

The need for advance bases during World War II was so great, that in some cases some Pacific Ocean islands were too small for the demand. So in 1943, the US Navy created Service Squadrons. A Service Squadron was a small fleet of ships that acted as an advance base. A service squadron would have: tankers, Fleet oilers, Troopship-barracks ships, refrigerator ships, ammunition ships, supply ships, floating docks, different kinds of barges and repair ships. They provided diesel, ordnance, aviation fuel, food stuffs, and all other supplies.

== Active bases ==
- Naval Base Guam, (Battle of Guam), opened 1944
- Naval Undersea Warfare Center, Detachment AUTEC, Bahamas, opened 1958
- Naval Support Activity Bahrain, opened 1941
- Naval Support Facility Diego Garcia, British Indian Ocean Territory, opened 1971
- Guantanamo Bay Naval Base, Cuba, opened 1898
- Camp Lemonnier, Djibouti, opened 2002
- Naval Support Activity Souda Bay, Souda Bay, Crete, opened 1951
- Naval Air Station Sigonella, Italy, 1957
- Naval Support Activity Naples, Italy, 1951
  - Naval Computer and Telecommunications Station Naples, Italy, Italy, opened 1963
- Naval Air Facility Atsugi, Japan, opened 1950
- Naval Forces Japan, Okinawa, Japan, 1945 (Naval Facility Okinawa)
- United States Fleet Activities Yokosuka, Japan, opened 1870
- United States Fleet Activities Sasebo, Japan, opened 1883
- Misawa Air Base, Japan, opened 1945
- Camp Patriot at the Kuwait Naval Base (Gulf War), opened 2003
- Port of Duqm, Masirah, and Port of Salalah Oman, opened 1980
- Naval Medical Research Unit Six, Peru, opened 1983
- Commander Fleet Activities Chinhae, South Korea, opened 1946
- Naval Station Rota Spain, opened 1953
- Fujairah Naval Base, Port of Fujairah, Base at Fujairah International Airport, United Arab Emirates (Operation Earnest Will), opened 1987
- Jebel Ali Port Facility in United Arab Emirates Port, port use, no base, opened 1979.
- US Navy operates out of Marine Corps Air Station Iwakuni, Japan opened 1950

== Closed bases ==
=== Major advance bases ===
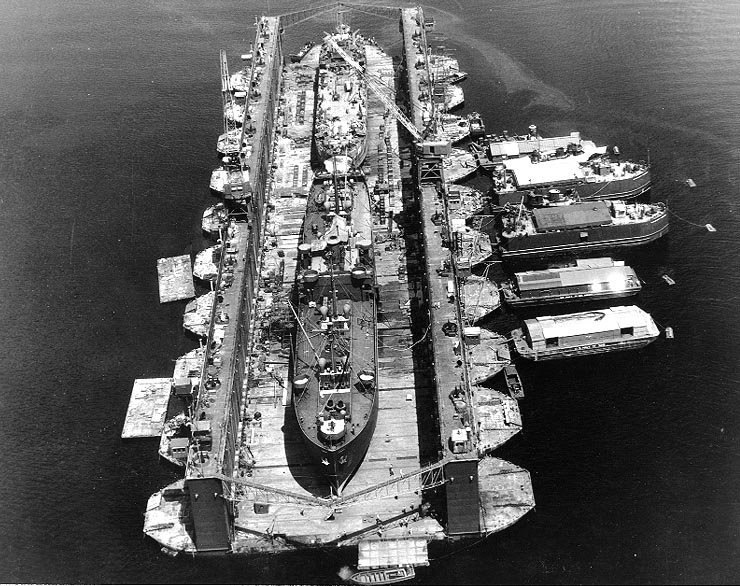
Artisan with USS Antelope (IX-109) and LST-120 in the dock at Espiritu Santo in January 1945

- Naval Advance Base Espiritu Santo at Espiritu Santo was the first large advance base built in the Pacific. Closed 1946
- Majuro Submarine Base at Majuro Atoll - Harbor, Sub base, Fleet recreational center, two airfields (1940–1945)
- Manus Naval Base in the Admiralty Islands - Lombrum Naval Base - Seeadler Harbor (1943–1947)
- Naval Advance Base Saipan, included East Field (Saipan), Aslito Field and Marpi Point Field, seaplane base, hospital, depot (Battle of Saipan)
- Naval Base Perth
- Naval Base Trinidad, operated off and on shore, part became Carlsen Air Force Base
- Naval Base Brisbane, Australia
- Tinian Naval Base, on Tinian including North Field, West Field, closed in 1947 (Battle of Tinian)
- Naval Air Station Bermuda closed 1995
- U.S. Naval Base Subic Bay (Olongapo Naval Station) closed 1992, now Subic Special Economic and Freeport Zone
- Leyte-Samar Naval Base (1944–1947)
- Naval Base Fiji (1942–1945)
- Naval Base Noumea at Nouméa, New Caledonia, major staging base (1942–1956)
- Naval Base Eniwetok at Enewetak Atoll base, including Eniwetok Airfield, seaplane base Parry Island, recreational center
- Naval Base Ulithi, Western Carolines, Major anchoring, 3,500-foot runway, seaplane base, recreational center, Hospital on Sorlen Island. Closed in 1945
- Naval Base Peleliu, at Peleliu
- Naval Base Iwo Jima at Iwo Jima
- Naval Base Okinawa, PT Boat base, seaplane base, hospital, depot, repair depot airfields
- Naval Station Sangley Point in the Philippine closed 1971
- Naval Base Milne Bay at Milne Bay - seaplane base, PT Boats, depot - ship repair - hospital - amphibious training center
- Naval Air Facility Midway Island (Battle of Midway)
- Wake Island Airfield (Battle of Wake Island)
- Naval Air Station Keflavik, Iceland
- Naval Station Argentia in Newfoundland, closed 1994
- Naval Air Station Bermuda Annex
- Mulberry harbour, Normandy Operation Overlord, Navy built harbour

=== Rear Pacific area ===
- Naval Base Panama Canal Zone
- United States Naval Station Tutuila, Samoa - depot, repair (1921–1951)
- Naval Base Upolu at Upolu Island, Samoa - Advance Base (1942–1944)
- Palmyra Island Palmyra Island Naval Air Station - Advance Base (1939–1947)
- Naval Base Funafuti , Funafuti, Ellice Islands - Advance base - Air Base, anchorage and small hospital
- Nanumea - Nanumea Airfield closed 1945
- Nukufetau - Nukufetau Airfield closed 1945
- Canton Island port and Airfield closed 1945
- Naval Base Johnston Atoll on Johnston Atoll, refueling station support of airbase
  - Sand Island seaplane base on Johnston Atoll
- Naval Base Baker Island on Baker Island to support Baker Island Airfield
- Howland Island seaplane base
- Naval base Kingman Reef
- Christmas Island, Kiribati, refuelling and weather station, Cassidy Airfield
- Naval Base Hawaii
- Naval Air Station Barbers Point and Submarine base Barbers Point
- Marine Corps Air Station Kaneohe Bay US Navy base 1939 to 1949
- Amphibious Training Base Kamaole, Maui

=== Philippines ===
- Leyte-Samar Naval Base
  - Calicoan, Samar, port, depot, motor pool, recreational center
  - Manicani Island, Samar Large Advance Base, PT boats, depot, sawmill, ship repair, large floating docks ABSD, hospital.
- Naval Base Cavite, Luzon - Main Base, hospital, submarine base, Closed 1971
- Naval Station Sangley Point, Sangley Point, seaplane base, 5,000-foot runway
- Naval Base Manila in Manila, hospital, seaplane base, Depot, HQ 7th Fleet, sub base
- Liloan, Panaon Island - Advance Base
- Ormoc, Leyte - Advance Base
- Naval Base Lingayen - Advance Base 6 PT Boat, anchorage
- Bobon Point, Samar - 5,000-foot and 7,000-foot runway, Port HQ, PT Boat base
- NAS Guiuan at Guiuan, Samar, 7,000-foot runway, bombers, (now Guiuan Airport)
  - Botic Island, PT boat base
  - Salcedo, PT boat base
- Naval Base Puerto Princesa, Palawan - Advance Base - fleet air wing, carrier aircraft service units, bomber squadrons, seaplane base
- Zamboanga City, Basilan Island, Mindanao - Advance Base, Airfield, PT Boats, repair Zamboanga Peninsula
- Mangarin Bay, Mindoro - Advance Base, Airfield, PT Boats
- Basilan Island, Mindanao, PT Boats
- Iloilo City, Panay - Advance Base, PT Boat, depot, repair
- Malamaui Island - Advance Base
- Polloc Harbor - Advance Base
- Sarangani Bay - Advance Base
- Malalag Bay - Advance Base
- Santiago Cove - Fueling Stop
- Cebu, PT Boat base (Battle for Cebu City)
- Mactan, depot, repair, seaplane base, airfield
- Kabayana Naval Base
- Naval Air Station Cubi Point in the Philippines, used to support the Korean War, (1951–1992)

=== Solomon Islands ===
- Tulagi - Bases, PT boat (Battle of Tulagi and Gavutu–Tanambogo) (1943–1946)
- Rendova Island - Base, PT boat
- Lever Harbor, New Georgia - Advance Base, PT boat (1935–1944)
- Vella Lavella - Advance Base, PT boat at Lambu Lambu Cove (Battle of Vella Lavella (naval)) Support Barakoma Airfield
- Naval Base Treasury Islands, Treasury Islands - Base, PT boat
- Cape Torokina, Bougainville Island - Base, runway built, PT boat (1943–1945)
- Green Islands - Base, PT boat
- Naval Base Emirau Homestead Lagoon, Emirau Island, Hamburg Bay - Base, PT Boats, minor repair base, depots, 3 hospitals, sawmill, two 7,000 foot runways: Inshore and North Cape (1944–1945)
- Henderson Field (Guadalcanal), - Base (Guadalcanal campaign)
- Savo Island - Base (Battle of Savo Island)
- Munda Point Airfield, Naval Airbase
- Segi Point Airfield, Naval Airbase
- Munda Point Airfield, Naval Airbase
- Ondonga Airfield Seaplane base, Naval Airbase
- Naval Base Banika Island Advance Base (1943–1945)
- Guadalcanal Advance Base (1943–1946)
- Roi Island Advance Base (1946)
- Kukum Field, for USAAF and RNZAF
- Graciosa Bay Seaplane Base Santa Cruz Islands VP-23

=== Central Pacific ===
South Pacific islands in 1945

- Naval Base Tarawa, Tarawa, in the Gilbert Islands, runway, depot, Marine camp, hospital
- Apamama Gilberts, airbase, 6,000-foot runway, naval harbor, closed 1944 (Battle of Abemama)
- Makin Island Gilbert Islands
- Enewetak Atoll base
- Peleliu Naval Base on Palau Islands, Caroline Islands, captured Japanese base, three runways, depot, hospital (Battle of Peleliu)
- Naval Base Kwajalein, Kwajalein Atoll, Marshall Islands, 5,000-foot runway, hospital, 4,300-foot runway, 100-ton dry dock, Roi Islands, Ebadon Island, Namur Island, Ebeye Island (1943–1952) (Battle of Kwajalein)
- Majuro Submarine Base, Marshall Islands- Advance Base, Harbor, Sub base, Fleet recreational center, (1940–1945)
- Naval Base at Jaluit Atoll, FPO#3000
- Minami-Tori-shima, Surrendered base
- Chuuk Lagoon (Truk Atoll), Naval port (1945–1947) (Operation Hailstone)
- Weno (Moen) Airfield, port, Naval Air Facilities (1943–1947)
- Orote, Guam, Mariana Islands, Naval Air Station, (1945–1949)
- Naval Air Station Agana, Agana Guam, Naval Air Station, (1944–1995)
- Kagman Point, Saipan, Northern Mariana Islands, Naval Air Station (1944–1947)
- Canton Island, Phoenix Islands, Naval Air Station (1943–1946)
- Tanapag, Saipan, Northern Mariana Islands, Naval Air Station (1946–1950)
- Naval Base Fiji at Suva, Fiji Islands, Major Advance Base (1942–1944)
- Bikini Atoll, Seaport (Battle of Kwajalein), then Operation Crossroads test

=== Caroline Islands ===
- Naval Base Ulithi on Ulithi Atoll, FPO# 3011
- Naval base Angaur Island, on Palau Islands, base to support Angaur Airstrip
- Naval Base at Uman Island, Truk Lagoon, FPO#3048, 4th Fleet anchorage, PT Boat Base.
- Naval Base Kossol Roads, FPO#3027, Fleet anchorage, staging area to support operations in the Philippines.
- Naval Base at Puluwat Island, Truk Lagoon, FPO#3044
- Naval Base at Fefan Island, Truk Lagoon, FPO#3045, captured seaport
- Naval Base at Yap Island, FPO#3014, captured base
- Naval Base at Param Island, Truk Lagoon, FPO#3050, post war taken Airfield
- Naval Base at Tol Island, Truk, FPO#3105, post war taken base
- Naval Base at Sorol Island, FPO#3012, post war small base
- Naval Base at Namonuito Atoll, FPO#3037
- Naval Base at Minto Reef, FPO#3038
- Naval Base at Pulap Island, FPO#3039
- Naval Base at Pakin Island, Senyavin Islands, FPO#3064
- Naval Base at Ant Island, Senyavin Islands, FPO#3067
- Naval Base at Oroluk Atoll, FPO#3075, Oroluk Island had a lookout tower and Oroluk Lagoon for anchorage.
- Naval Base at Ngulu Atoll, FPO#3079
- Naval Base at Namolus Island, FPO#3081
- Naval Base at Tonelik Island, FPO#3082, post war small base
- Naval Base at Woleai Island, FPO#3246, post war, Woleai airfield.
- Naval Base at Hall Islands, FPO#3061, located to the north of Truk Lagoon.

=== Australia, Papua New Guinea & Dutch New Guinea ===
Australia:

- Naval Base Brisbane, Australia, Sub Base, repair depot, Camp Seabee
- Naval Base Sydney in Sydney, Australia hospital, repair and depot
- Naval Base Melbourne at Port of Melbourne Australia, depot, HQ till July 1942
- Naval Air Station Palm Island, Australia
- Townsville Naval Section Base, Australia
- Horn Island Seaplane Base, Australia
- Naval Base Cairns at Cairns, Australia - Base - Hospital, PT Boats, Depot, 40-ton floating drydock
- Naval Base Darwin, Darwin, Australia - Base -mine depot and PT Boats
- Exmouth Submarine Base, Exmouth, Australia called Potshot
- Roebuck Bay Seaplane Base, Western Australia
- Naval Base Adelaide, Australia
- Auxiliary Albany Submarine Base, Port of Albany, Western Australia
- Fleet Radio Unit, Melbourne, Australia - intelligence unit
- Fremantle submarine base at Perth, Australia
- Naval Base Perth, Australia
- Thursday Island PT Boat Base on Thursday Island, Australia - Base, PT boat base
- Palm Island, Queensland, Australia, Naval Air Station

New Guinea:

- Naval Base Milne Bay, New Guinea, Major Base
- Kana Kopa PT Boat Base, Milne Bay, New Guinea - PT Boat Base
- Naval Base Port Moresby, Port Moresby, New Guinea, HQ Seventh Fleet
- Ladava Navy Base, Ladava, Milne Bay - Base
- Tufi, New Guinea - Advance Base, PT boat base
- Naval Base Lae, Morobe River, Morobe Province, New Guinea - Advance Base, airfields, PT boat base - Landing at Nadzab
- Naval Base Woodlark Island, Woodlark Island, New Guinea - Advance Base - 6,500 feet runway
- Fergusson Island, New Guinea - Advance Base, PT boat base
- Buna, Papua New Guinea - Advance Base, airfield, PT boat base (Battle of Buna–Gona)
- Rabaul, New Guinea - Bases around city, not in the town
- Kiriwina Airfield, Kiriwina Island, New Guinea - Advance Base - 6,000 runway
- Dreger Harbor, New Guinea - Advance Base, PT boat base
- Saidor, New Guinea - Advance Base, PT boat base, Airfiled Saidor Airport
- Rein Bay, New Britain - Advance Base, PT boat base
- Talasea, New Britain - Advance Base (Battle of Talasea)
- Aitape, New Guinea - Advance base, PT boat base
- Naval Base Hollandia, New Guinea - Advance Base, depot, repair base, depot, hospital and HQ Seventh Fleet, In Humboldt Bay and Tanahmerah Bay, Closed 1946.
- Naval Base Mios Woendi at Mios Woendi, New Guinea - PT boat base
- Wakde, New Guinea - Advance Base, PT boat base
- Amsterdam Island, New Guinea - Advance base - PT boat base
- Naval Base Morotai, New Guinea - Advance Base - PT Boats, seaplane base, depot, repair, sawmill, (Army airstrips), (1944–1946)
- Soemsoem Island, New Guinea, PT-boat base, closed 1946
- Naval Base Merauke in Merauke, New Guinea PT Boats and 6,000 feet runway
- Naval Base Finschhafen New Guinea - PT boats and amphibious craft base, Dreger Airfield - hospital (1944–1945)
- Naval Base Cape Gloucester at Cape Gloucester, New Guinea, port and two runways
- Biak, Mios Woendi and Padaido Lagoon, New Guinea,after including Owi Airfield and 2nd runway. Seaplane and PT boat base, ship repair and hospital, (1944–1946). Handed over to Dutch Navy after the war
- Naval Base Alexishafen-Madang, New Guinea, Advance Base, PT Boat, repair, closed 1945
- Naval Base Noemfoor, New Guinea
- Naval Base Cape Sansapor, New Guinea

=== Borneo ===
(some bases shared with Australian)

- Naval Base Morotai
- Tarakan - Advance Base, PT boat base
- Tawi-Tawi - Advance Base, PT boat base
- Naval Base Brunei Bay at Brunei Bay - Advance Base, PT boat base
- Balikpapan - Advance Base, PT boat base
- Naval base Labuan Island to support Timbalai Airfield
- Naval Base Timor in East Timor
- Naval Base Muara Island after Battle of North Borneo
- Naval Base Weston at Weston, Sabah,

=== Indian Ocean ===
- Naval Base Kandy at Kandy in Ceylon, shared with Briton and India (South East Asia Command)
- Naval Base Calcutta at Calcutta shared with British and India FPO#918
- Naval Base Madras, at Madras India FPO# 918, Box M
- Naval Base Rangoon, at Rangoon Burma FPO#918, Box R
- Naval Base Durban, South Africa FPO# 911, Box E
- Naval Base Mombasa, Kenya Colony, Africa FPO# 911, Box F
- Naval Base Capetown, South Africa FPO#911, Box G
- Naval Observer Freetown, Sierra Leone, Africa FPO# 62 NY

=== North Africa ===
- Casablanca, French Morocco, Africa FPO# 142, port, depot
- Agadir, French Morocco, Africa FPO# 522
- Port Lyautey, French Morocco, Africa FPO# 214, Advance Amphibious Training Base, Operation Goalpost
- Fedala, French Morocco, Africa FPO# 215, (Operation Brushwood), port
- Safi, French Morocco, Africa FPO# 217, (Operation Blackstone), port
- Algiers, Algeria, Africa FPO# 922
    - Algiers, Algieria, Africa FPO# 728, Box 25
- Arzeu, Algeria, Africa FPO# 232, Naval Station and Naval Air Facility
- Oran, Algeria, Africa FPO# 147
- Mers El Kebir, Algeria, Africa FPO# 233
- Nemours, Ghazaouet, Algeria, Africa, FPO# 235, Advance Amphibious Training Base
- Beni Saf, Algeria, Africa FPO# 236, Advance Amphibious Training Base
- Mostaganem, Algeria, Africa FPO# 238, Advance Amphibious Training Base
- Ténès, Algeria, Africa FPO# 239, Advance Amphibious Training Base
- Cherchel, Algeria, Africa FPO# 240
- Tipaza, Algeria, Africa FPO# 241
- Bone, Algeria - Advance Base, PT Boat base (Battle of Algiers)
- Bizerte, Tunisia - Base, PT Boat base, Advance Amphibious Training Base, Tunisia Campaign, port, depot
- Tunis, Tunisia - Advance Amphibious Training Base
- Dakar, French West Africa FPO# 241
- Naval Observer, Freetown, Sierra Leone, Africa FPO# 62

=== Japan and Marianas ===
- Naval Base Okinawa, PT Boat base, seaplane base, hospital, depot, repair depot airfields
- Naval Base Iwo Jima on Iwo Jima, 3 captured runways (Naval improved them), hospital Central Field, South Field (Battle of Iwo Jima)*
- Chichi Jima Naval Base - Chichijima Airfield (1945–1968)
- Ōmura, Nagasaki, Depot, Port HQ, airfield
- Kure, Hiroshima, Naval Base, after war turned over to Ishikawajima Shipbuilding & Engineering Company, US Navy used part of the base.
- Nagasaki, port for inspection
- Hiroshima, port for inspection
- Yokosuka Naval Base, now JMSDF Yokosuka Naval Base
- Sasebo Naval Base, was Sasebo Naval Arsenal now United States Fleet Activities Sasebo
- Naval Base Tateyama, post-war now JMSDF Tateyama Air Base

=== New Zealand ===
- Auckland, New Zealand, Naval Base (1944–1945)
- US Navy Magazines, Motutapu Island
- US Navy Magazines, Kauri Point Armament Depot
- Fuel Tank Farm, Northcote, Auckland
- Avondale Naval Hospital, Avondale, Auckland
- Sylvia Park Stores, Mount Wellington, Auckland
- Mangere Crossing Stores, Mangere, Auckland
- Halsey Street Store, Wynyard Quarter, Auckland
- Hilldene, Papakura, Auckland
- Little Riverina, Wilsons Road, Warkworth
- Tamaki Stores, Glen Innes, Auckland
- Silverstream Naval Hospital, Upper Hutt
- Trentham Racecourse Hospital, Trentham, Upper Hutt
- Kaiwharawhara Park, Kaiwharawhara, Wellington
- Hutt Park, Lower Hutt
- Judgeford Valley, Haywards Road, Paremata
- Pakiri Beach Camp
- Whangateau Hall & Reserve
- Paekakariki, Camp Paekakariki, Camp Russell, Camp McKay camp
- Auckland outlining camps
- Wellington outlining camps

=== China ===
- Tientsin Operation Beleaguer, airfield FPO#3934
- Shanghai Naval Advance Base (1946–1947) FPO#3930
- Beijing Port
- Qingdao port (1946–1949) FPO#3913
- Chongqing FPO#169
- Changting FPO#180
- Kunming FPO# 930 NY
- Hong Kong FPO# 969
- Tungao port FPO#3019
- Hinghwa FPO#3020
- Ningpo Peninsula FPO# 3022
- Amoy FPO#3087
- Chusan Archipelago FPO#3177
- Tinghai Harbor, Chusan Island FPO#3190
- Taohwa Shan FPO#3274
- Lu Wang FPO#3275
- Wenzhou FPO#3910
- Chingwangtao FPO#3932
- Chefoo FPO#3940
- Naval Air Base Kwangchow

=== Mediterranean ===
- Palermo, Sicily - Advance Base, PT Boat base
- Capri, Italy - Advance Base, PT Boat base
- Gela, Italy - Advance Base
- Salerno, Italy, port
- Anzio, Italy, port
- Nettuno, Italy, port
- Golfe-Juan, France - Advance Base, PT Boat base
- Leghorn, Italy - Advance Base, PT Boat base
- La Maddalena, Sardinia - Advance Base, PT Boat base
- Bastia, Corsica, - Advance Base, PT Boat base
- Calvi, Corsica - Advance Base, PT Boat base
- Sainte-Maxime, France - Advance Base, PT Boat base
- Côte d'Azur, France, port
- Marathon, Greece base, (1962-?)
- Cephalonia, Greece earthquake relief base (1953)

=== Atlantic ===
- Port of Antwerp, Belgium, Port shared with Britain, 1944–1946
- Cherbourg, France - Advance Base, PT Boat base
- Naval Base La Havre France - Advance Base
- Port of Le Havre, France - Advance Base
- Ostend, Belgium, port
- Hengelo, Holland port
- Vreden, Germany, port
- Frankfurt-am-Main, Germany, port
- Bremerhaven, Germany, port
- Rosneath naval base, Scotland
- Londonderry Port, Northern Ireland, Naval Base, hospital
- Milford Haven and other ports, Wales, Normandy staging ports, hospital
- Penarth, Wales, amphibious port
- Bluie West One, Greenland, seaplane base.
- Naval Air Station Keflavik, Iceland
- Seaplane Base Reykjavik, Iceland
- Naval Operating Base Iceland
- Holy Loch Missile base, (1961-?)

=== England ===
- East Anglia Normandy staging ports
- Exeter, Devon, Naval Base, HQ, large depot, closed 1944
- Cornwall, Naval Base
- Dartmouth, England - Advance Base, PT Boat base
- Isle of Portland - Main Base, PT Boat base
- Heathfield, Devon, large depot
- Netley Large hospital
- Lough Erne, port
- Loch Ryan, port
- Falmouth, Cornwall, amphibious port, hospital
- Fowey, England amphibious port
- Plymouth, amphibious port, housing camps
- Salcombe, amphibious port
- Dartmouth, Devon, amphibious port
- Teignmouth, amphibious port
- St. Mawes, small amphibious port
- Saltash, small amphibious port
- Calstock, small amphibious port
- Weymouth, Dorset, small amphibious port
- Poole, small amphibious port
- Southampton, small amphibious port
- Instow, small amphibious port
- Scapa Flow large naval base (British shared)
- Naval Advance Amphibious Base Southampton (May 1944 – 1945)
- Naval Advance Amphibious Base Deptford
- Advance Amphibious Training Base Appledore,

=== Caribbean and South America ===
- Panama Canal
  - Coco Solo, Naval air station for patrol planes and a submarine base
  - Balboa, Panama, Balboa Naval station, depot, submarines, destroyers and patrol boats
- Taboga Island, Panama Canal - Advance base, PT Boats, Training Base, closed in 1946
  - Almirante, Bocas del Toro, Panama, PT-boat
- Mandinga, Panama, lighter-than-air base, three 3,000-foot runways
  - La Chorrera, Panama, Panama, emergency fighter-plane base, lighter-than-air pad
  - Mandiga, Panama, base
  - Gatún, Panama, radio station
  - Arraijan, Panama, tank farm
  - Cristóbal, Colón, Panama, dry dock, repair depot
- Isla Grande in Port of San Juan, Puerto Rico, Naval air station, repair depot, 5400-foot runway and 2300-foot runway
- San Juan, Puerto Rico, Air Station on Isla Grande, hospital, seaplane base, depot, San Patricio, Catano.
- Roosevelt Roads Naval Station, at Ensenada Honda, Vieques Island, Puerto Rico, drydock, 3 6,000-foot runways, depot, a major port.
- Culebra Island, Puerto Rico, one 2,400-foot runway
- St. Lucia, Gros Islet Bay, Puerto Rico, Advance base, airbase, seaplane base
- Antigua, Puerto Rico, base
- Naval Air Station Crabbs at Crabbs Peninsula, Antigua
- Naval seaplane base Exuma, on Exuma Island at George Town, Bahamas
- United States Naval Facility, Barbados (closed 1979)
- Great Exuma, naval air station, seaplane base
- Corinto, Nicaragua, Naval Base and Naval Auxiliary Air Facility
- Salinas, Ecuador, base
- St. Thomas, Virgin Islands, Bourne Field, Lindbergh Bay for seaplanes and submarine base Gregerie Channel, seaplane base
- Naval Station Argentia
- Morgan and Tucker Islands, in Great Sound, Bermuda, support carrier and patrol aircraft, seaplanes, cruiser, destroyer, and submarine base, depot, anti-aircraft training school (Plus Hamilton Island at Kings Point,) Naval Air Station Bermuda Annex
  - Darrell's Island, Bermuda, Bermuda, seaplane base
  - Ordnance Island, Bermuda, submarine base
  - Riddle's Bay, Bermuda, recreational center
- Great Exuma, Little Goat Island, Port Royal, Jamaica, seaplane base
- Antigua, Jamaica, airbase, seaplane base
- Galapagos Islands, Ecuador, Seaplane Base at Aeolian Cove, Airfield, hospital.
- Salinas, Ecuador, patrol plane, seaplane and patrol boat base, closed 1946
- Puerto Castillo, Honduras
- Barranquilla, Colombia, naval air base, and lighter-than-air base, repair shop, also used Soledad International Airport, closed 1945.
- Gulf of Paria, Trinidad, (Carenage Bay, Chaguaramus Bay, Teteron Bay, and Scotland Bay. Chaguaramus Valley and Tucker Valley) Air Station, training and Advance base, fleet base, hospital, depot, ship repair
- British Guiana, Advance base, seaplane base, Lighter-than-air base, (Atkinson Field)
  - Georgetown, British Guiana FPO#12
- Paramaribo, Dutch Guiana, now Suriname, FPO#404
- Amapá, Brazil, naval air base, lighter-than-air base, closed 1945
- Maceió, Brazil, lighter-than-air base, closed 1945
- Belém, Brazil, seaplane base, naval air base, closed 1945
- Igarape Assu, Brazil, lighter-than-air base, naval air base, closed 1945
- São Luís, Maranhão, Brazil, lighter-than-air base, naval air base, closed 1945
- Camocim, Brazil, seaplane base, closed 1945
- Santo Amaro do Ipitanga Airport Brazil, lighter-than-air base, naval air base, closed 1945
- Fortaleza, Brazil, lighter-than-air base, naval air base, closed 1945
- Fernando de Noronha, Brazil, naval air base, closed 1945
- Natal, Rio Grande do Norte, Brazil, Parnamirim Field, naval air base, closed 1945
- Recife, Brazil, Ibura Field, Knox Hospital, depot
- Maceio, Brazil, lighter-than-air base, naval air base, closed 1945
- Santo Amaro do Ipitanga Airport, Brazil, lighter-than-air base, naval air base, closed 1945
- Bahia, Brazil, Aratu seaplane base, ship-repair base, closed 1945
- Caravellas, Brazil, lighter-than-air base, naval air base, closed 1945
- Vitória, Espírito Santo, Brazil, Victoria Airport, closed 1945
- Santa Cruz, Rio de Janeiro, Brazil, naval air base, closed 1945
- Laguna del Sauce, Uruguay, seaplane base, closed 1945
- Salinas, Ecuador, naval air base, hospital.
- Barranquilla, Colombia, lighter-than-air base, naval air base, closed 1945
- Curaçao, Netherlands West Indies, Camp Parera, Hato Field closed 1945
- Puerto Castilla, Honduras, seaplane base, depot
- Gulf of Fonseca, Nicaragua, Advance base moved to Corinto 1943
- Corinto, Nicaragua, Advance base, Seaplanes and PT boat base, naval auxiliary air patrol bombers, fleet depot. Closed in 1946
- Aruba Small naval force to defended oil field, closed in 1945
- Paramaribo, Suriname, lighter-than-air station (Also Zandry Field)
- Suriname, lighter-than-air base, naval air base, closed 1945
- Naval Base Grand Cayman, British West Indies
- Lima, Peru FPO#121, Box L
- Santiago, Chile FPO#121, Box S FPO# 153, Box F
- Valparaiso, Chile FPO#121, Box S

=== Aleutian Islands ===
- Naval Air Facility Adak
- Naval Base Dutch Harbor, Unalaska, Naval Base, submarine base, PT boat base (Battle of Dutch Harbor)
- Finger Bay, Adak Island - Base, airfield, PT boat base, hospital, seaplane base Andrew Lagoon, port at Sweeper Cove, recreational center
- Naval Air Station Kodiak
- Amchitka - Advance Base, Three airstrips, PT boat base
- Naval Air Station Attu Casco Cove, Attu - Base, airfield, PT boat base
- Kiska, Recreational facilities, seaplanes base, depot
- Massacre Bay, airfield, Seaplane base, depot
- Sitka Naval Operating Base and U.S. Army Coastal Defenses, Sitka, seaplane base, hospital
- Annette Island
- Chichagof Island Port Althorp
- Shemya, auxiliary air facility
- Port Armstrong on Baranof Island, closed 1943
- Yakutat Bay airfield, Seaplane base
- Cordova, Alaska Cordova Bay, naval section base, Naval gun emplacement
- Kodiak Island Submarine Base
- Tongass Narrows, naval section base
- Tongatapu Advance Base, (1942–1945)
- Womens Bay, seaplane base, depot, repair, Submarine services, hospital
- Woody Island, Submarine base
- Chernabura, Naval outlying station
- Sand Point, Naval outlying station, auxiliary air facility, depot
- Cold Bay, Naval outlying station, naval auxiliary air facility
- King Cove, Naval outlying station, dry dock, depot
- Chirikof Island, Naval outlying station
- Chiniak, Naval outlying station
- Entrance Point, Naval outlying station, on Sandy Cove on Little Koniuji Island of the Shumagin Islands
- Cape Greville, Naval outlying station on Kodiak Island
- Sanak Island, Naval outlying station
- Afognak, Naval outlying station
- Atka Island, airfield
- Tanaga Island, airfield
- Point Barrow, airfield, depot, dog sleds
- (Ogliuga Island Ogliuga Island Army Airfield built by Navy)
- (Fort Greely and Fort Randall Army bases, built by Navy)
- Borabora Island, Society Islands, French Polynesia, - Advance Base (1942–1946)
- Wallis Island, - Advance Base (1944–1945)
- Alaska earthquake relief base (1964)
- Naval Base Ketchikan now Coast Guard Base Ketchikan

=== Korea ===
For Korean War built:

- Inchon, South Korea, Advance Base (1951–1954) Battle of Inchon (Jinsen) FPO#964
- Pusan, South Korea, landing, (1950–1954) (Battle of Pusan Perimeter) FPO#966
- Wonsan, landing (1950), Yo-Do airfield (Blockade of Wonsan)
- Kimbo (1950)
- Taegu, Battle of Taegu (1950)
- Seabees built the airfields used by Marine and Airforce.
- Seishin, Korea FPO#965

=== Antarctica ===
- McMurdo Sound, Operation Deep Freeze, research base (1955–1956)

=== Vietnam ===
For Vietnam War:

- Naval Support Activity Danang, Da Nang Air Base
- Chu Lai Base Area, Chu Lai Advance Base
- Đông Hà airfield
- Cam Ranh Bay

=== World War I ===
During World War I the Navy had overseas bases, they were not called Advance Bases.

- U.S. Naval Air Station Wexford Ireland
- U.S. Naval Air Station Queenstown Ireland
- Bordeaux, France Seabase
- Brest, France, Seabase
- Berehaven, Ireland, Seabase
- Bantry Bay, Ireland, Seabase
- Azores, Portugal, sub base
- Leith, Scotland, Hospital

== Gallery ==
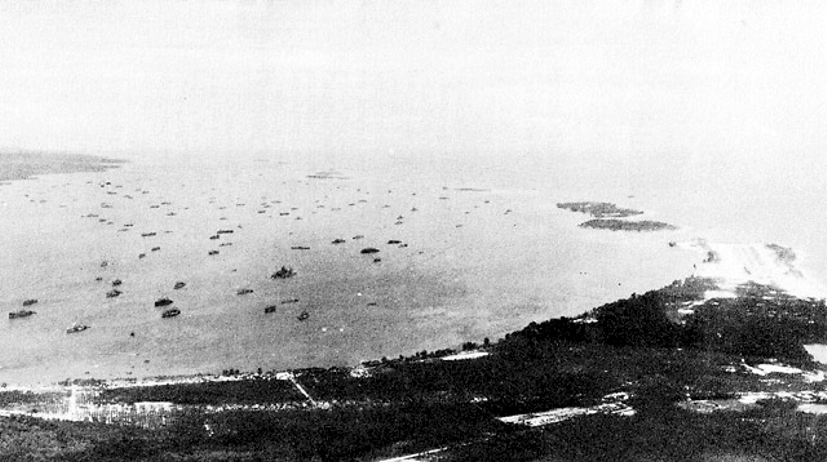
Aerial view of Seeadler Harbor in 1945

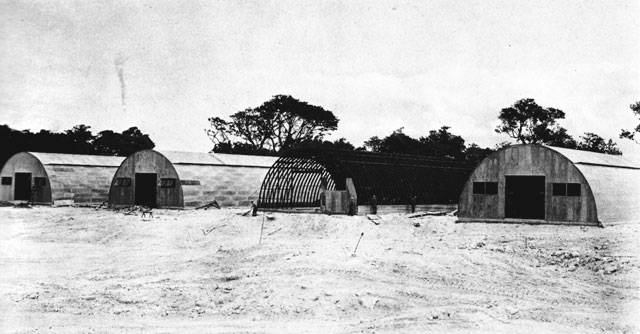
Aviation Supply Annex under construction

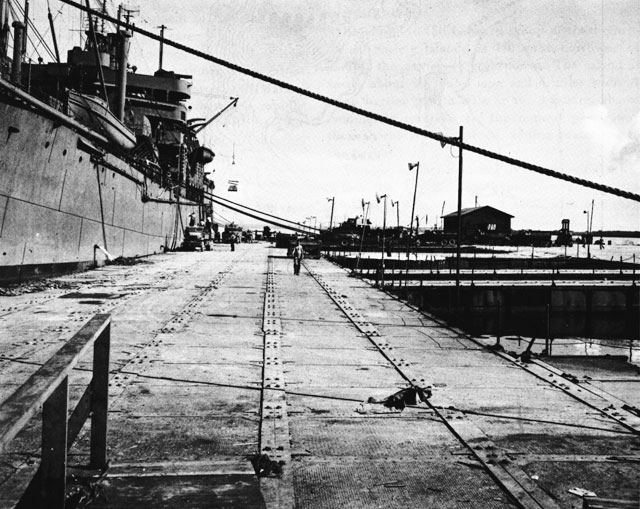
Pallikulo Bay Pontoon Wharf with USS Tangier unloading supplies

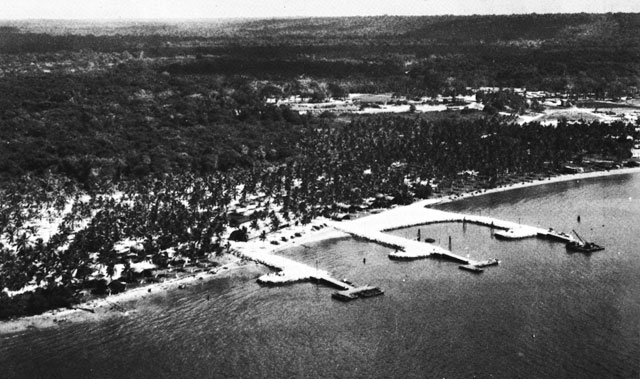
Naval Air Transport Service Facilities

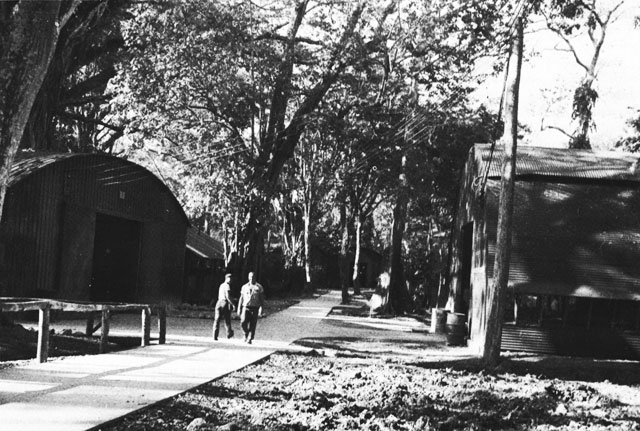
Aviation Overhaul Area

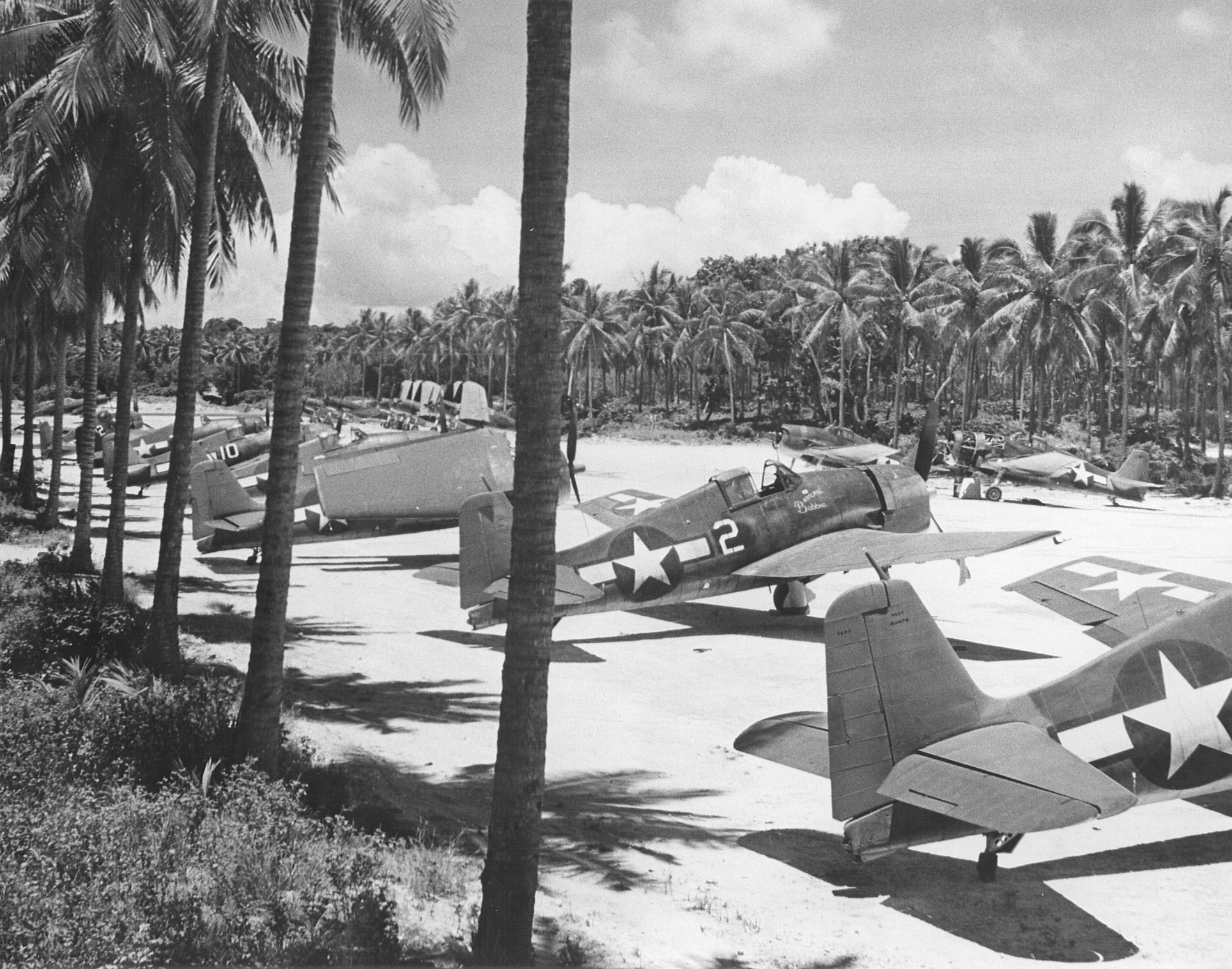
F6F-3 Hellcats of VF-40 in 1944

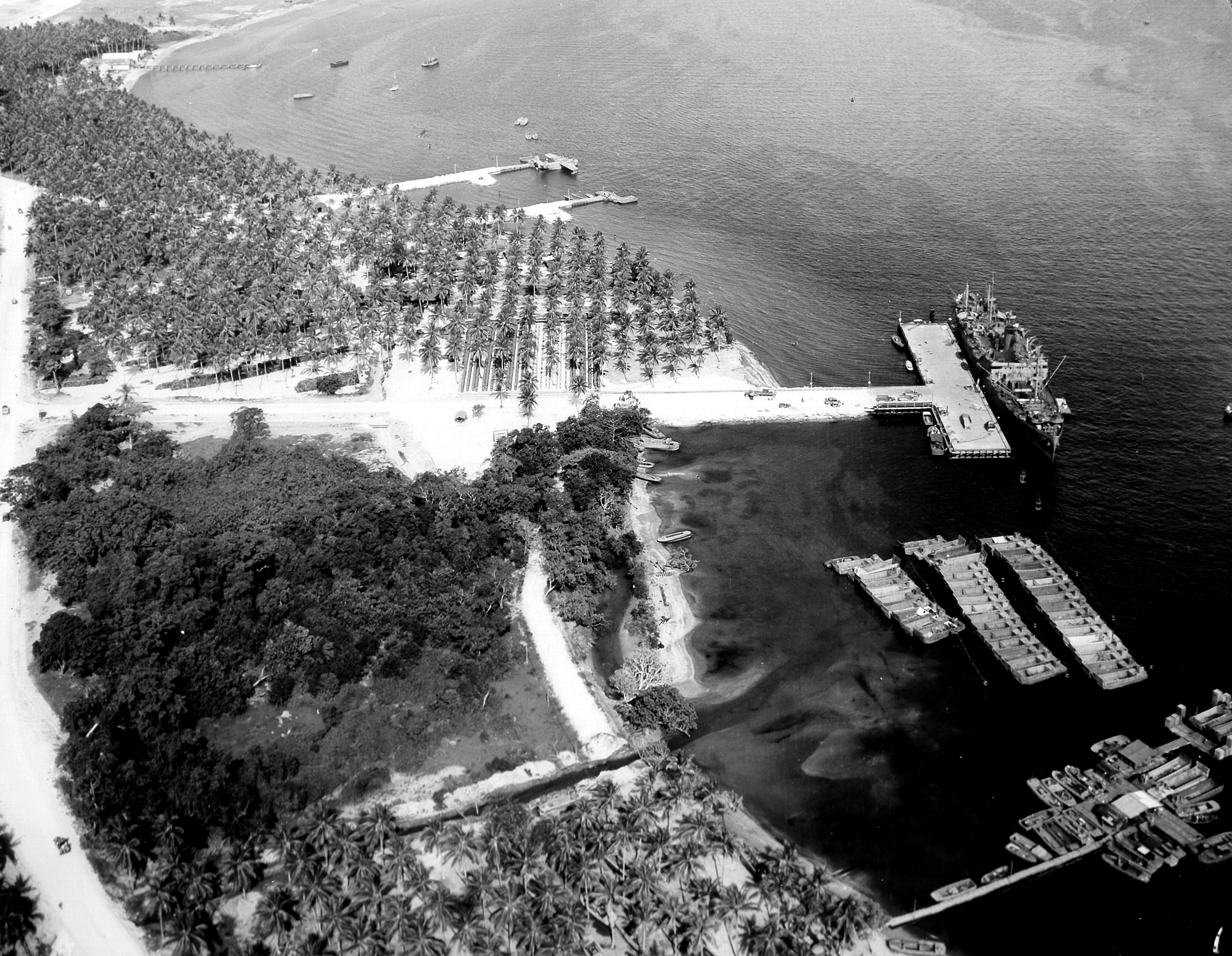
base boat repair dock

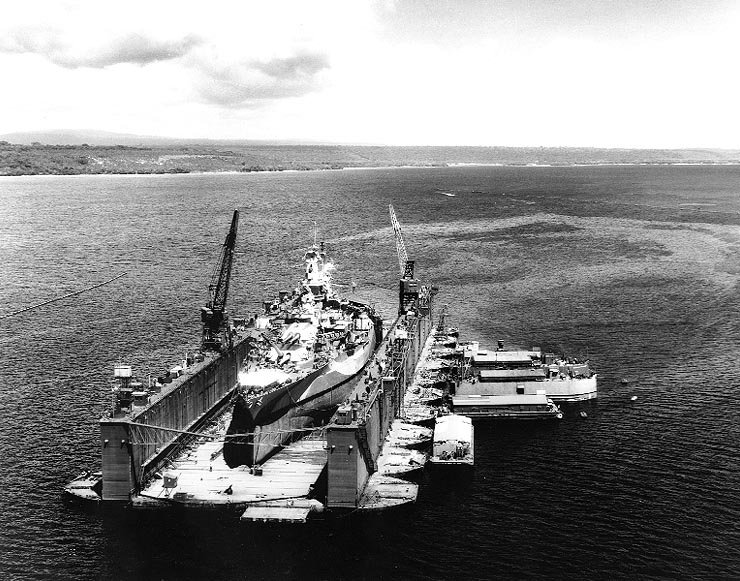
AFDB-1 with USS West Virginia in for repairs off Aessi Island on 13 November 1944

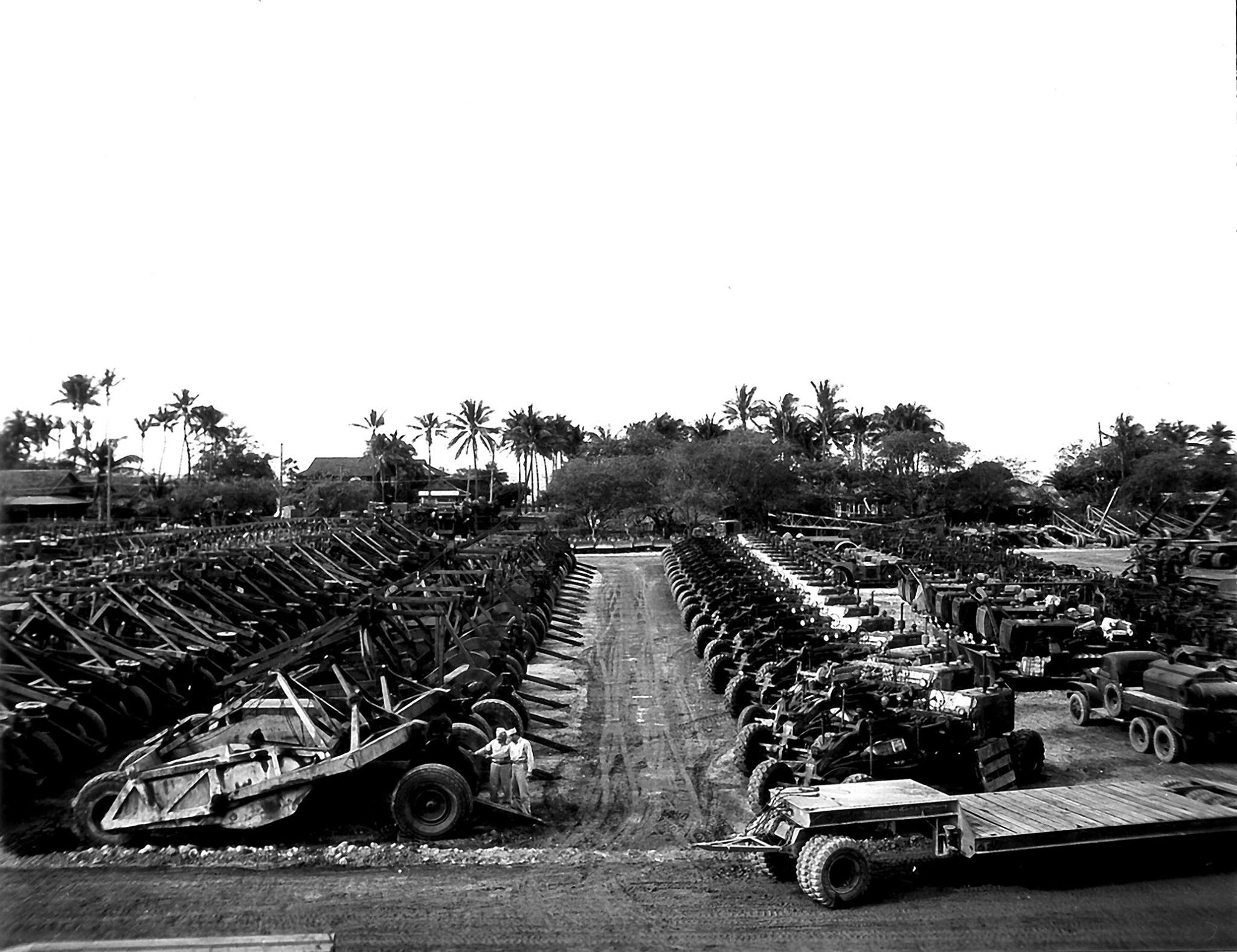
Sea bees depot with earthmovers, used to build runways, ramps, roads and foundations.

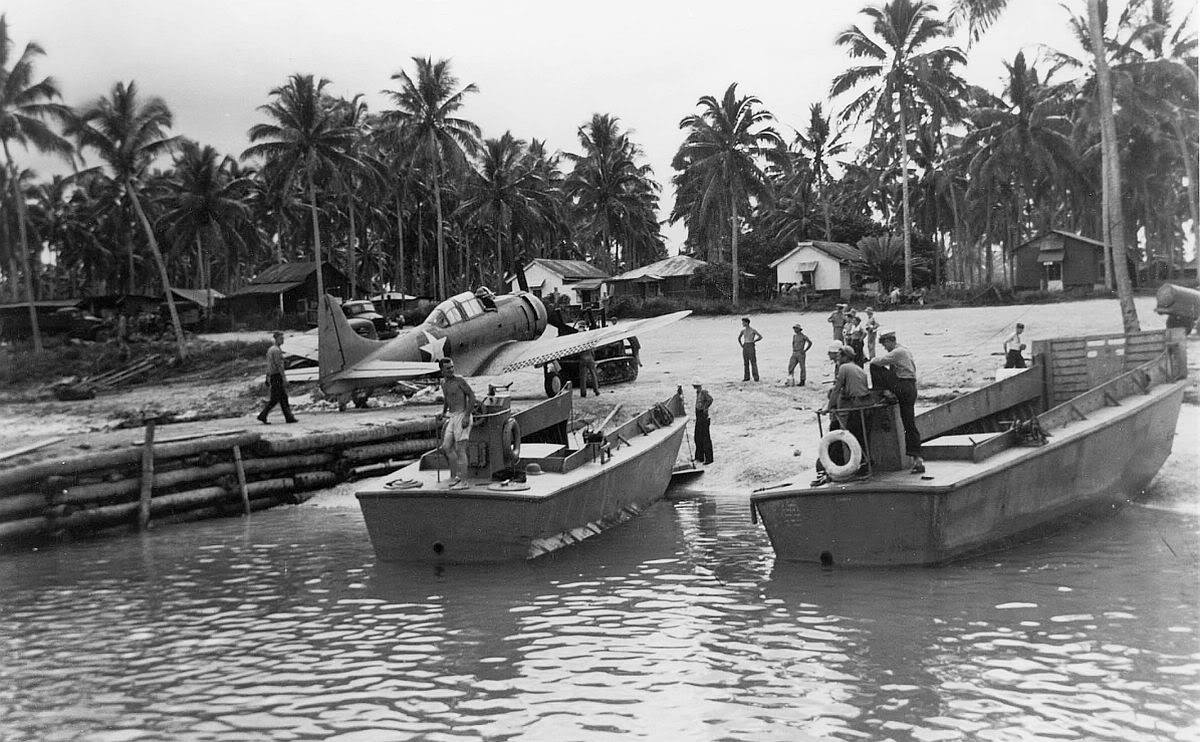
SBD Dauntless being moved small bulldozer and two plywood Landing Craft (LCVPs)

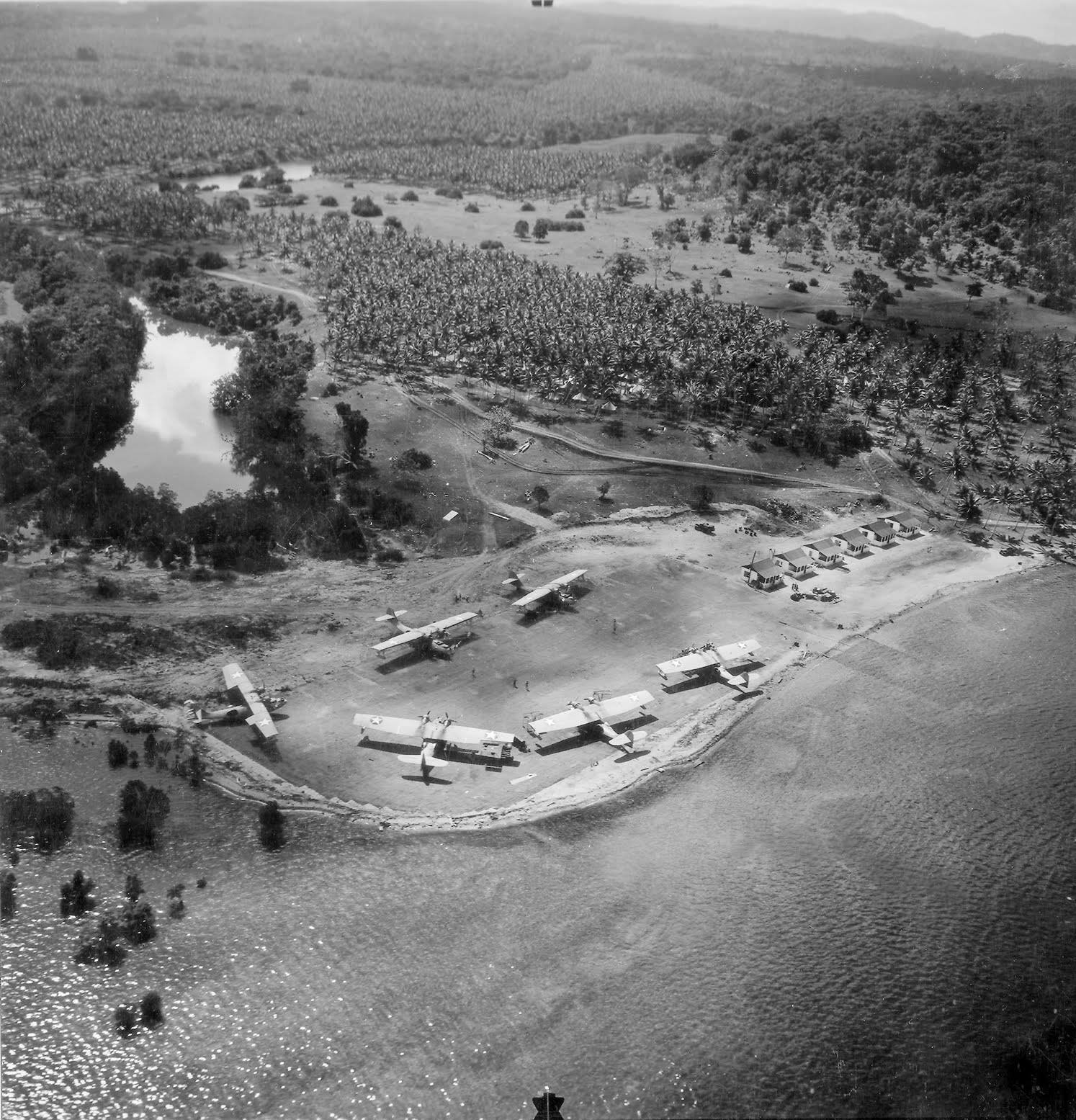
PBY Catalinas at the Luganville Seaplane Base February 1942

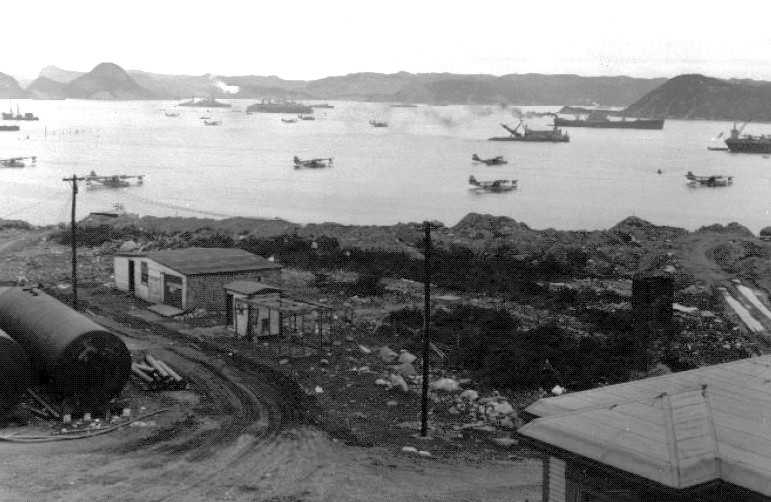
U.S. ships and aircraft in Little Placentia Sound, Argentia in 1942

Naval Operating Base Dutch Harbor hut design

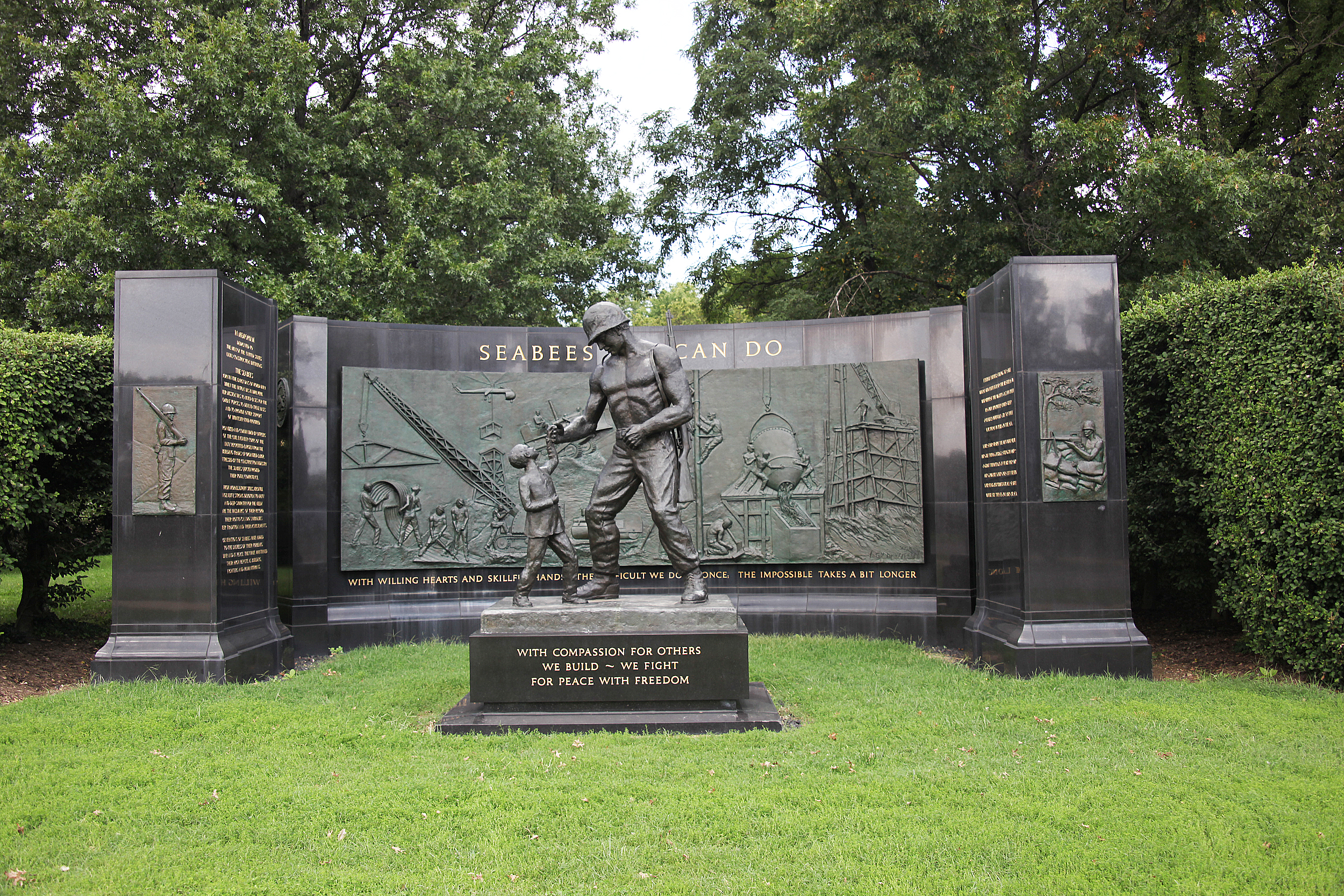
Seabee Memorial at Arlington National Cemetery

== See also ==
- The Fighting Seabees
- Army Transport Service
- Naval Mobile Construction Battalion 25
- Combat engineer
- Underwater Demolition Team
- List of United States Navy shore activities during World War II
- List of naval and land-based operations in the Pacific Theater during World War II
- United States Army Air Forces in the South Pacific Area
- Carrier Aircraft Service Units
