= Naval Base Funafuti =

Former Naval base of the United States

- US Naval Base
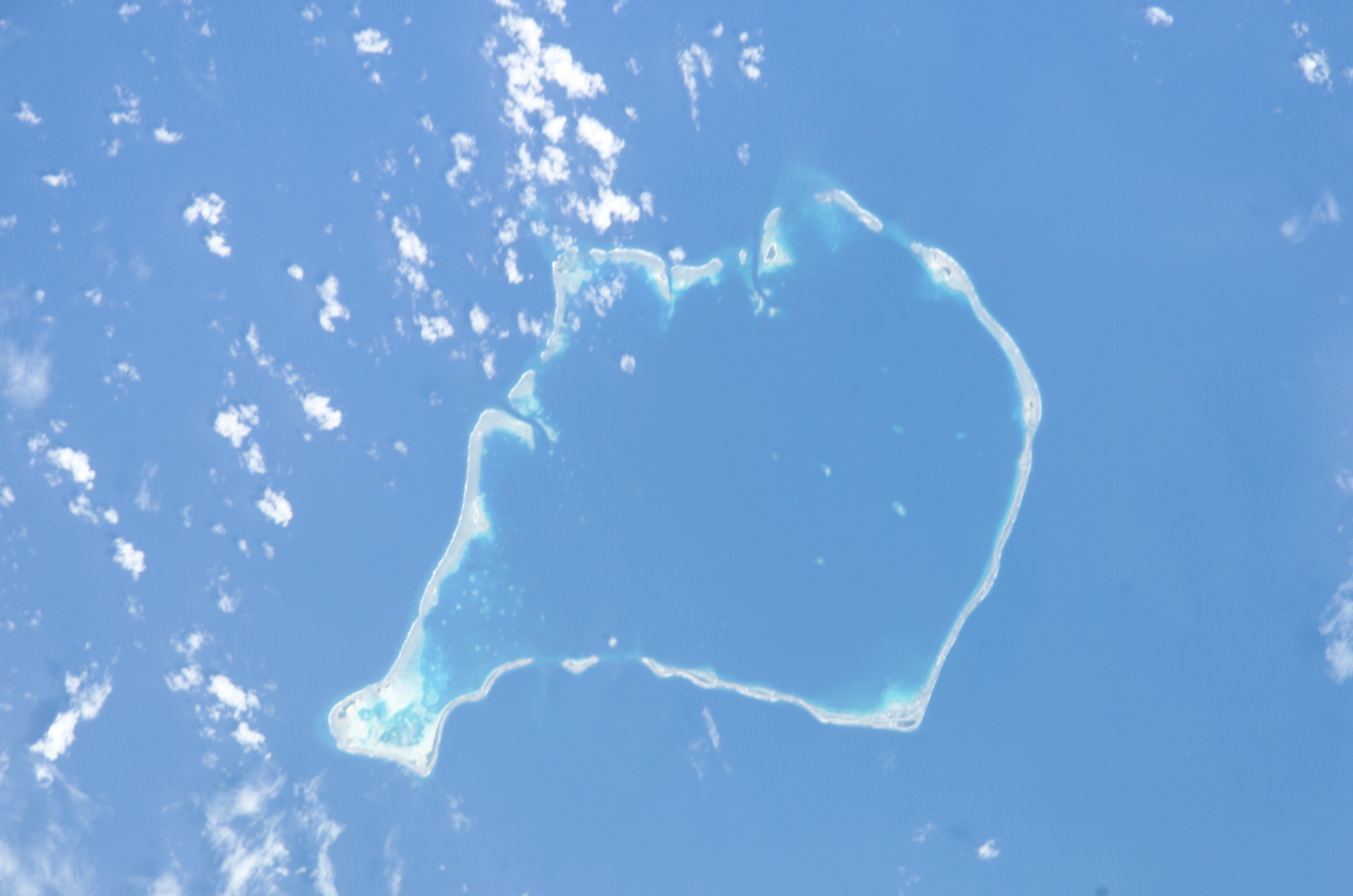
- Aerial image of Funafuti atoll

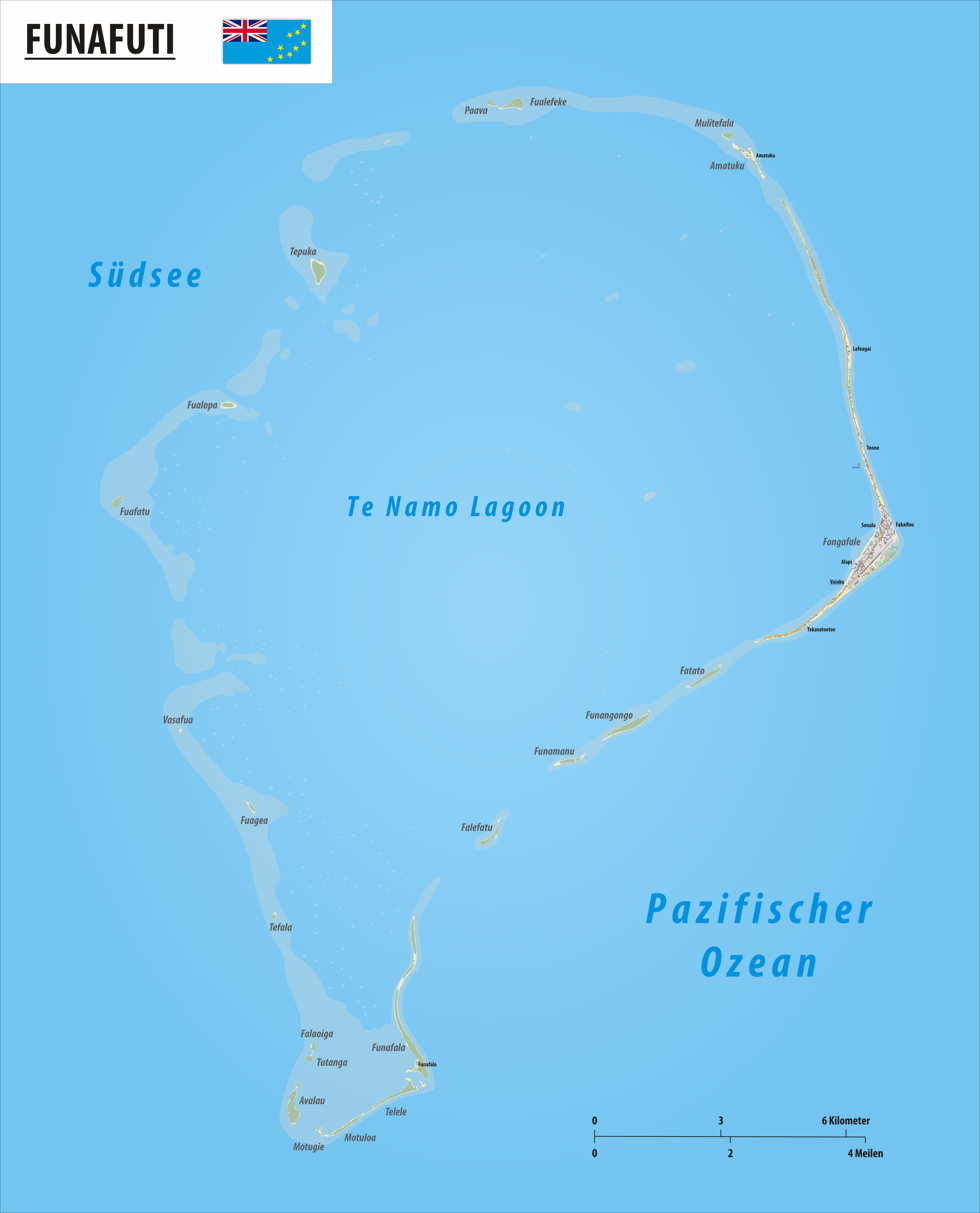
- Map of the atoll and its islands, Funafuti is the eastern most island

- Location of Naval Base Funafuti
- Coordinates: 08°31′S 179°12′E
- Naval Base: United States Navy; 1942-1945

Naval Base Funafuti was a naval base built by the United States Navy in 1942 to support the World War II effort. The base was located on the Island of Funafuti of the Ellice Islands in the Western Pacific Ocean. The island is now Tuvalu, an island country in Polynesia. After the surprise attack on Naval Station Pearl Harbor on December 7, 1941, the US Navy was in need of setting up more advance bases in the Pacific Ocean. At Naval Base Funafuti the Navy built a sea port, a small hospital, PT boat base, a seaplane base and an airbase. The United States Marine Corps landed on Funafuti on 2 October 1942 and on Nanumea and Nukufetau in August 1943. (Note: "On 2 October 1942, a Marine and Naval Task Force from Samoa landed on Funafuti, Ellice Islands. It consisting of the Marine Corps 26th and 27th Provisional Companies X and Y, the 4th Detachment, 2nd Naval Construction Battalion and Naval Administrative Group No. 3 plus the Advance Marine Base Depot formed the post. A few days later Motor Torpedo Squadron 3 (2) began operating from the island...The island was reinforced with the arrival of the 5th Marine Defense Battalion less detachments "A" and "B". The Japanese were unaware that the Americans were positioned on their southern flank until sighted by a passing flying boat in March 1943. By that time United States forces were fully entrenched in the Ellice Islands.") The Japanese had already occupied Tarawa and other islands in what is now Kiribati, but were delayed by the losses at the Battle of the Coral Sea.

== History ==
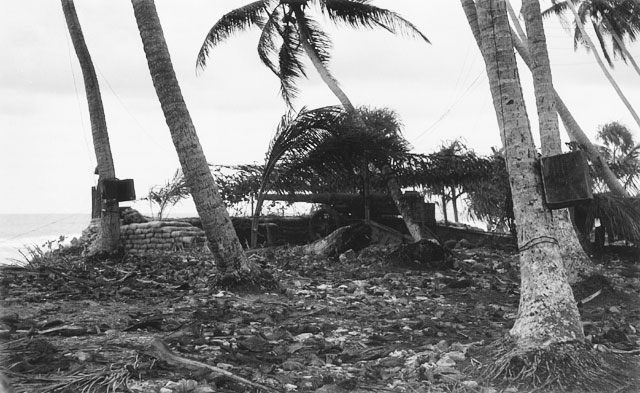
M1918 155mm gun, manned by the 5th Defense Battalion on Funafuti

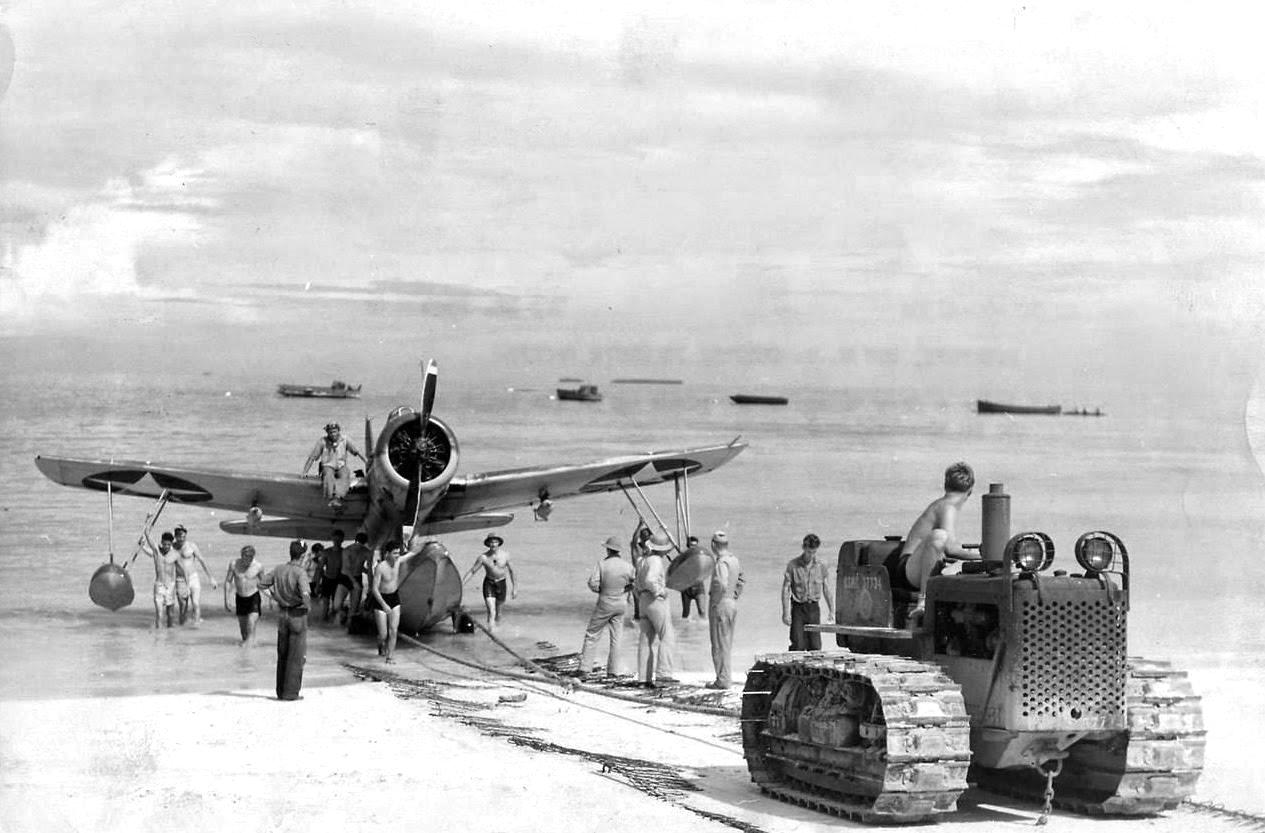
US Navy Marine tractor pulls Vought OS2U Kingfisher on Funafuti Beach in 1943 at Naval Base Funafuti

The United States Armed Forces started the construction of an airfield on Funafuti before the US entered the war. The US Army had some troops on Funafuti and refused the US Navy's request to have a Naval Base on the island in early 1942. The US Navy requested the base as Fongafale is midway between Hawaii and Australia, a key refueling and communications link. On October 2, 1942, the US Navy landed the United States Marine Corps 5th Defense Battalion and arrived with 11 naval ships, in "Operation Fetlock", which was a secret mission. However, on March 27, 1943, the Empire of Japan discovered the new base. Soon after the Marine Corps landing the US Navy started dredging Te Bua Bua Channel, so ships could anchorage in the island's lagoon. Ellice Islanders helped the building of the base, most spoke English, as they had learned it from the London Missionary Society delegation on the island. USS Terror (CM-5) laid naval mines to the passages the navy was not using to get to the lagoon. The port and base were needed for the planned attacks on the Gilbert Islands (Kiribati) that were occupied by Japanese forces. Funafuti is 700 miles (1,100 km) to the south-east of the Gilbert islands The lagoon offered fleet anchorage for up to 100 ships.

After Japan discovered the new base, they made ten air raids on the new base from Nauru on April 20, 1943, and Japan's Tarawa base on April 22. The 10 raids were from March to November 1943. In Japan's raid the Funafuti base, the US Navy's 90 mm antiaircraft guns were able to shoot down six bombers. By November 1942 the Navy completed a 5,000-foot (1,500-meter) hard-packed coral. runway. US Navy Seabee, 2nd Naval Construction Battalion, extended the runway to 6,600 feet (2,000 meters) in April 1943. VMF-441 a Marine Fighting Squadron, did missions with F4F Wildcat, operated from Funafuti from May to September 1943. The new runway was about to land Consolidated B-24 Liberator bombers that bombed Japan's bases on the Gilberts Islands in 1944. The bomders were from the United States Army Air Forces VII Bomber Command.

On December 15, 1942, four VOS float planes (Vought OS2U Kingfisher) from VS-1-D14 arrived at Funafuti to carry out anti-submarine patrols.

In April 1943, a detachment of the 3rd Battalion constructed an aviation-gasoline tank farm on Fongafale`. Funafuti is 1,000 miles (1,600 km) east of the Solomon Islands and 1,200 miles (1,900 km) south of the Marshall Islands. The base was built on three of the nine island atolls of the Ellice islands: Funafuti, Nanomea and Nukufetau. Funafuti is about 13.5 miles (21.7 km) long and 10 miles (16 km) wide. At Funafuti that US Merchant Navy tankers transferred their fuel to US Navy fleet oilers, which transported the fuel into the combat zone to fuel warships. In the lagoon a small seaplane base and PT-boat bases were built.

PBY Catalina flying boats of US Navy Patrol Squadrons were stationed at Funafuti for short periods of time, including VP-34, which arrived at Funafuti on 18 August 1943 and VP-33, which arrived on September 26, 1943.

The Alabama (BB-60) reached Funafuti on 21 January 1944. The Alabama left the Ellice Islands on 25 January to participate in "Operation Flintlock" in the Marshall Islands.

Naval Base Funafuti supported "Operation Catchpole" in the Marshall Islands group during the Battle of Eniwetok from 17-23 February 1944. At Naval Base Funafuti US Merchant Navy tanker ships transferred fuel to US Navy fleet oilers. The fleet oilers would fuel warships ship closer to the combat zone.

By July 1944, the war had moved closer to Japan and much of the base was moved to more forward bases. After the war the airfield became a commercial airport, Funafuti International Airport.

== Patrol torpedo boats ==
US Navy patrol torpedo boats (PT boats) were based at Funafuti from 2 November 1942 to 11 May 1944. Squadron 1B arrived on 2 November 1942 with USS Hilo as the support ship, which remained until 25 November 1942. On 22 December 1942 Squadron 3 Division 2 (including PTs 21, 22, 25 & 26) arrived with the combined squadron commanded by Lt. Jonathan Rice. In July 1943 Squadron 11-2 (including PTs 177, 182, 185, and 186) under the command of Lt. John H. Stillman relieved Squadron 3–2. The PT Boats operated from Funafuti against Japanese shipping in the Gilbert Islands; although they were primarily involved in patrol and rescue duty. A Kingfisher float plane rescued Captain Eddie Rickenbacker and aircrew from life-rafts near Nukufetau, with PT 26 from Funafuti completing the rescue. Motor Torpedo Boat operations ceased at Funafuti in May 1944 and Squadron 11-2 was transferred to Emirau Island, New Guinea.

== Service Squadron 4 ==
As operations at Naval Base Funafuti increased more support was needed. The US Navy started and sent Service Squadron 4 to Naval Base Funafuti arriving on November 21, 1943. The Service Squadron ships supported ships at port and supplement the land base operations. Service Squadron 4 started with 24 ships based at Funafuti port. Stationed at the port was the flagship, a destroyer tender USS Cascade. Service Squadron 4 operated as a complete floating naval base with tenders, repair ships and concrete barges. To keep the fleet in operation and serviced Service Squadron 4 had: repair ships USS Phaon and USS Vestal. Some other ships in Service Squadron 4: The internal combustion engine repair ship USS Luzon (ARG-2), tugboat Keosanqua I (AT-38), oiler USS Truckee (AO-147), hospital ship USS Chaumont, for storage of goods the USS Alchiba; Troopship, barracks ships: USs Republic, USS Henderson, USS Harris, USS St. Mihiel, USS U. S. Grant (AP-29). The USS Mettawee (AOG-17), an oil tanker, served as a station tanker at Funafuti from February through April 1943.

== Supported airfields ==
Naval Base Funafuti, Naval Base Samoa and Naval Base Fiji supported three airfields:

- Naval Base to support Nanumea Airfield at Nanumea, Ellice Islands, closed 1945
- Naval Base to support Nukufetau Airfield at Nukufetau, Ellice Islands, closed 1945
- Naval Base Canton Island to support Airfield in the Phoenix Islands, closed 1945

== See also ==
- US Naval Advance Bases
- Nukufetau Airfield
- Nanumea Airfield
- History of Tuvalu
- Louis Zamperini flyer at Funafuti
- Naval Base Samoa
