= United States Naval Station Tutuila =

Former U.S. naval base in American Samoa

- Tutuila, American Samoa
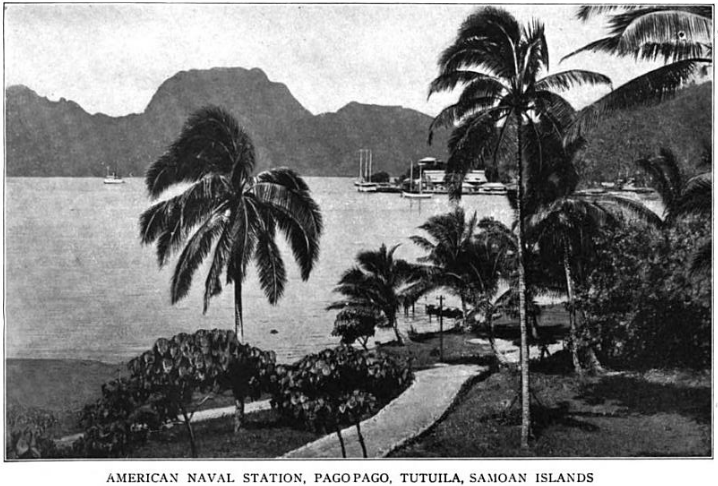
- Naval Base Tutuila, c.1920

Site information
- Type: Naval Base
- Controlled by: United States

Location
- Location within American Samoa
- Coordinates: 14.282°S 170.685°W

Site history
- In use: 1872–1951

Garrison information
- Garrison: United States Navy

United States Naval Station Tutuila was a naval station in Pago Pago Harbor on the island of Tutuila, part of American Samoa, built in 1899 and in operation until 1951. During the United States Navy rule of American Samoa, from 1900 to 1951, it was customary for the commandant of the station to also serve as Military Governor of the territory. Benjamin Franklin Tilley was the first commandant and the first officer responsible for the naval station's construction.

== History ==
Located in the South Pacific, midway between Hawaii and New Zealand, the site was chosen in 1872 by Commander Richard Worsam Meade, who negotiated facilities for a coaling station for the United States Navy from the Samoan high chief Mauga Manuma.

Initially used by Pacific and Asiatic Squadrons, by 1940 Tutuila was a minor naval station. However, with the looming threat of a Pacific War, plans were drawn up for the development of its capabilities. However, as the war moved north and west, Tutuila became a strategic backwater. Shipping arrivals declined after February 1944. Naval Station Tutuila supported the nearby Naval Base Upolu, the two bases had the US Navy code name Operation Straw.

On January 11, 1942, a Japanese submarine surfaced off the coast of Tutuila and fired fifteen shells from its deck gun at the Naval Station in about ten minutes. Most landed harmlessly in the bay, but Commander Edwin Robinson was wounded in the knee by shrapnel and a member of the Fita Fita Guard (Samoan Marine Reserve) received minor injuries. Ironically, the only building damaged by the submarine's shell fire was a store owned by a Japanese expatriate, Frank Shimasaki. The fire was not returned in the only Japanese attack on Samoa during World War II.

Post-war Tutuila's military importance continued to decline, and in 1951, control of American Samoa was transferred from the Navy to the Department of the Interior. Naval Station Tutuila was closed, and the last scheduled naval transport, the General R. L. Howze, sailed on 25 June 1951. The harbor has since returned to commercial use.

== U.S. Naval Station Historic District ==
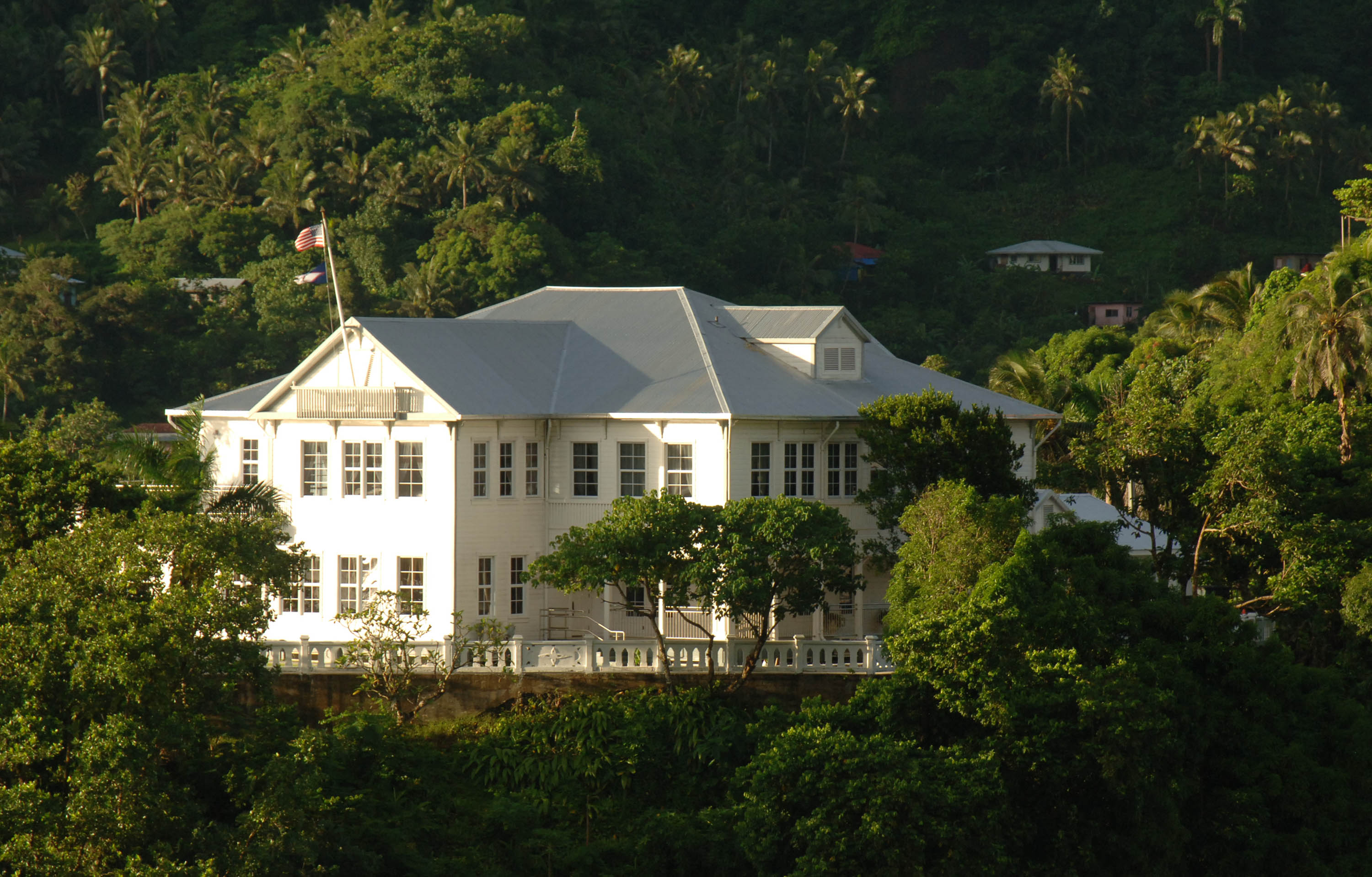
Government House.

The Naval Station had over a hundred buildings at the height of its activity. Today, visitors may walk a 2-mile (3.2 km) tour of the villages of Fagatogo and Utulei to visit some of the station's remaining structures. This trail goes by The Fono, the Old Bake Shop, Old Samoan Jail, Commissary Store (now Jean P. Haydon Museum), the Governor's House, and the Fagatogo Malae.

Sixteen buildings in the former Naval Station are listed on the National Register of Historic Places, one of which—Government House—is a National Historic Landmark.

== See also ==
- USS Tutuila (PR-4)
- List of governors of American Samoa
- National Register of Historic Places listings in American Samoa
- Naval Base Samoa
