= US Naval Base Solomons =

Former United States Navy Bases in the Solomon Islands

Establishment
  - United States Navy: 1942
- Time zone: UTC+11

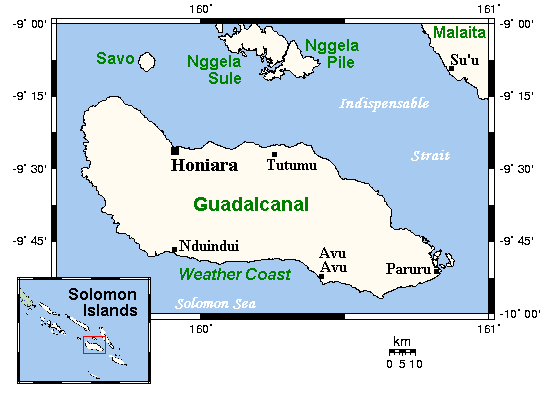
Guadalcanal Map

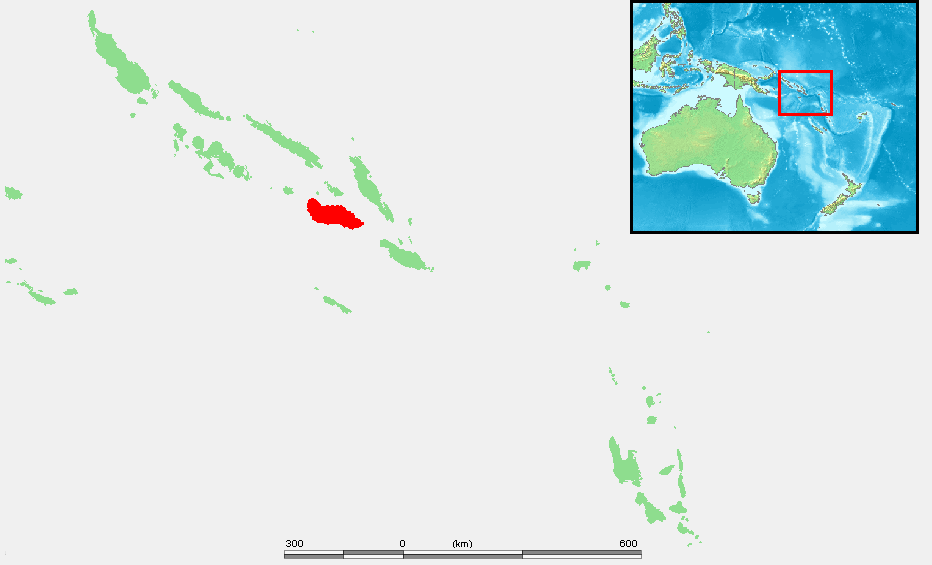
Solomon Islands – Guadalcanal

US Naval Base Solomons refers to a group of United States Navy (USN) bases established in the Solomon Islands in the Pacific Ocean. Most of these facilities were constructed by USN Seabee units during World War II as part of the broader Pacific War.

In August 1942, the United States Armed Forces landed on Guadalcanal in the Solomon Islands during the Battle of Guadalcanal. Following the capture of the island, USN Seabees constructed a major installation known as Naval Base Guadalcanal. Additional naval bases were subsequently built on other islands throughout the Solomons to support Allied operations in the region.

== Naval Base Guadalcanal ==
One of the primary functions of Naval Base Guadalcanal was to support the construction of the airfield later known as Henderson Field. The first aircraft landed at Henderson Field on August 12, 1942. The base also supported the large number of Allied troops stationed on Guadalcanal and served as a staging area for subsequent operations.

The waters off Naval Base Guadalcanal, particularly Savo Sound, became known as Ironbottom Sound because of the numerous ships and aircraft sunk during Operation Watchtower. On July 28, 1942, the USN and the United States Marine Corps conducted a practice amphibious landing at Naval Base Fiji on Koro Island. This exercise was intended to prepare troops for the forthcoming landings on Guadalcanal, which marked their first major offensive of the war. On July 31, 1942, the invasion force departed Fiji for Guadalcanal.

The Guadalcanal invasion force lacked many of the innovations that would later be developed during the Pacific War. Notably, it did not have specialized landing vessels for deploying troops and armored vehicles onto hostile beaches, such as the LST or LCT. Instead, supplies were transferred from ship cargo holds to small landing craft, which transported them to the beaches, where they were unloaded by hand.

Prior to the Allied landings, the Empire of Japan had established a base at Tulagi, a smaller island north of Guadalcanal. After its capture, the USN repaired and expanded the facility. The Guadalcanal bases were assigned the code names Bevy and Cactus, later renamed Mainyard. The codename Ringbolt was used for the operations that captured the Florida Islands, Tulagi, Gavutu, and Tanambogo.

One of the reasons Guadalcanal was selected for amphibious landings was the discovery on June 20, 1942, of a Japanese airfield under construction near Lungga Point. An operational airfield at that location could have threatened maritime supply routes between the United States and naval bases in Australia. Establishing an Allied airbase on Guadalcanal both protected these shipping lanes and enabled attacks against Japan's major base at Rabaul in the northern Solomon Islands.

Both Allied and Japanese forces suffered from chronic supply shortages during the Guadalcanal campaign. In response, the USN improved its logistical supply system, which later contributed to the effectiveness of the island-hopping campaign.

The 6th Naval Construction Battalion arrived on Guadalcanal on August 10, 1942, from Naval Station Norfolk via Naval Base Espiritu Santo, thirteen days after the first United States Marine Corps units had landed. The Seabees discovered an unfinished 3,800-foot runway begun by Japanese forces. They extended the runway by 1,300 feet and surfaced it with Marston matting due to poor soil conditions and heavy rainfall. Construction was frequently interrupted by bombing raids, sniper fire, and artillery shelling. When enemy fire subsided, the Seabees established a camp and constructed a power station, freshwater system, and mess hall.

Supplies were initially unloaded from cargo ships into Higgins boats, tank lighters, and pontoon barges, which delivered materials directly to the beach. Later, three timber piers were constructed to facilitate unloading operations. A pier was also built at Lung Lagoon and named Jennings Landing in honor of Chief Shipfitter Jennings. Roads, bridges, and fuel tank farms were constructed as the base expanded.

The 6th Naval Construction Battalion was relieved by Naval Mobile Construction Battalion 26 on January 5, 1943, and departed aboard the USS Hunter Liggett for rest and recuperation in Auckland, New Zealand. While in Auckland, the battalion worked on the Victoria Park camp and a USN mobile hospital before departing on March 12, 1943, for Naval Base Noumea.

Construction Battalion 26 continued to improve Naval Base Guadalcanal, building gun mounts and emplacements, tunnels, approximately 6,000 feet of railroad track, multiple docks, more than 35 miles of primary roadway, 10 bridges, and two radio stations with 150-foot transmitter towers. The battalion departed on March 2, 1944.

The 58th Naval Construction Battalion arrived on December 12, 1944, and conducted work on Vella Lavella and the Russell Islands before departing on March 11, 1945. The 14th Naval Construction Battalion operated on Guadalcanal from November 4, 1942, to November 9, 1943.

The Fleet Post Office for Naval Base Guadalcanal was designated FPO 145.

== History ==
Following the Battle of Tulagi and Gavutu–Tanambogo in August 1942, naval bases were constructed throughout the Solomon Islands by the 6th and 26th Seabee units. At Tanambogo, an airfield known as Torokina Airfield was built. The Landings at Cape Torokina, designated as Operation Cherry Blossom, took place on November 1, 1943. At Tulagi, the United States Navy established a PT boat base, while a seaplane base was constructed in the Florida Islands.

The United States bases in the Solomon Islands were intended to disrupt the Tokyo Express, the Allied term for Japan's nighttime supply and reinforcement routes from Rabaul to Guadalcanal. US Navy Seabees constructed naval bases and airfields and provided support for amphibious landings across the region. Following the end of World War II and Victory over Japan Day, these bases were closed. Several of the former military airfields were later converted into civilian airports.

Except for some units retained to build, garrison, operate, and defend the base at Tulagi, most of the United States Marine Corps forces that had assaulted Tulagi and the nearby islets were soon redeployed to Guadalcanal. There, they assisted in the defense of the airfield at Lunga Point, later named Henderson Field by Allied forces.

== Solomon Islands Bases ==
- Naval Base Guadalcanal, Fleet Post Office (FPO) No. 145
- Base at Torokina, Bougainville Island, FPO No. 158; supported Torokina Airfield and a PT boat base
- Naval Base Banika Island in the Russell Islands; PT boat base, FPO No. 60; constructed following Operation Cleanslate
- Halavo Seaplane Base
- Base at Cape Torokina, Bougainville; runway construction and PT boat base
- Base at Barakoma, Vella Lavella Island, FPO No. 338; supported Barakoma Airfield and a PT boat base
- Base on San Cristobal Island, FPO No. 3092; surrounding waters known as “Torpedo Alley”
- Base on Nissan Island, Northern Solomon Islands, FPO No. 3202; supported Nissan Island Airfield
- Rekata Bay Seaplane Base at Rekata Bay, Santa Isabel

=== Naval Base Treasury Islands ===
- Naval Base Treasury Islands, FPO No. 811
- Stirling PT boat base at Blanche Harbor
- Stirling Airfield (Coronus Strip), constructed by the 87th Naval Construction Battalion
- Treasury Islands seaplane base operated by Patrol Squadron VP-14 using Consolidated PBY Catalina aircraft

=== Naval Base Florida Islands ===
- Base at Tulagi, FPO No. 152; PT boat facilities and a 20-bed dispensary
- Tulagi Harbor base
- Tulagi Seaplane Base operated by Patrol Squadron VP-14 with Consolidated PBY Catalina aircraft
- Base at Gavutu Harbor, Nggela Islands, FPO No. 705; seaplane base
- Carter City base at Mbolo (Bolo), Florida Islands; large naval supply and repair depot
- Makambo Island PT boat base
- Palm Island fuel tank farm

=== Naval Base New Georgia Islands ===
A number of bases were constructed in the New Georgia Islands:

- Base at Seghe, New Georgia, FPO No. 252; supported Segi Airfield
- Base at Munda, New Georgia, FPO No. 250; supported Munda Point Airfield
- Base at Rendova Island, off New Georgia, FPO No. 251; PT boat base
- Naval Base Lever Harbor, near Kukudu, Vaeimbu Harbour, New Georgia; PT boat facilities at 8.0222°S 157.587°E
- Base at Viru Harbor, New Georgia, FPO No. 254
- Wickham Fleet Anchorage, New Georgia, FPO No. 253, near Seghe and Vangunu Island at 8.0222°S 157.894°E
- Rice Anchorage at Enogai
- Base on Sasavele Island in Roviana Lagoon, FPO No. 529, at 8.328°S 157.339°E
- Base at Vila, Kolombangara Island, FPO No. 627
- Base at Ondonga, FPO No. 626; supported Ondonga Airfield ** Ondonga Seaplane Base operated by Patrol Squadron VP-14 with Consolidated PBY Catalina aircraft

=== New Hebrides ===
The New Hebrides islands lie south of the Solomon Islands and are sometimes included in US Navy listings of Solomon bases:

- Naval Base Espiritu Santo, one of the largest Allied bases of the war

=== New Caledonia ===
The New Caledonia islands are located south of the Solomon Islands and are also sometimes included in US Navy listings:

- Naval Base Noumea, a major Allied naval base

== Guadalcanal Airfields ==
The following airfields on Guadalcanal were constructed after the Battle for Henderson Field:

- Henderson Field (Lunga Point; also known as Bomber Field 1 and later Honiara Airport)
- Henderson Field Fighter 1 (Lunga); abandoned
- Henderson Field Fighter 2 (Kukum); abandoned
- Fighter Field 3, an emergency airfield near the Tenaru River; abandoned
- Crash Strip (also known as the "Grassy Strip"), located near Coffin Corner and the Battle of Edson's Ridge
- Crash Strip, Koli Point, located at Koli Point, near Carney Field and Koli Field
- Carney Field (Bomber Field 2), located near Koli Point and the Metapona River near Honiara
- Koli Field (Bomber Field 3), located near the Metapona River

=== Units based at Henderson Field ===
At Henderson Field, also known as the base of the Cactus Air Force, the United States Navy stationed the following units:

- VF-5, equipped with Grumman F4F Wildcat
- VC-40, equipped with Douglas SBD Dauntless and TBF Avenger
- VF-26 (F4F)
- VF-27 (F4F)
- VF-28 (F4F)
- Carrier Air Wing Eleven (CAG-11)
- VF-11 (VB-11), 1943
- VT-11 (TBF Avenger), 1943
- VB-21 (SBD), 1943
- CASU-11 (Carrier Aircraft Service Unit 11), February 1943 – July 1944
- VS-54 (SBD and Vought OS2U Kingfisher), June 11, 1943 – August 3, 1944

=== Units based at Carney Field ===
At Carney Field, the United States Navy stationed patrol and bombing units flying the Consolidated B-24 Liberator, designated PB4Y-1 in USN service:

- VD-1
- VB-106
- VB-101
- VB-102
- VB-104

== New Georgia Airfield ==
Ondonga Airfield, located on New Georgia, was constructed following the New Georgia campaign.

=== Units based at Ondonga Airfield ===
At Ondonga Airfield, the United States Navy stationed the following aviation units:

- VF-17, equipped with the Vought F4U Corsair
- VF-33, equipped with the Grumman F6F Hellcat
- VP-12, equipped with the Consolidated PBY Catalina

== Segi Airfield ==
At Segi Airfield, the United States Navy stationed the following units:

- 47th Naval Construction Battalion (47th NCB), Seabees, Company C
- VF-38, equipped with the Grumman F6F Hellcat
- VF-40, equipped with the Grumman F6F Hellcat
- VF-33, equipped with the Grumman F6F Hellcat

== Naval Base Banika Island Airfields ==
Several airfields were constructed at Naval Base Banika Island. These facilities were used to support operations against Japanese forces on New Georgia and at Munda.

- Banika Field, used by the United States Navy for Interstate TDR assault drone operations, as well as by the United States Army Air Forces (USAAF) and the United States Marine Corps
- Renard Field, used by the USAAF and by US Navy squadrons VB-140 and VB-148, both operating the Lockheed Ventura PV-1
- Renard Sound Seaplane Base, located near Banika Field in the channel east of the runway; the United States Navy operated this seaplane base at 9.08108°S 159.207813°E

== Nissan Island Airfield ==
At Nissan Island Airfield, the United States Navy stationed the following units:

- VPB-53, equipped with the Consolidated PBY Catalina
- Special Task Air Group One, operating Interstate TDR assault drones; the unit later redeployed to Banika Island

== Operation Huddle ==
Operation Huddle was the code name for a proposed United States naval base planned for Ndeni Island in the Santa Cruz Islands group, approximately 250 miles (400 km) east of the Solomon Islands. The plan was ultimately abandoned due to unfavorable terrain and the prevalence of cerebral malaria on the island.

Following the Battle of the Santa Cruz Islands, Ndeni Island was used in a limited capacity. Although no permanent land base was constructed, the destroyer-seaplane tender USS McFarland supported a flying boat squadron of Consolidated PBY Catalina aircraft at Graciosa Bay anchorage. The floating base departed after the naval Battle of Savo Island in August 1942. PBY Catalina aircraft later returned to Ndeni for reconnaissance missions during the Battle of the Eastern Solomons on August 24, 1942, and the Battle of the Santa Cruz Islands on October 26, 1942.

== Tenders ==
The following tenders were stationed in the Solomon Islands during World War II:

- USS McFarland (DD-237), destroyer converted to a seaplane tender
- USS George E. Badger (DD-196), destroyer converted to a seaplane tender
- USS Williamson (DD-244), destroyer converted to a seaplane tender
- USS Thornton (DD-270), destroyer converted to a seaplane tender
- USS Goldsborough (DD-188), destroyer converted to a seaplane tender
- USS Curtiss (AV-4), seaplane tender
- USS Mackinac (AVP-13), seaplane tender
- USS Chandeleur (AV-10), seaplane tender
- USS Chincoteague (AVP-24), seaplane tender
- USS Ballard (DD-267), seaplane tender
- USS Coos Bay, seaplane tender
- USS Dixie (AD-14), destroyer tender
- USS Rigel (AD-13), destroyer tender
- USS Jamestown (PG-55), PT boat tender
- USS Varuna (AGP-5), PT boat tender
- USS Niagara (PG-52), PT boat tender
- USS Willoughby (AGP-9), PT boat tender
- USS Heron (AM-10), PT boat tender
- USS Alecto, PT boat tender
- USS Vestal, repair ship

== Gallery ==
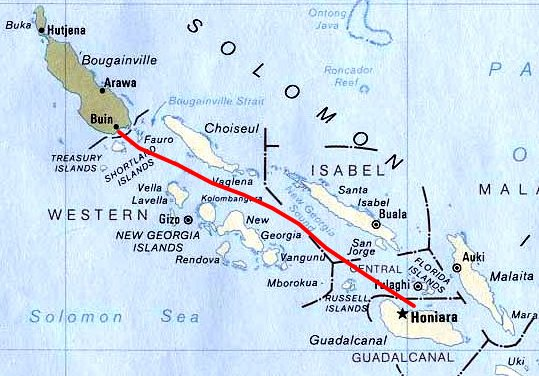
Tokyo Express Slot

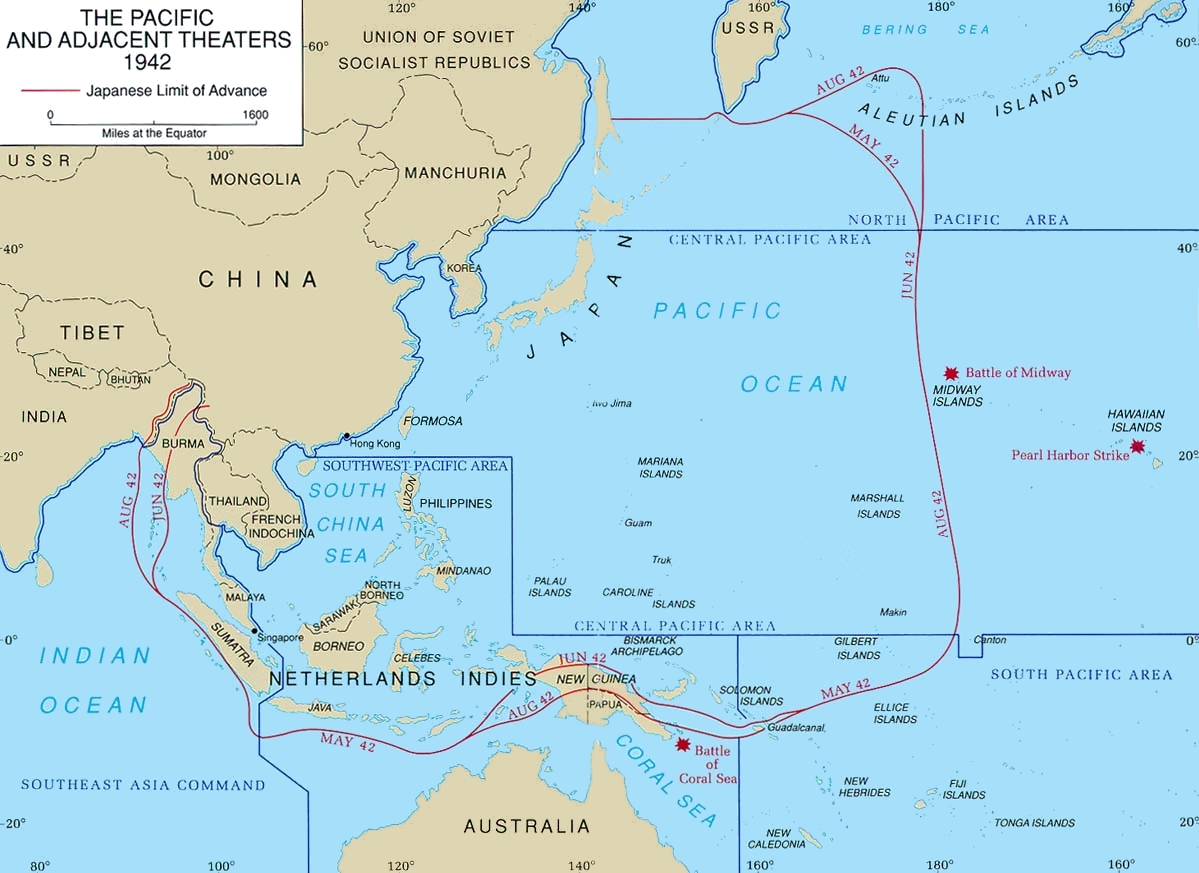
Pacific War Theater Areas map 1942, Pacific Ocean Areas

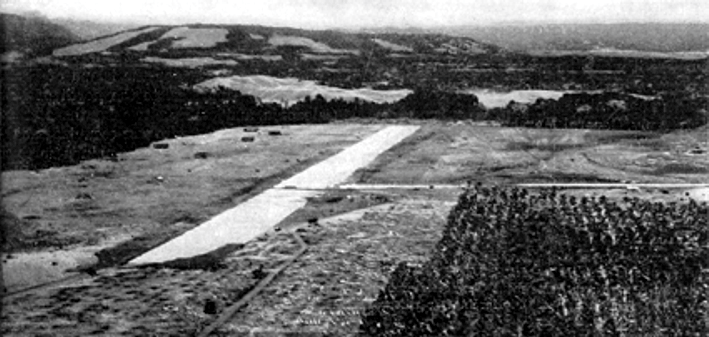
The airfield at Lunga Point on Guadalcanal under construction by Japanese and conscripted Korean laborers in July 1942

Routes of Allied amphibious forces for landings on Guadalcanal and Tulagi, 7 August 1942

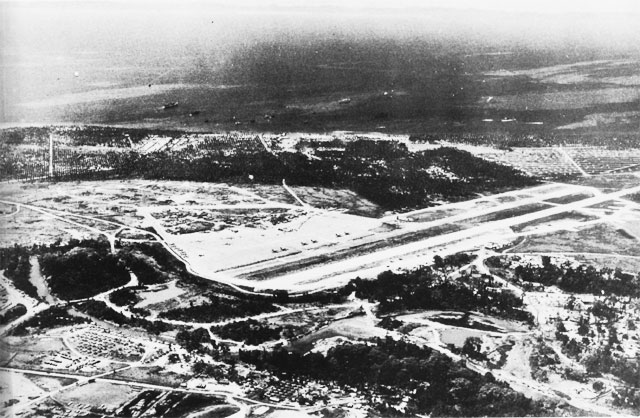
Henderson Field in 1944

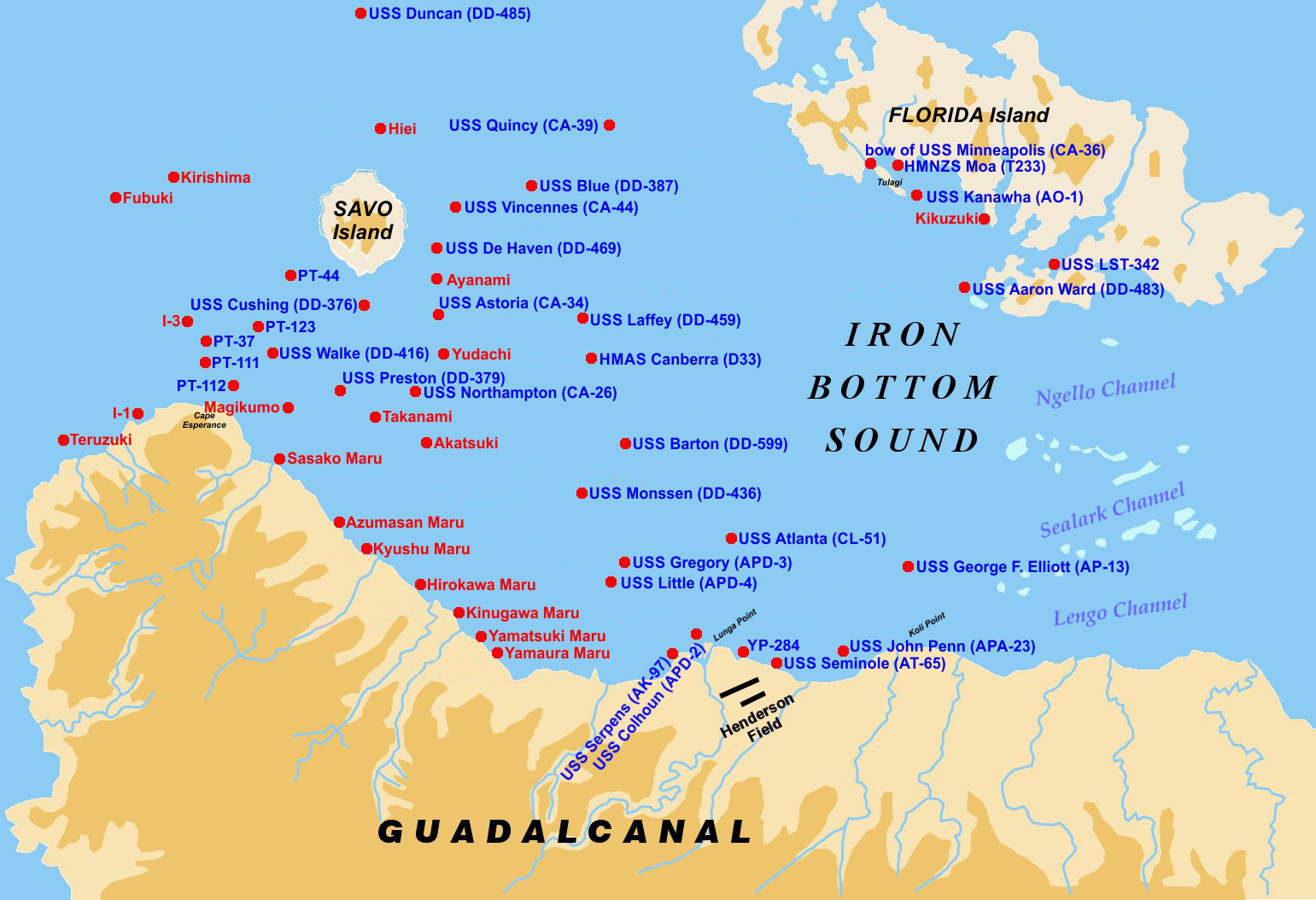
Shipwrecks in Ironbottom Sound, Solomon Islands

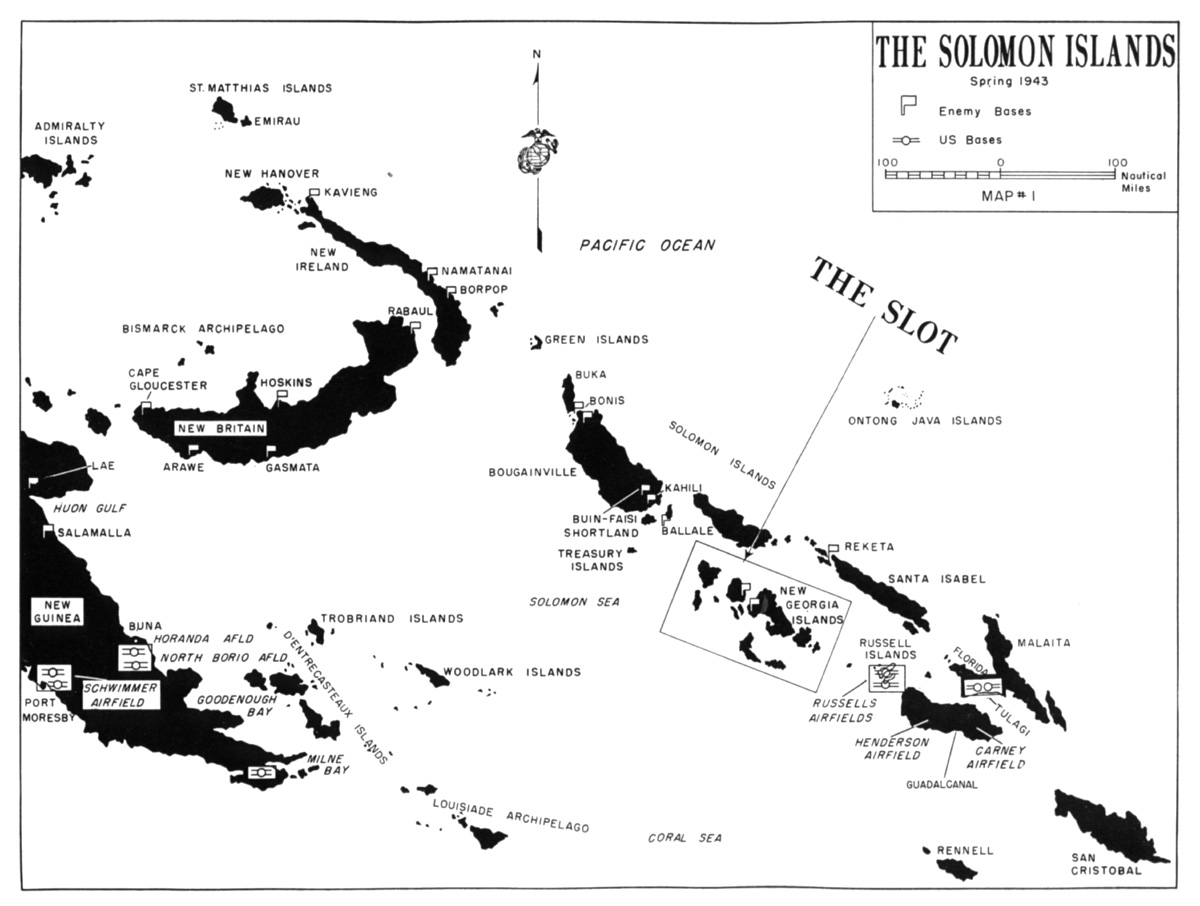
Solomons New Georgia in Pacific War

Naval Base Banika Island

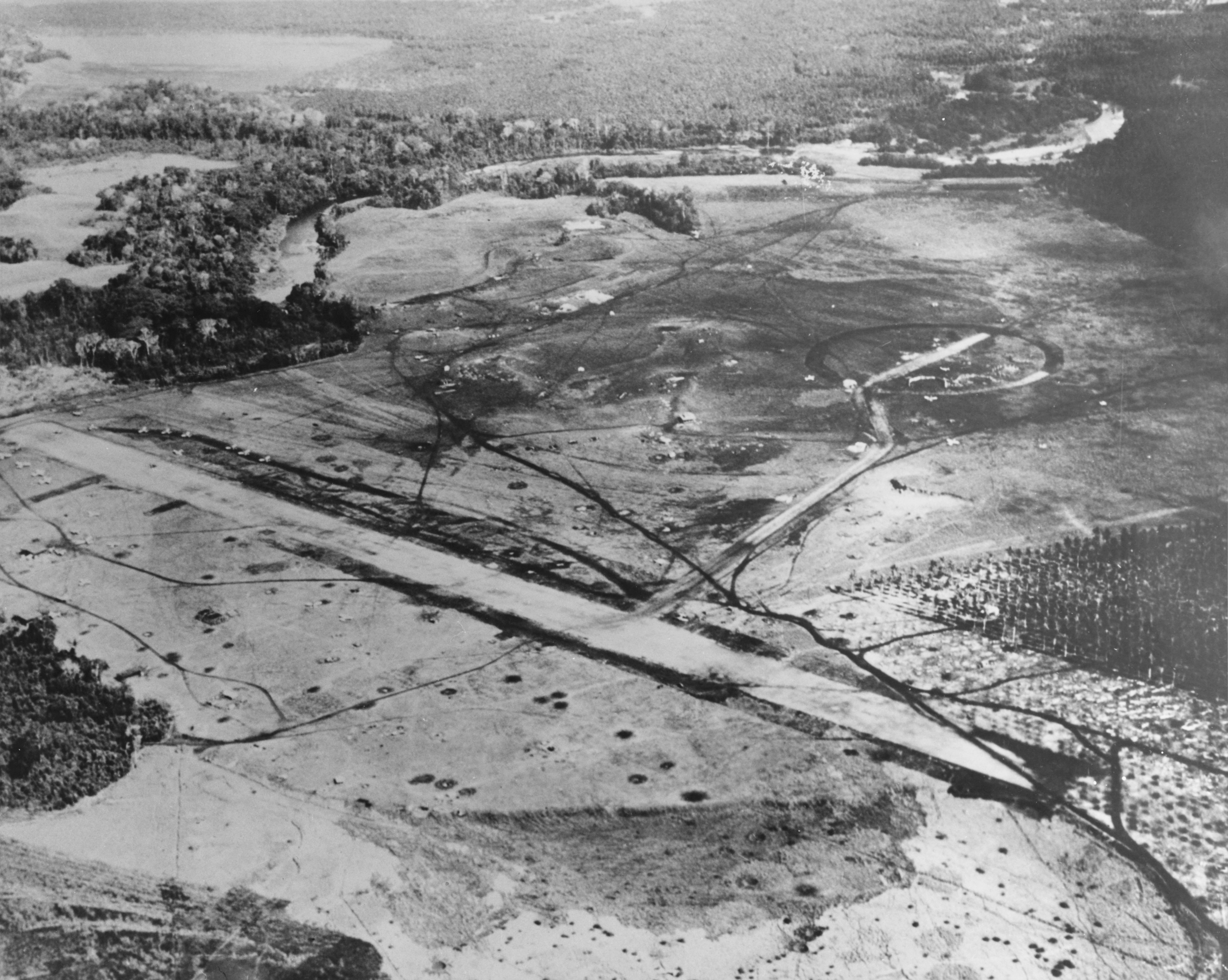
Aerial view of Henderson Field on Guadalcanal, late August 1942. The view looks northwest with the Lunga River and Lunga Point at the top of the image

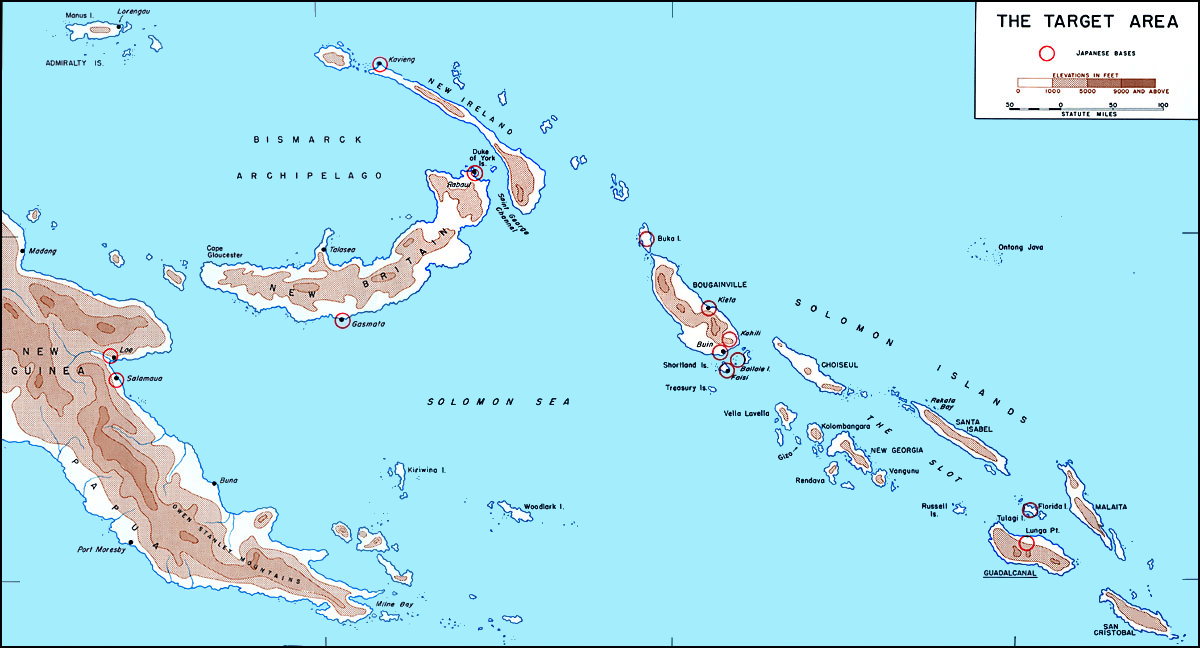
The Solomon Islands. "The Slot" (New Georgia Sound) runs down the center of the islands, from Bougainville and the Shortlands (center) to Guadalcanal (lower right)

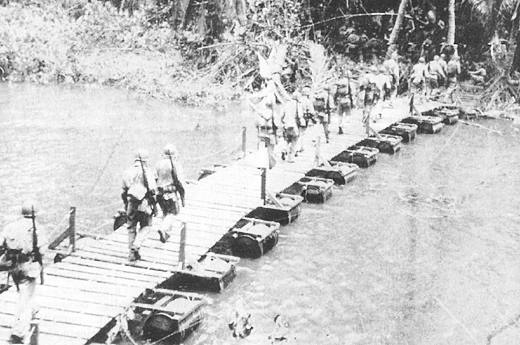
A U.S. Marine patrol crosses a pontoon bridge built by US Navy Seabees on the Lunga River in 1942

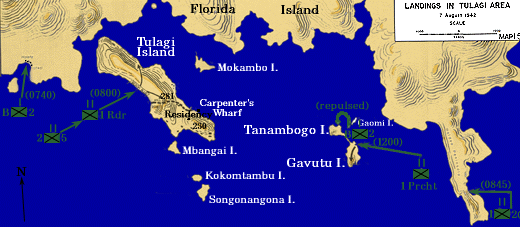
Map Tulagi-Gavutu-Tanambogo from August 7, 1942

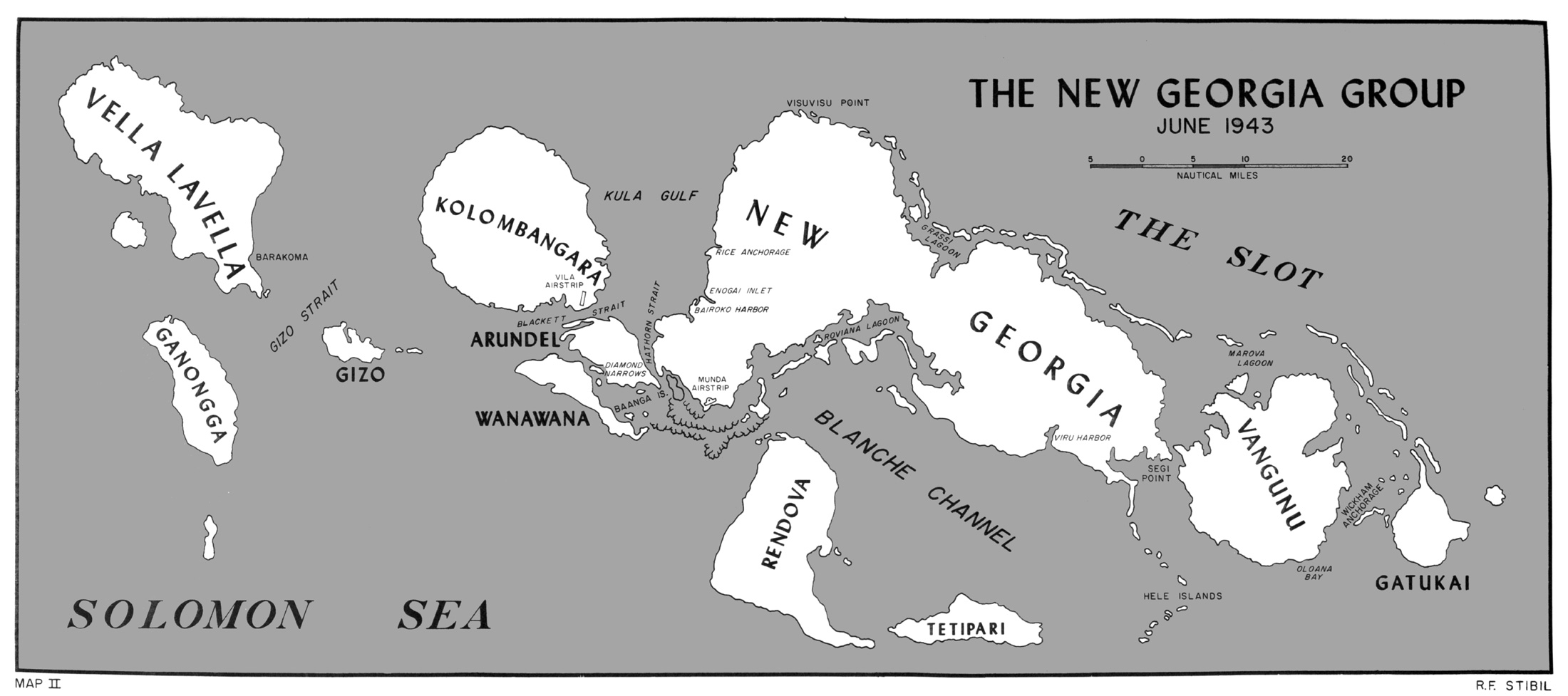
The New Georgia group of islands

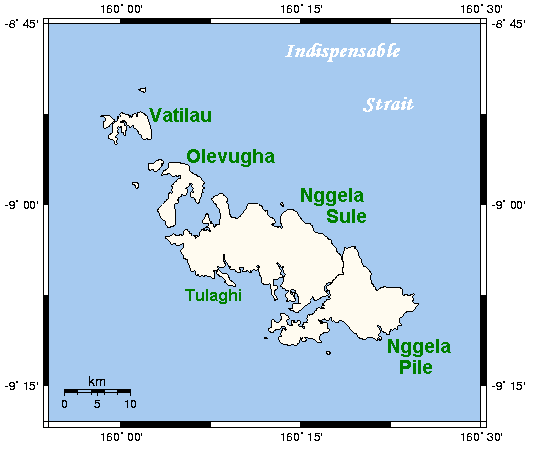
Map Nggela Islands in Solomons

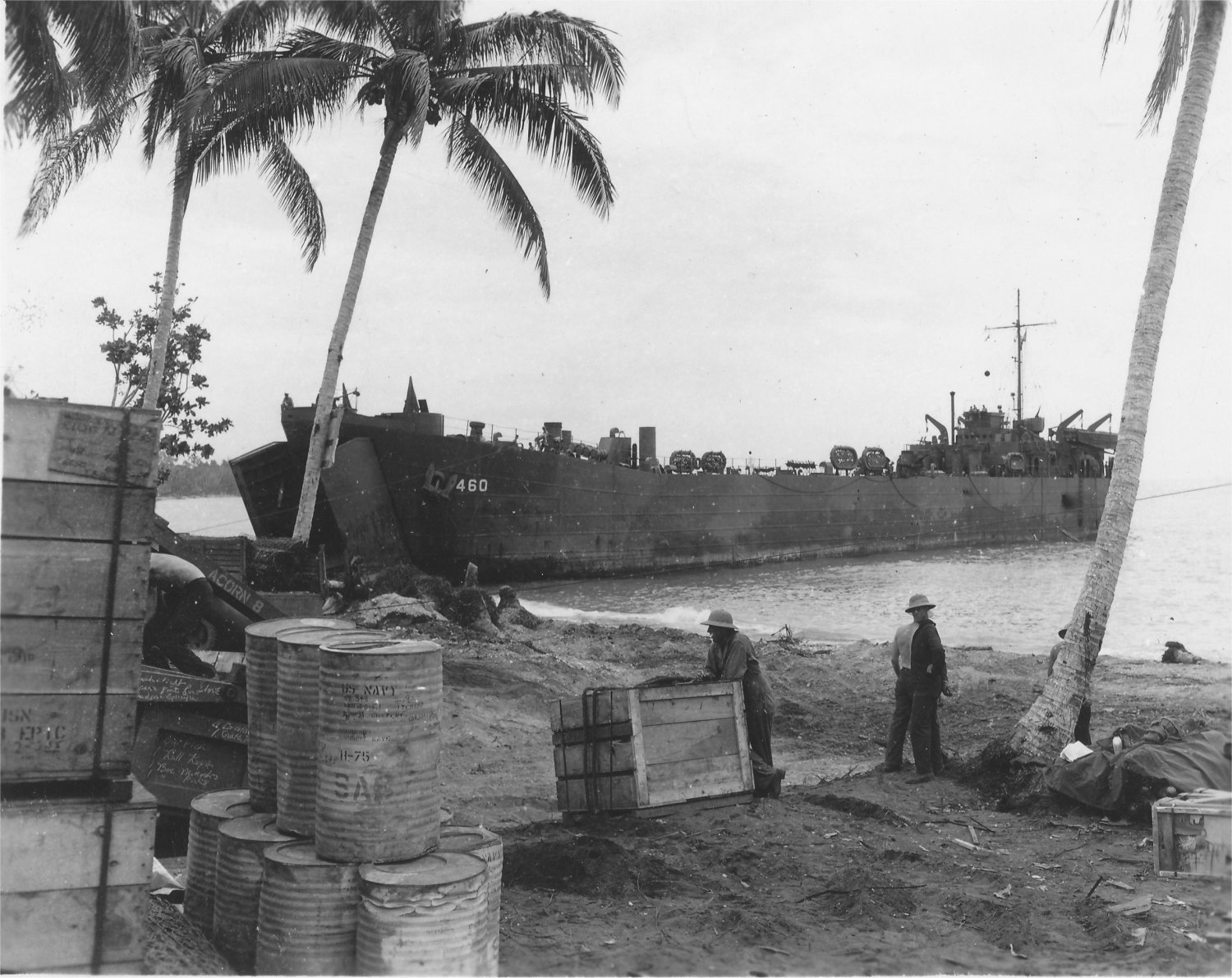
US Navy USS LST-460 unloading supplies at Naval Base Guadalcanal on 23 July 1943

South Pacific islands in 1945

== See also ==
- US Naval Advance Bases
- Battle of the Eastern Solomons
- Japanese occupation of the Solomon Islands
- Naval Battle of Guadalcanal
- Invasion of Tulagi (May 1942)
- Battle of Savo Island
- Eastern Solomons order of battle
- Battle of the Tenaru
- Battle of Tassafaronga
- Bougainville campaign
- US Naval Base New Zealand
- Washing Machine Charlie
