= Reko =

- Village
- Location on Savo Island
- Coordinates: 9°9′43″S 159°48′27″E
- Country: Solomon Islands
- Province: Central Province
- Island: Savo Island
- Time zone: UTC+11 (UTC)

Reko is a village on the southwestern coast of Savo Island, Central Province, Solomon Islands. The Ocean Express stops off at Reko between Honiara and Tulagi.
