= Kusini =

- Village
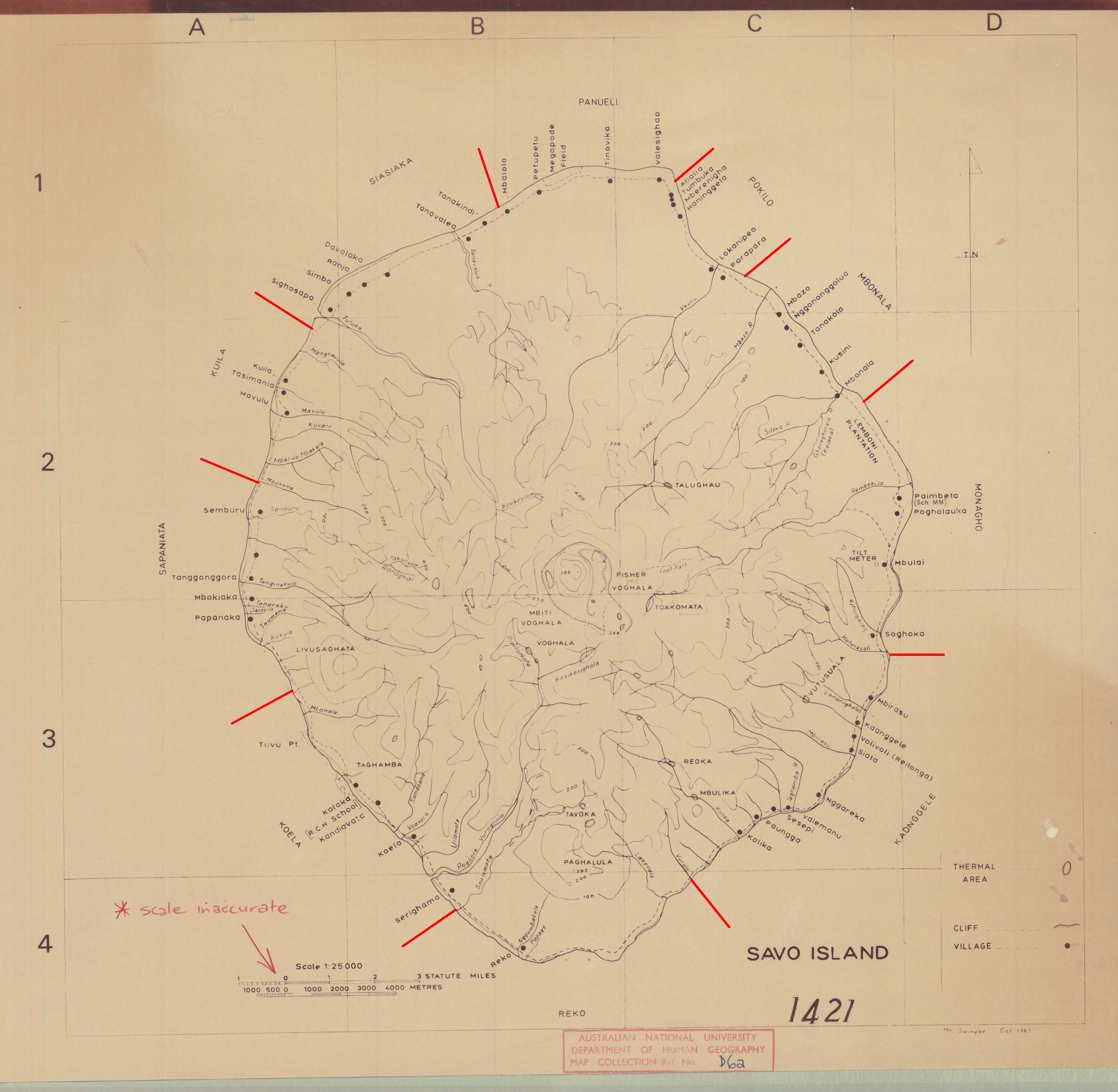

- Location on Savo Island
- Coordinates: 9°6′55″S 159°49′54″E
- Country: Solomon Islands
- Province: Central Province
- Island: Savo Island
- Time zone: UTC+11 (UTC)

Kusini is a village on the eastern coast of Savo Island, Central Province, Solomon Islands. It is part of the traditional district of Mbonala, and is located between the larger villages of Mbonala and Tanakola, which are a few hundred meters southeast and northwest, respectively.
