= Aeaun =

Aeaun Island
- Location in the Solomon Islands
- Coordinates: 008°57′35″S 159°10′22″E
- Country: Solomon Islands
- Province: Central Province
- Island group: Nggela Islands Group

Aeaun is a small island in the Russell Islands, Solomon Islands; it is located in the Central Province. It is the northernmost islet of the Russell Islands, located on the coral reef north of the group's main island Pavuvu.

There is substantial reef growth near Aeaun.
