= Laovavasa =

- Village
- Location in Guadalcanal
- Coordinates: 9°16′57″S 159°38′23″E
- Country: Solomon Islands
- Province: Guadalcanal
- Island: Guadalcanal
- Time zone: UTC+11 (UTC)

Laovavasa is a village, just south of Veralevuha on the northwest coast of Guadalcanal, Solomon Islands. It is located 47.3 kilometres (29.4 mi) by road northwest of Honiara. The population is reportedly entirely Anglican.
