= Veralevuha =

- Village
- Location in Guadalcanal
- Coordinates: 9°16′32″S 159°38′53″E
- Country: Solomon Islands
- Province: Guadalcanal
- Island: Guadalcanal
- Time zone: UTC+11 (UTC)

Veralevuha is a village, just south of Kokamau on the northwest coast of Guadalcanal, Solomon Islands. It is located 46.2 kilometres (28.7 mi) by road northwest of Honiara.
