= Naval Base Banika Island =

Major World War 2 base in Solomon Islands

- Location in the Solomon Islands
- Coordinates: 009°05′52.8″S 159°11′38.4″E
- Country: Russell Islands in Solomon Islands
- Province: Central Province
- Naval Base: United States Navy
- Established Closed: May 15, 1943; June 1945

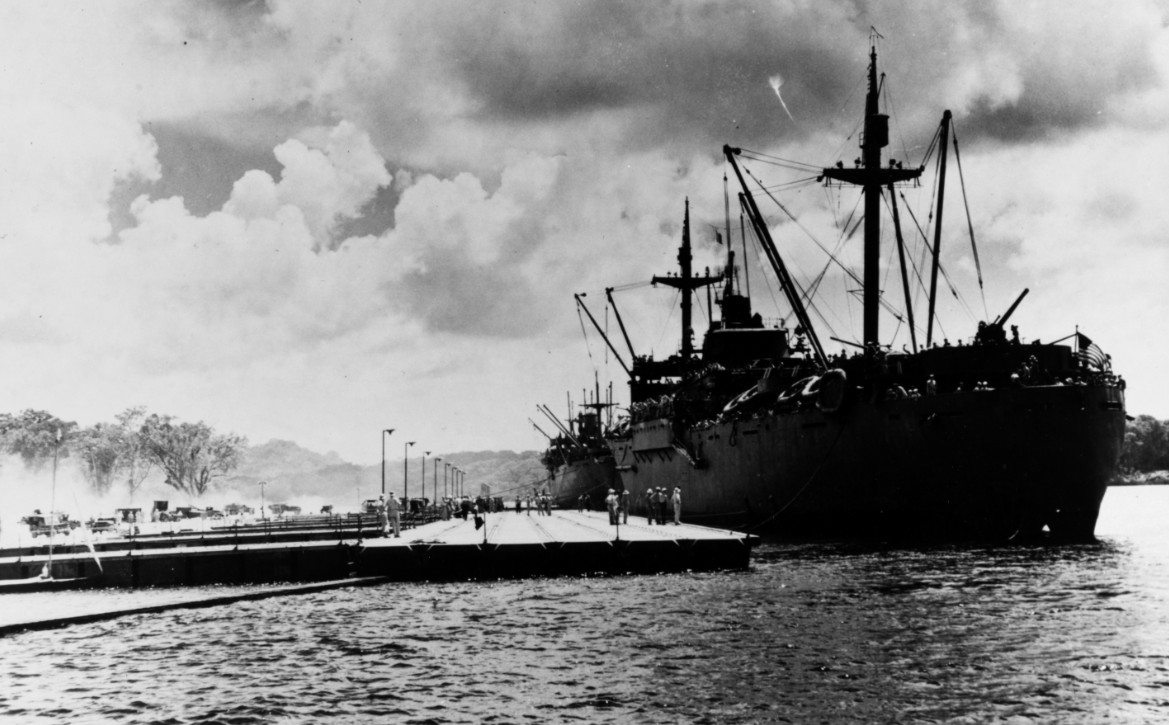
Pontoon dock at Naval Base Banika Island

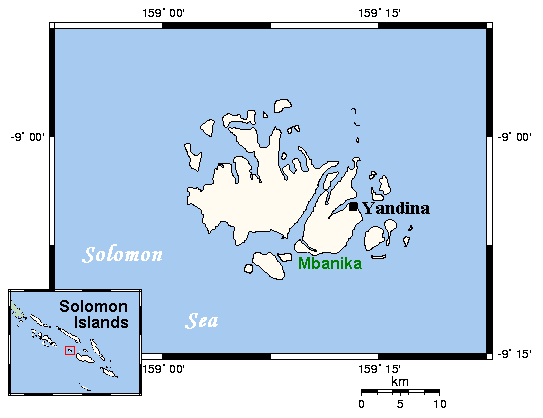
Map of Russell Islands and Banika Island

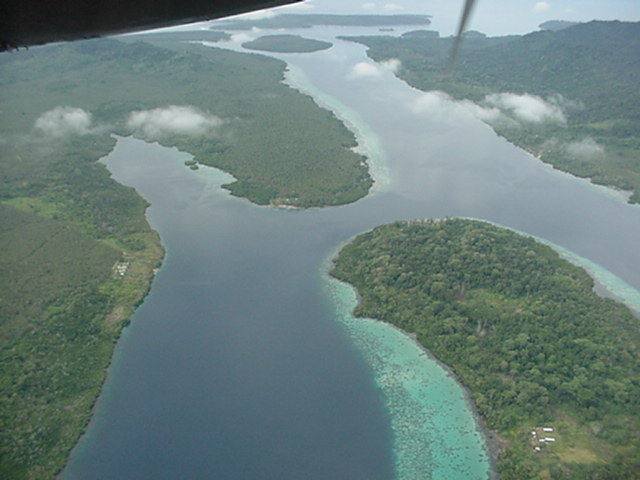
Banika Island's Sunlight Channel site of the Renard Sound Seaplane Base. Banika Island on the left and Pavuvu Island on right

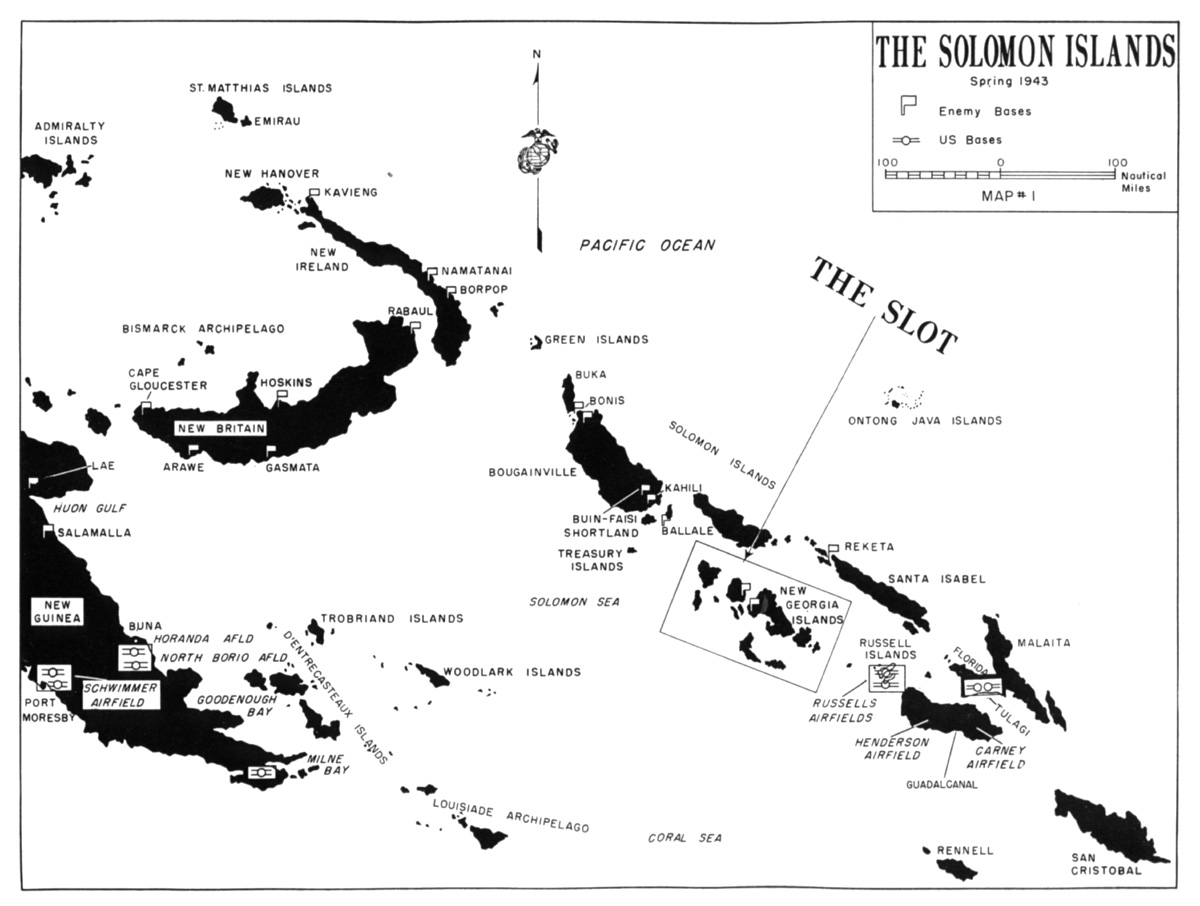
Map of Russell Islands in the Pacific

Naval Base Banika Island was a United States Navy base built during World War II on Mbanika Island in the Russell Islands, part of the Solomon Islands. A larger supply depot was built to support the ships fighting in the Pacific War. Also built were a repair base for landing craft, PT boats, and other boats. Banika Island offered excellent fleet anchorage. Banika Island was taken during the Solomon Islands campaign. Also at the base was built the Renard Sound Seaplane Base.

== History ==
US Navy Seabee Construction Battalions built the base starting in February 1943. Seabee 33rd Battalion, 35th Battalion and other Construction Battalions built the Naval Base and much of the airfields on Banika Island. Enemy planes bombed one of the Naval Base Banika Island's tank farms on June 25, 1943. One 1,000-barrel tank was destroyed by fire. Three had shrapnel damage. The pipelines to the port and airfields were damaged. It took the Seabees five days to repair the damages. The airfields remain open during the repair work. In all air attacks, four Seabees were killed. A pontoon bridge was built from Banika Island's Renard Sound to Pavuvu Island. On Pavuvu Island a barge landing dock was built and a small rest and relaxation base. The complete base was completed by November 1943. In the fall of 1943, the port was turned over for operation to the 6th Seabee Battalion and 9th Special Battalion. Operations were turned over to the 11th Battalion and the 12th Special Battalion in February 1944. The 93rd Battalion built Naval Mobile Hospital - MOB 10 with 1300-beds. A pontoon assembly depot was built, it took a lot less space in the ships to transport the pontoons in flat parts. The pontoon assembly depot was run by the 20th Battalion - PAD 2. Seabee built two airfields on the island Banika Field, used by US Navy, United States Army Air Forces (USAAF) and United States Marine Corps and Renard Field. By February 1945 Naval Base Banika Island was no longer in the front line of action and parts of the base were packed up and sent to move Advance Bases. Naval Mobile Hospital - MOB 10 was one of the first units to be shipped out. Much of the base was shipped over a four-month span. The base was closed and abandoned after the war.

== Bases and facilities ==
- 300-foot (91 m) pier
- Radar station
- Naval hospital
- Naval hospital dispensary
- Naval Mobile Hospital - MOB 10
- Fleet Post Office FPO# 60 SF Russell Islands
- Naval Recovery hospital
- Naval training center
- Supply Depot
- Seabee Camp
- Seabee depot - Advanced Base Construction Depot (ABCD)
- Seabee sawmill
- Repair Depot
- Coral quarry
- Repair base camp, barracks and mess hall
- Power plant
- PT boat Base
- Machine shops
- Ammunition depot
- Aviation gasoline Tank farm
- Blue Beach landing mats for LST ships and LCT craft
- Yellow Beach landing mats
- Two-lane coral road around Banika Island (connect beaches to port)
- Tillotson Cove, two 432-foot (132 m) pontoon docks
- Pontoon assembly depot
- Pavuvu Island a barge landing dock
- VMF -121 and VMF(N)-531 United States Marine Corps unit camp

== Airfields ==
The airfields were used to attack the Empire of Japan on New Georgia and Munda.

- Banika Field, used by US Navy for Interstate TDR United States Army Air Forces (USAAF) and United States Marine Corps
- Renard Field used by USAAF and US Navy VB-140 and VB-148, both with Lockheed Ventura PV-1

=== Renard Sound Seaplane Base ===
Near Banika Field, in the channel to the east of the runway, the US Navy operated the Renard Sound Seaplane Base. The Base was at 9.08108°S 159.207813°E.

== Seabee units ==
Seabee units that spent time at Naval Base Banika Island:

- 33rd Battalion
- 35th Battalion
- 93rd Battalion
- 6th Seabee Battalion
- 9th Special Battalions
- 20th Battalion
- 24th Battalion
- 35th Battalion
- 36th Battalion
- 87th Battalion
- 11th Battalion
- 12th Special Battalion
- CBMU 503
- CBMU 571
- CBMU 572
- CBMU 573
- CBMU 501
- CBMU 580
- CBMU 503
- CBMU 550
- ACORN 15
- Bobcat 15
- Bobcat 24
- Bobcat 33
- Bobcat 36
- PAD 2
- 1054 CBD

== See also ==
- US Naval Base Solomons
- New Guinea campaign
- New Britain campaign
- US Naval Advance Bases
