= Yandina =

Yandina may refer to:

- Yandina, Queensland, Australia
- Yandina, Solomon Islands, in the Russell Islands
