= Banika Field =

- IATA: none; ICAO: none

Summary
- Location: Mbanika, Solomon Islands
- Coordinates: 9.098000°S 159.194000°E

Map
- Banika Field in Solomon Islands

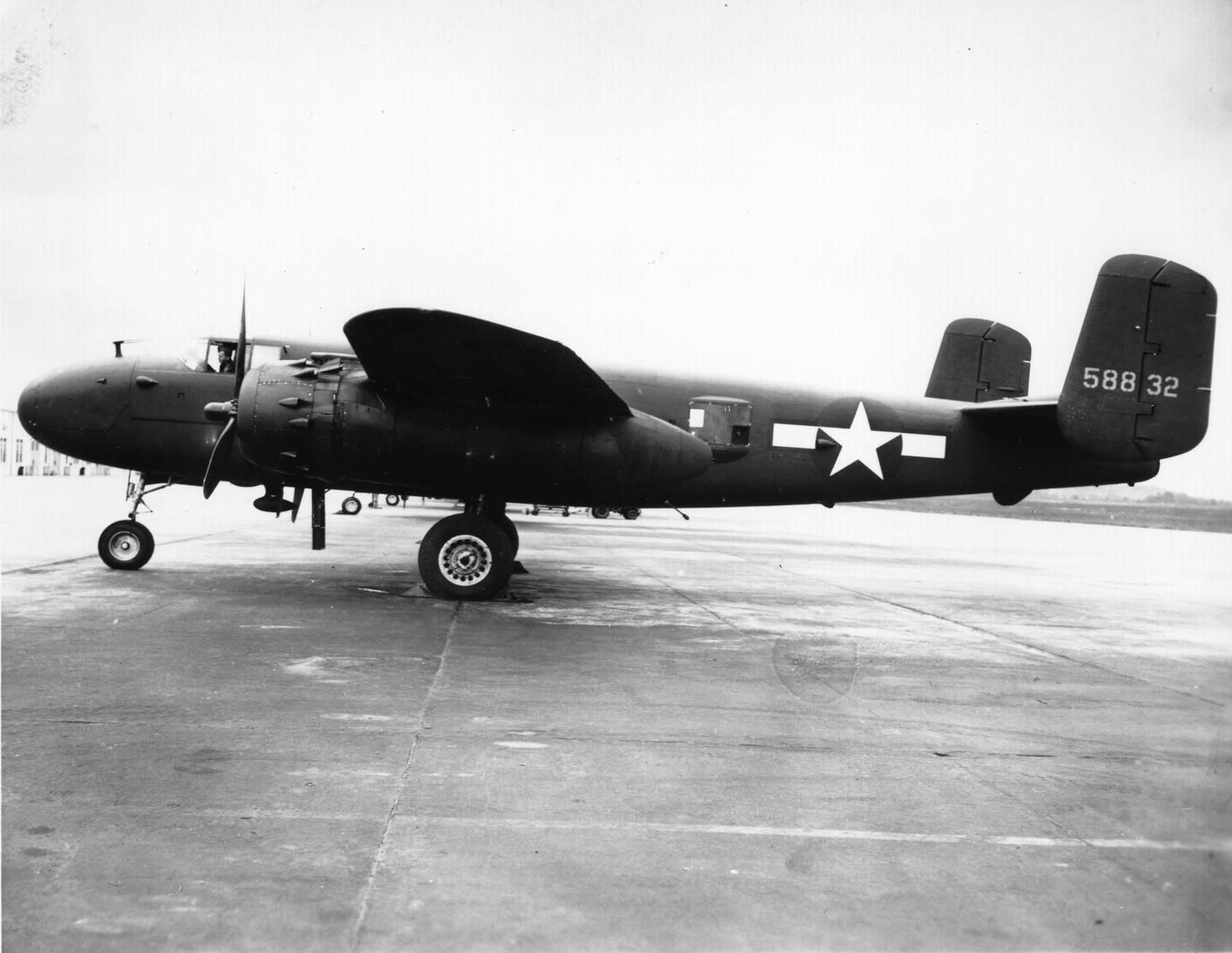
North American B-25 Mitchell - B-25

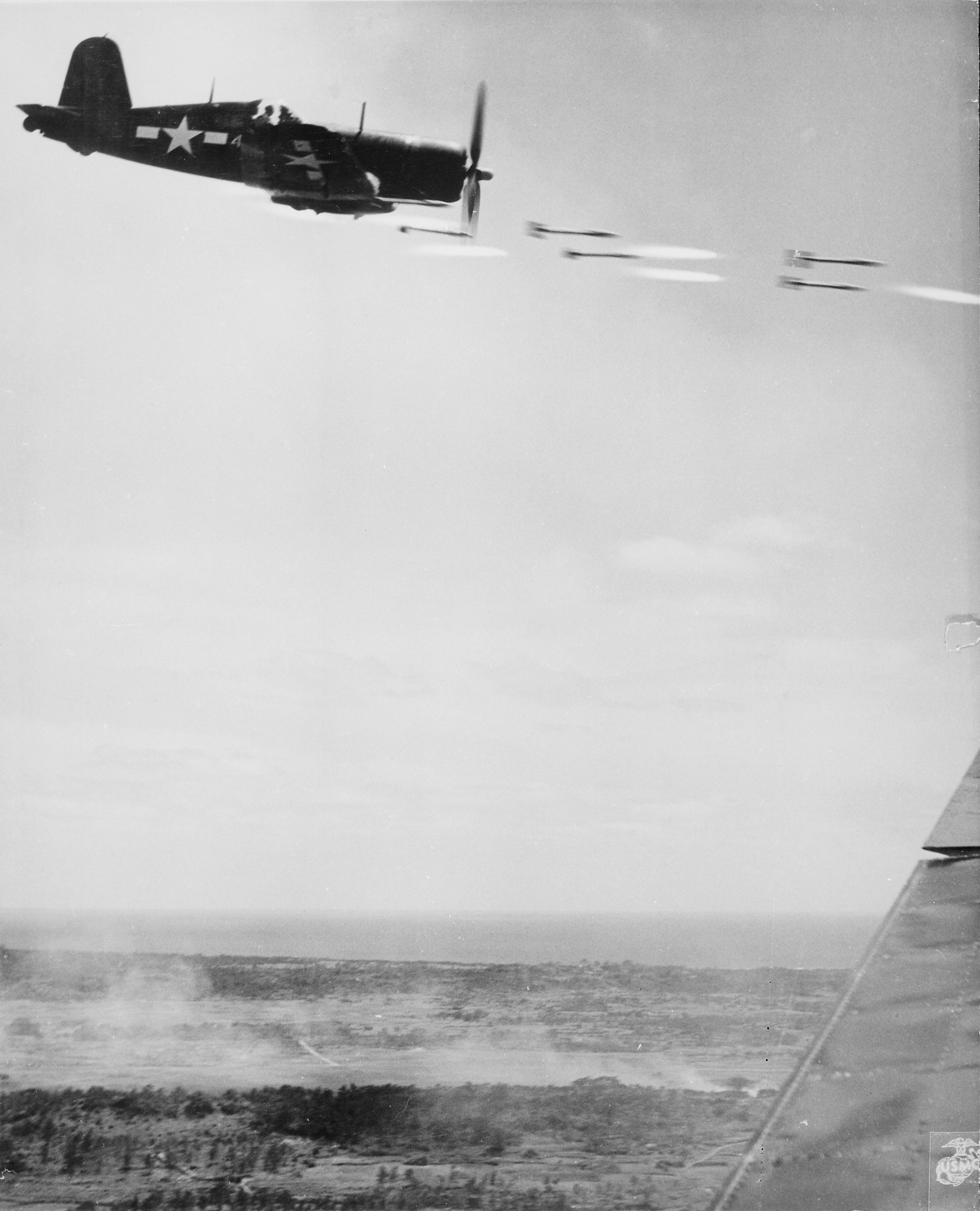
Vought F4U Corsair - F4U

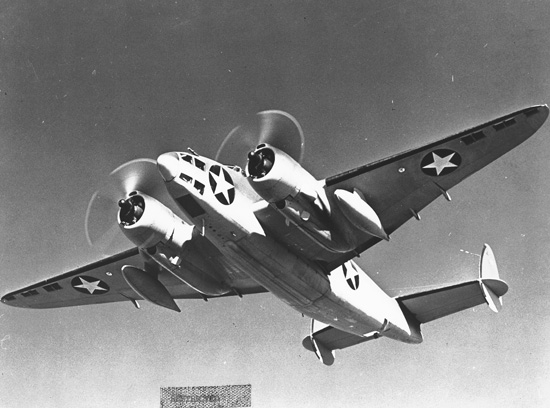
Lockheed Ventura PV-1

Banika Field was a World War II airfield on Mbanika in the Russell Islands in the Solomon Islands. Banika Field was built and supported by Naval Base Banika Island.

== History ==
A US Navy Seebee Naval Construction Battalion began construction for two airfields on Banika Island in February 1943. Renard Field, also called South Field, Yandina, was built is still in use as Yandina Airport. Nearby Banika Field, also called North Field and Sunlight Field was built. Banika Field had a single coral 4,700-foot by 150-foot runway built for light bombers and fighter planes. Banika Field was completed in June 1943. After the war, Banika Field was abandoned.

United States Army Air Forces units operating from the base included:

- Flying North American B-25 Mitchells
- 2nd BG, HQ (B-25]) October 22, 1943–Aug 7, 44 Hollandia
- 42nd BG, 390th BS (B-25C) October 21-43–August 22, 1944
- 42nd BG, 75th BS (B-25) October 21, 1943–Jan 20, 1944
- 42nd BG, 390th BS (B-25) October 22, 1943–Aug 7, 1944
- 42nd BG, 69th BS (B-25) November 10, 1943–February 19, 1944

US Navy operating from the base included:

- Special Task Air Group One (STAG-1) (TDR-1 Attack Drone)
- Base LVT Repair Component E20 #1

United States Marine Corps (USMC)

- MAG-21 HQ March 1943 - ?
- VMF-124 (Vought F4U Corsair-F4U) departed June 17, 1943
- VMF-213 (F4U) June 17, 1943–December 9, 1943
- VMF-214 (F4U) July 21, 1943–September 17, 1943
- VMF(N)-531 (Lockheed Ventura PV-1) September 11, 1943 - ?
- VMSB-144 (Douglas SBD Dauntless SBD) June 25, 1943–July 30, 1943

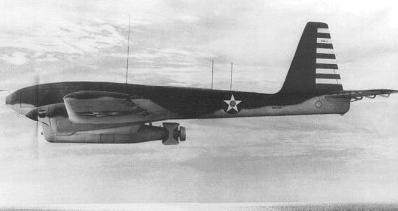
Interstate TDR-1

== Interstate TDR ==
The US Navy used Banika Field to test and operated the new Interstate TDR early Unmanned combat aerial vehicle, at that time called a flying bomb. The Interstate TDR had one 2,000-pound (910 kg) bomb or one aerial torpedo and was remotely controlled via radio. At Banika Field was the first use of the unit in a combat zone. At Banika Field top secret combat test were done. Test were done in June 1944 with troops from Special Task Air Group 1 (STAG-1). The head of the test was Commanding Officer (C. O.) Captain Robert F. Jones.

== Renard Sound Seaplane Base ==
Near Banika Field, in the channel to the east of the runway, the US Navy operated the Renard Sound Seaplane Base. The Base was at 9.08108°S 159.207813°E

== See also ==
- US Naval Advance Bases
- Naval Base Brisbane
