= Chapuru =

- Village
- Location in Guadalcanal
- Coordinates: 9°15′26″S 159°43′13″E
- Country: Solomon Islands
- Province: Guadalcanal
- Island: Guadalcanal
- Time zone: UTC+11 (UTC)

Chapuru is a village on the northwest coast of Guadalcanal, Solomon Islands. It is located 37.5 kilometres (23.3 mi) by road northwest of Honiara.
