= Chahoga =

- Village
- Location in Guadalcanal
- Coordinates: 9°15′8″S 159°41′49″E
- Country: Solomon Islands
- Province: Guadalcanal
- Island: Guadalcanal
- Time zone: UTC+11 (UTC)

Chahoga is a village on the northwest coast of Guadalcanal, Solomon Islands. It is located 38 kilometres (24 mi) by road northwest of Honiara.
