= Operation Cleanslate =

Coordinates: 9.07°S 159.15°E

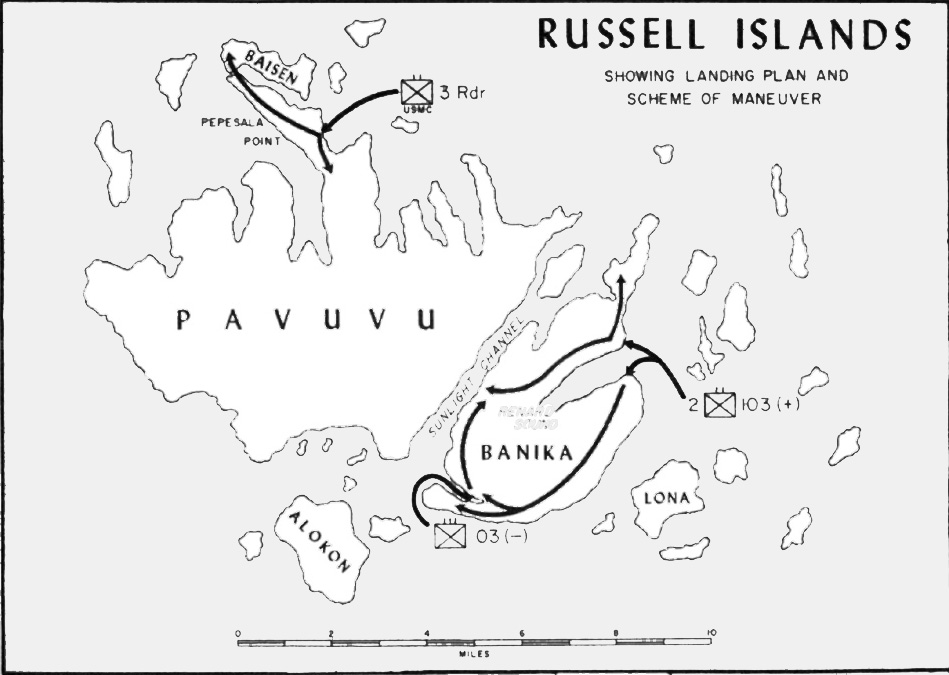
Landing Plan of Operation Cleanslate

During World War II, Operation Cleanslate was the occupation of Russell Islands about sixty miles northwest of Guadalcanal by the United States on 21 February 1943. The Japanese had captured the islands in January 1943 but abandoned them after only two weeks. A coastwatcher reported on 11 February that Japanese forces had left the islands.

== Background ==
Located 25 miles from Guadalcanal, Russell Islands had no part in the operations there, until occupied by Japanese forces in January 1943, to use them as a staging post for the evacuation of Guadalcanal. Reportedly, their presence there was very short-lived, and on 11 February they had left the islands.

After securing Guadalcanal, Admiral William Halsey Jr. ordered the occupation of the Russells, both to develop the islands for future operations and to prevent the Japanese from using them against American forces.

== Landings ==
Forces assigned to take the islands comprised around 10,000 men, including the 43rd Army Division and the 3rd Marine Raider Battalion. Though the target was undefended, there was still some risk of being discovered and attacked while en route, or a landing of enemy forces to dispute the islands. Neither of the possible threats materialised, so the invasion was over in a mere six hours, without engaging the enemy.

== Aftermath ==
The base, Naval Base Banika Island, was attacked after the invasion by Japanese planes, from March to July 1943, but the raids could not prevent the building of a large base, with two airfields, a radar station and diverse naval facilities. The base was used in the invasions of New Georgia, Northern Solomon Islands and Bismarck Islands. It was still in operation at the time of the landings in Okinawa, but it was already being dismantled.
