= Sandfly/Buenavista =

Coordinates: 9°00′S 160°10′E

- Interactive map of Sandfly/Buenavista
- Country: Solomon Islands
- Province: Central
- Island group: Nggela (Florida) Islands

Sandfly/Buenavista is a ward in Central Province of Solomon Islands.
