= Water Pump (Honiara) =

- Suburb
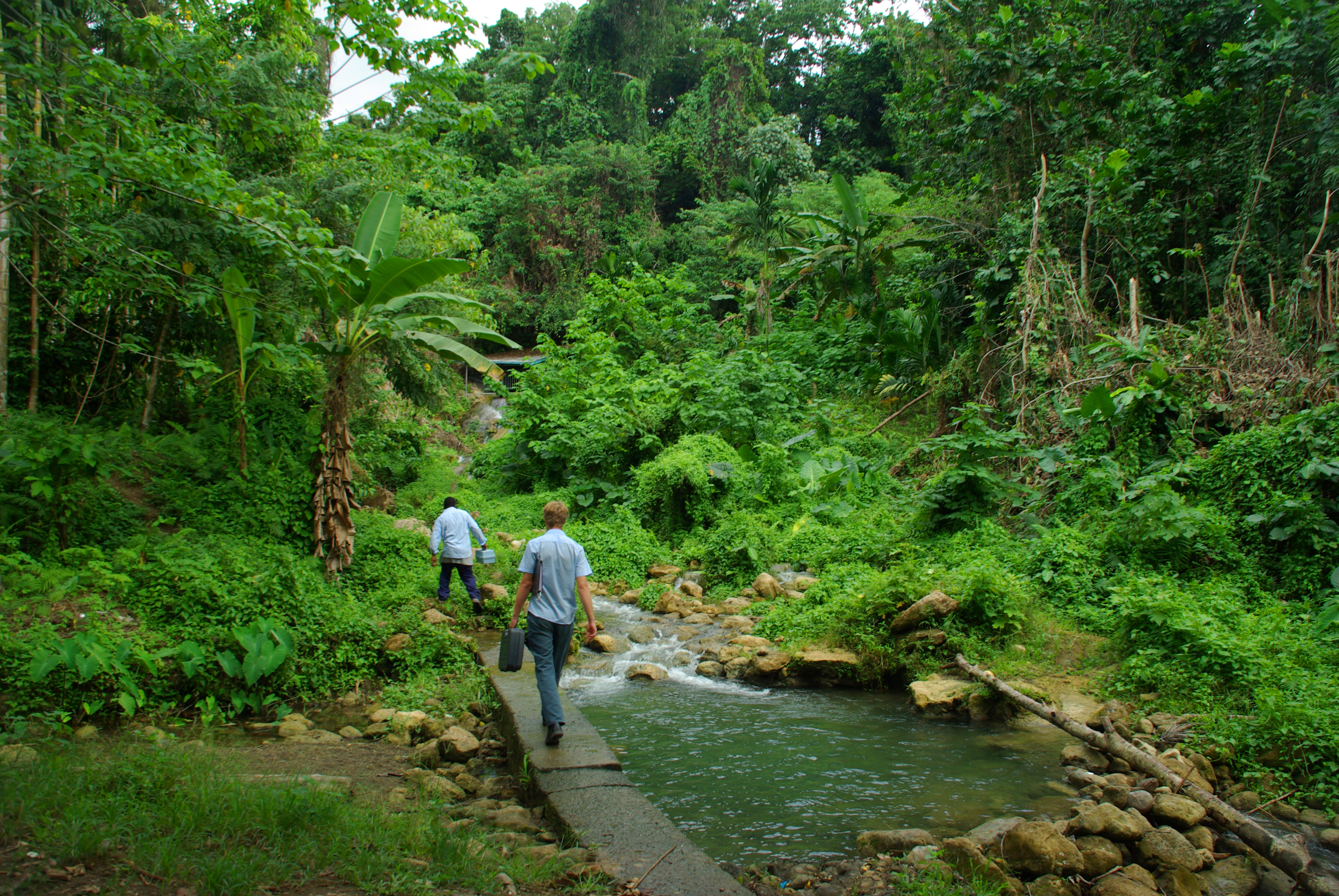
- Kongulai river at the water source.

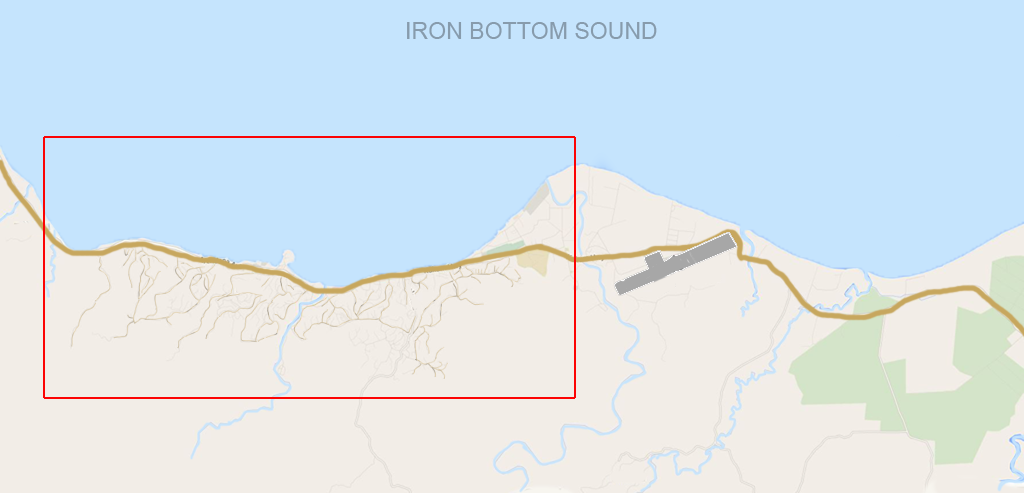
- Location in Honiara (Council boundary-red box)
- Coordinates: 9°29′S 159°54′E
- Country: Solomon Islands
- Province: Honiara Town
- Island: Guadalcanal
- Elevation: 29 m (95 ft)
- Time zone: UTC+11 (UTC)

Water Pump is a community in Honiara, Solomon Islands located about 5 kilometres (3.1 mi) West from the center of the city.

== Water Catchment ==
The Water Pump area also accommodates the Kovi & Kongulai water catchment area of 14 kilometres (8.7 mi) square which supplies water for Honiara from the Kovi and Kongulai rivers. The area consists of forest and surrounding watershed system. It is located in an undisturbed area within a unique terrain and landscape. The Kovi River is surrounded by riparian vegetation that includes mosses, herbs, ferns, palms and trees. The river is sourced from ground water that flows out of a limestone rock over a limestone substrate and patches of sand and pebbles before sinking into two caverns.

The area is managed by a land trustee who arrange payments to traditional landholders.

== See also ==
- Video of village (Vic Stefanu)
