= Mbanika =

Island in Solomon Islands

Mbanika Island
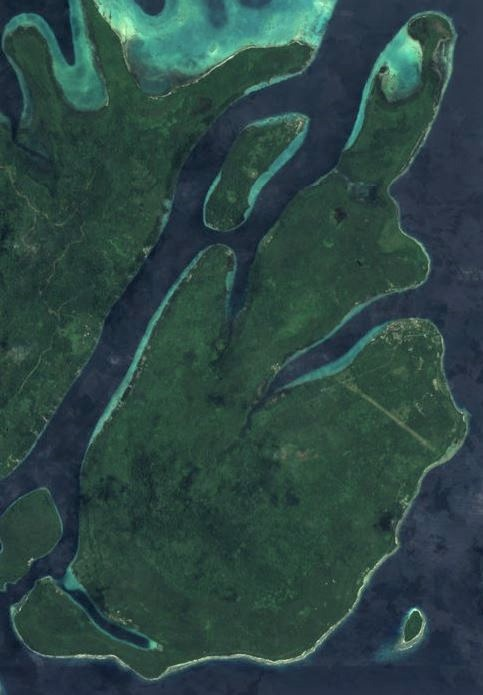
- Satellite image of Mbanika Island

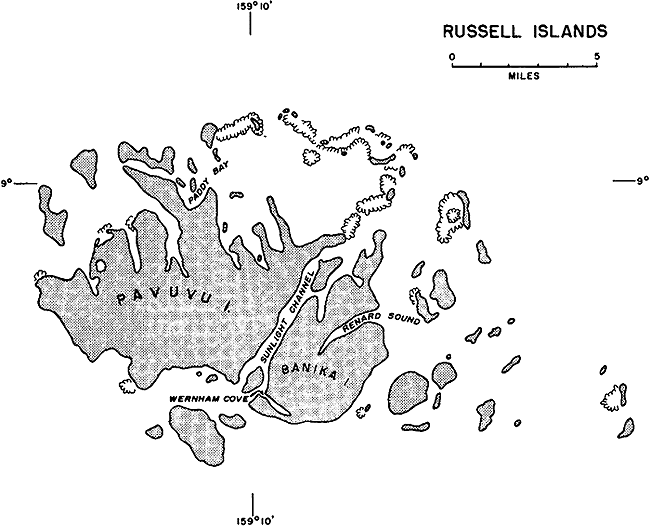
- Map of Russell Islands showing Mbanika (Banika) Island

- Location in the Solomon Islands

Geography
- Location: South Pacific Ocean
- Coordinates: 009°05′52.8″S 159°11′38.4″E
- Archipelago: Russell Islands

Administration
- Solomon Islands
- Province: Central Province
- Largest town: Yandina

Mbanika or Banika is an island in Solomon Islands; it is located in the Central Province and is the second largest of the Russell Islands Group. The principal settlement is Yandina.

As portrayed in episode four of the HBO miniseries, The Pacific, the American forces used the island—referred to in the show as "Banika"—as a hospital and R&R site, during World War II.

During World War II, the US built three bases on the island:

- Banika Field
- Renard Field
- Renard Sound Seaplane Base
