= Hularu =

- Village
- Location in Guadalcanal
- Coordinates: 9°32′25″S 159°38′27″E
- Country: Solomon Islands
- Province: Guadalcanal
- Island: Guadalcanal
- Time zone: UTC+11 (UTC)

Hularu is a village on the west coast of Guadalcanal, Solomon Islands. It is an isolated village, located beyond the extent of the Kukum Highway.
