= Kokamau =

- Village
- Location in Guadalcanal
- Coordinates: 9°16′23″S 159°39′12″E
- Country: Solomon Islands
- Province: Guadalcanal
- Island: Guadalcanal
- Time zone: UTC+11 (UTC)

Kokamau is a village on the northwest coast of Guadalcanal, Solomon Islands. It is located 45.2 kilometres (28.1 mi) by road northwest of Honiara.
