= Yandina, Solomon Islands =

Yandina
- Town
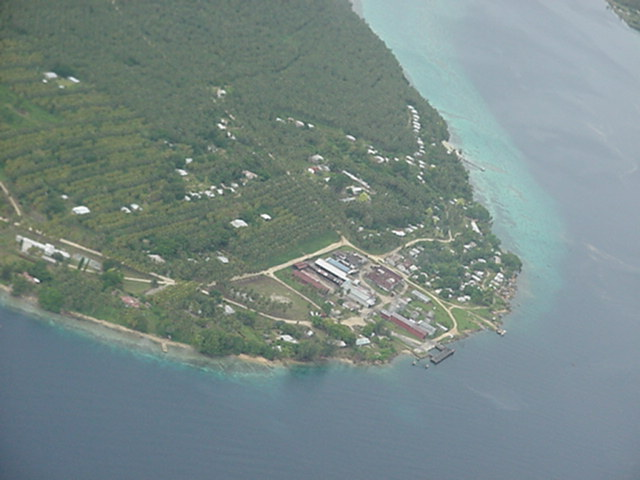
- Aerial view from the east

- Location
- Coordinates: 9°7′S 159°13′E
- Country: Solomon Islands
- Province: Central Province
- Island: Mbanika
- Time zone: UTC+11 (UTC)

Yandina is the principal town on Mbanika Island in the Russell Islands, located on the east coast of the island, in the Central Province of Solomon Islands. It is a port, and an airport (ICAO code: AGGY, IATA code: XYA). Yandina is the site of a copra and cocoa plantation and has basic services such as a store, post office, and rest house.

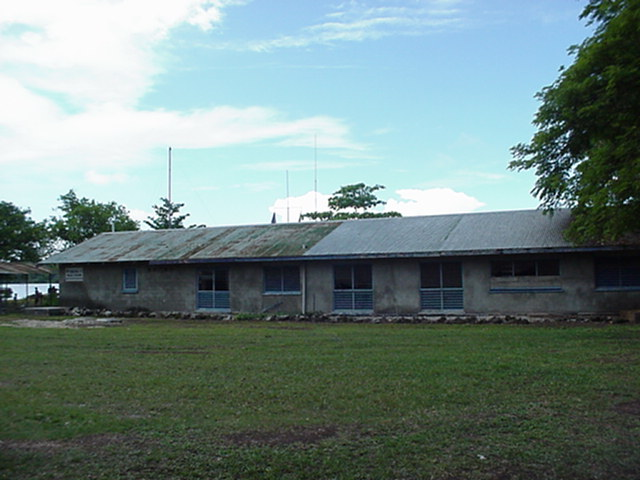
Yandina police station

One of the opening events of the 1998-2003 ethnic tensions between the Guale natives of Guadalcanal and Malaitan settlers occurred in Yandina, where a group of Guale men raided the armoury and stole high powered weapons and ammunition. The group involved became known as the Guadalcanal Revolutionary Army, and later as Isatabu Freedom Movement.

Yandina is the site of one of the RAMSI posts. Yandina is also known as a diving destination.

== Climate ==
Climate data for Yandina
Month	Jan	Feb	Mar	Apr	May	Jun	Jul	Aug	Sep	Oct	Nov	Dec	Year
Mean daily maximum °C (°F)	31 (88)	31 (88)	31 (87)	31 (88)	31 (87)	30 (86)	30 (86)	31 (87)	30 (86)	30 (86)	31 (87)	31 (88)	31 (87)
Mean daily minimum °C (°F)	24 (75)	24 (75)	23 (74)	23 (74)	23 (73)	24 (75)	23 (74)	24 (75)	24 (75)	23 (74)	24 (75)	24 (75)	24 (75)
Average precipitation mm (inches)	290 (11.4)	370 (14.6)	610 (24.1)	130 (5.2)	230 (9)	110 (4.5)	280 (11)	150 (6)	150 (5.8)	170 (6.8)	310 (12.4)	210 (8.4)	3,030 (119.1)
Source: Weatherbase
