= Central Province (Solomon Islands) =

Central Province Sentrol Provins (Pijin)
- Province
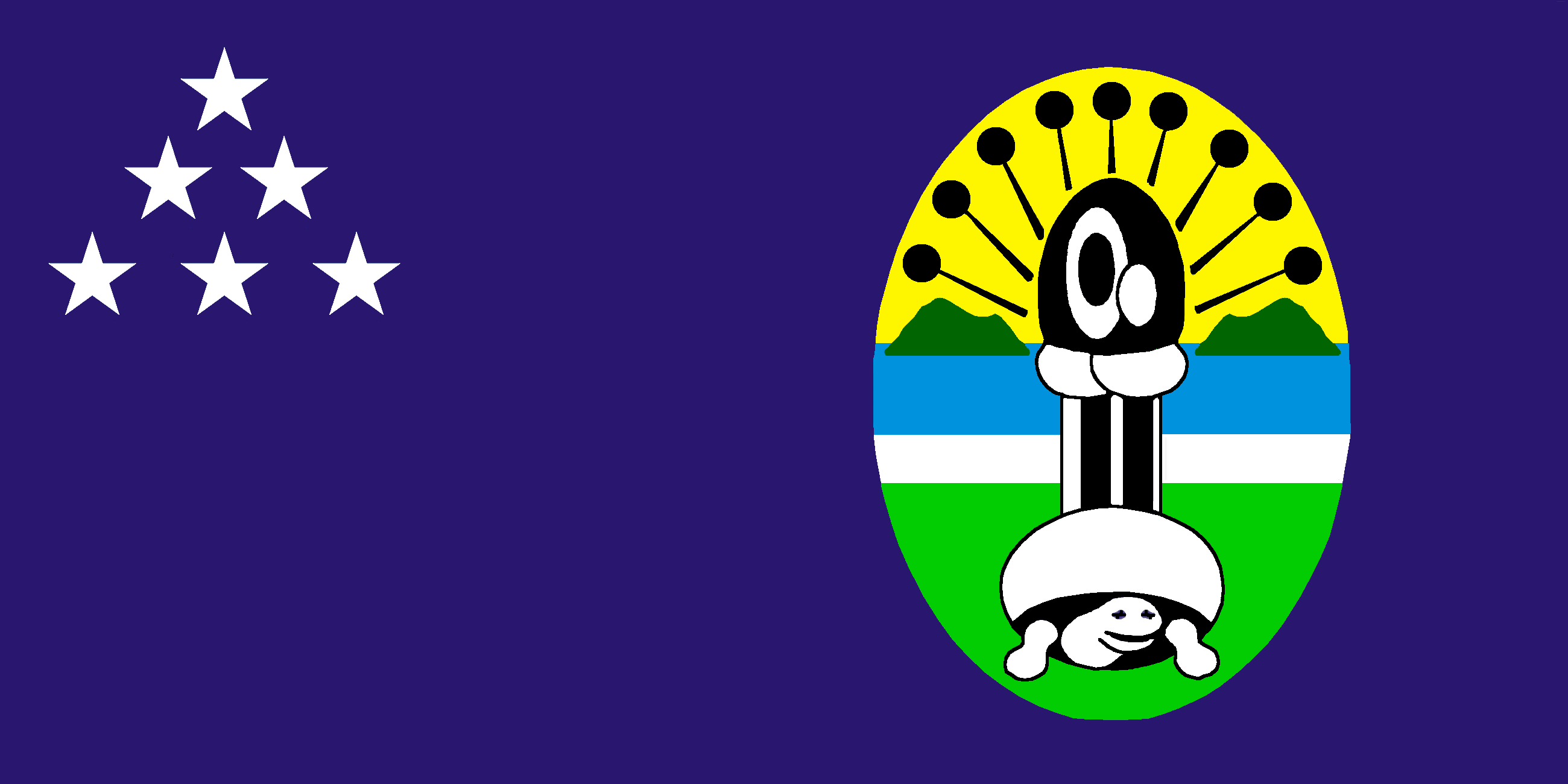
- Flag

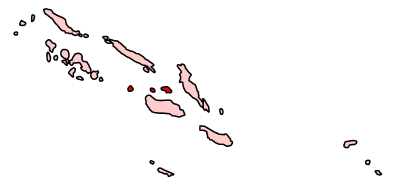
- Coordinates: 9°0′S 159°45′E
- Country: Solomon Islands
- Capital: Tulagi

Government
  - Premier: Hon. Kenneth Sagupari

Area
  - Total: 615 km^{2} (237 sq mi)

Population (2019 census)
  - Total: 30,318
  - Density: 49.3/km^{2} (128/sq mi)
- Time zone: UTC+11 (+11)
- ISO 3166 code: SB-CE

The Central Province is one of the provinces of Solomon Islands, covering the Russell Islands, Nggela Islands (Florida Islands) and Savo Island. Its area comprises 615 square kilometres (237 square miles) and had a population of 26,051 as of 2009, rising to 30,326 as of 2019. The provincial capital is Tulagi.

== World War II ==
The Battle of Tulagi and Gavutu–Tanambogo was a land battle of the Pacific campaign of World War II, between the forces of the Imperial Japanese Navy and Allied (mainly United States Marine Corps) ground forces. It took place 7–9 August 1942 on the Solomon Islands, during the initial Allied landings in the Guadalcanal campaign.

== Administrative divisions ==
Central Province is sub-divided into the following constituencies (or electoral districts), which are further sub-divided into wards (with populations at the 2009 and 2019 Censuses respectively):

Name		Population (2009 census)			Population (2019 census)		
Name		Total	Male	Female	Total	Male	Female
30. – Nggela		16,811	8,500	8,311	19,862	10,236	9,626
30.01.	Sandfly/Buenavista	3,226	1,663	1,563	3,729	1,954	1,775
30.02.	West Gala	2,220	1,110	1,110	2,588	1,305	1,283
30.03.	East Gala	2,026	1,040	986	2,494	1,299	1,195
30.04.	Tulagi	1,251	658	593	1,481	799	682
30.05.	South West Gela	2,586	1,299	1,287	3,154	1,639	1,515
30.06.	South East Gela	1,662	827	835	1,819	899	920
30.07.	North East Gela	2,118	1,078	1,040	2,567	1,310	1,257
30.08.	North West Gela	1,722	825	897	2,030	1,031	999
31. – Russels and Savo		9,240	4,761	4,479	10,456	5,326	5,130
31.09.	Banika	2,019	1,062	957	2,115	1,096	1,019
31.10.	Pavuvu	1,956	994	962	2,051	1,010	1,041
31.11.	Lovukol	2,128	1,099	1,029	2,576	1,310	1,266
31.12.	North Savo	1,520	800	720	1,564	824	740
31.13.	South Savo	1,617	806	811	2,150	1,086	1,064
Total		26,051	13,261	12,790	30,318	15,562	14,756

== Islands and settlements ==
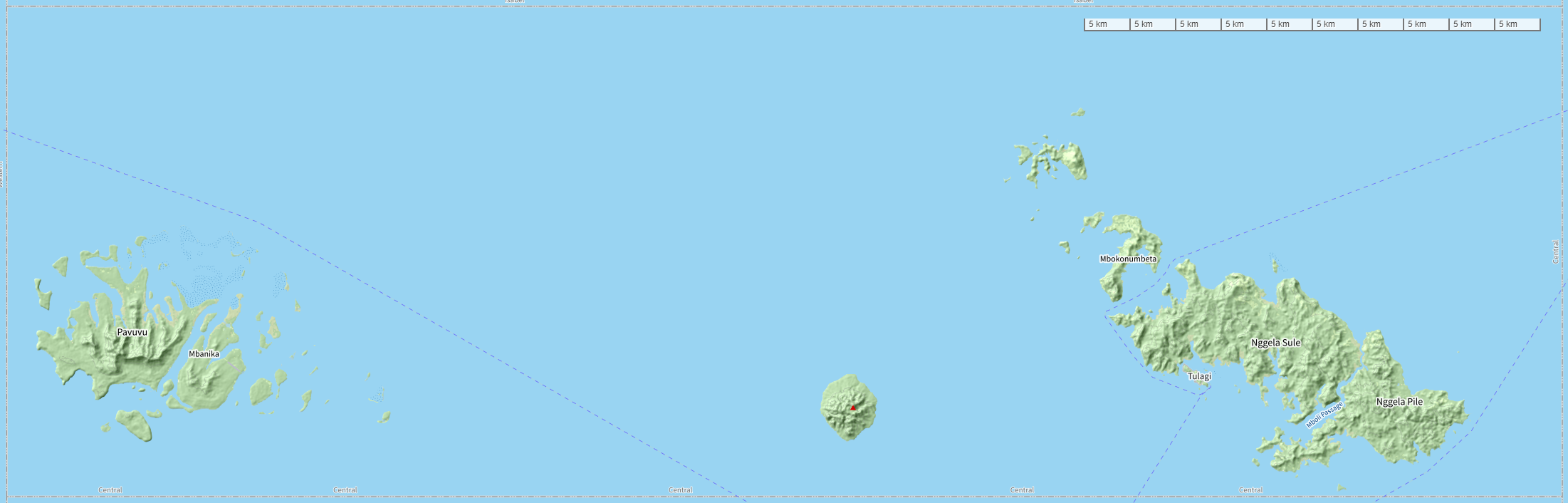
(From left to right) Russell Islands, Savo Island and Nggela Islands

- Russell Islands
  - Mbanika - Yandina
  - Aeaun
- Savo - Kusini, Reko
- Nggela Islands
  - Tulagi - Tulagi
