= Savo Island =

Island in Solomon Islands

Savo
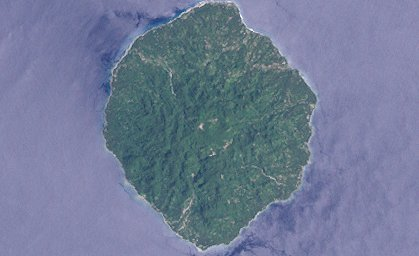
- Landsat view of Savo Island

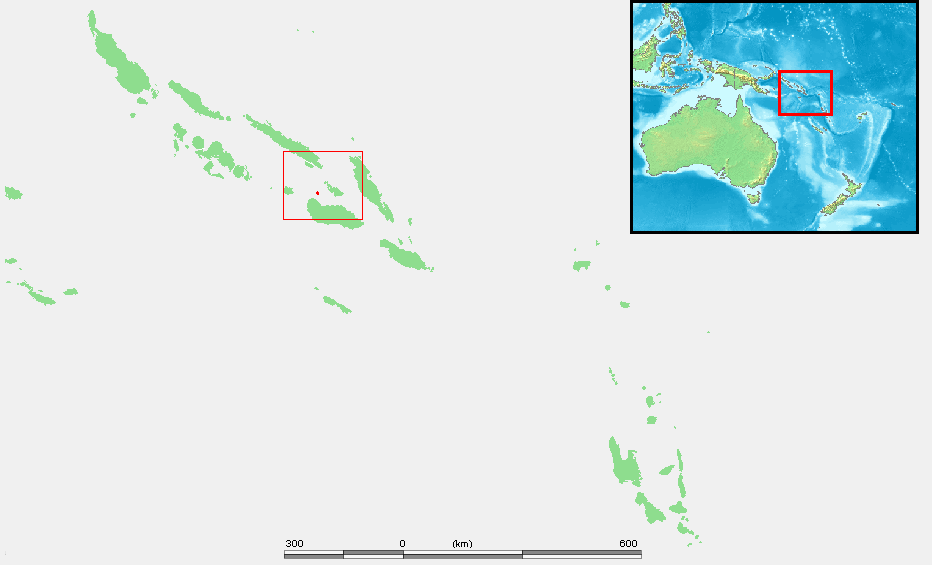

Geography
- Location: Pacific Ocean
- Coordinates: 9°8′0″S 159°49′0″E
- Archipelago: Solomon Islands
- Total islands: 1
- Area: 31 km^{2} (12 sq mi)
- Length: 7.2 km (4.47 mi)
- Width: 6 km (3.7 mi)
- Highest elevation: 485 m (1591 ft)
- Highest point: Mount Savo

Administration
- Solomon Islands
- Province: Central Province
- Largest settlement: Alialia

Demographics
- Population: 3137 (2009-11-23)

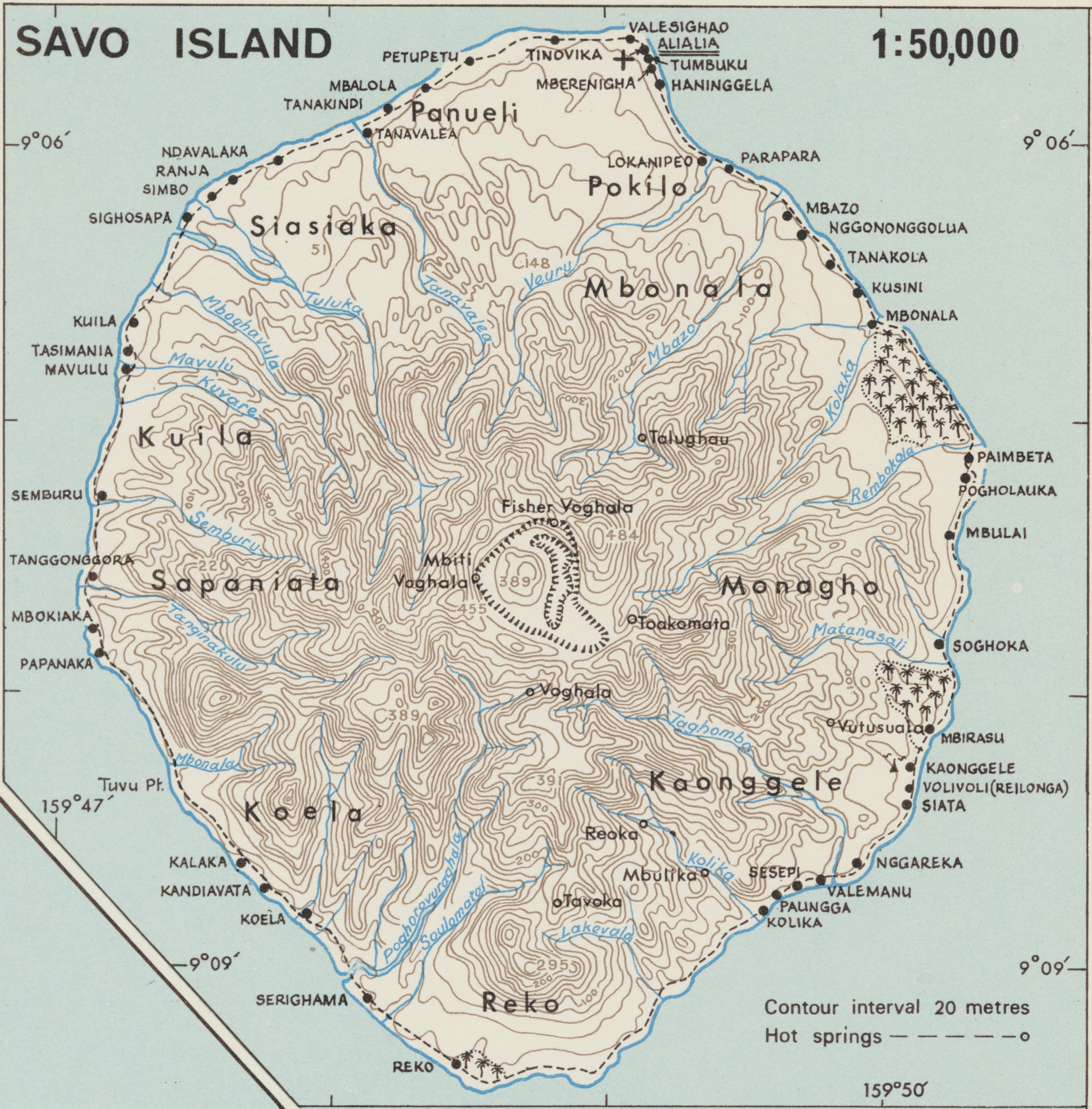
Topographic map of Savo Island (1968), with heights in meters

Savo Island is an island in Solomon Islands in the South Pacific ocean. Administratively, Savo Island is a part of the Central Province of Solomon Islands. It is about 35 kilometres (22 mi) from the national capital of Honiara. The principal village is Alialia, in the north of the island.

The indigenous language of Savo is the Savosavo language, an East Papuan language. Savo Island also has a minority of Gela speakers.

The waters surrounding the island were the site of five of the seven major naval battles during the Battle of Guadalcanal in the Pacific War of World War II. As a result of these battles, many shipwrecks are located southeast of the island; the bay is known as Ironbottom Sound. The wrecks near the coast are very popular with wreck divers.

== Geography ==
Savo is approximately circular, measuring approximately 6 kilometres (3.7 mi) by 7 kilometres (4.3 mi). It is located 15 kilometres (9.3 mi) northeast of Cape Esperance, the northern tip of Guadalcanal. The highest elevation is a 485 metres (1,591 ft) stratovolcano, which last erupted between 1835 and 1847. The eruption was so strong that it wiped out all life on the island. An older eruption occurred in 1568. According to the World Organization of Volcanic Observatories (WOVO), the volcano is active every 100 to 300 years. On the island are geysers, hot mud lakes and hot springs.

=== The "egg fields" ===
Savo Island is known for the "egg fields" of the megapode, a bird which lays its eggs here and buries them in the warm sand to incubate. The eggs are excavated by local people and are considered a local food specialty. The eggs are slightly larger than a duck egg and are used for preparing omelettes and other dishes.

== History ==
=== European discovery and exploration ===
The first recorded sighting of Savo Island by European explorers was by the Spanish expedition of Álvaro de Mendaña in April 1568. More precisely the sighting was due to a local exploration voyage done by a small boat, in the accounts the brigantine, commanded by maestre de campo Pedro de Ortega Valencia and having Hernán Gallego as pilot. They charted the volcanic island as Sesarga. Considering the expedition leaders Mendaña and cosmographer Pedro Sarmiento de Gamboa were both from Galicia in Spain, it was probably so named after the island of the same name in this region.

On 15 March 1893, Savo Island was declared part of the British Solomon Islands protectorate. The island was occupied by the Empire of Japan in the early stages of the Pacific War.

=== World War II ===
Because of its proximity to Guadalcanal Island and the hotly contested nature of the battles for control of the Solomon Islands, Savo Island figured in many of the naval engagements of the Solomon Islands campaign. It is most well known as the location of several naval battles fought in the adjacent "Ironbottom Sound" during World War II, between the Allied naval forces and the Imperial Japanese Navy.

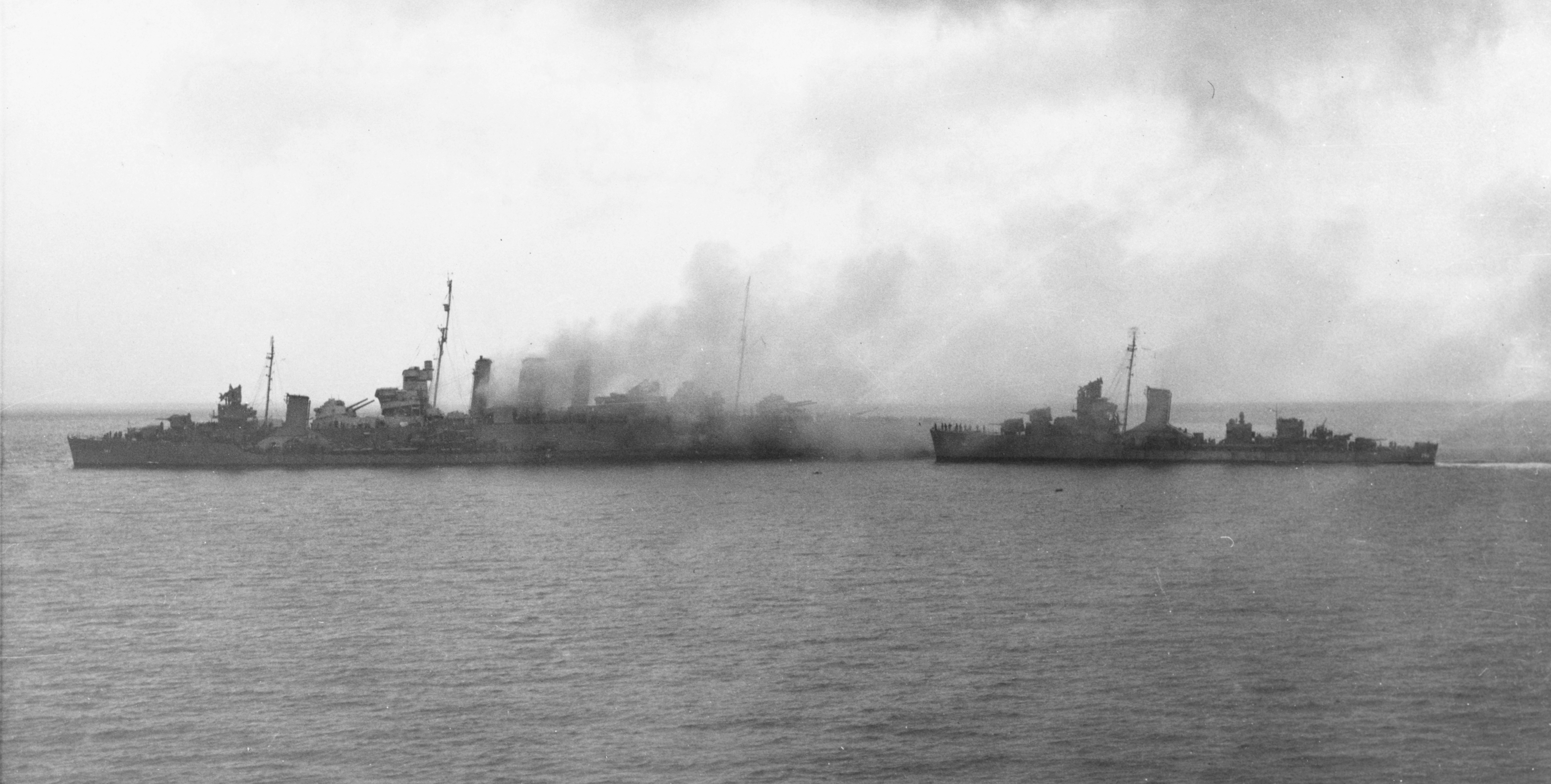
Destroyers removing crew from HMAS Canberra after the Battle of Savo Island, 9 August 1942. USS Blue is alongside Canberra's port bow, as USS Patterson approaches from astern.

List of World War II naval battles fought in the vicinity of Savo Island:

- Battle of Savo Island, 8-9 August 1942
- Battle of Cape Esperance (originally known as the "Second Battle of Savo Island"), 11–12 October 1942
- Naval Battle of Guadalcanal, 13–15 November 1942
- Battle of Tassafaronga, 30 November 1942

Since 1978, the island has been part of the independent state of Solomon Islands.

== See also ==
- List of volcanoes in Solomon Islands
- Geography of the Solomon Islands
- History of Solomon Islands
