= Yandina Airport =

- IATA: XYA; ICAO: AGGY

Summary
- Location: Mbanika, Solomon Islands
- Coordinates: 09°05′34″S 159°13′08″E

Map
- Airport in Solomon Islands
- ASN

Yandina Airport (IATA: XYA, ICAO: AGGY) is an airport on Mbanika in the Solomon Islands.

== History ==
The 33rd Naval Construction Battalion arrived on Banika Island in late February 1943 and commenced construction of a fighter airfield. By 13 April a basic airfield known as Airfield 1, Renard Airfield or South Field was usable. The 35th Battalion took over construction and by mid-May had completed a coral 3,100 feet (940 m) by 150 feet (46 m) runway. By the end of June a taxiway, two warm-up areas, 60 feet (18 m) by 450 feet (140 m), and 25 revetments had been completed and work had commenced on lengthening the runway to 6,000 feet (1,800 m) to make it usable by medium bombers. The 33rd Battalion had also erected an aviation-gasoline tank farm of eight 1,000-barrel tanks, together with piping and fittings. Enemy bombing on June 25, 1943, caused considerable damage to the Tank Farm. One tank was set on fire and was completely destroyed; three others were punctured by shrapnel. The piping was also damaged. Repairs were completed in five days. Gasoline service to the airfield was maintained without interruption.

USAAF units operating from the base included:

- 67th Fighter Squadron operating P-39s from 23 January-15 August 1944

US Navy operating from the base included:

- VB-140 (PV-1) (Lockheed Ventura Bombing Squadron)
- VB-148 (PV-1) (Lockheed Ventura Bombing Squadron)

== See also ==
- Naval Base Banika Island
