= Tulagi =

Small island in Solomon Islands, north of Guadalcanal

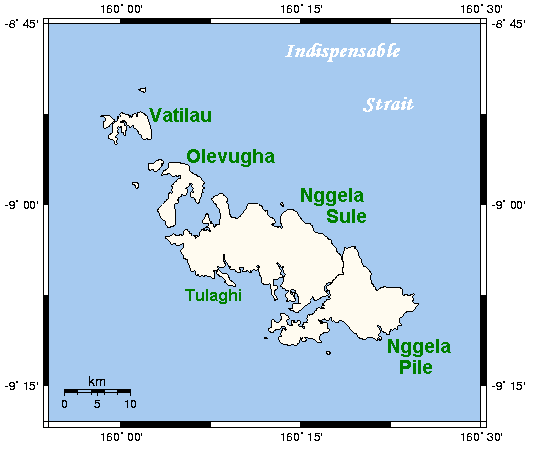
- The Nggela islands group, with Tulagi off the south coast of Nggela Sule

- Location within Solomon Islands

Geography
- Location: South Pacific
- Coordinates: 9°06′05″S 160°08′48″E
- Archipelago: Nggela Islands
- Area: 2.08 km^{2} (0.80 sq mi)
- Length: 2.8 km (1.74 mi)
- Width: 0.8 km (0.5 mi)
- Highest elevation: 100 m (300 ft)

Administration
- Solomon Islands
- Province: Central

Demographics
- Population: 1,481 (2019)

Tulagi (less commonly known as Tulaghi) is a small island in Solomon Islands, just off the south coast of Ngella Sule. The town of Tulagi is the capital of Central Province.

== History ==
The first recorded sighting by Europeans was by the Spanish expedition of Álvaro de Mendaña on 16 April 1568. More precisely, the sighting was due to a local voyage done by a small boat, in the accounts the brigantine Santiago, commanded by Maestre de Campo Pedro Ortega Valencia and having Hernán Gallego as pilot.

From 1896 to 1942, the town of Tulagi was the capital of the British Solomon Islands Protectorate. This island was favored as better isolated and healthier than the disease-ridden larger islands of the archipelago.

=== World War II ===
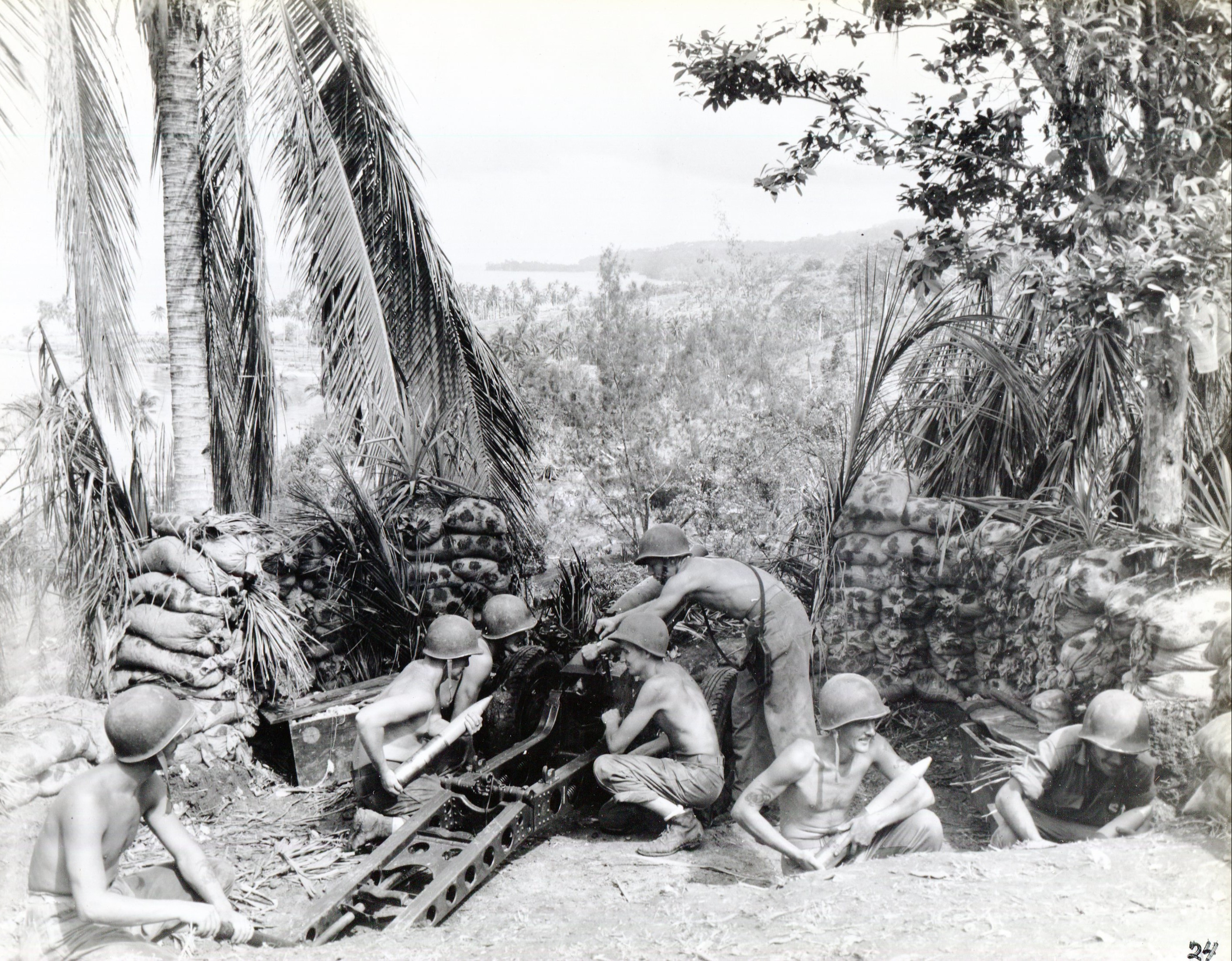
Marine gun emplacement, Tulagi, 1942

The Japanese occupied Tulagi on 3 May 1942, with the intention of establishing a seaplane base nearby (see Japanese Tulagi landing). The ships in Tulagi harbor were raided by planes from USS Yorktown the following day in a prelude to the Battle of the Coral Sea.

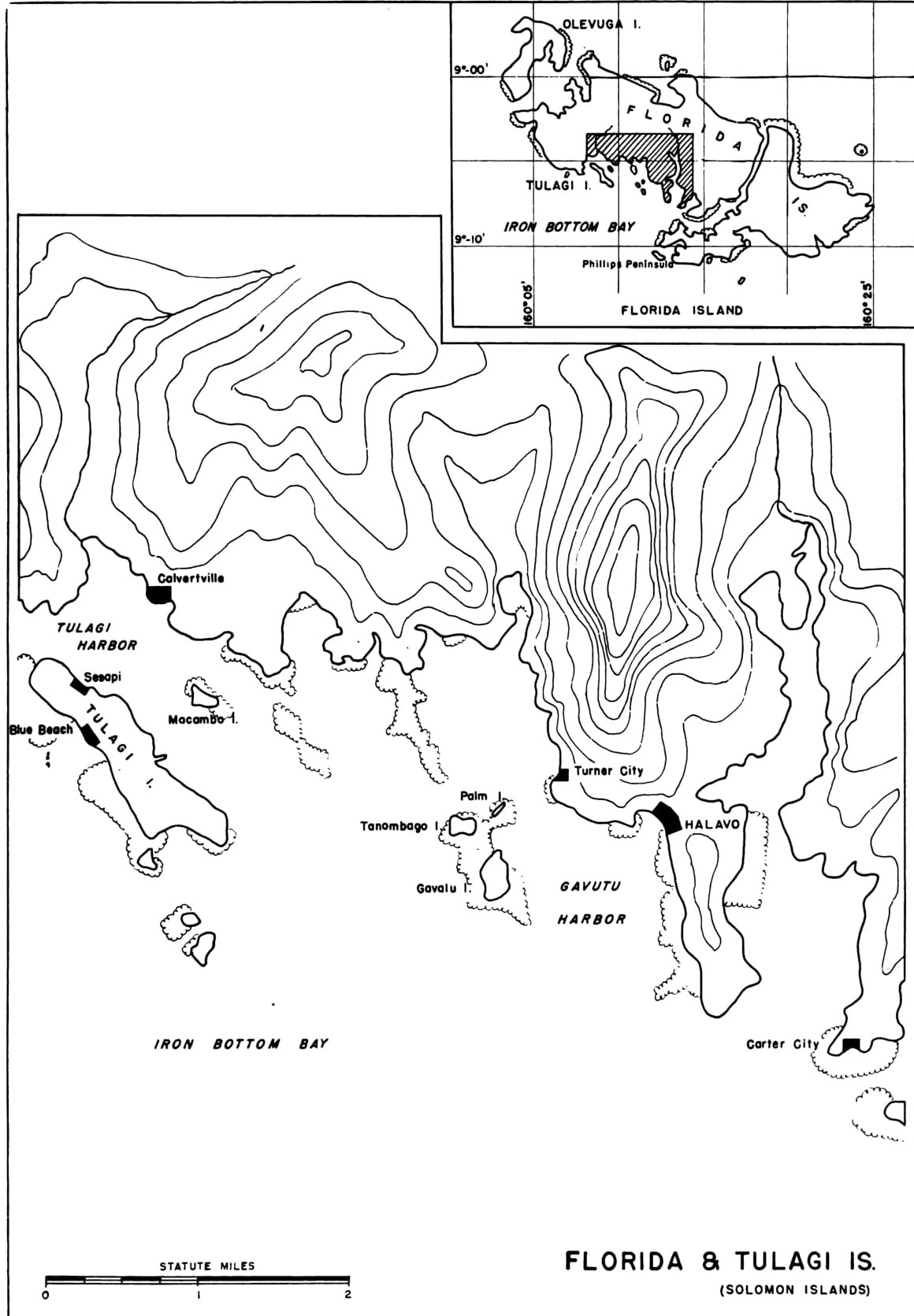
Tulagi Island during World War II

Allied forces, primarily the 1st Marine Raiders, landed on 7 August and captured Tulagi as part of Operation Watchtower after a day of hard fighting.

After its capture by United States Navy and Marine Corps forces, the island hosted a squadron of PT boats for a year (including John F. Kennedy's PT-109) and other ancillary facilities. A small 20-bed dispensary was operated on Tulagi until its closure in 1946. The island also formed part of Purvis Bay, which hosted many US Navy ships through 1942 and 1943.

=== Postwar ===
After World War II, the capital the state of Solomon Islands moved to Honiara, Guadalcanal. Today, Tulagi is the capital of Central Province.

The present-day Tulagi has a fishing fleet.

In October 2019, the government of Central Province signed a deal to grant a 75-year lease of the entire island of Tulagi to the Chinese company China Sam Enterprise Group. However, the deal was declared unconstitutional by the Solomon Islands parliament a week later and the deal was ultimately cancelled.

== Scuba diving ==
Tulagi offers numerous scuba diving locations. The wrecks of USS Aaron Ward, USS Kanawha, and HMNZS Moa are close by, and the wrecks of Ironbottom Sound are not much further off, to the south and west. These three ships were all sunk in the same Japanese naval air raid, part of the Operation "I" on 7 April 1943. The Ward lies upright and intact, its deck replete with artifacts, on a sandy bottom at 70 metres (230 feet).

Tulagi is developing a tourism industry based on scuba.

== Climate ==
Climate data for Tulagi
Month	Jan	Feb	Mar	Apr	May	Jun	Jul	Aug	Sep	Oct	Nov	Dec	Year
Mean daily maximum °C (°F)	31 (88)	31 (88)	31 (88)	31 (88)	31 (87)	30 (86)	30 (86)	30 (86)	30 (86)	31 (87)	31 (88)	32 (89)	31 (87)
Mean daily minimum °C (°F)	24 (76)	24 (76)	24 (76)	24 (76)	24 (76)	24 (75)	24 (75)	23 (74)	24 (76)	24 (76)	24 (76)	24 (76)	24 (76)
Average precipitation mm (inches)	360 (14.3)	400 (15.8)	64 (2.5)	51 (2)	210 (8.1)	170 (6.8)	190 (7.6)	220 (8.7)	200 (8)	220 (8.7)	250 (10)	260 (10.4)	2,560 (100.9)
Source: Weatherbase
