= Russell Islands =

Two small islands in the Solomon Islands

Coordinates: 9.07°S 159.15°E

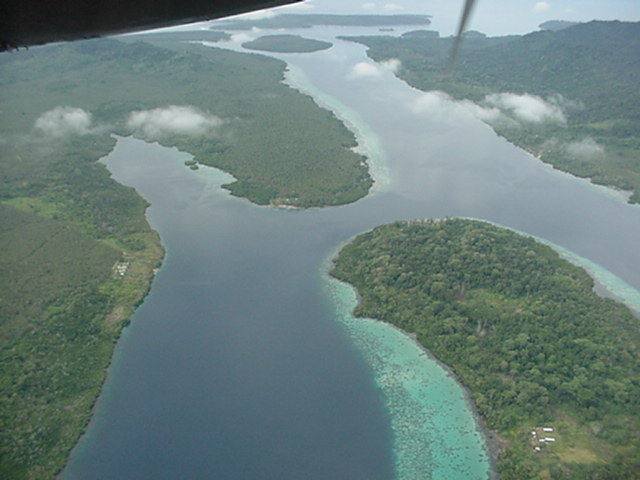
- Image of the Sunlight Channel with Mbanika on the left and Pavuvu on right (click on the image for more details)

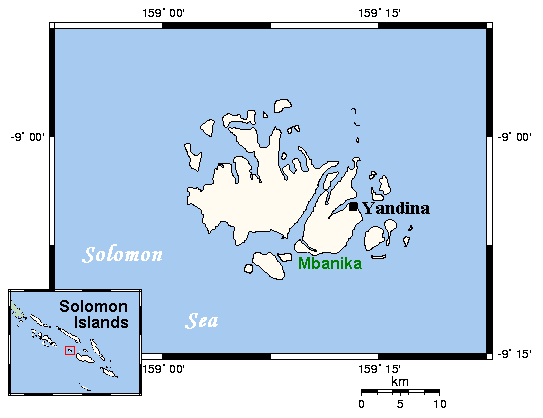
- Map of the Russell Islands, Pavuvu Island is to the left and Mbanika Island is on the right

Administration
- Solomon Islands
- Province: Central Province
- Largest settlement: Yandina

See also Russell Island (disambiguation).

The Russell Islands are two small islands (Pavuvu and Mbanika), as well as several islets, of volcanic origin, in the Central Province of Solomon Islands. They are located approximately 48 kilometres (30 miles) northwest of Guadalcanal. The islands are partially covered in coconut plantations, and have a copra and oil factory at Yandina (on Mbanika). Yandina also has basic services, including a store, post office, and airport.

== People ==
The Lavukal people live on these islands. Their language is Lavukaleve. There is also a settlement of Polynesians, resettled from Tikopia, that lives in Nukufero on the west side of the larger island, Pavuvu. In 1956 the Levers Pacific Plantations company donated 80 acres for use for this resettlement, and later added another 125 acres in the 1960s. This land was subdivided into 4 acre lots for each family. Five hundred people from Tikopia had migrated there by 1965. Te Ariki Taumako who was the third Chief of Tikopia, made an official visit to Nukufero in 1965.

In Yandina, people from all over the Solomon Islands have come to work for the plantation. In addition to their native languages, they speak Solomon Island Pijin, the lingua franca of the Solomon Islands.

== History ==
In March 1943, as part of American military operations during the Solomons campaign of World War II, the islands were occupied by U.S. troops. The US Navy built Naval Base Banika Island in 1943. Remnants of the U.S. presence, such as concrete slabs and large metal storage sheds, still exist. Unexploded ordnance was left behind, including land mines, and bounding anti-personnel mines. Two barges are sunk off the wharf.

In 1998, the Yandina police station was the scene of one of the opening events of the 1998-2003 ethnic tensions between Guale natives of Guadalcanal and Malaitan settlers, when a group of men raided the armoury and stole some high-powered weapons and ammunition. The group involved became known as the Guadalcanal Revolutionary Army, and later as the Isatabu Freedom Movement.

Yandina was the site of a RAMSI post.

== Facilities ==
Havuna Primary School and Yandina Community High School are in the Russell Islands. In 2013 members of the Australian Navy HMAS Tarakan (L 129) rebuilt classrooms in the high school. At that time the principal was Augustine Olibuma. HMAS Diamantina (M 86) and HMAS Huon (M 82) sailors visited the high school in 2016.

At one time the Yandina Plantation Resort provided tourist accommodation for scuba divers. It opened in October 2000 with 12 guest rooms.

== Geography ==
North of the western island Pavuvu are the islets Mane Island, Leru Island, Marulaon Island, and Hanawisi. South of Pavuvu is Boloka, and Alokan Island. Eastwards from Mbanika is Loun Island, Telin Island, and Moie, and Laumuan Island. Northeast of Mbanika is Koemurun Island and Kaukau Island. Other localities on the large island are Lokioleme and Pipisala. On Pavuvu in addition to Yandina, there is also Suun.
