= Provinces of Solomon Islands =

Solomon Islands is divided into nine provinces. The national capital, Honiara, on the island of Guadalcanal, is separately governed as the country's Capital Territory.

== History ==
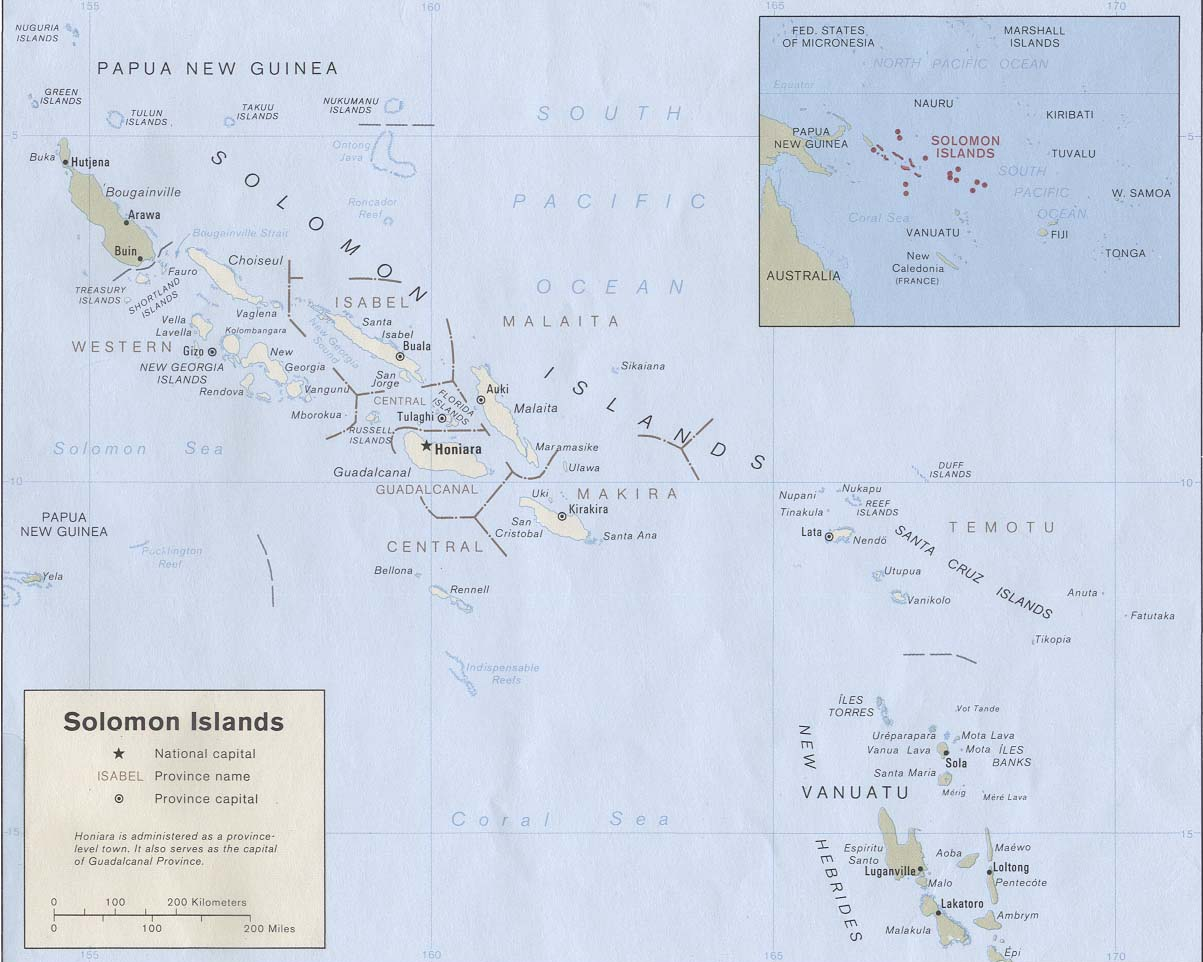
Provinces of Solomon Islands in 1989.

Under the British Solomon Islands Protectorate, there were initially 12 administrative districts: Choiseul, Eastern Solomons, Gizo, Guadalcanal, Lord Howe, Malaita, Nggela and Savo, Rennell and Bellona Islands, Santa Cruz, Shortlands, Sikaiana (Stewart), and Ysabel and Cape Marsh. The administrative centre was in Tulagi.

After World War II, the protectorate was reorganised into four districts, namely Central, Western, Eastern, and Malaita, which were then further subdivided into councils. The administrative centre was moved from Tulagi to Honiara.

At its independence in 1978, the protectorate became the sovereign state of Solomon Islands. Honiara continued to function as the capital of the sovereign nation, and the inherited districts and councils remained until 1981, when the nation was reorganised into seven provinces by splitting some of the districts into provinces: the Central District was split into Central, Guadalcanal, and Isabel provinces, while the Eastern District was split into Makira-Ulawa and Temotu provinces. The other two districts, Western and Malaita, were also designated as provinces. These new provinces corresponded to the councils of the districts before 1981.

In 1983, the 22 square-kilometre Honiara was split from Guadalcanal Province and became a separately-governed capital territory. The city remains as the capital of Guadalcanal Province.

In 1995, Choiseul Province was split from Western Province, and Rennell and Bellona Province was split from Central Province, resulting in the nine provinces and one town council of today.

== Population ==
The population census data is from the 1999, 2009 and 2019 Censuses, as provided by the Solomon Islands National Statistics Office. They show that the population has increased in the past decade for most of the provinces, especially the more urban ones, as urbanisation increases.

The figures for Guadalcanal Province do not include the separately-administered Capital Territory of Honiara; if included, that province would have had a total population of 109,382 in 1999, which would have made it the second largest province by population. By 2009, the combined census total for Guadalcanal and the Capital Territory would be 158,222, which would have made it the most populous province. By 2019, the combined total would be 283,591.

== Provinces ==
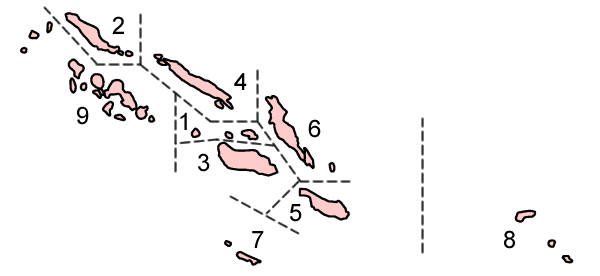
Provinces of Solomon Islands, numbered in alphabetical order.

#	Province	Capital	Premier	Area (km^{2})	Population census 1999	Population census 2009	Population census 2019	Population per km^{2} (2019)
1	Central Province	Tulagi	Kenneth Sagupari	615	21,577	26,051	30,318	49.3
2	Choiseul Province	Taro Island	Harrison Pitakaka	3,837	20,008	26,372	30,775	8.0
3	Guadalcanal Province (Note: excluding the Capital Territory of Honiara.)	Honiara	Willie Atu	5,336	60,275	106,023	154,022	28.9
4	Isabel Province	Buala	Lawrence Hayward	4,136	20,421	26,158	31,420	7.6
5	Makira-Ulawa Province	Kirakira	Stanley Siapu	3,188	31,006	40,419	51,587	16.2
6	Malaita Province	Auki	Elijah Asilaua	4,225	122,620	152,307	172,740	40.9
7	Rennell and Bellona Province	Tigoa	Derek Pongi	671	2,377	3,041	4,100	6.1
8	Temotu Province	Lata	Stanley Tehiahua	868	18,912	21,362	22,319	25.7
9	Western Province	Gizo	Billy Veo	7,509	62,739	76,649	94,106	12.5
–	Capital Territory	Honiara	Eddie Siapu (Note: stylized as mayor of Honiara.)	22	49,107	64,609	129,569	5916.4
–	Solomon Islands	Honiara	Jeremiah Manele (Note: caretaker Prime Minister of Solomon Islands.)	30,407	409,042	515,870	720,956	23.7

== See also ==
- ISO 3166-2:SB
