= Naval Mobile Construction Battalion 25 =

- Country: United States of America
- Branch: United States Navy
- Type: Navy Reserve
- Size: 600

Commanders
- Current commander: CAPT Deniz Piskin

'WWII Unit Insignia

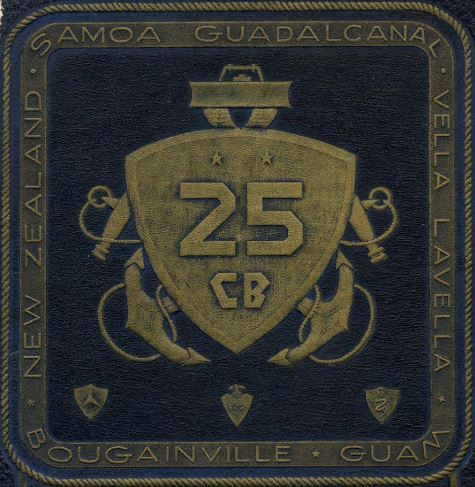
25th Naval Construction Battalion insignia

3rd Marine Division insignia

CB 25 incorporated the Divisional shield into the battalion's insignia

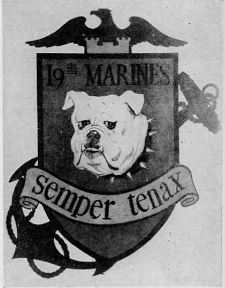
19th Marines insignia. The 25th CB was third battalion in the 19th Regiment. p.12

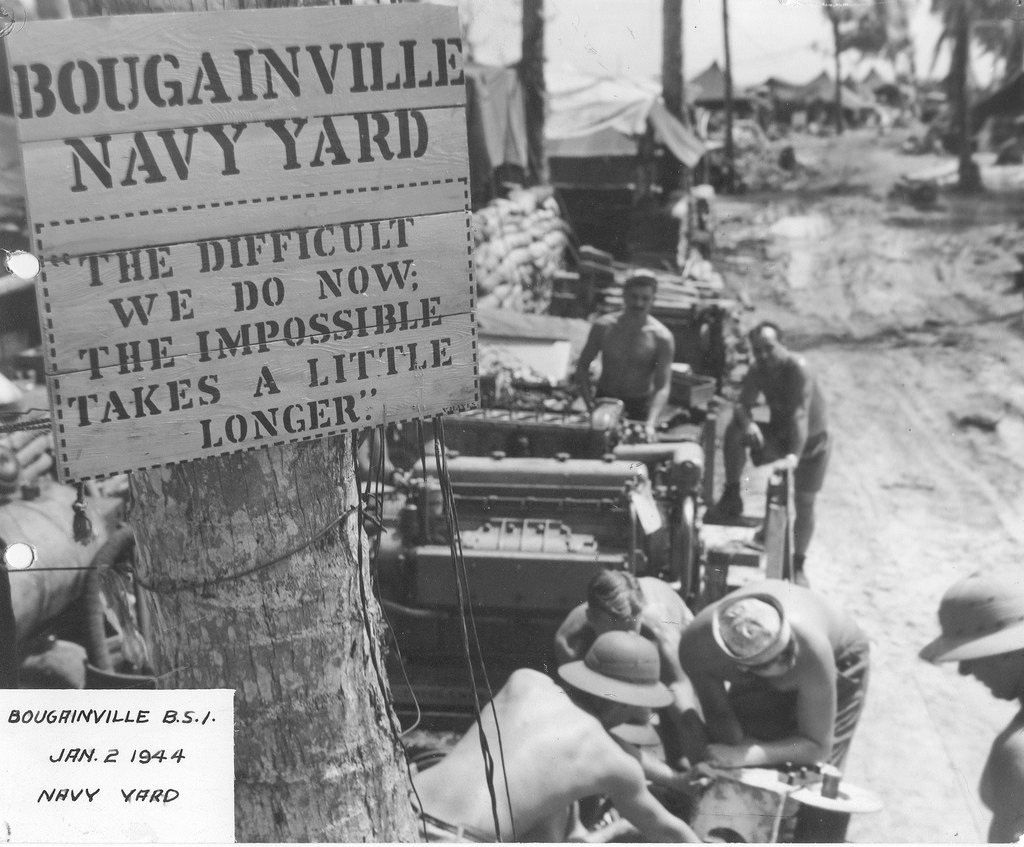
CB Navy Yard Bougainville with the Seabee Expression (January 1944)

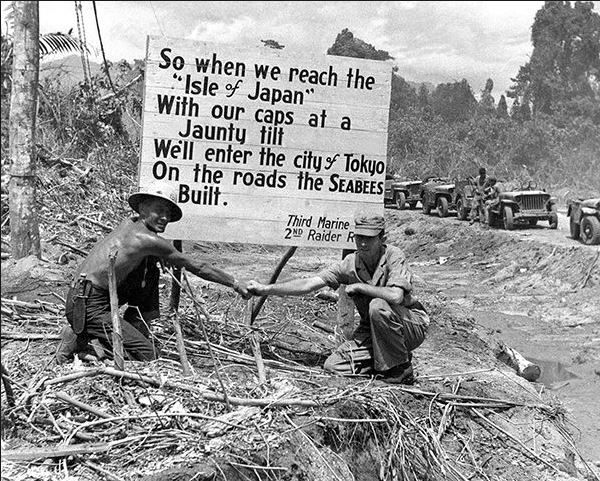
The 53rd CB, which was formed from B Co 25th CB, built the road behind this 2nd Marine Raider Battalion sign on Bougainville. The Navy had transferred B Co 25th CB to a different Marine Corps battalion; when the Marines needed another CB, B Company was used to commission the 53rd CB, attached to I Marine Amphibious Corps. (November 1943)

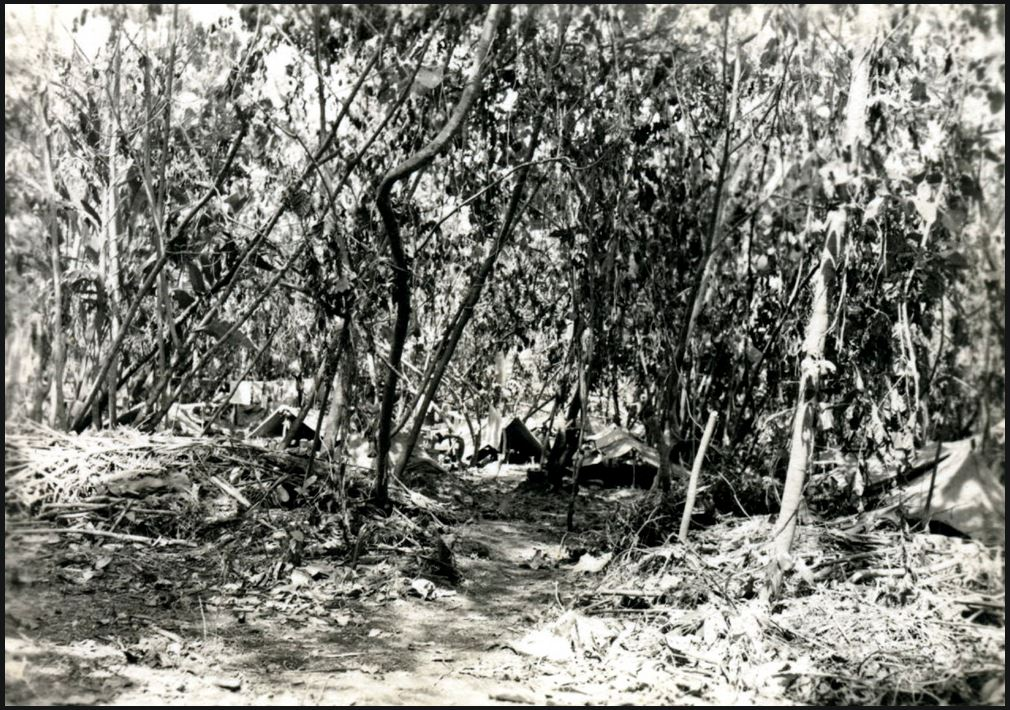
Third Battalion 19th Marines (25th NCB) tent camp on Bougainville (November 1943)

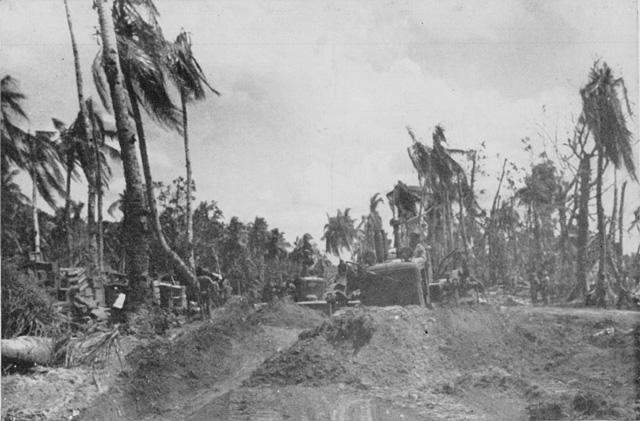
25th Seabees with International TD-18s build road from Agat Bay to III Amphibious Corps front lines on Guam (August 1944)

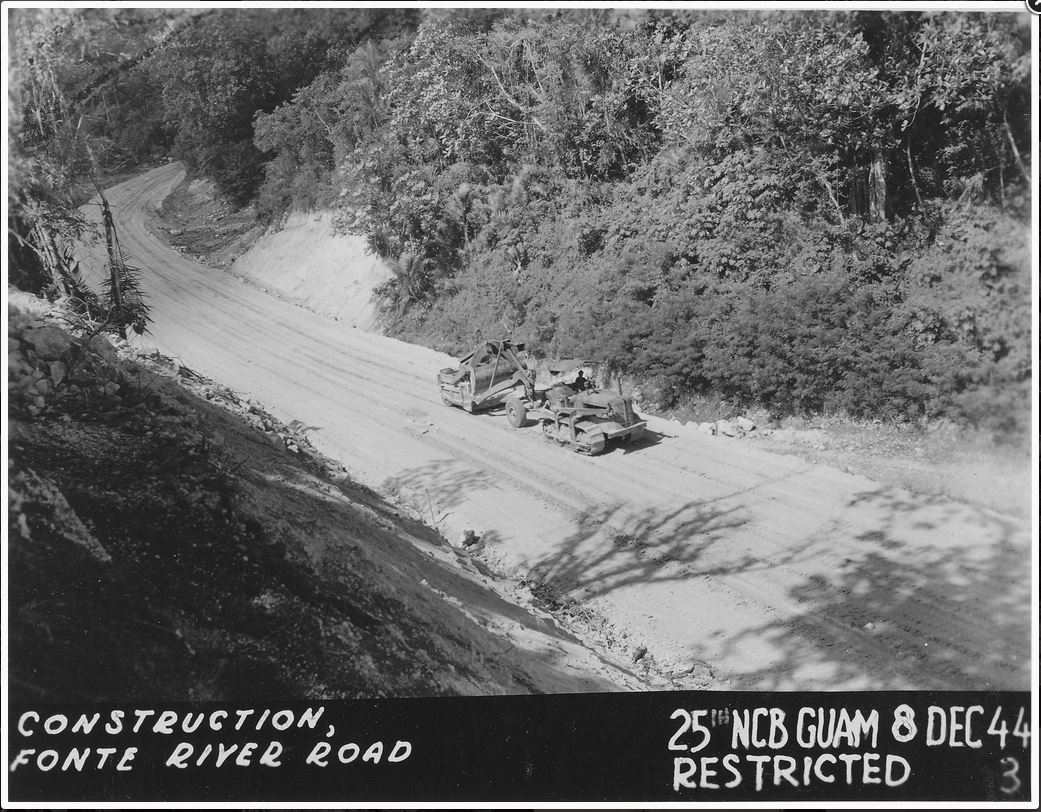
25th CB TD-18 with Le tourneau scraper doing road work on Guam (December 1944) p.70

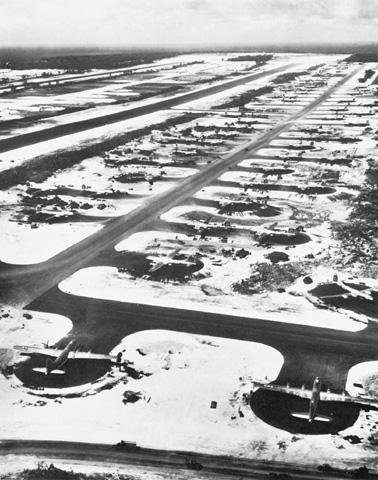
Harmon Field hardstands for the 20th Air Force on Guam, built by 25th Seabees (1945)

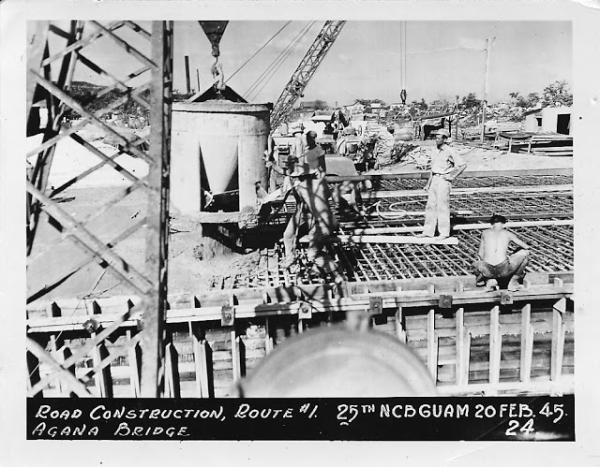
25th Seabees building a bridge at Agana, Guam (February 1945)

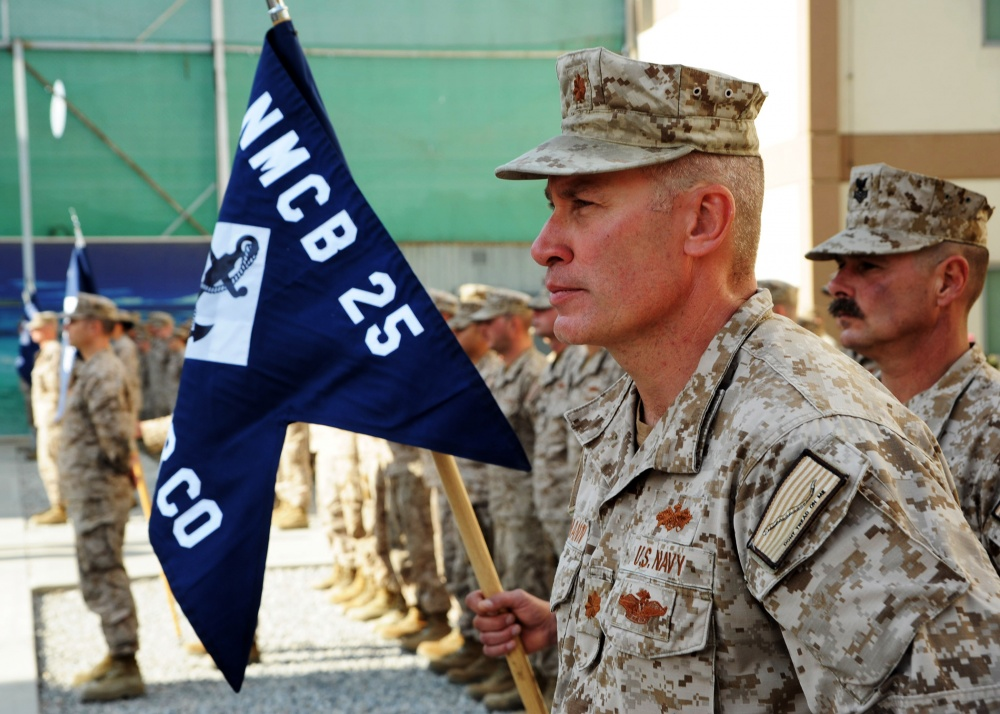
NMCB 25, the last CB out of Afghanistan

Naval Mobile Construction Battalion 25 or NMCB 25 is a Navy Reserve Seabee unit that is headquartered at Port Hueneme, CA. Its World War II predecessor was one of three CBs transferred to the Marine Corps in the late summer of 1942 as combat engineers. Those three battalions were attached to composite Marine Engineer Regiments as the third battalion of their respective regiment. All of them remained with the Marine Corps for the next two years before they were released and returned to the Navy. At the end of World War II the battalion was decommissioned. In 1961, it was recommissioned in the Naval Construction Force Reserve where it remains today.

== History ==
=== World War II ===
On 13 September 1942, the 25th Naval Construction Battalion was commissioned at Camp Bradford, Virginia and sent to Ports Hueneme. Headquarters and A, C & D Companies were transferred to the Marine Corps and sent to Camp Elliot, San Diego on 31 October. Camp Elliot was the home of the Fleet Marine Force (FMF) Training Center, West Coast. "Its mission was the training of individual replacements for combat duty". Marine battalions had a four company format which is why one company was released. B Company was transferred to the NCB Replacement Group, FMF-TC and used as the core for the 53rd NCB (with B Company's commander becoming the battalion commander). As history would have it, the 25th and 53rd have been paired from then on. Both were assigned to the Marine Corps and deployed to the same places. The rest of the 25th was posted to the Third Marine Division, FMF and re-designated as the Third Battalion of the 19th Marines. The Marines had three battalions to a regiment. The first battalion had Companies A, B, & C, while the second had Companies D, E, & F and the third battalion had Companies G, H, & I.

- G Company and 1/5 Hq Company 1 January 1943 transferred to 9th Marines (reinforced), Third Marine Division, arrived Auckland, New Zealand in February
- H Company and 1/5 Hq Company 25 January 1943 transferred to 21st Marines (reinforced), Third Marine Division, arrived Auckland, New Zealand in February
- I Company and 1/5 Hq Company 15 February 1943 transferred to Hq Amphibious Corps Fleet Marine Force via: Pago Pago, Tutuila and American Samoa arrived Auckland New Zealand 28 May. This company was later attached to the 3rd Marines.

In June, the battalion was detached from the Marines and returned to battalion administration of a headquarters and three construction companies. They were sent to Guadalcanal in preparation of the Bougainville campaign. On 1 November 386 men and 15 Officers landed there under fire. By 28 November an additional 317 men and 6 Officers had landed. On Bougainville the 25th worked with the 53rd and 71st NCBs. The battalion returned to Guadalcanal in early January 1944. The 19th Marines were decommissioned with the 25th released from the administrative control of the 3rd Marine Division on 11 April. They were again redesignated the 25th NCB. However, the battalion was then attached to III Amphibious Corps, FMF for administrative purposes and to the 3rd Marine Division operationally.

- 3rd Marine Division Order of Battle of Bougainville:
  - 3rd Marine Regimental Combat Team – C, F, & I Companies 19th Marines
  - 9th Marine Regimental Combat Team – A, D, & G Companies 19th Marines
  - 21st Marine Regimental Combat Team – B, E, & H Companies 19th Marines (assault reserve)

On 21 July 1944, 621 men and 23 Officers landed under fire on Guam, with the 3rd Marine Division. The Division had three shore parties one for each regiment. 25 NCB had I Co. posted to the 3rd Marine Regiment, G Co. to the 9th Marines and H Co. to the 21st Marines. Each shore party was made up of one Pioneer Company and one Seabee company. Commander Whelan was Shore party Commander for the 3rd marine Regiment on Beaches Red 1 and Red 2. During the assault phase the entire 19th Marines were assigned to combat teams. The 25th's Lt.Cmdr. Whelan was shore party commander for the 3rd Marine Regiment on beaches Red 1 and Red 2. He received the bronze star for his leadership of the shore party as did Lt Cdr. Brett W. Walker for the same reason on beaches Blue and Green. The jungle conditions were such that bulldozers were required for everything. Roads had to be grubbed to get supplies to the front, the wounded evacuated, and the artillery em-placed. There were numerous times the Seabees were working in front of the lines in order for the lines to advance and lost men doing that. Dozers were needed so badly that those organic to the artillery units had to be reassigned until they were not required. The Seabees brought with an organic element the Marines did not have i.e. bulldozers with winches and D8s 132–148 Hp compared to the Marine's TD 18s 72–80 Hp. Afterwards the Marines assessment was that: "in all future amphibious operations a Seabee component or one with equal road building capabilities be assigned to the assault". It was not until 20 September that that entire Battalion was completely on Guam. One of the Battalions projects was Harmon Airfield.

- 3rd Marine Division Order of Battle of Guam (1944):
  - 9th Marine Regimental Combat Team – A, D, & G Companies 19th Marines
  - 21st Marine Regimental Combat Team -B, E, & H Companies 19th Marines
  - 3rd Marine Regimental Combat Team – C, F, & I Companies 19th Marines (assault reserve)

On 17 August, the battalion returned to the Navy administration and assigned to the 27th NCR of the 5th Construction Brigade. Another former USMC CB, the 53rd was assigned to the 27th NCR as was the 2nd Separate Marine Engineer Battalion. The 25th was decommissioned in November 1945 with the 133rd NCB taking over its work orders on Guam.

Note: 25 NCB was the only unit to serve with Army, Navy and Marine Corps formations during WWII.

=== 1960s to present ===
The battalion was recommissioned in October 1961 at Davisville, RI. From 1995 until 2014, NMCB 25's homeport was Fort McCoy, Wisconsin, where it had moved from Glenview, Ill. Its headquarters has since moved to Port Hueneme, CA, where it is still listed as a reserve unit.

- Deployments:
  - Iraq 2006
  - Guantanamo Bay 2009–2010
  - Haiti earthquake 2010
  - Afghanistan 2014
  - Afghanistan 2019

== Unit awards ==
- Unit Letter of Commendation from Lt Col Fojt, Commanding Officer 19th Marines, for action on Guam and the Marianas
- 1996, 2006, 2019 Admiral Perry Award
- Unit Letter of Commendation from Secretary of the Navy
- 2014 Citizens Patriot Unit Award
- Navy "E" Ribbon: – U.S. Atlantic Fleet Battle "E". 9 times: 1996, 1998, 2005, 2006, 2009, 2012, 2016, 2019, 2020

note: On Bougainville the 3rd Combat Team was awarded a Naval Unit Commendation. That award has the standard statement at the bottom "and all those attached to or serving with". None of the men attached to or serving with the 3rd Marine Regiment received that NUC including I Co 19th Marines(C Co. 25th CB)

note: On Guam the 3rd Combat Team was awarded a Presidential Unit Citation. That award has the standard statement at the bottom "and all those attached to or serving with". Not all of the units attached to or serving with the 3rd Marine Regiment received that PUC including I Co 19th Marines(C Co. 25th CB)

note: On Guam the 21st Combat Team was awarded a Naval Unit Citation. That award has the standard statement at the bottom "and all those attached to or serving with". Not all of the units attached to or serving with the 21st Marine Regiment received that NUC including H Co 19th Marines(B Co. 25th CB)

== Campaign awards ==
- Asiatic-Pacific Campaign Medal with the FMF and two arrowheads (Bougainville, Guam)
- World War II Victory Medal
- Global War on Terrorism Service Medal
- Global War on Terrorism Expeditionary Medal
- Afghanistan Campaign Medal

Naval personnel who served in combat under fire with the Marines during World War II qualified for the Fleet Marine Force Combat Operation Insignia (FMF) on their campaign medal and ribbon. This is a "Restricted "device and the service member must have also been under USMC "Operational" control.

== CB logo ==
The World War II unit logo borrowed the shield "style or pattern" used for the Third Marine Division's crest. The unit number 25 is emblazoned in the center with the letters "C B" and there are crossed anchors behind shield. Center top it has a frontal view of a bulldozer. Beneath the shield are three USMC logos: left is the Third Marine Division, center is another insignia for the 19th Marine Regiment, and right is the Third Marine Amphibious Corps, signifying the USMC elements to which the 25th had been posted. The color version has the red, gold, and black of the 3rd Marines. When the battalion was reactivated it did not have a copy of the WWII unit history and was unaware of the WWII logo. This led to the current insignia being designed and adopted. The same thing happened with the 133rd when it was re-commissioned.

== See also ==
- Admiral Ben Moreell
- Amphibious Construction Battalion 1 (ACB-1)
- Amphibious Construction Battalion 2 (ACB-2)
- Battle of Guam (1944)
- Bougainville Campaign
- Civil Engineer Corps United States Navy
- Naval Construction Battalion aka Seabee
- Naval Amphibious Base Little Creek
- Naval Amphibious Base Coronado
- Naval Construction Battalion Center (Gulfport, Mississippi)
- Naval Construction Battalion Center Port Hueneme
- Naval Mobile Construction Battalion 1
- Naval Mobile Construction Battalion 3
- Naval Mobile Construction Battalion 4
- Naval Mobile Construction Battalion 5
- Naval Mobile Construction Battalion 11
- Naval Mobile Construction Battalion 133
- Seabees in World War II
- Seabees Memorial
- 3rd Marine Division
- III Marine Expeditionary Force (redesignated III Amphibious Corps, 15 April 1944)
- 16th Marine Regiment (Engineer)
- 17th Marine Regiment (Engineer) 19th NCB
- 18th Marine Regiment (Engineer) 18th NCB
- 19th Marine Regiment (Engineer) 25th NCB
- 20th Marine Regiment (Engineer) 121st NCB

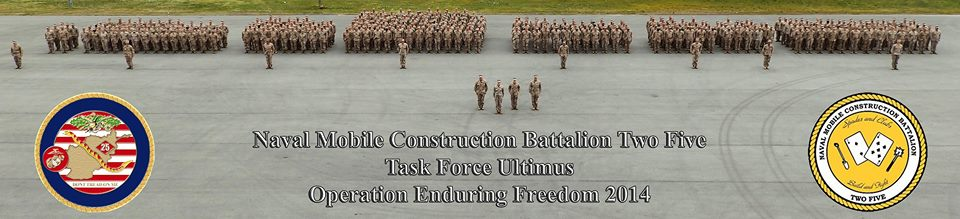
NMCB 25 battalion photo in Gulfport, before deploying to Afghanistan (March 2014)
