= Yokohama Air Group =

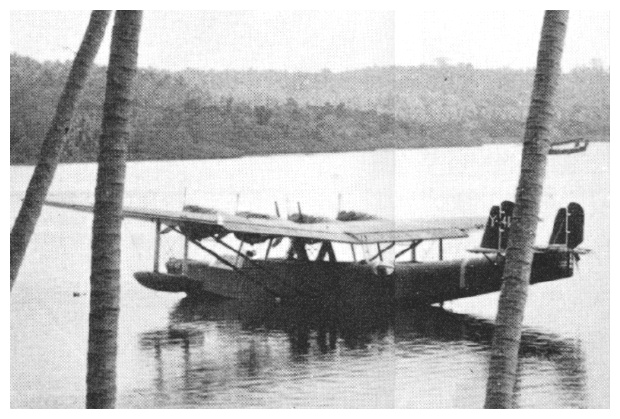
- A Yokohama Kawanishi H6K5 at an unidentified location in the Solomon Islands in 1942
- Active: October 1, 1936 – November 1, 1942
- Country: Empire of Japan
- Allegiance: Axis Powers of World War II
- Branch: Imperial Japanese Navy
- Type: Naval aviation unit
- Role: Bomber, fighter, and reconnaissance using flying boats
- Size: Varied
- Garrison/HQ: Yokohama, Japan; Majuro, Marshall Islands; Rabaul, New Britain; Buin, Papua New Guinea, Shortland Islands and Tulagi, Solomon Islands
- Engagements: Battle of Wake Island; New Guinea Campaign, Solomon Islands Campaign

Insignia
- Identification symbol: ヨハ (Oct 1936-Nov 1940)
- Identification symbol: Y (Nov 1940-Nov 1941)

The Yokohama Air Group (横浜海軍航空隊, Yokohama Kaigun Kōkūtai) was an aircraft and airbase garrison unit of the Imperial Japanese Navy Air Service during the Pacific campaign of World War II.

== History ==
The Yokohama Air Group was formed in Yokohama, Japan on October 1, 1936 as a patrol unit equipped with six Navy Type 91 Hiro H4H flying boats. On December 1, 1941 it was re-equipped with 24 Navy Type 97 Kawanishi H6K flying boats and assigned to support Japanese IJN 4th Fleet operations in the central Pacific as part of the 24th Air Flotilla.

=== Wake Island operations ===
Immediately following the attack on Pearl Harbor, and start of hostilities against the United States, Japanese forces attempted to seize strategically located Wake Island. The initial Japanese landing attempts were repelled by the island’s United States Marine Corps defenders before the Japanese troops were able to land, with the loss of the Japanese destroyers Kisaragi and Hayate. In response the Japanese sent two Kawanishi H6K’s on a reconnaissance flight from their forward operating base at Majuro, arriving at Wake at 0500 hours on December 12. Each plane dropped four 250-kg and twelve 60-kg bombs, but one was shot down by a USMC Grumman F4F Wildcat.

This mission was followed by a second night sortie of ten Kawanishi H6K’s launched from Wotje, of which half turned back due to various mechanical difficulties before reaching their target. The remaining five aircraft ineffectually bombed Wake, with damage limited by poor visibility.

On December 15, a third sortie was attempted with seven Kawanishi H6K’s launched from Wotje, of which six reached their targets at 1730 hours, each dropping four 250-kg and twelve 60-kg bombs and returning to Wotje without losses. A final mission was undertaken by eight aircraft on December 18, arriving over Wake at 1752 hours and dropping a total of five 250-kg and seventy-eight 60-kg bombs, encountering little opposition. Wake Island surrendered to Japan on December 23.

=== Southwest Pacific operations ===
On February 14, 1942, a detachment of seven Kawanishi H6K’s was sent to Rabaul, New Britain and assigned to the 25th Air Flotilla, where they conducted reconnaissance and bombing missions in support of Japanese offensives in Papua New Guinea and the Solomon Islands. On April 1, 1942 the unit gained twelve Navy Type 2 Nakajima A6M2-N fighter seaplanes, which were tasked with defending Japanese bases in the same area from Allied bombing raids from June 2, 1942. The Yokohama Air Group also established small detachments at forward bases at Buin and the Shortland Islands, as well as a large detachment at Tulagi in May 1942. All was quiet during the month of June. On July 9, the unit’s fighters intercepted two USAAF B-24 Liberator bombers on a reconnaissance mission, and shot down one of them. This was followed by the successful downing of a USAAF B-17 Flying Fortress on July 17, and again on July 23, but with the loss of one A6M2-N fighter.

On August 1, in a major engagement, six A6M2-N fighters intercepted a flight of seven B-17s, damaging three but failing to down any aircraft. This was followed by twelve separate engagements the following day, with both sides claiming unconfirmed victories.

During the Battle of Tulagi and Gavutu–Tanambogo on August 7, aircraft from the aircraft carrier USS Wasp (CV-7) dive-bombed Japanese installations on Tulagi, Gavutu, Tanambogo, and Florida Island and strafed and destroyed 15 Yokohama seaplanes floating in the anchorages near the islands. Several of the seaplanes were warming their engines in preparation for takeoff and were lost with their aircrews and many of their support personnel. The survivors, commanded by Captain Shigetoshi Miyazaki, joined the detachment of the 3rd Kure Special Naval Landing Force (SNLF) and fought as infantry until they were annihilated to the last man.

On October 1, 1942, the remainder of the unit which had not been deployed to Tulagi returned to Japan and were re-equipped with sixteen Navy Type 2 Kawanishi H8K flying boats. On November 1, 1942 the flying unit was redesignated as the 801 Air Group.
