= RAAF Tanambogo =

- Tanambogo in Solomon Islands
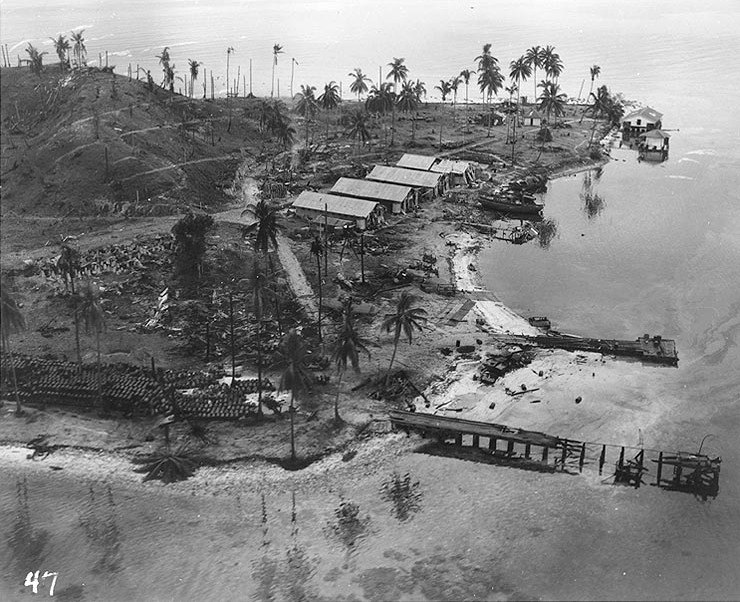
- The Japanese Imperial Navy Air Service seaplane base at Tanambogo, 8 August 1942, after being bombed by US aircraft prior to a US Marines assault.

Location
- Coordinates: 9°6′37.77″S 160°11′9.07″E

RAAF Tanambogo was a Royal Australian Air Force seaplane advanced operating base on the islands of Tanambogo, Gaomi and Gavutu, British Solomon Islands, constructed in 1939. Tanambogo and Gavutu were connected by causeway.

No. 11 and No. 20 Squadrons flying PBY 4 Catalinas operated from the base until shortly before it was occupied by the Japanese 3rd Kure Special Naval Landing Force in May 1942. Tanambogo was later utilised by the Yokohama and Yokusuka Air Groups.

The base was liberated by the 1st Parachute Battalion and 3rd Battalion, 2nd Marines during a battle that was fought between 7 and 9 August 1942, and resulted in 70 US marines and 476 Japanese being killed; prior to the battle the base was heavily damaged by naval gunfire as part of preparatory fires to soften Japanese defences.

The base was later used by the United States Navy.
