= Battle of Tulagi and Gavutu–Tanambogo =

1942 World War II land battle

- Part of the Pacific Theater of World War II
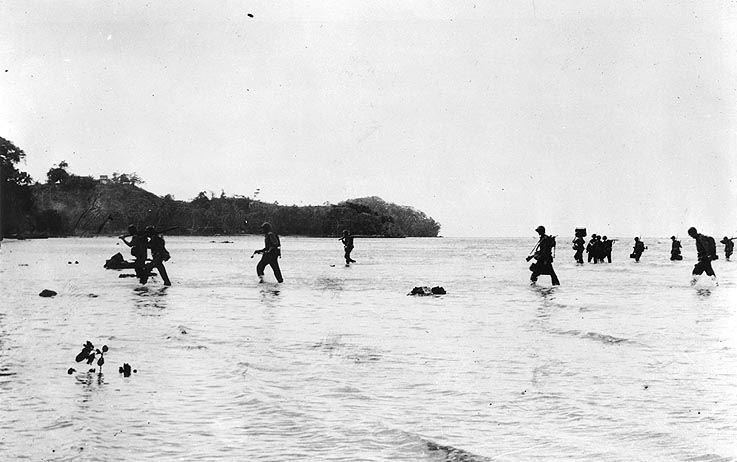
- United States Marines wade ashore on Tulagi Island on 7 August 1942.
Date	7–9 August 1942
Location	Tulagi and Gavutu in the Solomon Islands 9°07′S 160°10′E
Result	Allied victory

Belligerents
United States; United Kingdom; British Solomon Islands	Japan

Commanders and leaders
(United States) Alexander Vandegrift; (United States) William H. Rupertus; (United States) Gerald C. Thomas	(Empire of Japan) Sadayoshi Yamada; (Empire of Japan) Shigetoshi Miyazaki †; (Empire of Japan) Masaaki Suzuki †

Strength
7,500	1,500

Casualties and losses
248 dead	1,500 dead 23 captured
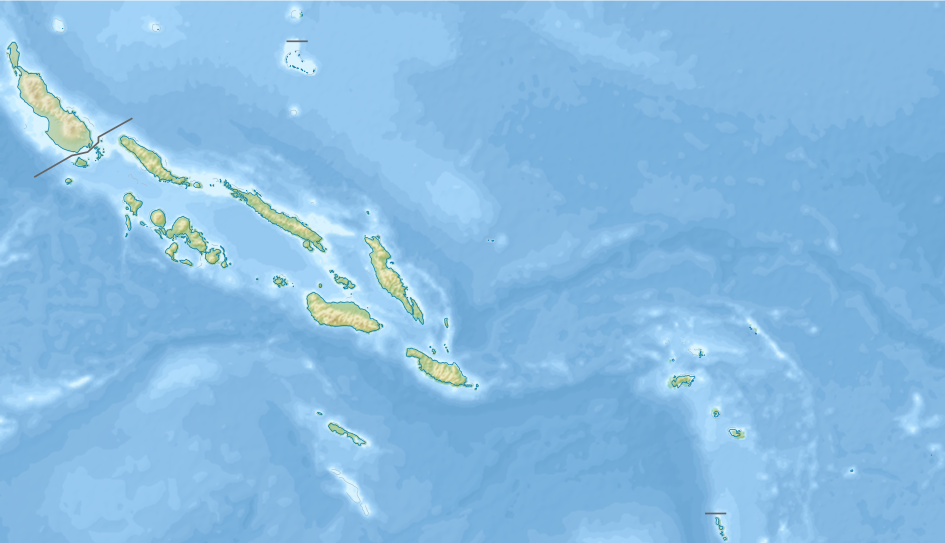
- Location within Solomon Islands Battle of Tulagi and Gavutu–Tanambogo (Pacific Ocean)

The Battle of Tulagi and Gavutu–Tanambogo was a land battle of the Pacific campaign of World War II, between the forces of the Imperial Japanese Navy and Allied (mainly United States Marine Corps) ground forces. It took place 7–9 August 1942 on the Solomon Islands, during the initial Allied landings in the Guadalcanal campaign.

U.S. Marines of the 1st Marine Division, commanded by U.S. Major General Alexander Vandegrift, and the invasion force under Brigadier General William Rupertus, captured the islands of Tulagi, Gavutu, and Tanambogo. The Japanese Navy had built a naval and seaplane base on these islands. The landings were fiercely resisted by the Japanese Navy troops who, heavily outnumbered and outgunned by the Allied forces, fought and died almost to the last man.

While the landings on Tulagi and Gavutu–Tanambogo were taking place, Allied troops were also landing on nearby Guadalcanal, with the objective of capturing an airfield under construction by Japanese forces. In contrast to the intense fighting on Tulagi and Gavutu, the landings on Guadalcanal were essentially unopposed. The landings on both Tulagi and Guadalcanal initiated the six-month-long Guadalcanal campaign and a series of combined-arms battles between Allied and Japanese forces in the Solomon Islands area.

== Background ==
On 7 December 1941, the Japanese attacked the U.S. Pacific fleet at Pearl Harbor, Hawaii, initiating a state of war between the two nations. The attack crippled much of the U.S. battleship fleet. The initial goals of Japanese leaders in the war were to neutralize the U.S. fleet, seize possessions rich in natural resources, and establish strategic military bases to defend Japan's empire in Asia and the Pacific. In support of these goals, Japanese forces attacked and took control of the Philippines, Thailand, Malaya, Singapore, the Dutch East Indies, Wake Island, Gilbert Islands, New Britain, and Guam.

Two attempts by the Japanese to extend their defensive perimeter in the south and central Pacific were thwarted in the battles of Coral Sea (May 1942) and Midway (June). These two strategic victories for the Allies provided them with an opportunity to take the initiative and launch an offensive against the Japanese somewhere in the Pacific. The Allies chose the Solomon Islands, specifically the southern Solomon Islands of Guadalcanal, Tulagi, and Florida as the location for their first offensive.

As part of an operation that resulted in the Coral Sea battle, the Japanese Navy sent troops to occupy Tulagi and nearby islands in the southern Solomons. These troops—mainly members of the Kure 3rd Special Naval Landing Force (SNLF)—occupied Tulagi on 3 May and constructed a seaplane, ship refueling, and communications base on Tulagi and the nearby islands of Gavutu, Tanambogo and Florida, all of which were soon operational. The bulk of the Kure 3rd SNLF departed Tulagi later in May, leaving a company of men under Special Duty Lt.(jg) Kakichi Yoshimoto behind for garrison duties. On 1 July these remnants of the Kure 3rd SNLF and another company from the 81st Guard Unit were reorganized to form the new 84th Guard Unit. Their newly appointed commander Masaaki Suzuki and 150 men of his men were headquartered on Tulagi, with 50 more stationed on Gavutu, and 200 detached on Guadalcanal. Aware of the Japanese efforts on Tulagi, the Allies' concern increased in early July when the Japanese Navy began constructing a large airfield near Lunga Point on nearby Guadalcanal. By August, the Japanese had about 900 troops on Tulagi and nearby islands, and 2,800 personnel (many of whom were Korean and Japanese construction specialists and laborers) on Guadalcanal. The airfield—when complete—would protect Japan's major base at Rabaul, threaten Allied supply and communication lines, and establish a staging area for the planned future offensives against Fiji, New Caledonia, and Samoa.

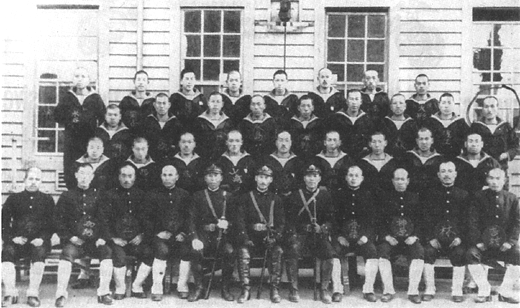
Headquarters of the Kure 3rd Special Naval Landing Force 3rd Company which participated in the capture of Tulagi in May 1942. Special Duty Lt.(jg) Kakichi Yoshimoto—who temporarily served as commander of the Tulagi Garrison—is seated in the center of the front row. Yoshimoto and most if not all the men pictured were killed during the fighting on 7–9 August 1942.

The Allied plan to attack the southern Solomons was conceived by U.S. Admiral Ernest King, Commander in Chief, United States Fleet. He proposed the offensive to deny the use of the southern Solomon Islands by the Japanese as bases to threaten the supply routes between the U.S. and Australia, and to use them as starting points for a campaign with the objective of capturing or neutralizing the major Japanese base at Rabaul while also supporting the Allied New Guinea campaign, with the eventual goal of opening the way for the U.S. to retake the Philippines. U.S. Admiral Chester Nimitz, Allied commander-in-chief for Pacific forces, created the South Pacific theater with U.S. Vice Admiral Robert L. Ghormley in command, to direct the Allied offensive in the Solomons.

Admiral Nimitz had proposed that the 1st Raiders do a raid on the seaplane base at Tulagi in May 1942; however, Generals Marshall and MacArthur as well as Admiral King believed a single battalion was too small for the landing.

In preparation for the offensive, in May, U.S. Major General Alexander Vandegrift was ordered to move his 1st Marine Division from the U.S. to New Zealand. Other Allied land, naval, and air force units were sent to establish bases in Fiji, Samoa, and New Caledonia. Espiritu Santo in the New Hebrides was selected as the headquarters and main base for the impending offensive—codenamed Operation Watchtower—with the commencement date set for 7 August. At first, the Allied offensive was planned just for Tulagi and the Santa Cruz Islands, omitting Guadalcanal. However, after Allied reconnaissance discovered the Japanese airfield construction efforts on Guadalcanal, capturing that airfield was added to the plan, and the Santa Cruz operation was dropped.

The Allied Watchtower expeditionary force of 75 warships and transports, which included vessels from both the U.S. and Australia, assembled near Fiji on 26 July, and engaged in one rehearsal landing prior to leaving for Guadalcanal on 31 July. Vandegrift was the overall commander of the 16,000 Allied (primarily U.S. Marine) ground forces involved in the landings and personally commanded the assault on Guadalcanal. In command of the 3,000 U.S. Marines set to land on Tulagi and the nearby islands of Florida, Gavutu, and Tanambogo was U.S. Brigadier General William H. Rupertus on the transport ship USS Neville.

== Prelude ==
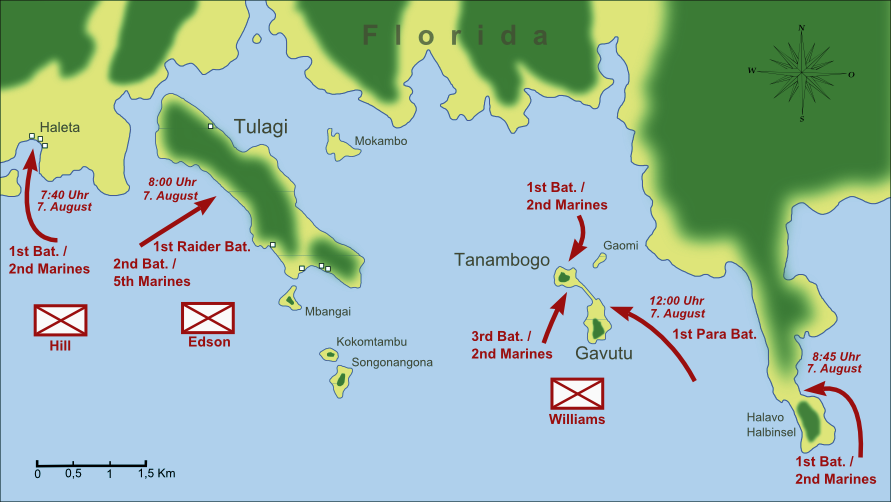
Routes of Allied amphibious forces for landings on Florida, Tulagi, and Gavutu–Tanambogo, 7 August 1942

Bad weather allowed the Allied expeditionary force to arrive in the vicinity of Guadalcanal unseen by the Japanese on the morning of 7 August. The Japanese detected the radio traffic from the incoming Allied invasion force and prepared to send scout aircraft aloft at daybreak. The landing force ships split into two groups, with one group assigned for the assault on Guadalcanal and the other tasked with the assault on Tulagi, Florida, and Gavutu–Tanambogo. Aircraft from the aircraft carrier USS Wasp dive-bombed Japanese installations on Tulagi, Gavutu, Tanambogo, and Florida and strafed and destroyed 15 Japanese seaplanes floating in the anchorages near the islands. Several of the seaplanes were warming their engines in preparation for takeoff and were lost with their aircrews and many of their support personnel.

The cruiser USS San Juan and destroyers Monssen and Buchanan bombarded planned landing sites on Tulagi and Florida Island. To cover the assaults on Tulagi, Gavutu, and Tanambogo, U.S. Marines from the 1st Battalion, 2nd Marine Regiment made an unopposed landing on Florida Island at 07:40. They were guided to their objective by several Australians, such as Lieutenant Frank Stackpool (later Captain, British Solomon Islands Protectorate Defence Force), who were familiar with the Tulagi-Florida area from having previously lived and worked in the area.

== Battle ==
=== Tulagi ===
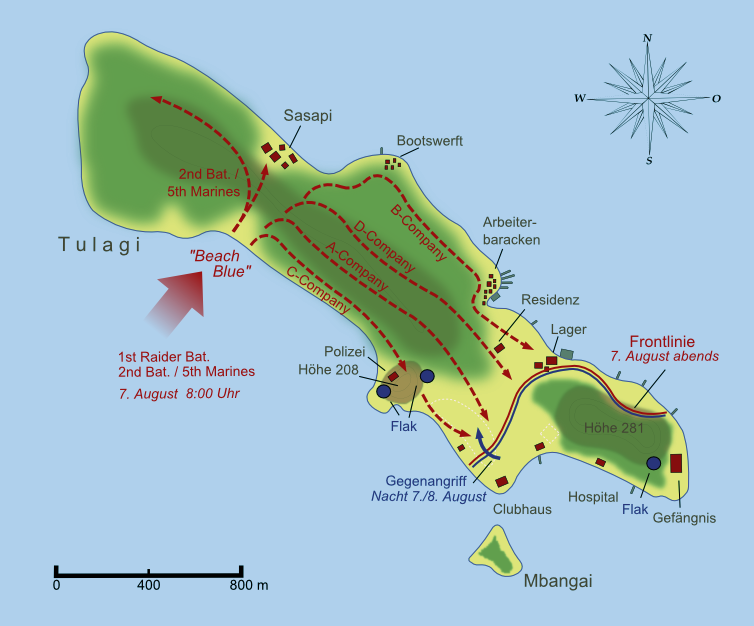
Landings on and engagements across Tulagi

At 08:00 on 7 August, two battalions of U.S. Marines, including the 1st Raider Battalion under Colonel Merritt A. Edson (Edson's Raiders), and the 2nd Battalion, 5th Marines (2/5) under Lieutenant Colonel Harold E. Rosecrans made an unopposed landing on the western shore of Tulagi about halfway between the two ends of the oblong-shaped island. Beds of coral near the shore kept the landing craft from reaching the shoreline. The Marines, however, were able to wade the remaining 100 m (110 yd) without hindrance from the Japanese forces, who were apparently taken by surprise by the landings and had yet to begin any organized resistance. At this time, the Japanese forces on Tulagi and Gavutu, a detachment of the 84th Guard Unit plus members of the Yokohama Air Group, commanded by Captain Shigetoshi Miyazaki, signaled their commander at Rabaul, Rear Admiral Sadayoshi Yamada, that they were under attack, were destroying their equipment and papers, and signed off with the message, "Enemy troop strength is overwhelming, We will defend to the last man." Commander Masaaki Suzuki, commander of the Guard Unit, ordered his troops into prepared defensive positions on Tulagi and Gavutu.

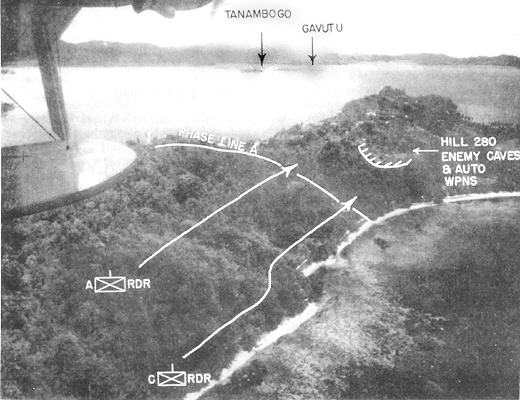
Map overlay on an aerial photo of Tulagi showing U.S. Marine advance on the southeastern end of the island and the center of Japanese resistance around Hill 280

Marines of 2/5 secured the northwest end of Tulagi without opposition and then joined Edson's Raiders in their advance towards the southeastern end of the island. The Marines advanced towards the southeast throughout the day while defeating a few isolated pockets of Japanese resistance. Around noon, Suzuki repositioned his main defenses into a line 9°6′26″S 160°8′56″E on a hill—called Hill 281 (Hill 280 in some sources) by U.S. forces based on its elevation—and a nearby ravine at the southeast end of the island. The Japanese defenses included dozens of tunneled caves dug into the hill's limestone cliffs and machinegun pits protected by sandbags. The Marines reached these defenses near dusk, realized they did not have enough daylight left for a full-scale attack, and dug in for the night.

During the night, the Japanese attacked the Marine lines five times, beginning at 22:30. The attacks consisted of frontal charges along with individual and small group infiltration efforts towards Edson's command post, at times resulting in hand to hand combat. The Japanese temporarily broke through the Marine lines and captured a machine gun but were quickly thrown back. After taking a few more casualties, the Marine lines held throughout the rest of the night. The Japanese suffered heavy losses in the attacks. During the night, one Marine—Edward H. Ahrens—killed 13 Japanese who assaulted his position before he was killed. Describing the Japanese attacks that night, eyewitness raider Marine Pete Sparacino said:

... full darkness set in. There was movement to the front ... you could hear them jabbering. Then, the enemy found a gap and began running through the opening. The gap was (sealed) when another squad closed the gate. Some Japanese had crawled within 20 yards of (Frank) Guidone's squad. Frank began throwing grenades from a prone position. His grenades were going off 15 yards from our position (and) we had to duck as they exploded. The enemy was all around. It was brutal and deadly. We had to be careful not to kill our comrades. We were tired but had to stay awake or be dead.

At daybreak on 8 August, six Japanese infiltrators hiding under the porch of the former British colonial headquarters shot and killed three Marines. Within five minutes, other Marines killed the six Japanese with grenades. Later that morning, the Marines, after landing reinforcements from 2nd Battalion, 2nd Marines (2/2), surrounded Hill 281 and the ravine, pounded both locations with mortar fire throughout the morning, and then assaulted the two positions, using improvised explosive charges to kill the Japanese defenders taking cover in the many caves and fighting positions throughout the hill and ravine. The individual Japanese fighting positions were destroyed with these improvised explosives. Significant Japanese resistance ended by the afternoon, although a few stragglers were found and killed over the next several days. In the battle for Tulagi, 307 Japanese and 45 U.S. troops died. Three Japanese soldiers were taken prisoner.

=== Gavutu–Tanambogo ===
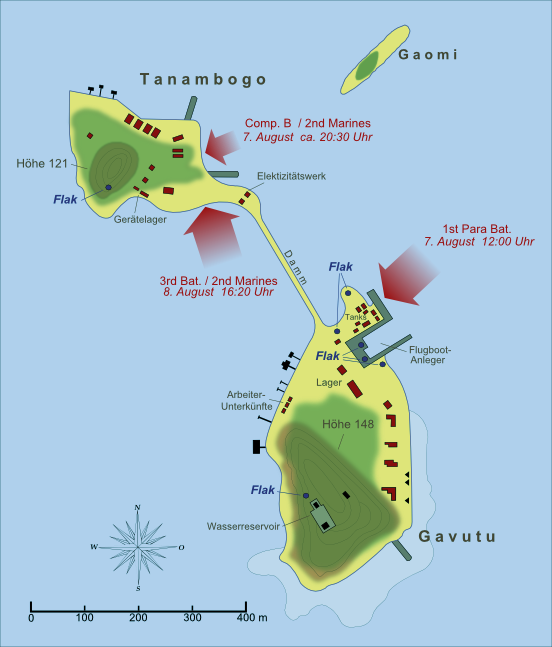
Landings on Gavutu and Tanambogo

The nearby islets of Gavutu and Tanambogo housed the Japanese seaplane base as well as 536 Japanese naval personnel from the Yokohama Air Group and 84th Guard Unit, as well as Korean and Japanese civilian technicians and laborers from the 14th Construction Unit. The two islets were basically mounds of coral—both about 42 m (138 ft) high—linked by a 500 m (1,600 ft)-long causeway. The hills on Gavutu and Tanambogo were called Hills 148 and 121 respectively by the Americans because of their height in feet. The Japanese on both islets were well entrenched in bunkers and caves constructed on and in the two hills. Also, the two islets were mutually supportive since each was in machine gun range of the other. The U.S. mistakenly believed the islets were garrisoned by only 200 naval troops and construction workers.

At 12:00 on 7 August, Gavutu was assaulted by the U.S. Marine 1st Parachute Battalion consisting of 397 men. The assault was scheduled for noon because there were not enough aircraft to provide air cover for the Guadalcanal, Tulagi, and Gavutu landings at the same time. The preceding naval bombardment had damaged the seaplane ramp, forcing the naval landing craft to land the Marines in a more exposed location on a nearby small beach and dock at 9°6′53″S 160°11′19″E. Japanese machine gun fire began inflicting heavy casualties, killing or wounding one in ten of the landing Marines as they scrambled inland in an attempt to get out of the crossfire coming from the two islets.

Surviving Marines were able to deploy two M1919 Browning machine guns to provide suppressive fire on Gavutu's caves, allowing more Marines to push inland from the landing area. Seeking cover, the Marines became scattered and were quickly pinned down. Captain George Stallings, the battalion operations officer, directed Marines to begin suppressive fire with machine guns and mortars on the Japanese machine gun emplacements on Tanambogo. Shortly thereafter, American dive bombers dropped several bombs on Tanambogo, diminishing some of the volume of fire from that location.

After about two hours, Marines reached and climbed Hill 148. Working from the top, the Marines began clearing the Japanese fighting positions on the hill, most of which still remained, with explosive charges, grenades, and hand-to-hand combat. From the top of the hill, the Marines were also able to put increased suppressive fire on Tanambogo. The Marine battalion commander on Gavutu radioed General Rupertus with a request for reinforcements before attempting to assault Tanambogo.

Most of the 240 Japanese defenders on Tanambogo were aircrew and maintenance personnel from the Yokohama Air Group. Many of these were aircraft maintenance personnel and construction units not equipped for combat. One of the few Japanese soldiers captured recounts fighting armed with only hand sickles and poles. Rupertus detached one company of Marines from the 1st Battalion, 2nd Marine Regiment on Florida Island to assist in assaulting Tanambogo, in spite of advice from his staff that one company was not enough. Incorrectly believing Tanambogo to be only lightly defended, this company attempted a direct amphibious assault shortly after dark on 7 August. Illuminated by fires started during a U.S. naval bombardment of the islet, the five landing craft carrying the Marines were hit by heavy fire as they approached the shore. Many of the crewmen were killed or wounded and three of the boats were heavily damaged. Realizing the position was untenable, the Marine company commander ordered the remaining boats to depart with the wounded Marines, and he and 12 men who had already landed sprinted across the causeway to cover on Gavutu. The Japanese on Tanambogo suffered 10 killed in the day's fighting.

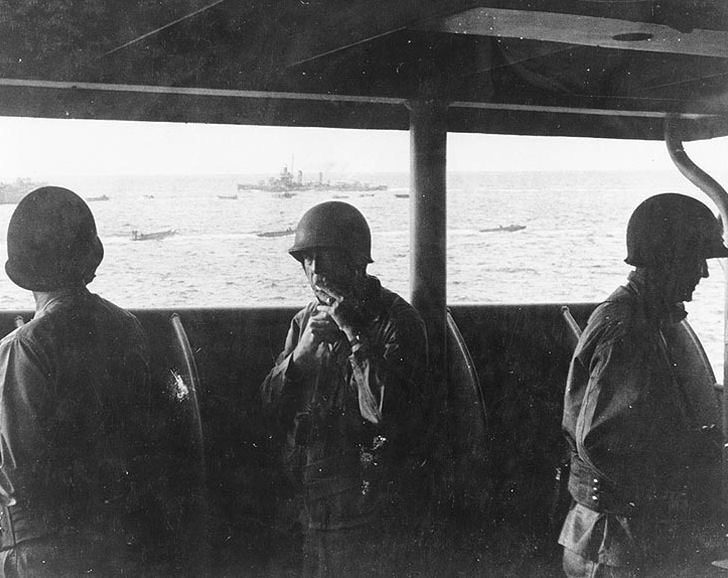
U.S. Brigadier General Rupertus (center) supervises the assaults on Tulagi, Gavutu, and Tanambogo from his command ship on 7 or 8 August. In the background are landing craft and a U.S. destroyer.

Throughout the night, as the Japanese staged isolated attacks on the Marines on Gavutu under the concealment of heavy thunderstorms, Vandegrift prepared to send reinforcements to assist with the assault on Tanambogo. The 3rd Battalion, 2nd Marines (3/2), still embarked on ships off Guadalcanal, was notified to prepare to assault Tanambogo on 8 August.

The 3/2 began landing on Gavutu at 10:00 on 8 August and assisted in destroying the remaining Japanese defenses on that islet, which was completed by 12:00. Then 3/2 prepared to assault Tanambogo. The Marines on Gavutu provided covering fire for the attack. In preparation for the assault, U.S. carrier-based dive bombers and naval gunfire bombardment were requested. After the carrier aircraft twice accidentally dropped bombs on Marines on Gavutu, killing four, further carrier aircraft support was canceled. San Juan, however, placed its shells on the correct island and shelled Tanambogo for 30 minutes. The Marine assault began at 16:15, both by landing craft and from across the causeway, and, with assistance from two Marine Stuart light tanks, began making headway against the Japanese defenses. One of the tanks got stuck on a stump. Isolated from its infantry support, it was surrounded by a group of about 50 Japanese airmen. Setting fire to the tank, they killed two of its crew and severely beat the other two crewmembers before most of them were killed by Marine rifle fire. The Marines later counted 42 Japanese bodies around the burned-out hulk of the tank, including the corpses of the Yokohama executive officer and several of the seaplane pilots. One of the Japanese survivors of the attack on the tank reported, "I recall seeing my officer, Lieutenant Commander Saburo Katsuta of the Yokohama Air Group, on top of the tank. This was the last time I saw him". The overall commander of troops on Tanambogo was Captain (naval rank) Shigetoshi Miyazaki who blew himself up inside his dugout on the late afternoon of 8 August.

Throughout the day, the Marines methodically dynamited the caves, destroying most of them by 21:00. The few surviving Japanese conducted isolated attacks throughout the night, with hand to hand engagements occurring. By noon on 9 August, all Japanese resistance on Tanambogo ended. In the battle for Gavutu and Tanambogo, 476 Japanese defenders and 70 U.S. Marines or naval personnel died. Of the 20 Japanese prisoners taken during the battle, most were not actually Japanese combatants but Korean laborers belonging to the Japanese construction unit.

=== Landings on Guadalcanal ===
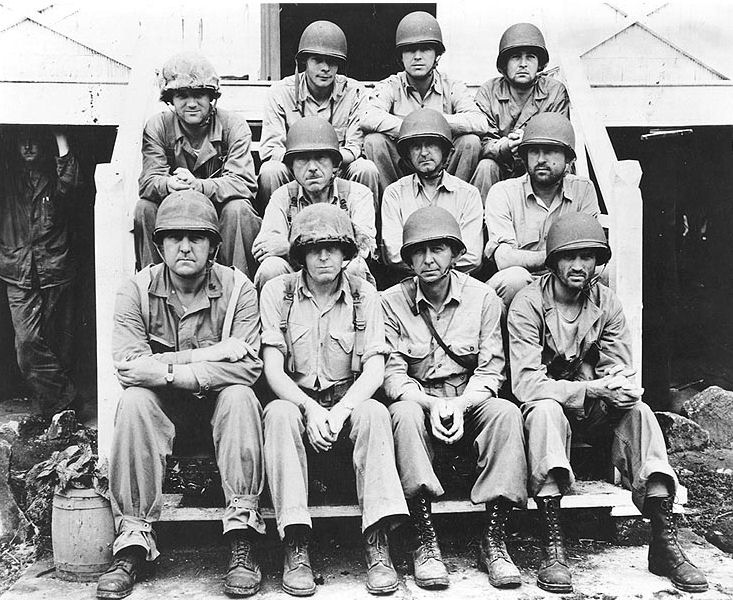
The U.S. Marine officers commanding the units that assaulted Tulagi pose for a group photo shortly after the battle.

In contrast to Tulagi, Gavutu, and Tanambogo, the landings on Guadalcanal encountered much less resistance. At 09:10 on 7 August, General Vandegrift and 11,000 U.S. Marines came ashore on Guadalcanal between Koli Point and Lunga Point. Advancing towards Lunga Point, they encountered no resistance except for "tangled" rain forest, and halted for the night about 1,000 m (1,100 yd) from the Lunga Point airfield. The next day, again against little resistance, the Marines advanced all the way to the Lunga River and secured the airfield by 16:00 on 8 August. The Japanese naval construction units had abandoned the airfield area, leaving behind food, supplies, and intact construction equipment and vehicles.

== Aftermath ==
During the battle, about 80 Japanese escaped from Tulagi and Gavutu–Tanambogo by swimming to Florida Island. They were, however, all hunted down and killed by Marine and British Solomon Islands Protectorate Defence Force patrols over the next two months.

The Allies quickly turned the Tulagi anchorage, one of the finest natural harbors in the South Pacific, into a naval base and refueling station. During the Guadalcanal and Solomon Islands campaigns, Tulagi served as an important base for Allied naval operations. Since the Japanese exerted control over the nearby seas at night throughout the Guadalcanal campaign, any Allied ships in the Guadalcanal area that could not depart by nightfall often took refuge in Tulagi's harbor. Allied ships damaged in the naval battles that occurred between August and December in the vicinity of Guadalcanal usually anchored in Tulagi's harbor for temporary repairs before heading to rear-area ports for permanent repairs.

Later in the campaign, Tulagi also became a base for U.S. PT boats that attempted to interdict "Tokyo Express" missions by the Japanese to resupply and reinforce their forces on Guadalcanal. A seaplane base was also established on nearby Florida Island. Except for some troops left to build, garrison, operate, and defend the base at Tulagi, however, the majority of the U.S. Marines who had assaulted Tulagi and the nearby islets were relocated to Guadalcanal to help defend the airfield, later called Henderson Field by Allied forces, located at Lunga Point.

The U.S. Navy escort carrier USS Tulagi—in commission from 1943 to 1946—was named for the fighting on Tulagi.
