= 3rd Pioneer Battalion =

3rd Pioneer Battalion may refer to:

- 3rd Pioneer Battalion (Australia): a unit of the Australian Army that served during the First World War
- 2/3rd Pioneer Battalion (Australia): a unit of the Australian Army that served during the Second World War
- 3rd Combat Engineer Battalion: a United States Marine Corps unit, which was originally designated as the 3rd Pioneer Battalion
