= 19th Marine Regiment (United States) =

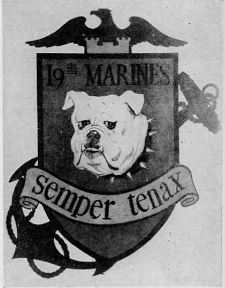
- 19th Marines
- Active: 16 September 1942 – 7 September 1944
- Country: United States of America
- Branch: United States Marine Corps
- Type: Engineer Regiment
- Part of: 3rd Marine Division
- Mottos: Latin: Semper Tenax; "always holding fast"
- Engagements: World War II: Battle of Bougainville; Battle of Guam

Commanders
- Notable commanders: Colonel Robert M. Montage; Lieutenant Colonel Robert E. Fojt

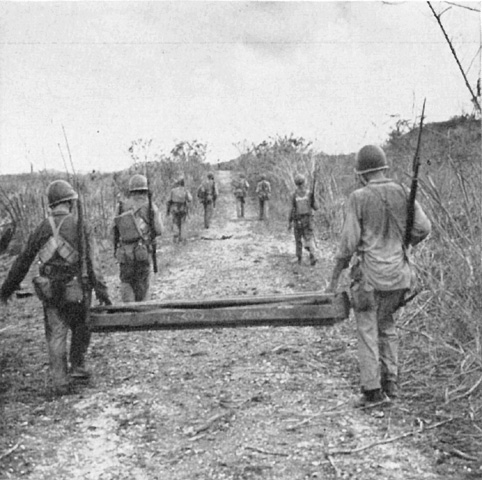
19th Marines carry a bangalore mine towards a cave reported by the 21st Marine on Guam

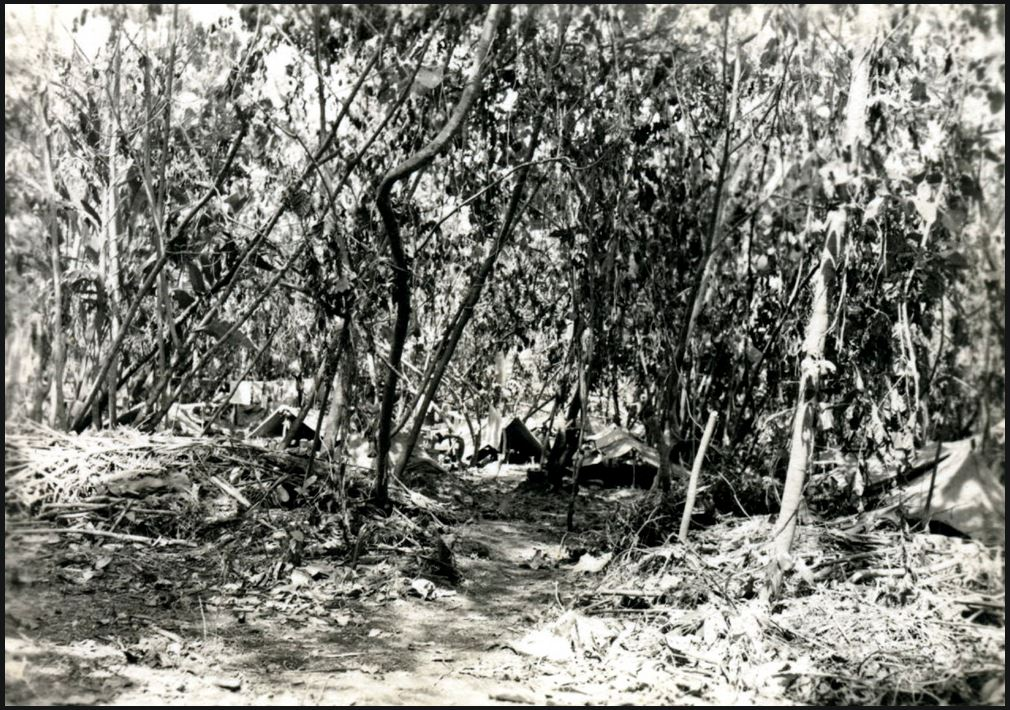
Third Battalion 19th Marines (25th NCB) tent camp on Bougainville

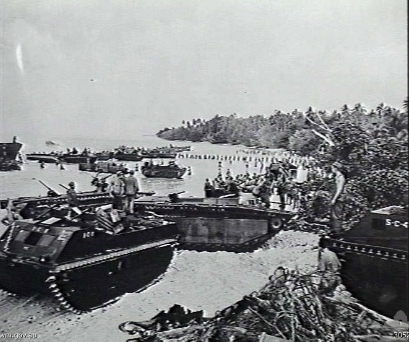
Landing on Emirau AWM305252

The 19th Marine Regiment was a composite engineer regiment of the United States Marine Corps subordinate to the 3rd Marine Division. It existed from September 1942 until September 1944. In December 1943 there was a large change of command in the regiment. Marine engineer regiments were eventually disbanded in favor of independent engineering battalions within the parent Marine divisions.

== Subordinate units ==
The regiment was a composite of three different types of battalions and a headquarters and service company:

- 1st Battalion, 19th Marines, A, B, & C Companies 3rd Engineer Battalion now 3rd Combat Engineer Battalion
- 2nd Battalion, 19th Marines, D, E, & F Companies 3rd Pioneer Battalion now Combat Logistics Regiment 3
- 3rd Battalion, 19th Marines, G, H, & I Companies 25th Naval Construction Battalion

== History ==
World War II

Assigned to the 3rd Marine Division, on 11 March 1943 Col Robert M. Montaque took command of the regiment in New Zealand. September 1943 saw the regiment land in the Bougainville campaign on that island. The seabees bulldozed paths through the jungle for tanks to attack the Japanese lines. C. Company with other 19th Marines built a corduroy road for tanks and supply movement for the 7th marines. Companies C, F, & I were attached to the 3rd RCT while Companies A, D, & G were attached to the 9th RCT. From there it went to Guadalcanal in preparation for the Battle of Guam (1944). It landed in the assault on Guam with Companies C, F, & I attached to the 3rd Marine Regimental Combat Team, Companies A, D, & G attached to the 9th Marine Regimental Combat Team and Companies B, E, & H attached to the 21st Marine Regimental Combat Team. The regiment was decommissioned on 17 August. Naval Construction Battalion 25 was returned to the Navy and assigned to the 5th Naval Construction Brigade, remaining on Guam until the war ended, and now located on Naval Base Ventura County Port Hueneme .

With the inactivation of the 19th Marine Regiment the 3rd Engineer Battalion and the 3rd Pioneer Battalion were posted directly to the 3rd Marine Division. The 25th Naval Construction Battalion was replaced by the 62nd Naval Construction Battalion which was attached directly to the V Amphibious Corps for the Battle of Iwo Jima. The 3rd Pioneers landed on yellow 2 beach on D-plus 3 and remained there until D-plus 6. On D-plus 6 black beach was created and the pioneers moved there as did the 3rd Engineers. The 62nd NCB was made the lead Battalion for getting Motoyama Airfield #1 operational in place of the 133rd NCB which had taken heavy casualties.

- 3rd Marine Division Order of Battle for Bougainville Campaign,1 November–15 December 1943
  - 3rd Marine Regimental Combat Team - C, F, & I Companies 19th Marines
  - 9th Marine Regimental Combat Team - A, D, & G Companies 19th Marines
  - 21st Marine Regimental Combat Team -B, E, & H Companies 19th Marines (assault reserve)
- Solomon Islands campaign:- 15 December 1943 – 9 January 1944
- 3rd Marine Division Order of Battle for Emirau March 1944
  - 4th Marine Regimental Combat Team - Pioneer Company 2d Bn 19th Marines
- 3rd Marine Division Order of Battle of Guam, 21 July–15 August 1944
  - 9th Marine Regimental Combat Team - A, D, & G Companies 19th Marines
  - 21st Marine Regimental Combat Team -B, E, & H Companies 19th Marines
  - 3rd Marine Regimental Combat Team - C, F, & I Companies 19th Marines (assault reserve)

Command officer history

| Regimental post | Officer | Period |
|---|---|---|
| Commanding Officer | Colonel Robert M. Montague | Sept 1942-Dec 1943 |
| " " | Lt. Col Robert E. Fojt | Dec 1943-Sept 1944 |
| Executive Officer | Lt. Col Robert E. Fojt | Sept 1942-Dec 1943 |
| " " | Major William D Jewett | Dec 1943-Sept 1944 |
| R1 | Major William D Jewett | Sept 1942-Dec 1943 |
| " " | Major George D. Flood | Dec 1943-Sept 1944 |
| R2 & R3 | Captain Minstree Folkes Jr. | |
| R4 | Major Virgil M. Davis | |
| 1st BN Commander | Major Ralph W. Bohme | |
| Executive Officer | Captain Kenneth M King | |
| 2nd BN Commander | Lt. Colonel Harold b. West | Sept 1942-Dec 1943 |
| " " | Major Halstad Ellison | Dec 1943-Sept 1944 |
| Executive Officer | Captain Victor J. Simpson | |
| 3rd BN Commander | Captain Charles E Ingram CEC USN | Sept 1942-Dec 1943 |
| " " | Captain James R. Ovington CEC USN | Dec 1943-Sept 1944 |
| 3rd BN Liaison | Captain Joseph W. Beckenstrater | |

== Unit awards ==
- Navy Unit Commendation,3rd Marine Regiment(and all units attached to or serving with), Company C 19th Marines, Bougainville
- Navy Unit Commendation, 21st Marine Regiment(and all units attached to or serving with), Company B 19th Marines, Guam
- Presidential Unit Citation, 3rd Marine Regiment(and all units attached to or serving with), Company C 19th Marines, Guam

"Naval Unit Commendation,
3d Marines
The Secretary of the Navy takes pleasure in commending the

THIRD MARINES, THIRD MARINE DIVISION
for service as follows:

"For outstanding heroism in action against enemy Japanese forces during the invasion, seizure, occupation and defense of Empress Augusta Bay Beachhead, Bougainville, Solomon Islands, from November 1 to December 22, 1943. In action against the enemy for the first time, the THIRD Marines landed on an extremely wide front in the face of perilous surf and beach conditions and through flanking fire of hostile machine guns, anti-boat guns, mortars, small arms and artillery from heavily entrenched positions on Cape Torokina and Puruata Island. Pressing forward through almost impenetrable jungle and swampy terrain, this Regiment completely reduced the intricate system of mutually supporting Japanese pillboxes, bunkers, fire trenches and foxholes which constituted the Cape Torokina defense, and secured its portion of the objective by evening of D-Day. Shifted to the left flank of the beachhead, the THIRD Marines smashed a Japanese counter-landing and drove steadily forward despite difficulties of terrain, supply and communication and, developing the main enemy position in a meeting engagement on the Numa. Numa trail, completely wiped out the Japanese 23rd Infantry. In continuous action as a front line regiment for a total of fifty-two consecutive days, the gallant men and officers of the THIRD Marines, by their skill in jungle warfare and their aggressive fighting spirit, contributed greatly to the success of the campaign and enhanced the highest traditions of the United States Naval Service."

All personnel attached to and serving with the THIRD Marines at Bougainville from November 1 to December 22, 1943, are authorized to wear the NAVY UNIT COMMENDATION Ribbon.

JAMES FORRESTAL, Secretary of the Navy"

== See also ==
- History of the United States Marine Corps
- Landing on Emirau
- List of United States Marine Corps regiments
- Naval Mobile Construction Battalion 25
- Organization of the United States Marine Corps
- 3rd Marine Division
- 16th Marine Regiment(Engineer)
- 17th Marine Regiment(Engineer)
- 18th Marine Regiment(Engineer)
- 20th Marine Regiment(Engineer)
- Seabees
