= Harold E. Rosecrans =

United States Marine Corps general

Harold Ellett Rosecrans
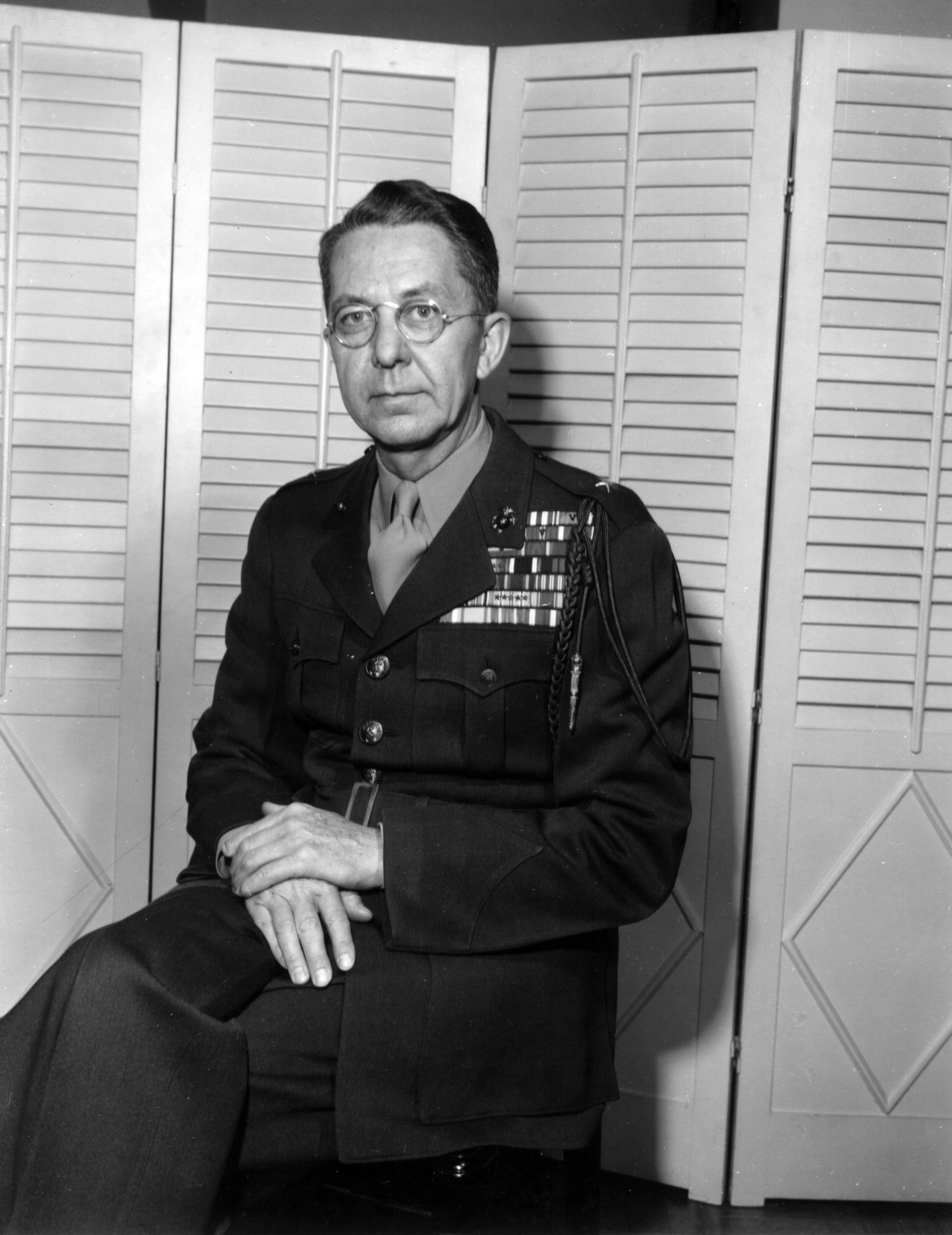
- Harold E. Rosecrans as brigadier general, USMC.
- Born: March 1, 1897; Cohoes, New York, US
- Died: April 13, 1980 (aged 83); Daytona Beach, Florida, US
- Burial place: Arlington National Cemetery
- Military career
- Allegiance: United States
- Branch: United States Marine Corps
- Service years: 1917–1949
- Rank: Brigadier general
- Service number: 0-846
- Commands: 17th Marine Regiment; 2nd Battalion 5th Marines; QM of I Marine Amphibious Corps; Marine Corps Institute
- Conflicts: World War I: Battle of Belleau Wood; Battle of Saint-Mihiel; Battle of Blanc Mont Ridge; Meuse-Argonne Offensive; Haitian Campaign; Dominican Campaign; Yangtze Patrol; Nicaraguan Campaign World War II: Battle of Guadalcanal; Battle of Tulagi; Solomon Islands campaign; New Britain campaign; Battle of Cape Gloucester; Battle of Okinawa
- Awards: Silver Star; Legion of Merit; Bronze Star Medal; Purple Heart (2)

Harold Ellett Rosecrans (March 1, 1897 – April 13, 1980) was a highly decorated officer of the United States Marine Corps with the rank of brigadier general, who commanded 2nd Battalion 5th Marines during the assault on Tulagi Island. He later commanded 17th Marine Regiment during Battle of Cape Gloucester.

== Early years ==
Rosecrans was born to machinist Benjamin Rosecrans Jr. and his wife Mary Ellett on March 1, 1897, in Cohoes, New York. Following his high school graduation and United States entry into World War I, Rosecrans went to Albany, New York, and enlisted to the Marine Corps on April 20, 1917. He attended his basic training at Marine barracks within Philadelphia Navy Yard and subsequently was assigned to 23rd Company, 2nd Battalion, 5th Marine Regiment on June 3, 1917. Rosecrans and his unit were deployed to France on June 27, and, while most of his company was used to form 6th Machine Gun Battalion, he was transferred to the 55th Company, 2nd Battalion at the end of August.

The 55th Company was sent to the trenches in [Toulon?] sector in March 1918, and Rosecrans participated in several defensive actions there. He was promoted to the rank of corporal on April 5, 1918, and also received Marine Corps Good Conduct Medal for his enlisted service. While he participated in the Battle of Belleau Wood in June 1918, Rosecrans was wounded by enemy fire on June 7 and sent to field hospital for treatment. After his recovery, he was assigned to the Replacement Battalion on June 30, before he was transferred back to his 55th Company at the end of August 1918.

He subsequently participated in the Battle of Saint-Mihiel, Battle of Blanc Mont Ridge and Meuse-Argonne Offensive, and, after the Armistice, he served with the Occupation Forces during the Allied occupation of the Rhineland. While stationed in Germany, Rosecrans was appointed second lieutenant in the Marine Corps Reserve on March 10, 1919. He also received Fourragère for his service in World War I by the Government of France.

== Interwar period ==
Rosecrans and his unit were ordered back to the United States in August 1919 and stationed at Marine Barracks Quantico, where he attended the School of Application. He was subsequently commissioned second lieutenant in the regular Marine Corps and assigned to the Second Brigade of Marines. Rosecrans sailed for Haiti and subsequently also for Dominican Republic and participated in the marine expeditionary duties in these countries.

He remained in the Caribbean until July 1922, when he was ordered back to Quantico and then to the Marine barracks within Naval Submarine Base New London, where he served until March 1926. During his time in New London base, Rosecrans was promoted to the rank of first lieutenant in December 1923. His next assignment was with Marine Corps Base San Diego, where he stayed until May 1926, when he was assigned to the Marine detachment aboard the gunboat USS Sacramento. Rosecrans then sailed for Yantai, China, and served with Third Brigade of Marines until he was ordered for a brief period to Marine Barracks at Naval Station Olongapo, Philippines. He served there until May 1929, when he was assigned to Fourth Brigade of Marines and sailed for shore duty in Shanghai, China.

His service in Shanghai lasted just until July 1929, when he was ordered back to the United States. Rosecrans was assigned to the Marine barracks in San Francisco, California, within the Department of Pacific and later transferred to the Marine barracks at Puget Sound Navy Yard in August 1929.

Rosecrans sailed to Nicaragua in July 1930 and subsequently served with Guardia Nacional during the skirmishes with the rebels. For his service in Nicaragua, he was decorated with the Nicaraguan Cross of Valor with Diploma by the Government of Nicaragua. He remained there until March 1932, when he was assigned to the Marine barracks at Norfolk Navy Yard. However, Rosecrans was transferred again in May 1932, now to the Marine Barracks Quantico, where he was appointed range officer of the rifle range detachment.

In June 1933, Rosecrans was promoted to the rank of captain and transferred to Washington, D.C., where he was appointed instructor within 5th Battalion, 6th Reserve Marine Brigade. He also served simultaneously as aide at the White House and was sent for Company Officers Course at Marine Corps School at Quantico base.

He was transferred to San Diego, California, in June 1937 and appointed aide-de-camp to the Commanding General Fleet Marine Force, Major general Louis M. Little. While served in this capacity, Rosecrans was promoted to the rank of major in September 1938. He was subsequently appointed executive officer within 6th Marine Regiment and later assigned to the Senior Course at Marine Corps School at Quantico in August 1939.

After his graduation from the course, Rosecrans was transferred to the Marine Barracks, Washington, D.C. and appointed director of Marine Corps Institute. He also served as editor of the Leatherneck Magazine.

== World War II ==
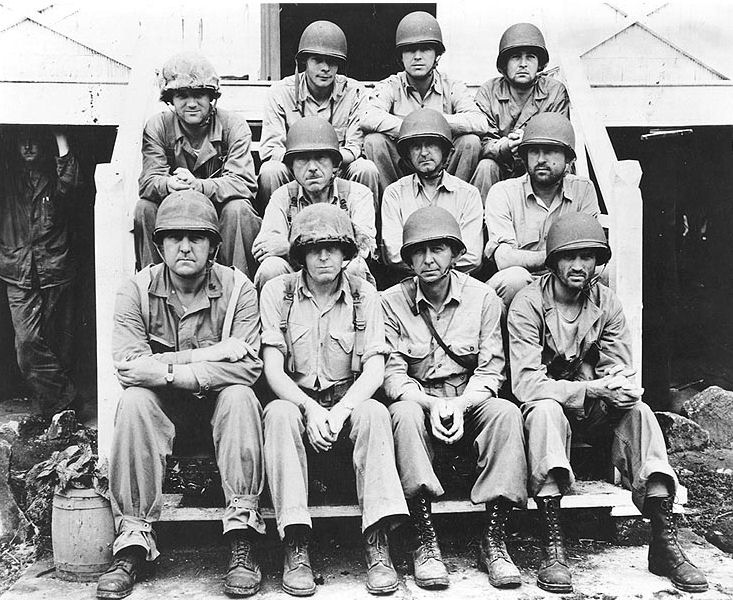
Marine Officers of Tulagi Operation. Rosecrans is in the front row, second from right. Next to him on the left is Merritt A. Edson.

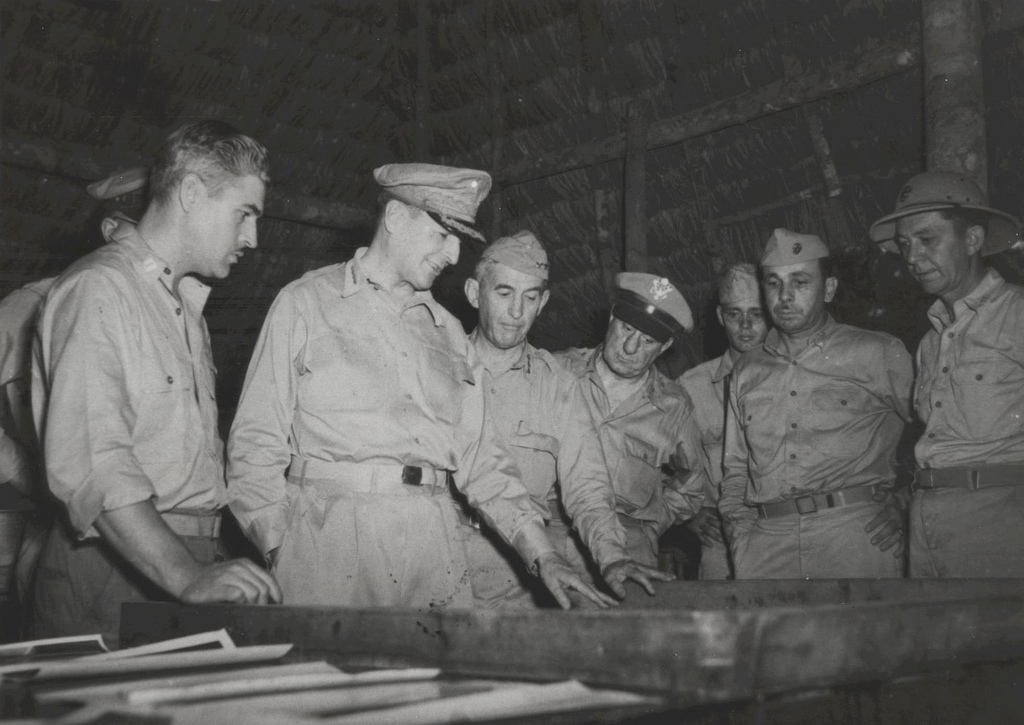
Rosecrans (first from right) looks on General Douglas MacArthur studying a map of Cape Gloucester.

Following the Japanese Attack on Pearl Harbor, Rosecrans was transferred to 5th Marine Regiment located in New River, North Carolina, in March 1942 and succeeded Lieutenant Colonel William J. Whaling as commanding officer of 2nd Battalion on March 28. The 5th Marine Regiment sailed to South Pacific aboard transport ship USS Wakefield and reached Wellington, New Zealand, in June 1942. Rosecrans was already promoted to the rank of lieutenant colonel in January 1942.

At the beginning of August 1942, Rosecrans received orders to capture the Tulagi Island held by Japanese Forces. The 2nd Battalion landed on the morning of August 7 behind the 1st Marine Raider Battalion under Lieutenant Colonel Merritt A. Edson, and Rosecrans and his men subsequently repealed several Japanese attacks with the nightfall. In the evening of August 8, the Tulagi operation was declared successful, with 347 Japanese killed in action and another 3 surrendered. Marines from 2/5th Marines and 1st Raider Battalion lost 45 men. Rosecrans was subsequently decorated with the Silver Star for his leadership during the operation.

Rosecrans and his battalion left Tulagi on August 21 and rejoined the rest of 5th Marine Regiment at Guadalcanal. However, his unit was kept in reserve at Henderson Field. On 11 September 1942, Rosecrans was wounded by enemy air attack and sent to the rear for treatment. He handed temporary command to Captain Joseph J. Dudkowski, before Lieutenant Colonel Walter A. Reaves was appointed the battalion's commanding officer.

Upon his recovery, Rosecrans was promoted to the rank of colonel and appointed quartermaster of I Marine Amphibious Corps under Major General Clayton Barney Vogel for a brief period before he was ordered to take command of newly activated 17th Marine Regiment (Engineer) on January 21, 1943. He led this regiment during the Battle of Cape Gloucester and was relieved by Colonel Francis I. Fenton on February 19, 1944.

He was subsequently ordered back to the United States and assigned to Marine Corps Base Quantico, where he was appointed director of the Marine Corps Command & Staff School. Rosecrans remained in this capacity until November 1944, when he was transferred back to the Pacific and appointed commanding officer of the 7th Field Depot within III Marine Amphibious Corps. Rosecrans' unit was redesignated 7th Service Regiment, and he sailed with that unit to Okinawa in June 1945. His regiment consisted of engineer company, signal company, military police company, ordnance company, supply company, transport company and several Marine ammo companies. For his service on Okinawa, Rosecrans was decorated with the Bronze Star Medal with Combat "V".

== Later life ==
After the surrender of Japan in September 1945, Rosecrans led his regiment to China, where Civil war broke out. However, he was transferred to the staff of the III Marine Amphibious Corps in February and ordered back to the United States in May 1946. For his leadership of 7th Service Regiment in China, Rosecrans was decorated with the Legion of Merit with Combat "V". Following his arrival to the States, Colonel Rosecrans served for a brief period with Naval and Examination Board, before he was appointed commanding officer of the Marine barracks at Naval Gun Factory in Washington, D.C., at the beginning of August 1946.

Rosecrans served in this capacity until his retirement on June 30, 1949. He was advanced to the rank of brigadier general on the retired list for having been specially commended in combat. Rosecrans died on April 13, 1980, and is buried at Arlington National Cemetery in Virginia, together with his wife Dorothy Darling Rosecrans. Together they had one son, Robert D. Rosecrans (1928–1978), who also served with the Marines and retired as lieutenant colonel.

== Decorations ==

| 1st Row | Silver Star | | | |
| 2nd Row | Legion of Merit with Combat "V" | Bronze Star Medal with Combat "V" | Purple Heart with one 5/16" gold star | Marine Corps Good Conduct Medal |
| 3rd Row | Navy Presidential Unit Citation with one star | Navy Unit Commendation | Marine Corps Expeditionary Medal with one star | World War I Victory Medal with five battle clasps |
| 4th Row | Army of Occupation of Germany Medal | Haitian Campaign Medal | Yangtze Service Medal | Second Nicaraguan Campaign Medal |
| 5th Row | American Defense Service Medal | American Campaign Medal | Asiatic-Pacific Campaign Medal with five 3/16 inch service stars | World War II Victory Medal |
| 6th Row | Navy Occupation Service Medal | China Service Medal | Nicaraguan Cross of Valor with Diploma | Chinese Order of the Sacred Tripod, 6th Grade |

=== Silver Star citation ===
Citation:

The President of the United States of America takes pleasure in presenting the Silver Star to Lieutenant Colonel Harold E. Rosecrans (MCSN: 0-846), United States Marine Corps, for conspicuous gallantry and intrepidity as Commanding Officer of the Second Battalion, Fifth Marines, Reinforced, during the assault on Tulagi Island, British Solomon Islands, 7–9 August 1942. When fierce resistance from this Japanese stronghold necessitated the reinforcement of the First Marine Raider Battalion, Lieutenant Colonel Rosecrans skillfully and fearlessly placed units of his command into combat in support of the forward elements of that Battalion and thereby contributed materially to the annihilation of the entire hostile garrison. His daring and brilliant handling of this operation in support of the assault of the First Marine Raider Battalion on Tulagi and his courageous conduct throughout the action were in keeping with the highest traditions of the United States Naval Service.
