= Shigetoshi Miyazaki =

Japanese air force commander (1897–1942)

- 宮崎 重敏
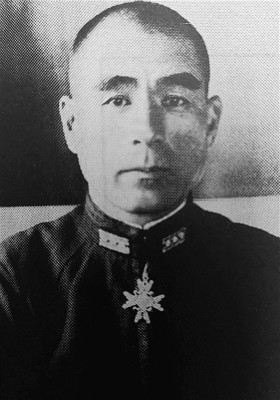
- Born: April 29, 1897; Kōchi Prefecture, Japan
- Died: August 7, 1942 (aged 45); Henderson Field, Guadalcanal, Solomon Islands
- Military career
- Allegiance: Empire of Japan
- Branch: Imperial Japanese Navy; Imperial Japanese Navy Air Service
- Service years: 1918–1942
- Rank: Rear Admiral (posthumous)
- Commands: Toko Naval Air Group, Sasebo Naval Air Group, Yokohama Naval Air Group
- Conflicts: World War II; Pacific War; Guadalcanal campaign; Battle of Tulagi and Gavutu-Tanambogo †
- Awards: Order of the Sacred Treasure

Shigetoshi Miyazaki (宮崎 重敏, Miyazaki Shigetoshi; 29 April 1897 – 7 August 1942) was a captain in the Imperial Japanese Navy Air Service. He was killed during the Battle of Guadalcanal.

== Pacific War ==
From 9 December 1941, he commanded the Japanese occupation of the Gilbert Islands, on Makin.

Miyazaki was the commander of the Yokohama Air Group during the Battle of Guadalcanal. His air group was stationed on Tulagi, an area near to the island. Then the United States invaded, he was in charge of the air defenses. He was close friends with the commander of the Guadalcanal defenses, General Harukichi Hyakutake, and Hyakutake approved his plans to build Henderson Field in the Lunga area in order to support the Japanese New Guinea campaign. On May 18, 1942, he first inspected the Lunga Plain on Guadalcanal - or "Guadarukanaru" as the Japanese called the island, and pronounced it a fit place to establish an airfield on which to base the Mitsubishi G4M1 bomber, later code-named "Betty" by the Allies.

On May 27, 1942, Miyazaki and his engineers created a wildfire to clear the grasses of the Lunga Area in order to construct the airfield. On August 7, the Americans invaded Guadalcanal and Miyazaki had to cope with the marines, so he signaled Captain Sadayoshi Yamada in New Britain, telling him that the troops would fight to the last man and that they destroyed their papers. Fighting as an infantryman, Miyazaki was gunned down by US Marines.
