= 3rd Combat Engineer Battalion =

3rd Combat Engineer Battalion aka. 3rd Pioneer Battalion
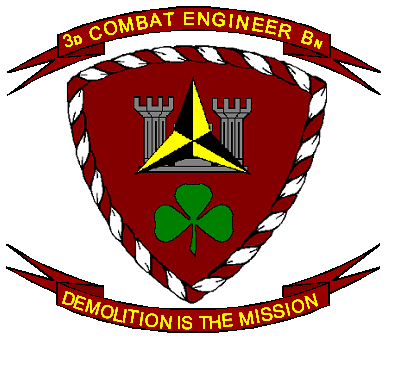
- 3d CEB insignia
- Active: September 1942 – 6 June 1995; 1 October 2007 – 5 August 2014
- Country: United States of America
- Branch: United States Marine Corps
- Type: Combat Engineering
- Garrison/HQ: MCAGCC Twentynine Palms
- Motto: "Demolition is the Mission"
- Anniversaries: 16 September
- Engagements: World War II: Battle of Bougainville; Battle of Guam; Battle of Iwo Jima; Vietnam War; Operation Desert Storm; Operation Enduring Freedom

3rd Combat Engineer Battalion (3rd CEB) was a combat engineer battalion of the United States Marine Corps, most recently activated from 7 October 2007 to 5 August 2014.

== Mission ==
Provide mobility, counter mobility, survivability, and limited general engineering support.

== Current sub-units ==
- Headquarters and Service Company
- Alpha Company
- Bravo Company
- Support Company

== History ==
=== World War II ===
The battalion was first formed on 16 September 1942 as 1st Battalion, 19th Marine Regiment. Two years later on 16 August 1944 they were re-designated the 3d Engineer Battalion. The battalion was deactivated at Marine Corps Base Camp Pendleton, California on 30 November 1945. From August 1957 until January 1962, the battalion was designated 3d Pioneer Battalion.

=== Vietnam War ===
The 3d Combat Engineer Battalion deployed to the Republic of Vietnam landed at Chu Lai in July 1965 and later moved to Da Nang remaining in country until October 1969. During this time the battalion operated from Da Nang, Đông Hà, Gia Le, Quang Tri, Cửa Việt, Camp Carroll, Cam Lộ, and the Vandegrift Combat Base. After Vietnam the battalion was moved to Camp Schwab, Okinawa, only to be relocated in November 1970 to Camp Hansen, Okinawa. On 15 May 1976 the battalion was redesignated as the 3d Combat Engineer Battalion.

=== 1970s through the 1990s ===
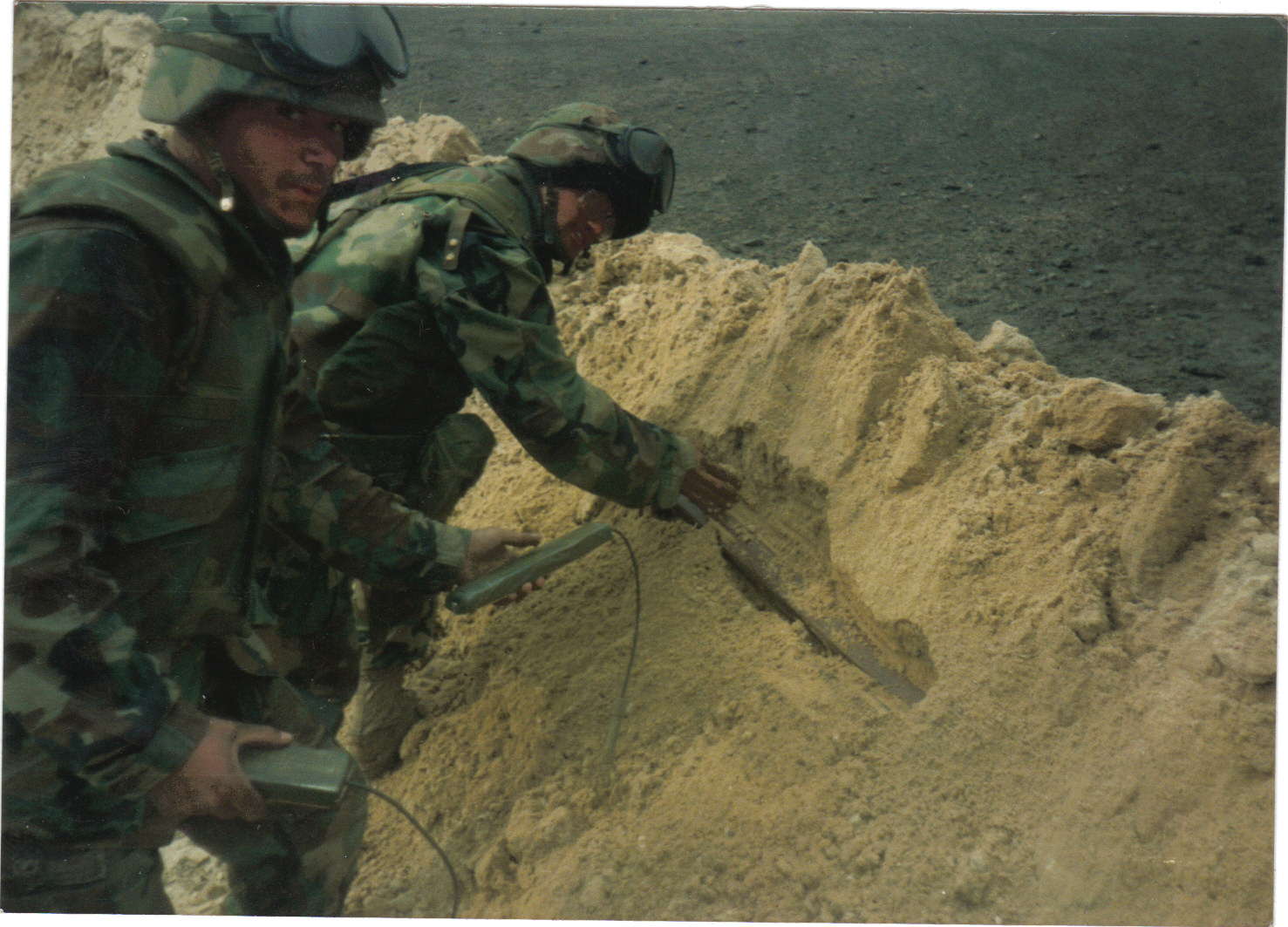
Marines from 3rd CEB dispose of mines in a berm during the Gulf War ground campaign

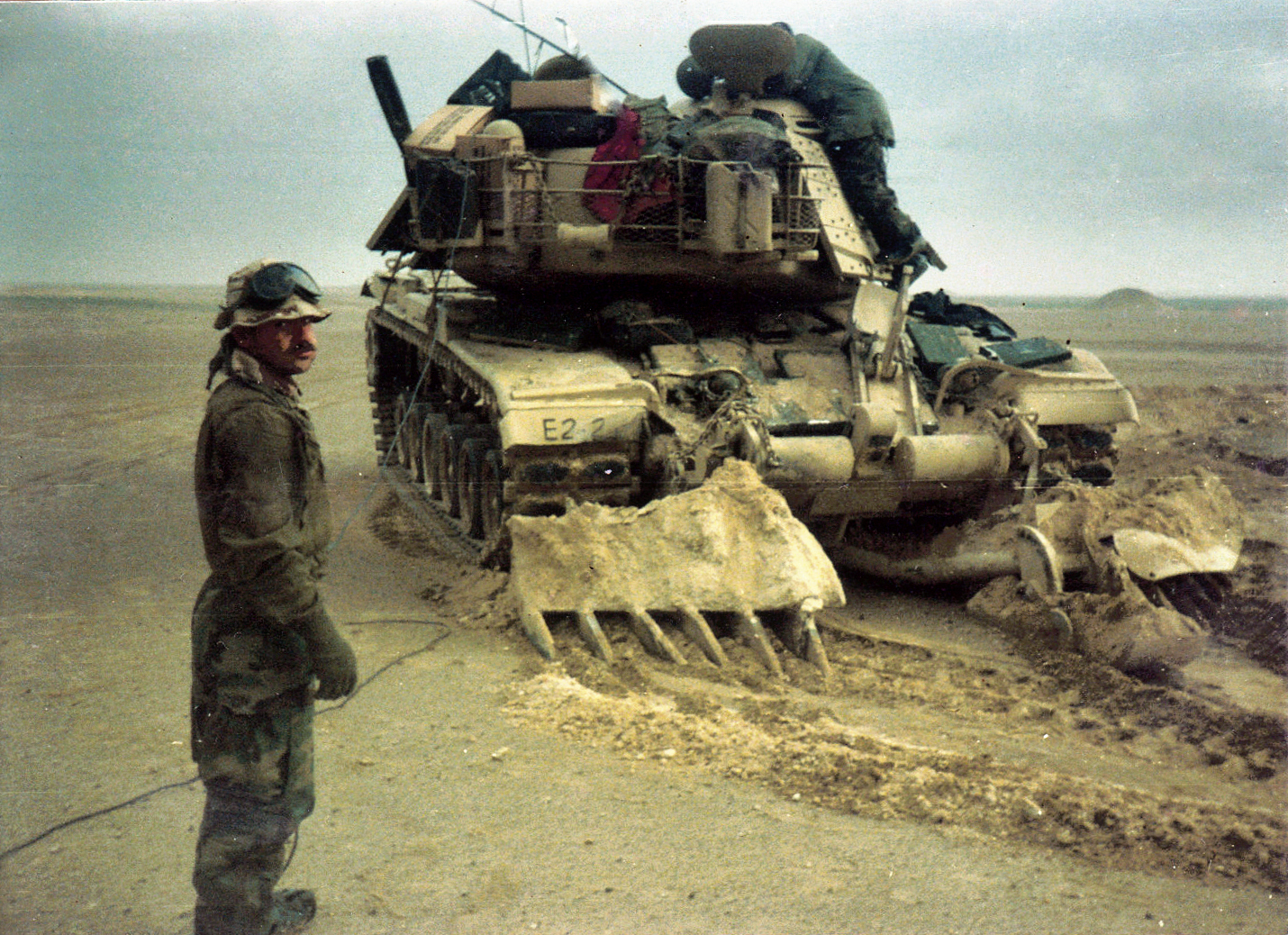
Tank plow used by the battalion for clearing minefields in Kuwait

In September 1975, the Battalion was redesignated as 3d Combat Engineer Battalion.

3d CEB provided three companies to Operations Desert Shield/Desert Storm between August 1990 and March 1991. "Alpha" Company deployed from Marine Corps Base Hawaii with the 1st Marine Expeditionary Brigade, "Bravo" Company deployed via amphibious shipping 15 August 1990 from Okinawa, and "Charlie" Company landed in Saudi Arabia five days before the air war began. The Marines from 3d CEB participated in breaching operations with "Task Force Grizzly" and "Task Force Papa Bear." Once in country, Alpha Co, 3rd CEB was soon assigned to 1st CEB and was referred to as "Alpha 3rd", to distinguish them from Alpha Company, 1st CEB. One platoon from Bravo Company, 3rd CEB, 3rd Mar Div, Okinawa, arrived in country via amphibious shipping and was added to "Alpha 3rd'" to become the company's 3rd platoon. 1st CEB supported Taskforce Ripper, [the lead element of 1st Mar Div during Desert Storm]. "Alpha 3rd'", was designated an Obstacle Clearing Detachment and was assigned to operate along with 1st Battalion 5th Marines, Company A, 3rd Assault Amphibian Battalion and Company A 1st Tank Battalion as the lead element of Task Force Ripper to breach minefields. Alpha Company 3rd' performed one minefield breach on the 1st mine field belt, and one breach on the second minefield breach which was defended by the Iraqi forces. "Alpha Company '3rd" also supplied a squad of engineers to conduct breaching operations for Task Force Shepard.

In 1995, 3d CEB was deactivated. Their numbers were dispersed to other combat engineers units throughout the Marine Corps. The battalion was renamed Combat Engineer Company and was folded into Combat Assault Battalion of the 3rd Marine Division.

=== Reactivation and the Global War on Terror ===
Alpha Company was stood up in Twentynine Palms, California the autumn of 2007. The company, minus its 2nd Platoon, deployed to Iraq in support of Operation Iraqi Freedom and fell under the command of Regimental Combat Team 5 during 2008. The 2nd Platoon deployed at about the same time to Afghanistan in support of Operation Enduring Freedom with the 2nd Battalion, 7th Marines operating throughout Helmand and Farah Provinces.

Bravo Company was stood up in November 2008 with three full strength line platoons. The battalion will also have a full company to facilitate the use of the new Assault Breacher Vehicle (ABV). In April 2010 Alpha Company, along with a company-sized element from First Tank Battalion (trained as engineers), deployed as a theatre asset to Helmand Province forces as Route Clearance, in support of 3rd Battalion 7th Marines. Alpha Company was then dispatched across Helmand Province including the districts of Marjeh, Musa Qala, and the infamous battle of Sangin. In August 2011 Bravo Company deployed to Helmand Province, again, in support of 3rd Battalion 7th Marines and 2nd Battalion 4th Marines. Alpha Company deployed again in 2013 with 1st Platoon direct supporting(DS) to 2nd Battalion 8th Marines and 2nd Platoon direct supporting 3rd Battalion 4th Marines Bravo Company deployed to Afghanistan again in 2013 as a route clearance company of 3rd Combat Engineer Battalion.

3d Combat Engineer Battalion deployed to Helmand Province, Afghanistan in support of Operation Enduring Freedom during 2010, 2011, and 2013.

== Unit awards ==
A unit citation or commendation is an award bestowed upon an organization for the action cited. Members of the unit who participated in said actions are allowed to wear on their uniforms the appropriate ribbon of the awarded unit citation. 3rd Combat Engineer Battalion has been awarded the following:

Streamer	Award	Year(s)	Additional Info
	Presidential Unit Citation Streamer with one Bronze Star	22–28 February 1945, 15 July 1965 – 15 September 1967	Iwo Jima, Vietnam
	Navy Unit Commendation Streamer	15 May – 9 July 1991	Operation Sea Angel I
	Meritorious Unit Commendation Streamer	1–25 May 1968	Vietnam
	Asiatic-Pacific Campaign Streamer with four Bronze Stars	1 November – 15 December 1943, 4 January – 4 June 1944, 21 July – 15 August 1944, 22 February – 16 March 1945	Treasury – Bougainville, Consolidation of Solomon Islands, Marianas, Iwo Jima
	World War II Victory Streamer	1942–1945	Pacific War
	National Defense Service Streamer with three Bronze Stars	1950–1954, 1961–1974, 1990–1995, 2009 – present	Korean War, Vietnam War, Gulf War, war on terrorism
	Korean Service Streamer	23 August 1953 – 27 July 1954	Korea
	Vietnam Service Streamer with two Silver Stars	June 1965 – October 1969	Vietnam
	Afghanistan Campaign Streamer with one Bronze Star	2010	Helmand Province (Consolidation III)
	Global War on Terrorism Service Streamer	2009 – present	
	Vietnam Gallantry Cross with Palm Streamer	15 July 1965 – 20 September 1969	

== Notable former members ==
- Lawrence D. Rogers – recipient of the Navy Cross

== See also ==
- 19th Marines
- List of United States Marine Corps battalions
- Organization of the United States Marine Corps
