= 20th Marine Regiment (United States) =

- Active: June 15, 1943 — August 31, 1944
- Country: United States of America
- Branch: United States Marine Corps
- Type: Engineer regiment
- Engagements: World War II: Battle of Kwajalein; Battle of Saipan; Battle of Tinian

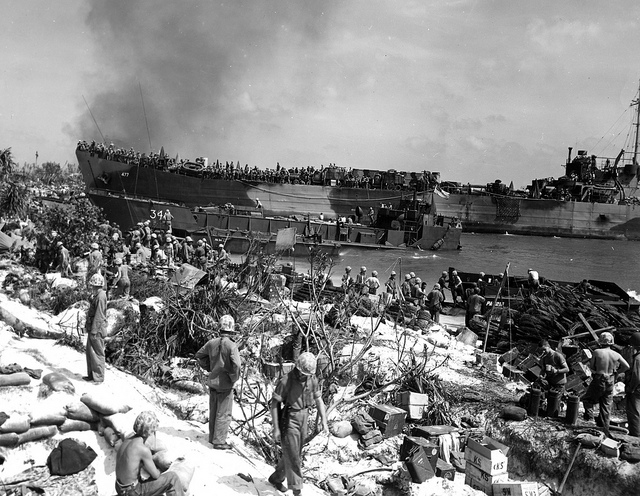
121st NCB landing on Roi-Namur as 3rd Battalion 20th Marines. (Seabee Museum Archives)

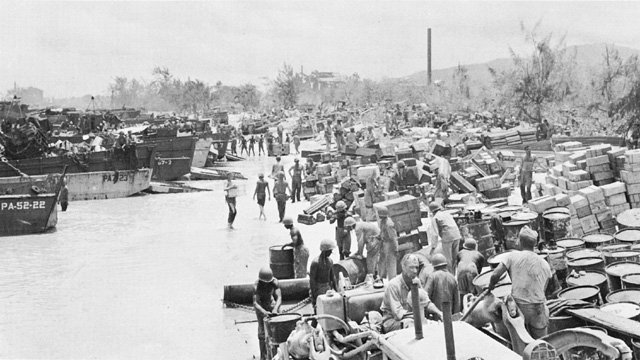
Shore Party Blue beach 1, Saipan. The second and third battalions of the 20th Marines were the 4th Marine Divisions shore party on blue and yellow beaches. (National Archives)

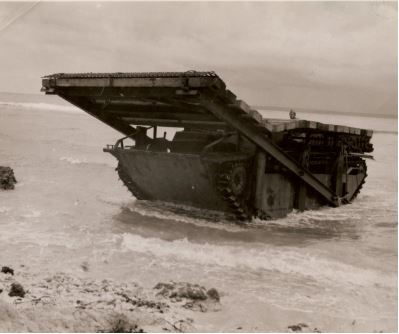
LVT-2 assault landing ramp conceived and constructed by the Seabees to facilitate the landing and outflanking of the defenses on Tinian.(Seabee Museum Archives)

20th Marine Regiment was a Composite Engineer Regiment of the United States Marine Corps that fought during World War II.

== Subordinate units ==
The regiment was a composite of three different types of battalions and a headquarters and service company:

- Headquarters & Services Company
- 1st Battalion, A, B,& C Companies 4th Engineer Battalion
- 2nd Battalion, D, E, & F Companies 4th Pioneer Battalion
- 3rd Battalion, G, H, & I Companies 121st Naval Construction Battalion

== History ==
20th Marines was formed on June 15, 1943, at Marine Corps Base Camp Lejeune, North Carolina, it originally consisted of three battalions and was assigned to support the 4th Marine Division. The 1st and 2nd Battalions were made up of the 4th Marine Engineers and Pioneers while the 3rd Battalion was formed with US Navy Construction Battalion personnel also known as Seabees. During the war the Regiment involved in the battle of Roi Namur, Battle of Saipan and Battle of Tinian. On Saipan, the 4th Marine Division assigned 2/20 and 3/20 (4th Pioneers and 121st CB) as the shore party The regiment was inactivated on August 31, 1944 with the 4th Engineer and 4th Pioneer Battalions reassigned to the Division itself. While the 121st NCB remained at Tinian to work on the airfield, the 4th moved on preparing for Iwo Jima. 133 NCB was posted to the slot vacated by the 121st. With the 20th Regiment gone the 133rd was assigned to the 23rd Marines as their shore party and the 4th Pioneers were assigned to the 25th Marines as theirs. The 4th Engineers were then under divisional control. A note concerning the 121st. That Battalion had Marine Officers assigned to it.

When the 19th CB was assigned to the Marine Corps 11/05/42 it lost one company and 1/4 of Hq Co. Those men were assigned to the Fleet Marine Force Replacement Group, New River, NC (19th replacement group) which would form the core of the 121st CB when it was formed 05/03/43. On 7 July 43 the Battalion was redesignated as the Third Battalion Twentieth Marines. The Battalion was shore party for the 23rd Combat team on beaches blue 1 and 2 on Saipan.

On Tinian there were two small beaches on the North end where an assault landing could be made. The rest of the island had coral cliffs up to 15 feet in height at the waters edge negating any assault plans. However, the Marine Corps asked the Seabees if they could come up with an idea to facilitate a landing in one of these other areas. Commodore Paul J. Halloran (CEC) CB theater commander provided drawings of a conceptual landing ramp for the 18th and 121st CBs to fabricate. They mounted steel beams salvaged from Saipans abandoned sugar mill on LVT-2s to create a portable assault ramps. If they worked they would allow the Marines to outflank Tinian's prepared defenses. The Marine General was skeptical and ordered that the ramps be put through a 100 vehicle use tests. The Seabee creation was named a Doodlebug. It worked exactly as the Marines had hoped.

Regiment's Commanders

- Lieutenant Colonel Nelson K. Brown (15 June 1943 - 22 August 1943)
- Colonel Lucian W. Burnham (23 August 1943 - 9 April 1944)
- Lieutenant Colonel Nelson K. Brown (10 April 1944 - 31 August 1944)

== Unit awards ==
Presidential Unit Citation with blue enamel star

== See also ==
- List of United States Marine Corps regiments
- Organization of the United States Marine Corps
- 4th Marine Division
- 16th Marine Regiment(Engineer)
- 17th Marine Regiment(Engineer)
- 18th Marine Regiment(Engineer)
- 19th Marine Regiment(Engineer)
- 23rd Marine Regiment
- Seabees
