= Nggela Islands =

Island group in Solomon Islands

Native name: Nggela Sule and Nggela Pile
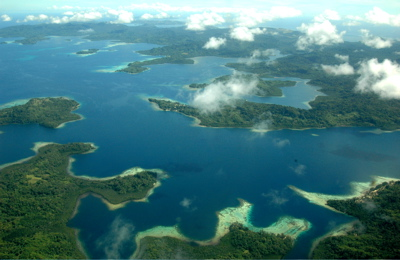
- The Nggela Islands from the air

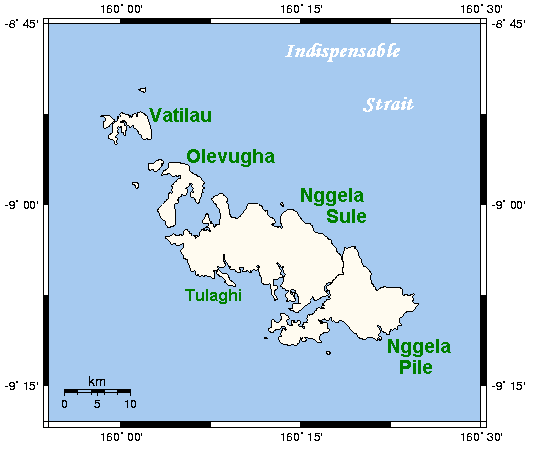
- Map of the Nggela islands group

- Location within Solomon Islands

Geography
- Location: South Pacific Ocean
- Coordinates: 9°00′S 160°10′E
- Archipelago: Solomon Islands (archipelago)
- Total islands: 4
- Major islands: 2

Administration
- Solomon Islands
- Province: Central Province

The Nggela Islands or Ngella Islands, previously known as the Florida Islands, are a small island group in the Central Province of Solomon Islands, a sovereign state, in the southwest Pacific Ocean. The name Florida Islands fell into disuse following Solomon Islands' independence in 1978.

The group is composed of four larger islands and about 50 smaller ones, many with white coral beaches. The four main islands are, Nggela Sule with Nggela Pile to its southeast, separated by the narrow Mboli Passage, Olevugha (also known as Mobokonimbeti, and previously Sandfly Is.) and Vatilau (also known as Buenavista) to the northwest. Smaller islands include: Anuha, (70 ha (170 acres)), south of Nggela Sule, Tulagi just off the southwest coast of Nggela Sule, now the capital of Central Province and previously the British administrative centre for the Solomons, Gavutu and Tanambogo.

== History ==
The first recorded sighting by Europeans was by the Spanish expedition of Álvaro de Mendaña on 16 April 1568. More precisely the sighting was due to a local voyage done by a small boat, in the accounts the brigantine Santiago, commanded by Maestre de campo Pedro Ortega Valencia and having Hernán Gallego as pilot. They were who charted it as "Pascua Florida" (from the festival of that name) from where its present-day name "Florida" derives. Tulagi in Nggela Sule was the seat of the administration of the British Solomon Islands prior to the 1942 Japanese invasion in World War II.

The Nggela Islands group lies immediately north of the more famous island of Guadalcanal, the scene of the Guadalcanal Campaign during World War II; however, Nggela Sule itself was garrisoned by the Japanese in April 1942 in connection with their efforts to establish a seaplane base on neighbouring Gavutu. On 7 August of the same year, the United States 1st Battalion, 2nd Marine Regiment landed on the island to provide cover for the assault on the neighbouring Tulagi islet. Florida Island served as a small, secondary base of operations for the US and Australian and New Zealand war effort in the Pacific for the duration of the war. Following the Allied liberation of the island from the Japanese, it became the site of a US seaplane base. About 80 Japanese troops from Tulagi escaped to Florida Island and fought Marine and British Solomon Islands Protectorate Defence Force patrols for the next two months until being wiped out. The island subsequently served as a watering point for the US Navy, diverting water from an underground source on the island.

After World War II, the British administration moved to Honiara, Guadalcanal.

== Fauna ==
The Florida naked-tailed rat – possibly extinct – was endemic to the Nggela Islands. The black rat was introduced.

Other animals include:

- dark sheath-tailed bat
- diadem leaf-nosed bat
- dwarf flying fox
- Geoffroy's rousette
- great bent-winged bat
- island tube-nosed fruit bat
- long-tongued nectar bat
- Solomon's naked-backed fruit bat
- Woodford's fruit bat
