= 16th Marine Regiment (United States) =

- Active: December 1943 – May 1944
- Country: United States of America
- Branch: United States Marine Corps
- Type: Engineer Regiment
- Part of: 5th Marine Division
- Engagements: World War II

The 16th Marine Regiment was a composite engineer regiment of the United States Marine Corps subordinate to the 5th Marine Division. While its subordinate battalions went to the Battle of Iwo Jima as part of the 5th Marine Division, the Regimental headquarters was disbanded while still in the United States.

== Subordinate units ==
The regiment comprised two battalions and a headquarters and service company:

- 1st Battalion, 16th Marines, 5th Engineer Battalion now the 5th Combat Engineer Battalion
- 2nd Battalion, 16th Marines, 5th Pioneer Battalion
- 3rd Battalion 16th Marines (no Naval Construction Battalion was ever assigned)

== History ==
=== World War II ===
The 16th Marines were inactivated on 25 May 1944 with the 5th Engineers and 5th Pioneers activated that same day. For the assault of Iwo Jima the 5th Marine Division created the 5th Shore Party Regiment with the Commanding Officer from the 16th Marines, Col Benjamin W. Gally as commander. It was composed of the 5th Pioneer Battalion and 31st Naval Construction Battalion. The 5th Engineer Battalion was under Divisional control.

== See also ==
- History of the United States Marine Corps
- List of United States Marine Corps regiments
- Organization of the United States Marine Corps
- 5th Marine Division
- 17th Marine Regiment(Engineer)
- 18th Marine Regiment(Engineer)
- 19th Marine Regiment(Engineer)
- 20th Marine Regiment(Engineer)
- Seabees
