= 18th Marine Regiment (United States) =

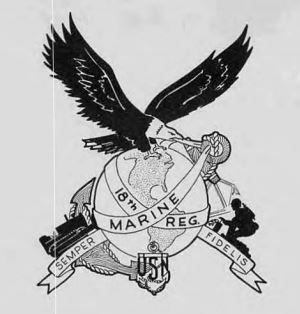
- 18th Marine Regiment insignia
- Active: 18 September 1942 – 16 August 1944
- Country: United States of America
- Branch: United States Marine Corps
- Type: Engineer Regiment
- Part of: 2nd Marine Division
- Engagements: World War II: Battle of Tarawa; Battle of Saipan; Battle of Tinian

The 18th Marine Regiment was a composite engineer regiment of the United States Marine Corps subordinate to the 2nd Marine Division. It was disbanded during the war, with the 1st and 2nd battalions remaining in the Division.

== Subordinate units ==
The regiment was a composite of three different types of battalions and a headquarters and service company:

- 1st Battalion, A, B, & C Companies 2nd Engineer Battalion, now 2nd Combat Engineer Battalion
- 2nd Battalion, D, E, & F Companies 2nd Pioneer Battalion, now 2nd Landing Support Battalion
- 3rd Battalion, G, H, & I Companies 18th Naval Construction Battalion, now Naval Mobile Construction Battalion 18 or NMCB 18

== History ==
=== World War II ===
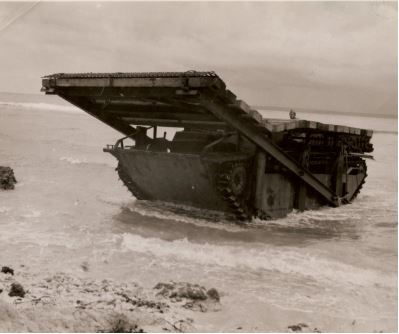
LVT-2 assault landing ramp conceived and constructed by the Seabees to facilitate the landing and outflanking of the defenses on Tinian.(Seabee Museum)

18th Marines was activated on 8 September 1942 and participated in actions at Tarawa, Saipan and Tinian. It was inactivated on 16 August 1944.

On Tinian there were two small beaches on the North end where an assault landing could be made with low coral ledges. The rest of the island had coral cliffs up to 15 feet in height at the waters edge negating any assault plans. However, the Marine Corps asked the Seabees if they could come up with an idea to get over the coral. Commodore Paul J. Halloran (CEC) CB theater commander provided drawings of a conceptual landing ramp for the 18th and 121st CBs to fabricate. They mounted steel beams salvaged from Saipan's abandoned sugar mill on LVT-2s to create a portable assault ramps. If they worked they would allow the Marines to outflank Tinian's prepared defenses. The Marine Generals was skeptical and ordered that the ramps be put through a 100 vehicle use tests. The Seabee creation was named a Doodlebug. It worked exactly as the Marines had hoped.

=== Commanders ===
- Colonel Elmer E. Hall: 8 September 1942
- Colonel Ewart S. Laue: 31 August - 3 October 1943; 24–29 February 1944; 7–9 April 1944; 22–24 April 1944
- Colonel Cyril W. Martyr: 4 October 1943 - 23 February 1944; 1 March - 6 April 1944; 25 June - 15 August 1944
- LtCol Russell Lloyd: 10–14, 19–21, 25–30 April 1944; 1–11 May 1944; 1–24 June 1944

== Unit awards ==
Presidential Unit Citation with blue enamel star : – Tarawa

- 1st Battalion
  - Company A PUC 20-24Nov43 SU 2d MarDiv (REIN)
  - Company B PUC 7Aug-9Dec42 SU 1st MarDiv
  - PUC 20-24Nov43 SU 2d MarDiv (REIN)
  - Company C PUC 20-24Nov43 SU 2d MarDiv (REIN)
- 2d Battalion
  - Company D PUC 7Aug-9Dec42 SU 1st MarDiv
  - PUC 20-24Nov43 SU 2d MarDiv (REIN)
  - Company E PUC 20-24Nov43 SU 2d MarDiv (REIN)
  - Company F PUC 20-24Nov43 SU 2d MarDiv (REIN)

== See also ==
- History of the United States Marine Corps
- List of United States Marine Corps regiments
- Organization of the United States Marine Corps
- 2nd Marine Division
- 16th Marine Regiment(Engineer)
- 17th Marine Regiment(Engineer)
- 19th Marine Regiment(Engineer)
- 20th Marine Regiment(Engineer)
- Seabees
