= 17th Marine Regiment (United States) =

- Active: 12 January 1943 – 30 June 1944
- Country: United States of America
- Branch: United States Marine Corps
- Type: Engineer Regiment
- Part of: 1st Marine Division
- Engagements: World War II: Battle of Cape Gloucester

Commanders
- Notable commanders: Colonel Harold E. Rosecrans; Colonel Francis I. Fenton

The 17th Marine Regiment was a composite engineer regiment of the United States Marine Corps subordinate to the 1st Marine Division. It was formed primarily from units of the Division, and was inactivated during war with the 1st and 2nd battalions remaining in the Division.

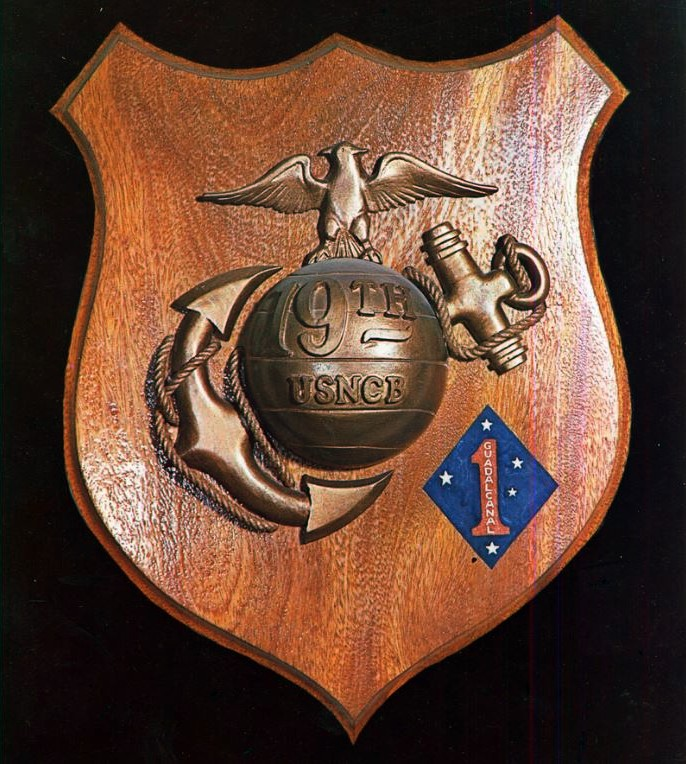
19th Naval Construction Battalion Plaque. The battalion was assigned first to the 1st Marine Amphibious Corps and then was redesignated 3rd Battalion 17th Marines / 1st Marine Division. . . Seabee Museum

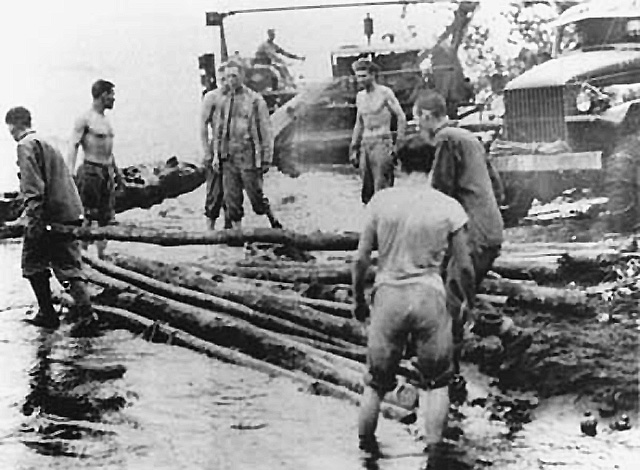
Seabees from C. Co 19th Naval Construction Battalion build a corduroy road from yellow beaches inland with their fellow Marines of the 17th Marines at Cape Gloucester.(USMC- photo 12203)

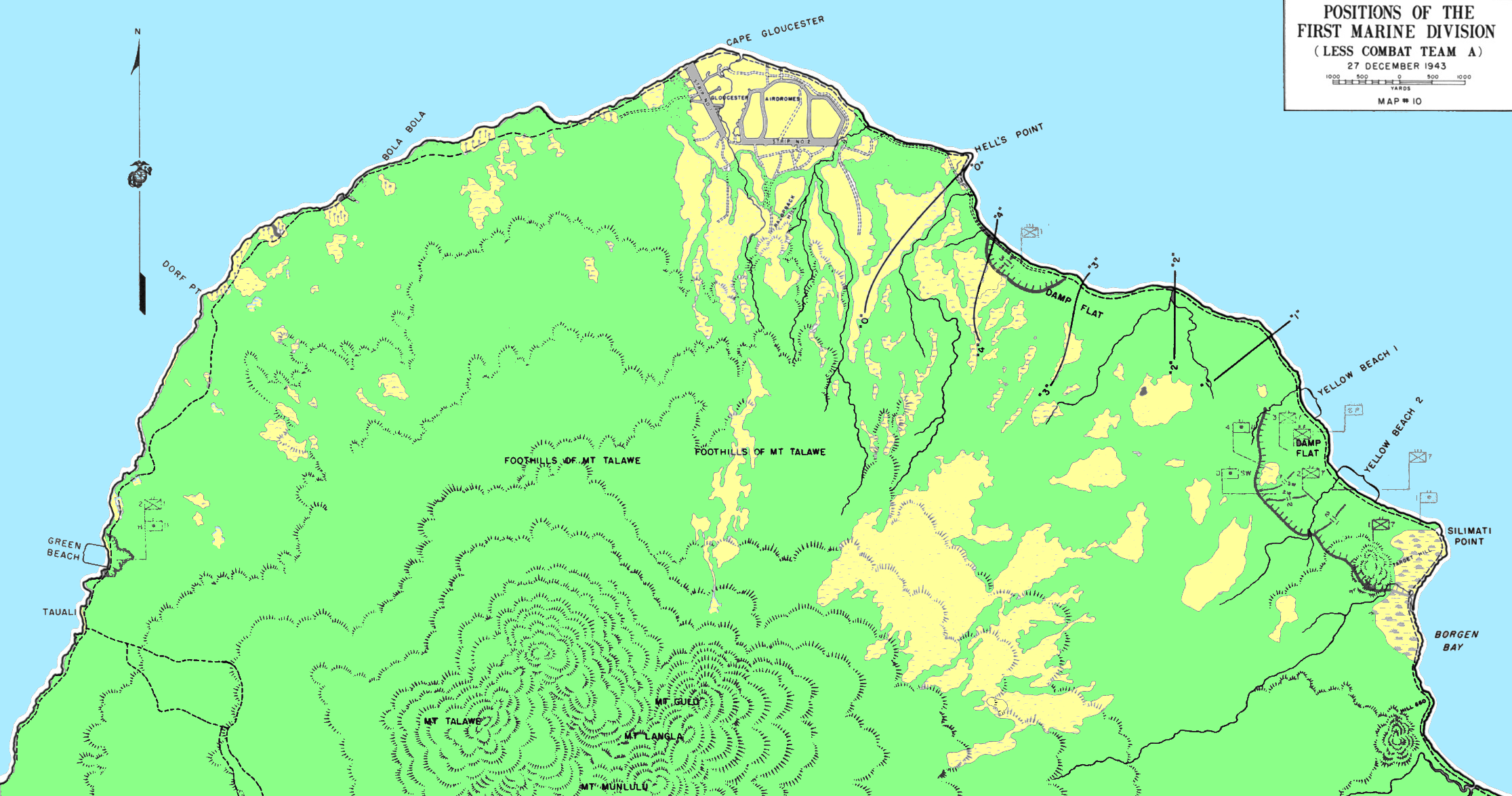
Position of the First Marine Division

== Subordinate units ==
The regiment a composite of three different types of battalions and a headquarters and service company:

- 1st Battalion, 17th Marines, A, B, & C Company 1st Engineer Battalion, now 1st Combat Engineer Battalion
- 2nd Battalion, 17th Marines, D, E, & F Companies 1st Pioneer Battalion, now 1st Landing Support Battalion
- 3rd Battalion, 17th Marines, G, H, & I Companies 19th Naval Construction Battalion

== History ==
=== World War II ===
The 17th Marine Regiment participated in the Battle of Cape Gloucester. The subordinate battalions, as independent battalions in 1st Marine Division, participated in all of the Division's major operations during the war. According to the 19th CB's log it was assigned to the 1st Marine 11/05/42 prior to leaving the States. On 04/03/43 "By Division General Order No. 74 of 3 Apr'43 - First Marine Division: the 19th CBs designation will be as follow's in the future, when attached to First Marine Div., Fleet Marine Force ----3rd Battalion, 17th Marines (Engineers) c/o FPO San Francisco. Calif." The 19th was "at Cape Gloucester from 27 Dec 43 until 4 May 44" and remained with the 1st Division until "1 Jul'44 when The 19th CB was detached from the operational control of the 1st MarDiv, re-designated the 19th NCB and transferred to the 3rd Marine Amphibious Corps.

The 19th had a MM1 Chester J. Perkins who was flight qualified. The Seabees got ahold of a light observation aircraft that MM1 Perkins logged 218 hrs in, of which 105 were combat. He flew spotter for the 11th Marine Regiment as well as dropped urgent medical supplies and rations to forward troops. In recognition of his contributions to the assault he was awarded the Navy Air Medal.

note: when the 19th CB was assigned to the Marine Corps 11/05/42 it lost one company and 1/4 of Hq Co. Those men were assigned to the Fleet Marine Force replacement group (as the 19th replacement group). That group would form the core of the 121st CB which would become the 3rd Battalion, 20th Marines (Engineers).

== Unit awards ==
- Headquarters Company PUC 7Aug-9Dec42 SU 1st MarDiv
- Company D PUC 7Aug-9Dec42 SU 1st MarDiv
- Company E PUC 7Aug-9Dec42 SU 1st MarDiv
- Company F PUC 7Aug-9Dec42 SU 1st MarDiv

== See also ==
- History of the United States Marine Corps
- List of United States Marine Corps regiments
- Organization of the United States Marine Corps
- 1st Marine Division
- 16th Marine Regiment(Engineer)
- 18th Marine Regiment(Engineer)
- 19th Marine Regiment(Engineer)
- 20th Marine Regiment(Engineer)
- Seabees
