= Tanambogo =

Tanambogo Island
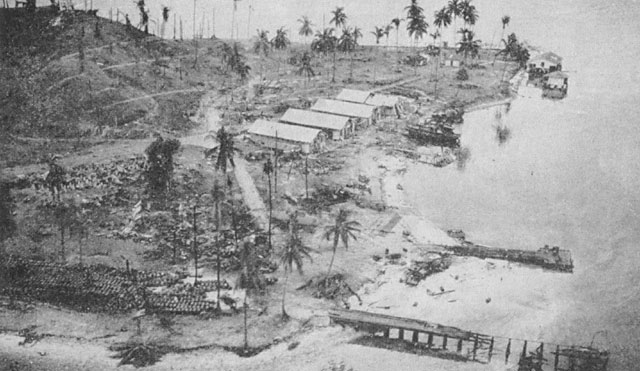
- After bombardment, August 7, 1942

- Location in Solomon Islands
- Coordinates: 9°6′40″S 160°11′5″E
- Country: Solomon Islands
- Province: Central Province
- Island group: Nggela Islands group

Tanambogo is a small island in the Central Province of Solomon Islands in the Nggela Islands group, which was also known as the Florida Islands under the British Solomon Islands Protectorate and during World War II.

== History ==
The first recorded sighting by Europeans was by the Spanish expedition of Álvaro de Mendaña on 16 April 1568. More precisely the sighting was due to a local voyage done by a small boat, in the accounts the brigantine Santiago, commanded by maestre de campo Pedro Ortega Valencia and having Hernán Gallego as pilot.

=== World War II ===
Along with the nearby island of Gavutu, it played an important role in the Guadalcanal campaign during World War II. In 1942 the Japanese attempted to establish a seaplane base on the island. On 7–9 August 1942, in the Battle of Tulagi and Gavutu–Tanambogo, elements of the U.S. 2nd Marine Regiment assaulted and occupied the island.

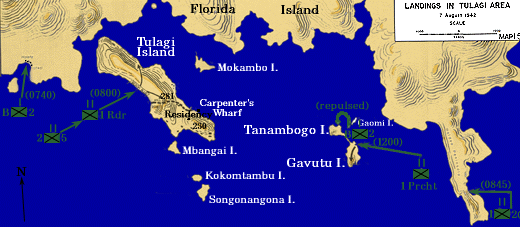
U.S. Marine Landings on Tulagi-Gavutu-Tanambogo, August 7, 1942
