= Gavutu =

Gavutu Island
- Location in Solomon Islands
- Coordinates: 9°6′59″S 160°11′19″E
- Country: Solomon Islands
- Province: Central Province
- Island group: Nggela Islands Group

Gavutu is a small islet in the Central Province of Solomon Islands, some 500 metres (550 yards) in length. It is one of the Nggela Islands.

== History ==
The first recorded sighting by Europeans was by the Spanish expedition of Álvaro de Mendaña on 16 April 1568. More precisely the sighting was due to a local voyage done by a small boat, in the accounts the brigantine Santiago, commanded by maestre de campo Pedro Ortega Valencia and having Hernán Gallego as pilot.

By 1916, Levers Pacific Plantations Ltd had become the largest operator of coconut plantations in the Solomons. It established a trading station and cargo depot on Gavutu.

=== World War II ===
Along with the nearby island of Tanambogo, it played an important role in the Guadalcanal campaign during World War II. In 1942 the Japanese attempted to establish a seaplane base on the island. On 7–9 August 1942, in the Battle of Tulagi and Gavutu–Tanambogo, the 1st Marine Parachute Battalion and elements of the U.S. 2nd Marine Regiment assaulted and occupied the island.

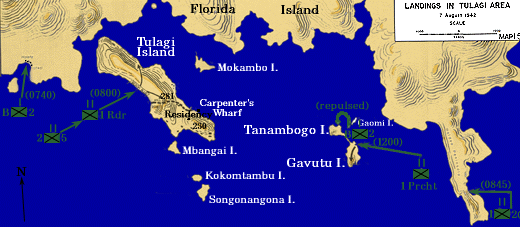
