= McDonnell Douglas DC-10 =

Wide-body three-engine airliner

McDonnell Douglas DC-10 / MD-10
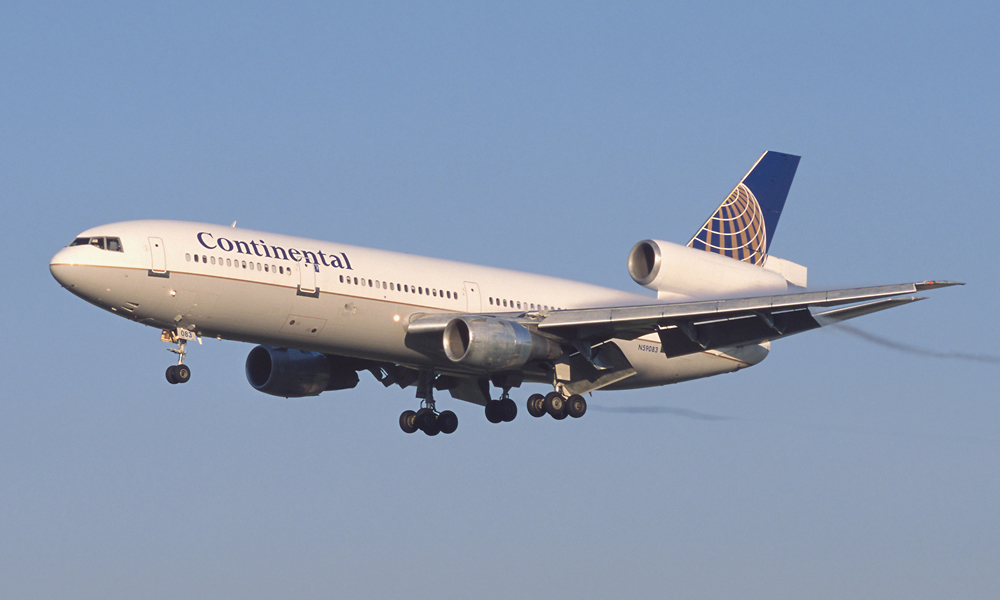
- A DC-10-30 of Continental Airlines

General information
- Type: Wide-body airliner
- National origin: United States
- Manufacturer: McDonnell Douglas
- Status: In limited non-passenger service
- Primary users: FedEx Express (historical): American Airlines (historical); United Airlines (historical); Northwest Airlines (historical)
- Number built: 386

History
- Manufactured: 1969–1989
- Introduction date: August 5, 1971, with American Airlines
- First flight: August 29, 1970; 56 years ago
- Retired: February 24, 2014 (passenger service)
- Variants: McDonnell Douglas KC-10 Extender; DC-10 Air Tanker
- Developed into: McDonnell Douglas MD-11

The McDonnell Douglas DC-10 is an American trijet wide-body aircraft manufactured by McDonnell Douglas. The DC-10 was intended to succeed the DC-8 for long-range flights. It first flew on August 29, 1970; it was introduced on August 5, 1971, by American Airlines.

The trijet has two turbofans on underwing pylons and a third one at the base of the vertical stabilizer. The twin-aisle layout has a typical seating for 270 in two classes. The initial DC-10-10 had a 3,500-nautical-mile [nmi] (6,500 km; 4,000 mi) range for transcontinental flights. The DC-10-15 had more powerful engines for hot and high airports. The DC-10-30 and –40 models (with a third main landing gear leg to support higher weights) each had intercontinental ranges of up to 5,200 nmi (9,600 km; 6,000 mi). The KC-10 Extender (based on the DC-10-30) is a tanker aircraft that was primarily operated by the United States Air Force.

Early operations of the DC-10 were afflicted by its poor safety record, which was partially attributable to a design flaw in the original cargo doors that caused multiple incidents, including fatalities. Most notable was the crash of Turkish Airlines Flight 981 near Paris in 1974, the deadliest crash in aviation history up to that time. Following the crash of American Airlines Flight 191, the deadliest aviation accident in US history, the US Federal Aviation Administration (FAA) temporarily banned all DC-10s from American airspace in June 1979. In August 1983, McDonnell Douglas announced that production would end due to a lack of orders, as it had widespread public apprehension after the 1979 crash and a poor fuel economy reputation. As design flaws were rectified and fleet hours increased, the DC-10 achieved a long-term safety record comparable to those of similar-era passenger jets. However, following the crash of UPS Airlines Flight 2976 in 2025, which occurred with the airplane's successor McDonnell Douglas MD-11, all DC-10s were again grounded globally. The grounding ended in May 2026 when the FAA approved an inspection and maintenance protocol for the engine pylon mounting hardware.

The DC-10 outsold the similar Lockheed L-1011 TriStar due to the latter's delayed introduction and high cost. Production of the DC-10 ended in 1989, with 386 delivered to airlines along with 60 KC-10 tankers. After merging with McDonnell Douglas in 1997, Boeing upgraded many in-service DC-10s as the MD-10 with a glass cockpit that eliminated the need for a flight engineer. In February 2014, the DC-10 made its last commercial passenger flight, operated by Biman Bangladesh Airlines. Today, only a small handful of airlines fly the DC-10, mainly for cargo and aerial firefighting.

== Development ==
=== Background ===
Following an unsuccessful proposal for the United States Air Force's CX-HLS (Heavy Logistics System) in 1965, Douglas Aircraft began design studies based on its CX-HLS submission. The aviation author John H. Fielder notes that the company was under competitive pressure to produce a wide-body aircraft, having been somewhat slow in the previous decade to introduce its first jetliners. In 1966, American Airlines offered a specification to manufacturers for a twin-engine wide-body aircraft smaller than the Boeing 747 yet capable of flying similar long-range routes from airports with shorter runways; this specification would be highly influential in the design of what would become the DC-10. It would become McDonnell Douglas's first commercial airliner after the merger between McDonnell Aircraft Corporation and Douglas Aircraft Company in 1967.

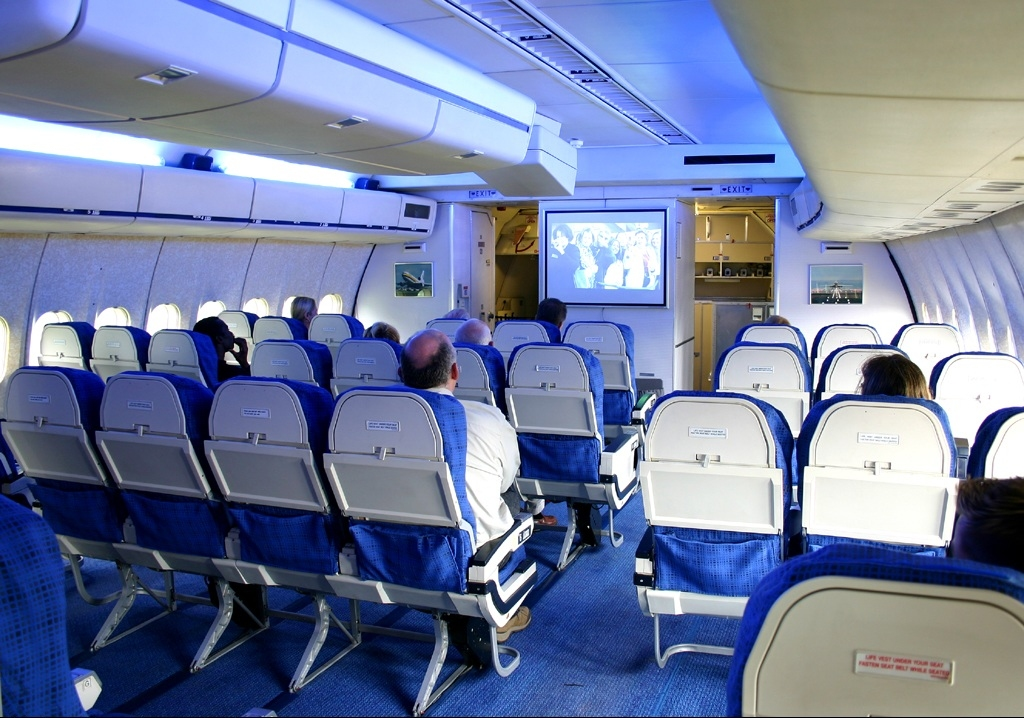
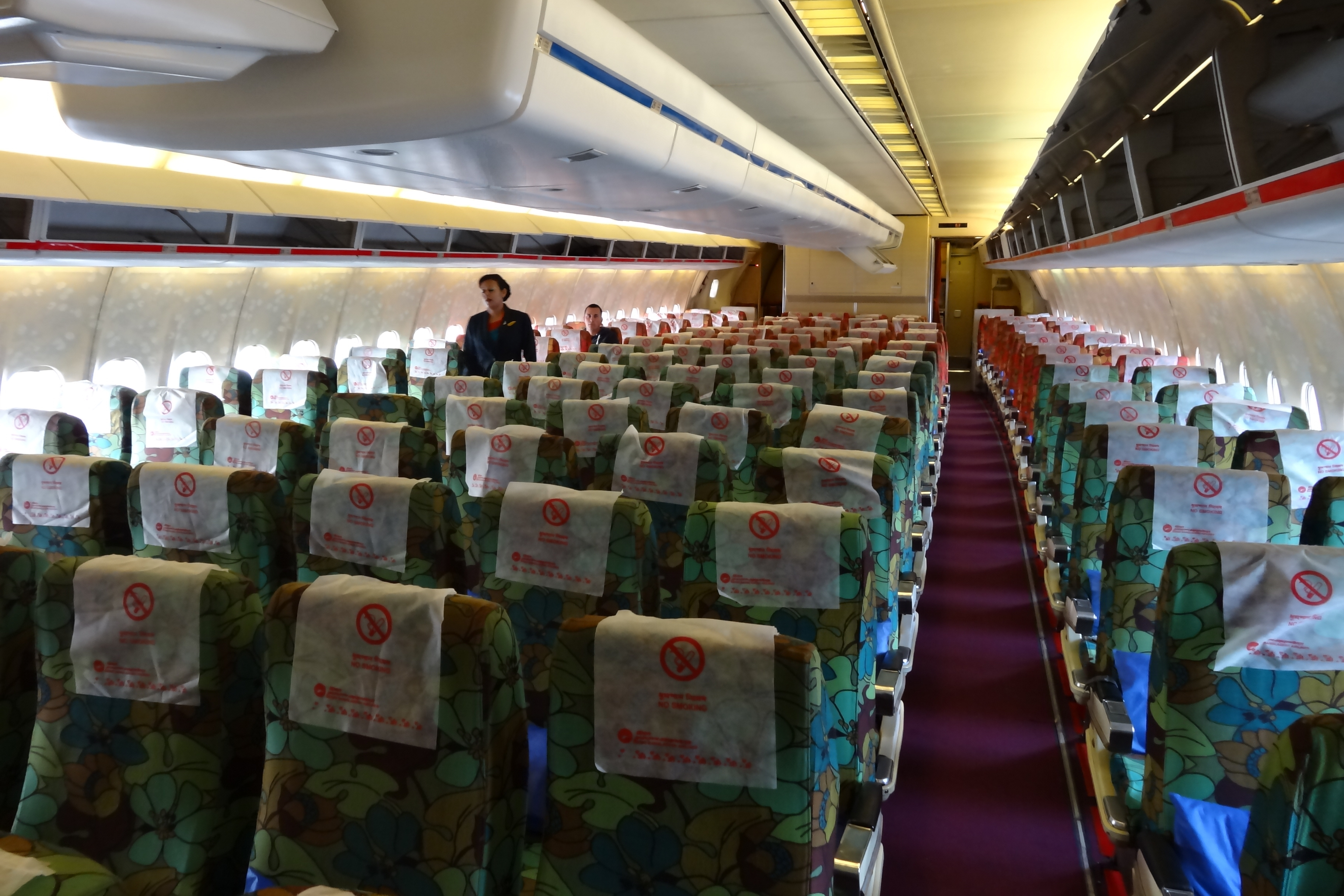
The 3-4-3 (left) and 2-5-2 (right) seating configuration

An early DC-10 design proposal was for a four-engine double-deck wide-body jet airliner with a maximum seating capacity of 550 passengers and similar in length to a DC-8. The proposal was shelved in favor of a trijet single-deck wide-body airliner with a maximum seating capacity of 399 passengers, and similar in length to the DC-8 Super 60. The choice of three engines was influenced by surveys of potential customers other than American Airlines, together with a desire to enhance hot and high climb performance after an engine failure—a serious concern at Stapleton International Airport, which was heavily used by United Airlines, one of the major anticipated buyers. Large portions of the detailed design work, particularly that of the fuselage, were subcontracted to external companies, such as the American aerospace company Convair. The legal relationship between McDonnell Douglas, Convair, and the Federal Aviation Administration (FAA) would later serve to complicate matters; specifically, Convair was forbidden from contacting the regulator no matter the severity of any safety concerns it had in the DC-10's design.

McDonnell Douglas management became seriously concerned about the viability of the DC-10 after learning about the competing Lockheed L-1011, which was very similar and was being offered to the same customers. On February 19, 1968, in what was supposed to be a knockout blow to Lockheed, George A. Spater, President of American Airlines, and James S. McDonnell of McDonnell Douglas announced American Airlines' intention to acquire the DC-10. This was a shock to Lockheed and there was general agreement within the US aviation industry that American Airlines had left its competitors at the starting gate. According to Fielder, McDonnell Douglas had been urgently pursuing the DC-10's completion in light of the prospective competition and the high financial stakes involved. Together with American Airlines' announcement of the DC-10 order, it was also reported that American Airlines had declared its intention to have the British Rolls-Royce RB211 turbofan engine on its DC-10 airliners. The DC-10 was first ordered by launch customers American Airlines with 25 orders, and United Airlines with 30 orders and 30 options in 1968. The DC-10's similarity to the Lockheed L-1011 in design, passenger capacity, and launch date resulted in a sales competition that affected the profitability of both aircraft.

=== Into flight ===
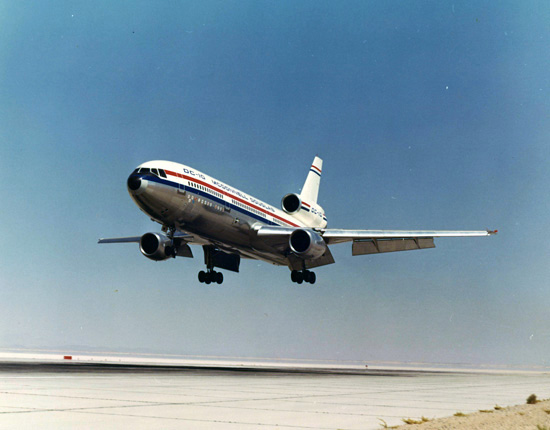
A prototype during flight testing, the DC-10 made its first flight on August 29, 1970.

On August 29, 1970, the first DC-10, a series 10, conducted its maiden flight. An extensive flight test program was carried out, totaling 929 flights and 1,551 flight hours; the test program was not incident-free: during one ground test in 1970, an outwardly-opening cargo door blew out. The rapid de-pressurization of the cargo hold caused the main cabin's floor to collapse. This discovery and first effort at rectification led to a contract dispute between McDonnell Douglas and Convair over what changes were necessary and financial liability. Fielder alleges that McDonnell Douglas consistently sought to minimize and postpone any design changes to the DC-10, although this attitude was not an explicit policy. In July 1971, Convair outlined the situation in a formal memo; almost a year later, it internally expressed concerns that the inadequate resolution would lead to loss of aircraft. Tragically, the initial rectification work would prove to be inadequate.

On July 29, 1971, the FAA issued the type certificate for the DC-10, permitting its entry into revenue service. It entered commercial service with American Airlines on August 5, 1971, with the initial flight being a round-trip flight between Los Angeles and Chicago. United Airlines also commenced DC-10 flights later that same month. American's DC-10s were configured to seat a maximum of 206 passengers while United's seated 222; both had six-across seating in first-class and eight-across (four pairs) in coach. They operated the first version of the DC-10, referred to as the "domestic" series 10, which had a range of 3,800 miles (3,300 nmi; 6,100 km) with a typical passenger load and a range of 2,710 miles (2,350 nmi; 4,360 km) with maximum payload.

=== Further development ===
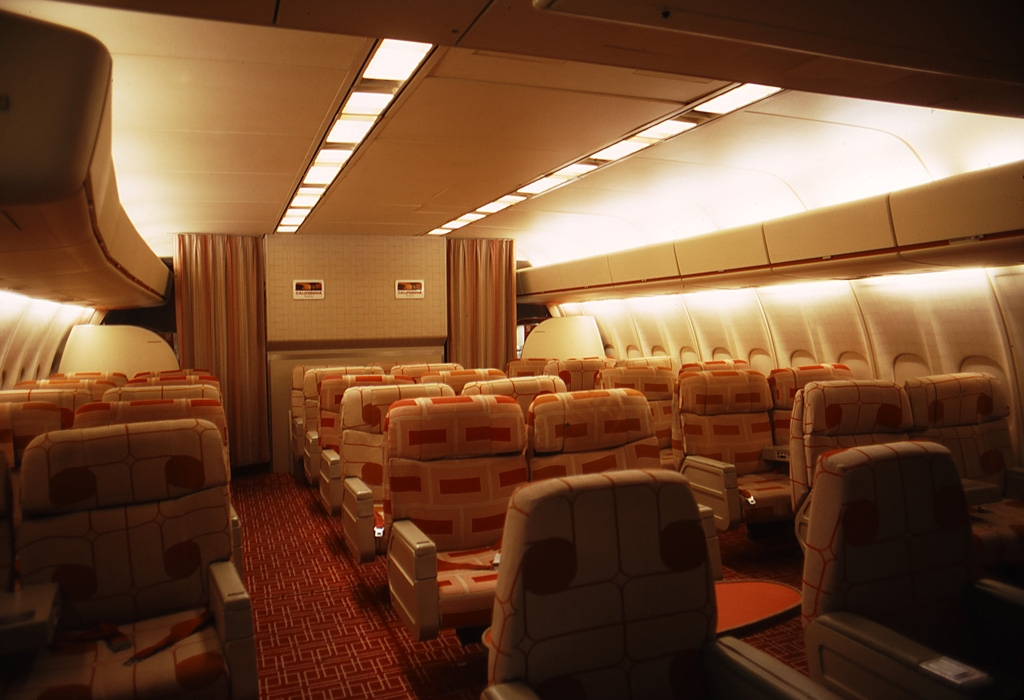
Continental Airlines six-abreast interior in 1973

Various models of the DC-10 promptly followed, such as the series 15, which had a typical load range of 4,350 miles (3,780 nmi; 7,000 km). The series 20 was powered by Pratt & Whitney JT9D turbofan engines, whereas the series 10 and 30 engines were General Electric CF6. Prior to taking delivery of the aircraft, Northwest's president asked that the "series 20" aircraft be redesignated "series 40" because the airliner was much improved over the original design. The FAA issued the certification for the series 40 on October 27, 1972. In 1972, the DC-10's listed unit cost was reportedly US$20M ($154 million in 2025 prices).

The series 30 and 40 were longer-range versions better suited for international flights. The main visible difference between the models is that the series 10 has three sets of landing gear (one front and two main) while the series 30 and 40 have an additional centerline main gear. The center main two-wheel landing gear (which extends from the center of the fuselage) was added to distribute the extra weight and for additional braking. The series 30 had a typical load range of 6,220 miles (5,410 nmi; 10,010 km) and a maximum payload range of 4,604 miles (4,001 nmi; 7,409 km). The series 40 had a typical load range of 5,750 miles (5,000 nmi; 9,250 km) and a maximum payload range of 4,030 miles (3,500 nmi; 6,490 km).

The DC-10 had two engine options and introduced longer-range variants a few years after entering service; these allowed it to distinguish itself from its main competitor, the L-1011. Further models and derivatives of the DC-10 have been considered; perhaps the most radical of these being an unpursued twin-engined model akin to the Airbus A300. However, following a spate of fatal accidents, particularly the American Airlines Flight 191 crash (the deadliest aviation accident in US history) orders for the DC-10 had nosedived by 1980, the type having garnered a poor reputation that was widespread amongst the traveling public as well as prospective operators. Competitive pressure had also played a role, Boeing in particular had developed the 747SP variant specifically to better compete with the DC-10 and L-1011.

In December 1988, the 446th and final DC-10 rolled off the Long Beach, California Products Division production line and was delivered to Nigeria Airways in July 1989. The production run had exceeded the 1971 estimate of 438 deliveries needed to break even on the program; however, according to Fielder, the DC-10 had not reached the breakeven point by the end of production. As the final DC-10s were delivered, McDonnell Douglas started production of its successor, the MD-11, which was essentially a stretched derivative of the DC-10-30.

In the late 1980s, international travel was on the rise due to lower oil prices and more economic freedom, leading to a surge in demand for wide-body airliners. However, the Boeing 747-400, MD-11, Airbus A330/A340, and soon-to-be-built Boeing 777 were all behind schedule and could not fully meet the demand. Production of first-generation widebodies like the Boeing 747-100/200/300, L-1011, and DC-10 had ended, so the value of used DC-10-30s almost doubled, rising from less than $20 million to almost $40 million.

== Design ==
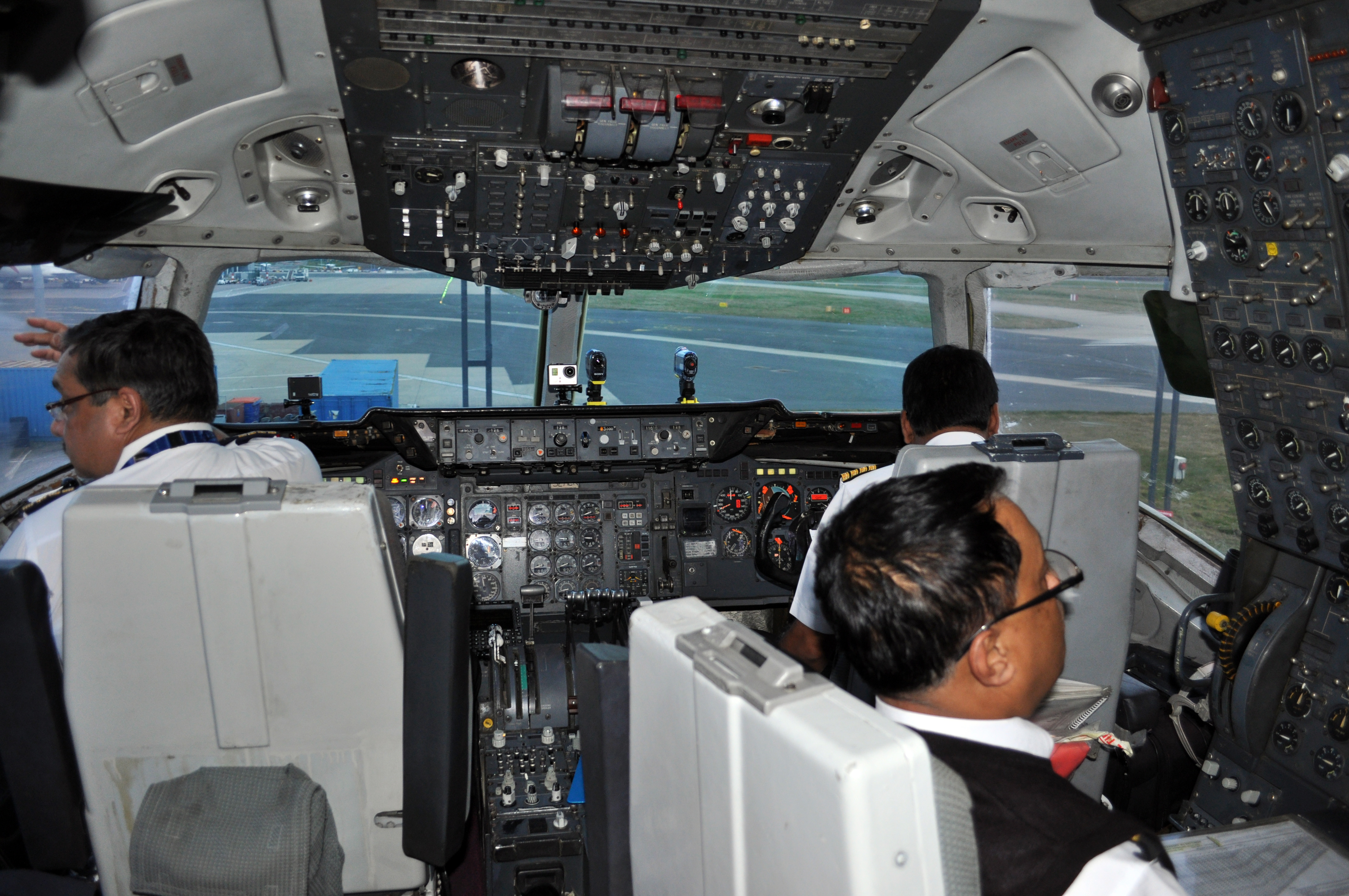
The DC-10 has a three-crew cockpit including a flight engineer.

The McDonnell Douglas DC-10 is a low-wing wide-body aircraft. It is sized to conduct medium to long-range flights, offering similar endurance to the larger Boeing 747 yet being able to use shorter runways and thus access airports that the 747 could not. Dependent upon configuration, the main cabin can accommodate between 250 and 380 passengers across its main deck. The fuselage is split into two levels, the upper deck is the only one where passenger seating would be present as the smaller lower level is typically used for storage for baggage and food preparation; elevators are usually present to carry people and carts between the two levels. As originally designed, the floor of the main cabin was not strong enough to withstand full pressure differential, yet key control lines are routed through this floor, an approach that proved to be a key vulnerability.

The DC-10 is a trijet, being powered by three turbofan engines. Two of these engines are mounted on pylons that attach to the bottom of the wings, while the third engine is encased in a protective banjo-shaped structure that is mounted on the top of the rear fuselage. In comparison to the first generation of jetliners, these engines generated less noise and were usually smoke-free. The engines are equipped with thrust reversers which reduce the distance required when landing. Despite being considerably larger, the landing speed of the DC-10 was comparable to that of the contemporary Boeing 727.

Cockpit of a KLM DC-10-30 with alternate gauge designs

The primary flight controls of the DC-10 consist of inboard and outboard ailerons, two-section elevators, and a two-section rudder; the secondary flight controls comprise leading edge slats, spoilers, and a dual-rate movable horizontal stabilizer. The vertical stabilizer with the rudder is mounted on top of the tail engine banjo while the horizontal stabilizer with its four-segment elevator is attached to the sides of the rear fuselage conventionally. The DC-10 is equipped with retractable tricycle landing gear. To enable higher gross weights, the later –30 and –40 series have an additional two-wheel main landing gear, which retracts into the center of the fuselage.

The DC-10 is capable of performing all-weather operations, a function that many preceding jetliners had been incapable of. From the onset, it could perform takeoffs and landings completely under autopilot. Cassette tapes were used to load preprogrammed flight plans into the flight computer. As originally built, the cockpit was operated by a flight crew of three; numerous DC-10s have received a retrofitted glass cockpit and the Advanced Common Flightdeck, which has "significant commonality" with that of the MD-11, thus eliminating the flight engineer and permitting the aircraft, re-designated MD-10, to be flown by a flight crew of two. Three independent hydraulic systems are present. The flight controls actuate many of the flight control surfaces across the airliner via these hydraulic circuits. The critical nature of these circuits and their vulnerability to damage in the tail area led to the addition of hydraulic fuses to prevent the total loss of fluid. Power for the hydraulics was derived from primary and reserve engine-driven pumps equipped on each of the three engines. Hydraulic power was required for flight control, there was no provision for reverting to manual flight control inputs.

== Variants ==
=== Domestic variants ===
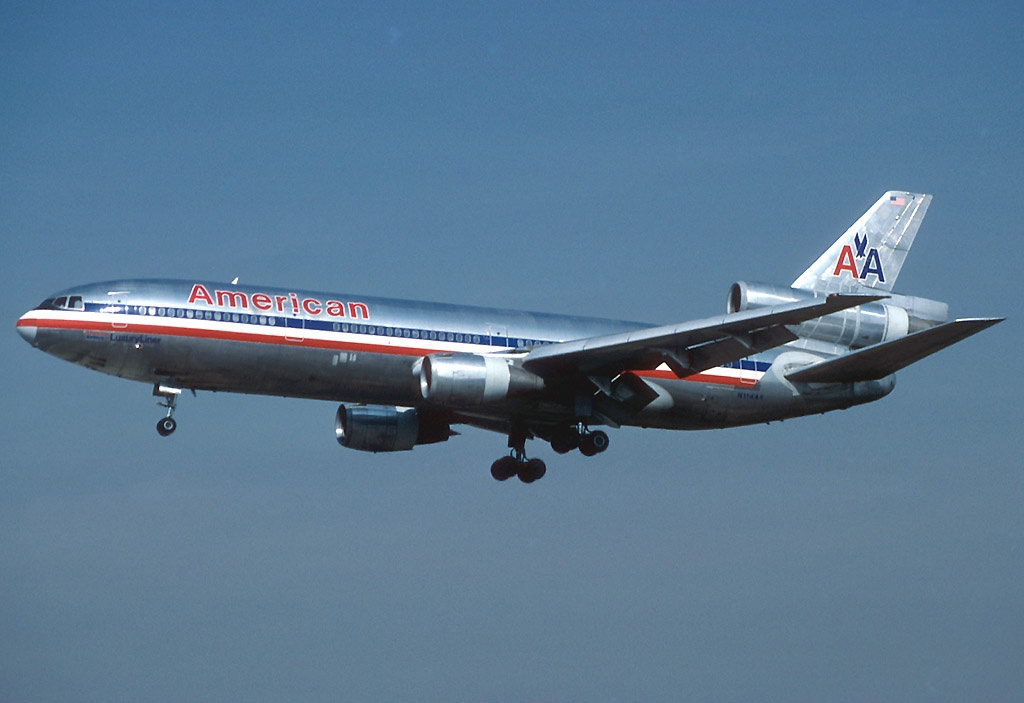
The initial DC-10-10, powered by three GE CF6s, has two main landing gear.

DC-10-10
The DC-10-10 is the initial passenger version introduced in 1971, produced from 1970 to 1981. The DC-10-10 was equipped with GE CF6-6 engines, which was the first civil engine version from the CF6 family. A total of 122 were built.

DC-10-10CF
The –10CF is a convertible passenger and cargo transport version of the –10. Eight were delivered to Continental Airlines and one to United Airlines.

DC-10-15
The –15 variant was designed for use at hot and high airports. The -15 is a –10 fitted with higher-thrust GE CF6-50C2F (derated DC-10-30 engines) powerplants. The –15 was first ordered in 1979 by Mexicana and Aeroméxico. Seven were completed between 1981 and 1983.

=== Long-range variants ===
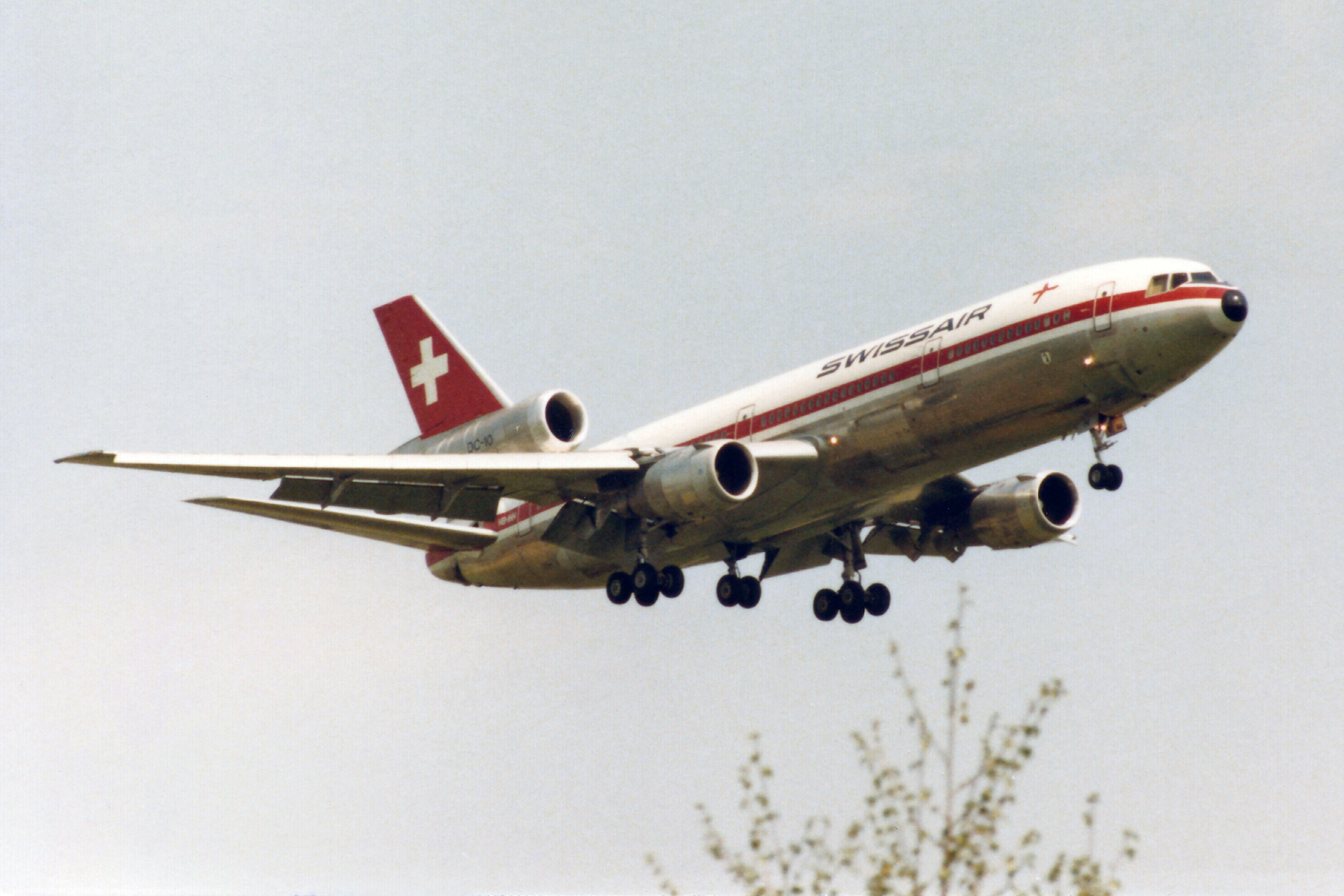
The heavier DC-10-30 has an additional center landing gear. The variant was first introduced into service by Swissair in 1972.

DC-10-30
A long-range model and the most common model produced. It was built with General Electric CF6-50 turbofan engines, with larger fuel tanks and a larger wingspan to increase range and fuel efficiency, and with a set of rear center landing gear to support the increased weight. It was very popular with European flag carriers. A total of 163 were built from 1972 to 1988 and delivered to 38 different customers. The model was first delivered to KLM and Swissair on November 21, 1972, and first introduced in service on December 15, 1972, by the latter.
DC-10-30CF
The convertible cargo/passenger transport version of the DC-10-30. The first deliveries were to Overseas National Airways (ONA) and Trans International Airlines in 1973. A total of 27 were built.
DC-10-30ER
The extended-range version of the DC-10-30. The –30ER aircraft has a higher maximum takeoff weight of 590,000 pounds (270 t); is powered by three GE CF6-50C2B engines each producing 54,000 lbf (240 kN) of thrust; and is equipped with an additional fuel tank in the rear cargo hold. It has an additional 700 mi of range to 6,600 mi (5,730 nmi; 10,620 km). The first of this variant was delivered to Finnair in 1981. A total of six were built and five –30s were later converted to –30ERs.
DC-10-30AF
Also known as the DC-10-30F. This was the all-freight version of the –30. Production was to start in 1979, but Alitalia did not confirm its order then. Production began in May 1984 after the first aircraft order from FedEx. A total of 10 were built.

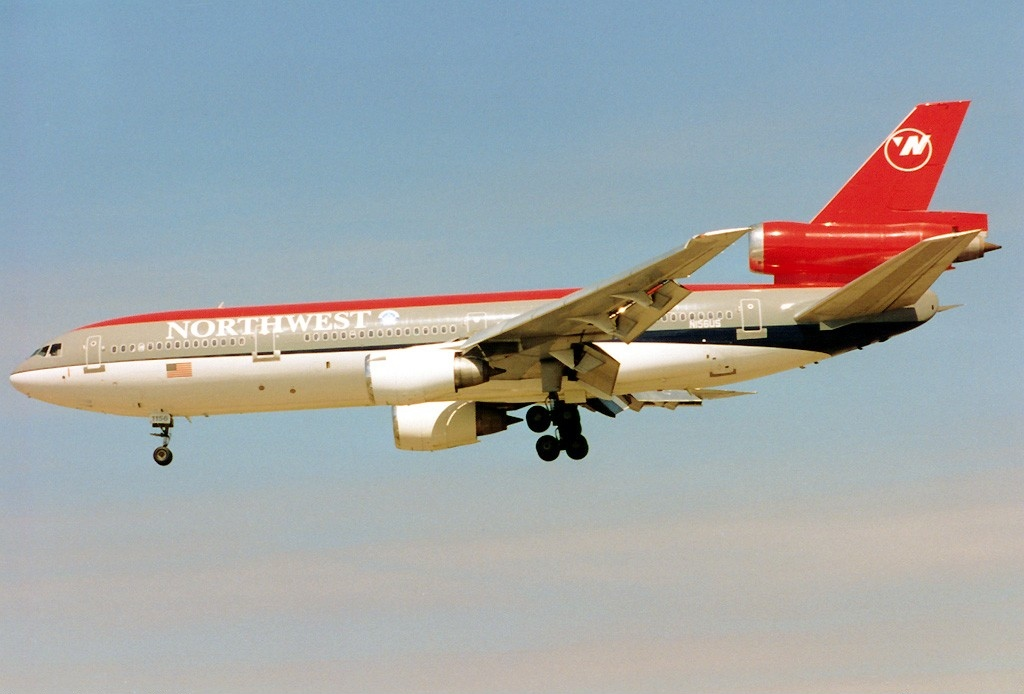
The heavy DC-10-40 was powered by three Pratt & Whitney JT9Ds as requested by launch customer Northwest Airlines.

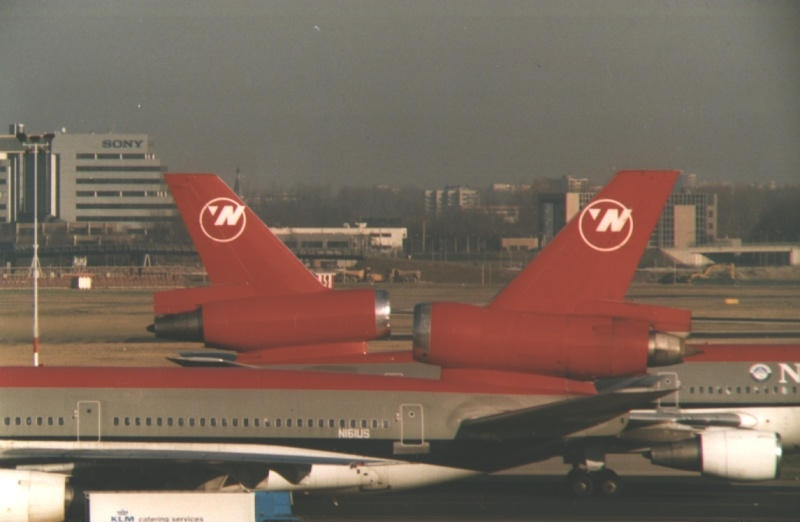
The tails of a DC-10-30 (on the left) and a DC-10-40 (on the right). The DC-10-40 has two bulged sections in the tail engine, compared to the DC-10-30's straight nacelle.

DC-10-40
Initial long-range model fitted with Pratt & Whitney JT9D engines, developed for Northwest Orient Airlines. The company wanted its aircraft to be equipped with the same engines as its Boeing 747s for fleet commonality. Originally designated DC-10-20, this model was renamed DC-10-40 at the airline's request, as its leadership did not want it to be perceived as inferior to the series 30 then in development. The aircraft was much improved compared to its original design, with a higher MTOW (on par with the Series 30) and more powerful engines, and retains the increased wingspan from the DC-10-30.
Northwest Orient Airlines and Japan Airlines were the only airlines to order the Series 40, ordering 22 and 20 aircraft, respectively. Northwest's aircraft used JT9D-20 engines producing 50,000 lbf (220 kN) of thrust and an MTOW of 555,000 pounds (252 t). The DC-10-40s delivered to Japan Airlines were equipped with improved JT9D-59A engines that produced increased thrust of 53,000 lbf (240 kN) and allowed a higher MTOW of 565,000 pounds (256 t).
Forty-two DC-10-40s were built from 1973 to 1983. Externally, the DC-10-40 can be distinguished from the DC-10-30 by a slight bulge near the front of the nacelle for the #2 (tail) engine.
DC-10-40D
A domestic variant for Japan Airlines

=== Proposed variants ===
==== DC-10-20 ====
A proposed version of the DC-10-10 with extra fuel tanks, 3-foot (91 cm) extensions on each wingtip, and a rear center landing gear. It was to use Pratt & Whitney JT9D-15 turbofan engines, each producing 45,500 lbf (202 kN) of thrust, with a maximum takeoff weight of 530,000 pounds (240 t). However, engine improvements led to increased thrust and increased takeoff weight. Northwest Orient Airlines, one of the launch customers for this longer-range DC-10 requested the name change to DC-10-40.

==== DC-10-50 ====
A proposed version with Rolls-Royce RB211-524 engines for British Airways. The order never came and the plans for the DC-10-50 were abandoned after British Airways ordered the Lockheed L-1011-500 instead.

==== DC-10 Twin ====
Beginning in 1966, two-engine designs were studied for the DC-10 before the design settled on the three-engine configuration. Later, a big twin based on the DC-10 cross-section was proposed to Airbus as a 50/50 venture but was rejected. Then in 1971, a shortened DC-10 version with two engines was proposed as a competitor to the Airbus A300. McDonnell Douglas held a major presentation of the proposed DC-10 Twin at Long Beach, and several European airlines were willing to place orders. However on July 30, 1973, the McDonnell Douglas board decided not to give the proposed twin the go-ahead, as no US airline had ordered it. Later, more DC-10 Twin proposals were made, either as a collaboration with a European manufacturer or as a solely McDonnell Douglas product, but none proceeded beyond design studies.

=== Tanker versions ===
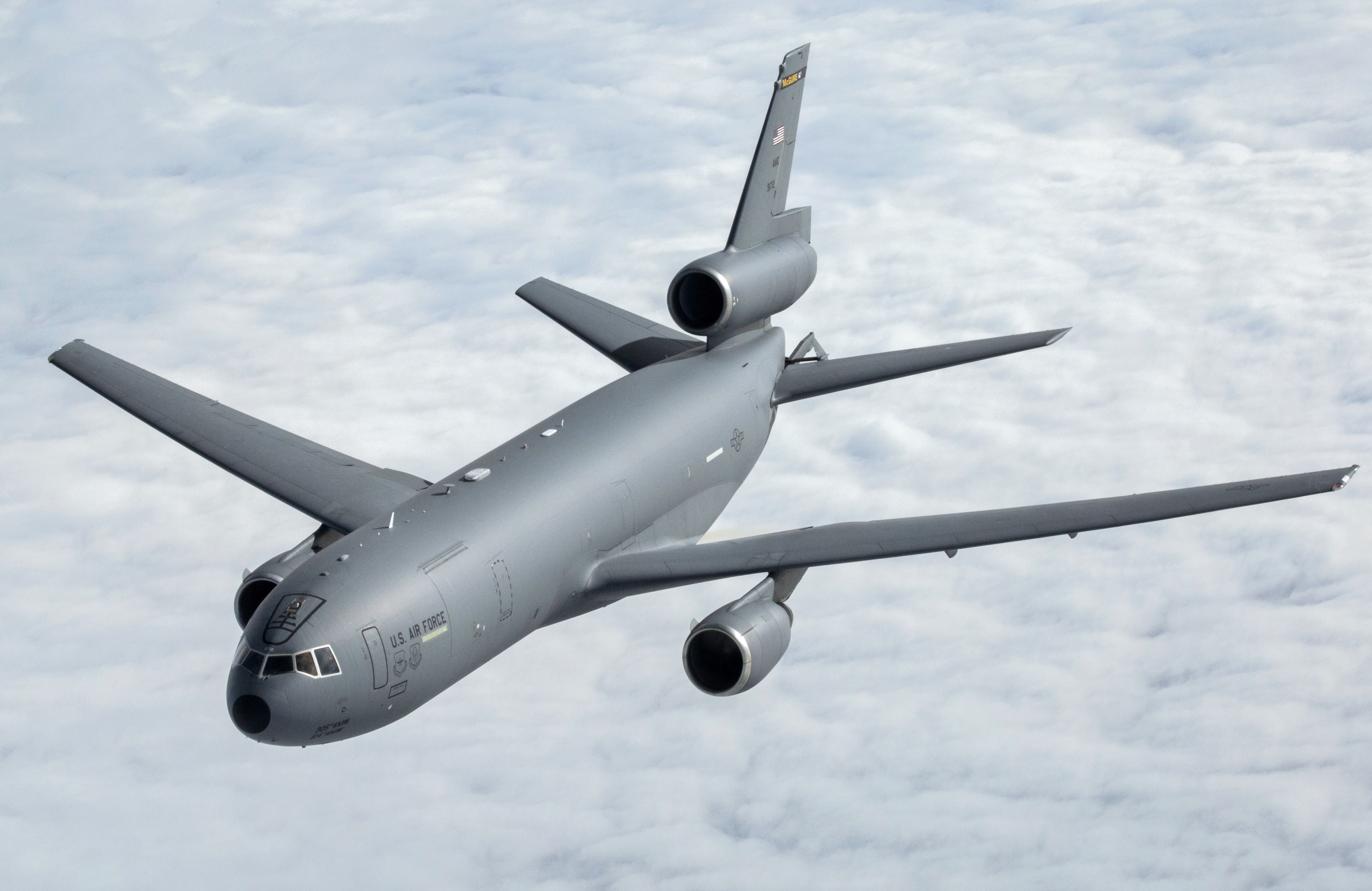
The KC-10 Extender, a USAF aerial tanker

The KC-10 Extender was a military version of the DC-10-30CF for aerial refueling. The aircraft was ordered by the US Air Force and delivered from 1981 to 1988. A total of 60 were built. These aircraft are powered exclusively by General Electric CF6 turbofan engines.

The KDC-10 was an aerial refueling tanker for the Royal Netherlands Air Force. These were converted from civil airliners (DC-10-30CF or DC-10-40I) to a similar standard as the KC-10. Also, commercial refueling companies Omega Aerial Refueling Services and Global Airtanker Service operate three KDC-10 tankers for lease.

The DC-10 Air Tanker is a DC-10-based firefighting tanker aircraft, using modified water tanks from Erickson Air-Crane.

=== MD-10 upgrade ===
The MD-10 is an upgrade to add a glass cockpit to the DC-10 with the re-designation to MD-10. The upgrade included an Advanced Common Flightdeck similar to what was used on the MD-11 and was launched in September 1996. However, the actual avionics are shared with the Boeing 717, using the Honeywell VIA liquid-crystal-displays. The program was continued by Boeing after its merger with McDonnell Douglas in 1997, and the first MD-10 flew on April 14, 1999. The new cockpit eliminated the need for the flight engineer position and allowed common type rating with the MD-11. This has allowed companies such as FedEx Express, which operated both the MD-10 and MD-11, to use a common pilot pool for both aircraft.

== Operators ==
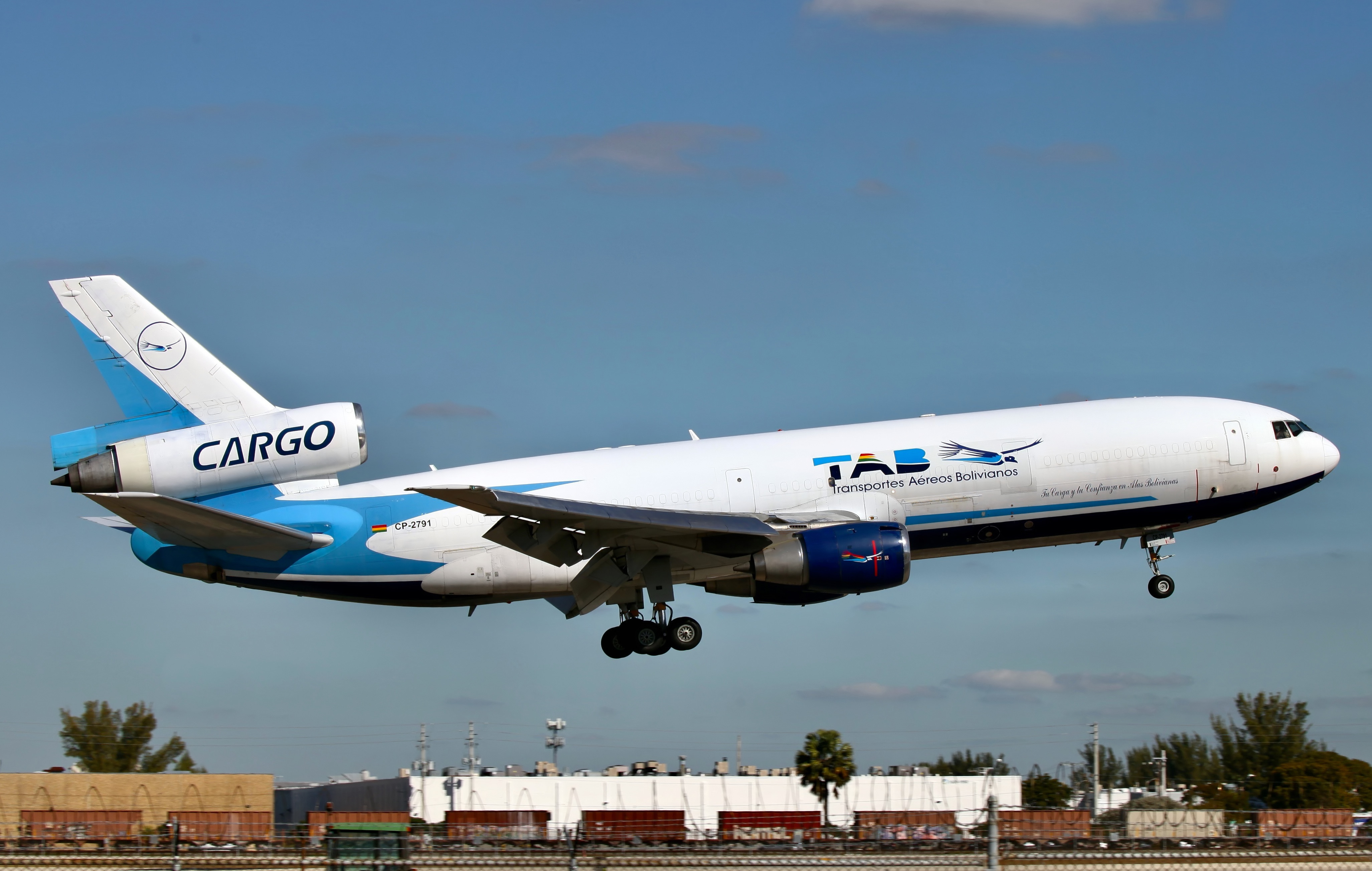
This Transportes Aéreos Bolivianos (TAB) MD-10-30F is one of the last DC-10s in commercial service as of 2024. The aircraft was converted from a DC-10-30F to an MD-10-30F in 2009.

On January 8, 2007, Northwest Airlines retired its last remaining DC-10 from scheduled passenger service, thus ending the aircraft's operations with major airlines. Regarding the retirement of Northwest's DC-10 fleet, Wade Blaufuss, spokesman for the Northwest chapter of the Air Line Pilots Association said, "The DC-10 is a reliable airplane, fun to fly, roomy and quiet, kind of like flying an old Cadillac Fleetwood. We're sad to see an old friend go." Biman Bangladesh Airlines was the last commercial carrier to operate the DC-10 in passenger service. The airline flew the DC-10 on a regular passenger flight for the last time on February 20, 2014, from Dhaka, Bangladesh to Birmingham, UK. Local charter flights were flown in the UK until February 24, 2014. As of September 2024, two MD-10-30Fs are in commercial service, one with TAB Airlines, a Bolivian cargo airline operating scheduled flights in the Americas, and one with the Panamanian start-up Cargo Three, also in the Americas.

Non-airline operators included Omega Aerial Refueling Services with DC-10 based KDC-10-30 and KDC-10-40 tanker aircraft and the 10 Tanker Air Carrier with four modified DC-10-30s used for fighting wildfires. Orbis International had used a DC-10-10 as a flying eye hospital. Surgery is performed on the ground and the operating room is located between the wings for maximum stability. In 2008, Orbis replaced its aging DC-10-10 with a MD-10-30 donated by FedEx. The aircraft had previously been converted into an MD-10 by FedEx and began flying as an eye hospital in 2010. A modified DC-10 is operated by the Missile Defense Agency as the Widebody Airborne Sensor Platform (WASP).

=== Airworthy aircraft ===
As of December 2024, there are 10 aircraft that are airworthy:

- one with Transportes Aéreos Bolivianos (TAB) cargo services (MD-10-30F);
- one as Orbis International (OI) flying hospital (MD-10-30F);
- four as 10 Tanker aerial firefighting service as DC-10 Air Tanker (DC-10-30);
- three with Omega Aerial Refueling Services (OARS) as KDC-10-30/-40;
  - N974VV as a last-flying PW-engined DC-10;
- one with Cargo Three cargo services (MD-10-30F).

== Accidents and incidents ==
As of February 2025, the DC-10 had been involved in 55 accidents and incidents, including 32 hull-loss accidents, with 1,261 occupant fatalities. Of these accidents and incidents, it has been involved in nine hijackings resulting in one death and a bombing resulting in 170 occupant fatalities. Despite its poor safety record in the 1970s, which gave it an unfavorable reputation, the DC-10 has proved to be a reliable aircraft with a low overall accident rate as of 1998. The DC-10's initially poor safety record has continuously improved as design flaws were rectified and fleet hours increased. The DC-10's lifetime safety record is comparable only to the Fokker F28 Fellowship, Airbus A300, Airbus A310, and the DC-10's mechanical successor, the McDonnell Douglas MD-11, with all of these having accident rates more than double the average.

=== Cargo door issues ===
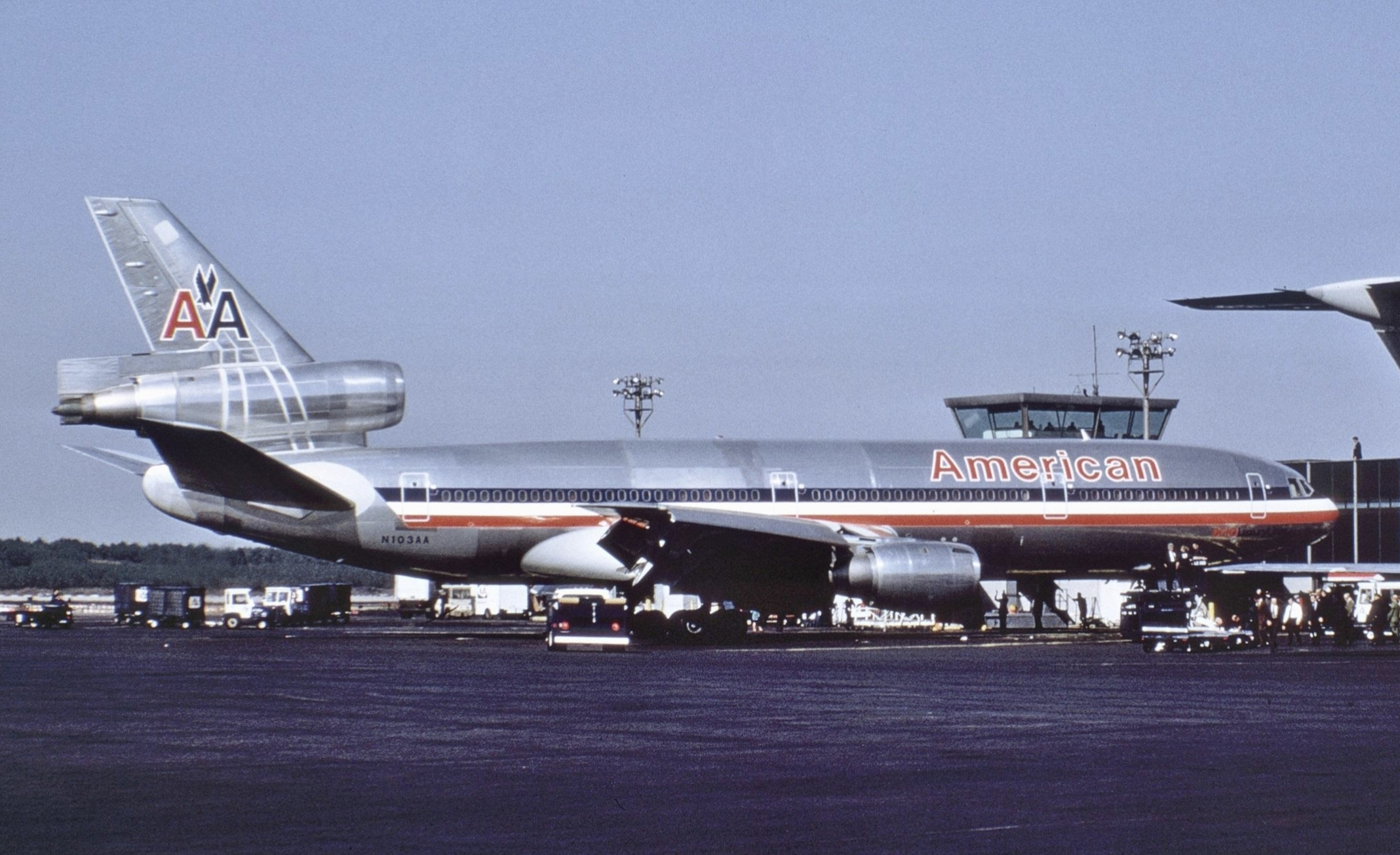

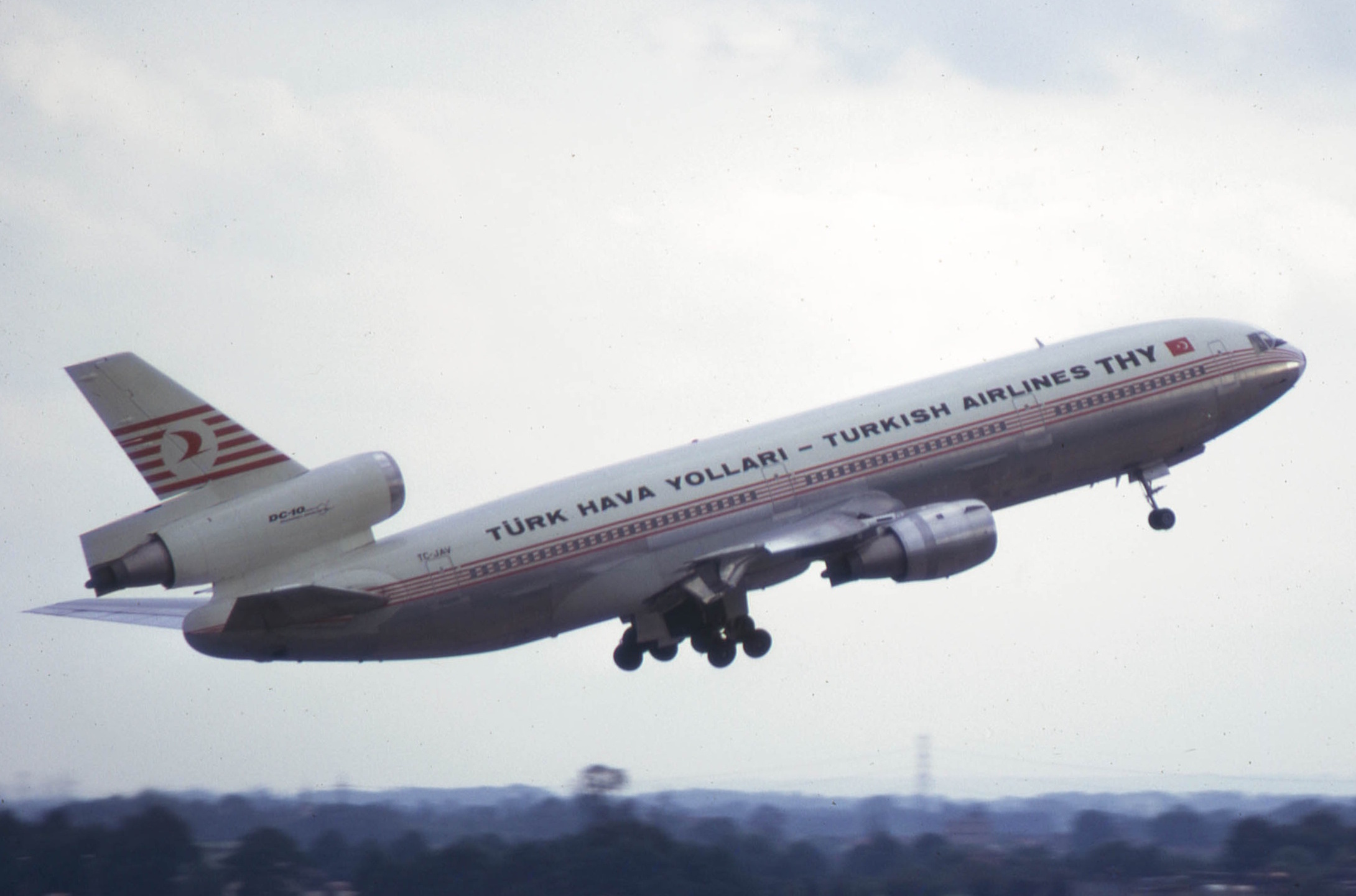
The DC-10s involved in American Airlines Flight 96 (top) and Turkish Airlines Flight 981 (bottom)

The DC-10 has cargo doors that open outward; this allows the cargo area to be completely filled, as the doors do not occupy otherwise usable interior space when open. To overcome the outward force from pressurization of the fuselage at high altitudes, outward-opening doors must use heavy locking mechanisms. In the event of a door lock malfunction, there is greater potential for explosive decompression.

On June 12, 1972, American Airlines Flight 96 lost its aft cargo door above Windsor, Ontario. Before takeoff, the door appeared secure, but the internal locking mechanism was not fully engaged. When the aircraft reached approximately 11,750 feet (3,580 m) in altitude, the door blew out, and the resulting explosive decompression collapsed the cabin floor. Many control cables to the empennage were cut, leaving the pilots with very limited control of the aircraft. Despite this, the crew performed a safe emergency landing. US National Transportation Safety Board (NTSB) investigators found the cargo-door design to be dangerously flawed, as the door could be closed without the locking mechanism fully engaged, and this condition was not apparent from visual inspection of the door nor from the cargo-door indicator in the cockpit. The NTSB recommended modifications to make it readily apparent to baggage handlers when the door was not secured and also recommended adding vents to the cabin floor so that the pressure difference between the cabin and cargo bay during decompression could quickly equalize without causing further damage. Although many carriers voluntarily modified the cargo doors, no airworthiness directive was issued, due to a gentlemen's agreement between the head of the FAA, John H. Shaffer, and the head of McDonnell Douglas's aircraft division, Jackson McGowen. McDonnell Douglas made some modifications to the cargo door, but the basic design remained unchanged, and problems persisted.

On March 3, 1974, in an accident circumstantially similar to American Airlines Flight 96, a cargo-door blowout caused Turkish Airlines Flight 981 to crash near Ermenonville, France; with 346 passengers and crew fatalities, this was the deadliest air crash at the time, and it remains the deadliest single-aircraft accident without survivors. The cargo door of Flight 981 had not been fully locked, though it appeared so to both cockpit crew and ground personnel. The Turkish aircraft had a seating configuration that exacerbated the effects of decompression, and as the cabin floor collapsed into the cargo bay, control cables were severed and the aircraft became uncontrollable. Investigators found that the DC-10's relief vents were not large enough to equalize the pressure between the passenger and cargo compartments during explosive decompression. Following this crash, a special subcommittee of the United States House of Representatives investigated the cargo-door issue and the certification by the Federal Aviation Administration (FAA) of the original design. An airworthiness directive was issued, and all DC-10s underwent mandatory door modifications. The DC-10 experienced no more major incidents related to its cargo door after FAA-approved changes were made.

=== Engine-related accidents ===
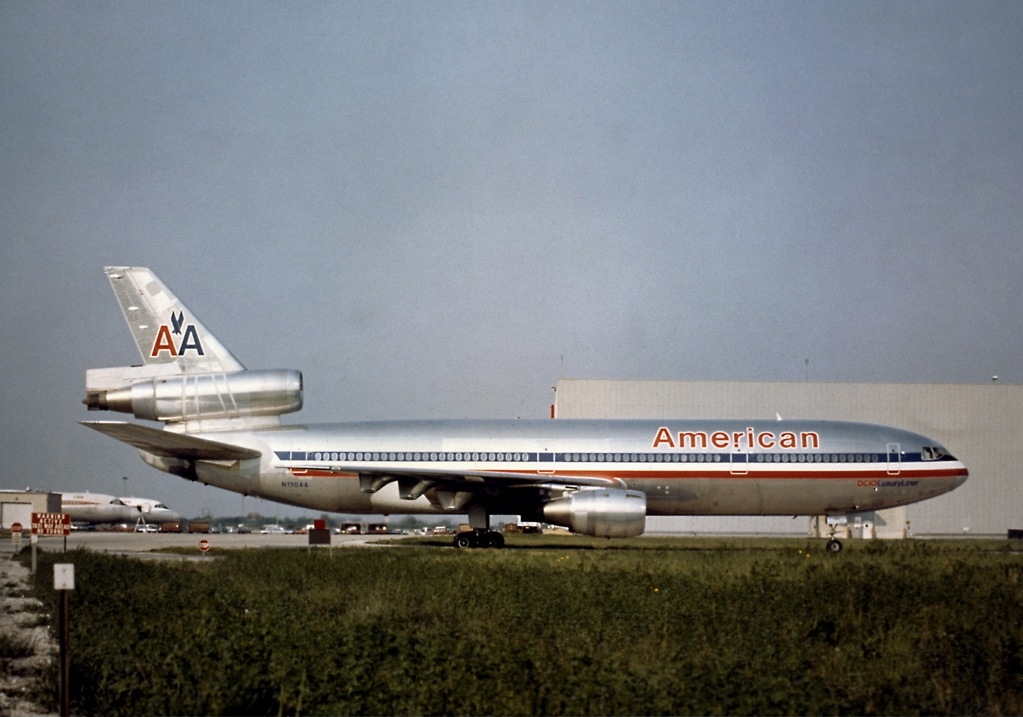
The DC-10 involved in American Airlines Flight 191

On May 25, 1979, American Airlines Flight 191 crashed immediately after takeoff from Chicago O'Hare Airport. Its left engine and pylon assembly swung upward over the top of the wing and fell away, severing the leading edge slat actuator hydraulic lines. The slats retracted under the aerodynamic forces, causing the left wing to stall. This, combined with asymmetric thrust due to the missing engine, caused the aircraft to rapidly roll to the left, descend, and crash, killing all 271 people on board and two on the ground. Following the crash, the FAA withdrew the DC-10's type certificate on June 6, 1979, grounding all US-registered DC-10s and those from nations with agreements with the United States, and banning all DC-10s from US airspace. These measures were rescinded five weeks later on July 13, 1979, after the slat actuation and position systems were modified, along with stall warning and power supply changes. In November 1979, the FAA fined American Airlines for removing the engine and its pylon as a single unit in its maintenance procedure, thus damaging the structure and causing the engine separation, rather than removing the engine from the pylon before removing the pylon from the wing as advised by McDonnell Douglas.

On July 19, 1989, United Airlines Flight 232 crashed at Sioux City, Iowa, after an uncontained engine failure of the tail engine earlier in the flight disabled all hydraulic systems and rendered most flight controls inoperable. The flight crew, assisted by a deadheading DC-10 flight instructor, performed a partially controlled emergency landing by constantly adjusting the thrust of the remaining two engines; 184 people on board survived, but 112 others died, and the aircraft was destroyed. The DC-10 was designed without backup flight controls because it was considered extremely improbable that all hydraulic systems would fail. However, due to their close proximity under the tail engine, the engine failure ruptured all three, resulting in a total loss of control of the elevators, ailerons, spoilers, horizontal stabilizers, rudder, flaps, and slats. Following the accident, hydraulic fuses were installed in the #3 hydraulic system below the tail engine on all DC-10 aircraft to ensure that sufficient control remains if all three hydraulic systems are damaged in this area.

On November 14, 2025, the FAA issued an emergency airworthiness directive (EAD) grounding the US DC-10 fleet in the aftermath of UPS Airlines Flight 2976, an MD-11 which crashed ten days earlier after an engine pylon separation circumstantially similar to American Airlines Flight 191; the MD-11 is a direct derivative of the DC-10 with similar engine pylons. An initial EAD grounded the MD-11 only, but a November 14 revision extended the order to the DC-10. The updated EAD primarily affected 10 Tanker Air Carrier and Omega Aerial Refueling Services, which operated most of the remaining airworthy US-based DC-10s. The EAD grounded an affected aircraft until "[it] is inspected and all applicable corrective actions are performed" under protocols that were yet to be approved. On May 11, 2026, the FAA ended the grounding when it approved a Boeing inspection and maintenance protocol to address fatigue-related cracks that can cause failures of the aft engine pylon mounting lug. FedEx said that two of its MD-11 aircraft had been repaired and returned to service.

=== Other accidents with fatalities ===
- November 3, 1973: National Airlines Flight 27, a DC-10-10 cruising at 39,000 feet (12,000 m), experienced an uncontained failure of the right engine. One cabin window separated from the fuselage after it was struck by debris flung from the exploding engine. The passenger sitting next to that window was killed and ejected from the aircraft. The crew initiated an emergency descent and landed the aircraft safely.
- March 1, 1978: Continental Airlines Flight 603, a DC-10-10, commenced a takeoff from Los Angeles International Airport when the recapped tread of a tire on the left main landing gear separated, causing the blowout of two adjacent tires, which ruptured a fuel tank. This, combined with excessive heat from the rejected takeoff, resulted in a massive fire. Two passengers were killed in the ensuing evacuation and two died later from injuries sustained in the accident.
- October 31, 1979: Western Airlines Flight 2605, a DC-10-10, collided with construction equipment after landing on a closed runway at Mexico City International Airport, killing 72 of the 88 people on board and one person on the ground. The crash was caused by failure to follow proper landing guidelines in consideration of the fog on the runway.
- November 28, 1979: Air New Zealand Flight 901, DC-10-30 ZK-NZP, crashed into Mount Erebus on Ross Island, Antarctica during a sightseeing flight over the continent, killing all 257 on board. The accident was caused by the flight coordinates being altered without the flight crew's knowledge, combined with unique Antarctic weather conditions.
- January 23, 1982: World Airways Flight 30, DC-10-30CF registration N113WA, overran the runway at Boston Logan International Airport and slid into the shallow water of Boston Harbor. Two of the 200 passengers were not found; all other passengers and the 12 crew members survived.
- September 13, 1982: Spantax Flight 995, DC-10-30CF EC-DEG, was destroyed by fire after an aborted take-off at Málaga, Spain. A total of 50 passengers were killed and 110 injured due to the flames.
- July 24, 1987: Air Afrique Flight 056, flying from Fiumicino Airport, Italy, to Charles de Gaulle Airport, France, was hijacked immediately after departure. The aircraft thereafter landed at Geneva, Switzerland, for refueling. During the stopover, the hijacker executed a 28-year-old passenger. The aircraft was later stormed by Swiss police and the hijacker was subdued.
- July 27, 1989: Korean Air Flight 803, DC-10-30 HL7328, crashed short of the runway in bad weather while trying to land at Tripoli, Libya. Seventy-five of the 199 on board plus another four people on the ground were killed in the accident.
- September 19, 1989: UTA Flight 772, DC-10-30 N54629, crashed in the Ténéré Desert in Niger following an in-flight bomb explosion, killing all 170 people on board.
- December 21, 1992: Martinair Flight 495, DC-10-30CF PH-MBN, crashed while landing in bad weather at Faro, Portugal, killing 54 passengers and crew.
- June 13, 1996: Garuda Indonesia Flight 865, DC-10-30 PK-GIE, had just taken off from Fukuoka Airport, Japan, when a high-pressure blade from the right engine separated. The aircraft was just a few feet above the runway, and the pilot decided to abort the takeoff. Consequently, the DC-10 skidded off the runway and came to a halt 1,600 ft (490 m) past it, losing one of its engines and its landing gear. Three passengers perished in the accident.
- December 21, 1999: Cubana de Aviación Flight 1216, DC-10-30 F-GTDI, overran the runway at La Aurora International Airport, Guatemala City. Eight passengers and eight crew members on board were killed, as were two people on the ground.

=== Other hull losses ===
- December 17, 1973: Iberia Airlines Flight 933 crashed and struck the ALS system at Boston Logan International Airport which collapsed the front landing gear. All 168 passengers and crew survived. This is the first hull loss of a DC-10 aircraft.
- November 12, 1975: Overseas National Airways (ONA) Flight 032, DC-10-30CF N1032F, accelerated through a flock of seagulls during its takeoff roll from John F. Kennedy International Airport on a ferry flight. The captain initiated a rejected takeoff, but the right-hand engine sustained an uncontained failure, causing partial failures of the braking and hydraulic systems and blowouts of several main landing gear tires. The pilots steered off the runway to avoid plowing into a blast fence, collapsing the landing gear and rupturing a fuel tank; the ensuing fire destroyed the aircraft. All 139 on board—all ONA employees—survived with 32 suffering injuries. General Electric Aircraft Engines dissented from the NTSB's conclusion that the bird strike caused the accident, stating that the engine failure was caused by ingestion of debris from a wheel and tire failure prior to the collision with the gulls.
- January 2, 1976: Saudi Arabian Airlines Flight 5130, DC-10-30CF N1031F leased from ONA, landed short of the runway at Istanbul-Yesilköy Airport, tearing off the left-hand engine and the left and center main landing gear. All 362 passengers evacuated safely while one of thirteen crew members was injured. The accident was attributed to an excessively low approach, possibly caused by the first officer using the radar altimeter for altitude reference over irregular terrain.
- December 3, 1983: Korean Air Lines Flight 084, DC-10-30 freighter HL7339, collided head-on during the takeoff roll with SouthCentral Air Flight 59, Piper PA-31 N35206, which was taking off from Anchorage International Airport. The Piper struck the DC-10's left and center main landing gear and three passengers sustained minor injuries; the DC-10 overran the runway and the three crew suffered serious injuries. Investigators determined that the Korean Air Lines pilot became disoriented taxiing in fog, failed to follow correct procedures and confirm his position, and accidentally initiated takeoff from the wrong runway.
- May 21, 1988: American Airlines Flight 70, DC-10-30 N136AA, overran Runway 35L at Dallas/Fort Worth International Airport (DFW) after the flight crew attempted a rejected takeoff. Two crew were seriously injured and the remaining 12 crew and 240 passengers escaped safely. The accident was attributed to a shortcoming in the original design standards; no requirement had existed to test whether partially worn brake pads could stop the aircraft during a rejected takeoff, and 8 of the 10 worn pad sets had failed.
- April 14, 1993: American Airlines Flight 102, DC-10-30 N139AA, skidded off the runway on landing at DFW in a rainstorm, collapsing the nose and left main landing gear and badly damaging the left-hand engine and wing. Two passengers suffered serious injuries during the emergency evacuation, while the remaining 187 passengers and 13 crew escaped safely. The NTSB attributed the crash to poor directional control technique by the captain.
- September 5, 1996: FedEx Express Flight 1406, DC-10-10F N68055, suffered an in-flight cargo fire while flying from Memphis, Tennessee to Boston, Massachusetts. The aircraft made a successful emergency landing at Stewart International Airport in Newburgh, New York, however after evacuating all 5 crew members the aircraft was consumed by fire and destroyed.
- December 18, 2003: FedEx Express Flight 647, MD-10-10F N364FE, was destroyed by fire after the right main landing gear collapsed due to a hard landing at Memphis International Airport. One of the two pilots and one of the five passengers—all deadheading FedEx employees—suffered minor injuries in the emergency evacuation.
- July 28, 2006: FedEx Express Flight 630, MD-10-10F N391FE, departed runway 18R and burned out at Memphis International Airport following the collapse of the left main landing gear. The two pilots and a single passenger suffered minor injuries during the emergency evacuation. The accident was attributed to improper landing gear maintenance.
- October 28, 2016: FedEx Express Flight 910, MD-10-10F N370FE, partially exited the runway at Ft. Lauderdale-Hollywood International Airport following the collapse of the left main landing gear. The accident was attributed to improper landing gear maintenance.

=== Other notable incidents ===
- November 26, 1975: American Airlines Flight 182, a DC-10-10, was involved in a near mid-air collision with TWA Flight 37, a L-1011, over Michigan. 24 on board the DC-10 were injured.
- February 28, 1984: Scandinavian Airlines System Flight 901, DC-10-30 LN-RKB, overran the runway on landing at John F. Kennedy International Airport. All 177 passengers and crew members on board survived with 12 suffering injuries. The runway overshoot was attributed to the crew's failure to monitor their airspeed, and their overreliance on the autothrottle.
- April 7, 1994: The flight crew of Federal Express Flight 705, DC-10-30 N306FE, was attacked by a deadheading FedEx employee in an attempted murder–suicide intended to cause the aircraft to crash. The seriously injured crew returned to Memphis International Airport after subduing the hijacker, using aerobatic maneuvers and damaging the aircraft in the process. The aircraft was repaired and returned in service.
- July 25, 2000: The right-hand thrust reverser cowl door of Continental Airlines Flight 55, DC-10-30 N13067, shed a strip of metal which landed on the runway at Charles de Gaulle Airport upon takeoff. Minutes later, Air France Flight 4590, operated by a Concorde, ran over the metal strip at high speed, bursting a tire and causing a fuel tank to rupture and burst into flames. The Concorde's pilots attempted to keep control of the aircraft, but it stalled and crashed. The strip of metal was traced to third-party replacement parts not approved by the FAA.
- January 31, 2001: Japan Airlines Flight 958, DC-10-40D JA8546, was involved in a midair near collision with a Japan Airlines Boeing 747-400 near Yaizu. Both flight crews performed evasive maneuvers; all 677 aboard both aircraft survived, with nine aboard the 747-400 seriously injured.

== Aircraft on display ==
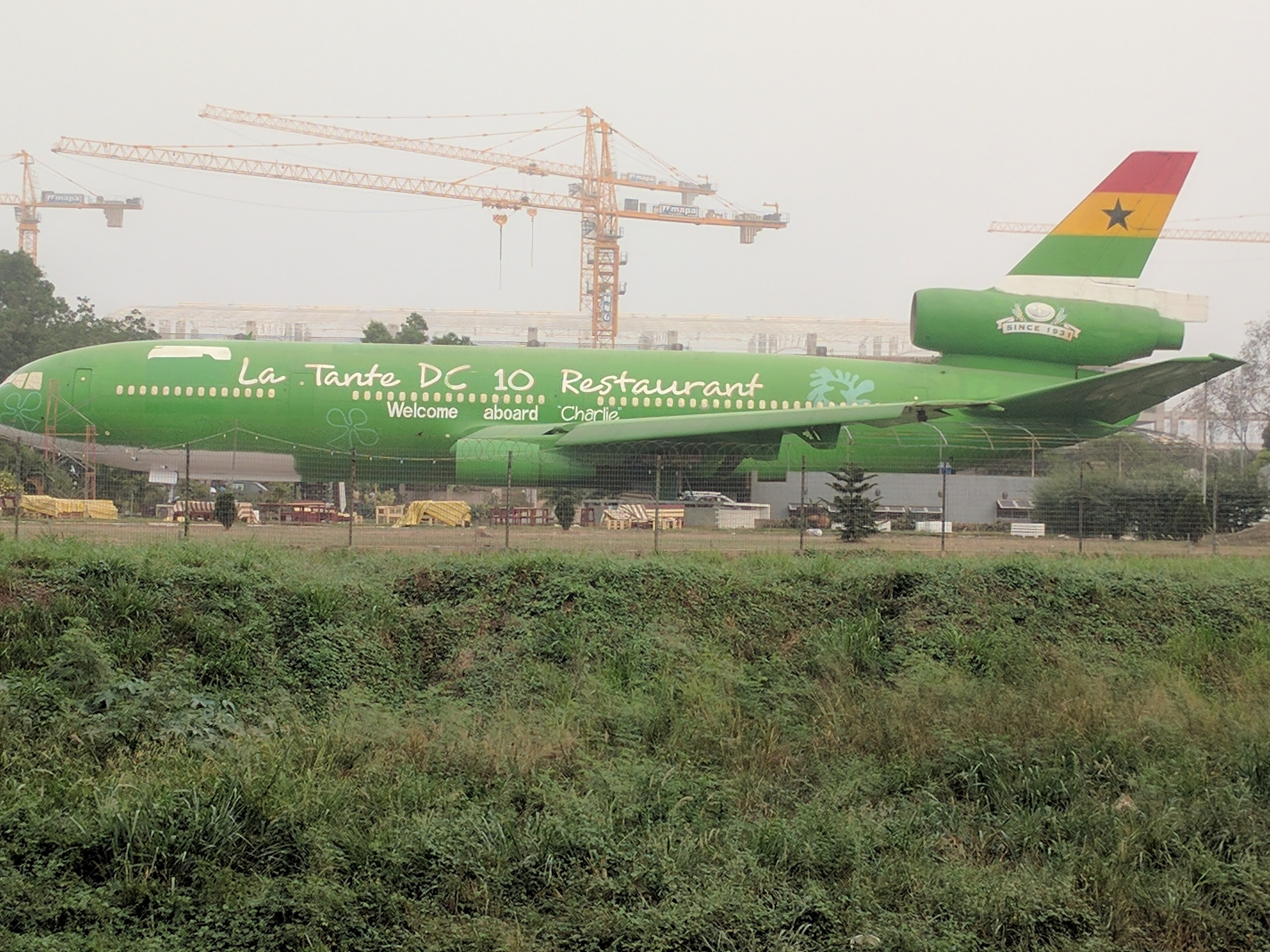
DC-10-30 9G-ANB in use as the La Tante DC10 Restaurant in Accra, Ghana. The restaurant closed in 2023 and the aircraft was scrapped.

- The preserved forward fuselage segment of Monarch Airlines' DC-10-30, G-DMCA, is on display at Manchester Airport Runway Visitor Park, where it is used for teaching and school visits.
- DC-10-30 ZK-NZS formerly operated by Air New Zealand. The aircraft subsequently saw service with Lan-Chile, Scandinavian Airlines, and AOM French Airlines, before being retired and stored at José Martí International Airport in Havana, Cuba, in 2003, where it was later repurposed as an airport emergency services trainer. It was subsequently secured by Paul Brennan of the "Bring Our Birds Home" campaign, with plans for its transport to the National Transport & Toy Museum in Wanaka, New Zealand for eventual restoration and display.
- DC-10-10 N220AU "Flying Eye Hospital" previously owned by Orbis International was retired in 2016 following its replacement with another DC-10, and is currently on display at the Pima Air & Space Museum in Tucson, Arizona.
- DC-10-30 Z-AVT "Victor Trimble" previously owned by British Caledonian Airways is partially preserved as a nightclub in Bali. The tail end of the aircraft featuring the third engine is mounted on a rooftop in Bali.

== Specifications ==
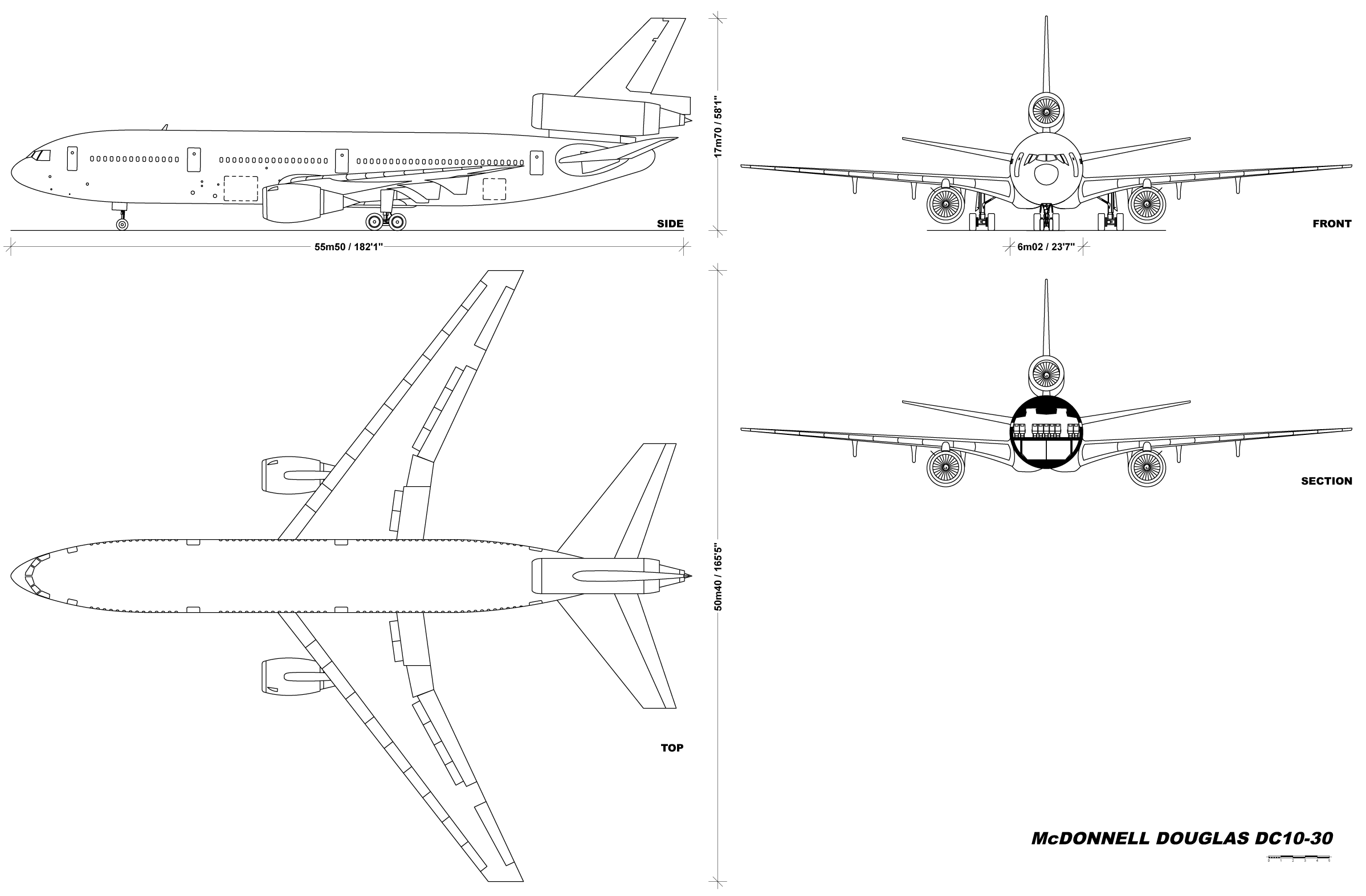
The schematic of the McDonnell Douglas DC-10-30 (side, top, front, cross-section)

DC-10 Airplane Characteristics
Variant	-10	-30	-40
Cockpit crew	Three		
Std. seating	270 (222Y 8-abreast @ 34 in + 48J 6-abreast @ 38 in)		
Max. seating	399Y (10-abreast @ 29–34 in pitch) layout, FAA exit limit: 380		
Cargo	26 LD3 layout, main deck: 22 88×125 in or 30 88×108 in pallets		
Length	182 ft 3.1 in / 55.55 m	181 ft 7.2 in / 55.35 m	182 ft 2.6 in / 55.54 m
Height	57 ft 6 in / 17.53 m	57 ft 7 in / 17.55 m	
Wingspan	155 ft 4 in / 47.35 m	165 ft 4 in / 50.39 m	
Wing area	3,550 sq ft (330 m^{2})	3,647 sq ft (338.8 m^{2})	
Width	19 ft 9 in (6.02 m) fuselage, 224 in (569 cm) interior		
Operating empty weight (OEW) (pax)	240,171 lb / 108,940 kg	266,191 lb / 120,742 kg	270,213 lb / 122,567 kg
Maximum take-off weight (MTOW)	430,000 lb / 195,045 kg	555,000 lb / 251,744 kg	
Max. payload	94,829 lb / 43,014 kg	101,809 lb / 46,180 kg	97,787 lb 44,356 kg
Fuel capacity	21,762 US gal (82,380 L; 18,121 imp gal)	36,652 US gal (138,740 L; 30,519 imp gal)	
Engines ×3	GE CF6-6D	GE CF6-50C	PW JT9D-20 / -59A
Thrust ×3	40,000 lbf / 177.92 kN	51,000 lbf / 226.85 kN	53,000 lbf / 235.74 kN
Cruise	Mach 0.82 (473 kn; 876 km/h; 544 mph) typical, Mach 0.88 (507 kn; 940 km/h; 584 mph) MMo		
Range (Note: Mach 0.82, 270 pax @ 205 lb or 93 kg each)	3,500 nmi (6,500 km; 4,000 mi)	5,200 nmi (9,600 km; 6,000 mi)	5,100 nmi (9,400 km; 5,900 mi)
Takeoff (Note: MTOW, SL, ISA)	9,000 ft (2,700 m)	10,500 ft (3,200 m)	9,500 ft (2,900 m)
Ceiling	42,000 ft (12,800 m)		

== Deliveries ==
Deliveries by year
1971	1972	1973	1974	1975	1976	1977	1978	1979	1980	1981	1982	1983	1984	1985	1986	1987	1988	1989	Total
13	52	57	47	43	19	14	18	35	41	25	11	12	10	11	17	10	10	1	446

Note: Deliveries include 60 military KC-10 aircraft.

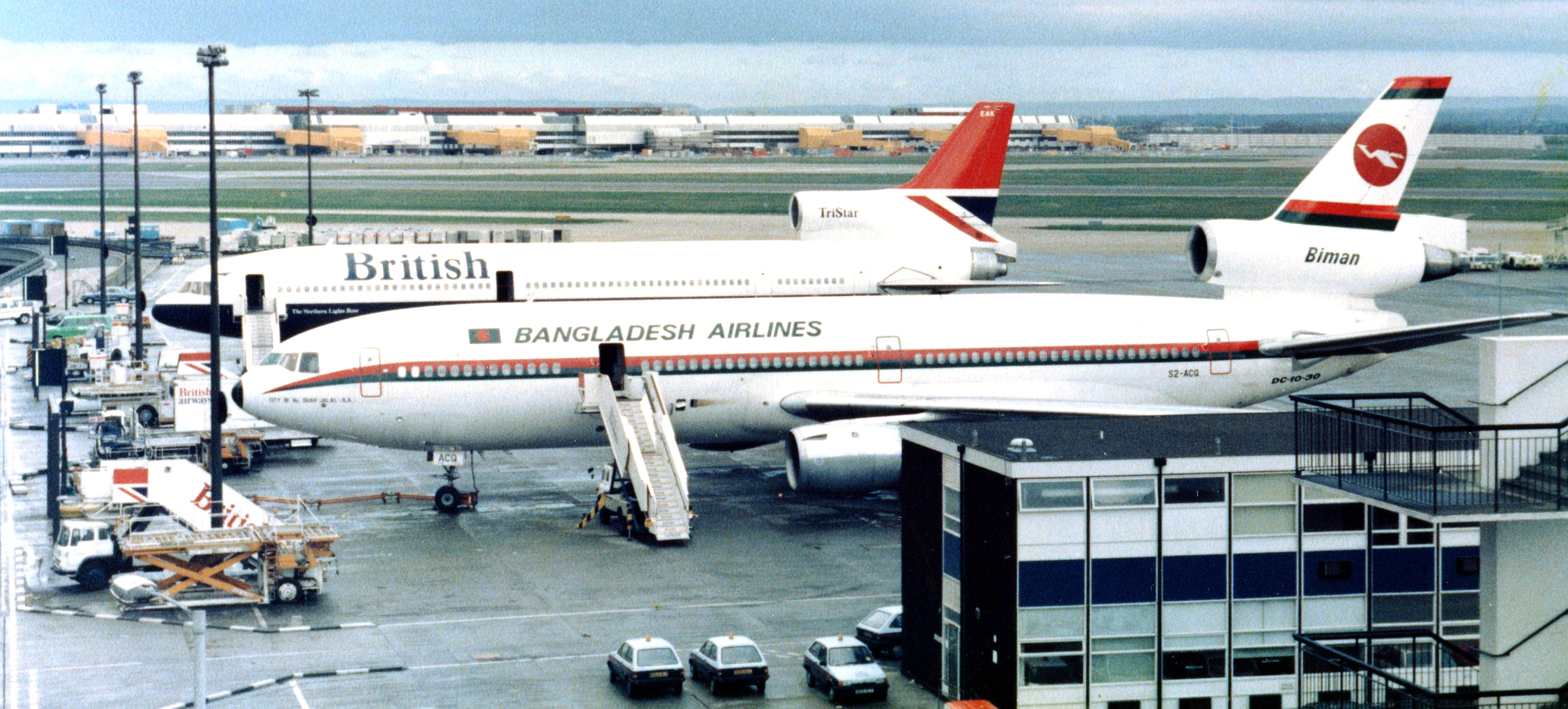
DC-10 in front and L-1011 behind it

== See also ==
Related development

- McDonnell Douglas KC-10 Extender – US aerial refueling tanker aircraft
- McDonnell Douglas MD-11 – Wide body airliner developed from the DC-10

Aircraft of comparable role, configuration, and era

- Airbus A300 – World's first twin-engine widebody jet airliner
- Boeing 747SP – Shortened version of the Boeing 747
- Ilyushin Il-86 – Soviet four-engined wide-body jet airliner
- Lockheed L-1011 TriStar – American wide-body trijet airliner

Related lists

- List of jet airliners
