= Memphis International Airport =

Airport serving Memphis, Tennessee, United States

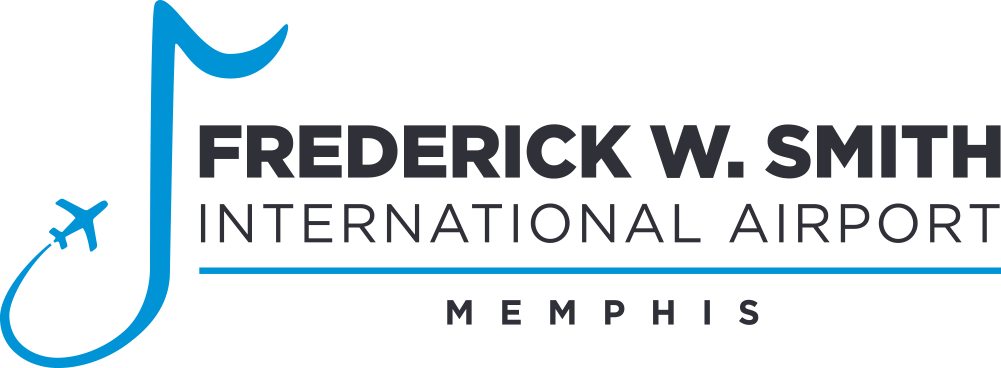

- Satellite image of the airport in 2025
- IATA: MEM; ICAO: KMEM; FAA LID: MEM; WMO: 72334

Summary
- Airport type: Public/military
- Owner/Operator: Memphis–Shelby County Airport Authority
- Serves: Memphis metropolitan area
- Location: Shelby County, Tennessee, U.S.
- Opened: 1929; 97 years ago
- Hub for: FedEx Express
- Elevation AMSL: 341 ft (104 m)
- Coordinates: 35°02′33″N 089°58′36″W
- Website: flymemphis.com

Maps
- FAA airport diagram
- Interactive map of Memphis International Airport

Runways
| Direction | Length | | Surface |
| Direction | ft | m | Surface |
|---|---|---|---|
| 18C/36C | 11,120 | 3,389 | Concrete |
| 18L/36R | 9,000 | 2,743 | Concrete |
| 18R/36L | 9,320 | 2,841 | Concrete |
| 9/27 | 8,946 | 2,727 | Concrete |

Statistics (2025)
- Passengers: 4,751,026 ▼2.62%
- Aircraft operations: 180,062
- Cargo (lb): 6,547,752,099
- Source: Memphis International Airport

Memphis International Airport (IATA: MEM, ICAO: KMEM, FAA LID: MEM), officially known as Frederick W. Smith International Airport, is a civil–military airport located seven miles (11 km; 6.1 nmi) southeast of downtown Memphis in Shelby County, Tennessee, United States. It is the primary airport serving Memphis. The airport covers 3,900 acres (1,600 ha) and has four runways.

The airport is the "superhub" for FedEx Express, with the company operating nearly 400 flights per day from Memphis, mostly at night, to destinations including the continental United States, Canada, Europe, the Middle East, Asia, and South America. The airport averages about 80 passenger flights per day. The Memphis Air National Guard Base is located at the airport and houses the 164th Airlift Wing of the Tennessee Air National Guard, which operates C-17 Globemaster III transport aircraft.

The airport opened in 1929. During World War II, it served as the base of the 4th Ferrying Group. A jet-age terminal opened in the 1960s. In 1973, Federal Express established its main hub at the airport. Memphis also served as a passenger hub from 1985 to 2013. Republic Airlines established the hub. After Republic merged with Northwest Airlines in 1986, Northwest continued to operate the hub. When Northwest subsequently merged with Delta Air Lines in 2008, it was considered redundant within Delta's network, and lost its hub status. The airport subsequently reduced its passenger facilities from three concourses to one. On August 11, 2026, the airport was renamed for Frederick W. Smith, founder of FedEx.

== History ==
Memphis mayor Watkins Overton put together a commission in 1927 to establish an airport. It was built on a 200-acre (81 ha) plot of farmland seven miles (11 km) from downtown Memphis and opened on June 14, 1929, as Memphis Municipal Airport. The two-day dedication ceremony featured aerial stunts and the arrival of over 200 aircraft. In its early years the airport had three hangars and a sod runway. Standard Oil of Louisiana built the terminal after securing the right to supply all of the airfield's oil and gasoline. In 1930, runway lights were installed after an aircraft landed in the Mississippi River because it could not find the airport at night. Robertson Aircraft Corporation, which would merge into American Airways, started passenger flights to New Orleans and St. Louis in April 1930 on Ryan monoplanes. The following June, American Airways commenced the first airmail service from Memphis. Chicago and Southern Air Lines was headquartered in the city from 1934 to 1935 and from 1941 to 1953, when it was acquired by Delta Air Lines. During the 1930s, Memphis figured on American's east–west route between New York and Los Angeles and on Chicago and Southern's north–south route linking Chicago to New Orleans. The Works Progress Administration helped construct a new terminal building, which was inaugurated in October 1938. It had three stories and an Art Deco design. That year 31,000 passengers used the airport.

After the United States entered World War II, the city government leased the airfield to the War Department in July 1942. That December the headquarters of the 4th Ferrying Group of the Army Air Forces Air Transport Command shifted to the airport. The group was tasked with sending new aircraft overseas; pilots departed Memphis for South America and then flew over the South Atlantic Ocean to Africa. Personnel such as mechanics and engineers underwent training at the base and then traveled overseas. Chicago and Southern's repair facilities at the airport were used to repair military planes. Commercial air service continued, though it was limited. The ferrying group's postwar activities included moving planes off deactivated bases. For a period in 1946, Memphis served as headquarters for the Continental Division of the Air Transport Command, which oversaw the 4th Ferrying Group and ran scheduled flights for military personnel throughout the country. The ferrying group ceased operations in March 1947. City officials reached an agreement with the federal government in January 1949 to regain control of the airfield.

Five trunk carriers flew to Memphis as of 1947, and two years later, a regional airline named Southern Airways launched operations with multi-stop service to Atlanta. The airport opened the first air-cargo terminal in the country in February 1958. The following year, passenger counts crossed one million. In August 1960, the city received its first scheduled jet flight; Delta Air Lines started using Convair 880s on its Chicago–Memphis–New Orleans route. The United States Supreme Court in Turner v. City of Memphis ordered the desegregation of the airport in 1962. Jesse Turner, an African-American banker and civil rights activist, had filed the case after he was denied service in the main dining room of the restaurant.

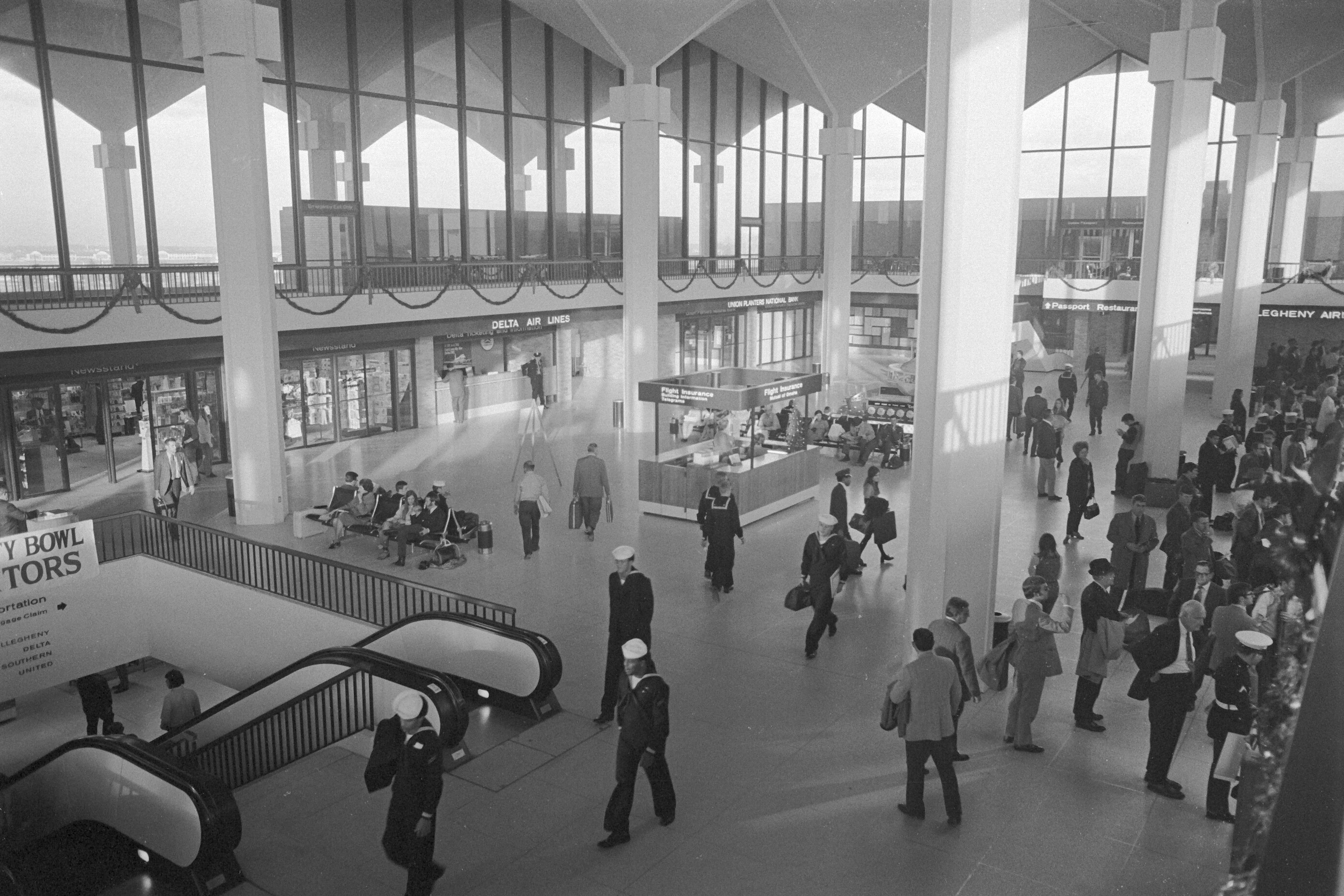
Ticket lobby in 1973

In June 1963, a new terminal built for the jet age was dedicated, and the airport was rechristened Memphis Metropolitan Airport. United Nations ambassador Adlai Stevenson II spoke at the inauguration ceremony and replaced the ribbon cutting with a rocket launch. The terminal was designed by the local firm Mann & Harrover and became Roy Harrover's most famous work. It was one of the first airport terminals to have a two-level design where passengers boarded aircraft via jet bridges on the upper level and collected their luggage on the lower level. Another unique aspect of the structure was its columns resembling martini glasses. It opened to passengers in July and was part of an expansion project that also included a control tower and a north–south runway.

In 1969, the Memphis–Shelby County Airport Authority was formed, and the facility changed its name to Memphis International Airport after being designated a customs port of origin. Expansion continued in the 1970s. A west concourse was added in 1974 and an east one the following year. The airport constructed another north–south runway, a parking garage, and a road linking the terminal to Interstate 240. The central concourse was extended as well. In 1988, the latter concourse was named B, the west one A, and the east one C.

=== Hub status ===
Air-cargo company Federal Express moved its base to Memphis from Little Rock, Arkansas, in 1973. Memphis was selected because of its temperate climate and location in the middle of the country. The decision was credited with enabling the city to go from a river port of decreasing economic relevance to an important global distribution center. Shipments flew into and out of the hub overnight on aircraft that exclusively carried cargo. To accommodate the company's rapid growth and larger aircraft, a "superhub" facility opened in 1981, featuring new methods of handling freight containers and high-speed conveyor belts operated by a computer system. Memphis became the busiest airport by cargo traffic worldwide in 1992. By 2000, the hub processed over one million packages per night, and FedEx ran 150 daily flights from Memphis.

Southern Airways developed a busy operation in Memphis. In 1979, the carrier merged with North Central Airlines to form Republic Airlines, which expanded the Memphis operation into a hub in 1985. Republic began the first international flight from Memphis to Puerto Vallarta in December 1985. The following year, the company merged into Northwest Airlines, which maintained the hub. Northwest lost money in Memphis and nearly closed the hub in 1993. The airline then worked on its local reputation and on-time record, and passenger counts began to rise.

KLM, a partner of Northwest, launched the airport's first transatlantic passenger flight to Amsterdam in June 1995. To commemorate the occasion, the airline named the McDonnell Douglas MD-11 operating the inaugural flight Elvis 1 and gave each passenger gifts, among them a small bottle of Jack Daniel's whiskey. In preparation for the flight, the airport had constructed a new customs facility. In 1997, Northwest acquired Express Airlines I, a regional carrier that operated under the Northwest Airlink brand, and shifted its headquarters to Memphis. The airport served 11.8 million travelers in 2000.

The Memphis–Shelby County Airport Authority expanded the facilities. The passenger terminal was enlarged five times between 1986 and 1999. Northwest and the airport authority worked together on the fifth project. They added 15 gates to Concourse A for Express I's new 50-seat Bombardier CRJs. Other upgrades included a post-security corridor linking Concourses B and C, a new lounge, and faster ticket counters. A third parallel runway opened in 1997. Three years later, the middle runway was rebuilt and lengthened to 11,120 feet (3,390 m). Dubbed the World Runway, it enabled KLM to take off from Memphis with a full cabin in hot conditions and FedEx to carry more cargo.

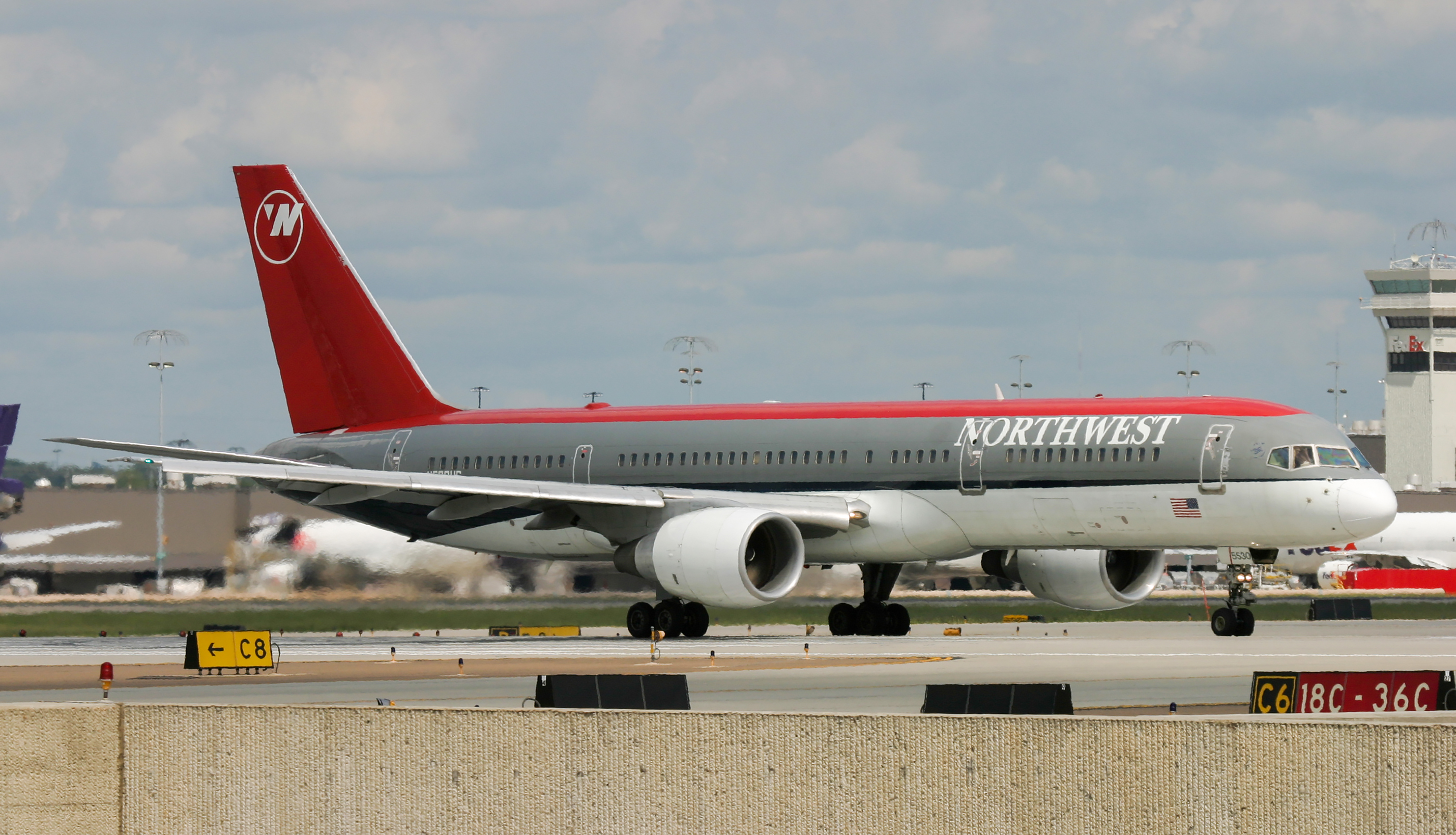
A Northwest Airlines Boeing 757 taxiing in 2006

Memphis was the smallest of Northwest Airlines' three domestic hubs. The carrier utilized all the gates in Concourse B, as well as some in A and C. As of 2004, it operated about 210 daily flights to more than 80 destinations. The airport had mainline flights to cities such as Boston and San Francisco. Northwest Airlink flew to communities within Tennessee and across the South, like Baton Rouge and Chattanooga. The hub had international service to three countries in North America and one in Europe. Northwest offered a daily flight to Amsterdam; it had replaced KLM on the route in 2003. Other destinations included Montego Bay and Toronto. The hub's shortest flight was the one to Tupelo, Mississippi, on Saab 340 turboprops, while the longest was the DC-10 service to Amsterdam.

Northwest was acquired by Delta Air Lines in 2008. Delta maintained Memphis as a hub, offering 240 flights per day in 2009. However, due to high fuel costs, the company made Memphis subordinate to its hub in Atlanta. The airport's role changed to handling traffic that exceeded Atlanta's capacity, and flights were gradually scaled back. Delta discontinued the Amsterdam link in September 2012; as the hub shrank, so did the amount of connecting traffic that supported the flight. The following year, Pinnacle Airlines Corp. moved its headquarters out of the city. The holding company owned Pinnacle Airlines, formerly known as Express Airlines I. Delta closed the hub in September 2013, decreasing the number of daily departures from 94 to 60. The carrier attributed its decision to limited local demand and the inefficiency of 50-seat regional jets. The southern portion of Concourse A with its gates for CRJs was closed. Another factor was the proximity of Memphis to Atlanta.

=== 2010s onwards ===
The closure of the Delta hub resulted in several changes at the Memphis airport. Passenger traffic declined from eleven million in 2007 to four million in 2017. The terminal, with its three concourses and unoccupied gates, was too large. In 2014, the Memphis–Shelby County Airport Authority announced a renovation of the airport that would involve modernizing Concourse B and mothballing the other two concourses. On the other hand, airfares dropped and new low-cost airlines entered the market, such as Southwest Airlines. The airport continued to see a high level of cargo activity due to the FedEx hub. As of 2018, Memphis was the second-busiest cargo airport in the world.

The refurbishment of Concourse B was completed in February 2022. The building features wider hallways and higher ceilings. The southwest wing of the concourse was not renovated because of cost and a lack of need for the additional gates. Work commenced on an expansion of the landside portion of the terminal in 2024. The program includes tearing down Concourse A to make room for an administrative and baggage-inspection building. Following the death of Frederick W. Smith, founder of FedEx, in June 2025, the airport authority decided to rename the facility in his honor due to his contributions to the city of Memphis and the airport in particular. The Federal Aviation Administration was working on implementing the change as of December 2025. On August 11, 2026, the airport was officially renamed to Frederick W. Smith International Airport.

== Facilities ==
=== Airfield ===
The Memphis airport occupies 3,900 acres (1,600 ha) and has four concrete runways. There is one east–west runway, 9/27, and three parallel north–south runways designated 18C/36C, 18L/36R, and 18R/36L. 18C/36C is the longest at 11,120 feet (3,390 m). The air traffic control tower was erected in 2011 and measures 336 feet (102 m). In 2022, the airport opened a new consolidated de-icing facility, which has a dedicated control tower and capacity for 12 wide-body planes.

=== Terminal ===
Memphis International Airport has one terminal with a Y-shaped concourse. There are 23 gates on the central stem and southeastern leg of the concourse. All international flights that are not precleared at the departure airport are processed on the southwestern leg. The terminal was built in 1963, and by the 1970s it had three concourses. The west concourse was labeled A, the middle one B, and the east one C. As of 2013, the year that the Delta hub closed, the terminal had over 70 gates. When the refurbished Concourse B began operations in 2022, all flights were consolidated there and the other two concourses closed. The demolition of Concourse A started in 2025.

=== Cargo ===
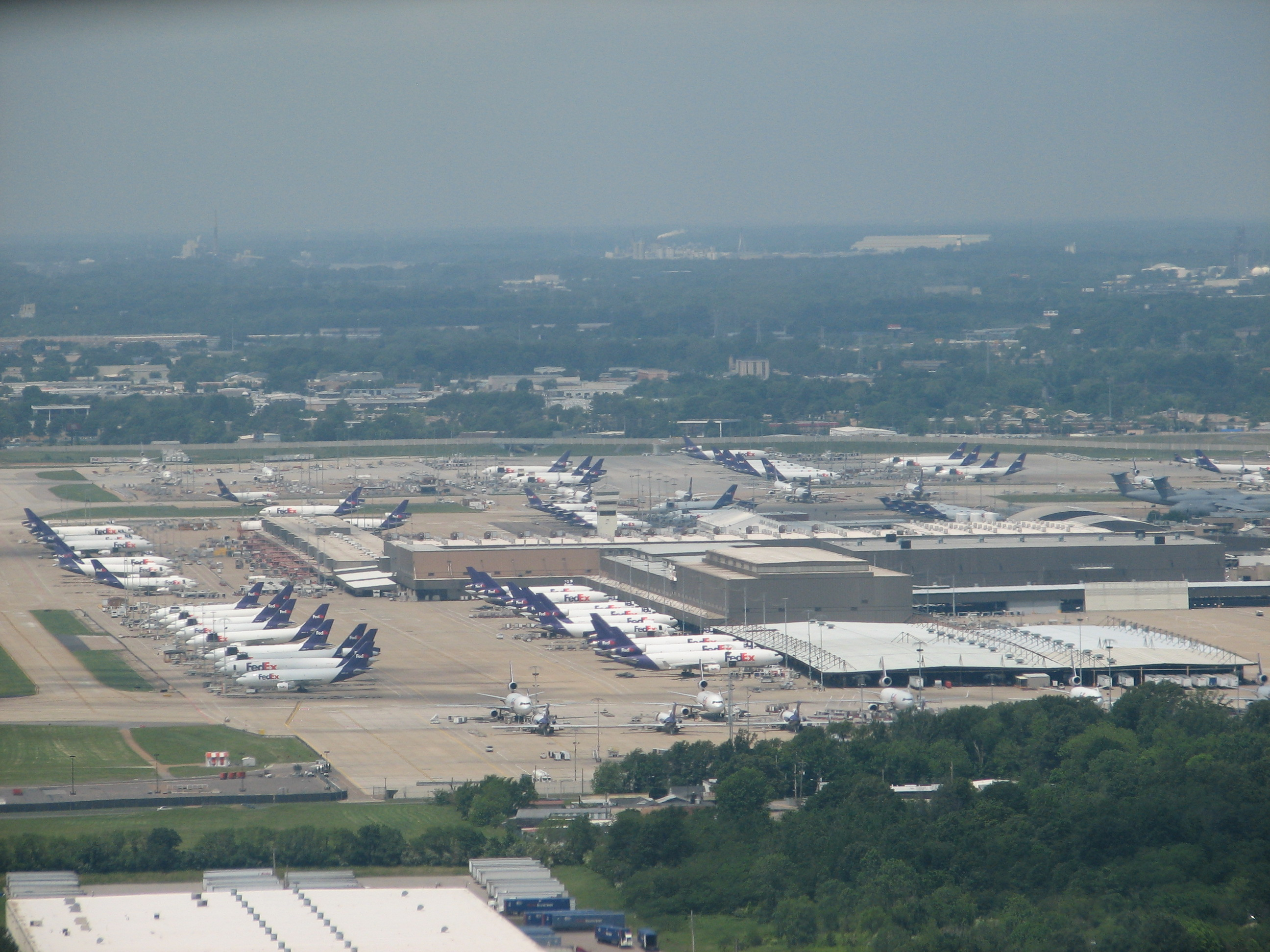
FedEx Superhub in 2008

FedEx Express maintains its world hub at the Memphis airport. The company refers to Memphis as its "Superhub". Launched in 1973, the hub has sorting facilities, a cold-storage building, and a command center. A separate control tower manages traffic to and from the ramp. The hub is capable of sorting 484,000 shipments per hour and serves 250 daily flights, most of which operate between 10 p.m. and 5 a.m. FedEx contributes the most toward the airport's operating costs, excluding those related to the passenger terminal. In addition, United Parcel Service has had a regional hub at the airport since 1999.

=== Ground transportation ===
The passenger terminal can be accessed from Interstate 240 via Plough Boulevard and Jim McGehee Parkway. It can also be reached via Winchester Road. The airport is served by the Memphis Area Transit Authority route 28 bus, which offers service to Hudson Transit Center in downtown Memphis, as well as Airways Transit Center. The Ground Transportation Center, completed in March 2013, contains the airport's economy parking and parking for all car rental companies. It is seven stories tall and features 4,500 economy parking spaces and 1,200 rental car spaces.

== Airlines and destinations ==
=== Passenger ===
| Airlines | Destinations |
|---|---|
| Allegiant Air | Fort Lauderdale, Knoxville, Las Vegas, Orlando/Sanford, St. Petersburg/Clearwater; Seasonal: Destin/Fort Walton Beach |
| American Airlines | Charlotte, Dallas/Fort Worth, Miami, Phoenix–Sky Harbor; Seasonal: Chicago–O'Hare |
| American Eagle | Charlotte, Chicago–O'Hare, Dallas/Fort Worth, New York–LaGuardia, Philadelphia, Phoenix–Sky Harbor, Washington–National |
| Breeze Airways | Pensacola, Raleigh/Durham, San Antonio, Tampa |
| Delta Air Lines | Atlanta, Detroit, Los Angeles, Salt Lake City; Seasonal: Minneapolis/St. Paul |
| Delta Connection | Boston, Detroit, Minneapolis/St. Paul, New York–LaGuardia |
| Frontier Airlines | Denver, Orlando |
| Southern Airways Express | Harrison/Branson, Hot Springs |
| Southwest Airlines | Austin, Baltimore, Chicago–Midway, Dallas–Love, Denver, Houston–Hobby, Las Vegas, Nashville, Orlando, Phoenix–Sky Harbor; Seasonal: Tampa |
| United Airlines | Chicago–O'Hare, Denver, Houston–Intercontinental |
| United Express | Chicago–O'Hare, Houston–Intercontinental, Newark |

=== Cargo ===
| Airlines | Destinations | Refs |
|---|---|---|
| FedEx Express | Aguadilla, Albany (NY), Albuquerque, Allentown, Anchorage, Appleton, Atlanta, Austin, Baltimore, Birmingham (AL), Bloomington, Boise, Boston, Buffalo, Burbank, Burlington, Calgary, Campinas, Casper, Cedar Rapids/Iowa City, Charleston (SC), Charlotte, Chattanooga, Chicago–O'Hare, Cincinnati, Cleveland, Cologne/Bonn, Colorado Springs, Columbia (SC), Columbus–Rickenbacker, Dallas/Fort Worth, Dayton, Denver, Des Moines, Detroit, Dubai–International, Edmonton, El Paso, Fargo, Flint, Fort Lauderdale, Fort Myers, Fort Wayne, Fort Worth/Alliance, Frankfurt, Fresno, Grand Junction, Grand Rapids, Great Falls, Greensboro (NC), Greenville/Spartanburg, Guadalajara, Harlingen, Harrisburg, Hartford, Ho Chi Minh City, Hong Kong, Honolulu, Houston–Intercontinental, Huntington (WV), Indianapolis, Jacksonville (FL), Kansas City, Knoxville, Lafayette, Laredo, Las Vegas, Liège, London–Stansted, Los Angeles, Louisville, Lubbock, Madison, Manchester (NH), Mexico City–AIFA, Miami, Milan–Malpensa, Milwaukee, Minneapolis/St. Paul, Mobile–International, Monterrey, Montréal–Mirabel, Nashville, New Orleans, New York–JFK, Newark, Newburgh, Norfolk, Oakland, Oklahoma City, Omaha, Ontario, Orange County, Orlando, Osaka–Kansai, Ottawa, Panama City–Tocumen, Paris–Charles de Gaulle, Philadelphia, Phoenix–Sky Harbor, Pittsburgh, Portland (ME), Portland (OR), Providence, Querétaro, Quito, Raleigh/Durham, Reno/Tahoe, Richmond, Roanoke, Rochester (MN), Rochester (NY), Sacramento, Salt Lake City, San Antonio, San Bernardino, San Diego, San Francisco, San Jose (CA), San José (CR), San Juan, Santo Domingo–Las Américas, Savannah, Seattle/Tacoma, Seoul–Incheon, Shanghai–Pudong, Shreveport, Sioux Falls, South Bend, Spokane, Springfield/Branson, St. Louis, Syracuse, Tallahassee, Tampa, Tokyo–Narita, Toluca/Mexico City, Toronto–Pearson, Tucson, Tulsa, Vancouver, Washington–Dulles, West Palm Beach, Wichita, Winnipeg | |
| FedEx Feeder | Atlanta, Birmingham (AL), Charleston (SC), Columbus (GA), Dothan, Evansville, Huntsville, Monroe, Tallahassee, Thief River Falls | |
| UPS Airlines | Chicago/Rockford, Louisville | |

== Statistics ==
From 1992 to 2009, Memphis International was the world's busiest airport for cargo operations. It dropped to second place in 2010, just behind Hong Kong. It still remained the busiest cargo airport in the United States and the Western Hemisphere. It briefly rose to first place once again in 2020, due to the surge in e-commerce partly caused by the COVID-19 pandemic, but dropped back to second place in 2021.

=== Annual traffic and cargo ===
MEM Airport annual traffic and cargo data, 2006–present
| Year | Passengers | Total cargo (lb) | Year | Passengers | Total cargo (lb) |
|---|---|---|---|---|---|
| 2006 | 11,149,775 | 8,141,305,181 | 2016 | 4,001,017 | 9,530,165,389 |
| 2007 | 11,258,682 | 8,468,558,790 | 2017 | 4,196,259 | 9,562,537,748 |
| 2008 | 10,925,622 | 8,148,705,319 | 2018 | 4,419,541 | 9,856,782,840 |
| 2009 | 10,229,627 | 8,152,267,352 | 2019 | 4,644,490 | 9,531,640,512 |
| 2010 | 10,003,186 | 8,636,848,399 | 2020 | 2,029,836 | 10,172,615,629 |
| 2011 | 8,737,641 | 8,635,964,038 | 2021 | 3,590,638 | 9,879,426,206 |
| 2012 | 6,753,186 | 8,855,559,128 | 2022 | 4,355,206 | 8,908,773,342 |
| 2013 | 4,598,186 | 9,124,147,586 | 2023 | 4,796,717 | 8,558,070,310 |
| 2014 | 3,597,601 | 9,390,059,997 | 2024 | 4,878,919 | 8,278,089,669 |
| 2015 | 3,758,450 | 9,460,855,765 | 2025 | 4,751,026 | 6,547,752,099 |

=== Top destinations ===
Busiest domestic routes from MEM (June 2025 – May 2026)
| Rank | City | Passengers | Carriers |
|---|---|---|---|
| 1 | Atlanta, Georgia | 389,550 | Delta |
| 2 | Dallas/Fort Worth, Texas | 231,760 | American |
| 3 | Charlotte, North Carolina | 176,450 | American |
| 4 | Chicago–O'Hare, Illinois | 155,900 | American, United |
| 5 | Denver, Colorado | 149,690 | Frontier, Southwest, United |
| 6 | Houston–Intercontinental, Texas | 111,840 | United |
| 7 | Orlando, Florida | 94,010 | Frontier, Southwest |
| 8 | New York–LaGuardia, New York | 84,950 | American, Delta |
| 9 | Houston–Hobby, Texas | 82,240 | Southwest |
| 10 | Las Vegas, Nevada | 76,980 | Allegiant, Southwest |

=== Airline market share ===
Largest airlines at MEM (June 2025 – May 2026)
| Rank | Airline | Passengers | Share |
|---|---|---|---|
| 1 | Delta Air Lines | 960,000 | 20.72% |
| 2 | Southwest Airlines | 880,000 | 18.98% |
| 3 | American Airlines | 836,000 | 18.05% |
| 4 | SkyWest Airlines | 394,000 | 8.51% |
| 5 | Republic Airways | 310,000 | 6.69% |
| 6 | Other | 1,253,000 | 27.04% |

== Air National Guard ==
The Memphis Air National Guard Base, home to the 164th Airlift Wing, sits on the airport grounds. It was established in 1946. The base was initially situated on the north side of the airport and was adjacent to the FedEx hub. In 2008, a new facility was constructed on the southeast side to handle the Lockheed C-5 Galaxy and provide FedEx more space. The guard unit began flying the Boeing C-17 Globemaster III in 2013.

== Accidents and incidents ==
- On August 12, 1944, a USAAF Douglas C-47 caught fire after takeoff after one of the propeller blades cut through the fuselage, causing a fire on the runway. All except the captain got out safely.
- On December 17, 1944, a USAAF Douglas C-47 drifted to the right after takeoff, stalled and hit a brick storehouse. Three out of the six on board died.
- On January 13, 1963, a Delta Air Lines Douglas DC-7 struck a USAF Fairchild C-123 Provider taxiing at night. The pilot of the DC-7 was killed, and the Provider was destroyed after catching fire.
- On May 18, 1978, a Dassault Falcon 20 C operated by Flight Safety International collided with a Cessna 150 3.8 miles west of MEM, all four occupants on the Falcon and two aboard the Cessna died as both aircraft crashed.
- On August 11, 1984, Douglas C-47 N70003 of Aviation Enterprises crashed shortly after takeoff from Memphis International Airport on a domestic nonscheduled passenger flight to O'Hare International Airport, Chicago. All three people on board died. A missing spark plug on the port engine caused a loss of power. Maintenance involving the removal of the spark plugs had been performed the previous day.
- On October 8, 1987, a Volpar Turboliner II operated by Connie Kalitta Services crashed while attempting to return to MEM due to an attached tail stand. The aircraft was overweight and the cg (Center of Gravity) was three inches forward of the limit. The sole occupant died.
- On April 7, 1994, Federal Express Flight 705 bound for San Jose, California, experienced an attempted hijacking shortly after takeoff. FedEx employee Auburn Calloway tried to hijack the plane in order to crash it into the FedEx hub at Memphis International, in a Kamikaze-style attack. The crew—although seriously injured—fought him off and returned to Memphis, where police and emergency crews subdued him.
- On October 15, 2002, a Northwest Airlines Avro RJ 85 collided with the jetway at gate C2 while taxiing for a maintenance check. The mechanics were unable to slow the aircraft down in time. The collision caused extensive damage to the wing of the aircraft, with the number one engine being ripped almost entirely off. The aircraft was eventually torn apart and set in a field near the airport.
- On December 18, 2003, FedEx Express Flight 647 veered off the runway after the landing gear collapsed upon landing. The flight had departed Oakland International Airport (OAK) earlier that day. The aircraft was immediately engulfed in flames. All five crew members escaped by exiting via the cockpit window.
- On July 28, 2006, FedEx Flight 630's landing gear collapsed upon landing at Memphis International Airport after a flight from Seattle–Tacoma International Airport. After coming to a stop, the plane caught fire, engulfing the left wing and engine. While the three crew members sustained injuries, they all survived. The aircraft was written off.
