= FedEx Express Flight 630 =

2006 aviation accident in Tennessee

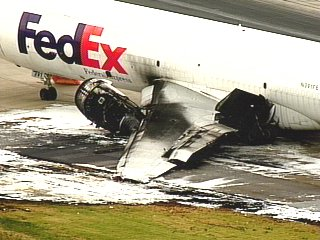
- The damage to the aircraft

Accident
- Date: July 28, 2006
- Summary: Landing gear failure on landing due to metal fatigue leading to runway excursion and fire
- Site: Memphis International Airport, Memphis, Tennessee, United States

Aircraft
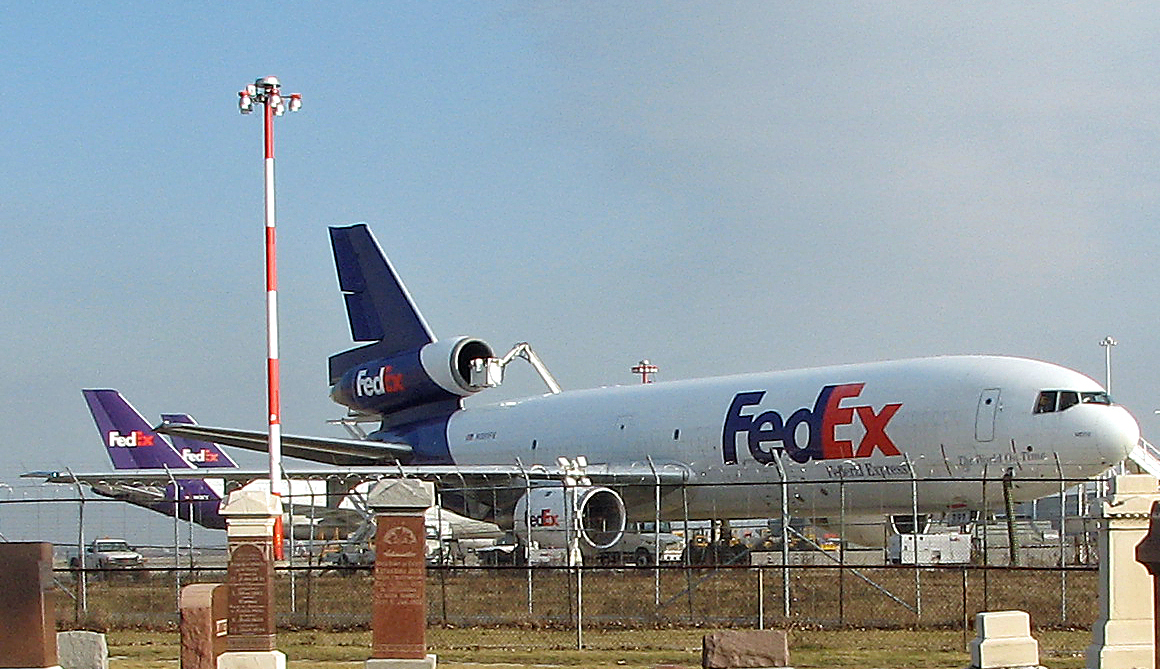
- N391FE, the aircraft involved in the accident, seen in January 2006
- Aircraft type: McDonnell Douglas DC-10-10F
- Aircraft name: Chandra
- Operator: FedEx Express
- Call sign: FEDEX 630
- Registration: N391FE
- Flight origin: Seattle-Tacoma International Airport
- Destination: Memphis International Airport, Memphis, Tennessee
- Occupants: 3
- Passengers: 1
- Crew: 2
- Fatalities: 0
- Injuries: 3
- Survivors: 3

FedEx Express Flight 630 was a regular scheduled cargo flight from Seattle-Tacoma International Airport to Memphis International Airport, Memphis, Tennessee. On July 28, 2006, the McDonnell Douglas MD-10-10F operating the flight, crashed upon landing due to a landing gear failure. The main left undercarriage collapsed seven seconds after touchdown causing the MD-10 to roll off the runway out of control. The aircraft finally came to a stop near taxiway M4 and caught fire. The fire consumed the wing and port engine and the crash and evacuation left everyone onboard injured.

== Background ==
=== Aircraft ===
The aircraft involved was a 32-year old McDonnell Douglas MD-10-10F, registration N391FE manufactured in 1974.

=== Crew ===
In command was 57-year-old Captain Jayne C. Akin, who had been working for FedEx Express since 1979. She had 16,000 flight hours, including 4,223 hours on the MD-10/11. The first officer was 38-year-old Andrew D. Macha, who had been with the airline since 2004 and had 5,000 flight hours, with 300-350 of them on the MD-10/11. Macha previously served for the U.S. Air Force from 1991 to 2004.

== Accident ==
FedEx Flight 630 was a regular scheduled cargo flight from Seattle-Tacoma International Airport to Memphis International Airport, Memphis, Tennessee, which was operated by the company's 82 McDonnell Douglas MD-10F aircraft. On 28 July, N391FE was conducting a visual approach to runway 18R which was initially flown with the autopilot engaged and coupled to the ILS. The first officer was the pilot flying for the landing. At 1600 feet the airplane was configured for a landing. At 400 feet the autopilot was disconnected, the final approach segment was smooth. Upon touchdown, the left main gear collapsed without warning, causing the left wing to contact the runway, with the jet veering violently to the left and eventually coming to a stop near taxiway M4.

== Investigation ==
The NTSB launched an investigation into the crash of the flight. The final report, released in 2008, cited a fatigue crack in the air filler valve hole caused by inadequate maintenance on the aircraft.
