= Fuse (hydraulic) =

Mechanical blockage used to prevent loss of working fluid in an emergency

In hydraulic systems, a fuse (or velocity fuse) is a component which prevents the sudden loss of hydraulic fluid pressure. It is a safety feature, designed to allow systems to continue operating, or at least to not fail catastrophically, in the event of a system breach. It does this by stopping or greatly restricting the flow of hydraulic fluid through the fuse if the flow exceeds a threshold.

The term "fuse" is used here in analogy with electrical fuses which perform a similar function.

Hydraulic systems rely on high pressures (usually over 7,000 kPa or 1,000 psi) to work properly. If a hydraulic system loses fluid pressure, such as due to a burst hydraulic hose, it will become inoperative and components such as actuators may collapse. This is an undesirable condition in life-critical systems such as aircraft or heavy machinery, such as forklifts. Hydraulic fuses help guard against catastrophic failure of a hydraulic system by automatically isolating the defective branch.

When a hydraulic system is damaged, there is generally a rapid flow of hydraulic fluid towards the breach. Most hydraulic fuses detect this flow and seal themselves (or restrict flow) if the flow exceeds a predetermined limit. There are many different fuse designs but most involve a passive spring-controlled mechanism which closes when the pressure differential across the fuse becomes excessive.

Many gas station pumps are equipped with a velocity fuse to limit gasoline flow. The fuse can be heard to engage with a "click" on some pumps if the nozzle trigger is depressed fully. A slight reduction in fuel flow can be observed. The fuse resets instantly upon releasing the trigger.

== Types ==
There are two types of hydraulic fuses. The first one acts like a pressure relief valve, venting in case of a pressure surge. The second is like a check valve. The only difference is a check valve is in place to prevent upstream fluid from coming back and venting out. A fuse is in place before the venting area and stops fluid from venting forward of it.

Hydraulic fuses are not a perfect solution to fluid loss. They are ineffective against slow, seeping loss of hydraulic fluid, and they may be unable to prevent fluid loss in the event of a catastrophic system failure involving multiple breaches to hydraulic lines. Also, when a fuse activates it is likely that the system will no longer function as designed, as hydraulically actuated devices may be present in the section isolated by the fuse.

Depending on the system, hydraulic fuses may reset automatically after a delay, or may require manual re-opening. Forklift main hoist cylinders are usually equipped with a fuse built into the hose adapter at the base of the cylinder that resets immediately upon stopping the flow.

== In dam spillways ==
In the design of a spillway for a dam, a fuse plug is a water retaining structure designed to wash out in a controlled fashion if the main dam is in danger of overtopping due to flood, and if the normal spillway channel is insufficient to control the overtopping.

== See also ==
- Relief valve
- Safety valve
