= Naval Mobile Construction Battalion 5 =

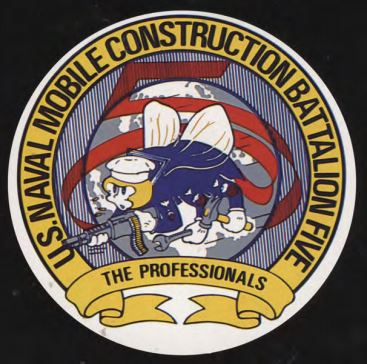
- NMCB 5 1984 insignia
- Active: 15 May 1942 – 1945; 10 July 1951 - present
- Country: United States
- Branch: USN
- Part of: 30th Naval Construction Regiment
- Homeport: CBC Port Hueneme, Ca.
- Nickname: "The Professionals"
- Mottos: Pride and Professionalism
- Engagements: World War II; Vietnam War; Gulf War; Operation Iraqi Freedom

Commanders
- Current commander: CDR Christian J. Auger

Naval Construction Battalion 5 was commissioned on May 25, 1942 at Camp Allen Va. The battalion went to Port Hueneme and shipped out for the first of two deployments in the Pacific. When the war ended CB 5 was decommissioned in the Philippines. On July 10, 1951 the Battalion was re-commissioned as a MCB and remains an active unit today.

WWII Unit Insignia

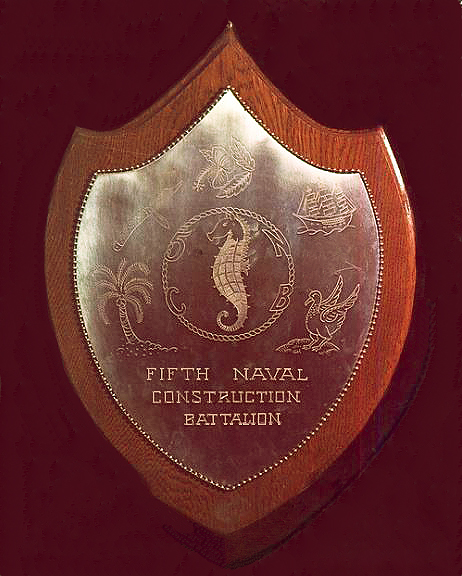
5th CB WWII insignia

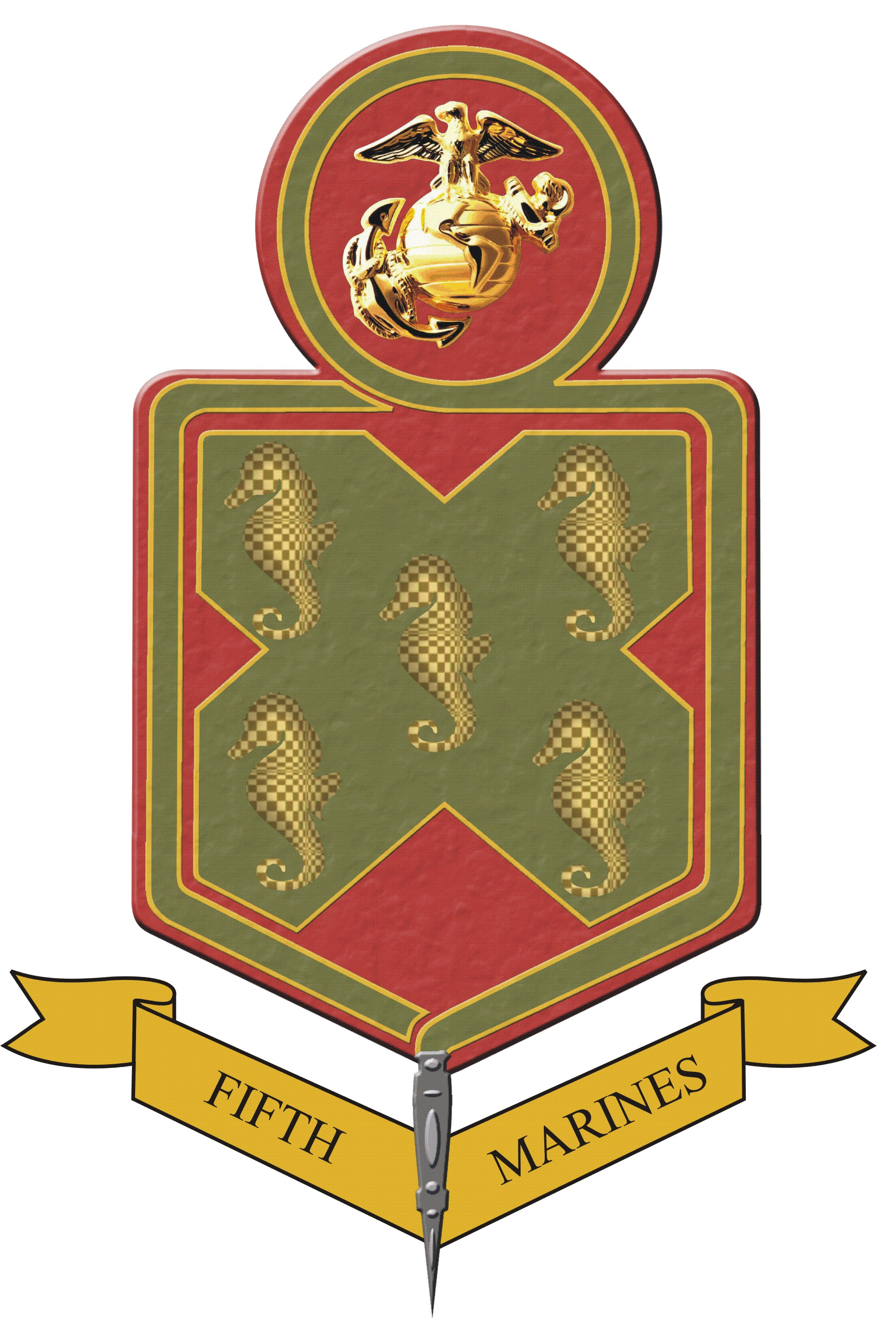
5th Marine Regiment insignia

CB 5 adopted the Seahorse of the 5th Marines
Battalion insignia since recommissioning

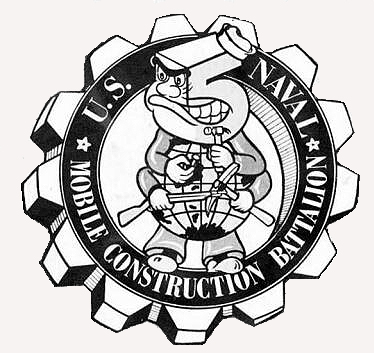
5th MCB 1951 insignia

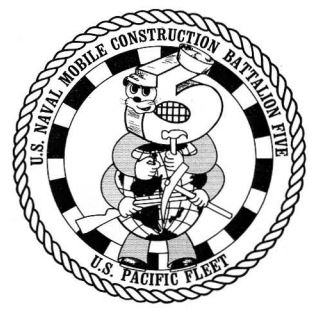
later MCB 5 insignia

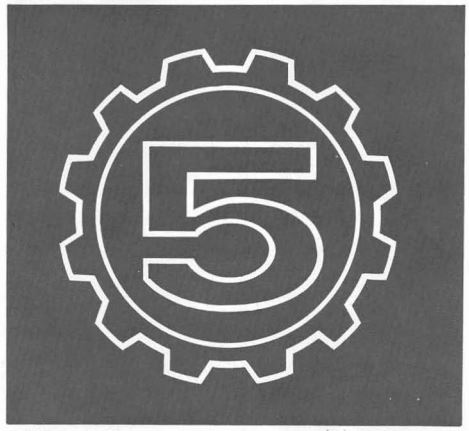
NMCB 5 1970 insignia

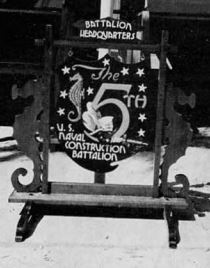
5th CB WWII HQ sign. (Seabee Museum)

Midway Atoll airfields. Runway in black remains in use today the ones in gray have been abandoned.

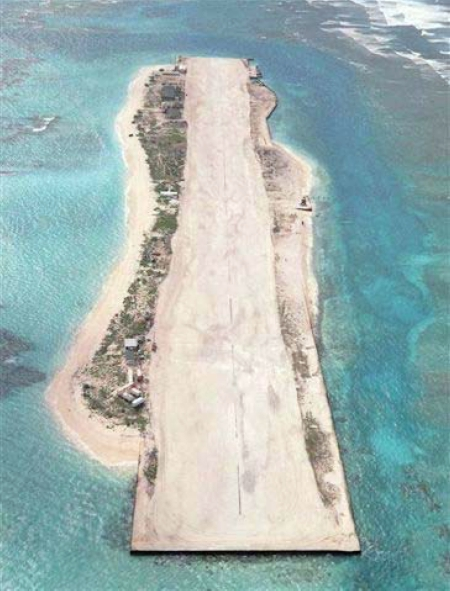
French Frigate Shoals 3,100' x 275' runway was created by NCB 5.

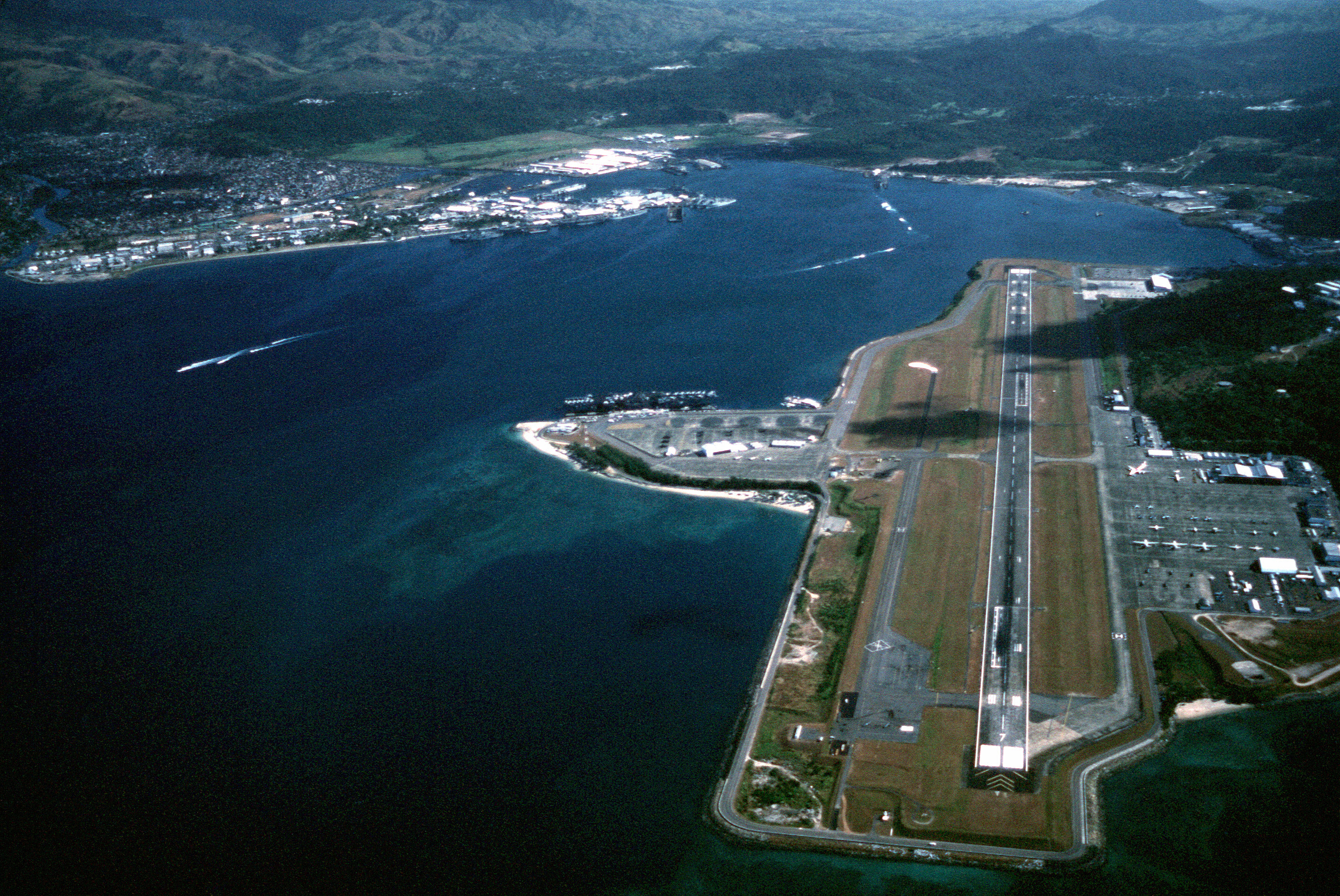
NAS Cubi Point, MCB 5 Seabees helped leveled a mountain that civilian contractors said could not be done. Note the Aircraft-carrier docked adjacent the field. (USN)

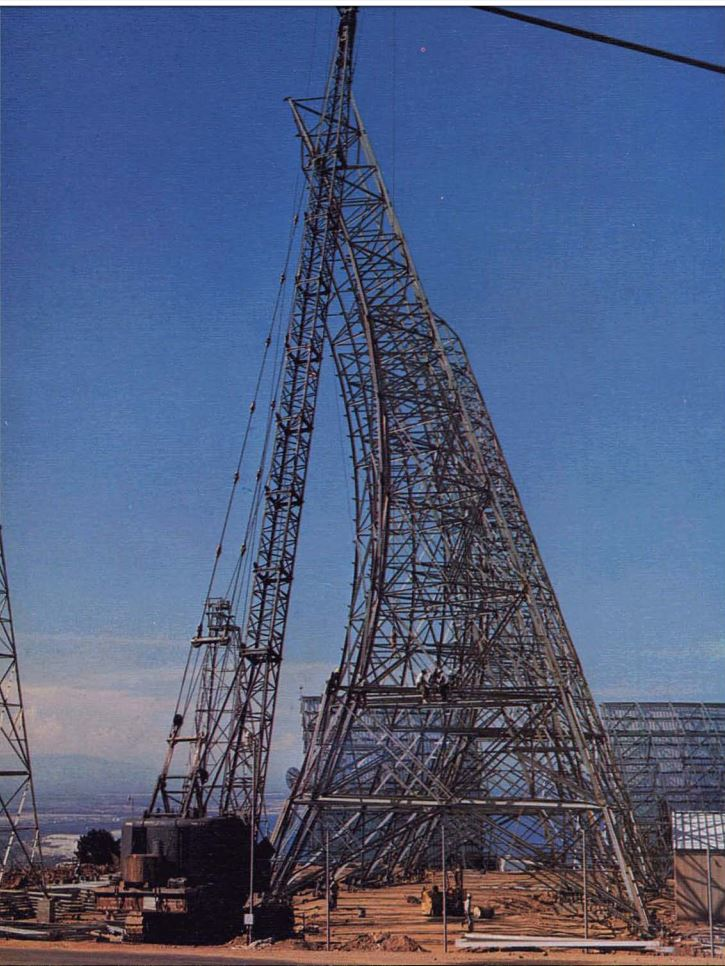
MCB 5 constructing an Integrated Wideband Communication System Antenna on Monkey Mountain during the 1966-67 Vietnam deployment. (Seabee Museum)

== History ==
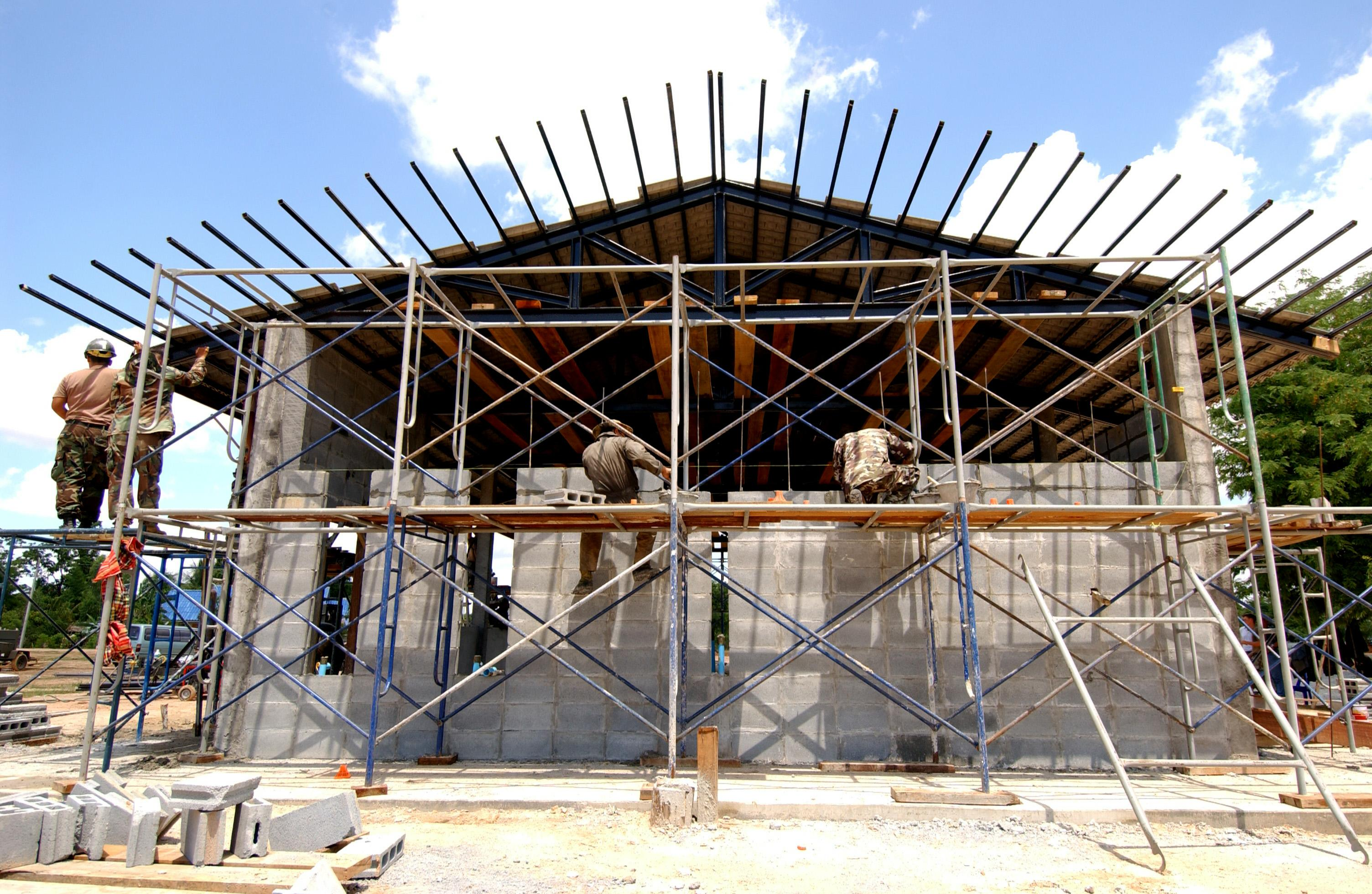
US Navy 040510-F-5855M-061 Seabees assigned to Naval Mobile Construction Battalion Five (NMCB-5) and Thailand Army soldiers work together to build a community center in Ban Poon Suk, Thailand in 2004

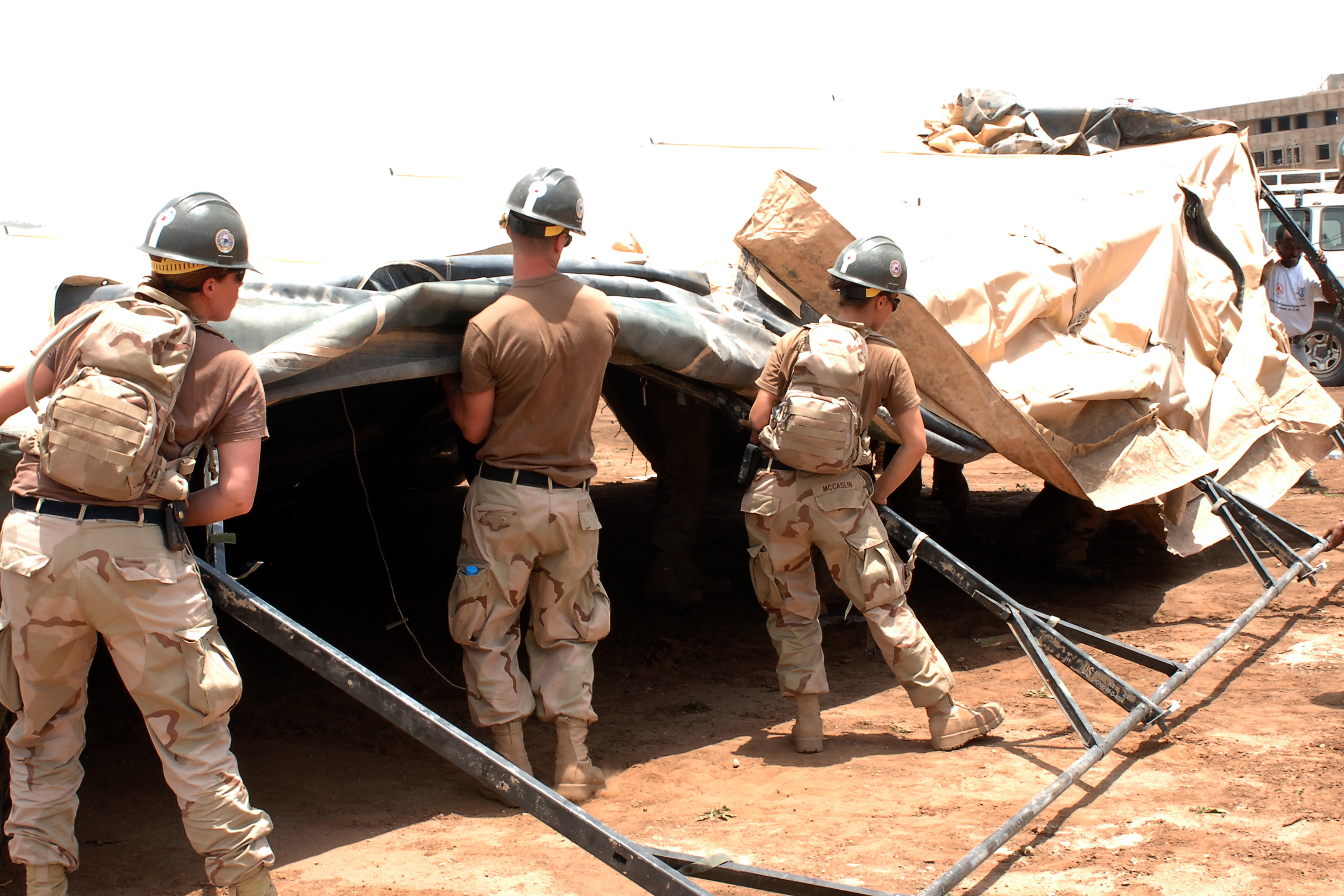
US Navy 060821-N-7770P-002 A team of U.S. Navy Seabees from NMCB 5, attached to Combined Joint Task Force Horn of Africa (CJTF HOA), set up tents in 2006

=== WWII ===
With pressing construction needs in the Pacific, Naval Construction Battalion 5 was "rushed" in its formation. With its ranks full of qualified tradesmen the battalion was quickly given its military indoctrination and processed in less than a month for transit to Port Hueneme, Ca. From there the battalion boarded ship and was the first CB into the Hawaiian Territory. "NAS Honolulu" was actually Naval Air Station Barbers Point and it was on CB 5's work list. Also on the list was Midway Atoll. Sand Island had another airfield in need of attention. Rounding out the first deployment were projects on French Frigate Shoals, Canton Island, Johnston Atoll and Palmyra atoll. At French Frigate shoals an island had to be made for the base and airfield to be constructed upon. CB 5 was rotated CONUS on 19 March 1944, arriving Camp Parks, Ca on March 24. Five's Midway replacement was the 50th CB who arrived on April 4. From Camp Parks the battalion was transferred to Port Hueneme. While there the battalion was given its next assignment and attached to Cub-16. That was canceled with the battalion attached to the 7th Fleet and General MacArthur. On January 10, 1945 CB 5 departed Port Hueneme for Leyte where it arrived February 15. Nine days later the battalion would land at it new job site on Calicoan, Samar. The main projects would be an ABCD, ACEPD, NSD and roads and water supply for all of it. At Calicoan CB 5 had divers doing shallow water work for a seaplane ramp. There were several detachments, one to both Advance Base Unit 10(NABU-10) and NABU-12. Able Company went to Balikpapan, Borneo to help the Aussies joining Detachments from the 111th and 113th CBs. On 13 August the battalion learned it was assigned Operation Olympic the first element of Operation Downfall. Downfall was the plan for the invasion of Japan. Set to begin in November 1945, Operation Olympic was intended to capture the southern third of the Japanese island of Kyūshū. This was to be followed by Operation Coronet, the second element, which was planned to land near Tokyo. VJ-day terminated these Operations leaving NCB 5 in the Philippines. CB 5 was then listed to be tasked to the Operation Beleaguer mission in China, but received notice mid-October that was canceled too. Naval Construction Battalion 5 was deactivated on December 3, 1945.

=== Korea ===
On July 15, 1951, CB 5 was reactivated as a MCB. The Korean War had begun and the Navy realized it had a need for an air station in the region. Cubi Point in the Philippines was selected, and civilian contractors were initially approached for the project. After seeing the Zambales Mountains and the surrounding jungle, they claimed it could not be done. The Navy then turned to the Seabees and was told no problem, Can do. The first Bees to arrive were surveyors of CBD 1802. MCB 3 arrived on 2 October 1951 to get the project going and was joined by MCB 5 in November. Over the next five years, MCBs 2, 7, 9, 11 and CBD 1803 also contributed to the effort. They leveled a mountain to make way for a nearly 2-mile-long (3.2 km) runway. NAS Cubi Point turned out to be one of the largest earth-moving projects in the world, equivalent to the construction of the Panama Canal. Seabees there moved 20 million cubic yards (15 million cubic metres) of dry fill plus another 15 million that was hydraulic fill. The $100 million facility was commissioned on 25 July 1956, and comprised an air station with an adjacent pier capable of docking the Navy's largest carriers. Adjusted-for-inflation, today's price-tag for what the Seabees built at Cubi Point would be $906,871,323.53. The Philippine government did not renew the base's lease with the United States in 1992. The airfield now Subic Bay International Airport.

=== Vietnam ===
From 1965 to 1972, NMCB FIVE made six consecutive deployments to Vietnam.

- September 1965 - May 1966, Danang ~ Camp Hoover
- October 1966 - June 1967, East Danang ~ Camp Adenir, assigned to III Marine Amphibious Corps
- November 1967 - July 1968, Camp Barnes Dong Ha Combat Base, assigned to III Marine Amphibious Corps
- January - October 1969, Danang ~ Camp Hoover
- January - October 1970, North Danang ~ Camp Haskins, During this deployment the battalion was visited by many flag officers some of whom visited multiple Detachments multiple times.
  - VADM E.R Zumwalt Jr., Chief of Naval Operations
  - VADM J.H. King Jr., Commander U.S. Naval Force Vietnam
  - RADM J. G. Dillon, Commander 3rd Naval Construction Brigade
  - RADM A.R. Marschall, Commander 3rd Naval Construction Brigade
  - RADM Combs COMSERPAC
  - RADN Bonner NAVSUPPAC Danang
  - RADM W.H.Heman COMCBPAC
  - RADM Adamson, Commander Naval Support Activities, Saigon
  - RADM H.S. Mathews Deputy U.S. Naval Force Vietnam
  - Lt. Gen H. Nickerson Jr. USMC Commander III Marine Amphibious Corps
  - Lt. Gen; Buss USMC Commander FMFPAC
  - BGEN E.P. Yates USA MACVDC
  - Commodore Chou RVN Navy Chief of Naval Operations
- Mar - Nov 1971, North Danang, Camp Haskins ~ Eight detachments in Vietnam plus dets to the Philippines, Guam, and Alaska. NMCB 5 was the last battalion to deploy to Vietnam March to November 1971. The battalion had numerous incidents with mines on that deployment. NMCB 5 also had an unusual number of flag officer visits again on this deployment.

In 1972, the battalion moved all its troops and equipment to Thailand. The project there was the construction of Nam Phong Air Base.

=== Seabee Teams ===
- 0501 DanPau, Jan 1963
- 0501 Buom Me Ga, Apr 1963 7th Special Forces airstrip
- 0502 Tri Ton Jan 1963
- 0502 Chau Lang ~ ~ ~ ~ ~ ~ ~5th Special Forces airstrip
- 0502 Dan Chau, Jun 1963 ~ ~5th Special Forces Camp and airstrip
- 0503 Minh Thanh, Jan 1964 ~ 5th Special Forces
- 0503 Moc Hoa, Mar 1964 ~ ~ 5th Special Forces
- 0503 Bu Gia Map, Jun 1964 ~ 5th Special Forces
- 0504 Pleiku, Jan 1964 ~ ~ ~ ~5th Special Forces Camp and airstrip
- 0504 Kannack Special, Feb 1964 5th Special Forces Camp and airstrip
- 0504 Dong Ba Thin, May 1964 5th Special Forces Camp and airstrip
- 0504 Nha Trang, May 1964
- 0505 Quang Tri, Oct 1964
- 0505 Phar Rang, Dec 1964
- 0506 Quang Ngai, Oct 1964
- 0506 Da Nang, Mar 1965
- 0507 Dran, Nov 1965
- MTT#5 Pleiku, Oct 1965 (Well drilling team)
- 0509 Thoai Son, Dec 1966
- 0510 Tan An, Jan 1967
- 0511 Bao Trai, Sep 1967
- 0511 Go Dau Ha, Jan 1968
- 0513 Tan Son Nhut, 0Dec 1968
- 0513 Ben Tre, Jan 1969
- 0514 Phu Vinh, Feb 1969
- 0517 Ben Tre, Apr 1970
- Det. Ba To 1970 ~ ~ ~ ~ ~ ~ ~ ~Special Forces Camp runway upgrade
- 0518 Soc Trang, Mar 1971

=== Post Vietnam, Iraq ===
NMCB 5 history

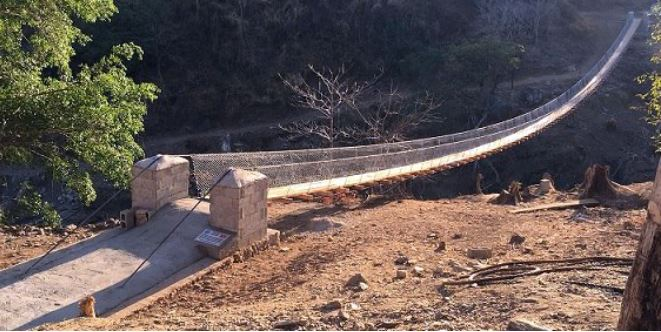
Suspension bridge built by NMCB 5 CCAD in Timor-Liste 2015(Seabee Museum)

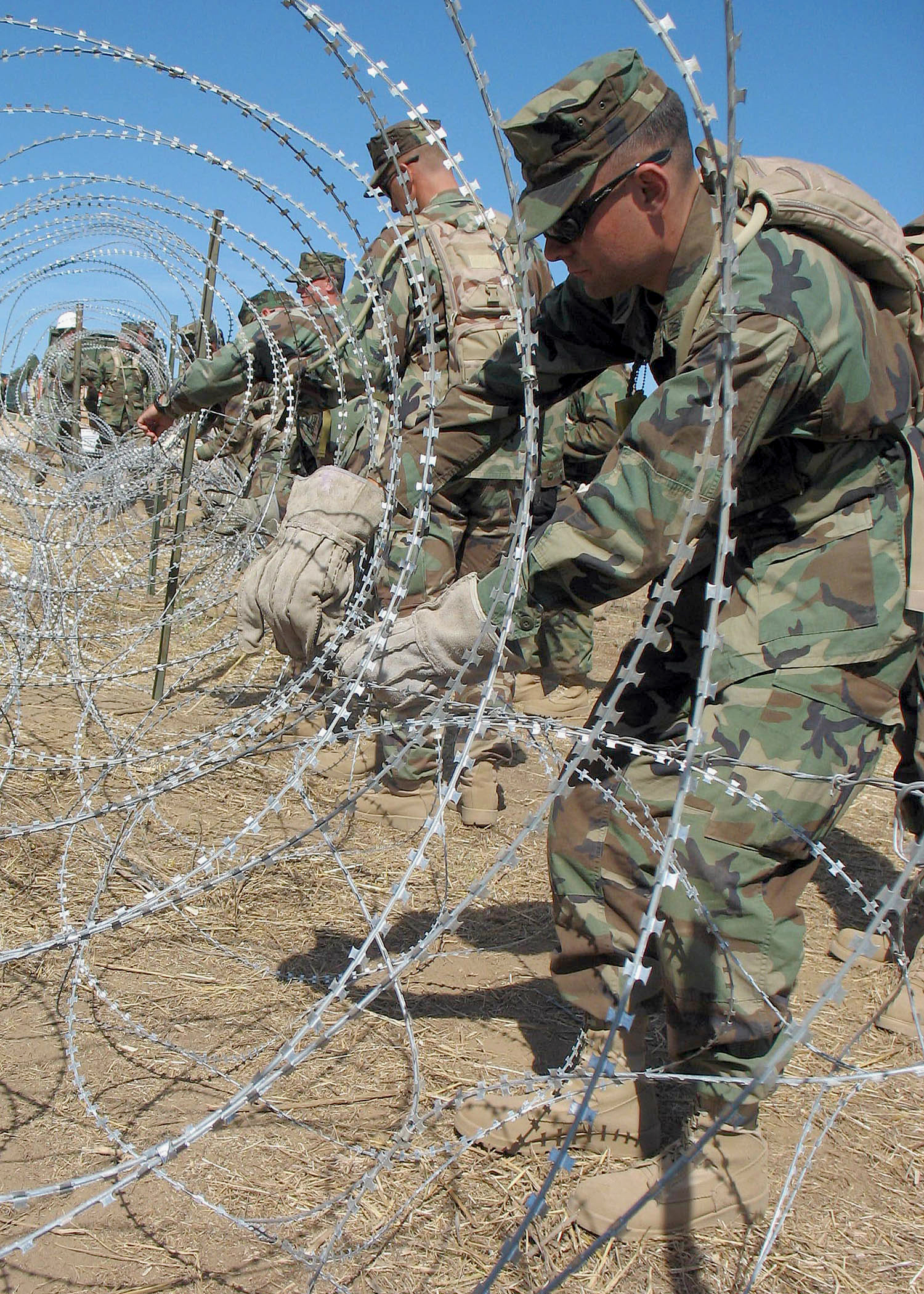
US Navy 081014-N-1205P-121 Chiefs and officers of NMCB 5 practice setting up a triple-strand concertina wire fence during 5's field exercise at Camp Pendleton in 2008.

- On August 7, 1990 CBs 4, 5, 7, and 40 were ordered to start preparations for Operation Desert Shield. From January through March, 1991 NMCB Five provided support to the 1st Marine Expeditionary Force for both Operation Desert Shield and Operation Desert Storm. There were projects at Ahmed Al Jaber Air Base, Ali Al Salem Air Base and Camp Moreell.
- On March 21, 2003, Five's Seabee Engineering Reconnaissance Team SERT-5 along with four other SERTs crossed from Kuwait into Iraq with Task Force Tarawa. They were an element of the 1st Marine Expeditionary Force Engineer Group(1MEF) and the lead SERT for the 2nd Marine Division. Their assignment was to evaluate Road 16 from An Nasiriyah to Amarah and from there Road 17 on to Qalat Sukkar and ultimately to the outskirts of Ad Diwaniyah as well as all the bridges along the way. It is believed that the team was the first Seabees to come under fire since the Vietnam war. SERT-5 was augmented by three members of UnderwaterConstruction Team 2. SERT-5 was relieved by the SERT-4 at the airfield outside Qalat Sukkar.
- NMCB Five was called into action again in support of the Global War on Terrorism during its 2005 deployment. Personnel from NMCB Five were integrated with reserve unit NMCB TWO SEVEN sending over 330 personnel to various locations throughout Southwest Asia. Majority of the work was in support of Special Operations Command with many sites being classified. Many personnel provided direct support to the Iraqi Army by constructing bases and facilities to support their ongoing struggle for stability.
- NMCB FIVE was deployed to Afghanistan from February to August in 2009 to work on Camp Leatherneck. The battalion returned again in 2010.

=== Disaster recovery ===
- 1962 Typhoon Karen Guam Naval Base, MCB 5 set up 500 tents for the islanders
- 1989 Hurricane Hugo Charleston, SC, Antigua and Puerto Rico
- 1995 Hurricane Luis Antigua, St. Thomas, St. John
- 1995 Hurricane Marilyn Antigua, St. Thomas, St. John
- 1993 Ventura County fires
- 2000 Alaska Airlines Flight 261 crash

== List of commanding officers ==
Commanding officer	Period	Deployed to	Detachments
Lt Cmdr Edgar S. Winham	Jun 42- Mar 44	Island X	Midway atoll, Palmyra atoll, Canton Is, Johnson Isl, French Frigate Shoals, Kauai, NAS Honolulu, T.H.
" - - - - - - - - - - - - - - - - - - -"	Jan- Dec 45	Calicoan Island	Cebu City, Iloilo City, Parang, Mindanao, Balikpapan, Borneo
Cmdr. Irwin M. Smith	Oct 51-Jul 53	Subic Bay	
Cmdr. Irwin M. Smith	Sep 53 - Oct 54	Subic Bay	
Cmdr. Irwin M. Smith	Jan 55 - Oct 55	Subic Bay	
Cmdr. H.W. Whitney	1959-60	Guam	
Cmdr. D.E.Kean	1960-61	Okinawa	
Cmdr John Richey	1961-62	Okinawa	
Cmdr. James S Burfield	Nov 62 - Mar 64	Guam	
Cmdr W.F. Russell	1964-65	Okinawa	
Cmdr W. F Russell	1965 - 66	Vietnam	
Cmdr. E. J. Williams Jr.	1966-67	Vietnam	
Cmdr. E.J. Williams Jr.	1967-68	Vietnam	22 detachments in support of the Marines throughout the northern I Corps region
Cmdr. Robert A. Schade Jr.	1968-69	Vietnam	
Cmdr. Robert A. Schade Jr.	1969-70	Vietnam	
Cmdr. Robert A. Schade Jr.	Nov 70- May 71	Vietnam	Vietnam dets Bronco, Maverick, Mustang, Pinto, & Stallion, Adak, Guam, Philippines
Cmdr. Robert J. McHugh Jr.	May 72- Nov 72	Okinawa	Nam Phong, Thailand
Cmdr. Robert J. McHugh Jr.	1973-74	Okinawa	Philippines, Taiwan, Sasebo, Iwakuni, Yokosuka, Seabee team 0522 USS Sanctuary
Cmdr. R W. AuerBach Jr	1974-75	Puerto Rico	
Cmdr. David C. de Vicq	1975-76	Diego Garcia	
Cmdr. David C. de Vicq	1976-77	Rota Spain	Greece, Crete, Sardinia, Sicily, Spain, Scotland
Cmdr Donald Austin	Dec 77 - Sep 78	Puerto Rico	Guantanamo Bay, Eleuthera, Keflavick, Diego Garcia
Cmdr.Donald Austin	Mar-Nov 79	Diego Garcia	Clark AB, Philippines
Cmdr. J.T. Patterson	May 80 - Jan 81	Guam	Diego Garcia, Yokosuka Japan, Midway, Pearl Harbor, Seabee team Palau
Cmdr K.C.Kelley	Jul 81 - Mar 82	Rota Spain	Diego Garcia, Nea Makri Greece, Sigonella NAS, Naples
Cmdr K.C.Kelley	Aug 82 _ Apr 83	Puerto Rico	Gitmo, Bermuda, Andros Isl., Vieques Isl., Seabee team Yap Isl.
	Feb-Oct 86	Subic Bay	Sigonella & Lappedusa Italy
Cmdr. F.W Dew	May 87 - Jan 88	Puerto Rico	Guantanamo Bay, Andrus Isl., Camp David, Damneck Va., Vieques Isl., Panama, Honduras, Haiti
Cmdr. D.F. Walsh	Oct 89 - May 90	Puerto Rico	NAS Rodman Panama, NAS Bermuda, Abdros Isl., NAVFAC Antigua, Camp David, Hurricane Hugo
Cmdr. D.F. Walsh	Aug 90 - Apr 91	Saudi Arabia	Operations Desert Shield and Storm
Cmdr. H.B. Wittaker II	Jan - Aug 92	Okinawa	Adak and Kodiak, Alaska, Pohang and Chinhae, Korea and Saaebo, Fuji, Iwakuni, Yokoauka and Atsugi, Japan
Cmdr. R.L Phillips	Mar - Oct 93	Puerto Rico	El Salvador, Belize, Columbia, Grenada, St. Kitts, Trinidad
	May - Dec 94	Okinawa	Adak and Kodiak, Alaska, Camp Hialeah, Pohang and Chinhae, Korea and Saaebo, Fuji, Iwakuni, Yokoauka and Atsugi, Japan
Cmdr. J. M. Barrett	Jul 95 - Aug 96	Guantanamo Bay	Puerto Rico, Vieques, Panama, Little Creek Va, Key West Fl, Norfolk Va
Cmdr. D.P. King	Nov 97 - Sep 98	Puerto Rico	Andros Isl., Guantanamo Bay, Jacksonville Fl., Norfolk Va., Vieques Isl.
Cmdr. M.A. Handley	Jan-Aug 1999	Okinawa	Pohang & Chinhae So. Korea, Atsugi, Iwakunhi, Sasebo, & Yokosuka Japan
Cmdr. D.L. Fleisch	May-Dec 2001	Okinawa	Pohang & Chinhae So. Korea, Atsugi, East Timor, Iwakunhi, Sasebo, & Yokosuka Japan
Capt. B. Cook	2002	Rota Spain	Kuwait Operation Enduring Freedom
	2005	Island X	Special Operations support. Site locations remain "classified" information.
	Aug 09	Afghanistan	Camp Leatherneck
Cmdr. S.T. Sanders	2010	Afghanistan	I Marine Expeditionary Force
Cmdr. P.J. Maculan	2012	Rota Spain and Djibouti Africa	Combined Joint Task Force - Horn of Africa
Cmdr. C.J. Geertsema	Feb 2015	Okinawa	Japan, South Korea, Diego Garcia, Cambodia, Timor Leste, Papua New Guinea, Mongolia, Indonesia, Malaysia, Thailand, San Clemente Island, Ca., Philippines

== Unit Awards ==
- Navy Unit Commendation 1967 Vietnam
- Navy Unit Commendation 1971, 8 man det Vietnam
- Navy Meritorious Unit Commendation 1971
- Navy Meritorious Unit Commendation 1971, 9 man det Vietnam
- Navy Meritorious Unit Commendation 1971, 14 man det Vietnam
- Navy Unit Commendation 1971 Vietnam
- Navy Meritorious Unit Commendation 1989
- Coast Guard Meritorious Unit Commendation 2000
- Navy Unit Commendation 01Mar2005–28Feb2006 2D Marine Division
- Presidential Unit Citation USN/USMC 2009-10 Marine Expeditionary Brigade-Afghanistan
- Navy "E" Ribbon : – U.S. Atlantic Fleet Battle "E" 14 times.
- Peltier Award: – 4 times.
- Best of Type: Seabee Team 0517
- Naval Construction Brigade Commander's Commendation
- Commendatory letter, Major General Hugh H. Casey, U.S.Army Chief Engineer 31 Aug, 1945

Campaign and service awards Vietnam Service MCB 5 saw service in 13 of the award periods.

- American Campaign Medal - Territory Hawaii
- Asiatic-Pacific Campaign Medal w/2 bronze stars
- World War II Victory Medal
- Vietnam Campaign Medal service ribbon with 60– Device : –
- Vietnam Service Medal: –
- Navy Expeditionary Medal 1979
- U.S. Coast Guard Special Operations Service Ribbon 1989
- Humanitarian Service Medal 1989
- Global War on Terrorism Expeditionary Medal
- Afghanistan Campaign Medal
- Iraq Campaign Medal

== See also ==
- Admiral Ben Moreell
- Amphibious Construction Battalion 1 (ACB-1)
- Amphibious Construction Battalion 2 (ACB-2)
- Civil Engineer Corps United States Navy
- Naval Construction Battalion
- Naval Amphibious Base Little Creek
- Naval Amphibious Base Coronado
- Naval Construction Battalion Center (Gulfport, Mississippi)
- Naval Construction Battalion Center Port Hueneme
- Naval Mobile Construction Battalion 1
- Naval Mobile Construction Battalion 3
- Naval Mobile Construction Battalion 4
- Naval Mobile Construction Battalion 11
- Naval Mobile Construction Battalion 133
- Seabees in World War II
- Seabee
- Underwater Construction Teams

== External links and further reading ==
- Deployment completion reports: After action reports for NMCB-5
- 5 NCB & NMCB 5 Unit Histories and Cruisebooks NHHC: Seabee Museum
