= FedEx Express Flight 087 =

1999 aviation accident in the Philippines

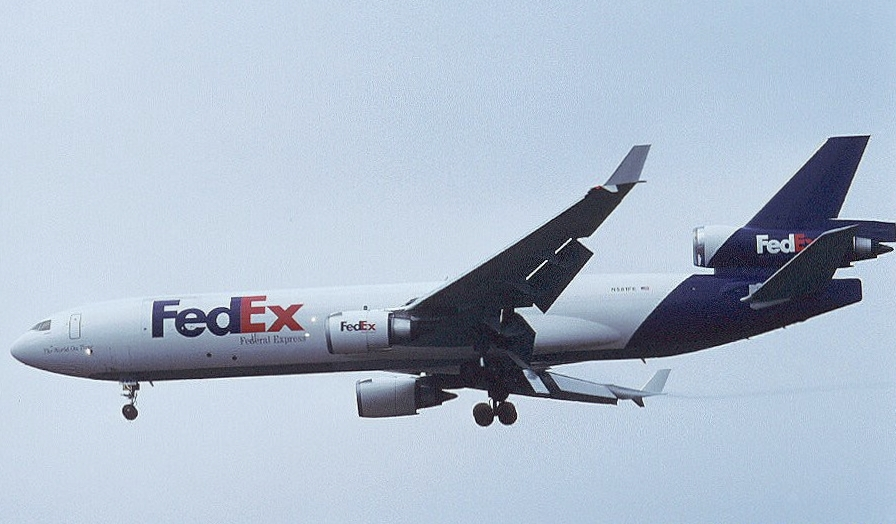
- N581FE, the aircraft involved in the accident, seen in 1997

Accident
- Date: 17 October 1999
- Summary: Runway excursion due to blockage of pitot tubes and pilot error
- Site: Subic Bay International Airport, Olongapo City, Philippines; 14°48′00″N 120°17′06″E

Aircraft
- Aircraft type: McDonnell Douglas MD-11F
- Aircraft name: Joshua
- Operator: FedEx Express
- IATA flight No.: FX087
- ICAO flight No.: FDX087
- Call sign: FEDEX 87
- Registration: N581FE
- Flight origin: Shanghai Hongqiao International Airport, Shanghai, China
- Destination: Subic Bay International Airport, Bataan, Philippines
- Occupants: 2
- Crew: 2
- Fatalities: 0
- Injuries: 2
- Survivors: 2

On 17 October 1999, FedEx Express Flight 087, a McDonnell Douglas MD-11F, crashed after landing at Subic Bay International Airport. The aircraft was operating from Shanghai Hongqiao International Airport. Upon landing, the aircraft rolled down the whole length of the runway before plunging into the Subic Bay where it was mostly submerged. Both pilots survived with minor injuries. The aircraft was written off.

The cause of the accident was the pilots failing to respond to false airspeed indications and not selecting the correct airspeed indications. Contributing factors were clogged pitot drain holes and excessive landing speed.

== Background ==
=== Aircraft ===
The aircraft involved, manufactured by McDonnell Douglas in 1990, was a nine-year-old McDonnell Douglas MD-11F with aircraft registration N581FE and serial number 48419. The aircraft had logged 30,278 total airframe hours in 5,817 flight cycles. It was powered by three General Electric CF6 engines.

=== Crew ===
On board the aircraft were only two pilots:

- In command was 53-year-old Captain Michael Rooney. He had a total of 14,000 flight hours and 1,430 hours of experience on the MD-11. The captain was employed by Flying Tiger Line in the 1980s as a co-pilot on the Douglas DC-8 and the Boeing 747. Since the company's merger with FedEx, he had been a captain on the Boeing 727, and in April 1996, he began flying the MD-11 as a captain.
- The co-pilot was 43-year-old First Officer Cynthia Hubbard. She flew a total of 5,700 flight hours and had 2,300 hours of experience on the MD-11. Prior to joining FedEx, she served in the United States Air Force (USAF) for eight years as a captain on the Boeing 737 and the Lockheed C-5 Galaxy. After joining FedEx, she worked as a flight engineer on the Boeing 727 and the McDonnell Douglas DC-10, before qualifying as a co-pilot on the MD-11.

== Accident ==
The Subic Special Economic and Freeport Zone was formerly the site of the Subic Naval Base, and a small airport was one of FedEx's hubs.

The aircraft was fully loaded with cargo, and it mostly consisted of electronic goods and garments.

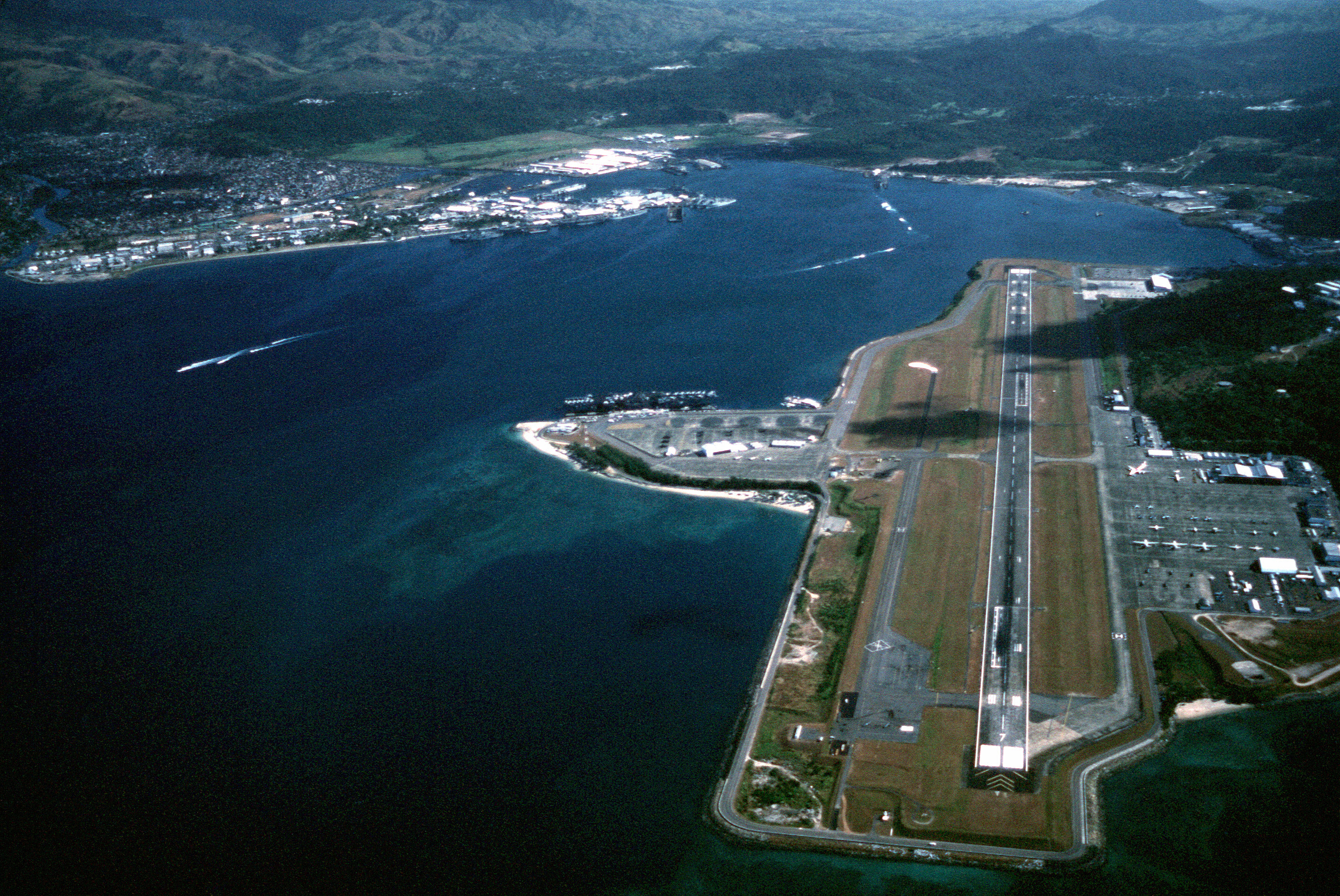
Subic Bay International Airport in 1990

At around 13:00 UTC, the aircraft took off from Shanghai Hongqiao International Airport. At 37,000 feet (11,000 m), the aircraft encountered moderate turbulence, 43 minutes before landing. At 3:24 p.m., the cockpit voice recorder (CVR) heard the captain's message "airspeed returned, there is no problem. I've got no speed problem." At 3:32 p.m., the CVR recorded the pilots again discussing airspeed. One minute later, the overspeed warning and the autopilot disengagement alarm were activated. At 3:53 p.m., the captain instructed the first officer to set the flaps to 50 degrees, and the first officer moved the flap levers to the 50-degree position. However, the flaps did not extend to 50 degrees, so the first officer moved the flap levers back to the 35-degree position. At 3:54 p.m., at an altitude of 500 feet (150 m), the rate of descent warning and the ground proximity warning system (GPWS) were activated. At 15:55:04, the aircraft landed on runway 07 at Subic Bay International Airport. The aircraft did not stop on the runway but came into contact with the localizer antenna and the approach lights. The aircraft plunged into the Subic Bay, became mostly submerged, and broke apart. The nose of the aircraft broke away and the cargo fell out of the hold. The wing and nose of the aircraft were damaged. The aircraft sank 32 feet (9.8 m) from the airport's shoreline. The aircraft had hit a concrete post and wire fence.

The pilots escaped through the cockpit windows and waited for rescue on the wing. The pilots suffered minor injuries. The pilots were later treated at Legenda Hospital in Cubi Point. FedEx later released a statement saying it was "thankful" that the crew was safe. The aircraft was leaking fuel into the water, which prompted airport authorities to surround the aircraft with a boom to prevent fuel from spreading. Most of the cargo was destroyed. The aircraft was destroyed and written off.

== Investigation ==
During an interview with the pilots, the captain said there was no problem with the airspeed indicator from takeoff to the time of the climb to cruising altitude. After the aircraft encountered clouds during cruise, the autopilot was disengaged several times and an airspeed (IAS) warning appeared on the primary flight display (PFD) on the captain's side. The captain compared the airspeed indicator with the first officer's airspeed indicator, and when an error was observed, the source of the airspeed indicator on the first officer's side switched to the air data computer (ADC) on the captain's side. The captain testified that he did not notice any abnormalities except that he felt that the elevator rudder was operating slightly differently during the landing approach. On the final approach, the flaps could not be extended to 50 degrees, so the approach remained at 35 degrees, but the captain was not particularly worried. The captain said he was aware of the existence of a checklist for airspeed problems but had never been trained to use it.

The first officer also testified that there was no problem with the airspeed indicator from takeoff to cruising altitude. The first officer said she was aware of the existence of a checklist for airspeed issues, but did not refer to it because the problem was solved by unifying the ADC. She also said that she had never encountered a situation in which the PFD displayed an IAS warning, and that she had not been trained for such a situation.

=== Pitot tube inspection and testing ===
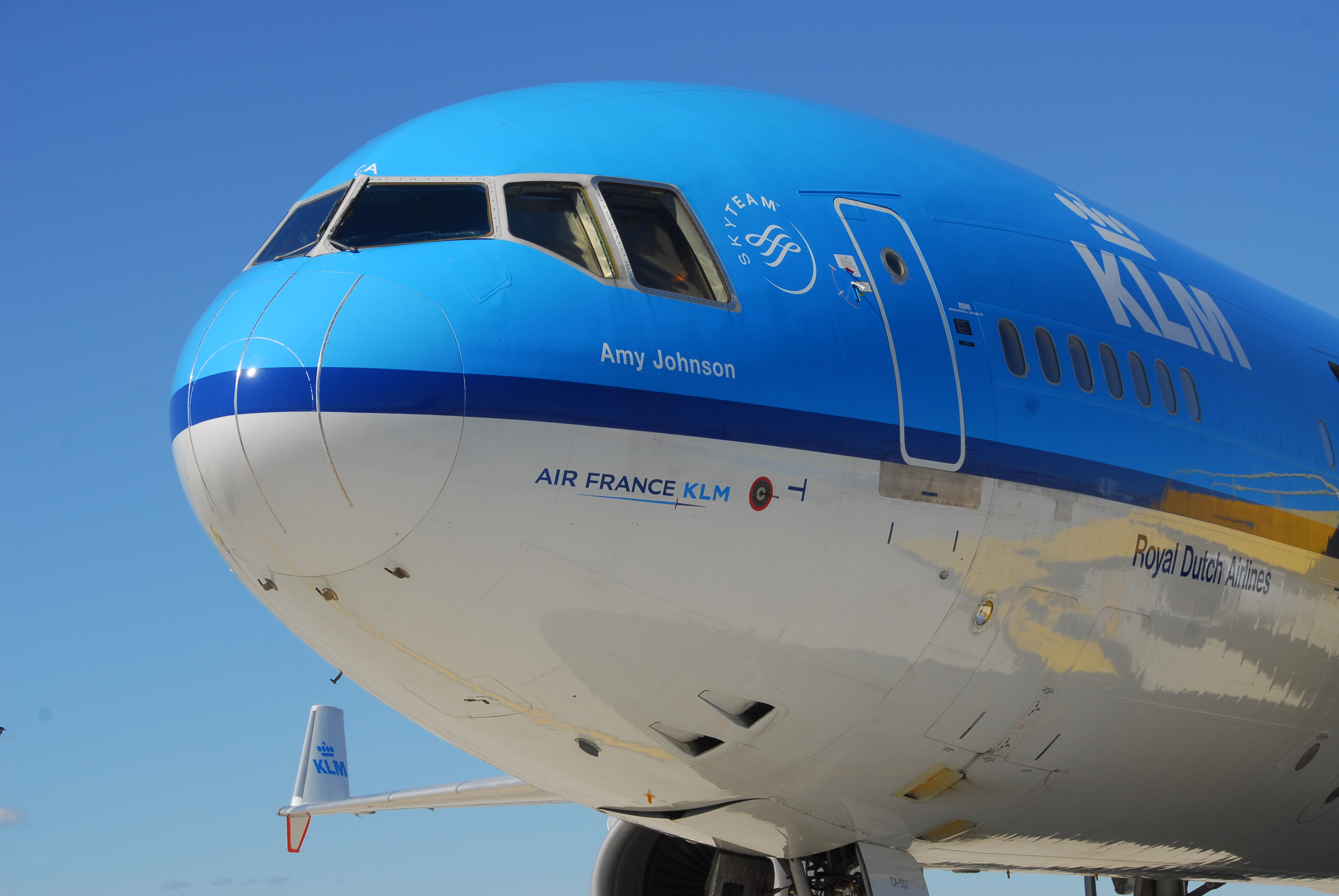
Three pitot tubes are installed in the nose of MD-11s, just below the cockpit

Airspeed and altitude were calculated based on outside air pressure measured by a pitot tube. The MD-11 was equipped with three pitot tubes, each measuring data for the captain's side of the instrument, the co-pilot's side of the instrument, and the backup instrument. In addition, there were two drain holes in the pitot pipe. An inspection of the drain in the pitot tube on the co-pilot's side revealed that one of the two pipes was blocked by transparent crystalline particles. In addition, the tip of the pitot tube was also blocked by white crystalline particles and dead insects. The drain of the pitot tube on the captain's side was both blocked by white and brown residue, respectively, and the tip was also blocked by the same particles as the co-pilot's side. Honeywell and Boeing conducted the experiment under the supervision of the Federal Aviation Administration (FAA). In the experiment, a certain amount of water was put into the pitot tube. As a result, it was found that there was an error in the measured data, and the airspeed was displayed as 12 knots (14 mph; 22 km/h) slower than it actually was. This was consistent with the initial error on the aircraft. Further experiments were conducted to test the extent of the error between descent and landing. There had been past reports of abnormal airspeed in the accident aircraft. FedEx had taken various measures, but had not inspected the drain, which was "maybe" the root of the problem.

=== Airspeed discrepancies ===
According to the cockpit voice recorder and Digital Flight Data Recorder (DFDR) recordings, the airspeed discrepancy began to occur 43 minutes before landing. Ninety seconds later, the autopilot was released while the aircraft was cruising 37,000 feet (11,000 m). According to Boeing, the autopilot was designed to automatically disengage if there was an error of more than 12 knots (14 mph; 22 km/h) in the airspeed value. An error of 12 knots (14 mph; 22 km/h) was initially introduced in the captain's instrument system, and then increased as the flight descended, resulting in a difference of 45 knots (52 mph; 83 km/h). This was similar to the data obtained in the experiment.

=== Causes of the accident ===
The final report attributed the accident to the flight crew's failure to respond appropriately to the incorrect airspeed indication and to recognize the correct airspeed. In addition, the pitot pipe drain was blocked, the alarm system that alerted the airspeed abnormality was insufficient, there was excessive landing speed, and the checklist procedure did not include reference to backup instruments.

=== Recommendations ===
The report recommended that all DC-10, MD-11, and MD-10 operators to do a detailed inspection of the pitot tubes at frequent intervals and change training to emphasize correcting erroneous airspeed indications.

== Aftermath ==
This was the second major FedEx crash after FedEx Express Flight 14. The next major crash for FedEx was FedEx Express Flight 1478.

Following some incidents and this accident, FedEx decided that semiannual training was more effective for their flight crews than annual recurrent training.

As a result of this accident and other reports of airspeed anomalies by other operators of the McDonnell Douglas MD-11, the MD-11 Flight Crew Operating Manual was revised by Boeing on 15 June 2000. It was revised so it could provide additional guidance to flight crews. The manual states that if the "SEL FADEC ALTN", "SEL ELEV FEEL MAN", and "SEL FLAP LIM OVRD" alerts are displayed simultaneously, any crew should use these alerts as indications to follow the "Airspeed Lost, Suspect, or Erratic" checklist.

== See also ==
- Birgenair Flight 301
