= APEC Philippines 1996 =

Eighth meeting of the APEC economic forum

- Host country: Philippines
- Date: 24—25 November
- Venues: Main venue Subic Bay Freeport Zone, Olongapo City, Philippines Other meetings 4 host locations: Manila; Olongapo City; Cebu City; Davao
- Follows: 1995
- Precedes: 1997

Key points
- "The Path to a Brighter and More Attainable Future”

APEC Philippines 1996 was a series of Asia-Pacific Economic Cooperation meetings focused on economic cooperation, held on 24 and 25 November 1996 at the Subic Bay Freeport Zone in Olongapo City and other locations in the Philippines. It was the eighth APEC meeting, and the first held in the Philippines.

Militant organization al-Qaeda failed in an attempt to assassinate U.S. president Bill Clinton as he visited for the meetings. They planned to bomb the presidential motorcade as it traveled through Manila, but before its drive commenced, the plot was uncovered, and the bomb was found planted under a bridge.

== Preparations ==
Summary video of the APEC Philippines 1996 Meeting

During the November 1994 APEC Summit in Indonesia, the Philippines was chosen to host the fourth APEC Economic Leaders' Meeting in 1996. As early as 5 December 1994, President Fidel V. Ramos signed Administrative Order No. 160 that created a national commission in preparation for the meetings. The National Organizing Commission (APEC-NOC) was chaired by the Secretary of Foreign Affairs, with the Secretary of Trade and Industry and the Executive Secretary as co-chairs.

=== Venues ===
Four Philippine cities were designated as venues for the year-long series of meetings: Olongapo City, Manila, Cebu and Davao. Olongapo hosted the Economic Leaders' Meeting just four years after it reopened as a free port zone following the closure of the US naval and air force base there due to the 1991 Mount Pinatubo eruption.

To accommodate the delegations of the 18 economic leaders who attended the summit, the government had to build new road, transportation, convention and housing infrastructure. These include Subic Bay International Airport, Subic-Tipo Road and a series of 18 villas along Triboa Bay where each economic leader and its entourage was billeted. The villas alone were reported to have cost around US$1–2 million each and were built on land that used to be an ammunition and explosives dump for the former US bases. It took eight months and 4,000 workers to complete the villas.

In Manila, the Philippine International Convention Center in Pasay was chosen as venue for the APEC Ministerial Meetings. To shuttle ministers from 18 APEC member economies from their hotel to the convention center, the Metropolitan Manila Development Authority (MMDA) created "Friendship Lanes", two lanes each in four major Metro Manila roads such as Roxas Boulevard for the exclusive use of the delegates' vehicles.

=== Security ===
As part of the preparation for the summit, the Philippines strengthened its security force. At least 26,000 police and soldiers were deployed to ensure the security of the delegates and guests. President Ramos assured APEC participants of their security in his speech during the inauguration of Subic Bay International Airport. On 22 November 1996, two days before the Economic Leaders' Summit, the US State Department, through its spokesperson Nicholas Burns, warned American citizens in the Philippines to take security precautions following threats against American diplomats attending the summit.

U.S. president Bill Clinton was present at the meetings. Osama bin Laden, head of the militant organization al-Qaeda, organized a plot to assassinate Clinton by bombing the presidential motorcade as it traveled through Manila. Before the motorcade left, however, U.S. intelligence agents intercepted a message between al-Qaeda agents about the plan, and alerted the U.S. Secret Service. Clinton was unharmed, and the bomb was found planted under a bridge. The incident was revealed in 2009.

== APEC Economic Leaders' Meeting ==
=== Attendees ===
This was the first APEC meeting for Australian Prime Minister John Howard and Japanese Prime Minister Ryutaro Hashimoto, and was the last APEC meeting for Papua New Guinean Prime Minister Julius Chan and Thai Prime Minister Banharn Silpa-archa.

Attendees at the 1996 APEC Economic Leaders' Meeting
Country	Position	Name
Australia	Prime Minister	John Howard
Brunei	Sultan	Hassanal Bolkiah
Canada	Prime Minister	Jean Chrétien
Chile	President	Eduardo Frei Ruiz-Tagle
China	President	Jiang Zemin
Hong Kong	Finance Secretary	Donald Tsang
Indonesia	President	Suharto
Japan	Prime Minister	Ryutaro Hashimoto
South Korea	President	Kim Young Sam
Malaysia	Prime Minister	Mahathir Mohamad
Mexico	President	Ernesto Zedillo
New Zealand	Prime Minister	Jim Bolger
Papua New Guinea	Prime Minister	Julius Chan
Philippines	President	Fidel Ramos
Singapore	Prime Minister	Goh Chok Tong
Chinese Taipei	Special Representative	Koo Chen-fu
Thailand	Prime Minister	Banharn Silpa-archa
United States	President	Bill Clinton

=== Results ===
Individual action plans by member economies were compiled into the Manila Action Plan which had a goal of achieving the Bogor liberation target. The Information Technology Agreement was endorsed by the APEC leaders which was later adopted at the World Trade Organization ministerial meeting in Singapore weeks after the leaders' meeting.
