= Subic Bay International Airport =

Commercial airport in the Philippines

Subic Bay International Airport Paliparang Pandaigdig ng Look ng Subic
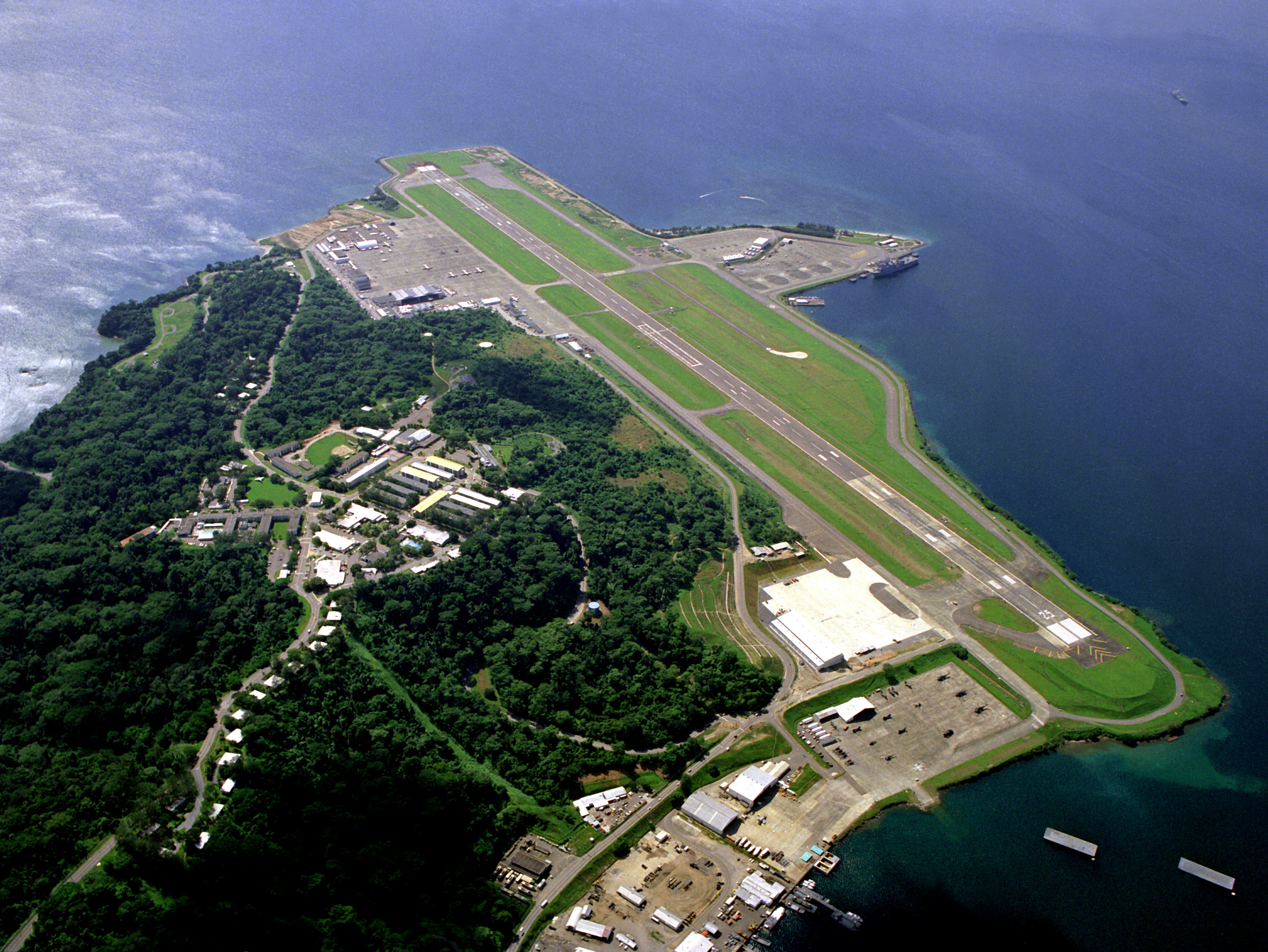
- Aerial view of Subic Bay International Airport
- IATA: SFS; ICAO: RPLB; WMO: 98426

Summary
- Airport type: Public
- Owner/Operator: Subic Bay Metropolitan Authority
- Serves: Zambales and Bataan
- Location: Cubi Point, Subic Bay Freeport Zone, Olongapo City, Philippines
- Opened: November 1992; 33 years ago
- Elevation AMSL: 20 m (66 ft)
- Coordinates: 14°47′39″N 120°16′15″E

Map
- Location within Luzon Location within Philippines

Runways
Direction	Length		Surface
Direction	m	ft	Surface
07/25	2,744	9,003	Asphalt

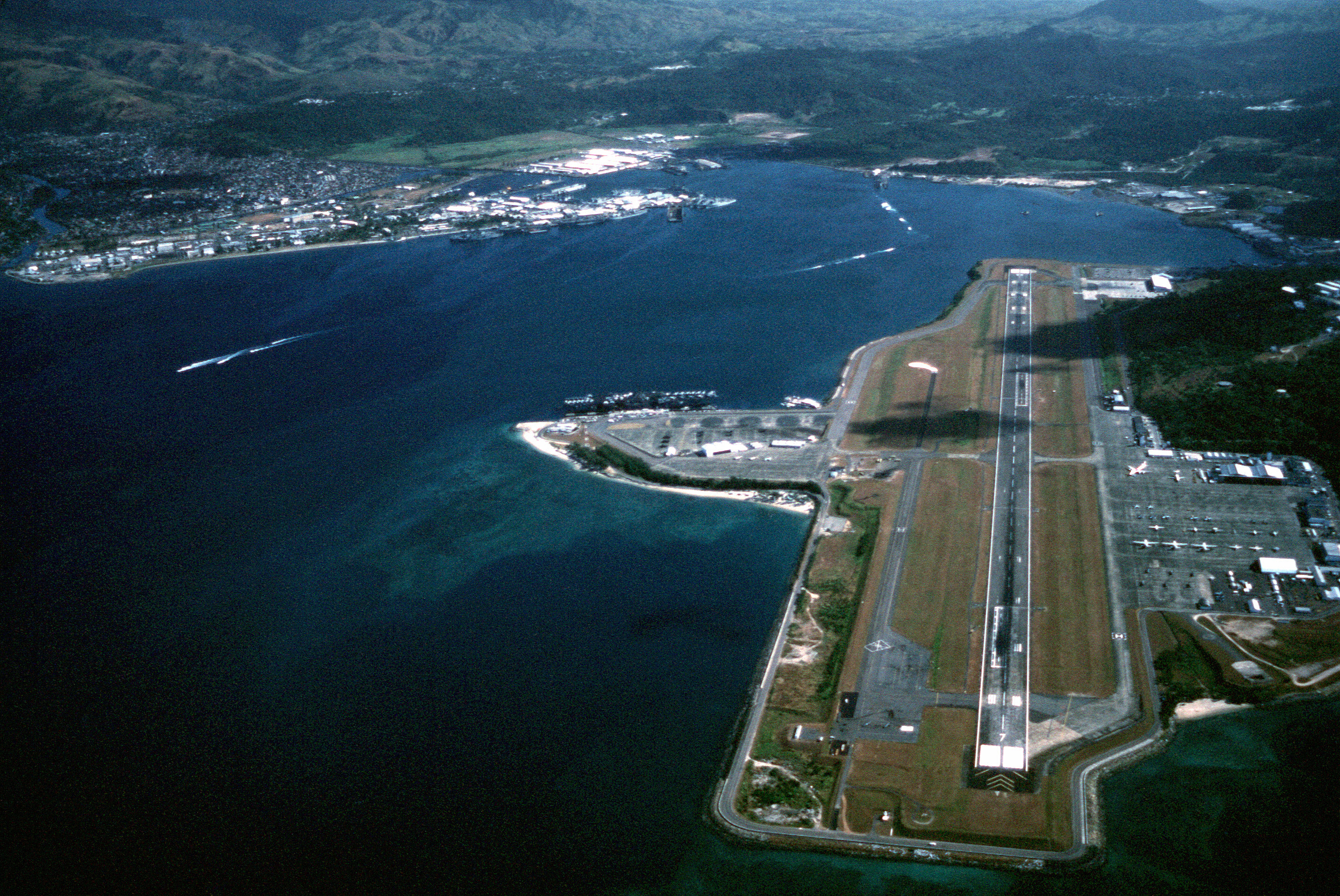
Subic Bay International Airport

Subic Bay International Airport (IATA: SFS, ICAO: RPLB) serves as a secondary and diversion airport for the Ninoy Aquino International Airport in Metro Manila and Clark International Airport in Pampanga. It also serves the immediate area of the Subic Bay Freeport Zone, the provinces of Bataan and Zambales, and the general area of Olongapo City in the Philippines.

The airport was known as the Naval Air Station Cubi Point, part of the Subic Naval Base of the United States Navy before its closure.

== History ==
In 1950, Admiral Arthur W. Radford, Commander-in-Chief of the United States Pacific Fleet, envisioned a naval base in the Western Pacific to enhance Seventh Fleet capabilities. The Korean War began and the Navy realized it had a need for an air station in the region. Cubi Point in the Philippines was selected, and civilian contractors were initially approached for the project. After seeing the Zambales Mountains and the surrounding jungle, they claimed it could not be done.

The U.S. Navy then turned to the Seabees and was told this would not be a problem. The first Seabees to arrive were surveyors of Construction Battalion Detachment 1802. Mobile Construction Battalion 3 arrived on 2 October 1951 to get the project going and was joined by MCB 5 in November. Over the next five years, MCBs 2, 7, 9, 11 and CBD 1803 also contributed to the effort. They leveled a mountain to make way for a nearly 2-mile-long (3.2 km) runway. NAS Cubi Point turned out to be one of the largest earth-moving projects in the world, equivalent to the construction of the Panama Canal. Seabees there moved 20 million cubic yards (15 million cubic metres) of dry fill plus another 15 million that was hydraulic fill.

The $100 million-facility (equivalent to $881 million in 2024) was commissioned on 25 July 1956, and comprised an air station with an adjacent pier capable of docking the Navy's largest carriers. After decades of use by American forces, Mount Pinatubo erupted in 1991, burying Cubi Point in 18–36 inches (45–90 cm) of ash. Despite this, the American government wished to keep the Subic Naval Base and signed a treaty with the Philippine government.

The treaty was not ratified, however, failing by a slim margin in the Philippine Senate. Attempts to negotiate a new treaty were soon abandoned and the United States was informed that it was to withdraw within one year. U.S. forces withdrew in November 1992, turning over the facility with its airport to the Philippine government.

Initially some 8,000 volunteers guarded the facility and prevented looters from damaging the facilities. The Subic Bay Metropolitan Authority (SBMA) was created to manage the facility by virtue of Republic Act No. 7227 after intense lobbying of then-Mayor Dick Gordon. He was appointed its first chairman and administrator.

Twenty days after the departure of American forces, the airport ushered in its first commercial flight from Taiwan via Makung. In February 1993, NAS Cubi Point was converted to Cubi Point International Airport. To herald its designation as an international airport, President Fidel V. Ramos chose to arrive in November 1993 from an official visit to the United States using the airport. This flight also proved the capabilities of the airport as the President arrived aboard the delivery flight of Philippine Airlines' first Boeing 747-400.

Construction of the present runway by Hanjin Heavy Industries and Construction Philippines began in 1993 and was completed in April 1995, in time for the inaugural landing of FedEx Express MD-11 and the formal opening of FedEx's AsiaOne hub. The newly renamed Subic Bay International Airport was formally opened on 30 September 1996. The new US$12.6-million passenger terminal, with a capacity to handle 6 million passengers per year, and built by Summa Kumagai Inc. (a joint Filipino-Japanese venture) was inaugurated on 4 November 1996, in time for the 4th APEC Leaders' Summit.

Between 1992 and 1995 SBIA welcomed a total of around 100,000 commercial passengers. The airport was expected to handle 110,000 passengers in 1996. In 1997, SBIA topped the 100,000 annual passenger count. For the year 1998, the airport handled a total of around 1,000 international and 6,000 domestic flights, and almost 100,000 inbound and outbound passengers. By 2007 the number of recorded passengers had dropped to 17,648, but due to the presence of the FedEx AsiaOne Hub the airport still handled 115,108 flights.

The FedEx hub lasted until February 2009, when all operations were moved to Guangzhou Baiyun International Airport in Guangzhou, China. Due to this departure, as well as the planned expansion of nearby Clark International Airport, Subic Bay Metropolitan Authority Administrator and CEO Armand C. Arreza expressed interest in closing Subic Bay International Airport in favor of converting the area to a logistics hub in January 2010.

In December 2010, Guam-based Aviation Concepts Inc. set up fixed-base operations at the airport, refurbishing a 100,000-square-foot (9,300 m^{2}) hangar to international standards, with the aim of eventually establishing a full-service aviation center.

In 2016, the airport began to once again be used for daily commercial passenger flights, with Air Juan flying their nine-seater amphibious aircraft to and from their private seaplane base in Manila South Harbor, located north of the CCP Complex.

In 2018, Razon Group acquired Aviation Concepts Technical Services, Inc. (ACTSI) and signed a 25-year lease agreement (as well as a 25-year option) with the local government that will see the airport transformed into a regional business aviation hub, with a fifty plus years potential. The company is refurbishing its 1.8-acre (7,300 m^{2}) facility and targeting to its premiere upgrade in the third quarter of 2019.

In July 2021, the airport was used again for repatriation flights of Overseas Filipino Workers (OFW) which were facilitated by Philippine Airlines. The activity led to the revival of a commercial flight schedule for the first time since 2011 despite the COVID-19 pandemic. Repatriation flights to the airport ended on 22 February 2022 after capacity restrictions at Ninoy Aquino International Airport were eased.

== Future directions ==
=== Subic Bay Airfield ===
The restoration of Subic Bay Airfield (U.S. Naval Base Subic Bay) with a new forward operating base will host the maritime patrol assets for territorial disputes in the South China Sea operations, including joint warfare in line with the Comprehensive Archipelagic Defense Concept (CADC). Situated along the former Naval Air Station Cubi Point at Naval Base Subic Bay edge, the project will enhance its surveillance aircraft and power projection around the South China Sea. Philippine Air Force documents reveal that it will be established at Subic Bay International Airport, especially since the Armed Forces of the Philippines chose SBIA for “Joint Air-Sea-Land Operations,” which can support both attack aircraft and reconnaissance aircraft. In 2022, the government established Naval Operating Base Subic, the 100-hectare northern yard of which is occupied by the Philippine Navy.

== Airlines and destinations ==
As of 2025, there are no airlines which operate scheduled services from the airport.

=== Cargo airlines ===
On 6 February 2009, FedEx Express relocated its hub from the Subic Bay International Airport to the Guangzhou Baiyun International Airport in China. Ground and technical operations were likewise transferred to the Clark International Airport at the Clark Freeport Zone, Pampanga. FedEx's support company, Corporate Air, ceased all operations after the hub closure.

=== Flight training ===
- ACE Pilots Aviation Academy
- Aero Equipment Aviation Inc.
- Alpha Aviation Group
- APG International Aviation Academy
- Asian Institute Of Aviation
- First Aviation Academy Inc.
- Laminar Aviation, Inc.
- OMNI Aviation Corporation

The airport is also a base of a flight school Aeroflite Aviation Corp since 2006.

== Events ==
Subic Bay International Airport hosted a number of wide-bodied aircraft during the seventh APEC Summit in 1996. They included a chartered Royal Brunei Airlines Airbus A340-200, Japanese Air Force One, and the Air Force One, among others.

== Accidents and incidents ==
- On 17 October 1999, FedEx Express Flight 087, a McDonnell Douglas MD-11F, crashed after landing at runway 07. The aircraft was operating from Shanghai Hongqiao International Airport. Upon landing, the aircraft rolled down the whole length of the runway before plunging into the Subic Bay where it was completely submerged except for the cockpit. Both pilots survived with minor injuries. The aircraft was written off. The accident was attributed to the pilot's failure to respond appropriately to the incorrect airspeed indication and to recognize the correct airspeed. In addition, the pitot pipe drain was blocked, the alarm system that alerted the airspeed abnormality was insufficient, and the checklist procedure did not include reference to backup instruments.
