= APEC Canada 1997 =

- Host country: Canada
- Date: 24–25 November
- Venues: Museum of Anthropology at UBC; Vancouver, British Columbia
- Follows: 1996
- Precedes: 1998

APEC Canada 1997 was a series of Asia-Pacific Economic Cooperation meetings focused on economic cooperation, held in Vancouver, British Columbia, Canada on 24–25 November 1997. It was the fifth APEC meeting in history, and the second held in the Americas. Though discussions also involved the admission of Peru, Russia, and Vietnam into the organization (as of 2010, these countries remained APEC's newest members), the meeting focused on development in Asia-Pacific countries, and its implications for the world's economy. The role of the IMF was also discussed, as was the need to strengthen global cooperation with respect to economic activity (EVSL initiative - tariffs), customs procedures, and emergencies. 47% of world trade is done by APEC members. The first day of the meeting was November 24, 1997.

== History ==
The organization first met as a forum in 1989, in an informal meeting meant to facilitate dialogue between member nations (originally 12 including 3 G8 countries). It was intended to liberalize international trade. APEC's three pillars were delineated at the 1995 meeting in Japan.

== Expansion ==
Three new members Russia, Peru and Vietnam, were admitted under a ten-year integration initiative (a decision agreed in 1997 but not converted into formal admission for the new members until 1998). The most recent additions prior to this had been those of Mexico, Papua New Guinea, and Chile in 1991.

1997 was also the year Russia entered the G7, creating the G8.

== Purpose and goals ==
The group ratified a tariff reduction initiative called early voluntary sectoral liberalization (EVSL), which aimed to lower tariffs across 15 economic sectors; the process regarded nine of these as priority areas.

Goals were set regarding financial stability and how it could be achieved through a stronger and more relevant International Monetary Fund. Customs procedures were also discussed, with the goal of improving clearances by 2000.

== Criticism ==
An APEC report, compiled by inquiry commissioner Ted Hughes and including testimonies from over 150 witnesses, concluded that the Royal Canadian Mounted Police used excessive force on protesters during the meeting.

== Attendees ==
Attendees at the 1997 APEC Economic Leaders' Meeting
| Country | Position | Name |
|---|---|---|
| Australia | Prime Minister | John Howard |
| Brunei | Sultan | Hassanal Bolkiah |
| Canada | Prime Minister | Jean Chrétien |
| Chile | President | Eduardo Frei Ruiz-Tagle |
| China | President | Jiang Zemin |
| Hong Kong | Chief Executive | Tung Chee-hwa |
| Indonesia | President | Suharto |
| Japan | Prime Minister | Ryutaro Hashimoto |
| South Korea | President | Kim Young Sam |
| Malaysia | Prime Minister | Mahathir Mohamad |
| Mexico | President | Ernesto Zedillo |
| New Zealand | Prime Minister | Jim Bolger |
| Papua New Guinea | Prime Minister | Bill Skate |
| Philippines | President | Fidel Ramos |
| Singapore | Prime Minister | Goh Chok Tong |
| Chinese Taipei | Special Representative | Koo Chen-fu |
| Thailand | Prime Minister | Chuan Leekpai |
| United States | President | Bill Clinton |

== See also ==
- Excessive use of force at the 1997 APEC Summit
- APEC Peru 2008

| Preceded by APEC Philippines 1996 | APEC meetings 1997 | Succeeded by APEC Malaysia 1998 |
