= Naval Mobile Construction Battalion 3 =

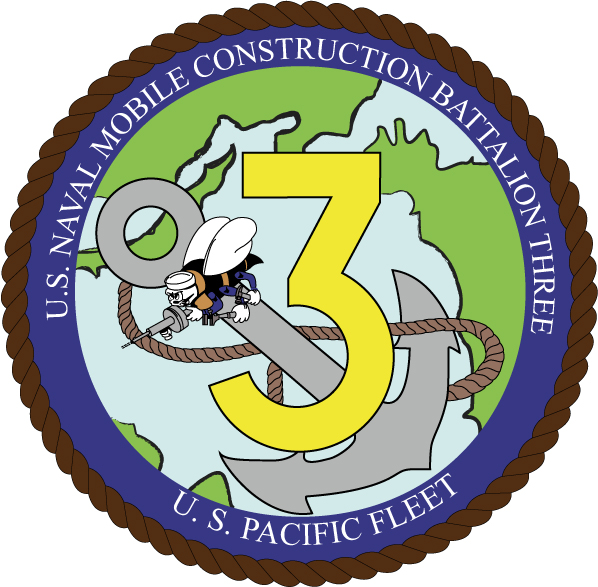
- Active: 15 March 1942–present
- Country: United States
- Branch: USN
- Part of: 1st Naval Construction Group
- Homeport: Port Hueneme California
- Engagements: Operation Flintlock; Operation Catchpole; Vietnam War; Gulf War; Operation Enduring Freedom; Operation Iraqi Freedom

Commanders
- Current commander: CDR Mike Sapienza

Naval Mobile Construction Battalion THREE (NMCB 3) is a United States Navy Seabee that was one of the three original Construction Battalions authorized to be formed in 1942. In May 1942 Naval Construction Battalion 3 deployed to the Territory of Hawaii and designated Brigade Headquarters Battalion for the Hawaiian Area NCF. After seeing service in the South Pacific, the battalion was decommissioned mid-1944. In 1950 the battalion was reactivated and today is home-ported at Port Hueneme, California.

== History ==
=== WWII, CB 3 ===
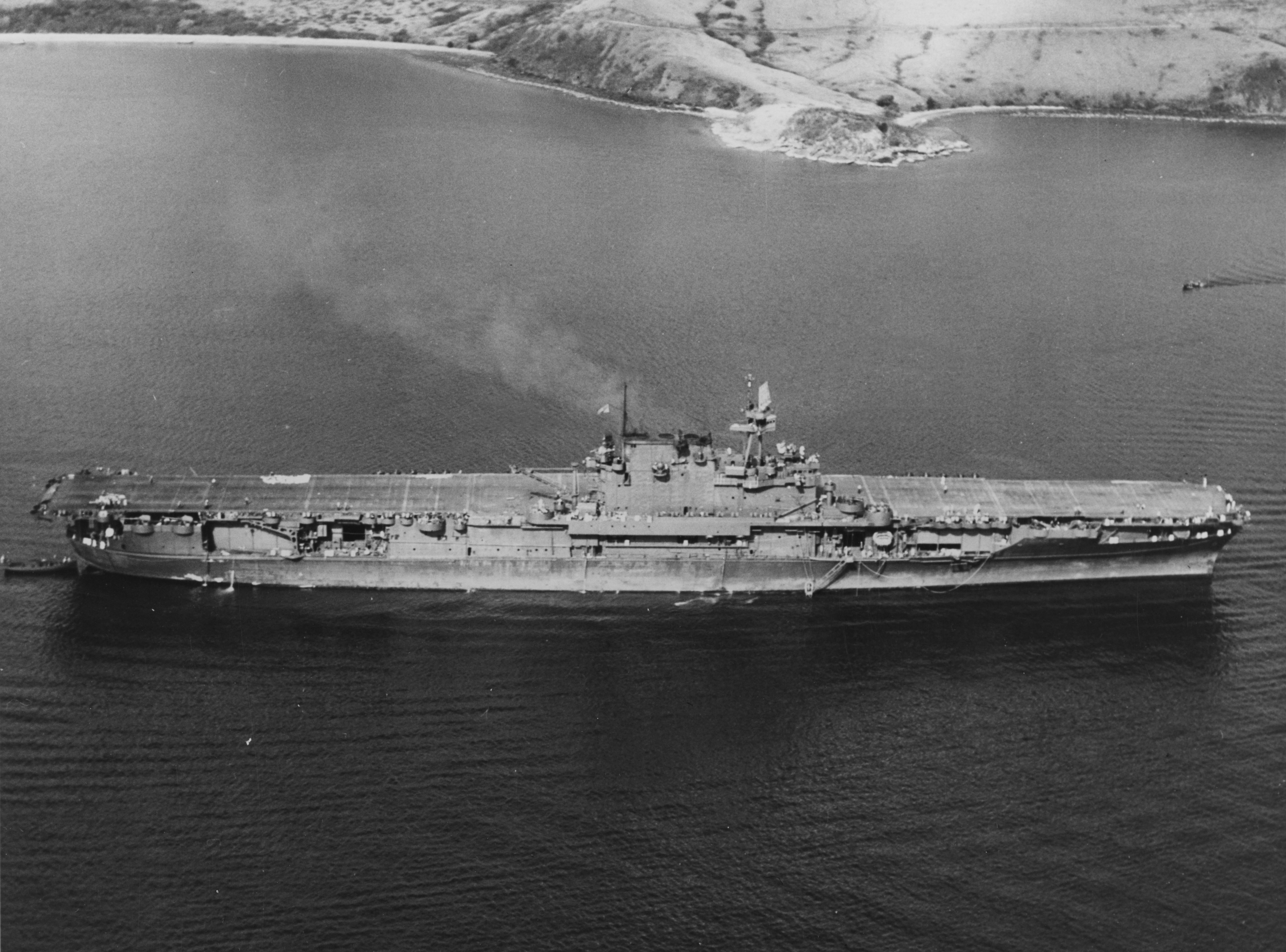
USS Enterprise (CV-6) at Nouméa, New Caledonia, 10 November 1942 undergoing emergency repairs by B Co. CB 3 that continued en route to the 1st Naval Battle of Guadalcanal Nov. 1942.

In December 1941, Rear Admiral Ben Moreell, Chief of BuDocks, recommended establishing Navy Construction Battalions and on the 28th requested authority to carry this out. On 5 January 1942, he got the go-ahead from the Navy's Bureau of Navigation to recruit construction tradesmen for three Naval Construction Battalions. When those three Battalions were formed the Seabees did not have a base of their own yet. So, upon leaving Navy boot, those men were sent to National Youth Administration camps in Illinois, New Jersey, New York or Virginia to receive military training from the Marine Corps. The 3rd began arriving at the "newly" opened Camp Rousseau mid-May 1942 as the first CB at Port Hueneme. From there the 3rd CB deployed by Company as Seabee detachments do today. An A Company detachment joined the Bobcats of Construction Detachment 1 on Bora Bora, B Company went to Nouméa, New Caledonia to build Cub 1, and C & D Companies went to Fiji.

A Co sent 2 officers and 100 men to Bora Bora to augment the Bobcats. In the fall of 1943 the Bobcats had completed their work and had received orders to join B Co at Nouméa. However, those orders changed redesignateing the Bobcats and A Co. as 3rd battalion 22nd Marines commanded by Colonel Ayers. At that time the remainder of A Co. (5 officers and 292 enlisted) was transferred to the Marines. Since neither the Bobcats nor A Co had received any advanced military training in the States the 22nd put them through USMC boot training in the field. When the Marines finished they took the Seabees back to Hawaii where the regiment received amphibious warfare training. With that completed the 3rd Battalion was tasked as shore party, engineers and demolitions men for the landings in the Marshalls. At Kwajalein, Roi-Namur, and Eniwetok 3rd Battalion was the assault Reserve. The 22nd Marines took part in the Battle of Eniwetok as an element of the 1st Marine Provisional Brigade. The 3rd Battalion was heavily involved in securing the island and had landed in the assaults on both Engebi and Parry Islands as well. However, at Eniwetok the Seabees were committed at 14:25 D-day to eliminate the Japanese on the western side of the island. The Army identifies them as "Marines" recording that they battled long into the night. At 0900 the next morning the Japanese launched a counterattack that reached the Seabee command post before being repulsed. All toll, the U.S.lost 37 while the Japanese lost 800 on Eniwetok. For its actions on Eniwetok the 22nd Marine Regiment received the Navy Unit Commendation. When the Marshall Islands operations were completed the 22nd was sent to Guadalcanal. There it learned that over 1800 men had contracted the slow developing tropical disease Filariasis from the Bora Bora jungles. It manifests as the dreaded Elephantiasis. With the military operations over the Bobcats and A company were released by the Marine Corps (totaling 2 officers and 225 enlisted). The 2 officers and 40 men were what remained of the original A Company, the balance was what remained of the Bobcats.

B Co On 30 October the USS Enterprise (CV-6) pulled into Nouméa after taking two hits and two near misses during the Battle of the Santa Cruz Islands and B Co. was tasked to help. The Big E was the only aircraft carrier remaining in the Pacific West of Pearl Harbor, but had bomb damage to the flight deck at the bow and just aft of the forward elevator. The 500-pounder that struck there split in two upon penetrating the flight deck. The smaller portion detonated on the hangar deck putting a 4' bulge in the flight deck measuring 30'x60'. The larger portion passed down to third deck blowing out bulkheads, killing the ships Repair Party Number 2 mustered below. A third bomb was a near miss, midships below the waterline, that broke ship frames 30, 31, and 34. The concussion cracked a cast iron after-bearing support on one of the ship's turbines. The jolt caused the fore-mast to rotate in its socket enough to disable all the electronics mounted on it. It also affected the midships elevator. The other 500 lb. miss was starboard below the waterline at elevator number 1. It caused rivet failure, ruptured an oil tank and flooded two more plus the machinery room for an ammunition elevator. That forced Damage control to flood additional compartments to restore trim. Upon docking in Noumea the damage assessment Officer off the repair ship USS Vestal told Adm. Halsey repairs would take 3 weeks. Halsey replied they had ten days and he would give them some Seabees to get it done. B Company put 75 Seabees aboard to effect emergency repairs with 40 men from the Vestal. On day eleven the repair crews remained aboard when Adm. Halsey ordered the Enterprise back to action for what would be the called the Battle of the Solomons. Underway to engage the enemy, the men of CB 3 focused on effecting repairs even into the battle. They had worked round-the-clock under the Enterprise's damage control officer. They even had had Nouméa harbor lit up during blackout to get the ship operational. The damage control officer wrote that on 11 November: "She made the open sea with her decks shaking and echoing to air hammers, with welders' arcs sparking.. without watertight integrity.. leaking oil.. and with her forward elevator still jammed." On 13 November the ship's Captain notified Halsey at SOPAC that "The emergency repairs accomplished by this skillful, well-trained, and enthusiastically energetic force have placed this vessel in condition for further action against the enemy". Those repairs enabled Enterprise aircraft to take part in the sinking of the Japanese battleship Hiei that day in the First Naval Battle of Guadalcanal. Over the next three days the Enterprise was involved in the sinking of another fifteen and damaging eight more. While it appeared that the forward elevator had been repaired the Ok to use it was not given until after the battle. It worked. Admiral Bull Halsey (Commander SOPAC Nouméa) knew how those Seabee repairs contributed to the battle's outcome. He sent a commendatory letter to the OIC of B Company, Lt. Quayle: "Your commander wishes to express to you and the men of the Construction Battalion serving under you, his appreciation for the services rendered by you in effecting emergency repairs during action against the enemy. The repairs were completed by these men with speed and efficiency. I hereby commend them for their willingness, zeal, and capability." The Enterprise returned to Nouméa on 16 November for the Seabees to complete the repairs. She departed again on 4 December. The Naval Battle of Guadalcanal was included in the Enterprise's Presidential Unit Citation The men off the USS Vestal and B Co. meet award protocol for eligibility: "they were physically present and participated in the action for which the Enterprise was cited." B Co. set up operations on Ile Nou upon arriving in Noumea. It was originally tasked with building a tank farm which was cancelled. War developments led to the components of Cub 1 being delivered to them instead of New Zealand. In addition to building the destroyer base they set up a pontoon assembly facility utilizing the labor of a Company of buffalo soldiers from the 24th Infantry Regiment. They also set up an aviation motor rebuild facility on Ile Nou.

Over the next two years a number of smaller detachments were sent to islands in both the Samoan and Fijian groups. In 1944, the battalion was reformed in New Caledonia and departed Nouméa on 22 May to return to Camp Parks, California where on 12 July it was ordered disbanded and then subsequently decommissioned on 16 August 1944.

=== Korean Era, MCB 3 ===
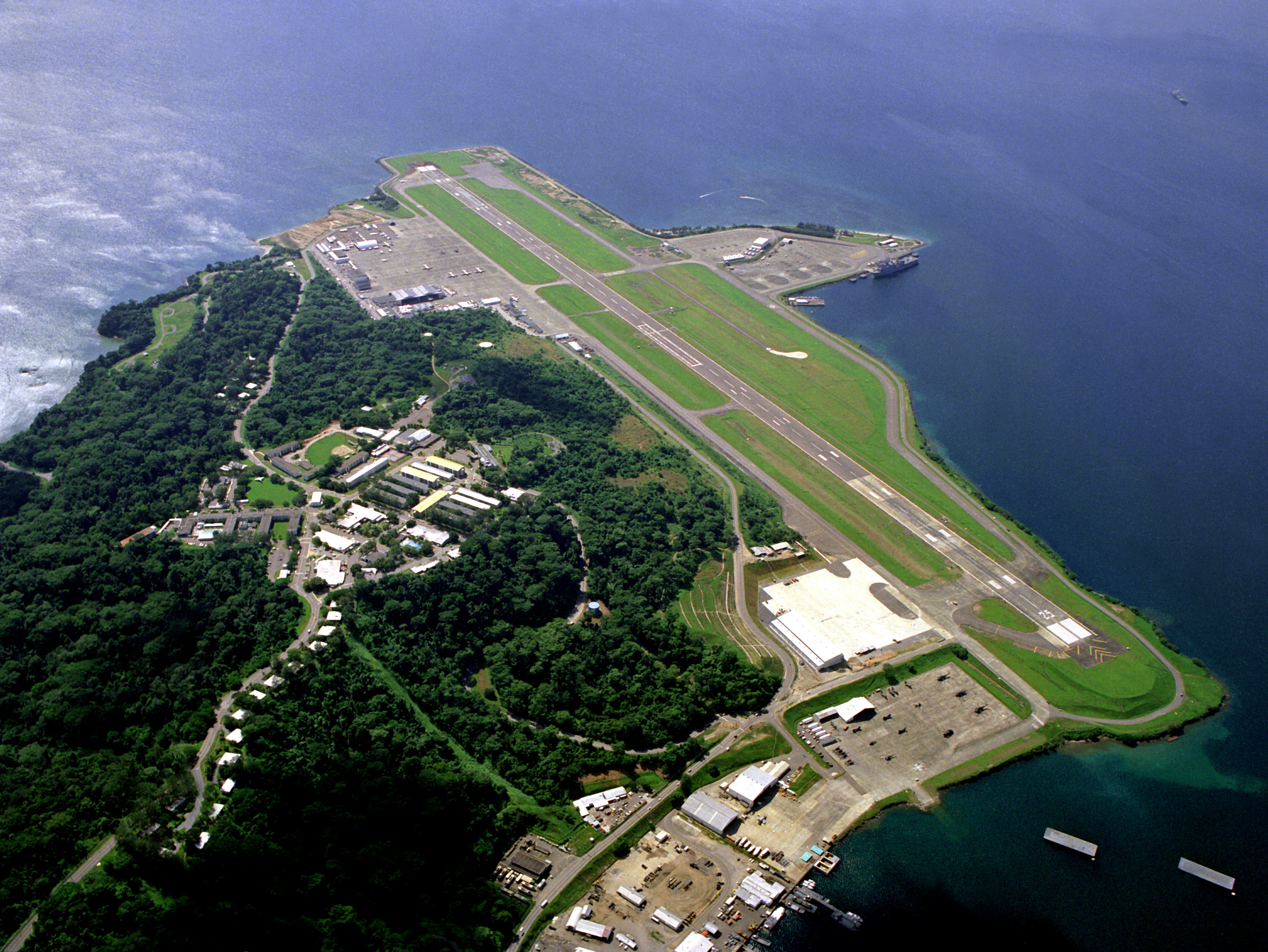
An aerial view of Cubi Point

The battalion was re-activated as MCB 3 on 15 July 1950 at Naval Construction Battalion Center Port Hueneme, California. In November the battalion's first deployment was top secret on Amchitka, in the Aleutians. The DOD wanted to know the suitability of the island for the nuclear tests of upcoming Project Windstorm. The battalion drilled 34 test holes to learn the hydrology and cratering potential of the geologic strata on the island.

On 2 October 1951, the battalion arrived in the Philippine Islands where it spent the next 5 1/2 years building Naval Air Station, Cubi Point. The first problem encountered was moving the fishing village of Banicain, which occupied a portion of the site for the new airfield. The town and its residents were moved to Olongapo, which became New Banicain. The former village site is now under 45 feet (14 m) of earth. The next, and biggest, issue was cutting a mountain in half and moving the material to fill in Subic Bay to create a 10,000 feet (3,000 m) long runway. CBs 2, 3, 5, 9 & 11 all blasted coral to fill a section of the bay as well as adjoining swampland. They removed trees as large as 150 feet (46 m) tall and 6 to 8 feet (1.8 to 2.4 m) in diameter from the construction site. It was one of the largest earthmoving projects in the world, equivalent to the building of the Panama Canal. The construction took five years and an estimated 20 million man-hours. The $100 million facility ($1.18 billion in 2025 dollars) was commissioned on 25 July 1956 and comprised an air station and an adjacent pier that was capable of docking the Navy's largest carriers.

The following four years were spent on Okinawa, Japan constructing Marine Corps Air Facility Futenma. The battalion's next major construction job was an airstrip at Nakhon Phanom, Thailand, after which MCB 3 served on Okinawa and Guam.

=== Vietnam War, MCB 3 ===
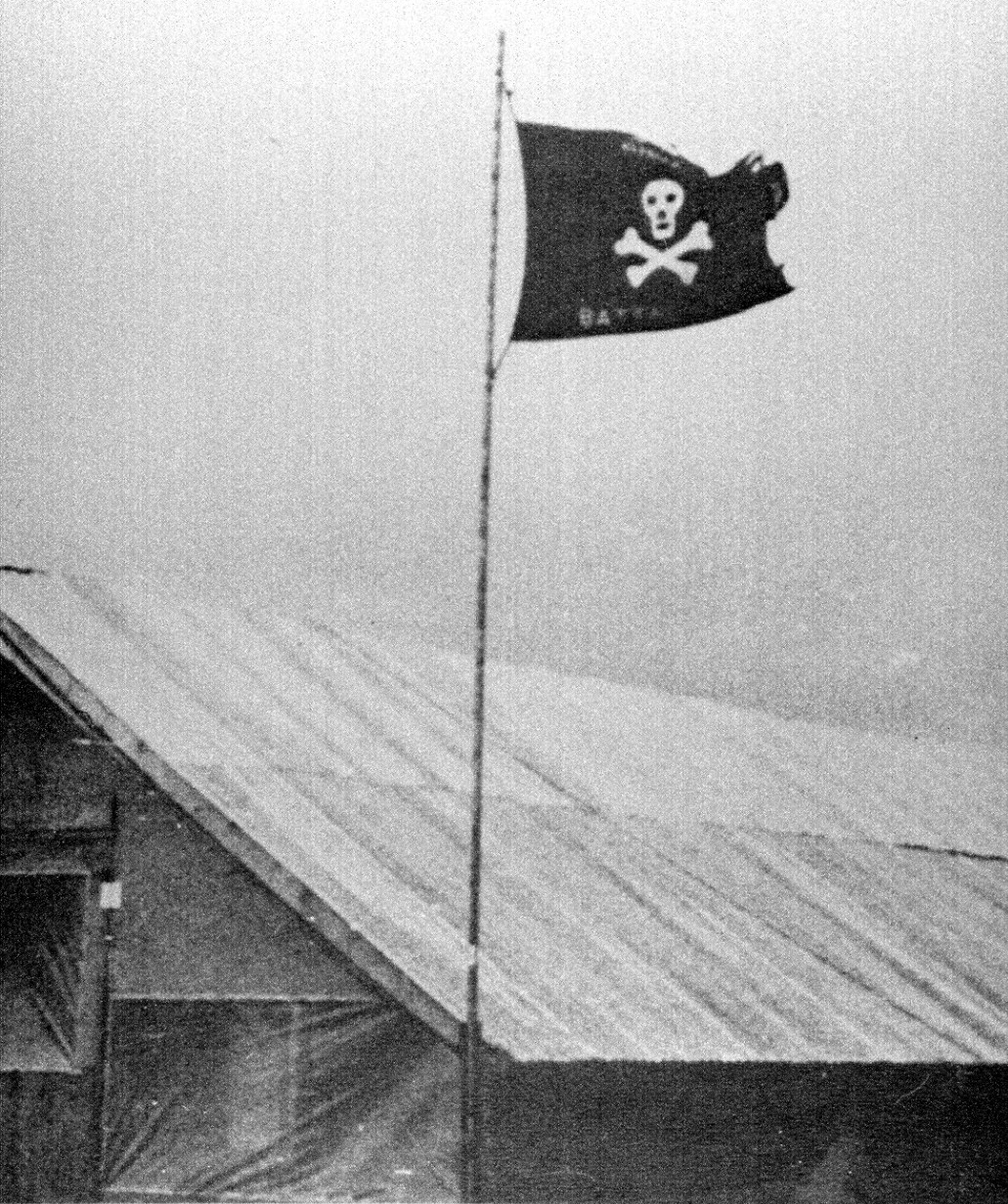
Ghost Battalion colors at Quảng Trị. The Seabees had 11,000 graves to move in order to construct that airfield. (USN)

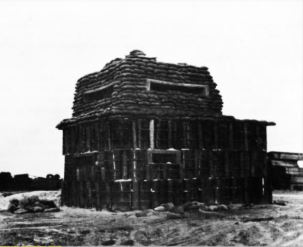
MCB 3 bunker at Gia Le 1967-68(Seabee Museum)

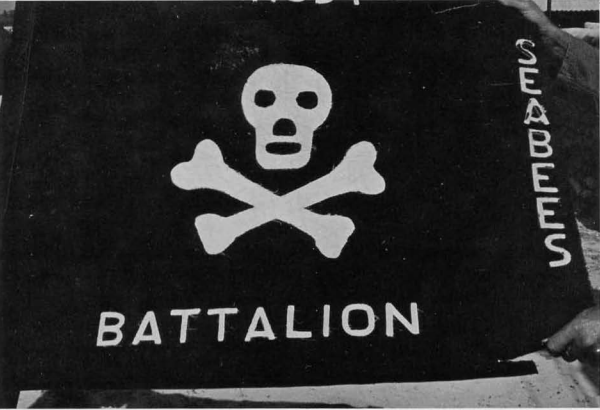
The Ghost Battalion was commanded by Cmdr. R.L. Foley who was TAD from MCB 3. He received the Legion of Merit with V for combat for the job he did. (USN)

In May 1965 MCB 3 made its first of three visits to Da Nang, Vietnam constructing more than 500 facilities for the Marine Corps. One of the projects was a tough road job from the upper peak to the lower peak at the Monkey Mountain Facility. They also began the task on creating a site on the lower peak for a missile battery. The peak started out as completely unusable and needed to be blasted and leveled to create several usable acres which was completed by the relief battalion. MCB 3's second and third tours took them to Chu Lai and Gia Le. On 20 September 1965, USMC base Camp Hansen on Okinawa was commissioned after CBs 3, 9, and 11 completed the repurposing of Chimu Airfield for the Marines. In 1966 NMCB- 3 received their First Battle "E", and while in Chu Lai, the battalion was named Pacific Fleet "Best of Type" on 11 September 1966 by Rear Admiral W. M. Heaman, Commander Construction Battalions.

In the summer of 1967, MCB 3 Deployed to Phu Bai to support projects for the Third Marine Division. This began with improvements to the air facility at MAG (Marine Air Group) 36. Following that was the development of a complete rock quarry, north of Phu Bai. Part of the battalion started construction of Camp Eagle in support of the 101st Airborne, while a detachment built a 5,000,000 gallon P.O.L. facility on Tan My island, east of the Imperial City of Huế. During this deployment an urgent airfield was needed at Quảng Trị. The project was designated "top secret", site "X", and to be completed in under 45 days. MCBs 1, 3, 4, 7, 10, 11, 74, 121, and 133 all sent detachments of men and equipment to get the job done. Those detachments dubbed themselves the "Ghost Battalion" and chose the Jolly Roger for the battalion's colors. MCB 3's commanding officer, Cmdr. R.L Foley was posted TAD as commander of the Ghost Battalion and would receive the Legion of Merit Medal with Combat V for the job he did. At the same time MCB- 3 built a complete base surrounding their own camp that became Gia Le combat base. It was finished just in time to withstand the 1968 Tet Offensive and the Battle of Hue City. MCB 8 relieved MCB 3 in January 1968 and while deployed with the Marines in Gia Le, assisted their adjacent units with all types of construction, along with general engineering support as well as mortar support. This effort earned the "Better than Best" a Presidential Unit Citation from President Richard Nixon upon their return to the States. In 1968 the Marine Corps requested that the Seabees make a name change from MCB as the Marine Corps was using MCB for Marine Corps Base, so the Navy created the NMCBs.

In July 1968, NMCB 3 again deployed to Da Nang, Vietnam. They were first assigned to Camp Faulkner, to the south of the city, near Marble Mountain and next to the NSA (Naval Support Activity) Hospital. The battalion worked on "Igloo" bunkers at ASP-1 (Ammo Supply Point). NMCB 3 then became the first Seabee battalion to relocate while deployed to Vietnam when they moved north of the city to Camp Haskins South on Red Beach. While stationed at their new camp, NMCB 3 worked on building the NSA Bridge Cargo Ramp east of Da Nang city, to allow the offloading of LSTs. They also replaced the runway and turn-arounds with new matting at the An Hoa Marine combat base, made road improvements on highway 1 in the Hải Vân Pass, north of Da Nang and built the "Golden Gate Bridge" to replace the "Liberty Bridge", which had been destroyed several times, on "Liberty Road" between Da Nang and An Hoa.

After preparing for a 5th deployment to Vietnam in August 1969, the battalion orders were changed and NMCB 3 was deployed to Camp Kinzer (present-day Camp Shields), Okinawa. While at Camp Kinzer, the battalion made numerous improvements to the camp itself, including the construction of a new subsistence building, barracks and roads. NMCB 3 also conducted major excavating projects at Marine Corp Air Station Futenma, which included baseball fields and a stadium.

In October 1970, NMCB 3 again deployed to Camp Haskins South, on route one, north of Da Nang for a 5th deployment to Vietnam.

=== Seabee teams ===
- 0301 Bon Sar Pa, Jul 63 .. Special Forces Air strip
- 0301 Bu Prang, Nov 63 ... Special Forces Air strip
- 0301 Ban Don, Nov 63
- 0301 Ban Me Thuot, Jan 64
- 0302 Tan Son Nhut, Jul 63
- 0302 Plei Mrong, Jul 63 ... Special Forces Camp
- 0302 Polei Krong, Aug 63. Special Forces Air strip
- 0302 Plei Kly, Sep 63 ........ Special Forces Camp
- 0302 Plei Me, Oct 63 ........ Special Forces Camp
- 0302 Pleiku, Nov 63
- 0302 Plei Ta Nangle, Dec 63
- MMT #1 Hoc Mon, Mar 64 (well drilling team 1)
- 0307 Dran, Dec 67
- 0307 Tan Son Nhut Apr 67
- 0308 Thu Duc, Apr 67
- 0309 Thoai Son, Jun 67
- 0309 Long Xuyen, Jul 67
- 0310 Long Xuyen, Aug 68
- 0310 Bac Lieu, Nov 68
- 0311 Can Tho, Aug 68
- 0312 Ben Tre, Aug 69
- 0313 Cao Lanh, Sep 69
- 0318 Ben Tre, Dec 70
- 0319 Xuan Loc, Nov 70
- 0321 Kam Tan, Jan 72
- Commander Naval Construction Battalion U.S. Pacific Fleet, Tân Sơn Nhất, Republic of Vietnam, Completion Report 1963–1972. Seabee Teams

MEDCAP A component of the Civic Action Program was the Medical Civic Action Program or MEDCAP. In 1967 MCB3's medical personal would make visits twice a week to the villages and hamlets around Hue and Phu Bai. The team consisted of a Doctor, Dentist and several corpsmen.

=== Cold War, NMCB 3 ===
In November 1971 NMCB 3 was deployed to Guam to start construction of a new Seabee camp. The battalion lived up to its "Better Than Best" motto by constructing enough permanent facilities to have the dedication of Camp Covington on 4 May 1972.

In October 1971, MCB-3 advance party arrived in Guam, equipment operators and builders were detached to Andersen Air Force Base, Guam under direction of Admiral Morrison, COMNAVMAR by the request of the Commander of Andersen Air Force Base; to build 76 B-52 pads in support of the Vietnam War. Working 24/7 mission was completed in six months.

The battalion was deployed to Roosevelt Roads Naval Station in Puerto Rico early in 1974 to construct barracks and other base improvements.

In February 1975 the battalion deployed to Diego Garcia, a British territory in the Indian Ocean. There, NMCB 3 contributed to the massive NCF construction effort.

NMCB 3 was named "Best of Type" in 1976 and winner of the Peltier Award for providing emergency assistance to all military commands on Guam. The battalion did so while maintaining its projects' timelines in the aftermath of Super-Typhoon Pamela.

From April 1977 to August 1982, the battalion was divided into two "teams" (Blue and Gold) which rotated between Port Hueneme and Camp Shields, Okinawa. The battalion was named "Best of Type" and awarded the Battle "E" in 1978, 1980 and 1981.

Upon returning to homeport from their third rotation of the "Split Concept" (January 1980), Blue Team was tasked to nearby NAWC Point Mugu where they assisted in flood disaster recovery efforts.

The following homeport of 1981, NMCB 3's Iwakuni Det Blue 4 was assigned to "Project Rimstone" as the night crew, (subsidizing the 31st NCR), located in Santa Barbara, the Det commuted nightly, 140 miles (230 km) from CBC Pt Hueneme, to President Ronald Reagan's ranch. Completing the project on time, the Seabees of this detail received Presidential letters of Commendation, Presented by J.M. Dougherty Commanding Officer of NMCB 3, on 22 October 1982.

In March 1983 the reunited Battalion deployed for the first time to Camp Mitchell, Naval Station Rota, Spain where it was again named "Best of Type" in the Pacific Fleet. In 1986 NMCB 3 deployed to Guadalcanal to aid the clean-up of Typhoon Namu. For this they received the Peltier award along with the Humanitarian service medal.

From 1983 to 1989 the battalion made routine deployments to the European and Pacific Theaters and was named "Best of Type" in the Pacific Fleet for FY 1987.

In October 1989, while completing a homeport field exercise, the battalion deployed its Air Detachment from Fort Hunter Liggett, California, to the San Francisco Bay area to provide earthquake recovery assistance. The Air Detachment personnel repaired severely damaged utilities at Naval Air Station Alameda and Naval Station Treasure Island.

=== The 1990s ===
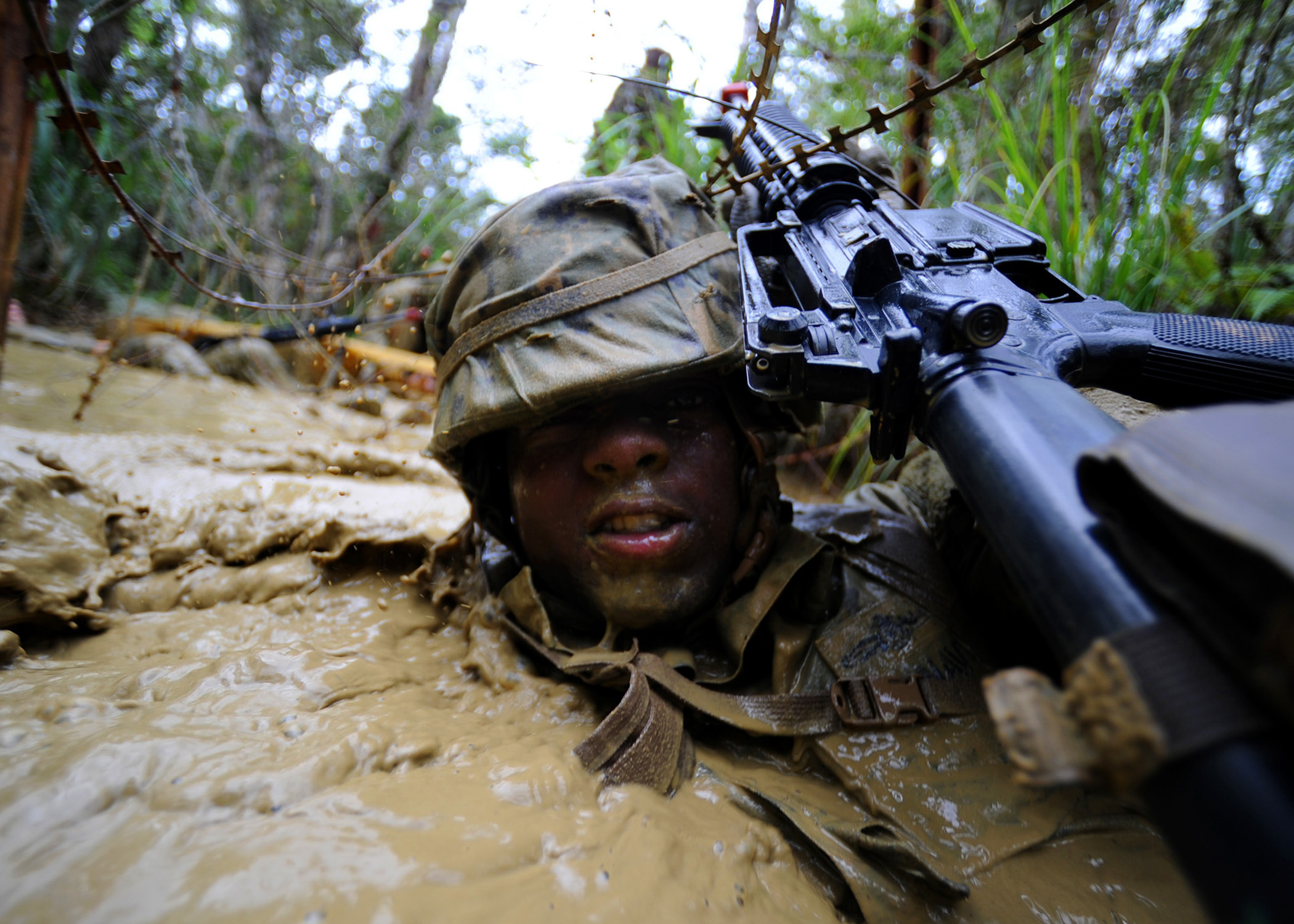
130922-N-VN372-102 (9949417156) CE2 Dwayne Watson uses his weapon to clear razor wire during an endurance course 22 September 2013, at the Marine Corps Jungle Warfare Training Center at Camp Gonslaves, Japan. NMCB-3 had a little more than a platoon participate the eight-day training.

In January 1990, NMCB 3 returned to Rota. The Air Detachment was dispatched for disaster recovery operations in North Africa where they repaired flood-damaged rail lines, significantly aiding in Tunisia's economic recovery.

In March 1991, NMCB 3 deployed to Guam and provided Federal Emergency Management Agency (FEMA) with Typhoon Owen disaster recovery assistance in Yap. NMCB 3 also cleared runways and repaired utilities at Naval Air Station Cubi Point in support of Operation Fiery Vigil following the eruption of Mount Pinatubo.

NMCB 3 returned to Guam in July 1993, sending a Civil Action Team to Palau and a short-term detail to Saipan to help make preparations for the 50th anniversary of World War II. Five's Seabees repaired facilities, utilities and schools following the worst earthquake to shake Guam in more than a century, measuring 8.2 on the Richter Scale.

In September 1994, NMCB 3 embarked upon a 14-country, four-continent deployment. The battalion supported the United Nations protection force operation "Provide Promise" by maintaining the U.S. Hospital at Zagreb, Croatia. It also installed surveillance equipment in Baghdad, Iraq.

In November 1995, NMCB 3 deployed details to stateside U.S. military installations for the first time. It also ended a chapter in Seabee construction by completing projects on Diego Garcia.

In January 1997, the battalion's main body returned to Camp Mitchell, Rota, Spain. NMCB 3 Bees broke new ground in deploying to two Baltic locations new to Seabees, Estonia and Uzbekistan. There they provided construction support during "Operation Baltic Castle and a U.S. Humanitarian Aid Program (HAP) Operation Provide Hope.

On 23 April 1998, NMCB 3 participated in the exercise Cooperation Afloat Readiness and Training (CARAT '98). This was a first-time participation for Seabees in a combined fleet and multi-national exercise of this type.

In Rayong, Thailand, NMCB 3 completed the construction of a second story addition to the Camillian Social Center. The center provides a place for Aids victims during their last days. The battalion had the opportunity to show exactly how mobile they are when they received a call to action in 1998. A modified Air Detachment quickly deployed to Nairobi, Kenya, in support of Operation Resolute Response. The detachment assisted in disaster relief efforts, structural repair and the recovery of evidence and classified material following the U.S. embassy bombing.

On 15 May 1999, NMCB 3 headed to Rota, Spain where shortly after arriving on station, the battalion was called into action in support of Joint Task Force, Shining Hope. NMCB 3 repaired roads in Northern Albania that were weakened by the steady flow of more than 800,000 Albanian refugees from Kosovo and years of neglect.

Shortly after Detachment Albania left, the mission changed and the battalion sent an advanced party of 43 personnel into Kosovo. Within two weeks, the battalion integrated Detail Albanian's 150 personnel with an additional 184 Seabees from Camp Mitchell. The mission was to build 64 Davidson style Southeast Asia Huts (SEAhuts) in 90 days for an Army base camp at Camp Monteith, Gnjilane, Kosovo. Maintaining 24-hour operations for nearly two months, THREE stayed on schedule and completed the initial tasking in 89 days. By the time the battalion departed for homeport in December 1999, they had built more than 80 SEAhuts and constructed more than 40 acres (16 ha) of hardstand.

In December 1999, the battalion returned home after a successful deployment that once again earned them the "Best of Type" award for the Pacific Fleet and the right to wear the coveted Battle "E". They were also awarded the Navy Unit Commendation Medal for their work during the 1999 Pacific Deployment.

In July 2000 saw the battalion sent to Guam on a Pacific Deployment. The battalion immediately tasked two Detachments for Training: one to the Seychelles to dismantle three ray domes, the other to Indonesia to build a road and repair a schoolhouse.

=== Post 9-11 ===
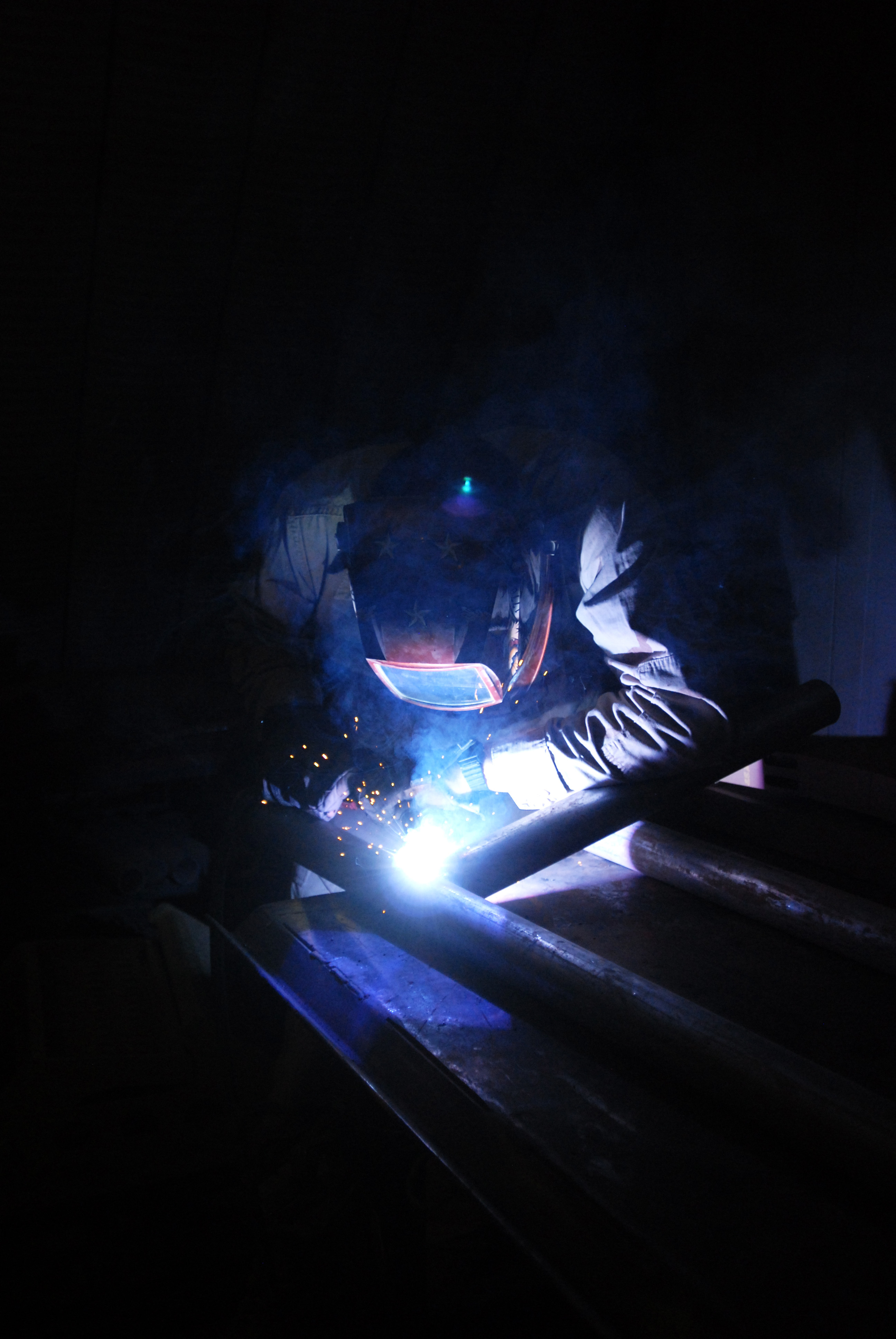
SWCN Sanders, of NMCB 3, welds tubular steel for a gate at Kandahar Air Field, Afghanistan, December 2010. His detachment does camp maintenance for Special Operations Task Force – South.

After 9/11 in 2001, NMCB 3 deployed to sites on three continents. The main body went to Rota, Spain. Detachments went to Thurmont, MD; Tidewater, VA; Naples; Sigonella; Souda Bay; the Republic of Georgia; Stuttgart, Germany; and Gabon, Africa.

With Camp Mitchell in Force Protection, Condition Delta, NMCB 3 deployed an air-Det there in December 2001. In support of Operation Enduring Freedom they built an Al Qaeda detention facility at Camp X-ray. The Det also constructed 65 SEAhuts for JTF 160 security forces and cleared a site to construct a 160-bed Fleet Hospital.

In December 2002, NMCB 3 deployed to Camp Shields Okinawa with dets at 14 sites across the pacific and Southwest Asia. Despite changes in deployment schedules and preparations for Operation Enduring Freedom and with Operation Iraqi Freedom, NMCB 3 met all operational goals.

The Okinawa deployment was followed by more support tasking for both "Operation Enduring Freedom" and "Operation Iraqi Freedom II". In April 2004 a new Pacific deployment began. The battalion was made the lead in Task Force Sierra, a construction task force supporting several joint special operations commands. Detachments in support of OEF were in both the CENTCOM AO and the PACOM AO. In all, NMCB 3 had personnel at 36 different locations. The battalion had two main body sites in Guam and Iraq with 8 primary detachment sites.

July 2005 saw the unit returned to Iraq with 9 detachments in country. In addition Three had detachments to the Horn of Africa, Souda Bay, Guantanamo Bay, Andros Island, Bahamas, Rota, Spain, Bahrain, and the Setchelles. NMCB 3 was the only CB to be tasked to provide 6 Convoy Security Teams (CST) while providing over 11,000 man-days of construction support to the II Marine Expeditionary Force (II MEF). NMCB 3'S CSTs safely executed more than 130 successful convoy missions resulting in 17 combat action ribbon awards.

In November 2005, NMCB 3 was relieved by 133 in Fallujah, Iraq. The unit redeployed to Kuwait to set up main body operations in support of Combined Forces Land Component Command (CFLCC) and Area Support Group, Kuwait. The new main body deployment site was completely undeveloped. Integrating with NMCB 3 were over 145 personnel from NMCB 21 and 139 personnel from the Army's 63rd Construction Support Element. The Seabees worked with the Army to develop a master plan for what would become a CB main body deployment site for almost five years. Prior to returning home in early 2006, NMCB 3 completed over 20,000-man days of tasking on 58 projects for the CFLCC mission.

A deployment to the Far East began December 2006. The main body went to Camp Shields, Okinawa, with detachments to Atsugi, Iwakuni, Sasebo, Fuji and Yokosuka, Japan, Camp Pendleton and San Clemente Island, Chinhae, Korea and Diego Garcia. Additionally, a short-fused detail was stood up to support Special Operations Forces for Operation Enduring Freedom in Afghanistan. During the deployment, NMCB 3 aided the DOD's civil military operations focus with five civic action training detachments: three in the Philippines and one each in Korea and Thailand.

April 2008 saw the battalion return to Iraq and Afghanistan in support of the First Marine Expeditionary Force (I MEF). They assumed control of Task Force Sierra for a second time. The battalion supported I MEF as they pressed the remnants of Al Qaida and stood up the fledgling Iraq Security Forces to take control of that country's defenses. Task Force Sierra again supported the tip of Security Forces to take control of that country's defenses. Task Force Sierra again supported the American effort to take out or capture Al Qaida and Taliban insurgent leaders. The battalion racked up 72,000 man-days of construction supporting OIF and OEF while deployed.

After an abbreviated homeport, the battalion became the first Main Body to deploy to Naval Station Rota, Spain since 2005. After relieving NMCB 11 in August they reopened and improved Camp Mitchell and Naval Station Rota infrastructure. Civic action Detachments were sent to Romania, Bulgaria, Croatia and Serbia to provide humanitarian aid in these Eastern European countries. Another 300 Seabees spread out across Africa drilling waterwells, renovating schools, training host national militaries and worked civic action Liberia, Cameroon, Djibouti, Kenya, Comoros and Uganda.

From November 2010 to June 2011 NMCB THREE completed a deployment to Afghanistan where they supported US and Coalition forces spread across more than 30 different locations throughout Afghanistan. Key efforts included the completion of 110 tactical infrastructure projects, ranging from combat outpost builds to route construction, in support of I and II MEF, Special Operations Forces, and Task Force Helmand, a British Led Task Force. THREE's efforts contributed to improved counterinsurgency operations.

From Feb-Aug 2012 NMCB THREE completed a deployment to Europe and Africa in support of EUCOM and AFRICOM. The battalion had dets in 13 countries conducting HCA and ERC construction projects. The task was to sustain and improve international relationships with partner countries. They included: Djibouti, Uganda, Ethiopia, Kenya, Spain, Italy, Croatia, Bosnia, Morocco, Togo, Ghana, and Liberia.

== Awards: unit, campaign, service ==
NMCB 3 Unit Awards listed at the office of the Chief on Naval Operations

- Presidential Unit Citation for the USS Enterprise B Company 75 man detachment
- Navy Unit Commendation for the 22nd Marine Regiment A Company as 3rd Battalion 22nd Marines
- Asiatic–Pacific Campaign Medal
- World War II Victory Medal
- Republic of Vietnam Civil Actions Medal Unit Citation
- Republic of Vietnam Gallantry Cross with Palm Unit Award
- Vietnam Campaign Medal service ribbon with 60– Device : - 3 awards
- Vietnam Service Medal: - 3 awards
- National Defense Service Medal Vietnam,
- National Defense Service Medal Desert Storm, and War on Terror
- Chief of Naval Operations Letter of Commendation 2001
- Iraq Campaign Medal (2003–2008)
- Afghanistan Campaign Medal
- Navy "E" Ribbon : – U.S. Atlantic Fleet Battle "E" 13 times.
- Peltier Award: - 3 times.

== See also ==
- Admiral Ben Moreell
- Amphibious Construction Battalion 1 (ACB-1)
- Amphibious Construction Battalion 2 (ACB-2)
- Civil Engineer Corps United States Navy
- Naval Construction Battalion
- Naval Amphibious Base Little Creek
- Naval Amphibious Base Coronado
- Naval Construction Battalion Center (Gulfport, Mississippi)
- Naval Construction Battalion Center Port Hueneme
- Naval Mobile Construction Battalion 1
- Naval Mobile Construction Battalion 4
- Naval Mobile Construction Battalion 5
- Naval Mobile Construction Battalion 11
- Naval Mobile Construction Battalion 133
- Seabees in World War II
- Seabee
- Underwater Construction Teams
