= Dran =

Dran is a surname. Notable people with the surname include:

- André Dran (1924–2014), French tenor
- Damon Dran, fictional character
- Henri François Le Dran (1685–1770), French surgeon
- Frederick Dran

== See also ==
- Glaub dran, 1993 album by Lessmann/Ziller
