= Naval Air Station Cubi Point =

Naval Air Station Cubi Point Naval Base Subic Bay
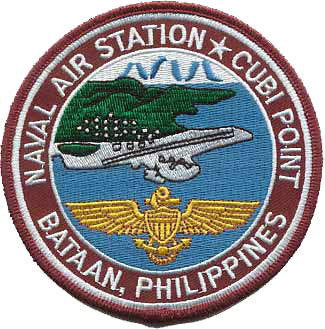
- IATA: NCP; ICAO: RPLB

Summary
- Airport type: Naval Air Station
- Operator: United States Navy
- Location: Bataan, Philippines
- Closed: November 1992
- Built: October 2, 1951
- Commander: n/a
- Elevation AMSL: 64 ft / 19 m
- Coordinates: 14°47′40.02″N 120°16′16.91″E
- Interactive map of Naval Air Station Cubi Point; Naval Base Subic Bay

Runways
Direction	Length		Surface
Direction	ft	m	Surface
07L/25R	9,003	2,728	Asphalt

U.S. Naval Air Station Cubi Point (IATA: NCP, ICAO: RPLB) was a United States Navy aerial facility located at the edge of Naval Base Subic Bay and abutting the Bataan Peninsula in the Philippines.

When the base closed in November 1992, the air station became Subic Bay International Airport and is still operating today. However, the IATA airport code was changed from NCP to SFS, as part of the transition.

== Background ==
During the Korean War, Admiral Arthur W. Radford, Commander-in-Chief, U.S. Pacific Fleet saw the need for a naval air station at Cubi Point. It was a rugged and jungle-covered finger of land 3 miles (4.8 km) from Subic Naval Base. Radford believed the air station would be a vital link for the U.S. Navy in the Philippines.

In spite of the magnitude of the job and the tremendous difficulties the construction involved, the project was approved by The Pentagon. Civilian contractors were initially contracted to fulfill the project, but after seeing the forbidding Zambales Mountains and the maze of jungle at Cubi Point, they claimed it could not be done. The Navy's Seabees were then given the project in 1951. The first Seabees to arrive were MCB-3 on October 2, 1951; the second, MCB-5, arrived on November 5, 1951; the third, MCB-2 arrived early in 1952. MCBs 9 and 11 followed later.

The first problem encountered was moving the fishing village of Banicain, which occupied a portion of the site for the new airfield. The town and its residents were moved to Olongapo, which became New Banicain. The former village of Banicain is now under 45 feet (14 m) of earth.

The next, and biggest, issue was cutting a mountain in half and moving soil to fill in Subic Bay and create a 10,000-foot-long (3,000 m) runway. The Seabees blasted coral to fill a section of Subic Bay, filled swampland, removed trees as large as 150 feet (46 m) tall and 6 to 8 feet (1.8 to 2.4 m) in diameter. It was one of the largest earthmoving projects in the world, equivalent to the construction of the Panama Canal. The construction project took five years and an estimated 20 million man-hours.

The $100-million facility (equivalent to $881 million in 2024) was commissioned on July 25, 1956, and comprised an air station and an adjacent pier that was capable of docking the Navy's largest carriers. On December 21, 1972, Naval Air Station Cubi Point was renamed to honor Admiral Arthur W. Radford. Radford had the unusual honor of personally dedicating the facility. A plaque memorializing the occasion reads:

Dedicated in honor of Admiral Arthur W. Radford, whose foresight in founding U.S. Naval Air Station Cubi Point has enabled the United States Navy to provide invaluable support to the Seventh Fleet and to carry out its obligations under the Philippines-United States Mutual Defense Treaty.

== Operations ==
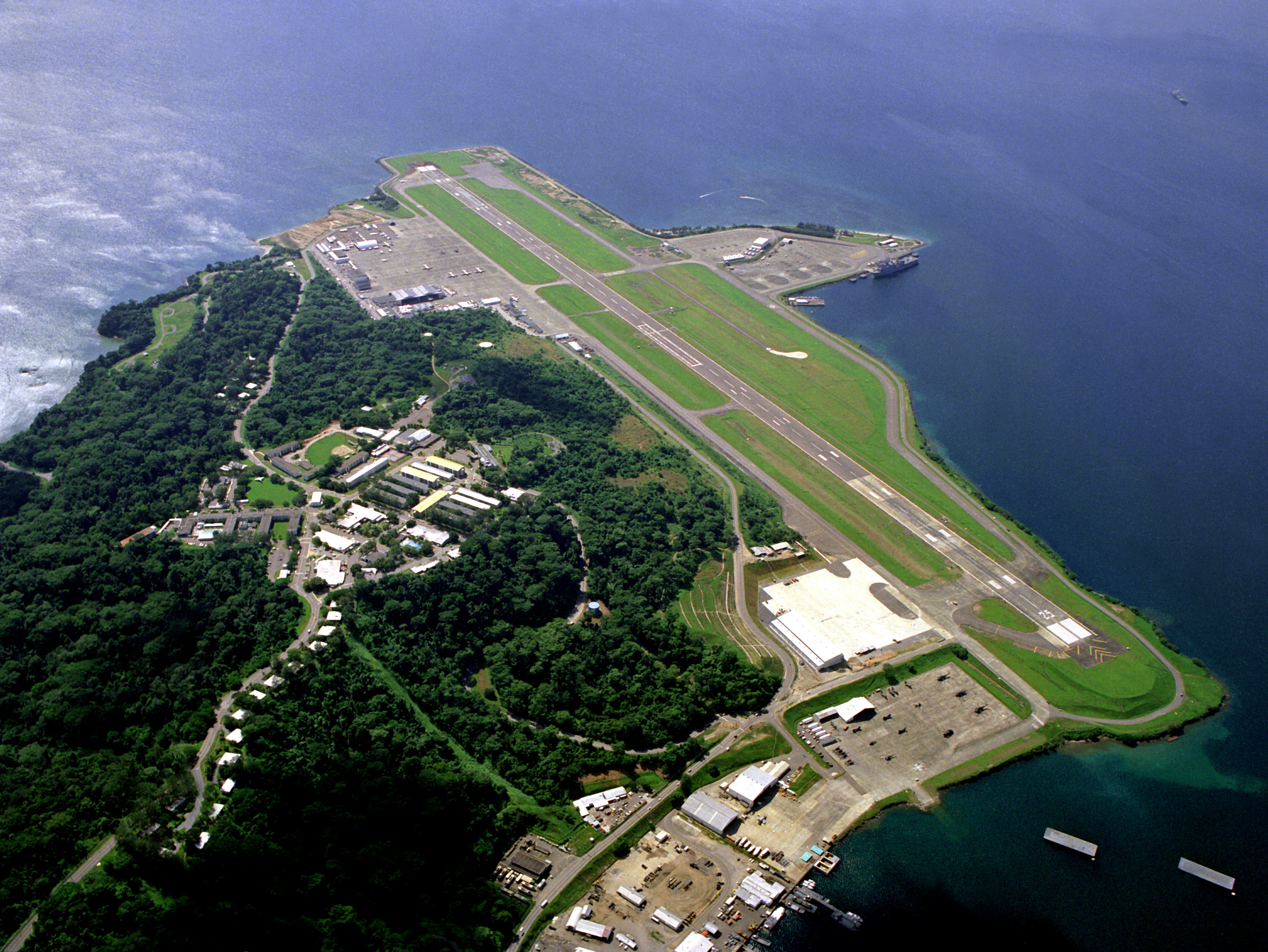
An aerial view of Cubi Point

Eventually, NAS Cubi Point served as the primary maintenance, repair and supply center for the 400 carrier-based aircraft of the Seventh Fleet's carrier force. During the Vietnam War, its jet engine shop turned out two jet engines per day to keep pace with demand.

NAS Cubi Point and Naval Base Subic Bay were also prominently used during Operations Desert Storm and Desert Shield.

On June 15, 1991, Mount Pinatubo, only 20 miles (32 km) from Subic Bay, erupted and blanketed the facility in ash 1 foot (30 cm) deep. Dependents were evacuated and the Navy began an intense clean-up effort to return the station to normal operations. Within two weeks, they returned the station back to limited operations. Within four weeks, the Navy had restored almost all services to most of the family housing. By September, most dependents had returned to Subic Bay and Cubi Point, but in the same month the Senate of the Philippines voted to require the United States to withdraw from all of its facilities in the Philippines. The withdrawal was completed in November 1992 and shortly after NAS Cubi Point became Cubi Point International Airport, later renamed Subic Bay International Airport. Upon closure, the vast collection of squadron memorabilia displayed in the Cubi Point Officers' Club was shipped to the National Museum of Naval Aviation at NAS Pensacola, Florida, and now forms the decor of the Cubi Bar Café, which opened in 1996 as the museum's restaurant.

== Cubi Point O' Club ==
The Cubi Point Officers Club sat on a hill above the Naval Air Station. Before Naval Air Station Cubi Point was turned over to the Philippine government, the remaining officers of the US Navy dismantled the bar and shipped its parts to the National Naval Aviation Museum in Pensacola, Florida.

In November 1996, the Philippines hosted the Asia Pacific Economic Cooperation (APEC). The former O' Club served as a summit hall.

== Accidents and incidents ==
- 5 December 1971: P-3A Orion #152151 had 2 engines explode shortly after takeoff and ditched. 1 of the 16 occupants was killed.
- 31 October 1972: KA-6D Intruder #151809 attached to Attack Squadron (VA) 196 on USS Enterprise (CVN-65) stalled and crashed on take-off into Subic Bay, both crew members killed.
- 2 November 1978: S-3A Viking 160590 crashed at night on Mount Slanging, two miles southwest of the Cubi Point Naval Air Station, having had taken off from the Cubi airfield seven minutes before on a training flight.
- 26 June 1979: P-3B #154596 lost power to 2 engines after takeoff and crashed while attempting to return to land. 5 of the 15 occupants were killed.
- 29 January 1989: A-6E Intruder BuNo. 162189/'NF 502' of Attack Squadron (VA) 115 "Eagles" based aboard the USS Midway (CV-41). Substantially damaged January 29, 1989 at NAS Cubi Point, Subic Bay, Philippines. A fire erupted on the right side of the aircraft during refuelling in the NAS Cubi Point fuel pits ["hot-pits"]. Fuel nozzle didn't seal correctly. It was attached, but when they pressurized it, jet fuel went down the intake. (Unlike EA-6B Prowlers, the pilots of A-6E Intruders kept both engines turning during refuelling). Of the two crew, the pilot, LCDR Dan “Aldo” Wendling egressed on ground. The Bombardier/Navigator, Jay "Tank" Cook ejected but did not survive due to tailwinds and being out of the seat operating envelope.

== See also ==
- U.S. Naval Base Subic Bay
- U.S. Naval Station Sangley Point
- Subic Bay International Airport
- Military History of the Philippines
- Military History of the United States
