= Tallahassee International Airport =

Airport in Florida, U.S.

- Ivan Munroe Terminal
- IATA: TLH; ICAO: KTLH; FAA LID: TLH; WMO: 72214

Summary
- Airport type: Public
- Owner: City of Tallahassee
- Serves: Tallahassee metropolitan area
- Location: Tallahassee, Florida, U.S.
- Built: March 29, 1961
- Time zone: EST/EDT (UTC-5 / UTC-4)
- Elevation AMSL: 81 ft (25 m)
- Coordinates: 30°23′48″N 084°21′01″W
- Website: flytallahassee.com

Maps
- FAA airport diagram
- Interactive map of Tallahassee International Airport

Runways
Direction	Length		Surface
Direction	ft	m	Surface
09/27	8,000	2,438	Asphalt
18/36	7,000	2,134	Asphalt

Statistics (2025)
- Total enplanements: 453,400
- Total deplanements: 447,953
- Total passengers: 901,353 ▼6.90%
- Source: Federal Aviation Administration

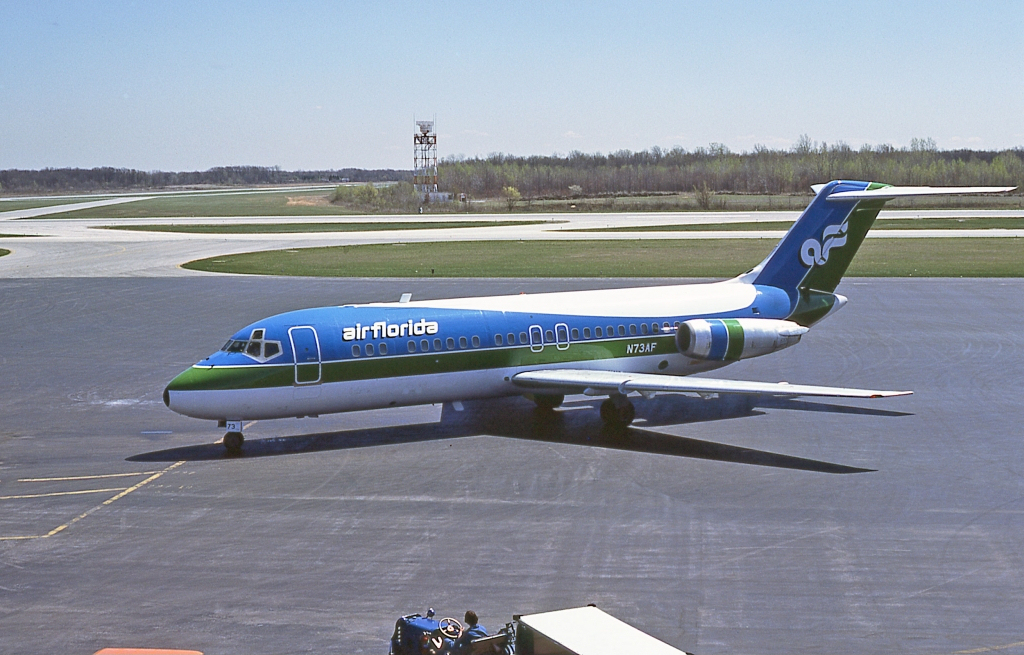
Air Florida DC-9 parked at Tallahassee Airport

Tallahassee International Airport (IATA: TLH, ICAO: KTLH, FAA LID: TLH) is a public airport located about 5 miles (8 km) southwest of downtown Tallahassee in Leon County, Florida, United States. Owned and operated by the City of Tallahassee, it serves as the primary airport for Florida's capital city and the surrounding Big Bend region. Despite its designation as an "international airport", TLH currently does not offer scheduled international passenger flights. The international status was granted in 2015 following the installation of a federal customs and border protection facility, enabling it to handle international cargo and charter flights.

As of 2026, the airport provides commercial passenger service through several major airlines, including American Airlines and Delta Air Lines, offering nonstop flights to key hubs such as Atlanta, Charlotte, Dallas/Fort Worth, and Miami. With annual passenger traffic averaging between 850,000 and 900,000, Tallahassee International Airport ranks as one of the smaller commercial airports in Florida, yet remains a crucial transportation hub for the northern part of the state.

TLH covers 2,485 acres (1,006 hectares) and features two asphalt runways: Runway 9/27, measuring 8,000 feet (2,438 meters), and Runway 18/36, measuring 7,000 feet (2,134 meters). The airport accommodates commercial flights, cargo operations, general aviation, and military use. It also supports flight training programs affiliated with local educational institutions, including Tallahassee State College and Florida State University.

The airport also serves a vital role in regional emergency management, often functioning as a staging area for hurricane relief and other disaster response efforts due to its inland location and proximity to the Gulf Coast. Economically, TLH supports thousands of jobs in the region and contributes millions of dollars annually to the local economy through passenger travel, cargo operations, and associated businesses.

In April 2026, the airport was officially named Bobby Bowden-Tallahassee International Airport, honoring long-time Florida State University football coach Bobby Bowden.

== History ==
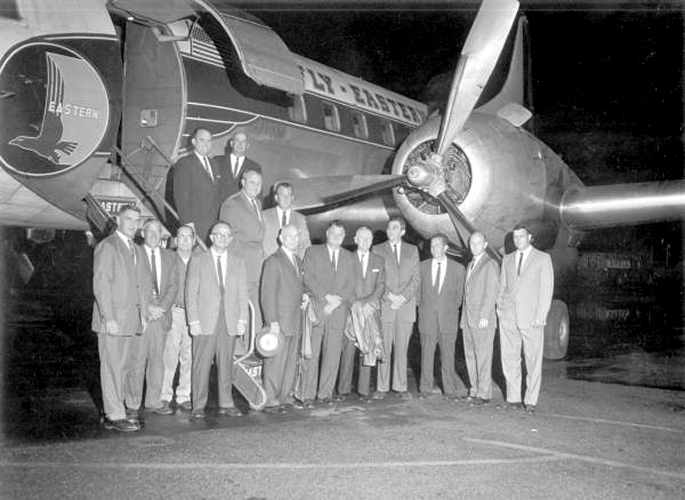
Mayor Joe Cordell and the City Commission at the new Tallahassee Municipal Airport on March 28, 1961

The airport began as Tallahassee Municipal Airport with a ceremony on April 23, 1961. The United States flag was presented to the City of Tallahassee by Captain Eddie Rickenbacker, World War I fighter ace and Chairman of the Board of Eastern Airlines. U.S. Army aircraft from Fort Rucker, Alabama, performed an aerial demonstration. Tallahassee Municipal replaced the city's first airport, Dale Mabry Field, which closed at the same time.

Eastern Airlines opened the airport by ferrying city, state, and chamber of commerce officials. Aboard the flight were Tallahassee Mayor Joe Cordell, State Comptroller Ray Green, Tallahassee City Commissioners Davis Atkinson, George Taff, Hugh Williams, Tallahassee City Manager Arvah Hopkins, Tallahassee City Clerk-Auditor George White, Airport Manager Flagg Chittenden, and Ernest Menendez, Frank Deller, James Calhoun, John Ward and Jeff Lewis, all of the Tallahassee-Leon County Chamber of Commerce.

In June 1961, less than two months after it opened, the airport was the site of Freedom Rider protests. The airport restaurant, Savarin, was designated "Whites Only", and closed rather than serve a racially-mixed group of clergy and activists. The protestors were arrested and removed, and later served prison sentences after the Supreme Court rejected their case in Dresner vs City of Tallahassee on a technicality.

From the airport's opening until the early 1980s, its primary runway was Runway 18/36, a 6,076-foot runway with an ILS approach, enabling all-weather approaches, and a USAF certified High TACAN approach for practice by Air Force aircraft based at Tyndall AFB, near Panama City. Runway 09/27 was 4,000 feet long and supported general aviation operations. By the 1970s, the airport had scheduled flights on Eastern Airlines, Delta Air Lines, National Airlines and Southern Airways, mainly on Boeing 727s, Boeing 737s and McDonnell Douglas DC-9s.

By the 1980s the terminal was becoming obsolete, and the 6,100 foot runway was too short for the Boeing 757 and Boeing 767 coming into service. Runway 09/27 was converted to a taxiway and a new Runway 09/27, 8,003 feet long with ILS, was built just to the south. A new passenger terminal was built just north of the new runway. Ground was broken on November 2, 1987, and the new terminal prompted officials to rename the airport from Tallahassee Municipal Airport to Tallahassee Regional Airport. On December 3, 1989, the city opened the $33 million terminal, and on February 20, 2000, the terminal was renamed the Ivan Munroe Terminal in honor of Tallahassee aviation pioneer Ivan Munroe. Munroe was the first man in Tallahassee to own a plane.

On July 20, 2002, FedEx Express Flight 1478 crashed a half mile short of the Runway 9 while attempting to land. The National Transportation Safety Board determined that the crash was due to a combination of pilot fatigue and pilot error. All three crewmembers survived.

On June 26, 2015, Tallahassee Regional Airport was renamed Tallahassee International Airport. On June 29, 2015, the City of Tallahassee and the FAA announced the name change. International passengers are allowed to exit the airport via Tallahassee International Airport due to the facility's full-service "service port" for U.S. Customs. The change allows international cargo and general aviation flights to directly come to Tallahassee, which is the leading cargo handler in the panhandle of Florida. Tallahassee handles 9.5 million pounds of cargo per year, more than the next city, Pensacola, which handles around 6.8 million pounds.

On November, 18, 2020, SkyWest, operating as United Express, started nonstop flights from Tallahassee International Airport to George Bush Intercontinental Airport.

On January 27, 2021, the airport was struck by an EF1 tornado, causing minor damage and temporary closure to assess the damage. A small plane was flipped and minor damage was done to a hangar. No injuries were reported.

On August 19, 2021, it was announced that United Airlines would no longer service Tallahassee International Airport after October 1, 2021.

On January 4, 2024, JetBlue started nonstop flights from Tallahassee to Fort Lauderdale-Hollywood International Airport. Due to underperformance and lack of customer demand, the airline announced it would end operations in Tallahassee on October 27, 2024, less than a year later.

On February 24, 2026, it was announced Breeze Airways would begin nonstop flights to Fort Lauderdale-Hollywood International Airport and Raleigh-Durham International Airport on July 2, 2026.

On April 14, 2026, Florida governor Ron DeSantis signed Florida Senate Bill 628, announcing that the airport would be renamed to Bobby Bowden-Tallahassee International Airport to honor long-time Florida State University football coach Bobby Bowden.

== Facilities ==
The airport covers 2,485 acres (1,006 ha) at an elevation of 81 feet (25 m). It has two runways: 09/27 is 8,000 by 150 feet (2,438 by 46 m) and 18/36 is 7,000 by 150 ft. (2,134 by 46 m). Helicopter operations are generally confined to the Runway 18/36 area, or direct approaches to the Million Air FBO ramp area.

In 2026, in line with projects by other airports in Florida, Tallahassee city officials considered a plan that would have allowed a vertiport to be built at the airport to allow easier access for helicopters and air taxis around Tallahassee. Officials ultimately rejected the proposal.

The Million Air FBO at the airport provides contracted fuel services to U.S. Military and Department of Defense aircraft. TLH is regularly visited by U.S. Navy P-8 Poseidon aircraft, Lockheed Martin C-130 family aircraft, as well as Dornier C-146 and T-6 Texan II aircraft on training missions and practice approaches.

The terminal building is divided into two concourses, A & B. All gates except for Gates A4 & A7 are located on the main level of the terminal, and are equipped with jet bridges, while Gates A2 & A4 are located on the lower level.

== Airlines and destinations ==
=== Passenger ===
Airlines	Destinations
American Eagle	Charlotte, Dallas/Fort Worth, Miami, Washington–National
Breeze Airways	Fort Lauderdale, Raleigh/Durham
Delta Air Lines	Atlanta
Delta Connection	Atlanta

=== Cargo ===
Airlines	Destinations
FedEx Feeder	Orlando

=== Top destinations ===
Busiest domestic routes from TLH (August 2025 – July 2026)
Rank	Airport	Passengers	Carriers
1	Atlanta, Georgia	155,400	Delta
2	Charlotte, North Carolina	64,020	American
4	Dallas/Fort Worth, Texas	43,720	American
3	Miami, Florida	18,810	American

=== Airline market share ===
Top airlines at TLH (August 2025 – July 2026)
Rank	Airline	Passengers	Percent of market share
1	Delta	289,000	51.76%
2	Envoy	129,000	23.03%
3	Piedmont	121,000	21.70%
4	Endeavor	16,260	2.91%
5	PSA	3,340	0.60%

== Incidents ==
- On October 20, 1956, a Lockheed 18-50 Lodestar (N33368) of National Airlines landed too far down the runway while it was wet, ground-looped, and went through a ditch into some trees. The aircraft was damaged beyond repair.
- On July 26, 2002, a Boeing 727-232F (N497FE) operating as FedEx Express Flight 1478 from Memphis was landing when the plane struck trees 3,650 feet short of the runway and hit the ground 1,000 feet later, slid an additional 1,100 feet through an open field, and came to rest 1,000 feet from the runway after hitting construction vehicles and burned out. The crash was found to be caused by crew fatigue; none of the three on board were killed.

== See also ==
- Florida World War II Army Airfields
- List of airports in Florida
