= FedEx Express =

Cargo airline of the United States

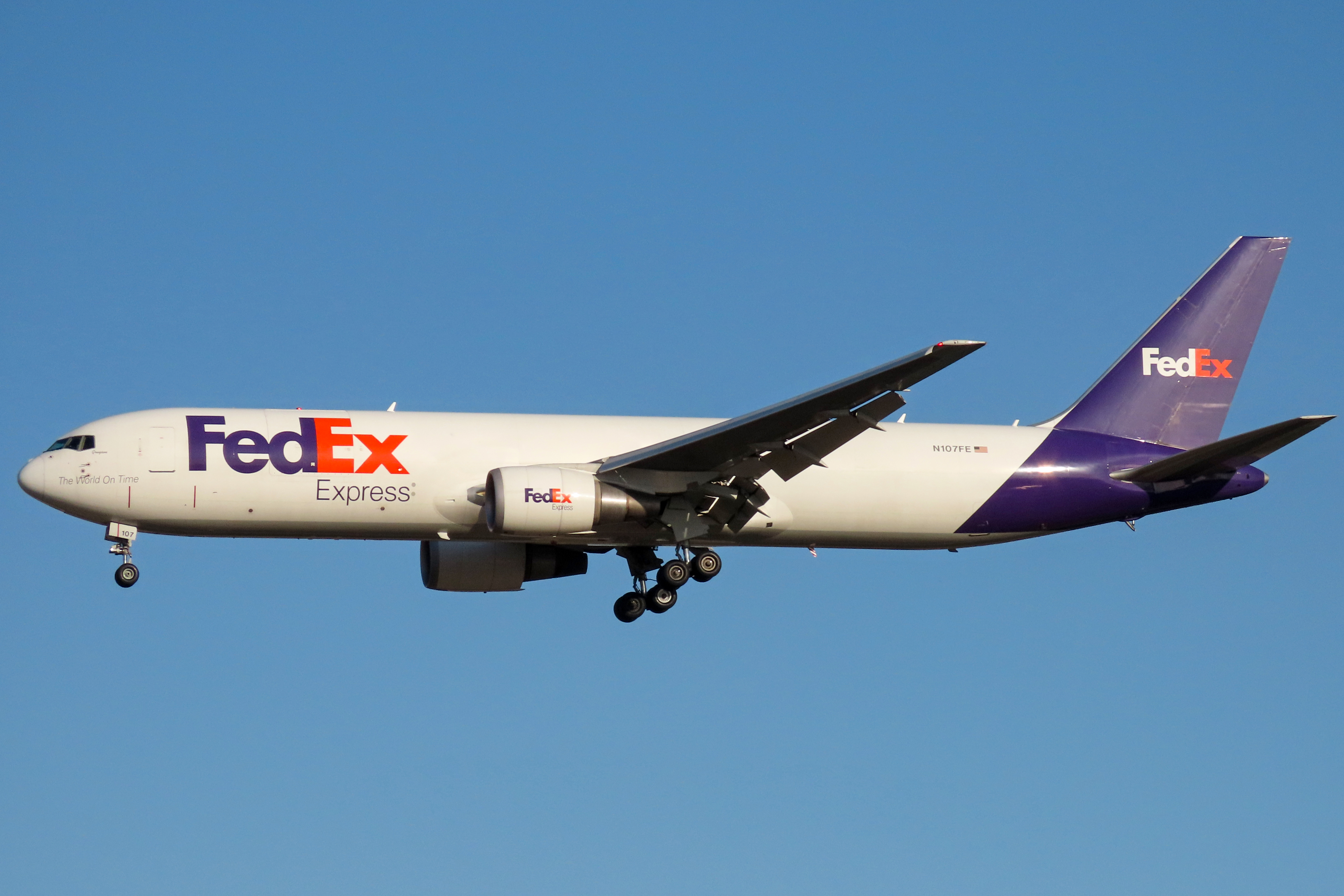
- A Boeing 767-300F of FedEx Express
IATA	ICAO	Call sign
FX	FDX	FEDEX
- Founded: June 18, 1971; 55 years ago (as Federal Express)
- Commenced operations: April 17, 1973; 53 years ago (as Federal Express); June 23, 1994; 32 years ago (as FedEx Express)
- AOC #: FDEA140A
- Hubs: Superhub; Memphis; National hub; Indianapolis; Regional hubs; Anchorage; Fort Worth–Alliance; Greensboro; Miami; Newark; Oakland; International hubs; Cologne/Bonn; Dubai–International; Guangzhou; Hong Kong; Istanbul; Liège; London–Stansted; Mumbai; Osaka–Kansai; Paris–Charles de Gaulle; Shanghai–Pudong; Singapore; Taipei–Taoyuan; Tokyo–Narita; Toronto Pearson
- Fleet size: 702
- Destinations: c. 375
- Parent company: FedEx Corporation
- Headquarters: Memphis, Tennessee, United States
- Key people: Raj Subramaniam (president & CEO)
- Employees: 278,000+ (2022)

FedEx Express is an American cargo airline based in Memphis, Tennessee, United States. As of 2023, it was the world's largest cargo airline in terms of fleet size and freight tons flown. It is the namesake and leading subsidiary of FedEx Corporation, delivering freight and packages to more than 375 destinations over 220 countries and territories across six continents each day.

The company's global "Super Hub" is located at Memphis International Airport. In the United States, FedEx Express has a national hub at Indianapolis International Airport, and regional hubs at airports in Anchorage, Fort Worth, Greensboro, Miami, Newark, Oakland and Ontario. International regional hubs are located at airports in Cologne/Bonn, Dubai, Bengaluru, Delhi, Guangzhou, Istanbul, Liege, Milan, Mumbai, Osaka, Paris, Seoul, Shanghai, Singapore, Taipei, Tokyo, and Toronto.

== History ==
=== Early history ===
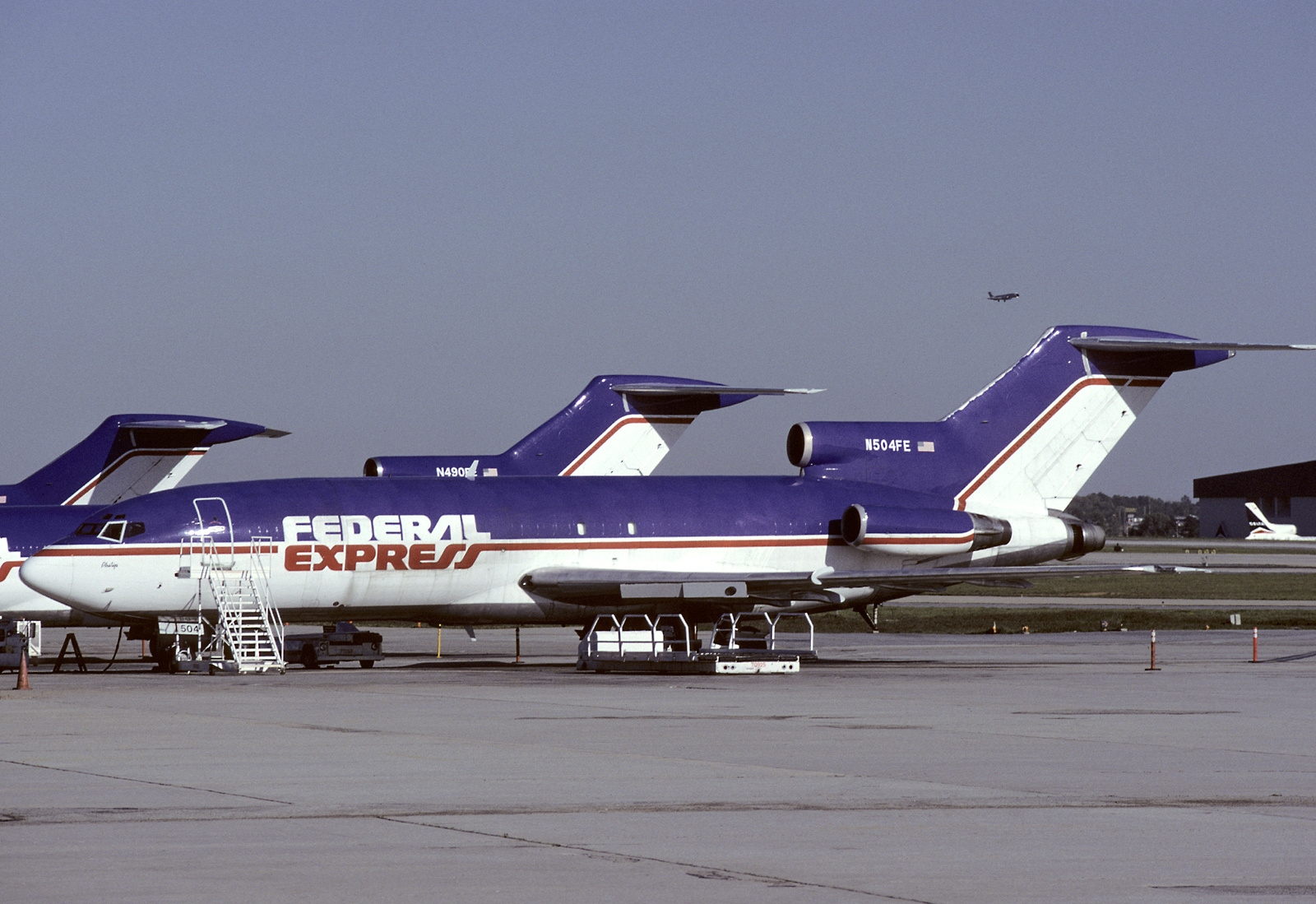
A Federal Express Boeing 727-100F, with several other 727s in the background. The Boeing 727s remained the backbone of the fleet until the mid-2000s.

The concept for what became Federal Express came to Fred Smith in the mid-1960s, while an undergraduate student at Yale. For an economics class, he submitted a paper which argued that in modern technological society time meant money more than ever before and with the advent of miniaturized electronic circuitry, very small components had become extremely valuable. He argued that the consumer society was becoming increasingly hungry for mass-produced electronic items, but the decentralizing effect induced by these very devices gave manufacturers tremendous logistic problems in delivering the items. Smith felt that the necessary delivery speed could only be achieved by using air transport. But he believed that the U.S. air cargo system was so inflexible and bound by regulations at that time that it was completely incapable of making really fast deliveries.

In his paper, Smith proposed a new concept—have one carrier be responsible for a piece of cargo from local pick-up right through to ultimate delivery, operating its own aircraft, depots, posting stations, and delivery vans. To ensure accurate sorting and dispatching of every item of freight, the carrier would fly it from all of its pickup stations to a central clearinghouse, from where the entire operation would be controlled. For years it has been misreported that the professor teaching the course gave the paper the grade of "C", but Fred clarified in a 2004 interview that the grade is not known and the reports of a "C" grade were due to his response to a reporter who asked him what grade he received and his reply was, "I don't know, probably made my usual C." Despite the professor's opinion, Smith held on to the idea.

Smith founded Federal Express Corporation in 1971 with $4 million from his inheritance and $91 million in venture capital in Little Rock, Arkansas, where Smith was operating Little Rock Airmotive. After a lack of support from Clinton National Airport, Smith moved the company to Memphis, Tennessee and Memphis International Airport in 1973.

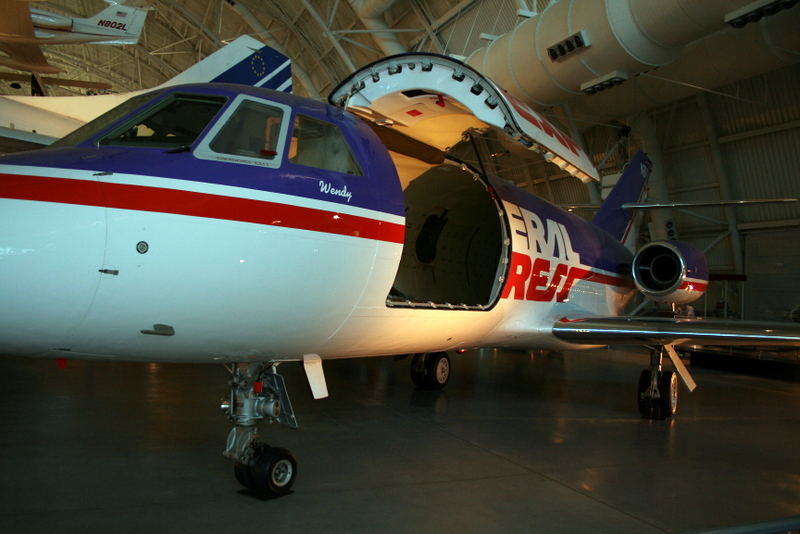
First FedEx Express aircraft, a Dassault Falcon 20 named Wendy, on display at Steven F. Udvar-Hazy Center

The company started overnight operations on April 17, 1973, with fourteen Dassault Falcon 20s that connected twenty-five cities in the United States. Fred Smith's childhood friend, John Fry of Ardent Studios, sent Ardent partner Terry Manning to the Federal Express home office on Democrat Road near the Memphis Airport with the first package to be put into the system. That night, 186 packages were carried. Services included both overnight and two-day package and envelope delivery services, as well as Courier Pak. Federal Express began to market itself as "the freight service company with 550-mile-per-hour delivery trucks". However, the company began to experience financial difficulties, losing up to a million USD a month. While waiting for a flight home to Memphis from Chicago after being turned down for capital by General Dynamics, Smith impulsively hopped on a flight to Las Vegas, where he won $27,000 playing blackjack. The winnings enabled the cash-strapped company to meet payroll the following Monday. "The $27,000 wasn't decisive, but it was an omen that things would get better", Smith says. In the end, he raised somewhere between $50 and $70 million, from twenty of the US's leading risk venture speculators, including such companies as the First National City Bank of New York and the Bank of America in California. At the time, Federal Express was the most highly financed new company in U.S. history, in terms of venture capital.

Federal Express installed its first drop box in 1975 which allowed customers to drop off packages without going to a company local branch. In 1976, the company became profitable with an average volume of 19,000 parcels per day.

The company's early growth was fueled importantly by its advertising. In 1973, the company promoted itself as "A whole new airline, for packages only." Later, the company produced the famous television commercial "Fast Paced World", featuring fast talking actor John Moschitta Jr., under the banner: "When it absolutely, positively has to be there overnight."

=== Rapid growth ===
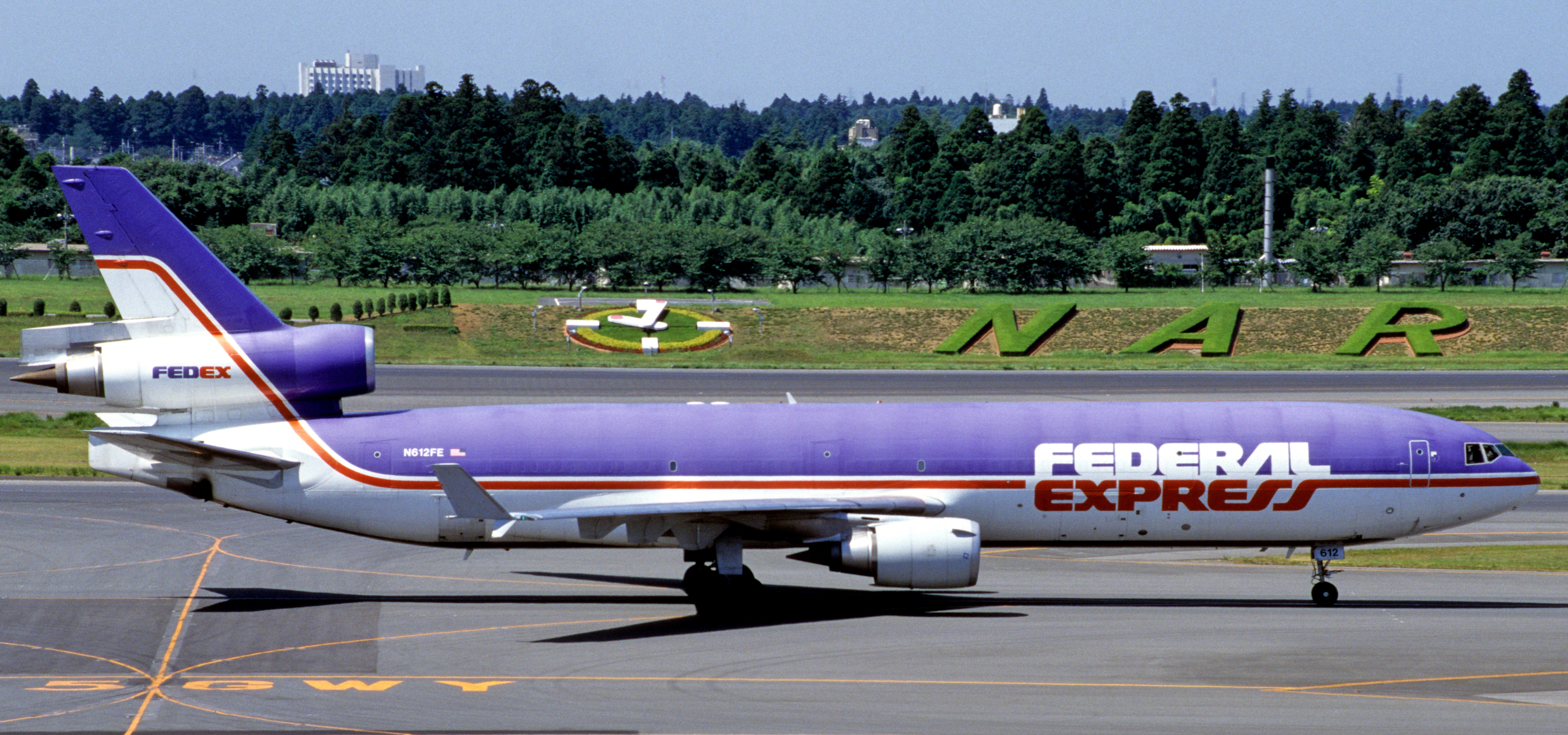
McDonnell Douglas MD-11 at Tokyo–Narita in 1995

In 1977 the Airline Deregulation Act removed restrictions on the routes operated by all-cargo airlines, and enabled Federal Express to purchase its first large aircraft: seven Boeing 727-100s. In 1978, the company went public and was listed on The New York Stock Exchange. The following year, it became the first shipping company to use a computer to manage packages when it launched "COSMOS" (Customers, Operations and Services Master Online System), a centralized computer system to manage people, packages, vehicles, and weather scenarios in real time. In 1980, the company implemented "DADS" (Digitally Assisted Dispatch System) to coordinate on-call pickups for customers; this system allows customers to schedule pickups for the same day.

In 1980, Federal Express began service to a further 90 cities in the United States. The following year, the company introduced its overnight letter to compete with the U.S. Postal Service's Express Mail, and allowed document shipping for the first time. Later, in 1981, it started international operations with service to Canada, and officially opened its "Superhub" at the Memphis International Airport.

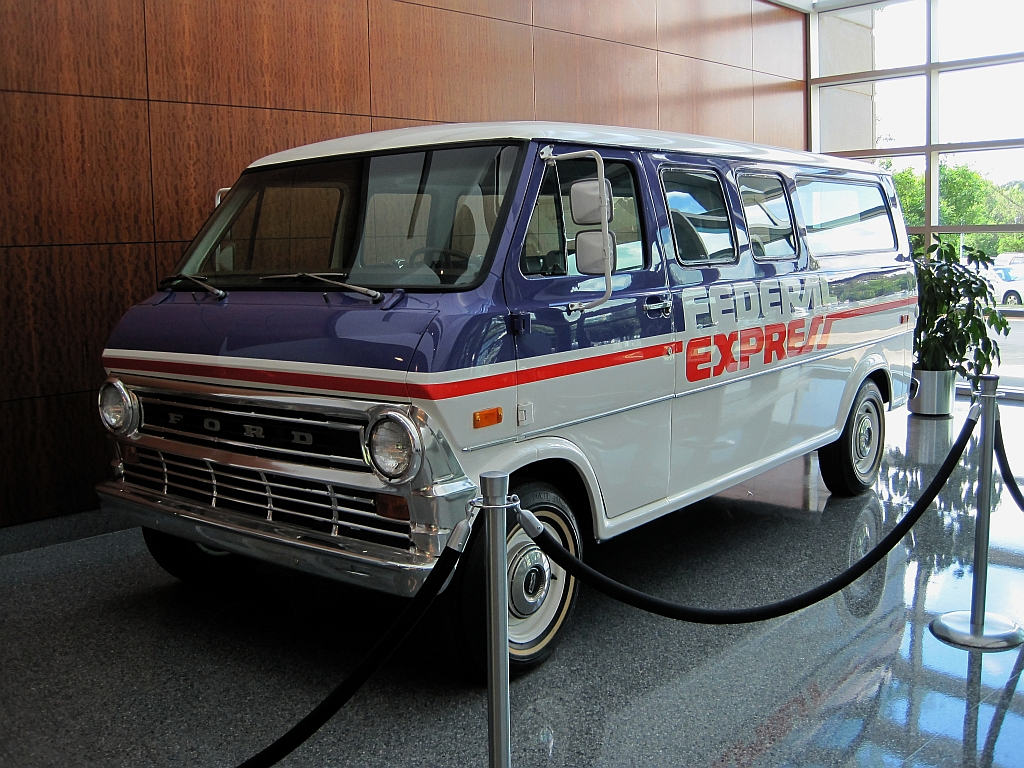
First FedEx van on display at the world headquarters complex in Memphis, Tennessee

Federal Express' sales topped $1 billion for the first time in 1983. In the same year the company introduced ZapMail, a fax service that guaranteed the delivery of up to five pages in less than two hours for $35. ZapMail would later become a huge failure for the company, costing it hundreds of millions of dollars.

In the 1970s, with the enormous growth, FedEx needed a method for quality control. They developed the tracking number for internal use to find that packages were moving properly. This info was eventually applied to all packages and be made available to the public to find the status of one's own package. In 1986, the company introduced the "SuperTracker", a hand-held bar code scanner which brought parcel tracking to the shipping industry for the first time. Federal Express continued its rapid expansion in the late 1980s, and opened its hub at Newark Liberty International Airport in 1986 and at Indianapolis International Airport and Oakland International Airport in 1988. In 1989, the company acquired Flying Tiger Line to expand its international service, and subsequently opened a hub at Ted Stevens Anchorage International Airport to accommodate this new, expanded service. As the volume of international shipments increased, Federal Express created Clear Electronic Customs Clearance System to expedite regulatory clearance while cargo is en route.

=== FedEx era ===
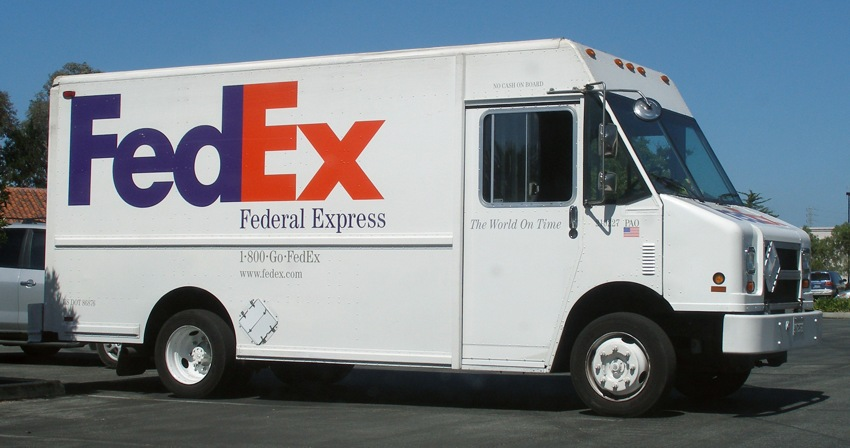
A FedEx Express delivery truck, showing the dual branding, both "FedEx" and "Federal Express", that the company used from 1994 to 2000

In 1994, Federal Express rebranded itself as "FedEx" for marketing purposes, officially adopting a nickname that had been used for years. Also that year, FedEx launched fedex.com as the first transportation web site to offer online package tracking, which allowed customers to conduct business via Internet. In 1995, the company acquired air routes from Evergreen International to start services to China, and opened an Asia-Pacific hub at Subic Bay International Airport in the Philippines. In 1997, FedEx opened its hub at Fort Worth Alliance Airport and, in 1999, opened a European hub at Charles de Gaulle Airport in France.

In the 1990s, FedEx planned, but later abandoned, a joint service with British Airways to have BA fly a Concorde supersonic jet airliner to Shannon Airport in Ireland with FedEx packages on board, and then FedEx would have flown the packages subsonically to their delivery points in Europe. Ron Ponder, a vice president at the time, was in charge of this proposed venture.

In 1998, FedEx merged with Caliber System and reorganized as a holding company, FDX Corporation. In 2000, FDX changed its name to FedEx Corporation and standardized the names of its subsidiaries around the "FedEx" brand. The original "Federal Express" cargo airline changed its name to "FedEx Express" to distinguish its express shipping service from others offered by the FedEx parent company.

In 2001, FedEx Express signed a 7-year sole source contract to transport all Express Mail and Priority Mail for the United States Postal Service. Prior to 2001, the Postal Service contracted with multiple airlines on a regional basis for these services. This contract allowed FedEx to place drop boxes at every USPS post office. In 2007, the contract was extended until September 2013. In 2013, FedEx Express won a new 7-year contract for the services ending in 2020, beating out UPS Airlines which launched a competitive bid. In 2017, the Postal Service extended the 2013 contract to 2024. The USPS continues to be the largest customer of FedEx Express.

In December 2006, FedEx Express acquired the British courier company ANC Holdings Limited for £120 million. The acquisition added 35 sort facilities to the FedEx network and the company introduced Newark, Memphis, and Indianapolis routes directly to UK airports instead of stopping at FedEx's European hub at Charles de Gaulle Airport. In September 2007, ANC was rebranded as FedEx UK. FedEx Express also acquired Flying-Cargo Hungary Kft to expand service in Eastern Europe.

=== Economic downturn ===
The late-2000s recession hit parent company FedEx Corporation and its express division hard. Many companies looking for ways to save money stopped shipping or moved to cheaper alternatives, such as surface shipping. FedEx Corporation announced large network capacity reductions at FedEx Express, including retiring some of its oldest and least efficient aircraft such as the McDonnell Douglas DC-10 and the Airbus A310. FedEx also announced layoffs and work hour reductions at some of its hubs.

In December 2008, FedEx postponed delivery of the new Boeing 777 Freighter; four were delivered in 2010 as previously agreed, but in 2011, FedEx only took delivery of four, rather than the ten originally planned. The remaining aircraft were delivered in 2012 and 2013.

FedEx Express closed a hub for the first time in its history, when operations at its Asian-Pacific hub at Subic Bay International Airport in the Philippines ceased on February 6, 2009. The operations were transferred to Guangzhou Baiyun International Airport in southern China. FedEx Express had planned to open the new Chinese hub in December 2008, but in November 2008, the company delayed the opening until early 2009, citing the need to fully test the new hub.

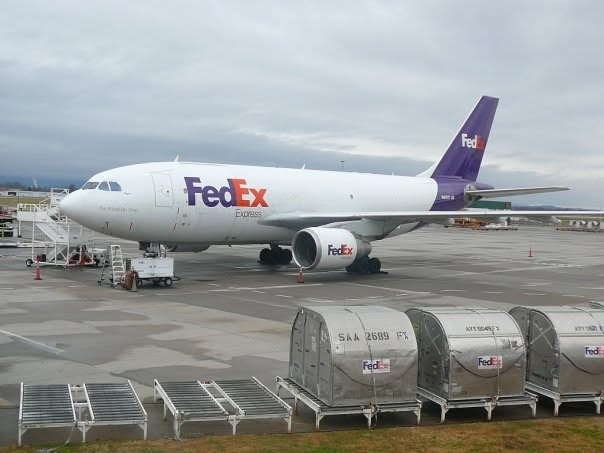
A FedEx Express A310 parked on the ramp at McGhee Tyson Airport

On June 2, 2009, FedEx opened the new hub building at Piedmont Triad International Airport in Greensboro, North Carolina. FedEx announced in December 2008 that it still intended to open the building on time despite the bad economy. The hub's operations would be scaled back from 1,500 employees to only 160, the size of the previous operations at the much smaller sorting facility. FedEx gave no time line as to when the hub would be operating at expected hub levels. The hub had been delayed many years since FedEx first picked the airport to be its Mid-Atlantic U.S. hub back in 1998. FedEx had to fight many complaints from nearby homeowners about the anticipated noise generated by its aircraft, because most of its flights take place at night. A third runway was built to accommodate the hub operation and the extra aircraft. FedEx began full hub operations at the Greensboro facility on September 2, 2018.

On October 27, 2010, FedEx opened its Central and Eastern European hub at Cologne Bonn Airport. The hub features a fully automated sorting system that can process up to 18,000 packages per hour. The roof of the hub features FedEx's largest solar power installation, producing 800,000 kilowatt hours per year.

On December 7, 2018, the company announced the retirement of David Cunningham on December 31, 2018. He was succeeded as CEO and president by Raj Subramaniam.

On November 6, 2019, FedEx Express announced that it would establish an additional Asia-Pacific gateway in the Philippines. The company planned to expand its operations in Clark. It opened a 17,000-square-metre (180,000 sq ft) facility in July 2021 at a cost of US$30 million.

== Fleet ==
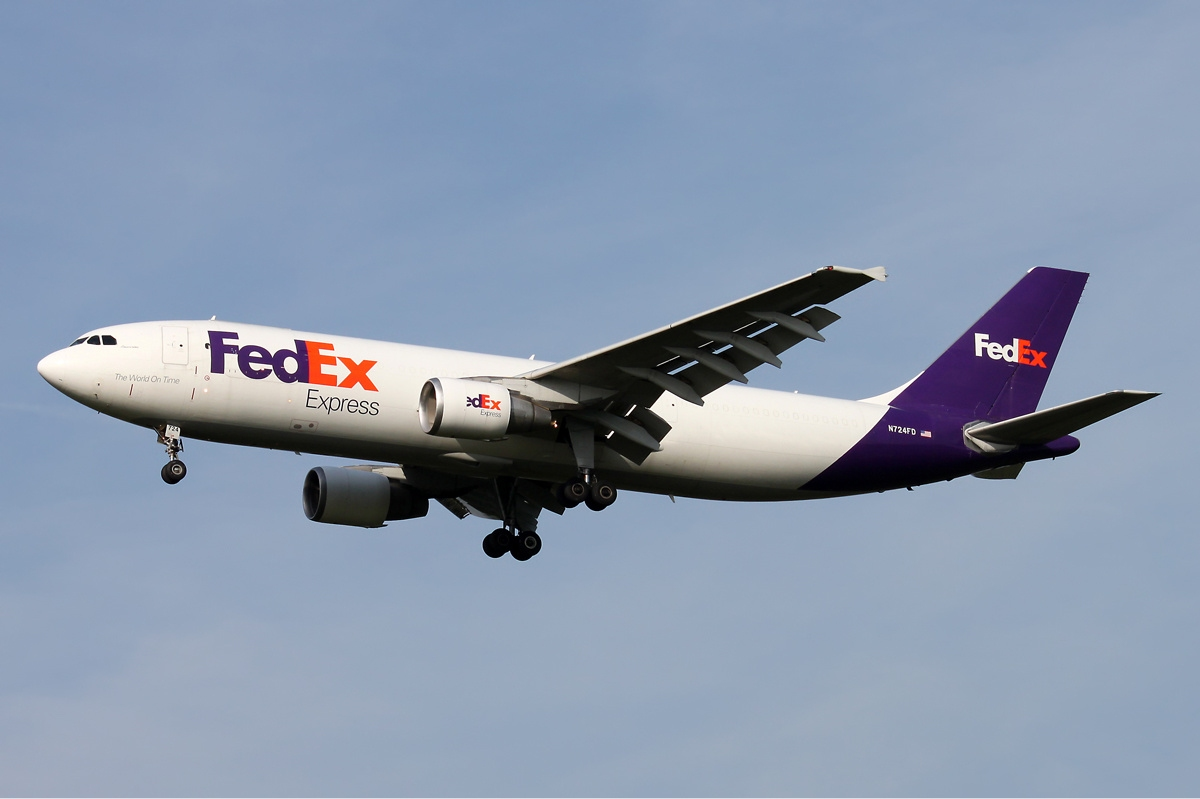
FedEx Express Airbus A300-600RF

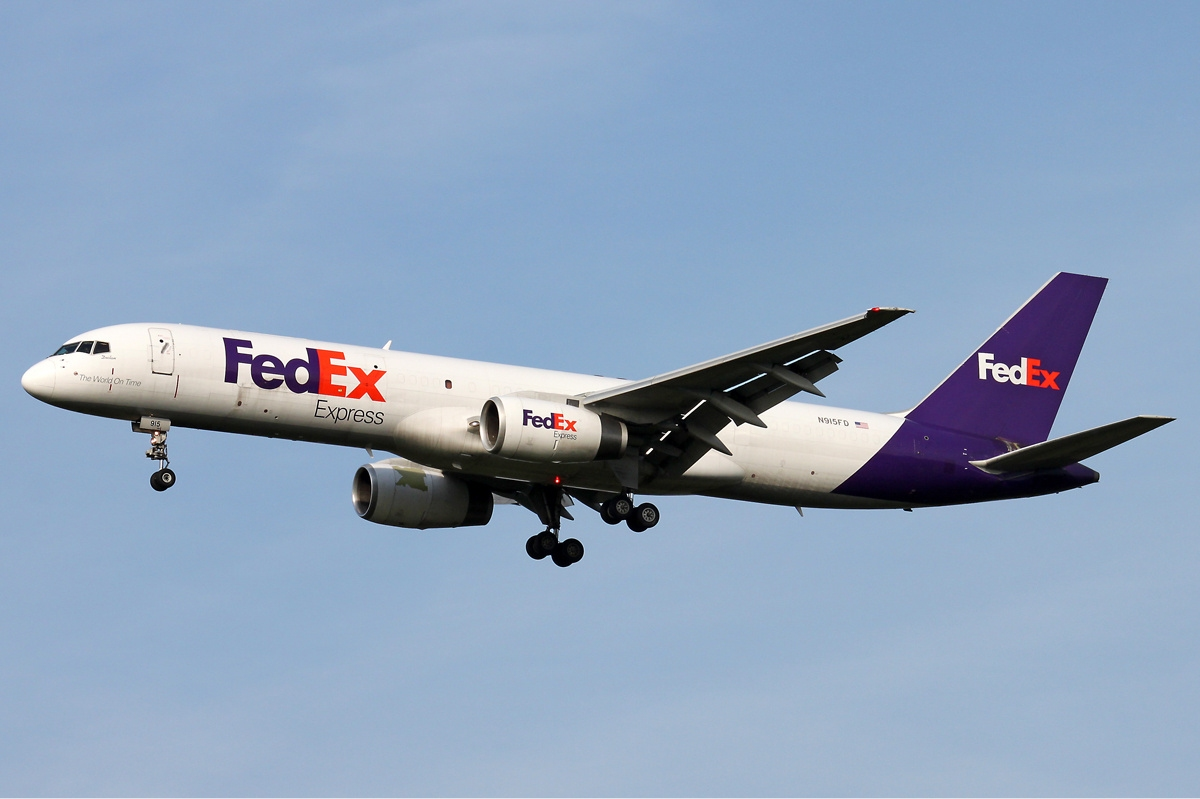
FedEx Express Boeing 757-200SF

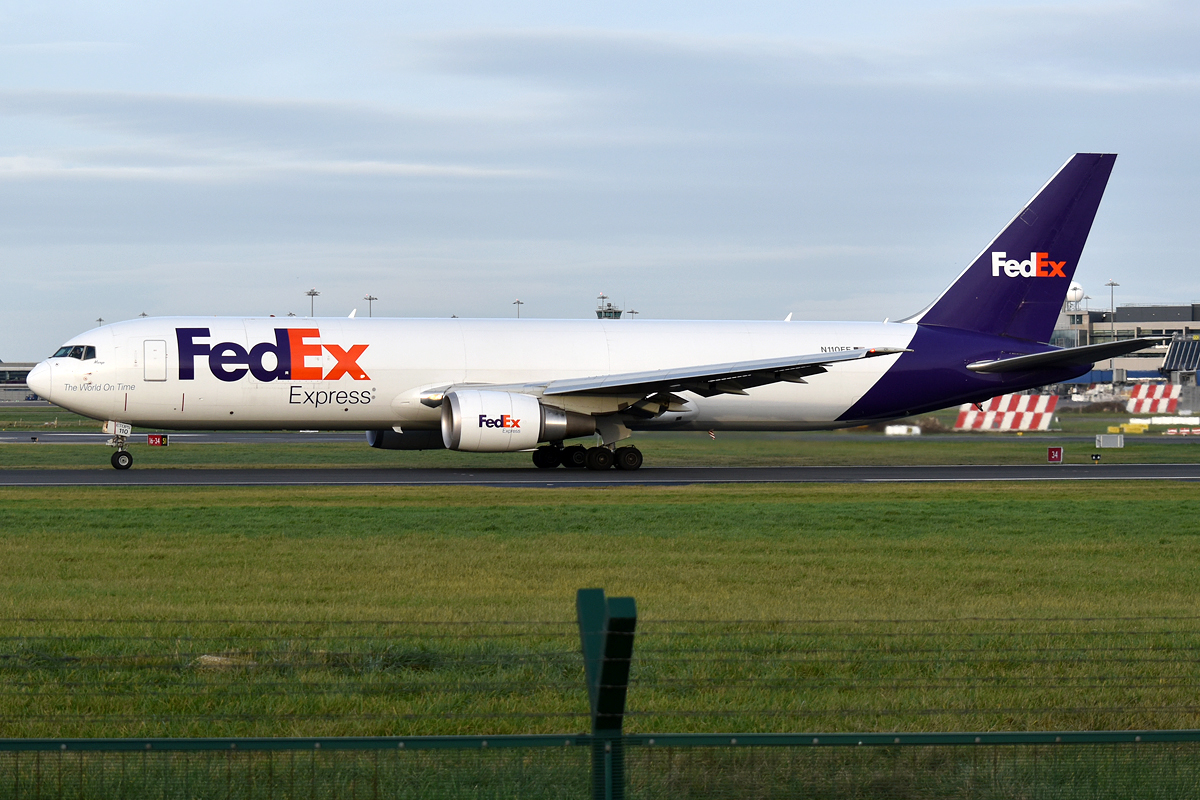
FedEx Express Boeing 767-300F

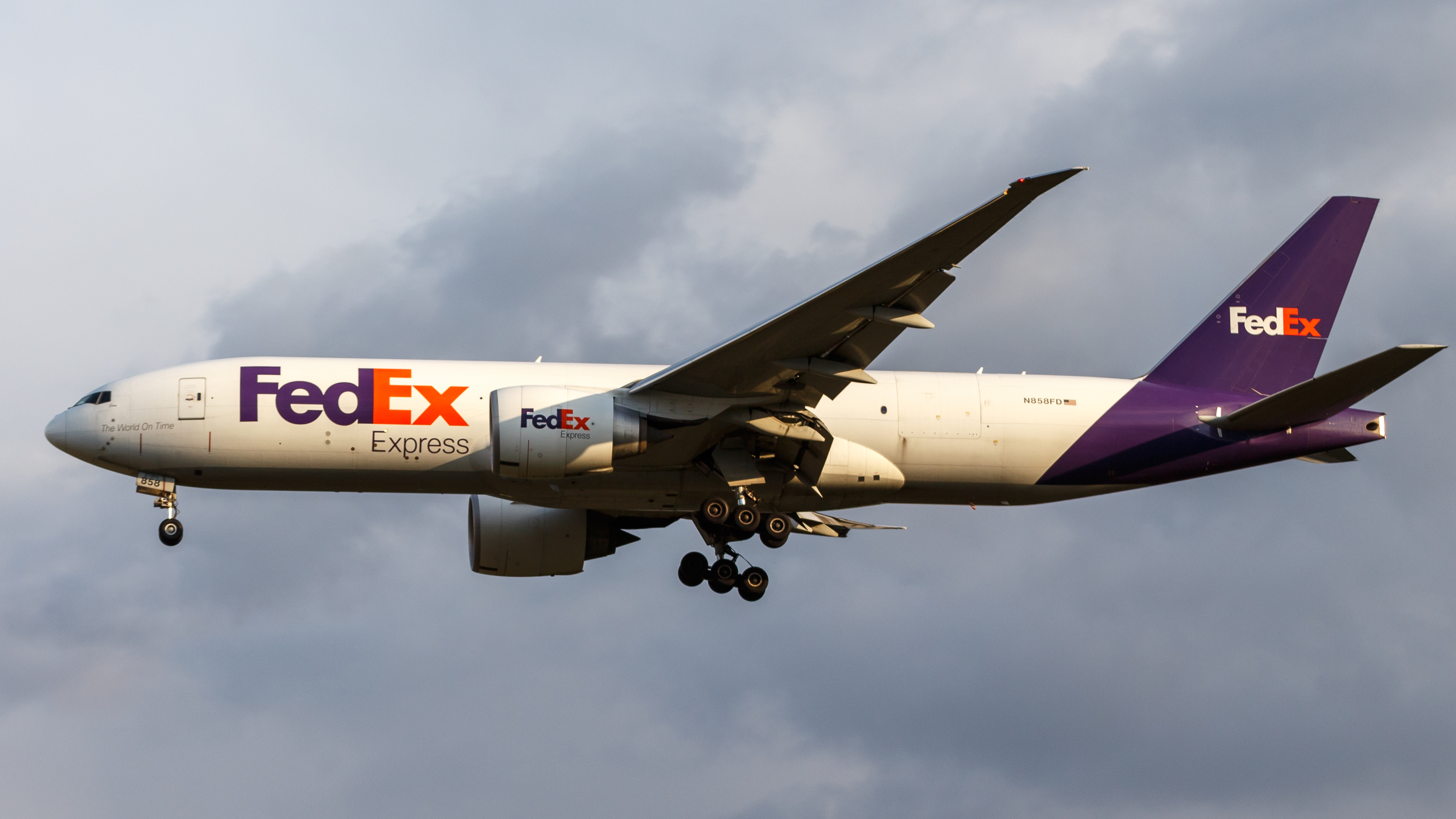
FedEx Express Boeing 777F

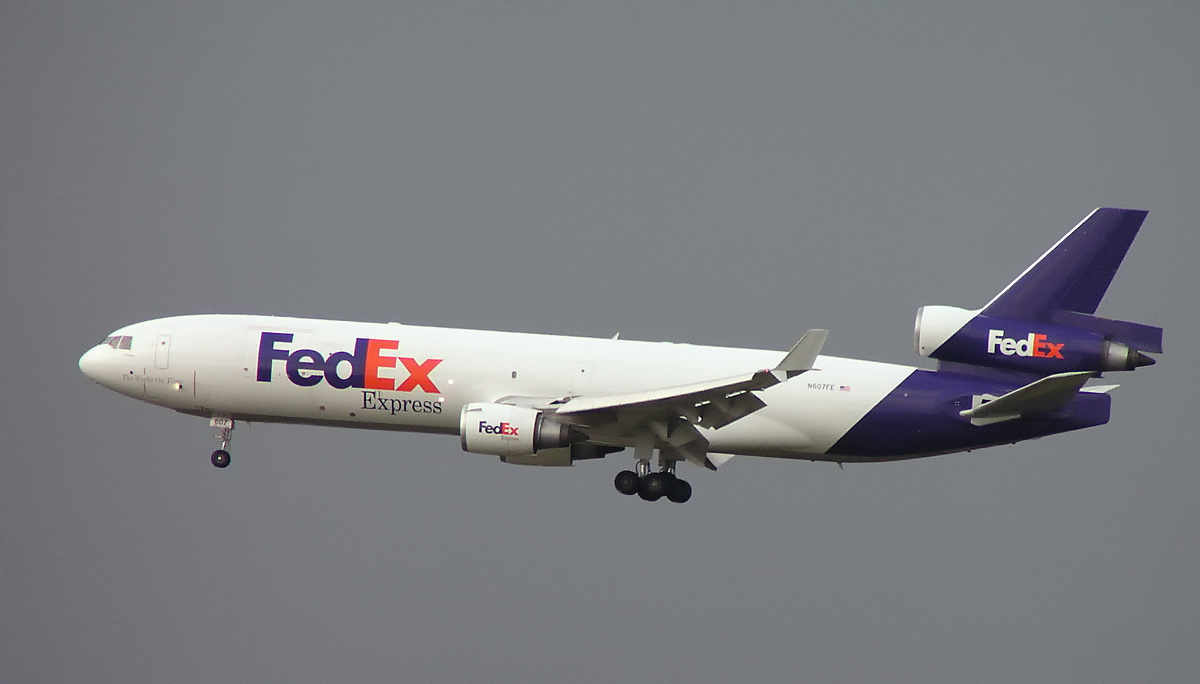
FedEx Express McDonnell Douglas MD-11F

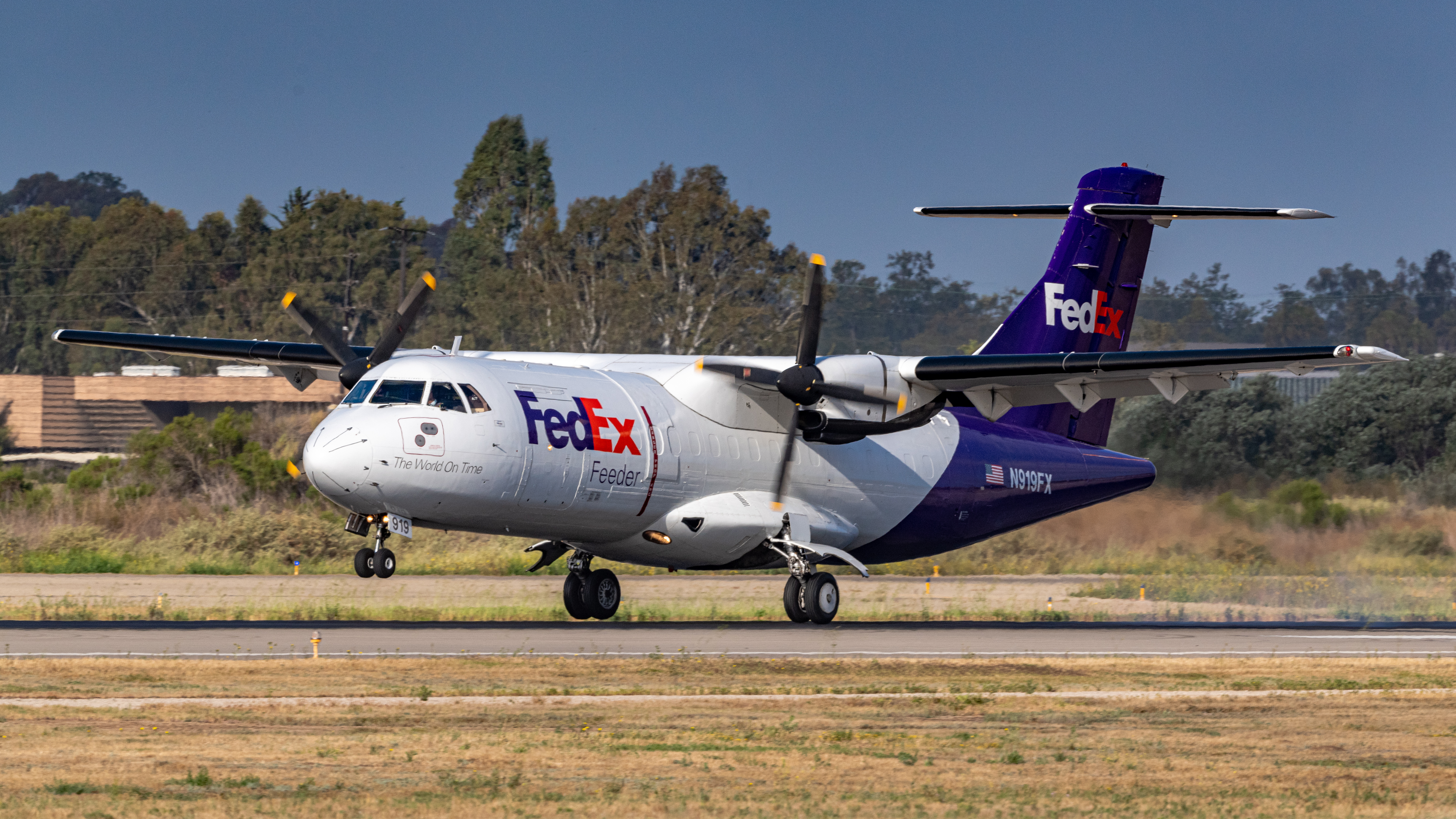
FedEx Feeder ATR 42-300F

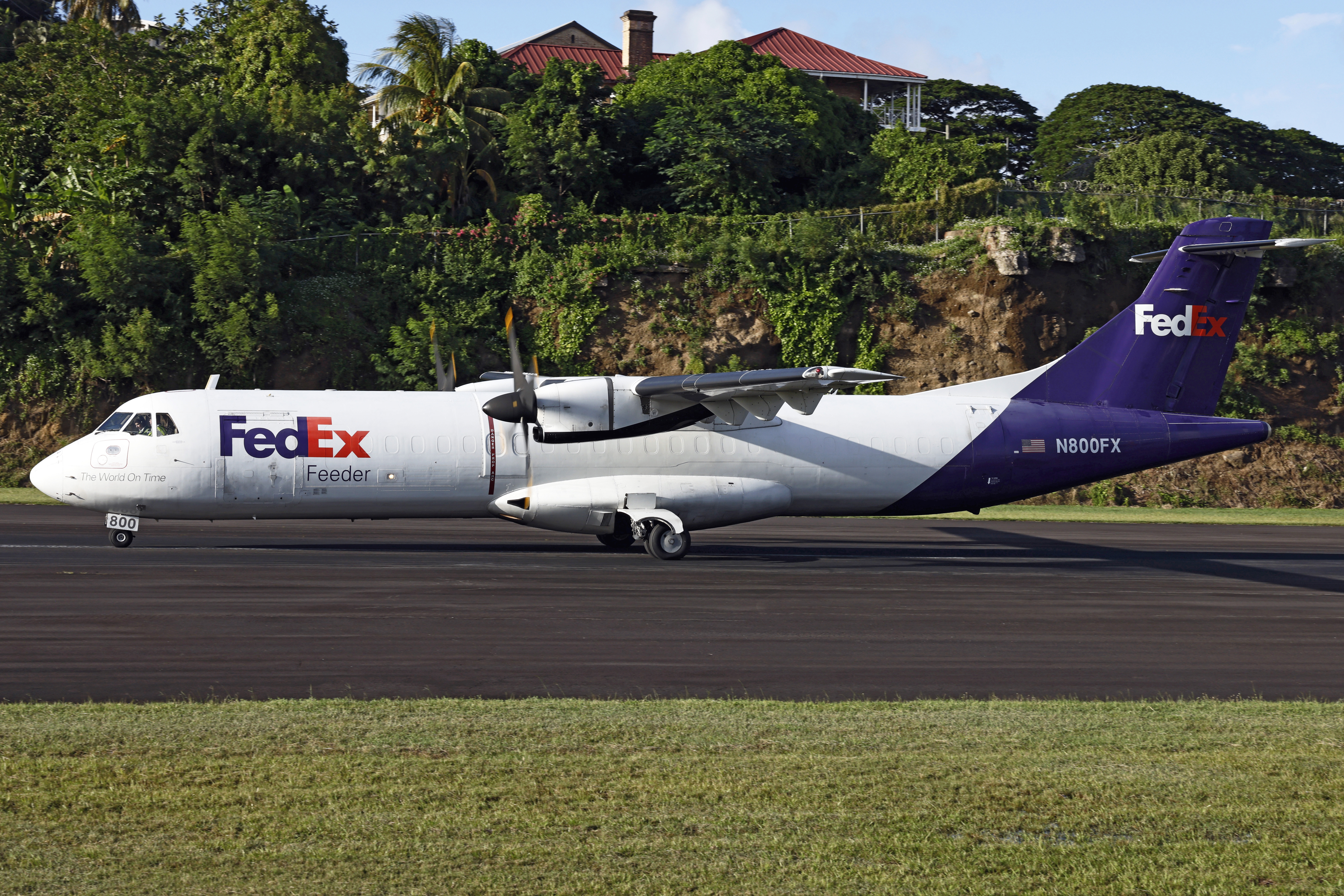
FedEx Feeder ATR 72-200F

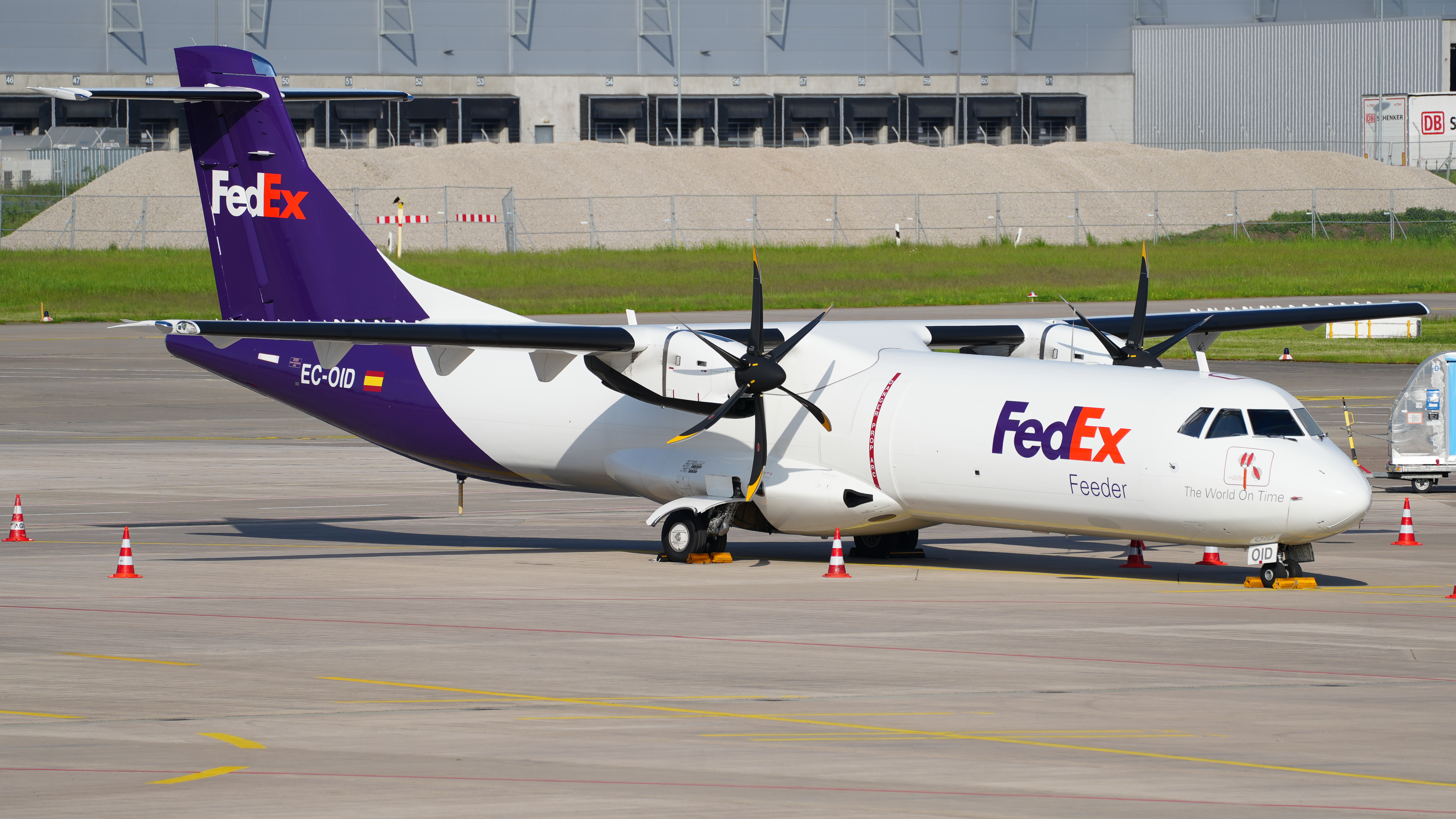
FedEx Feeder ATR 72-600F

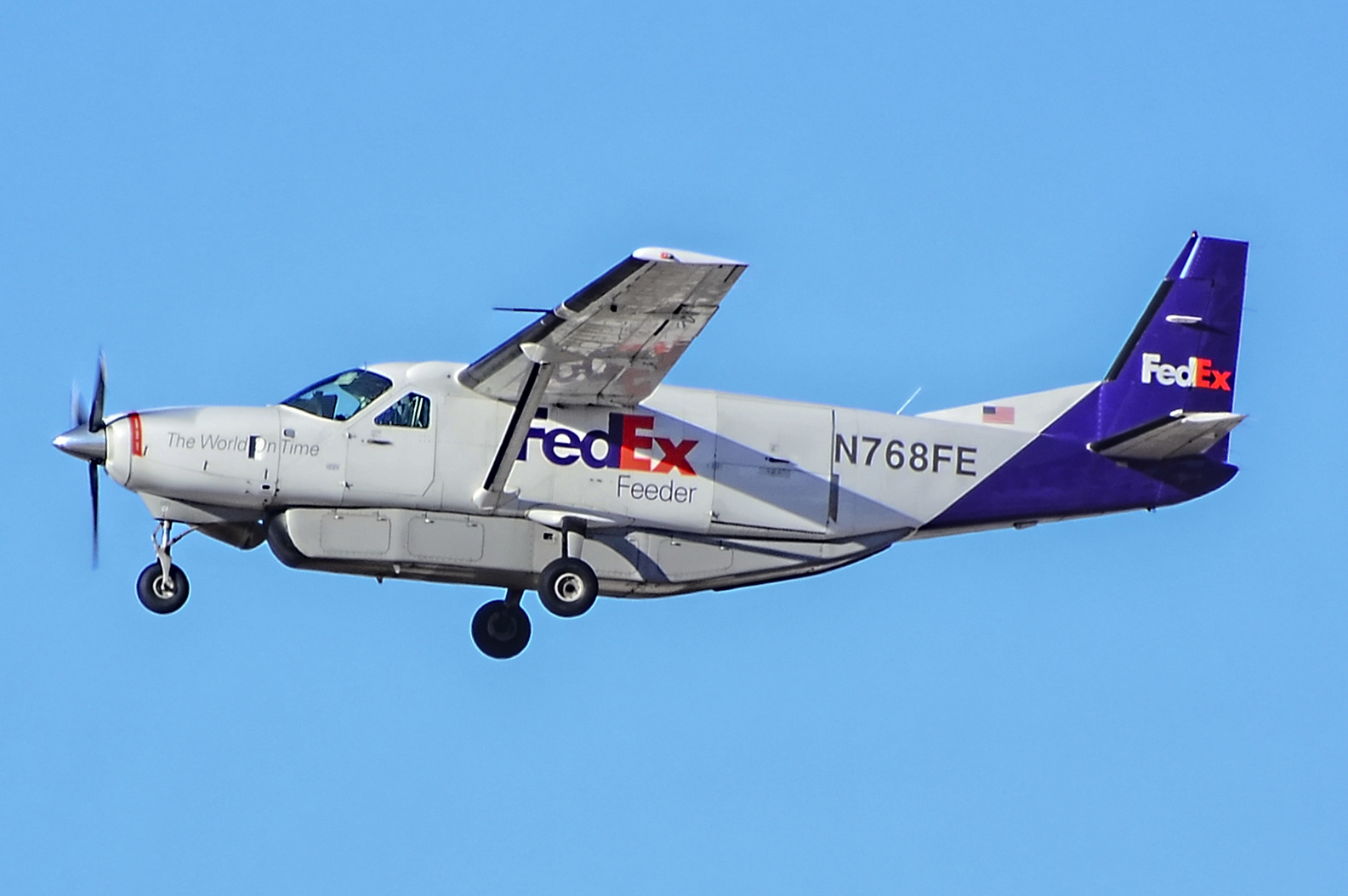
FedEx Feeder Cessna 208B Super Cargomaster

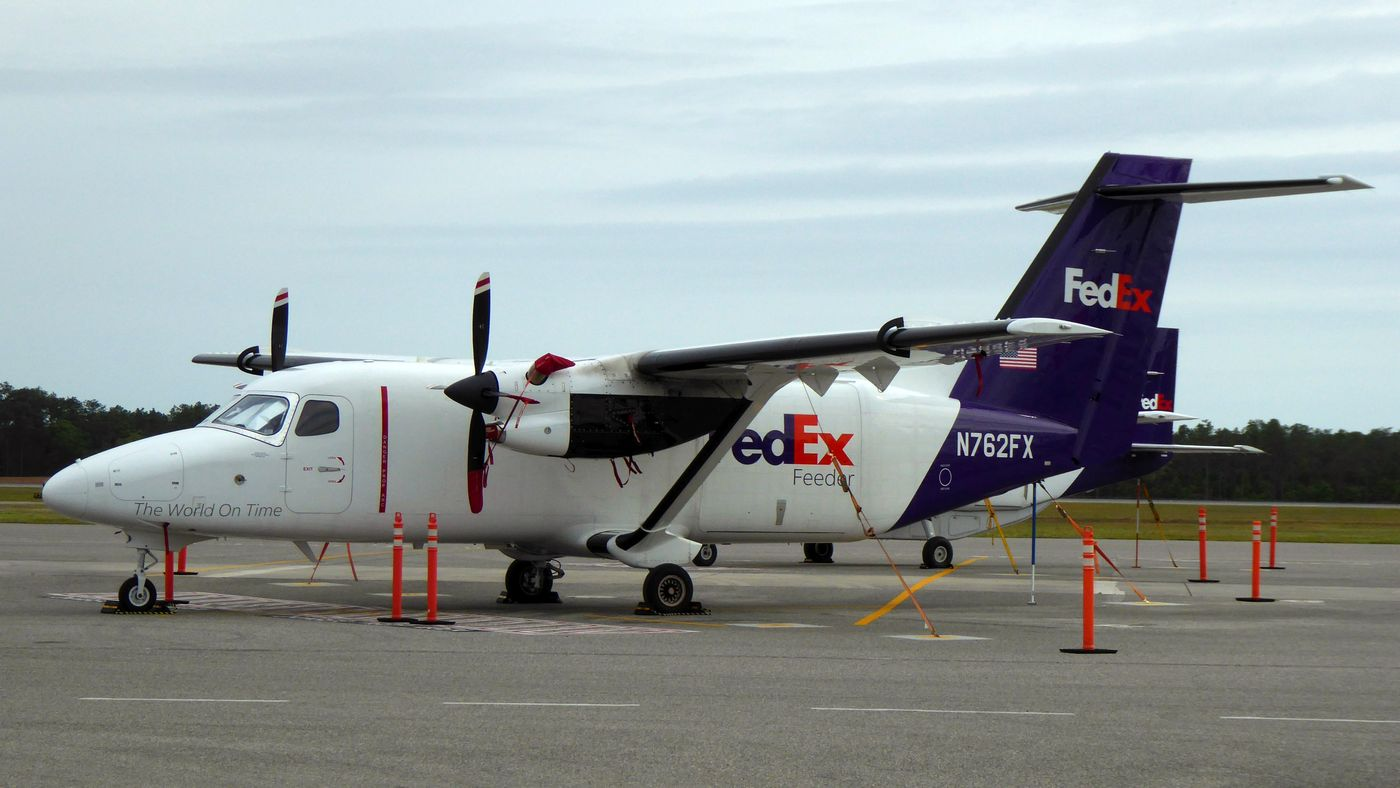
FedEx Feeder Cessna 408 SkyCourier

=== Current fleet ===
As of September 2026, FedEx Express operates the following aircraft:

Aircraft	In service	Orders	Notes
Airbus A300-600RF	57	—	Includes the last Airbus A300 ever built, N692FE. Older aircraft to be retired and replaced by Boeing 767-300F. Largest operator.
Boeing 757-200SF	86	—	Largest operator.
Boeing 767-300F	152	—	Replacing older Airbus A300-600RF and MD-11F. Largest operator.
Boeing 777F	60	9	Deliveries through 2027. Replacing MD-11F. Largest operator.
McDonnell Douglas MD-11F	29	—	Largest operator. Retirement set for 2032, to be replaced by Boeing 767-300F and 777F.
Total	384	9	
FedEx Feeder contracted fleet
ATR 42-300F	15	—	
ATR 72-200F	18	—	
ATR 72-600F	27	15	Launch customer. Deliveries began in 2020.
Cessna 208B Super Cargomaster	212	—	Largest operator.
Cessna 408 SkyCourier	41	9	Launch customer. Deliveries began in May 2022.
Total	313	24	

Note: "F" stands for freighter aircraft. "SF" stands for special freighter aircraft, which are converted from passenger aircraft.

FedEx Express operates the world's largest cargo air fleet with more than 650 aircraft, and is the largest operator of the Airbus A300, ATR 42, Cessna 208 and the McDonnell Douglas MD-11. The company took delivery of the last Boeing 727 built in September 1984 and the last A300/A310 built in July 2007. To be able to respond to changing freight demand quickly (i.e. more cargo that can fit on an aircraft), or to prevent cargo from being stranded on aircraft grounded with mechanical problems, FedEx Express tends to keep a number of empty or underloaded aircraft (usually five) in the air during the overnight to "sweep" the US.

In 2007, FedEx revealed plans to acquire 90 Boeing 757-200SFs. Because production ended in 2005, FedEx was left with no choice but to acquire secondhand aircraft from other airlines to replace its aging Boeing 727 fleet, at a cost of US$2.6 billion. The 757's debut for revenue service was on May 28, 2008. The last Boeing 727 was retired on June 21, 2013, after 35 years of service with FedEx.

FedEx Express was scheduled to be the launch airline for the Airbus A380 freighter, having ordered ten for delivery between 2008 and 2011 with options on ten more. The company had planned to introduce the first aircraft into service in August 2008 for use on routes between hubs in the United States and Asia. Faced with A380 delays of more than two years, FedEx canceled these orders and replaced them with an order for 15 Boeing 777Fs with an option for 15 more, to be delivered from 2009 through 2011. FedEx has said that Airbus will allow it to transfer its nonrefundable deposits to purchases of future aircraft, and has stated it may consider the A380F when the A380 program is less affected by construction delays. In December 2008, FedEx postponed delivery of some of the 777s: four were to be delivered in 2010 as previously agreed, and four more in 2011, rather than the 10 originally planned. Delivery of the remaining aircraft was postponed to 2012 and 2013. In January 2009, FedEx exercised its options to buy 15 more 777 freighters and acquired options for a further 15.

On December 15, 2011, FedEx announced an order for 27 Boeing 767-300Fs to replace its MD-10s. The 767s will be delivered between 2014 and 2018, with three aircraft being delivered in 2014, and with six aircraft delivered each year between 2015 and 2018. The airline also delayed deliveries of eleven Boeing 777Fs currently on order, but converted two options to firm orders.

On July 2, 2012, FedEx announced an order for an additional 15 Boeing 767-300Fs to replace its MD-10 and A310-200 aircraft. As part of this announcement, it converted four of its Boeing 777 freighter order to 767-300Fs, for a total of 19 new 767s. The first Boeing 767-300F was delivered to the airline on September 4, 2013.

With one of the world's largest aircraft fleets, FedEx Express is the largest contributor to the United States Civil Reserve Air Fleet in terms of aircraft pledged.

The first Dassault Falcon 20C delivered to FedEx (operated with the registration N8FE) is on display at the Steven F. Udvar-Hazy Center of the National Air and Space Museum at the Smithsonian Institution.

On November 7, 2025, FedEx announced they had grounded their MD-11 fleet, days after UPS Airlines Flight 2976 was involved in a deadly crash in Kentucky. In May 2026, FedEx started to return its MD-11 to service following required inspections.

The airline plans to retire two MD-11 in 2028, six in 2029, and seven each in the following three years.

=== Historical fleet ===
Aircraft	Total	Introduced	Retired	Replaced by	Remarks
Boeing 727-100F	75	1977	2013	Boeing 757-200SF	Last commercial flight was June 21, 2013. FedEx continues to sell the 727 engine hush kit developed with Pratt & Whitney. Including N217FE, the last Boeing 727 ever Built.
Dassault Falcon 20	33	1973	1985	Boeing 727	
McDonnell Douglas DC-10-10F	25	1980	2021	Boeing 767-300F	
McDonnell Douglas MD-10-10F	64	1980	2021	Boeing 767-300F	
McDonnell Douglas MD-10-30F	18	1980	2023	Boeing 767-300F	

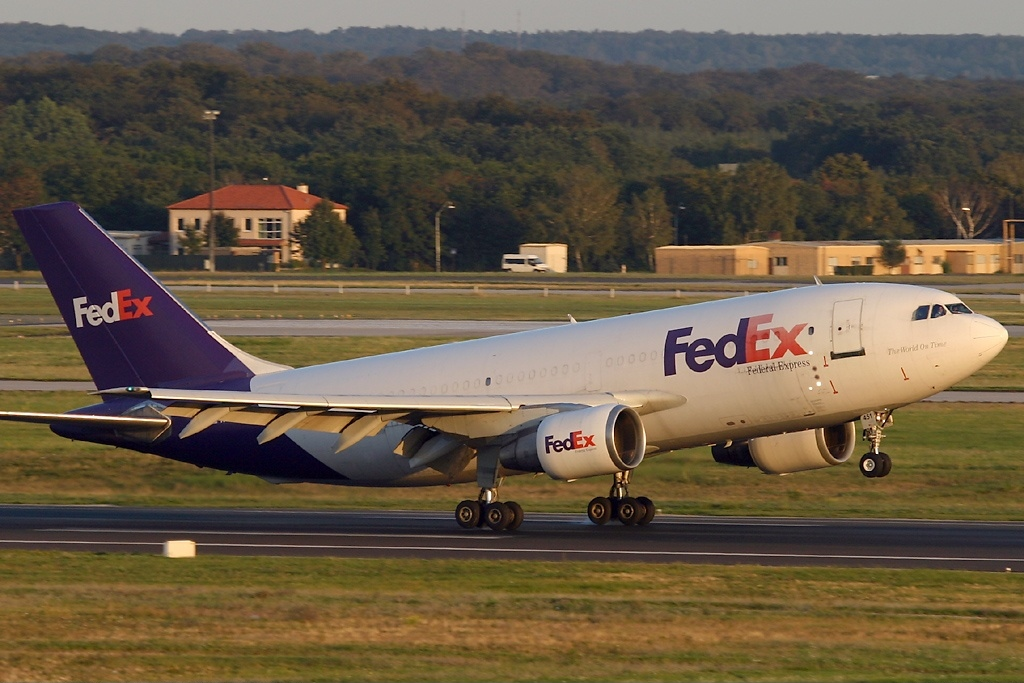
N451FE, a Airbus A310-200F pictured in 2004

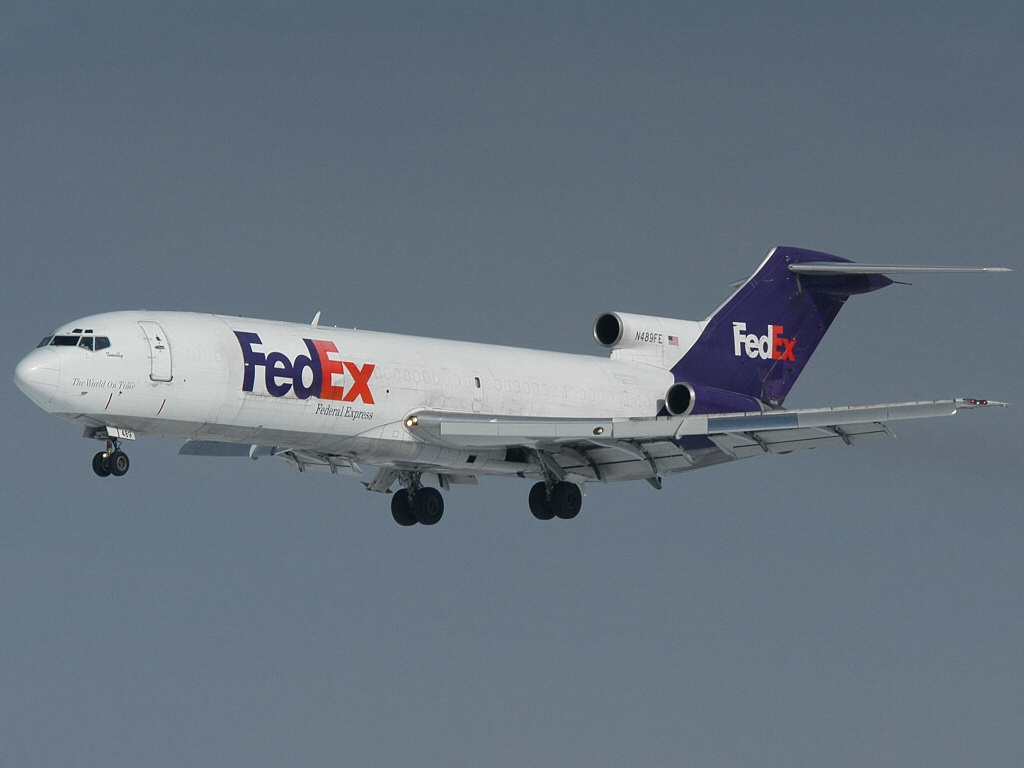
N489FE, a Boeing 727-200F pictured in 2006

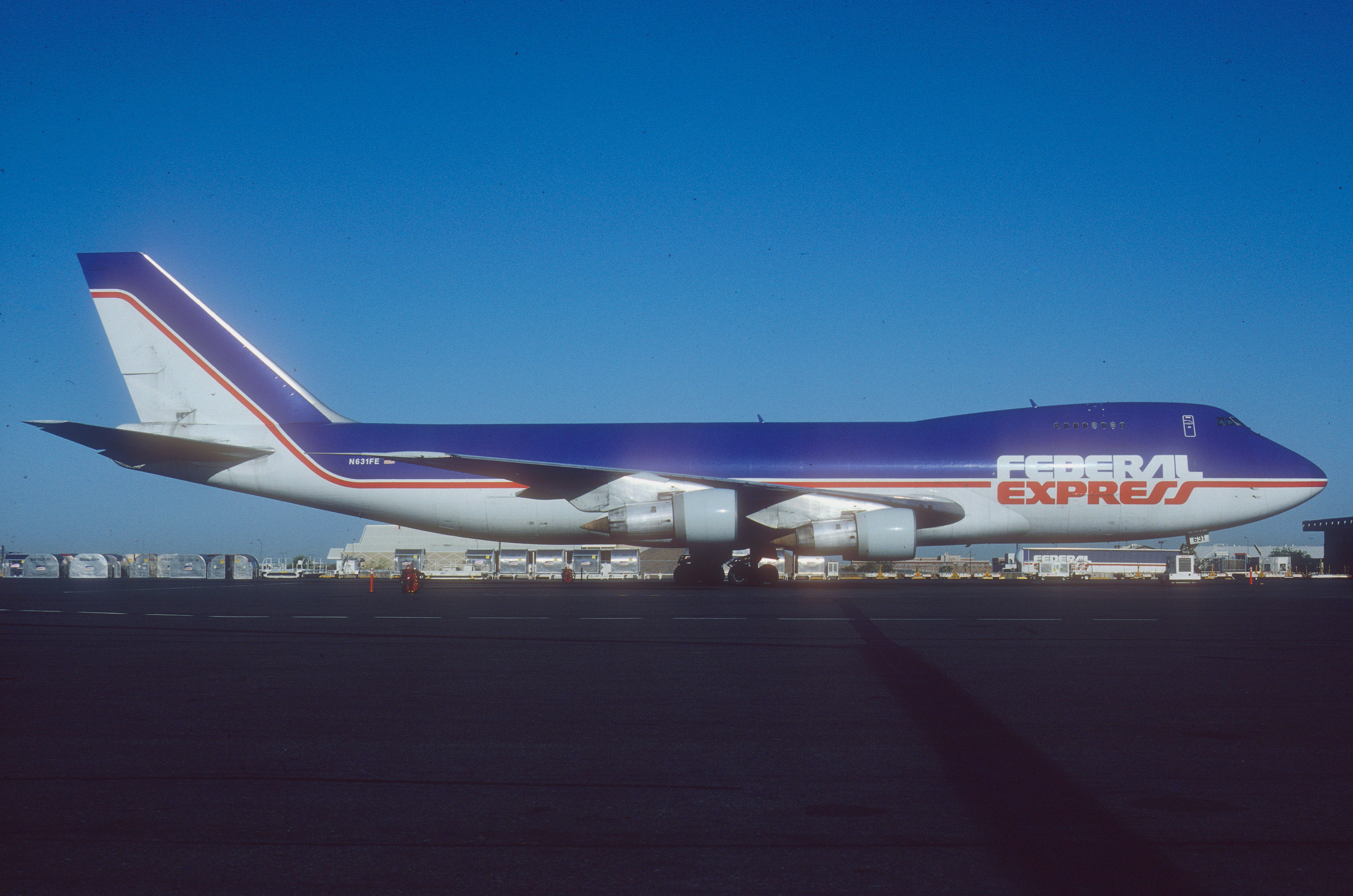
N631FE, the only 747 ever painted in full Federal Express livery

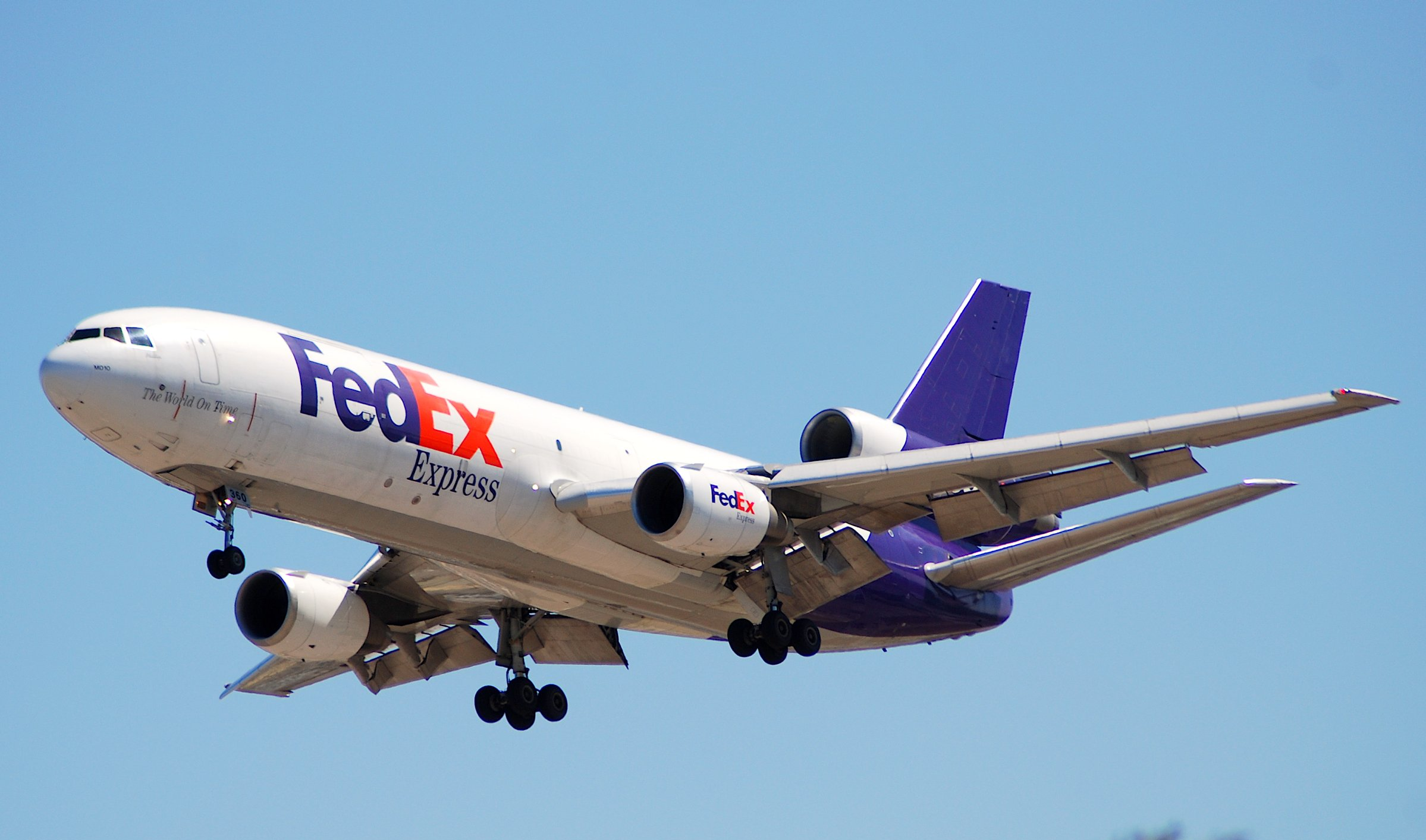
N360FE, a McDonnell Douglas MD-10-30F pictured in 2007

== FedEx Feeder ==
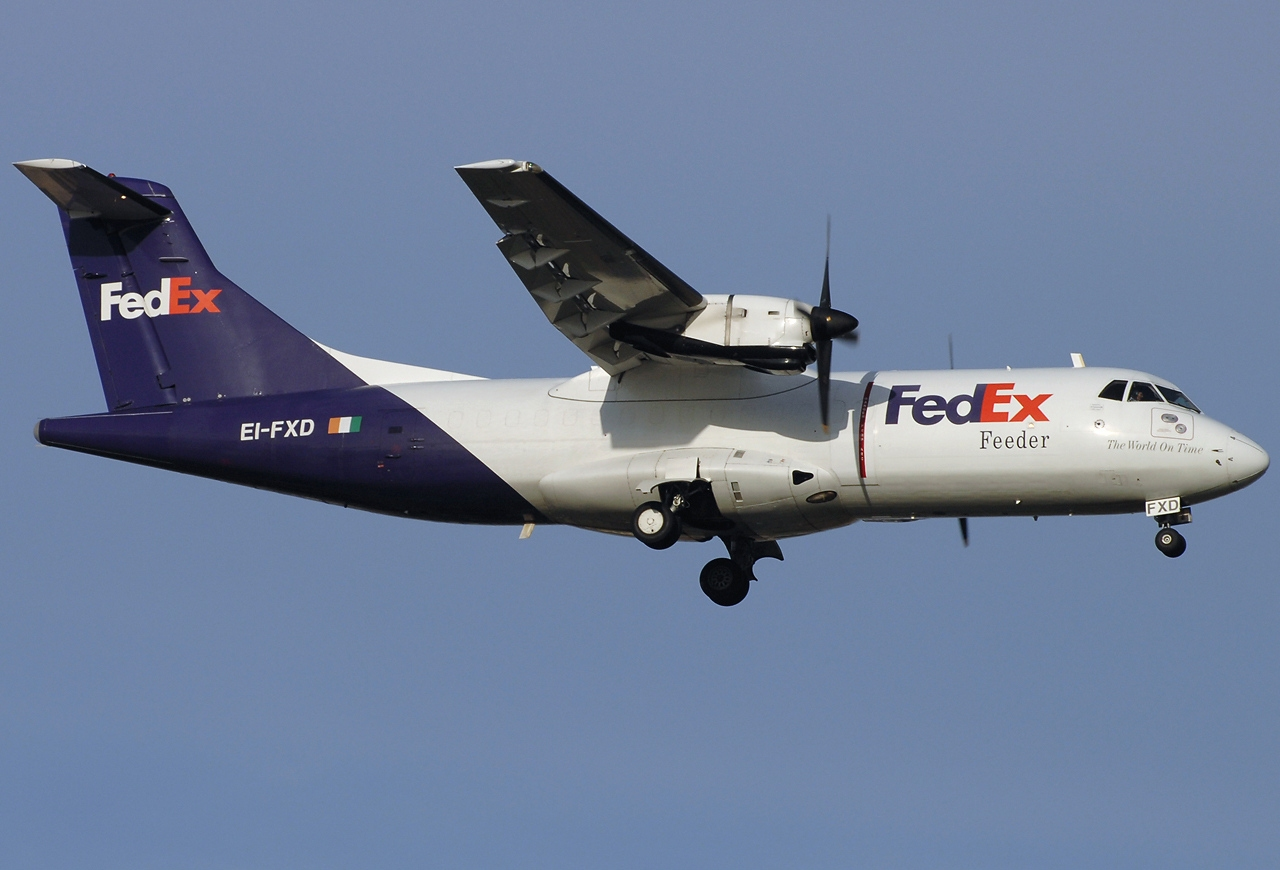
A freighter-configured ATR 42-300, operated by ASL Airlines Ireland

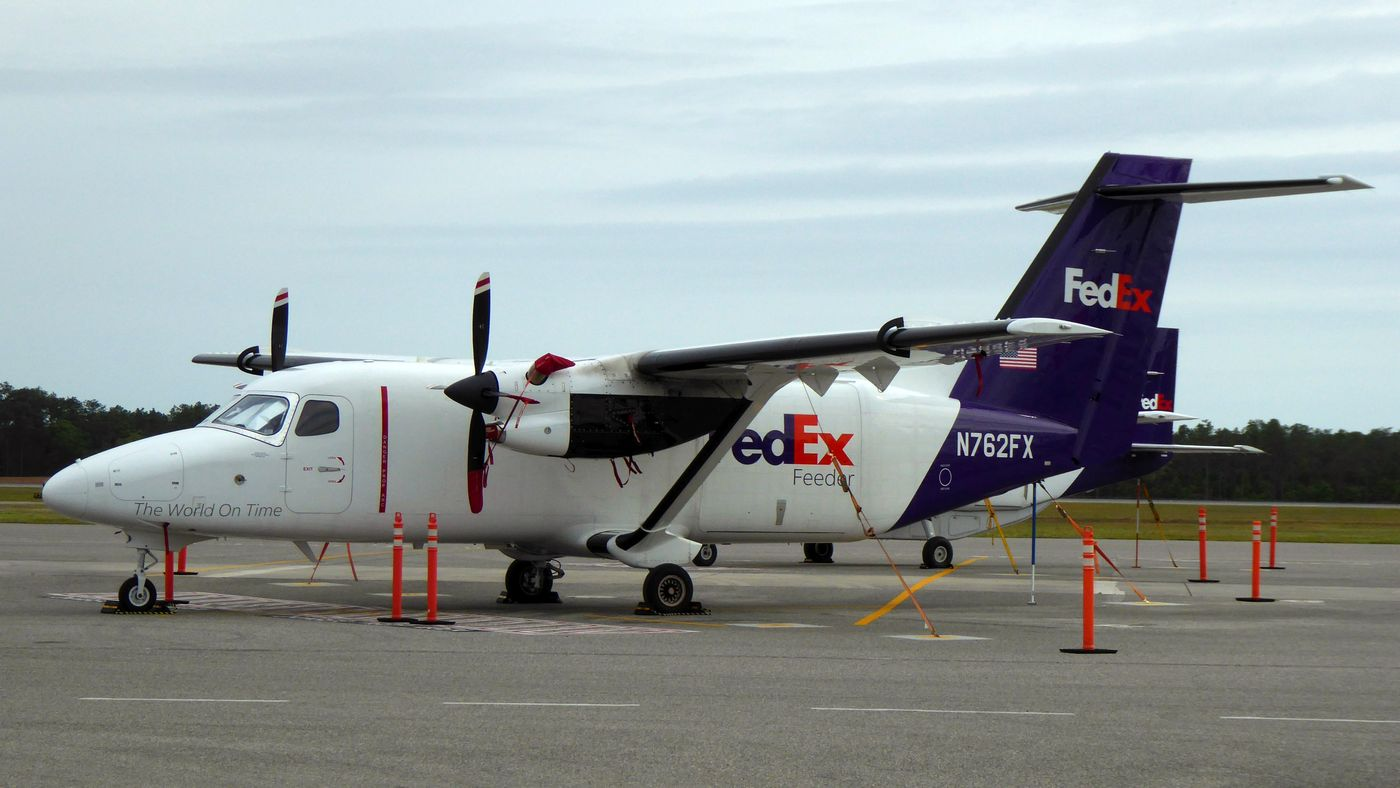
Cessna 408 SkyCourier owned by FedEx Feeder and operated by Mountain Air Cargo

FedEx Feeder is the branding applied to smaller FedEx Express propeller-driven aircraft that feed packages to and from airports served by larger jet aircraft.

In the United States, FedEx Express operates FedEx Feeder on a dry lease program where contractors rent aircraft from FedEx to operate routes as assigned by the company. The contractor is responsible for providing a crew to operate the aircraft and coordinating all maintenance. In exchange, FedEx pays a monthly administrative fee and reimburses the contractor for any expenses related to the operation and maintenance of the aircraft. Because the aircraft is owned by FedEx, it may not be used by the contractor for any purpose other than necessary for operating FedEx Feeder routes assigned to it.

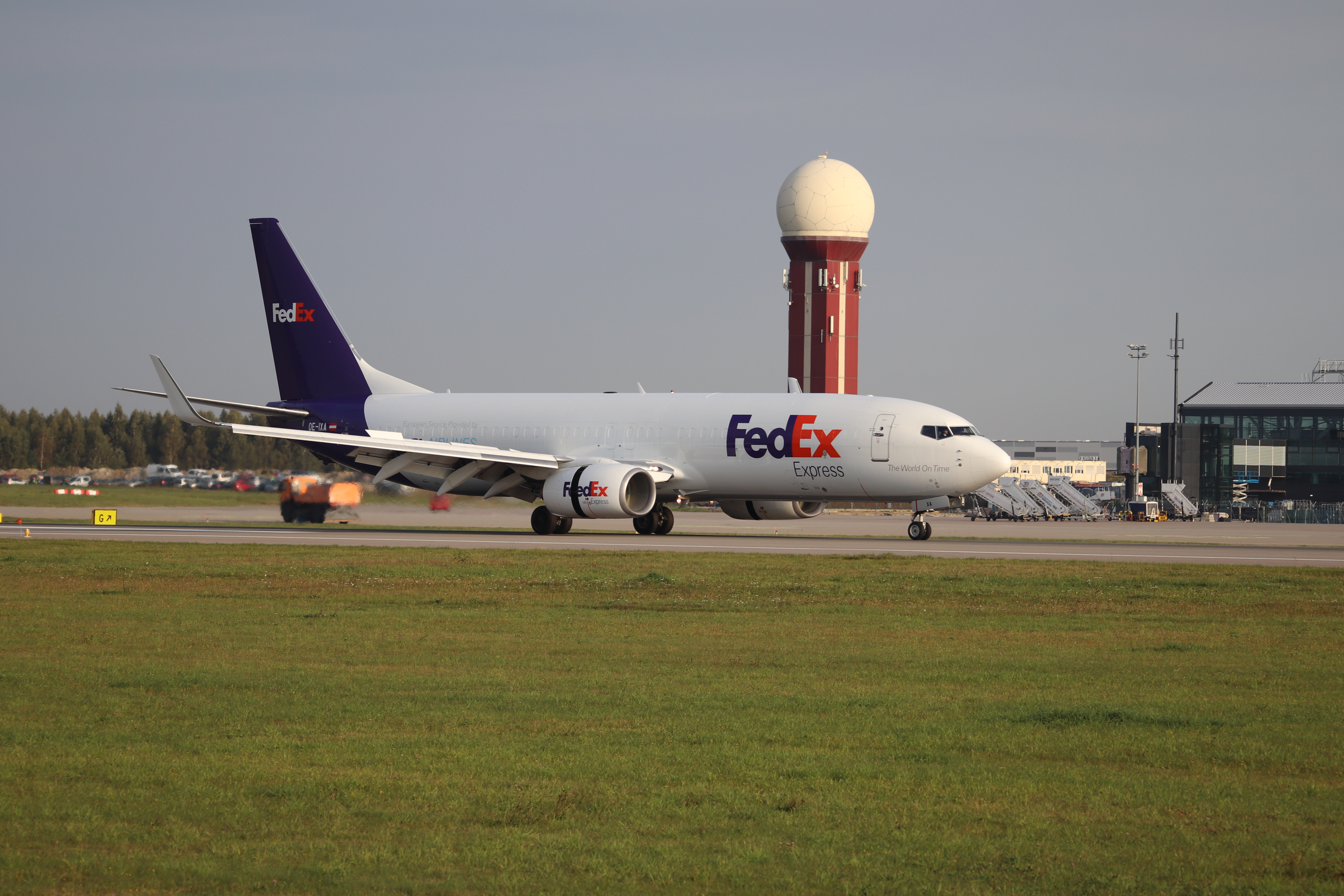
A Boeing 737-800 operated by ASL Airlines Belgium for FedEx Express

Outside the United States, contractors operating FedEx Feeder routes may sometimes fly their own aircraft. In that case, the aircraft may not be in the FedEx Feeder livery and the contractor may be able to carry cargo for other companies with the FedEx cargo.

List of contract carriers:

- ASL Airlines Belgium
- ASL Airlines Ireland (largest contractor, European partner)
- Airwork
- Baron Aviation Services
- Cargojet
- Carson Air (regional routes in Western Canada)
- Corporate Air
- CSA Air
- Empire Airlines
- IFL Group
- Merlin Airways
- Morningstar Air Express (also operates mainline FedEx service within Canada)
- Mountain Air Cargo
- Solinair
- Swiftair
- West Air Inc.

== Environmental initiatives ==
=== Delivery fleet ===
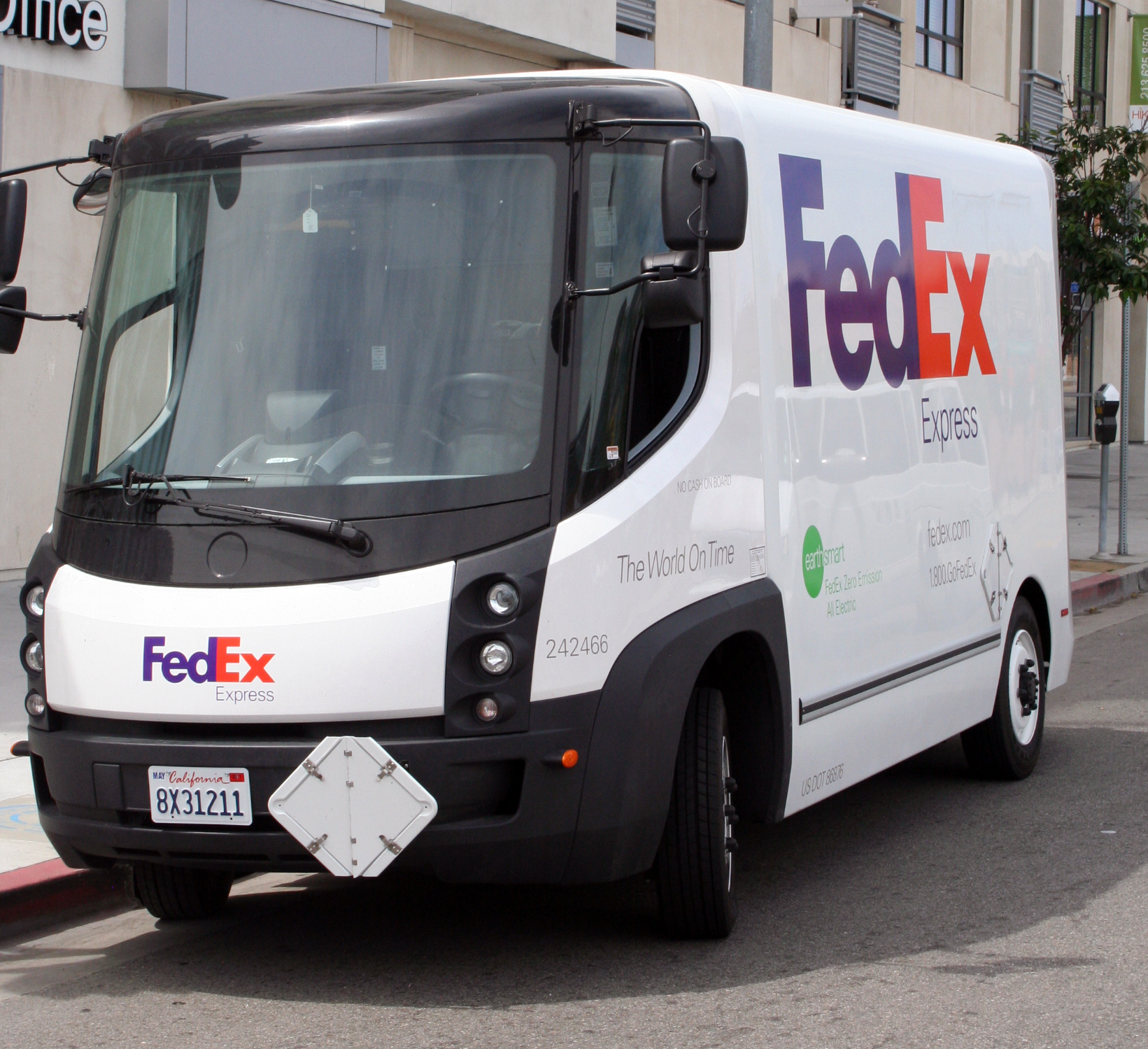
Navistar eStar all-electric van in Los Angeles in 2010. The EV was manufactured in the U.S. under license from Modec.

In 2003, FedEx Express introduced hybrid electric/ trucks into its fleet. At the time, the company had hoped to replace its entire 30,000 W700 delivery truck fleet with the hybrid, but in June 2009, only 170 were on the road. 93 of these operated in the United States in New York, Tampa, Sacramento, and Washington, D.C.; while the rest operated in Tokyo, Toronto, and Turin. FedEx blamed the low number on a lack of investment from other major companies in hybrid technology. It had hoped that other companies would order hybrid trucks, and that tax credits would be issued by the United States government to reduce the cost.

FedEx claimed that the hybrid truck in the 2003 test decreased soot by 96% and emissions by 65%. It also claimed that the truck achieved more than 50% better fuel consumption while still having the same cargo capacity as a conventional truck.

In 2009, FedEx Express partnered with Iveco and started a new test program of hybrid electric/diesel vans. The test program consisted of ten hybrid vans deployed in the Italian cities of Milan and Turin. FedEx claimed the new vans would have a 26.5% reduction in fuel consumption and a decrease in carbon dioxide emissions of 7.5 tons when compared to FedEx's standard vehicle. The trial was set to conclude in May 2010 and FedEx would then evaluate if the vans should be deployed on a larger scale.

In July 2009, FedEx Express partnered with Freightliner and Eaton Corporation to convert 92 delivery trucks into hybrids. The conversions boosted FedEx's fleet of hybrid-electric vehicles by more than 50 percent to 264. The trucks were placed into service in California, in Los Angeles, San Diego and San Francisco.

In November 2009, FedEx Express purchased 51 gasoline-electric hybrid vehicles from Azure Dynamics, to be put into service in The Bronx, New York City. The Bronx became FedEx's first all hybrid station. The addition would bring FedEx Express' fleet of hybrid electric and electric vehicles to 325.

=== Aircraft modernization ===
FedEx Express, like most cargo airlines, operates a fleet of older and less efficient aircraft when compared to passenger airlines. However, the company has been making an effort to phase out older aircraft, especially its trijets, and replace them with newer twin-jet models.

The trijet Boeing 727 was replaced in 2013 with the twin-jet Boeing 757; which the company says is more fuel-efficient. A portion of the Boeing 727s were donated to flight schools.

Since 2013, FedEx has been purchasing new built 767 and 777 freighters, taking advantage of lower pricing as Boeing worked to replace both models. The purchase set off a major shuffle in the FedEx fleet. The 777 aircraft have replaced the older trijet MD-11 on long-range, international routes, freeing up the MD-11 fleet to fly shorter routes. That move allowed the old tri-jet DC-10 aircraft to be retired in 2023. The new planes also allowed the older, smaller Airbus A310 freighters to be retired in 2020. As more planes are delivered through 2025, FedEx plans to retire the remaining MD-11 aircraft, along with some Airbus A300 freighters.

== Major incidents and accidents ==
Over the history of Federal Express and FedEx Express, there have been eight incidents in its mainline fleet, plus an attempted hijacking, two deaths and eight aircraft hull losses. This table only lists mainline fleet crashes that happened under FedEx Express' direct operations, and does not list either crashes related to the FedEx Feeder fleet, or incidents or accidents associated with the Flying Tiger Line after its acquisition by Federal Express until its operations were fully merged with Federal Express.

705	April 7, 1994	N306FE	McDonnell Douglas DC-10-30	0/4	Auburn Calloway, a Federal Express pilot (and former military pilot) facing possible termination for inconsistencies in his claimed prior experience, attempted to hijack the aircraft and crash it. He intended to make the crash appear as an accident in order for his family to receive his Federal Express insurance money. The crew of Flight 705 were able to subdue Calloway and land the aircraft safely. The crew's injuries disabled them from flying professionally ever again. Calloway was eventually sentenced to two life sentences in prison. The aircraft was repaired and returned to service.
1406	September 5, 1996	N68055	McDonnell Douglas DC-10-10	0/5	Bound for Logan International Airport, the aircraft experienced an in-flight fire in the cabin cargo compartment, and diverted to Stewart International Airport in Newburgh, New York to make an emergency landing. After landing, the fire consumed the aircraft.
14	July 31, 1997	N611FE	McDonnell Douglas MD-11	0/5	Arriving at Newark Liberty International Airport from Anchorage International Airport at the end of a scheduled flight, the number 3 (right-side) engine contacted the runway during a rough landing which caused the aircraft to flip over. The crew escaped through a cockpit window before the aircraft was destroyed in the ensuing fire.
087	October 17, 1999	N581FE	McDonnell Douglas MD-11	0/2	Upon landing at Subic Bay International Airport from Shanghai Hongqiao International Airport, the aircraft overran the whole length of the runway and plunged into the bay where it was completely submerged. It was subsequently written off.
1478	July 26, 2002	N497FE	Boeing 727-232	0/3	On final approach to Tallahassee International Airport (then known as Tallahassee Regional Airport) from Memphis International Airport, the aircraft's landing gear hit a tree about 70 feet (21 m) high and 3,650 feet (1,110 m) short of the runway which caused it to crash into the trees and open field short of the runway into parked construction vehicles, coming to rest about 1,000 feet short of the runway and facing in the opposite direction of its flight path. The aircraft was destroyed in the ensuing fire.
647	December 18, 2003	N364FE	McDonnell Douglas MD-10-10	0/7	After landing at Memphis International Airport from Metropolitan Oakland International Airport, the right main landing gear collapsed and caused the aircraft to veer off the runway. The aircraft was destroyed in the subsequent fire.
630	July 28, 2006	N391FE	McDonnell Douglas MD-10-10	0/3	After landing at Memphis International Airport following a flight from Seattle-Tacoma International Airport, the left main landing gear collapsed. Following the landing gear failure, the number 1 (left-side) engine contacted the runway and caused a small fire and structural damage to the aircraft. The aircraft was written off.
80	March 23, 2009	N526FE	McDonnell Douglas MD-11	2/2	The first fatal accident in the mainline history of FedEx Express, this aircraft suffered multiple bounced landings on its nose before crashing at Narita International Airport while landing in windy conditions. The aircraft touched down and bounced on its nose gear back into the air, coming down again on its nose gear before bouncing back up. The nose gear impacted one final time before the aircraft banked to the left and the wing clipped the ground. The aircraft burst into flames and came to rest upside down, killing both the captain and first officer, the only occupants.
910	October 28, 2016	N370FE	McDonnell Douglas MD-10-10	0/2	Upon landing on Runway 10L at Fort Lauderdale–Hollywood International Airport, the left main landing gear collapsed due to fatigue cracking. The aircraft's left wing then caught fire and continued down the runway, scraping on the left engine cowling, before coming to a stop approximately 6,600 feet (2,000 m) down the runway. The aircraft was written off.

== Northrop Grumman Guardian ==
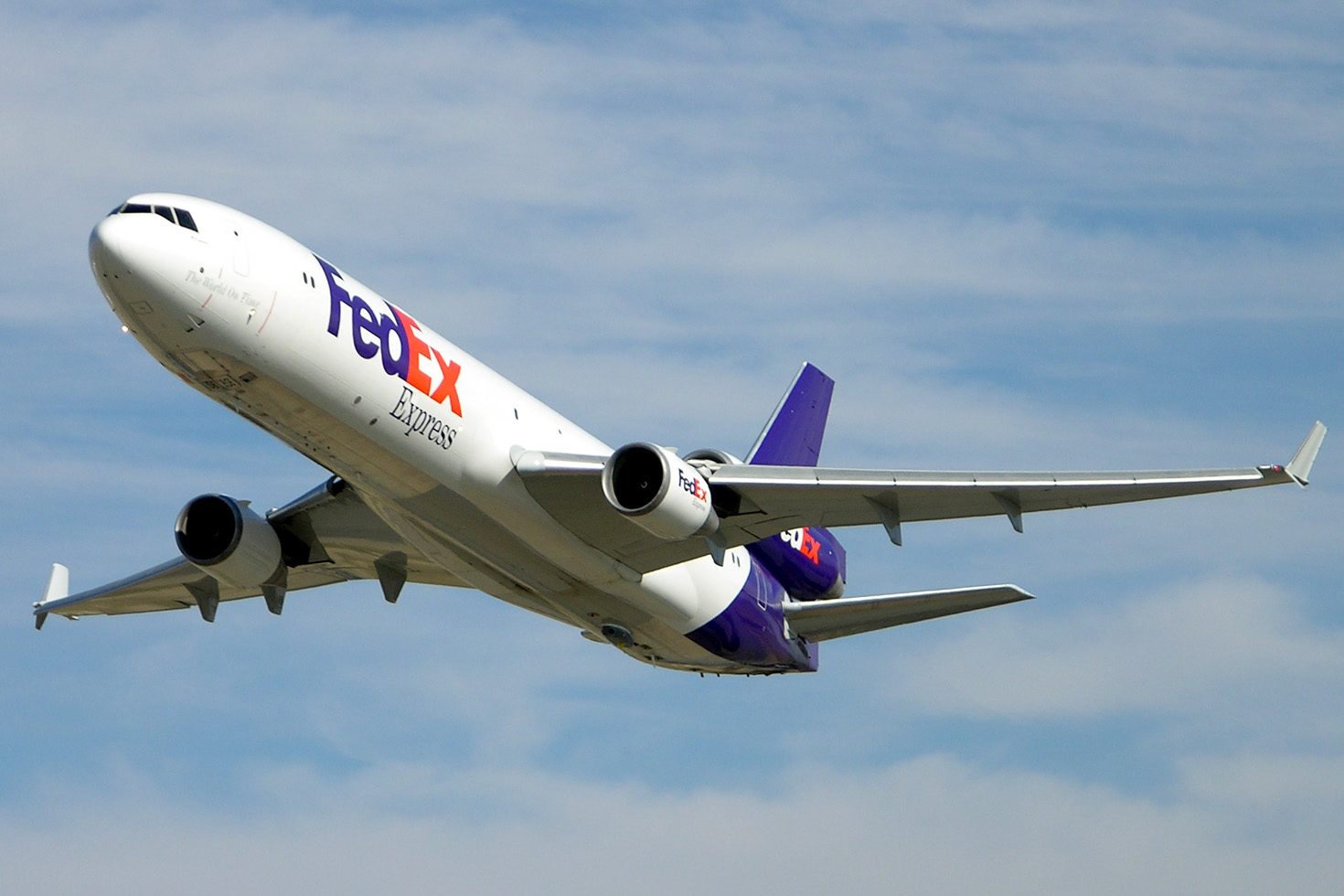
A McDonnell Douglas MD-11 during a test flight of the Guardian, which can be seen mounted to the belly aft of the wings

In 2003, FedEx Express partnered with the Department of Homeland Security and Northrop Grumman to develop and flight test an anti-missile system, the Northrop Grumman Guardian. It is intended that this system could be deployed on commercial airliners to protect them from terrorist attacks such as the attempted shootdown of a DHL Airbus A300 in 2003. FedEx supplied an MD-11 and a leased Boeing 747 for the flight test phase.

FedEx Express became the first air carrier to deploy the Guardian on a commercial flight in September 2006, when it equipped an MD-11 freighter with the pod. By December 2007, the company had nine aircraft equipped with the system for further testing and evaluation. Because of the program's success, the U.S. Congress directed DHS to extend it to passenger-carrying aircraft.

== Sorting facilities ==
Americas

- United States
  - Anchorage, AK – International transit hub
  - Fort Worth, TX – Southwest hub
  - Greensboro, NC – Mid-Atlantic hub
  - Indianapolis, IN – National hub
  - Miami, FL – Latin America hub
  - Memphis, TN – Global "Superhub"
  - Newark, NJ – East Coast hub
  - Oakland, CA – West Coast hub

Asia

- China
  - Guangzhou
- Hong Kong
  - Hong Kong
- Japan
  - Osaka–Kansai
  - Tokyo–Narita
- Taiwan
  - Taipei–Taoyuan
- United Arab Emirates
  - Dubai–International

Europe

- France
  - Paris–Charles de Gaulle
- Belgium
  - Liege – Intra-Europe hub
- Germany
  - Cologne/Bonn
- United Kingdom
  - London–Stansted

== See also ==
- Air transportation in the United States
- Aviation
- DHL Aviation
- FedEx Corporation
- List of airlines of the United States
- List of airports in the United States
- TNT Airways
- Transportation in the United States
- UPS Airlines
- USPS
