= FedEx Express Flight 1478 =

2002 aviation accident in Florida

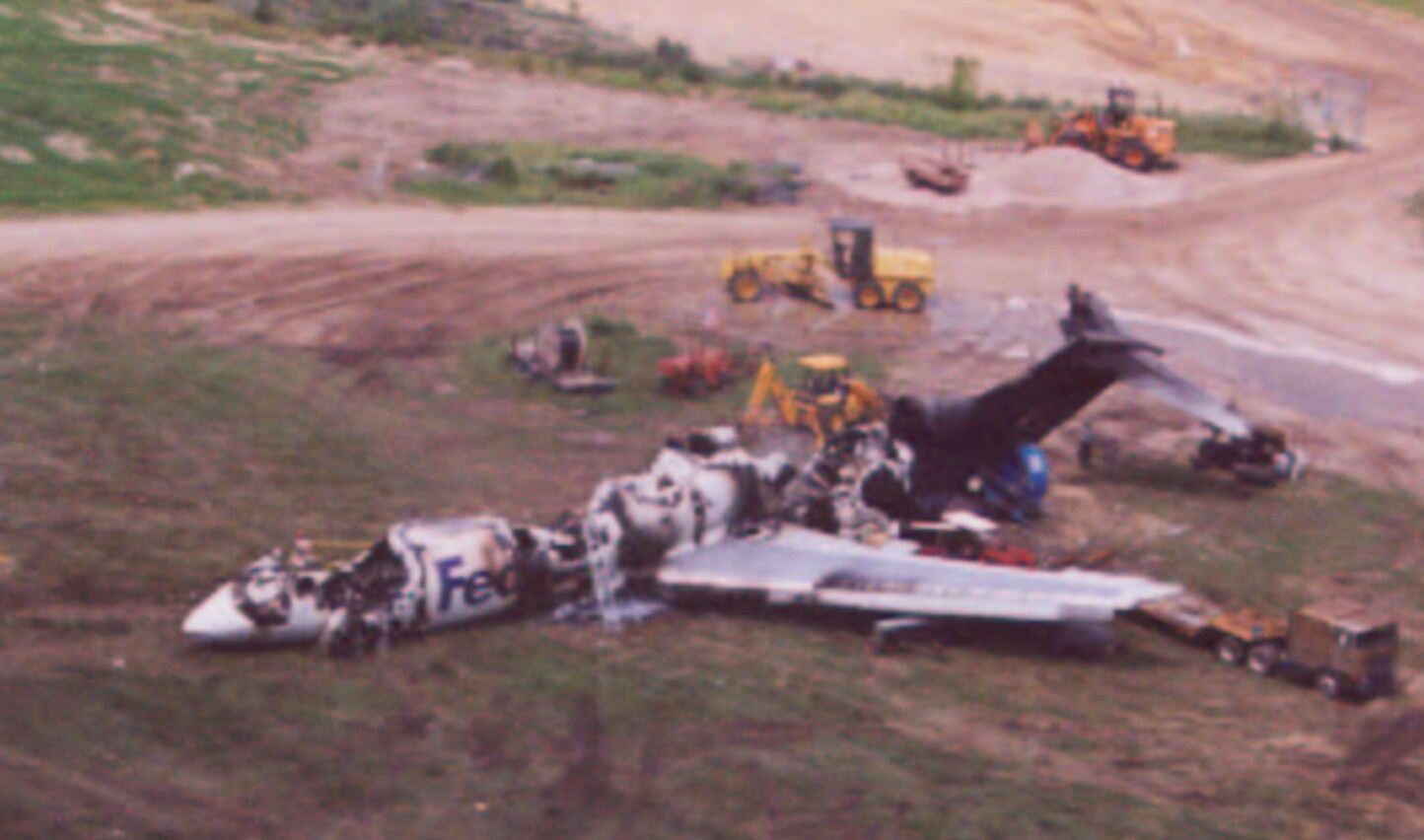
- Wreckage of the aircraft

Accident
- Date: July 26, 2002
- Summary: Controlled flight into terrain
- Site: Near Tallahassee International Airport, Florida, United States

Aircraft
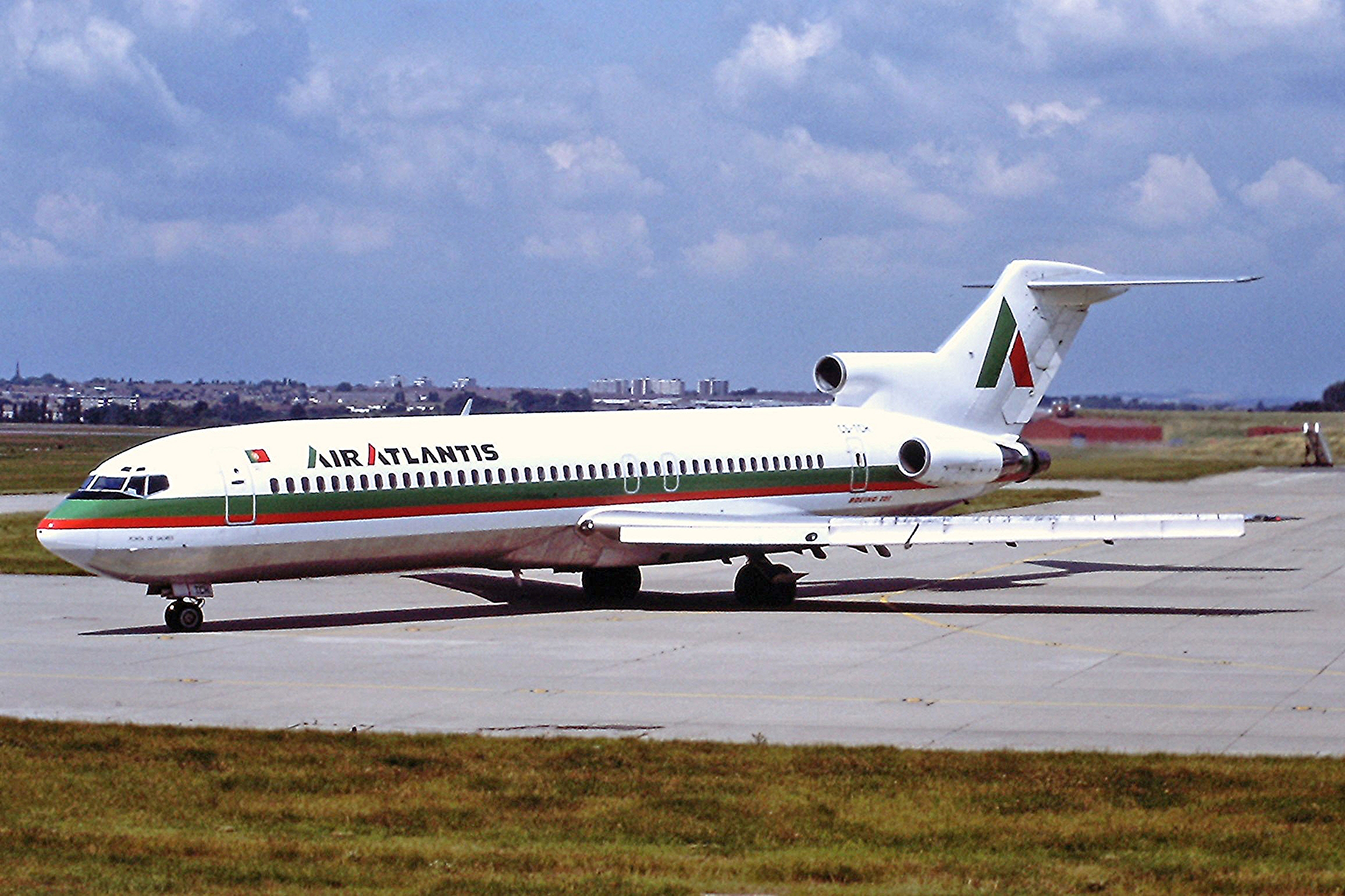
- The aircraft involved in the accident, photographed in 1987 while in service with Air Atlantis
- Aircraft type: Boeing 727-232F
- Operator: FedEx Express
- IATA flight No.: FX1478
- ICAO flight No.: FDX1478
- Call sign: FEDEX 1478
- Registration: N497FE
- Flight origin: Memphis International Airport, Tennessee
- Destination: Tallahassee International Airport, Tallahassee, Florida
- Occupants: 3
- Crew: 3
- Fatalities: 0
- Injuries: 3
- Survivors: 3

FedEx Express Flight 1478 was a scheduled domestic cargo flight from Memphis International Airport, Tennessee, to Tallahassee International Airport, Florida. On July 26, 2002, the Boeing 727-232F aircraft flying this route crashed during landing at Tallahassee. All three flight crew members survived the accident with serious injuries, but the aircraft was destroyed.

== Aircraft and crew ==
The aircraft involved was a Boeing 727-232 freighter registered as N497FE that had its first flight on September 3, 1974. The aircraft was delivered to Delta Air Lines in 1974, and was sold to FedEx in 1986. On December 13, 1989, it was converted into a freighter.

The three flight crew members were the aircraft's only occupants. The captain was 55-year-old William Walsh who had been with FedEx Express since 1989 and had a total of 13,000 to 14,000 hours of flight experience, including 2,754 hours on the Boeing 727. His latest medical certificate issued by the Federal Aviation Administration (FAA) required him to wear corrective lenses in flight.

The first officer was 44-year-old William Frye, who had been with FedEx Express since 1997, having previously served as a United States Navy pilot for 16 years. He had 8,500 flight hours, with 1,983 of them on the Boeing 727. According to his recent medical certificate, Frye was color blind but passed the Navy's color vision tests a total of 13 times.

The flight engineer was 33-year-old David Mendez, who had been with FedEx Express for less than a year and had 2,600 flight hours, including 346 hours on the Boeing 727.

== Accident ==
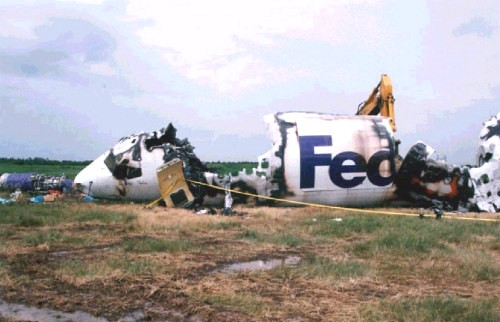
Wreckage of the left forward fuselage and cockpit

Flight 1478 departed at 4:12 AM EDT, with first officer Frye as the pilot flying. The flight was initially intending to land on runway 27 due to wind gusts. However, after receiving a weather update at 5:24, the flight crew changed to a straight-in visual approach to Runway 09. Since the air traffic control (ATC) tower at Tallahassee did not open until 6:00, Flight 1478 was monitored by air traffic controllers in Jacksonville.

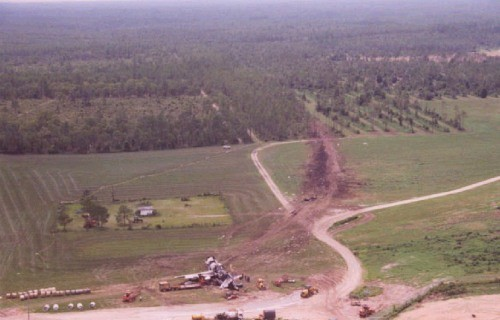
Aerial view of the crash site, with the trees that were impacted in the distance, and the wreckage of the 727 in the foreground.

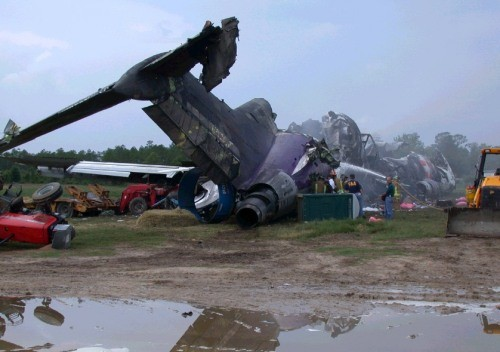
Wreckage of the tail section

At 5:30, first officer Frye said, "Okay, I think I got a runway now." The flight crew then discussed the runway and the position of the aircraft. At 5:36, Flight 1478 was descending through an altitude of 1,000 feet (300 m) and turning towards runway 09 from the airfield traffic pattern. At this time the precision approach path indicator (PAPI) lights displayed one red light and three white lights. The aircraft was slightly low at the final approach fix, but the crew failed to notice. 30 seconds before impact the aircraft was at 500 feet (150 m), all four PAPI lights were red, indicating the aircraft was well below the glideslope. At the same time the ground proximity warning system (GPWS) sounded a "five hundred" feet above ground level warning. Captain Walsh responded, "Stable" while first officer Frye said "Gonna have to stay just a little bit higher... I'm gonna lose the end of the runway." At 5:37, with the landing gear lowered and the flaps at 30 degrees, the aircraft impacted 50-foot (15 m)-high trees located 3,650 feet (1,110 m) short of the runway. The aircraft remained airborne for 1,000 feet (300 m) and then crashed into the ground sliding 1,100 feet (340 m), striking a construction vehicle in the process and rotating 260 degrees before coming to a stop. Tallahassee International Airport was closed until 10:35.

== Investigation ==
The National Transportation Safety Board (NTSB) conducted an investigation into the accident, determining that the cause of the accident was the flight crew's failure to maintain an appropriate flight path during a visual approach at night. The flight crew were also fatigued and did not adhere to standard operating procedures (SOP).

The flight crew testified the approach was normal until the last moment, and none of the crew verbalized that all four PAPIs were red. The approach was not stabilized by 500 feet (150 m) above ground level and the flight crew failed to initiate a go-around. First officer Frye also underwent an eye test after the accident, revealing that it was difficult for him to distinguish between red, green and white. The NTSB concluded that based on those results, this made it difficult for Frye to distinguish between the color of the PAPI lights.

== See also ==
- American Airlines Flight 965- A Boeing 757-223 which crashed near Buga, Valle del Cauca, Colombia due to navigational error; 159 fatalities.
- Corporate Airlines Flight 5966- A British Aerospace Jetstream 32 which crashed into terrain during approach; 13 fatalities.
- Korean Air Flight 801- A Boeing 747-3B5 which crashed on approach due to pilot and navigational system error; 229 fatalities.
