= Ron Ponder =

Ron J Ponder
- Born: February 21, 1943 (age 83); El Dorado, Arkansas, US
- Education: Louisiana Tech University; Mississippi State University
- Occupation: Founder of The Ponder Group
- Awards: Smithsonian Award Stevie Awards

Ron J. Ponder (born February 21, 1943) is a senior information technology executive. He has held senior leadership positions at Federal Express, Sprint, AT&T, and Cap Gemini Ernst & Young

One of the first global Chief Information Officer (CIO)s his career has spanned several Industries, helping Federal Express introduce its worldwide package tracking and tracing systems, overseeing the operation and modernization of both Sprint and AT&T's voice and data networks as well as their product development, Billing, Marketing and Customer Service systems.

In 2006, Ponder founded and currently leads an information technology consulting firm, formed by him and several of his former business associates. The group specializes in managing large-scale business and government technology program implementations, information technology group transformations and providing leadership on troubled projects.

== Early life ==
Ponder was born in El Dorado, Arkansas. Shortly after his birth, his father died and his mother, a telephone operator, returned with him to the family farm. Ponder was raised by his mother and grandparents who owned a sizable farm, general store, feed business and service station. Starting at a very young age, and continuing through his college years, he worked closely with his grandfather in the family business.

When Ponder was in high school, his mother remarried and the family moved to Magnolia, Arkansas, where he completed high school and college. After completing his undergraduate work in industrial management and engineering, scholarships eventually led him to both Louisiana Tech University for an MBA and Mississippi State University, where he completed his doctorate in business administration. He majored in operations research and computer science, the latter a fairly new and embryonic field of study.

== Education ==
Upon completing his work for his Doctoral Degree, Ponder stayed and taught in the College of Business and Industry at Mississippi State University for the next year.

From there, he went to Georgia State University in Atlanta as a university professor in the College of Business and Quantitative Methods. He left Georgia State to join the College of Business and Industry at the University of Memphis, where he taught quantitative management, statistical decision theory and applied programming languages. He was a professor at the University of Memphis for five years.

During this time, at the University of Memphis, he was consulting part-time with companies in the area when he met his new neighbor, a young pilot for a fledgling new cargo airline named Federal Express. After some discussion, the pilot suggested that Ponder should meet Charles Brandon and Frederick W. Smith, the founder and CEO. Their association led Ponder to two years of consulting for Brandon and Smith at Federal Express in the early 1970s, performing operations research for the company. As the funds ran out, Ponder and one of his graduate student assistants completed their last project pro bono.

== Employment ==
In 1975 Ponder and accepted a full-time position with Helena Chemical Company, a multi-billion-dollar agricultural chemical distributor headquartered in Memphis. As director of data processing for the company, Ponder began to build experience in information technology.

In July of his second year at Helena Chemical, two former colleagues from Federal Express were finally able to fund a position for Ponder as director of operations research. Ponder eventually assembled a team of 22 operations research staff. Throughout his career at Federal Express, Ponder was responsible for system strategies, systems simulation and network planning that went with it.

In 1979, Ponder was promoted to the position of vice president, operations planning. In addition to his staff responsibilities in this role, he also had the opportunity to work closely with Smith and COO, James L. Barksdale. As a result, he became a lead member of the senior team that conceived, designed and deployed FedEx's electronic package tracking and tracing system. This was a technological breakthrough and key strategic differentiator for the company. The system became the benchmark for FedEx's competitors; won numerous technical and business awards; and was described in business articles and Harvard Business School case studies as a model for the strategic application of technology to create market and competitive differentiation.

While in this position, he also led a major expansion of the company's package sorting facility in Memphis. In 1982, Ponder was promoted to the position of senior vice president and chief information officer (CIO), a position he held for the next decade. Ponder was also part of the senior team instrumental in initiating and implementing the company's quality programs. These programs culminated with the company being awarded the Malcolm Baldrige National Quality Award in 1990

From 1991 to 1993 Ponder worked at Sprint Communications Company as executive vice president and CIO and led the team that created the first network based on optical technology. He was also responsible for information technology and reengineering for Sprint's local and long-distance business, leading several company-wide efforts that improved Sprint's technology and network infrastructure, cost position, and time to market.

In 1993, he was offered the position of senior vice president and worldwide CIO of AT&T. While AT&T enjoyed enormous wealth and influence, its information technology and network systems were surprisingly lacking. Shortly after joining AT&T, he became executive vice president of operations and Service Management responsible for a good portion of its customer operations, including customer service, AT&T's voice and data networks as well as the company's information technology and development organizations While at AT&T Ponder transformed the entire information systems organization, consolidating data centres, implementing a corporate network worldwide, standardizing technology and changing the culture of the organization to be customer focused. During this period he assisted in planning the divestiture and spin out of AT&T Computer Systems back into NCR Corporation and AT&T Network Systems which became Lucent Technologies.

Ponder also led changes in the company that were fundamental to AT&T's network evolution to address capacity and modernization of their infrastructure.

He brought together a team of CIOs to manage the various business units' systems. This group developed the AT&T Foundation Architecture, the company's first framework that enabled system and data networks to integrate, consolidate and standardize information globally.

In 1996 AT&T had been so thoroughly altered by combinations of court decree, market and political forces that Ponder was wooed away by a new set of challenges. He acquired a position as president and CEO of BDSI, a full-service consulting and systems development firm in New Jersey Under Ponder and his new team, the company thrived and grew at an astounding rate of 30 percent per annum. In 1999 the ownership, including Ponder, agreed to a very generous acquisition by The Cap Gemini Group. Ponder stayed on with the Cap Gemini Group to manage its US-based telecommunications, media and networks consulting businesses as president and CEO. In 2000, Cap Gemini acquired Ernst & Young's global consulting business, greatly increasing Ponder's operational responsibilities. Ponder remained with Cap Gemini Ernst & Young until 2002

== Awards and recognition ==
Ponder received the Smithsonian Award for Technology Excellence, the Carnegie Mellon Award for Innovative Technology and the Stevie Award for Technology Innovation.

He was also part of the leadership team at Federal Express to be awarded the first Baldridge Award to a services company. During his tenure at AT&T, he supported the work that led to AT&T receiving two Baldridge Awards. The Deming Quality Award was also awarded to the Global Network Group under his leadership at AT&T during the same time period.

In 1995, CIO Magazine published a 10th-anniversary issue "Decade of the CIO" and named Ponder as one of the 12 most influential technology executives of the past decade.

== Boards served ==
- Atlantic Health Systems
- Lincoln Financial Group
- Able Energy Corporation
- Boy Scouts of America – De Soto Council
- Christian Brothers University
- Board of Governors – Southern Arkansas University
- Board of Governors – Mississippi State University

== Education ==
- Bachelor of Business Administration – Southern Arkansas University
- Master of Business Administration – Louisiana Tech University
- Doctorate of Business Administration – Mississippi State University
