= Zapmail =

1980s fax delivery service by FedEx

- Type: Service
- Industry: Document Delivery, Fax Services
- Founded: 1984
- Founders: Federal Express (FedEx)
- Defunct: October 1986
- Headquarters: United States
- Area served: United States
- Services: Document delivery via fax
- Parent: FedEx

Zapmail was a service, launched in 1984 by Federal Express (FedEx) whereby fax transmission was offered to customers as a means to expedite delivery of documents. This was before the widespread availability and use of fax services in homes and businesses. Eventually judged a commercial failure, it was discontinued just over two years later.

== History ==
Zapmail was offered at two levels of service. When sending documents in low volumes for customers, FedEx would collect the document as normal, bring it to the local depot where it would be sent by fax to a depot near the recipient's address. There the document would be printed, packaged and delivered to its destination.

For higher volume users, FedEx would install a “Zapmailer” fax machine in the client's premises, usually in the mail room. To provide the fax network, FedEx had to invest heavily in fax machines from NEC, which at the time were expensive. Additionally, rather than use the PSTN public phone network, the documents were carried over the company's own packet-switched network, requiring still more investment.

The FedEx strategy was driven by an expectation that customers would pay a premium to have their documents delivered in hours instead of overnight. At the same time, by migrating document traffic from trucks and aircraft, significant savings could be made in the FedEx transportation network. These savings could later be used to offer discounted services to increase volumes and margins.

The Zapmailer did not conform to the ITU-T (formerly CCITT) specifications which had been developed for fax transmission over public networks. This meant the Zapmailer could not communicate with the growing numbers of Group 3 fax machines entering service. Large clients in particular, and later most others, were able to buy their own fax machines and transmit documents themselves. Once this began to happen, customers could see that it was more cost effective to buy their own machine rather than pay for regular Zapmail services. This remained true despite price reductions from $35 to $10 per ten pages.

Quality problems with both the equipment and the transmission lines led the company to stop taking orders in March 1986. At that time the company stated that losses had accumulated to $200m and that an equipment upgrade was required. It was also stated that the “last mile” transmission would be carried by satellite. This plan could not be realised due to the destruction of the Space Shuttle Challenger and the resulting grounding of the shuttle fleet. It was further announced in August that the upgraded equipment would be compatible with Group 3 fax standards.

By this time, machine deliveries from NEC numbered in the thousands while customers were only in the hundreds. It was decided the service was a commercial failure and it was discontinued in October. $320m was written off and the employees of the Zapmail service were re-deployed within the company.

== Drawbacks ==
- Color and high resolution images could not be transmitted
- Confidentiality – the uncovered documents had to be handled by FedEx employees at both ends of the fax transmission
- In some cases, there was customer confusion of how the service worked
- Fax machines, like many examples of electronic equipment, became affordable even for smaller companies
- Problems such as inability to transmit light toned originals and telephone line limitations persisted
- Because the service was still centered on the mailroom, often the speed advantage was lost in the internal mail system
- Machines were not compatible with public networks
