= Naval Mobile Construction Battalion 11 =

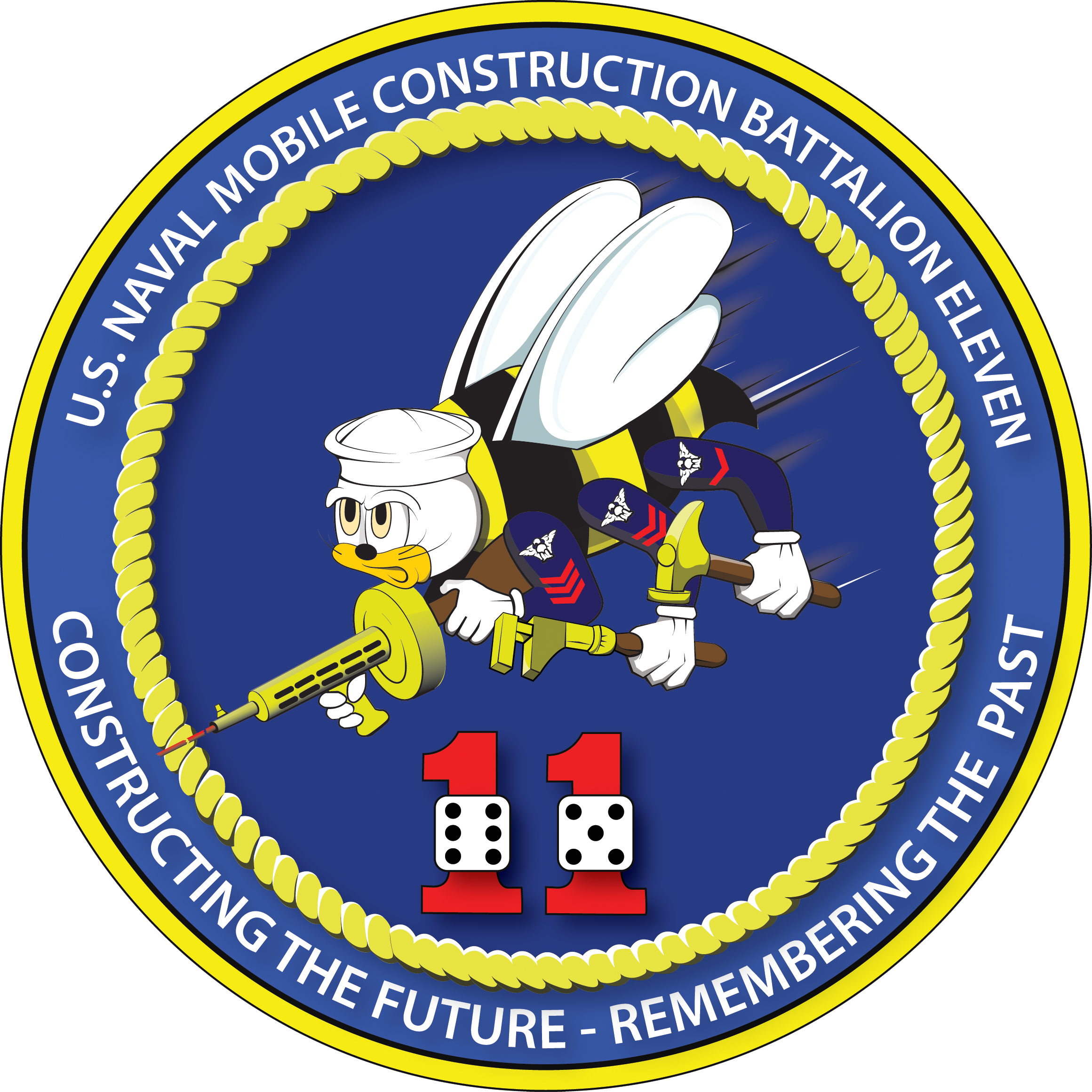
- Active: 1942–1945 1953–1969 2007–present
- Country: United States
- Branch: USN
- Homeport: Construction Battalion Center Gulfport
- Engagements: World War II; Vietnam War; Operation Enduring Freedom; Operation Iraqi Freedom

Commanders
- Current commander: CAPT James Angerman

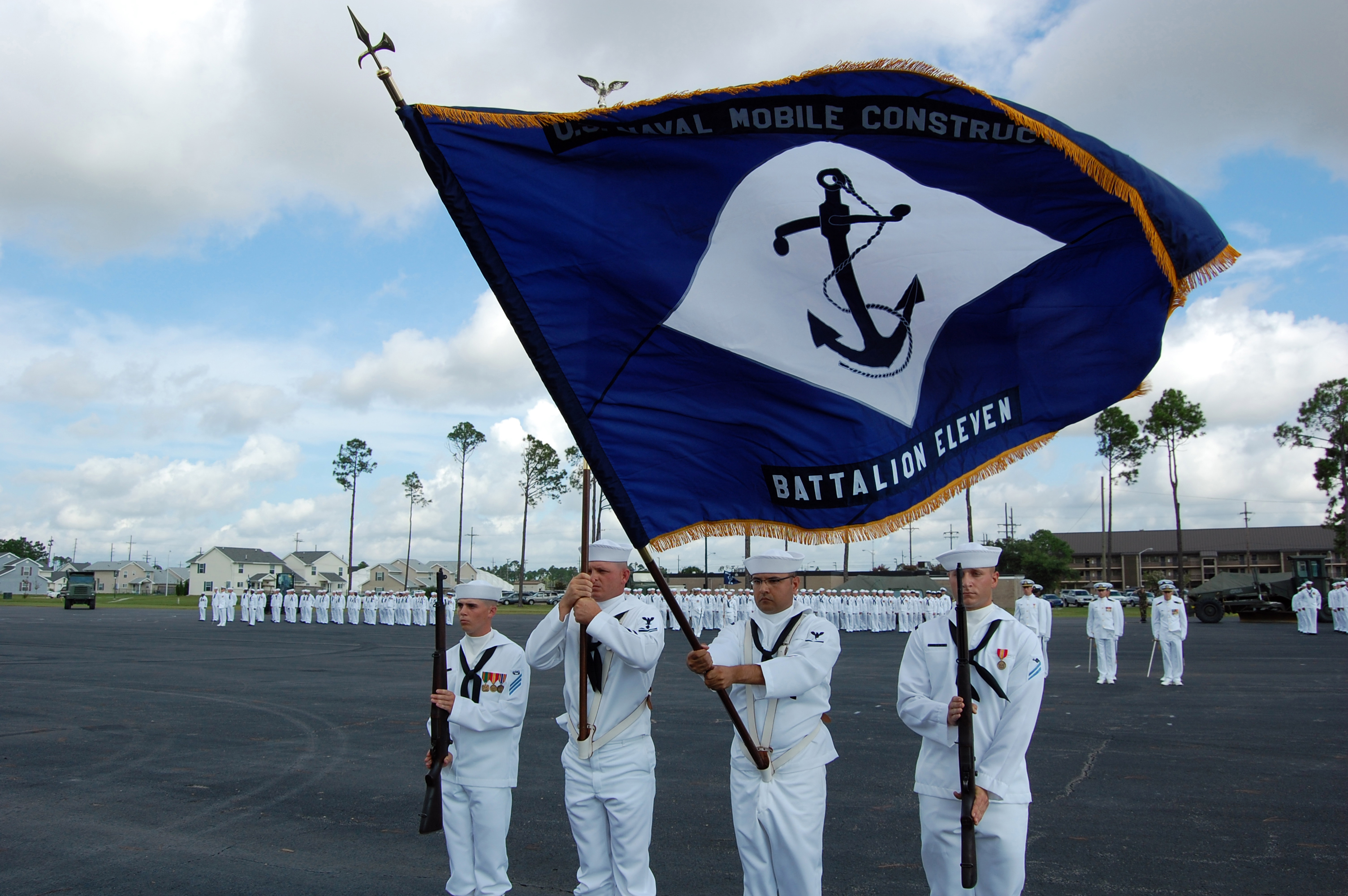
NMCB 11 commissioning (USN)

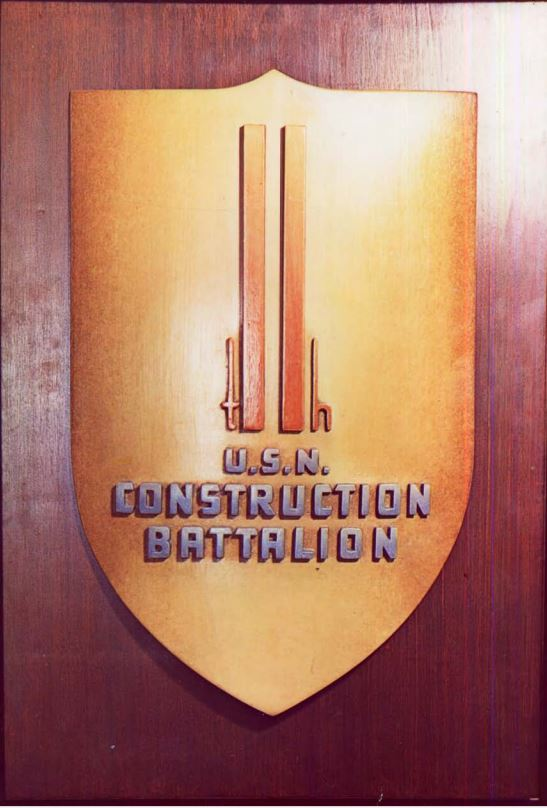
WWII 11th CB insignia. It is a classic example of late Deco Streamline Moderne design. In 1944 the insignia was revised by the listing of all the deployment sites that was still style sensitive to the original design. Another revision followed adding naval icons around the border. (USN)

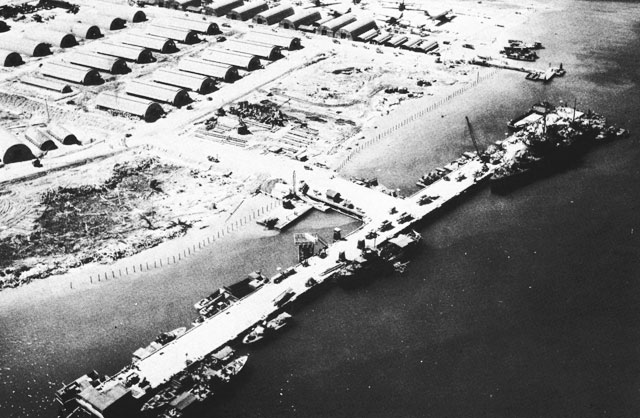
Lombrum Point ship repair dock, Los Negros built by 11 NCB (USN)

Naval Mobile Construction Battalion 11 (NMCB 11) is a United States Navy Construction Battalion, otherwise known as a Seabee Battalion, presently home-ported at the Naval Construction Battalion Center (Gulfport, Mississippi). The unit was formed during World War II as the 11th Naval Construction Battalion at Camp Allen on 28 June 1942. On 1 July, she moved to the new Seabee base Camp Bradford. Seabee battalions were numbered sequentially in the order they were stood up. The battalion lost one man during the war to a construction accident. The 11th CB was inactivated on 1 December 1945, at Subic Bay, Philippines.

The unit was reactivated as Mobile Construction Battalion 11 in the fall 1953, only to be decommissioned again in December 1969. However, MCB 11 made four tours in Vietnam. Eleven's fourth Seabee Technical Assistance Team (STAT) was sent to a Special Forces camp near the junction of two jungle routes, one called the Ho Chi Minh trail. It was the main route for the Viet Cong into South Vietnam, and led to the most decorated group of Seabees in Seabee history. The battalion's 1967 tour exposed the men to the most severe combat the Seabees had seen since World War II. They came under fire 128 times, costing them 12 KIA. There were construction fatalities as well. In addition, the battalion suffered 102 wounded. NMCB 11 had one man make all four tours, getting a ribbon that matches the battalion's battle streamer. The battalion was deactivated in 1969.

Reactivated in 2007, NMCB 11 has since deployed to both Iraq and Afghanistan. It has also undertaken international engagement activities in the Pacific, and supported the relief efforts of Hurricane Sandy. Homeport for NMCB 11 is NCBC Gulfport Mississippi

== History ==
=== WWII ===
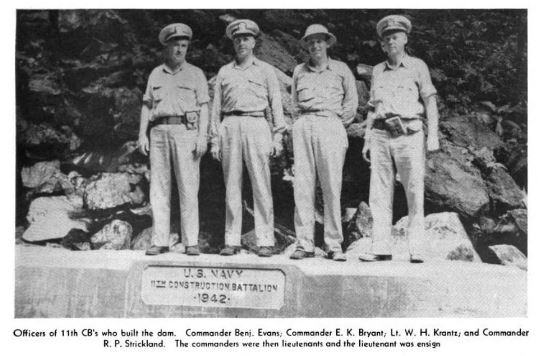
11's Dam

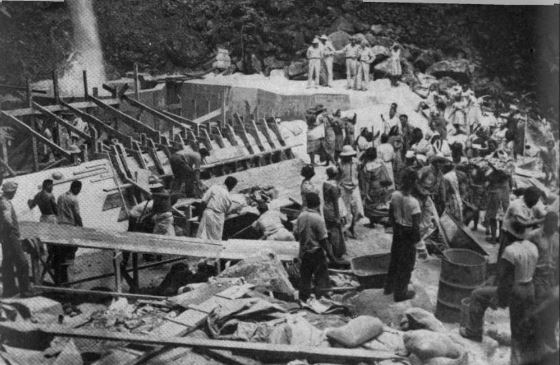
CAP CB 11

From Camp Bradford, the battalion caught a train to the Advance Base Depot, Port Hueneme. NCB 11 was the very first CB to embark from that port for the Pacific. In the early record, 11th's first assignments are referenced by their code-names: Straw-hat, Straw-stack and Fetlock. "Straw-hat" was Upolo, Samoa, "Straw-stack" was Tutuila, Samoa, and "Fetlock" was Pago Pago. Eleven's primary projects were the construction of a Cub destroyer base and harbor facilities at Tutuila, fuel tanks, pump system, and fuel dock. A detachment was also sent to assist the 2nd CB on Upolo. From Samoa, CB 11 was transferred to Nouméa, New Caledonia when CBMU 506 relieved them on Samoa. Nouméa was Hq for SOPAC. The main project on there was Naval Mobile Hospital 5. There were 3 detachment sites: Magenta, Ducos, and Ile Nou. They were then sent to New Zealand for R&R. The next stop was Banika Island in the Russells to build a dock for Acorn.

From there, the battalion embarked the USS Wharton (AP-7) for the Admiralty Islands campaign. On Los Negros Island 11 built the operational home for the 2nd NCR and started a Lion for the 7th Fleet. Shipmates with them on AP-7 was the 58th CB. At Milne Bay, Los Negros the 11th and 58th CBs joined the 71st. Projects the 11th had were the construction of three repair bases on Seeadler Harbor for seaplanes, landing craft, and the fleet. The seaplane base became home for VPB-52 and their PBYs. From Los Negros the 11th returned to CONUS. After an extended R&R the battalion shipped out along with the 35th and 80th (colored) CBs for Subic Bay, Philippines. At Subic Bay, the 11th took over projects started by the 115th CB as well as team-worked with them on others. These included the completion of an Amphibious Training Center, Advance Base Construction Depot, a 400' marine railway. and a 1,200-foot pier to serve a supply depot. On 1 December 1945 the battalion was inactivated. The record does not give the date that the men reached CONUS.

- One of the Seabees first Civic action projects, possibly the first, happened on Island X early in the war. A project was formulated that CB 11 would build a dam and reservoir to supply an airfield, naval base, hospital as well as a neighboring village. The site chosen was inaccessible to transport, a mile from the village. To get close to the site, a trail had to be grubbed and corduroy road laid and a 20' bridge built. Even so, the last 500' materials had to be man-handled into position. For this the villagers were approached for the labor. The dam itself was constructed by them under Seabee supervision. Each laborer got his wife, mother, aunt, and daughter to carry the cement materials in head baskets to the cement mixer. In all 200 women were part to the work party.
- 11 NCBs original WWII Log and documents are at the NHHC-Seabee Museum website (click on "Naval Construction Battalion").
- AP-7, formerly SS Southern Cross, was one of the ships for Antarctic exploration by Admiral Byrd. When the battalion published its cruise book in 1944 "Southern Cross Duty" was chosen for the title. The inspiration for the name came from the USS Wharton's history and being the battalion's transport south of the equator.
- duty stations: Samoa 10 months, New Caledonia 5 months, New Zealand 1 month, Banika 2.5 months, Los Negros 6 months, on ship 2.5 months, Port Hueneme 6 months, Philippines 5 months

=== Cold War era ===
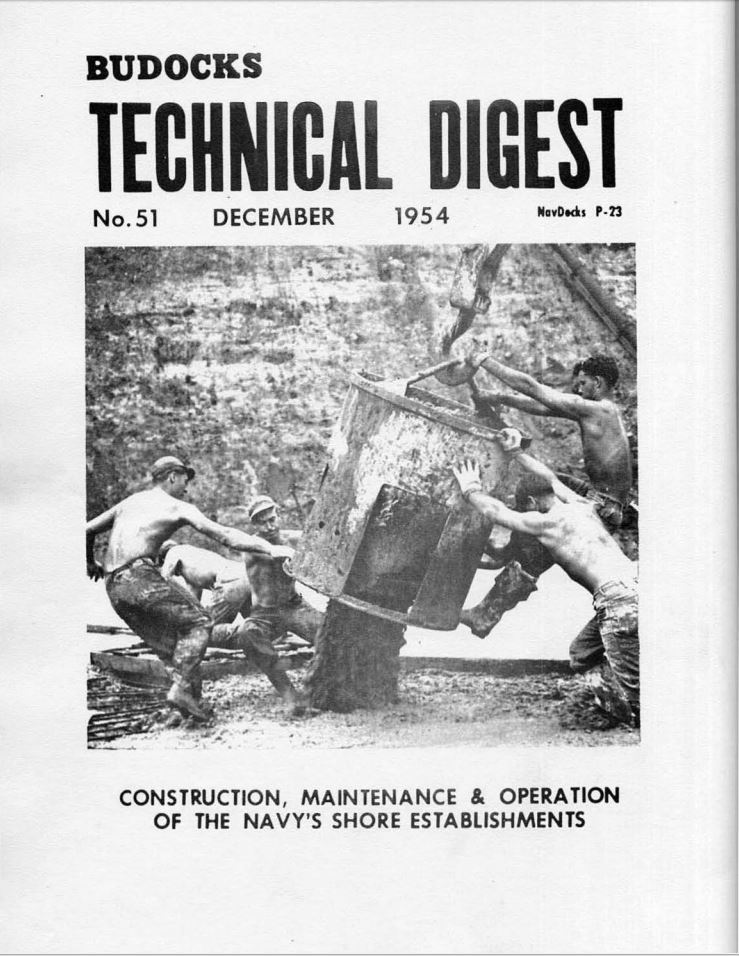
Cover of BUDOCKS Technical Digest No51 with MCB 11 crew pouring the top of a low level reservoir at Cubi Point, Bataan, Philippines. The photo is an iconic Seabee image. (USN)

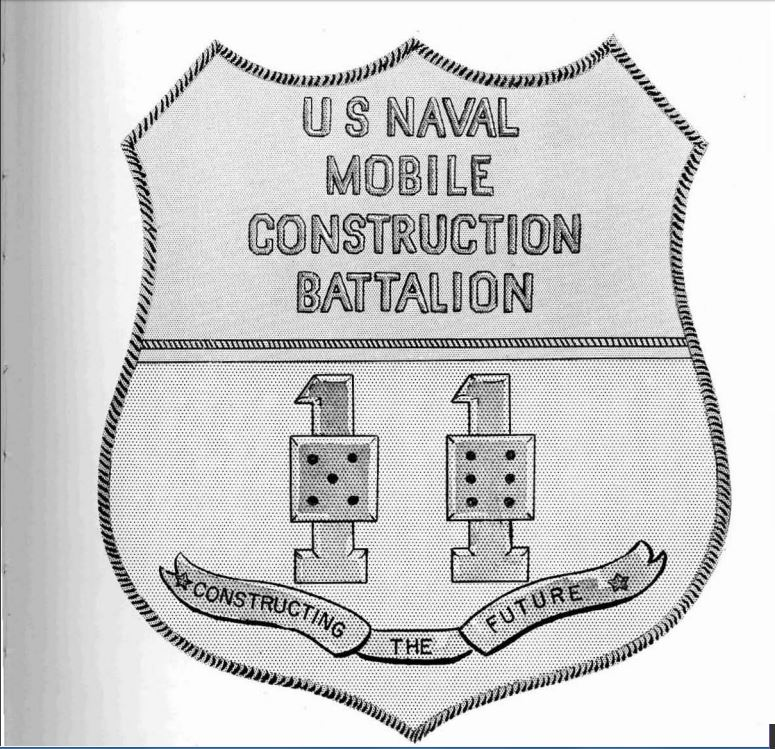
MCB 11 insignia 1953–55. It appears on the cover of the 1953–54 cruise-book, minus the words, just the number 11 and two dice. (Seabee Museum)

In August 1953, the battalion was reactivated as Mobile Construction Battalion 11 (MCB 11) at Port Hueneme, CA. The battalion did not deploy to Korea. Instead, her first deployment returned the battalion to its last World War II duty station, Subic Bay. The project was constructing Naval Air Station Cubi Point with its adjacent pier. Along with CBs 2, 3, 5 and 9 MCB 11 was involved in the leveling of a mountain that civilian contractors said could not be done. It cost of $100,000,000 in 1956 ($1.18 billion in 2025 dollars). In November 1955 MCB 11 landed on Kwajalein to build Department of Defense housing totaling 78 buildings. On Halloween 1959, the battalion relieved MCB 9 on Okinawa. The job was building base infra-structure: five 100'x400' warehouses, four shops, plus supply and administration buildings. Sent to Midway Island in December 1961, the battalion worked on a seaplane ramp, the station's roads, as well as civilian and military housing. However, MCB 11 had three atypical projects for the Atomic Energy Commission on Kwajalein, Eniwetok, and Nevada. The battalion repaired massive damage caused by the 11 November 1962 arrival of Typhoon Karen on Guam; an advanced party left for the island just days after the storm on 15 November, followed by the main body on 5 December. In 1965 MCB 11 had two Seabee teams sent behind the Iron Curtain to deal with a bug problem the State Department had discovered in U.S. embassies.

=== Vietnam ===
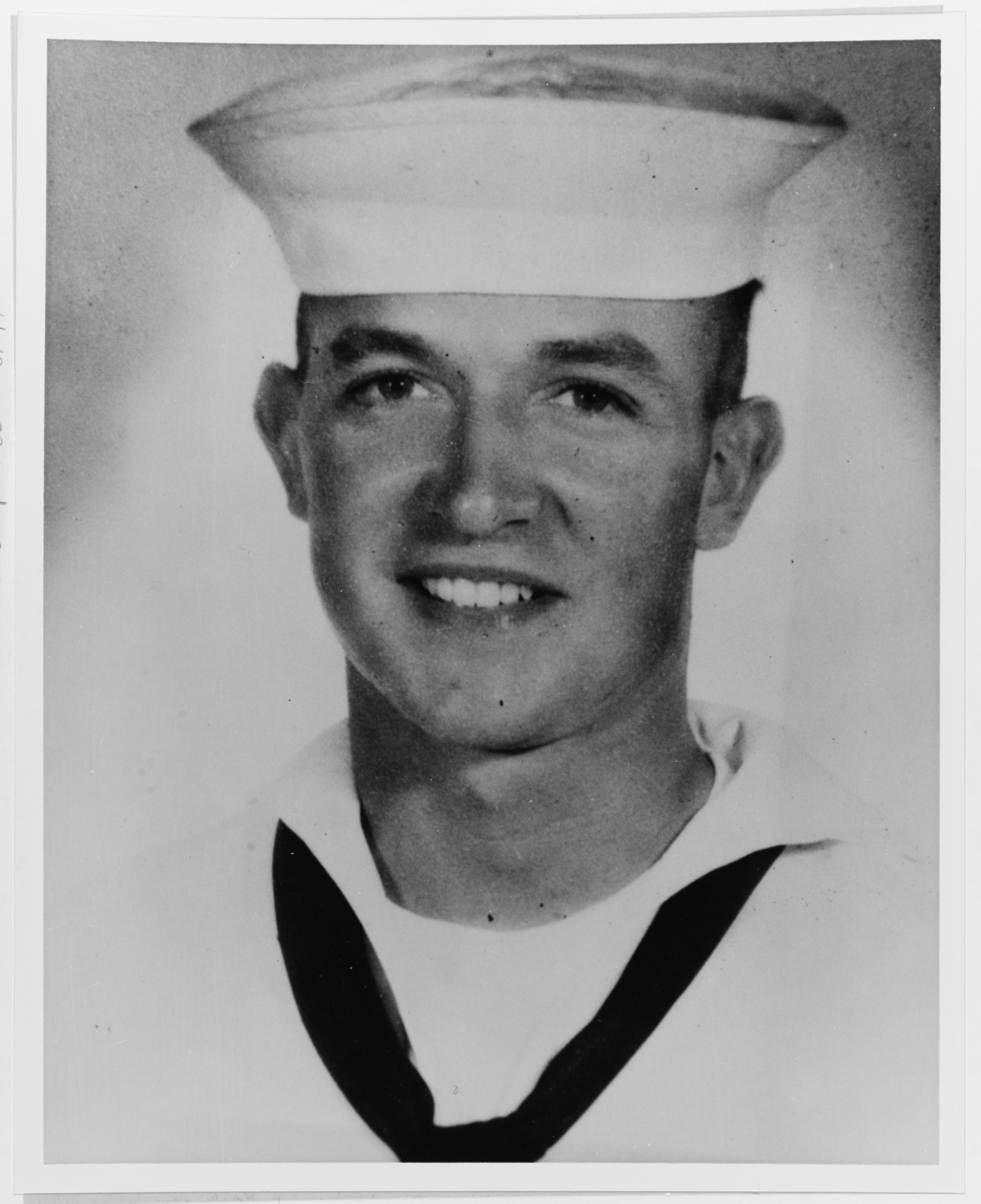
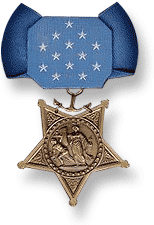
CM3 Marvin Glenn Shields Mobile Construction Battalion 11.

- 1965 in late January, the battalion made history when it deployed to Okinawa. MCB 11 was the first Mobile CB to deploy by air. In February, Seabee Technical Assistance Team 1104 was sent to Ben Soi, Vietnam where they built a camp for U.S. Special forces. "Seabee teams with Secret Clearances were sent to Vietnam to assist the U.S. Army's Special Forces in the CIA funded Civilian Irregular Defense Group program (CIDG)". In June the program gave STAT 1104 another Special Forces assignment, construct a new camp at Dong Xoai. Nine of the team-members departed Ben-Soi to join Captain Bill Stokes (5th Special Forces Group) commander of the 10 men of team, A-342 at Đồng Xoài. The camp had two adjoining compounds: The Green Berets, Seabees, and 200 odd Montagnards(CIDG) were in one, while 200 plus RVN Army were in the other. On the night 9 June the camp was attacked by over 2000 Viet Cong, beginning what is now called the Battle of Đồng Xoài. The combined Green Beret Seabee force lost 3 men, 16 were wounded and one was unscathed. Nearly all of the RVN Army and Montagnards were casualties. Steelworker 2nd class William C. Hoover became the first Seabee to lose his life in Vietnam. Though already wounded twice, CM3 Marvin Glenn Shields helped retrieve a badly wounded Stokes and then volunteered to carry ammo for 1st Lt Charles Q. Williams assault on a machine-gun position. They took that gun out but both were wounded again returning to their positions. For Shields it was fatal. Both men received the Medal of Honor for their actions. The next day, nearly out of ammunition and under heavy fire, the survivors were extracted at 1300 by three Hueys and a gunship from the 118th Aviation Company. Except, LTJG Peterlin and EOC McCully had gotten separated from the others and were left behind while Dong Xoia was declared a free-fire zone. Both men survived the night and were awarded Silver Stars. The other team members all received Bronze Stars with Vs for valor. Every man received a Purple Heart and the team received the Navy Unit Commendation. CM3 Shields is the only Seabee to ever be awarded the Medal of Honor. The Republic of Vietnam awarded Marvin Shields posthumously with the Republic of Vietnam Gallantry Cross with Palm and the Military Merit Medal. For their part, the Seabees named their bases at Chu Lai, Vietnam and on Okinawa "Camp Shields" in his honor and named their base in Da Nang for SW2 Hoover.
- 1965 USMC base Camp Hansen on Okinawa was completed after 29 months of construction by MCBs 3, 9, and 11 repurposing Chimu Airfield.
- 1966 1st Tour: Battalion deployed to Camp Adenir at Da Nang from February–October. John Wayne paid the battalion a visit in June to dedicate the enlisted-men's club.
- 1967 2nd Tour: This time the battalion went north to Dong Ha USMC Combat Base, just 13 miles south of the DMZ. There, they came under enemy fire 128 times that resulted in 5 KIA and 52 purple hearts. Eleven's first casualty was Senior Chief Barnes and the Seabee Camp at Dong Ha was named for him. The battalion saw the most severe enemy fire experienced by any CB since WWII while on this tour. The primary projects were the air field at Dong Ha Combat Base, CB Camp, and twenty eight 50-foot observation towers. The battalion had too many other projects to enumerate here. During this deployment, an urgent airfield was needed at Quảng Trị. The project was designated "top secret", site "X", and to be completed in under 45 days. MCBs 1, 3, 4, 7, 11, 74, 121, and 133 all sent detachments of men and equipment to get the job done. Those detachments dubbed themselves the "Ghost Battalion" and chose the Jolly Roger for the battalion's colors. The Ghost Battalion was relieved by NMCB 10 disbanded 1 November 1967.
- 1968 3rd Tour: Quang Tri air base. The battalion made history in just getting to Vietnam. They were the first CB to deploy by air to the theater. The first couple of months saw the battalion living in tents pitched on sandy soil that did little for morale. There were a number of "High Priority" projects, starting with an Ammunition Supply Point. A "Minimum Essential Requirements" project (MER) for camp upgrades in the Quang Tri Combat area for the Army, Navy, and Marine Corps was also on that list. The project lead was NMCB 11, augmented by 200 man detachments from CBs 1, 3, 4, 7, 10, 11, 74, 121, and 133. The MER project was to build over 2000 basic structures to get "ALL" U.S. troops out of the sand and under cover before the next monsoon began. Another "High Priority" was roadwork on Rt 1, the length of Vietnam. In addition to NMCB 11, CBs 1, 4, 7, 8, 53, 58, 62, 71, 74, 133, and 138 all worked concurrently on the route. On September 18 the new Seabee base that NMCB 11 built, Camp Rhodes, was commissioned at Quang Tri. It was named in honor of Lt. Joseph Rhodes CEC, who was killed in action.
- 1969 4th Tour: On this deployment, the battalion had three main deployment sites: Vietnam, Okinawa and Guam. In Vietnam the main projects were roads and bridges. One was the destroyed railway bridge built by the French at Song Bo. There, the crew came under enemy fire that attempted to stop the repairs several times, earning the men the Navy Combat Action Ribbon. Another bridge was on Route 1 at Bau Phu. NMCBs 1 and 11 did the construction work while 128 and 133 provided material support. On Okinawa, the battalion was on the island when Typhoon Cora passed with its 175 knot winds. NMCB 11 assisted in the recovery there. The battalion returned to homeport to be decommissioned in December.
- See the MCB 11 Association website for a detailed account of this period and complete listing of all construction done.

In 1968 the Marine Corps requested that the Navy change its use of "MCB" for Mobile Construction Battalion as the Marine Corps were using "MCB" for "Marine Combat Base". The dual usage was creating confusion in Vietnam. The Navy agreed there was an issue and changed the Navy's CB name format. The USN from "United States Naval" Mobile Construction Battalions was changed to U.S. and the N was moved to the "MCB" creating the "NMCBs" that exist today.

Seabee Technical Assistance Teams

- 1103 Nam Pot, Thailand, 1964
- 1104 Ben Soi Special Forces Det. A-321 (Feb-June) 1964
- 1104 Đồng Xoài Special Forces Det. A-342 (June) 1964

Seabee Teams

- 1105 Pleiku Special Forces Det. A-334A ( July-Dec) 1965, When team 1105 left Pleiku on December 23 the" Seabee Team Program in support of the U.S. Army Special Forces and Civilian Irregular Defense Group (CIDG) Program" came to an end.
- MMT Thailand (During 1965 the Seabees had 5 "Mobile Training Teams" for well drilling. MCB 11's team was made up of Equipment operators and Construction mechanics.)
- MMT #2 Pleiku 1965
- Seabee Team "Project Demo" U.S.State Department: de-bugging U.S. Eastern European Embassies and repairing the removal damage. 1965
- 1108 Bình Dương, Awarded Navy Meritorious Unit Commendation 1967
- 1109 Chiang Kam, Thailand 1967
- 1110 Cần Thơ and Long Xuyên (in the Mekong Delta) 1967
- 1111 Bueng Kan(บึงกาฬ) and then Thung Song(ทุ่งสง) pronounced [tʰûŋ sǒŋ] Thailand 1968
- 1112 Chiam Kham and then Mae Chan(แม่จัน), Thailand 1968
- 1113 Yap Island (when NMCB 11 was decommissioned this team was still deployed and was transferred to NMCB 3 and re-designated Seabee team 0315) 1969
- 1114 Majuro Island (when NMCB 11 was decommissioned this team was still deployed and was transferred to NMCB 3 and re-designated Seabee team 0316) 1969
- Commander Naval Construction Battalion U.S. Pacific Fleet, Tân Sơn Nhất, Republic of Vietnam, Completion Report 1963–1972. Seabee Teams
MCB 11 in Vietnam
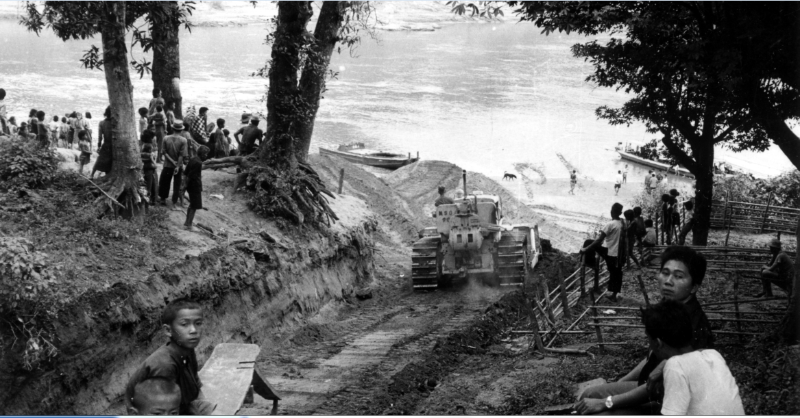
Seabee Technical Assistance Team 1103 at Nam Pat, Thailand, 1964

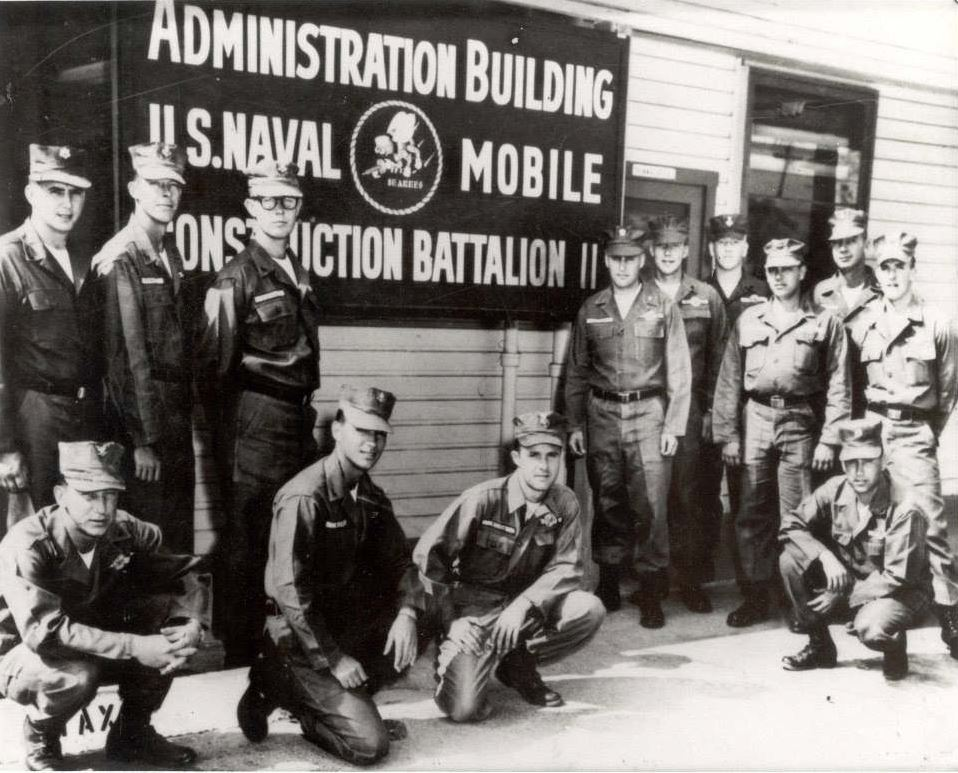
STAT 1104 in Port Hueneme L-R standing: J. Klepher, D. Brakken, W. Hoover, Ltjg Peterlin, Cmdr L.W.Eyman, D. Mattick, J. Keenan, J.R. McCully, M. Shields, kneeling: R. Supczak, F.J. Alexander Jr, J. Wilson, J. Allen.

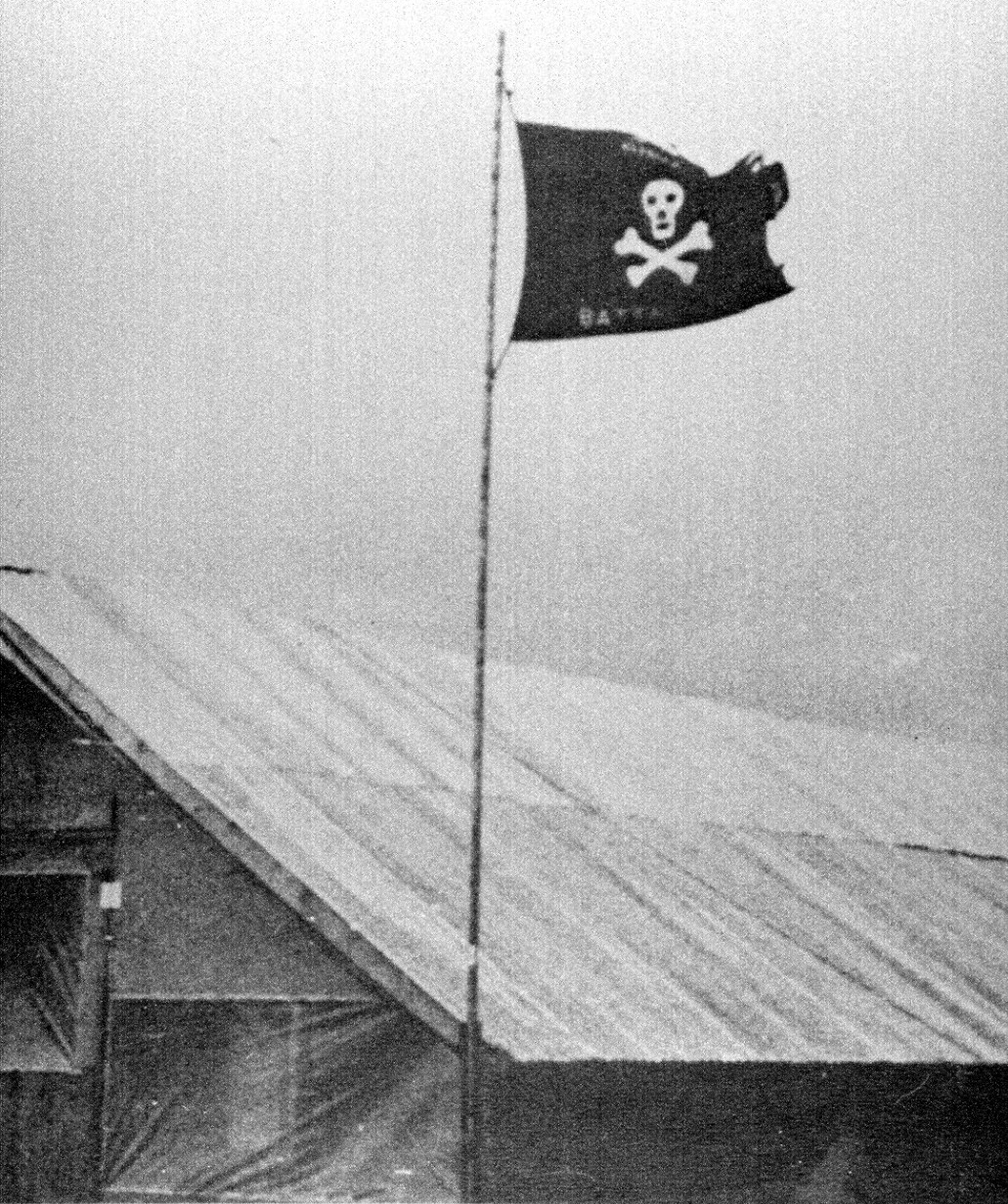
Ghost Battalion colors at Quảng Trị. The Seabees had 11,000 graves to move in order to construct that airfield.

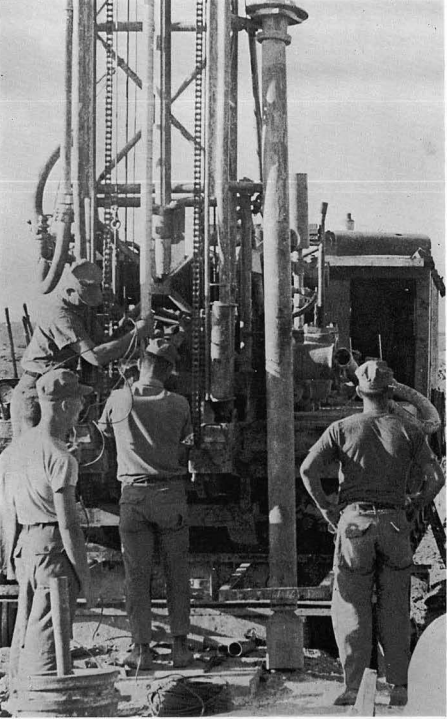
MCB 11 well drilling team sinking a hole for CBMU 301's camp at Dong Ha combat base 1967.

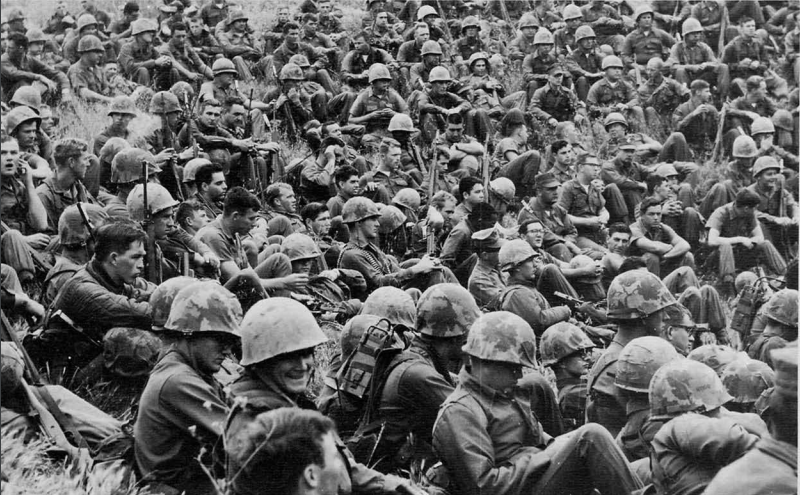
MCB 11 receiving USMC field instruction at Camp Pendelton during the battalions 5 weeks of military training in 1968.

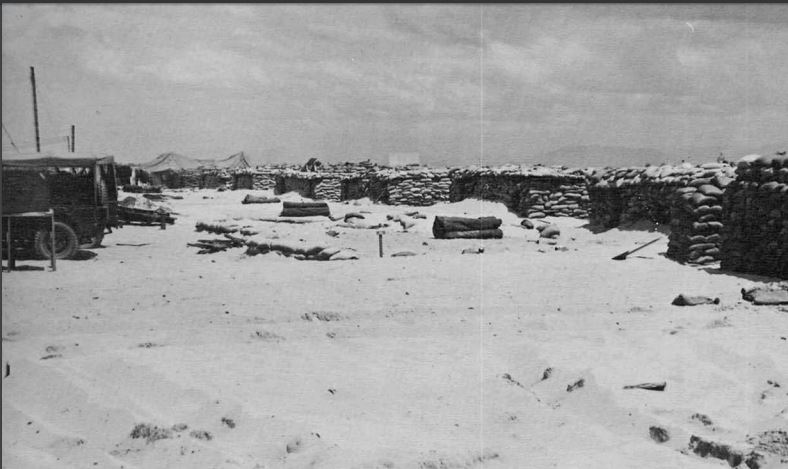
MCB 11's first camp at Quang Tri being disassembled.

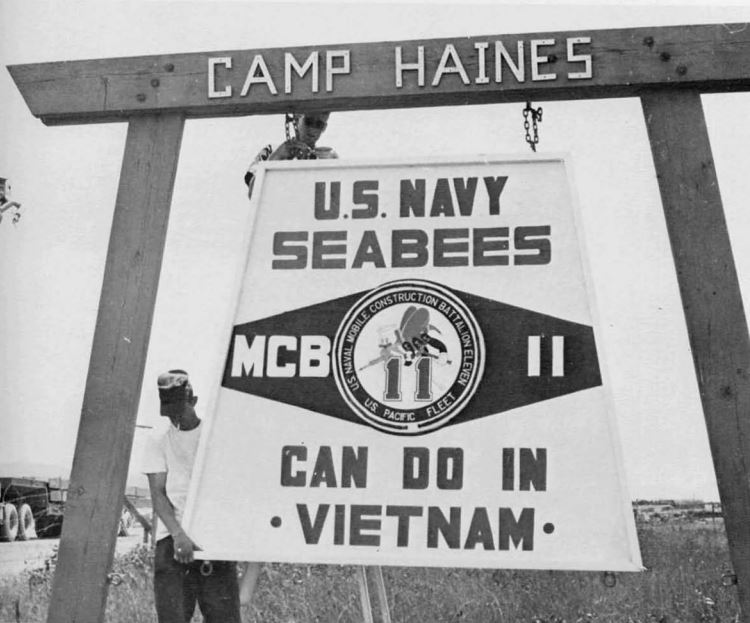
MCB 11 Vietnam camp sign 1969 (note sign; battalion had not completely adopted the name change to NMCB)

=== 2007 to present ===
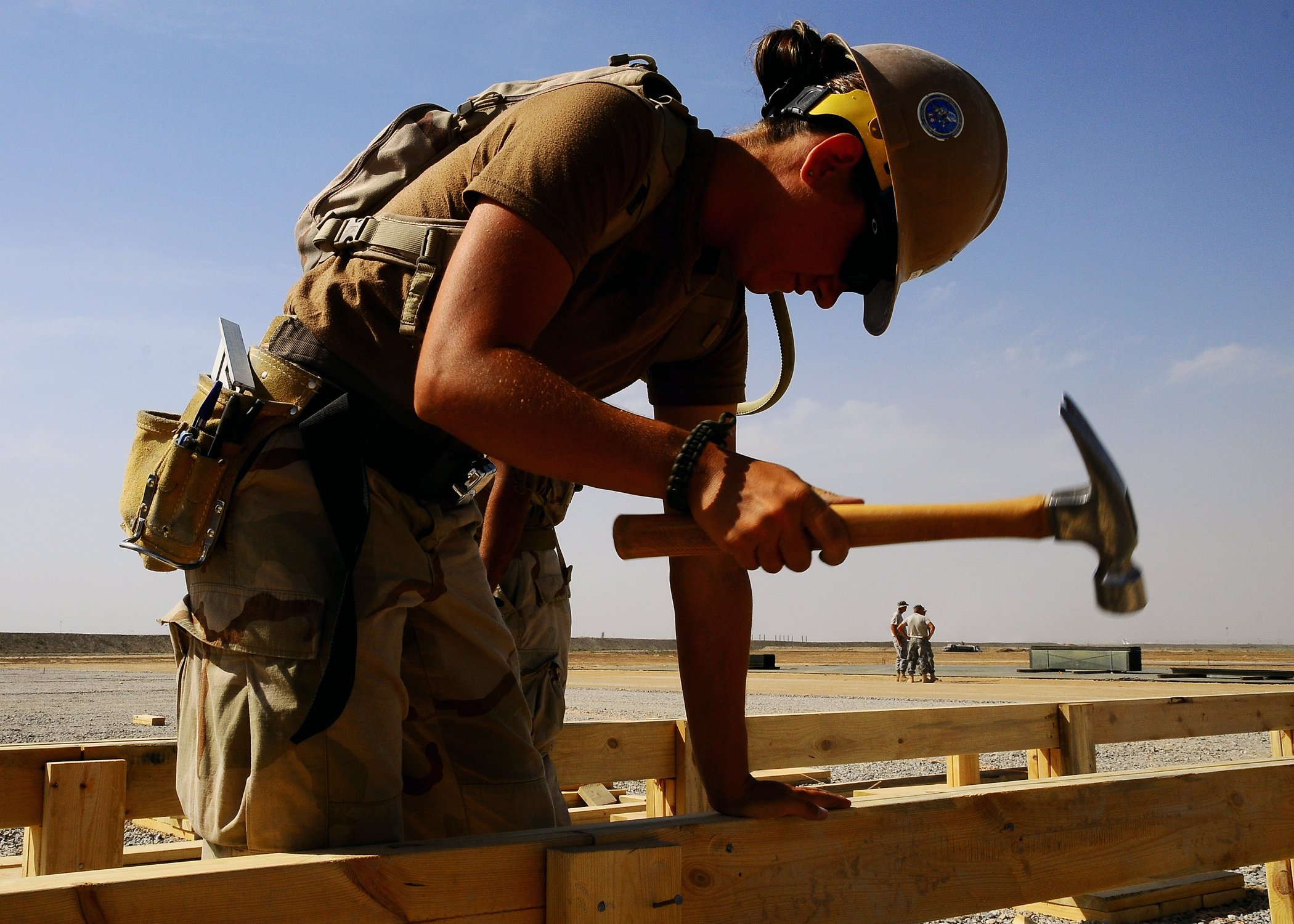
Builder 3rd Class Amy Higgins with NMCB 11's Air Det in Afghanistan, builds a Southwest Asia hut.

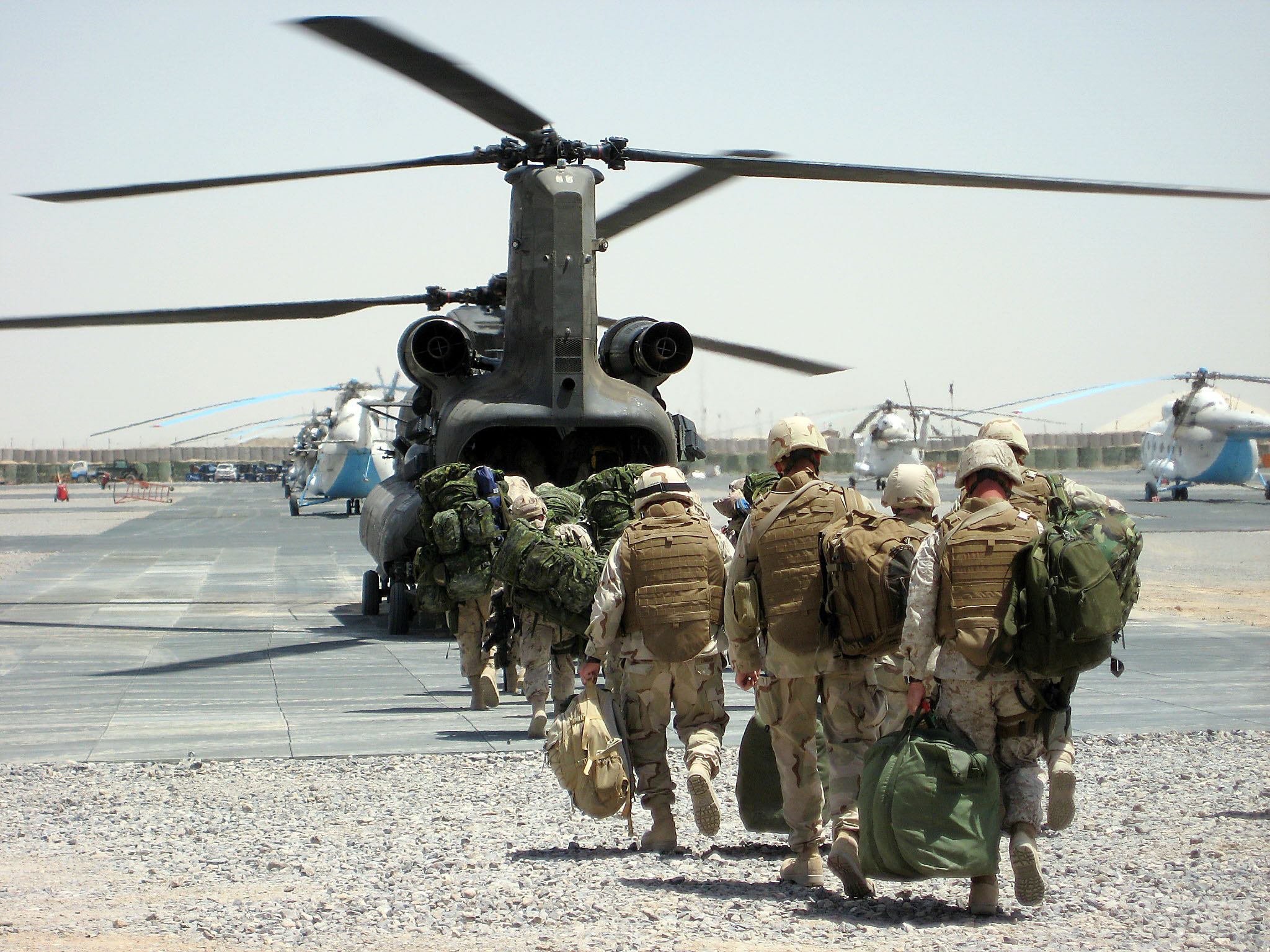
NMCB 11 boards a CH-47 Chinook for transport to Special Forces projects in Afghanistan 2009.

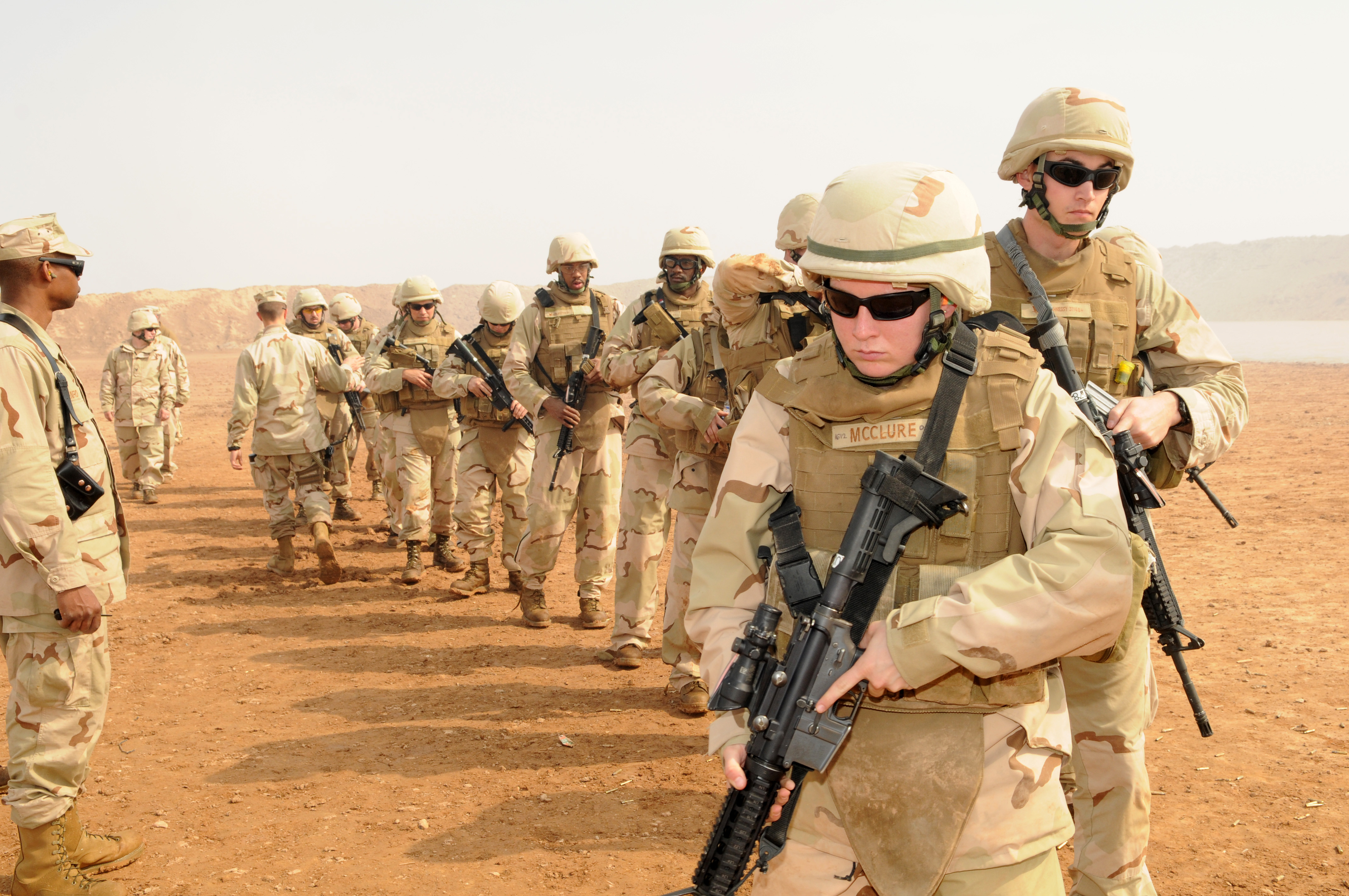
NMCB-11 at the firing range at Camp Leatherneck.

NMCB 11 was recommissioned on 14 September 2007 in order for the Naval Construction Forces (NCF) to carry out the increasing construction projects it was being tasked with throughout the world. Eleven was classified as the first "SMART Battalion", and instituted many of the initiatives and changes being implemented to improve NCF operations. According to the battalions webpage, "NMCB ELEVEN is tasked with providing advance base construction, battle damage repair, contingency engineering, humanitarian assistance and disaster recovery support to our fleet and unified commanders."

- 2009: The battalion was deployed in support of Operation Enduring Freedom (OEF) and Operation Iraqi Freedom (OIF). The battalion's civic action component was tasked to Exercise SHARED ACCORD 2009.
- 2010: The battalion had a deployment of civic action projects. One of these took a year to plan and three months to execute. This was the drilling of 3 wells in Cambodia for the Pacific Partnership 2010 in partnership with the hospital ship USNS Mercy (T-AH-19).(FIG. 15) NMCB 11 also went to the aid of the U.S. Agency for International Development (USAID) offices in Timor-Leste. In June NMCB 11 broke ground a Community center in Timor-Leste as part of Exercise Crocodilo, a Marine Corps exercise conducted by the 15th Marine Expeditionary Unit (MEU).
- 2011: Requested by Kiritimati Island(Christmas Island) the U.S. sent a team from NMCB 11 to build the first health care facility on the island.
- 2012: The battalion deployed to FOB Camp Leatherneck in Helmand Province, Afghanistan. Work there was primarily in support of the Marine Corps and Special Operations Forces (USA). Much of this work took the form of building FOBs. There were also a fair number of civic action projects.
- 2012: After Hurricane Sandy, NMCB 11's Air-Det was sent to New Jersey and New York for two weeks.
- 2015: Deployment projects were carried out in support of OEF, as well as force protection, camp maintenance at various camps and civic action.
- 2018: Hurricane Michael support

== Insignia ==
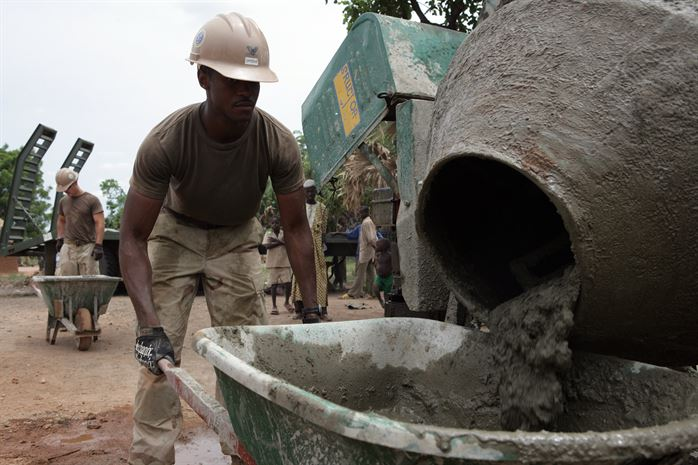
NMCB 11 at BEMBEREKE, Benin, June 14, 2009. UT3 Terrell L. Green receives a new batch of cement. While deployed to Rota, Spain NMCB-11 was tasked to Exercise SHARED ACCORD 2009. The exercise was a bilateral field training exercise conducting small unit infantry and staff training with the Beninese military. Humanitarian and civil assistance projects ran concurrent with the exercise.(USMC)

Like most CBs, 11 does not use the unit insignia from WWII. When the battalion was reactivated the first time, a pair of dice showing eleven was adopted for the unit insignia That design had no Seabee on it. The cover of the 1955–56 Cruise-book has an insignia on it exactly like the one used today, minus the phrase "Remembering the Past". For an unknown reason, the dice were removed from the unit insignia on the cover of the 1969 cruise-book.

== Unit awards ==
NMCB 11 has received several unit citations and commendations. Members who participated in actions that merited the award are authorized to wear the medal or ribbon associated with the award on their uniform. Awards and decorations of the United States Armed Forces have different categories, i.e. Unit, Campaign, Service, and Personal. Unit Citations are distinct from the other decorations. The following unit awards are 11's:

- Navy Unit Commendation: with two bronze stars: 1966, 1967, 1968 (covers two award periods) Vietnam
- Republic of Vietnam Civil Actions Medal Unit Citation
- Republic of Vietnam Gallantry Cross with Palm Unit Award (5)
- Navy Meritorious Unit Commendation: 1969 Vietnam (single award covers two award periods)
- Navy Meritorious Unit Commendation : 2010 USNS Mercy Cambodia
- Navy "E" Ribbon : – U.S. Atlantic Fleet Battle "E" (6) times.
- Peltier Award: – 3

Campaign and Service Awards |Vietnam Service NMCB 11's Battle Streamer for Vietnam has one silver star and two bronze stars: the streamer alone counts as the first award. MCB 11 made 4 tours of Vietnam. The conflict was divided into 18 award periods and the battalion qualifies for eight.

- Asiatic-Pacific Campaign Medal
- World War II Victory Medal
- Philippine Liberation Ribbon
- Vietnam Campaign Medal service ribbon with 60– Device : – 3 awards
- Vietnam Service Medal: – 8 awards( see the battle streamer above)
- Navy Combat Action Ribbon (awarded individually)
- National Defense Medal : 11.1950–27.07.1954 (Korea)
- National Defense Medal : 11.1961–14.08.1974 (Vietnam)
- National Defense Service Medal : War on Terror
- Global War on Terrorism Service Medal
- Global War on Terrorism Expeditionary Medal
- Afghanistan Campaign Medal

11's Seabee Teams

- 1101 – Navy Unit Commendation
- 1104 – Navy Unit Commendation
- 1108 – Navy Meritorious Unit Commendation
- 1113 – Navy Meritorious Unit Commendation
- 1114 – Navy Unit Commendation
  - A complete listing of NMCB 11s Vietnam: Unit, Individual, and letters of commendation: see appendices 2–6
  - Complete Seabee Teams Report by: Commander Naval Construction Battalion U.S. Pacific Fleet, Tân Sơn Nhất, Republic of Vietnam, Completion Report 1963–1972.

Unit Letters of Commendation

- Brigadier General Henry L. Larsen USMC, Commander Defense Forces American Samoa, 25 June 1943
- Rear Admiral Ben Moreell, Budocks, 7 August 1943
- Major General Charles F. B. Price USMC, Hq Defense Group (Samoa)
- Fleet Admiral William F. "Bull" Halsey (see: William Halsey), COMSOUTHPAC Forces Nouméa, New Caledonia, November 1, 1943
- Commodore J.E. Boak Commander Naval Base 3205 (Manus, Admiralty Islands), 11 May 1944
- Officer-in-Charge 4th USN Construction Brigade (Milne Bay) W. B. Short/G. G. Lancaster, 1 October 1944
- Officer-in-Charge Second U.S. Naval Construction Regiment (Milne Bay) Paul L. A. Keiser, 4 October 1944
- Rear Admiral Joseph F. Jelley, Commander, 10th Naval Construction Brigade, October 10, 1956 (for Kwajalein)
- ROICC Okinawa Award – 1964 "Contractor of the Month". June 1964, First time that this award was given to a Seabee battalion prior was only presented to civilian construction contractors.
- COMCBPAC Letter of Commendation, June 1965
- OIC CBPAC Detachment Thailand – 1967, Seabee Team 1109
- Dept. of the Army, HQ XXIV Corps, November 5, 1969 (Vietnam)

== List of commanding officers ==
Commanding officer	Period	Deployed to:	Detachments
LCDR Ernest A. Heckler	Jun 1942 – Oct 1943	Tutiula, Samoa	Upolo, Samoa, Pago pago
LCDR Benjamin Evans	Oct 1943 – Feb 1944	Banika, Russell Island	
LCDR Lionel C. Tschudy	Feb 1944 – Oct 1944	Banika, Russell Island	
LCDR Edward K Bryant	Oct 1944 – Nov 1945	Camp Parks, CA, Subic Bay, Philippines	
LT Robert F. Wambsgans	Nov 1945 – Dec 1944	Camp Parks, CA, Subic Bay, Philippines	inactivated
LT Fritz H. Hediger	Jul 1953 – Aug 1953	NA	
LCDR Allison D. Froman	Aug 1953 – Sept 1953	NA	
LCDR James C. Castanes	Sept 1953 – Sept 1955	Subic Bay, Philippines	
CDR John A. Dougherty	Sept 1955 – Aug 1957	NAS Kwajalein	
CDR William R. Reese	Aug 1957 – Nov 1957	NAS Kwajalein	
CDR Harold F. Liberty	Nov 1957 – Feb 1960	NS Subic Bay	Philippines
CDR John P. Williams	Feb 1960 – Mar 1962	NS Subic Bay	Philippines "
CDR Paul J. Doyle, Jr	Mar 1962 – Apr 1963	NS Subic Bay	Philippines "
CDR William W. Barron	Apr 1963 – May 1966	NS Subic Bay	(November STAT 1103 Nam Pat, Thailand) (Feb 1965 STAT 1104 Ben Soi and Dong Xoai, Vietnam), (1 Aug 1965 STAT 1105 Tan Son Nhut Air Base, Vietnam)
CDR William L. Wilson	May 1966 – Jul 1967	'Đà Nẵng, Vietnam	Mar. CB Team 1106-Vĩnh Long, Aug CB Team 1107 Vĩnh Long
CDR William K Hartell	Jul 1967 – Jul 1969	'Đà Nẵng, Vietnam	Seabee team 1110 Cần Thơ and Long Xuyên RVN
CDR Jack L Godsey	Jul 1969 – Dec 1969	Vietnam, Okinawa, Guam	Seabee team 1110 Cần Thơ and Long Xuyên RVN
CDR Stephen Revelas	Sept 2007 – Jun 2009	Gulfport, OEF-OIF, Kuwait	re-commissioned
CDR Michael Monreal	Jun 2009 – May 2001	Gulfport, OEF-OIF, Kuwait	
CDR Lore Aguayo	May 2011 – Jun 2013	Afghanistan	FOB Leatherneck
CDR Steven J. Stasick	Jun 2013 – Nov 2014	Rota	Djibouti, Ghana, Niger, Burkina Faso, Bahrain, Guam
CDR Jorge R. Cuadros	Nov 2014 – Jun 2016	Rota	Djibouti, Cameroon, Somalia, Ethiopia, Kenya, Uganda, Niger, Chad, Tunisia, Bahrain, Guam, CCAD-Kwajalein, CCAD-Kosrae
CDR James E. Brown	Jun 2016 – May 2018	Rota	Poland, Ukraine, Israel, Germany, Bahrain, Kuwait, Afghanistan, Djibouti. Cameroon, Gabon, Guam, Kwajalein, Pohnpei, and Chuuk
CDR Dean E. Allen	May 2018–Present	Rota	Poland, Ukraine, Israel, Germany, Bahrain, Kuwait, Afghanistan, Djibouti. Cameroon, Gabon, Guam, Kwajalein, Pohnpei, and Chuuk

== See also ==
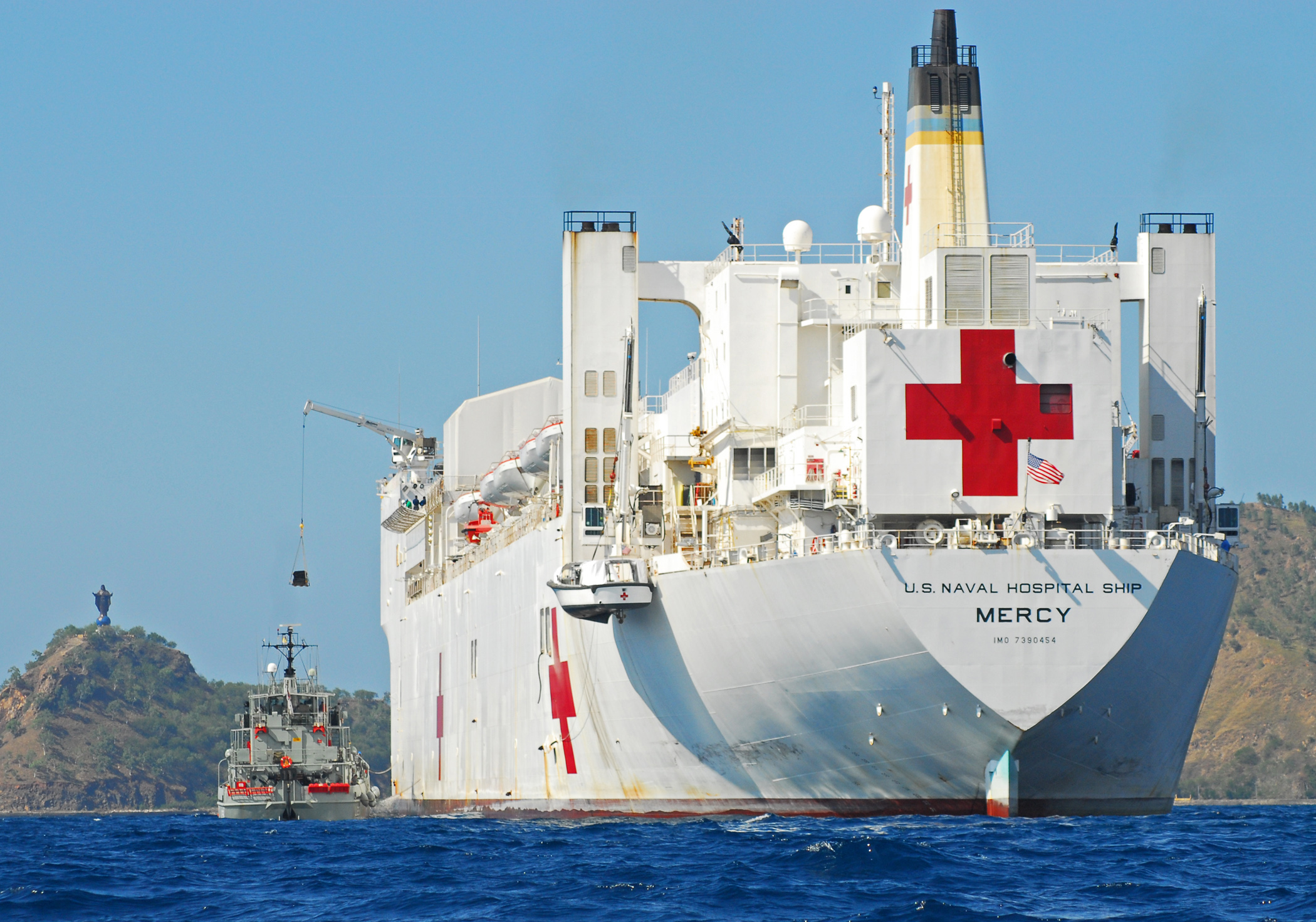
NMCB 11 drilled 3 wells in Cambodia for the Pacific Partnership 2010 in conjunction with the Military Sealift Command hospital ship USNS Mercy (T-AH 19)

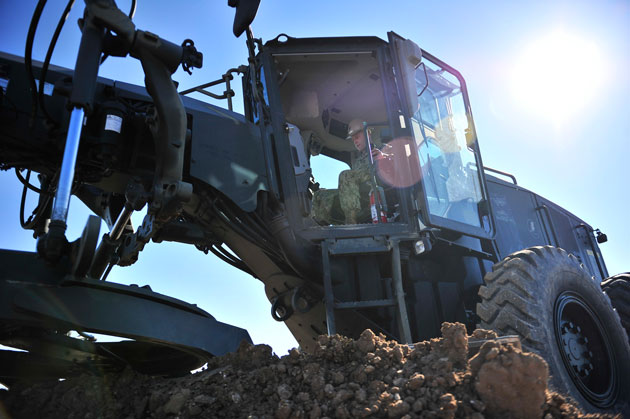
NMCB 11 at Rota 2015 (USN)

- Admiral Ben Moreell
- Admiralty Islands campaign
- Amphibious Construction Battalion 1 (ACB-1)
- Amphibious Construction Battalion 2 (ACB-2)
- Battle of Đồng Xoài
- Battle of Lang Vei
- Civil Engineer Corps United States Navy
- Naval Construction Battalion
- Naval Mobile Construction Battalion 1
- Naval Mobile Construction Battalion 3
- Naval Mobile Construction Battalion 4
- Naval Mobile Construction Battalion 5
- Naval Mobile Construction Battalion 133
- Naval Construction Battalion Center (Gulfport, Mississippi)
- Naval Construction Battalion Center Port Hueneme
- Naval Amphibious Base Little Creek
- Naval Amphibious Base Coronado
- USS Marvin Shields now Allende-class frigate
- Seabee
- Seabees in World War II
- Underwater Construction Teams
