= Marvin Glenn Shields =

US Medal of Honor recipient (1939–1965)

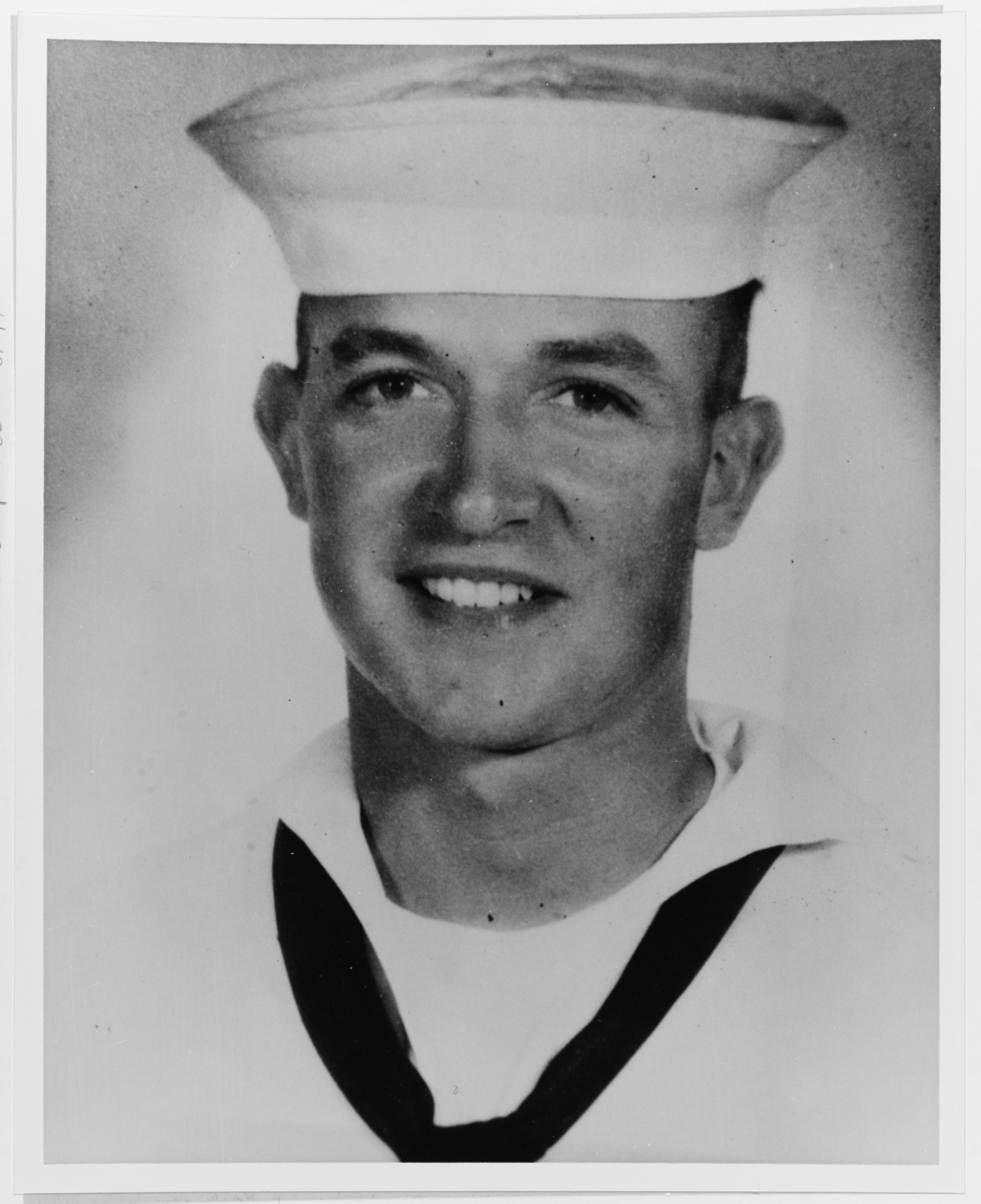
- Marvin Glenn Shields, Medal of Honor recipient
- Born: December 30, 1939; Port Townsend, Washington, US
- Died: June 10, 1965 (aged 25); Dong Xoai, Binh Phuoc Province, Republic of Vietnam
- Burial place: Gardiner Cemetery, Gardiner, Washington
- Military career
- Allegiance: United States of America
- Branch: United States Navy
- Service years: 1962–1965
- Rank: Construction Mechanic Third Class
- Unit: Seabee Team 1104, Naval Mobile Construction Battalion 11
- Conflicts: Vietnam War: Battle of Dong Xoai †
- Awards: Medal of Honor; Purple Heart Medal (3)

Marvin Glenn Shields (December 30, 1939 – June 10, 1965) was the first and only United States Navy Seabee to be awarded the Medal of Honor. He was also the first sailor to receive the Medal of Honor for “heroism above and beyond the call of duty” in the Vietnam War.

== Biography ==
Marvin G. Shields was born December 30, 1939, in Port Townsend, Washington. He lived near Port Townsend on Discovery Bay in Gardiner, Washington. He graduated from Port Townsend High School in 1958 and had moved to Hyder, Alaska, where he worked at Mineral Basin Mining Company, a gold mining project started by Port Townsend company.

=== U.S. Navy ===
==== Seabees ====
He joined the Navy on January 8, 1962, to be a Navy Seabee. He was assigned to the Naval Air Station at Glynco, Georgia for apprenticeship training in May which he completed in May 1963. In September, he was assigned to take Construction Mechanic training at the Naval Construction Training Center at Port Hueneme, California which he completed that month. Afterwards, he was assigned to Alfa Company, Naval Mobile Construction Battalion 11 (NMCB-11). On November 18, he deployed to Okinawa and was assigned there until September 1964. On November 1, he was assigned to Seabee Team 1104, Naval Construction Battalion 11, and completed Seabee team training at Port Hueneme on January 22, 1965. The Seabee team consisted of nine Seabees including one officer.

Shields and Seabee Team 1104 deployed to Saigon, Republic of Vietnam arriving on February 1, 1965. On March 28, Seabee Team 1104 was assigned to construct a U.S. Army Special Forces Camp at Ben Soi, completing their construction work on June 3. Seabee Team 1104 was next assigned to a newly established Army Special Forces Camp at Dong Xoai about 55 miles northwest of Saigon arriving on June 4, to assist in repair and construction of the compound which included an adjacent compound with the district headquarters building. An 11-man Army Special Forces ("Green Berets") team (Detachment A-342, 5th Special Forces Group (Airborne)) was in charge of the northern compound of Green Berets, Seabees, and 200 Montagnards. The adjacent compound was occupied by over 200 South Vietnamese Army soldiers.

==== Battle of Dong Xoai ====
On the night of June 9, 1965, the unfinished Army Special Forces Camp at Dong Xoai was mortared and attacked by the 272nd Vietcong Regiment (estimated over 2,000 uniformed Vietcong), and the Special Forces compound was captured the next morning. After being wounded by mortar fire, Shields fought with Special Forces soldiers against the enemy carrying up needed ammunition to the firing line positions. Although wounded again by shrapnel and shot in the jaw on June 10, he helped a soldier and a Seabee carry the badly wounded Special Forces captain in charge of the camp to a safer position in the compound. After four more hours of fighting, and greatly weakened, Shields volunteered to help Special Forces Second Lieutenant Charles Q. Williams who now was the acting commander since the Special Forces commander was one of the first badly wounded in the battle, destroy a Vietcong machine gun outside the perimeter which was threatening to kill everyone now in the adjacent district headquarters building which was now under the Williams's command and its occupants holding off the Vietcong attackers from all sides. Williams armed with a 3.5 rocket launcher which was loaded by Shields, destroyed the machine gun, and on the way back to the building Williams was wounded for the 4th time and Shields for the third time, shot in both legs. Shields was air-evacuated afterwards from Dong Xoai with five other Seabees to Saigon on June 10 and died during the evacuation.

Two Seabees of Team 1104, Shields and SW2 William C. Hoover lost their lives and seven of his Seabee team were wounded in the first two days of the Battle of Dong Xoai. Three Army Special Forces soldiers were also killed, plus several members of other American military units and many members of South Vietnamese military units which partook in the battle were killed and wounded.

==== Burial ====
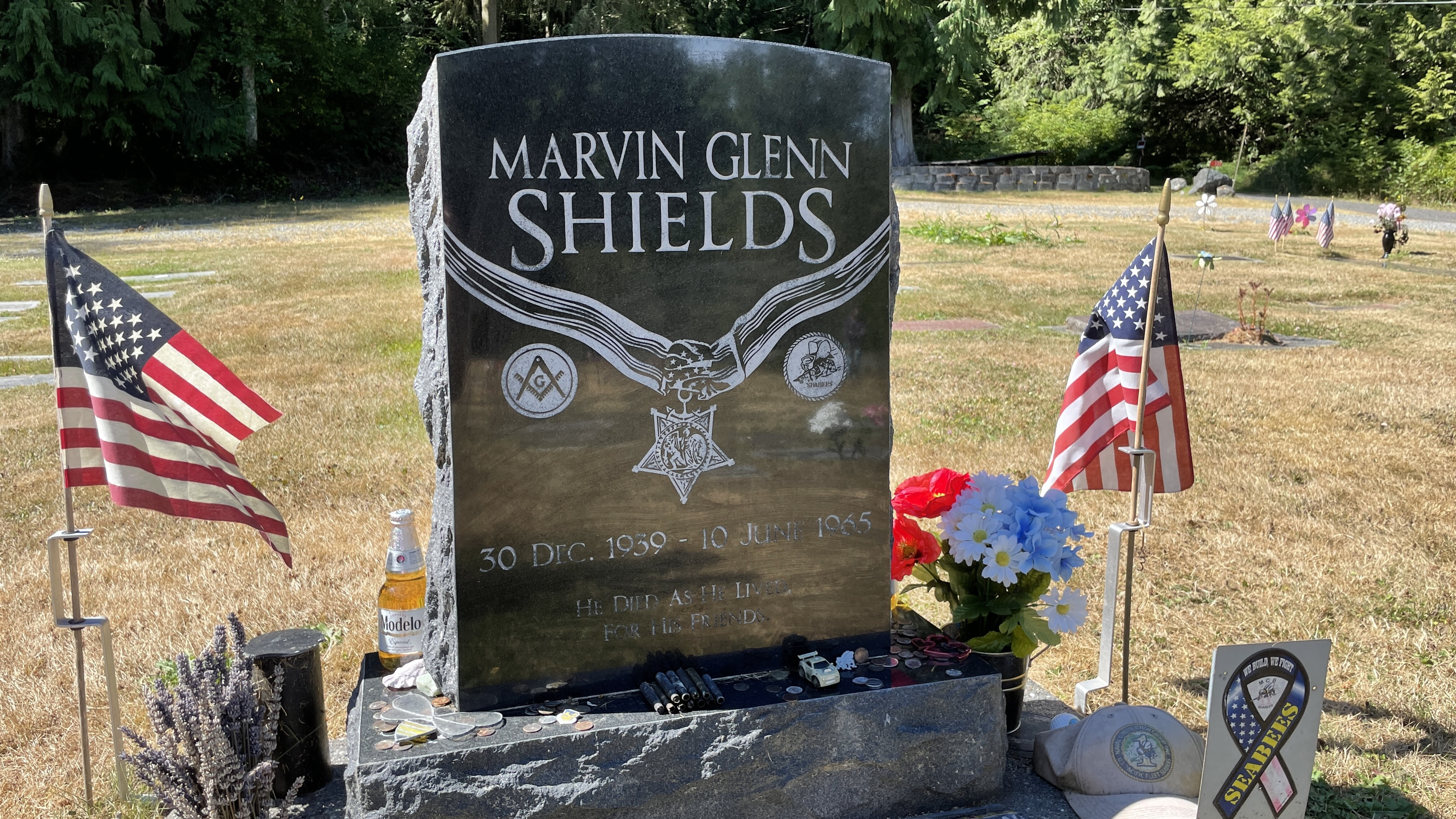
Marvin Glenn Shields' grave.

Shields was buried with a Marine Corps honor guard at Gardiner Cemetery, Gardiner, Washington on June 19, 1965. His name is listed on the Vietnam Veterans Memorial on Panel 02E, Row 007.

==== Medal of Honor ====
Shields was posthumously presented the Medal of Honor at a ceremony at the White House on September 13, 1966. His wife received the award from President Lyndon B. Johnson in the presence of his father, mother, daughter, and brother. Special Forces Lieutenant Williams was also present during the ceremony and had himself received the Medal of Honor on July 5, 1966, for his heroic actions during the 14-hour siege of the Special Forces Camp at Dong Xoai. All twenty of the Seabees and Special Forces soldiers were personally awarded for their actions at Dong Xoai.

== Awards and honors ==
Shields' other military decorations and awards include: the Purple Heart Medal with two Gold Stars, Navy Unit Commendation, Navy Good Conduct Medal, National Defense Service Medal, Vietnam Service Medal with two campaign stars, RVN Gallantry Cross with Palm, RVN Military Merit Medal, RVN Gallantry Cross Unit Citation with palm and frame, RVN Civil Actions Unit Citation with palm and frame, and RVN Campaign Medal with 1960- device.

Medal of Honor		Purple Heart w/ two 5/16" gold stars
Navy Unit Commendation	Navy Good Conduct Medal	National Defense Service Medal
Vietnam Service Medal w/ two 3/16" bronze stars	Republic of Vietnam Gallantry Cross w/ palm	Republic of Vietnam Military Merit Medal
Republic of Vietnam Civil Actions Unit Citation	Republic of Vietnam Gallantry Cross Unit Citation	Republic of Vietnam Campaign Medal

=== Medal of Honor citation ===
Shield's Medal of Honor Citation reads:

The President of the United States takes pride in presenting the MEDAL OF HONOR posthumously to

CONSTRUCTION MECHANIC THIRD CLASS MARVIN G. SHIELDS
UNITED STATES NAVY

for service as set forth in the following

CITATION:

For conspicuous gallantry and intrepidity at the risk of his life above and beyond the call of duty while serving with United States Navy Seabee Team 1104 at Dong Xoai, Republic of Vietnam, on 10 June 1965. Although wounded when the compound of Detachment A-342, 5th Special Forces Group (Airborne), 1st Special Forces, came under intense fire from an estimated reinforced Viet Cong regiment employing machine gun, heavy weapons and small arms, Shields continued to resupply his fellow Americans with needed ammunition and to return the enemy fire for a period of approximately three hours, at which time the Viet Cong launched a massive attack at close range with flame throwers, hand grenades and small-arms fire. Wounded a second time during this attack, Shields nevertheless assisted in carrying a more critically wounded man to safety, and then resumed firing at the enemy for four more hours. When the Commander asked for a volunteer to accompany him in an attempt to knock out an enemy machine gun emplacement which was endangering the lives of all personnel in the compound because of the accuracy of its fire, Shields unhesitatingly volunteered for this extremely hazardous mission. Proceeding toward their objective with a 3.5-inch rocket launcher, they succeeded in destroying the enemy machine gun emplacement, thus undoubtedly saving the lives of many of their fellow servicemen in the compound. Shields was mortally wounded by hostile fire while returning to his defensive position. His heroic initiative and great personal valor in the face of intense enemy fire sustain and enhance the finest tradition of the United States Naval Service.

LYNDON B. JOHNSON

=== Namesake ===
- The USS Marvin Shields (FF-1066) was named for him.
- Camp Marvin G. Shields, a forward deployed Naval Mobile Construction Battalion support base in Okinawa, Japan, was named in his memory.

== See also ==
- List of Medal of Honor recipients
- List of Medal of Honor recipients for the Vietnam War
