= Construction mechanic (United States Navy) =

Seabee occupational rating in the U.S. Navy

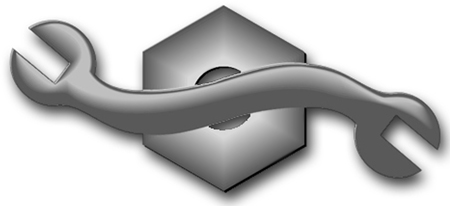
- Rating insignia
- Issued by: United States Navy
- Type: Enlisted rating
- Abbreviation: CM
- Specialty: Construction

Construction mechanic (abbreviated as CM) is a United States Navy occupational rating.

A Construction Mechanic (CM) is a specialized role within the United States Navy, particularly within the Navy Seabees. The Seabees are the construction battalions of the Navy, tasked with providing construction and engineering support to military operations worldwide. Construction Mechanics play a vital role in ensuring the operational readiness of heavy machinery and vehicles crucial for construction projects.

Duties and Responsibilities:

Construction Mechanics in the Navy are responsible for a range of duties related to the maintenance and repair of construction equipment. Key responsibilities include:

- Equipment Maintenance: Construction Mechanics are trained to maintain and repair various types of heavy construction equipment, including buses, dump trucks, bulldozers, rollers, cranes, backhoes, pile drivers, and tactical vehicles.
- Vehicle Maintenance: They oversee the maintenance and repair of military vehicles essential for construction operations, ensuring they remain in optimal condition.
- Construction Support: Construction Mechanics work collaboratively with other Seabees to provide mechanical support during construction projects, ensuring that machinery operates effectively and safely.
- Welding and Fabrication: Some Construction Mechanics possess skills in welding and metal fabrication, contributing to the construction and repair of structures and equipment as needed.
- Technical Expertise: Construction Mechanics require technical knowledge in areas such as engine repair, hydraulics, and electrical systems to troubleshoot and fix equipment issues promptly.

Training and Qualifications:

Individuals pursuing a career as a Construction Mechanic in the U.S. Navy typically undergo rigorous training that covers mechanical systems, equipment operation, and maintenance procedures. "A" school is held in Port Hueneme, California, for approximately 16 weeks. This training equips them with the skills necessary to handle the challenges of maintaining and repairing heavy construction machinery in various operational environments.

Occupational Rating:

The Construction Mechanic (abbreviated as CM) is recognized as a United States Navy occupational rating. Construction mechanics perform tasks involved in the maintenance, repair, and overhaul of automotive, materials handling, and construction equipment. They also assign and supervise activities of assistants, analyze and correct malfunctions, issue repair parts, maintain records, prepare requisitions and reports, and train assistants in repair procedures and techniques. Additionally, construction mechanics maintain individual combat readiness and perform tasks required in combat and disaster preparedness or recovery operations.

Additional Duties and Requirements:

Enlistment Program: This is a 5-year enlistment program. Tasks and Responsibilities: Construction Mechanics repair and maintain heavy construction and automotive equipment, prepare detailed maintenance records and cost control data, and acquire parts. They make estimates of material, labor, and equipment requirements.

Working Environment: Many construction mechanics perform in an automotive garage environment, while some work in the field to maintain equipment. They usually work closely with others under close supervision and perform both physical and mental tasks. Their duties may be performed in climates ranging from desert to arctic.

ASVAB Requirements: ASVAB score of AR + MC + AS = 162 is required.

Obligated Service: 36-month obligated service is required for all converts and PACT Sailors.

Prospective CMs should be able to:

Use various tools, equipment, and machines. Possess manual dexterity. Keep records, do detailed work, and perform repetitive tasks. Demonstrate resourcefulness, curiosity, good memory, and an interest in ideas and information. Have strong arithmetic, speaking, and writing skills. Maintain good physical condition. Exhibit a cooperative attitude.

Career Path:

Following completion of basic technical training, Construction Mechanics may expect assignments to a Naval Mobile Construction Battalion (NMCB) in Port Hueneme, CA, or Gulfport, MS, or to an Amphibious Construction Battalion (ACB) in San Diego, CA, or Little Creek, VA. NMCBs operate on a rotating basis between homeport and overseas locations such as Spain, Okinawa, or Guam. Seabees receive additional specialized combat and construction skills training during home port duty. Seabees construct buildings, roadways, utility systems, and other shore facilities to support the Navy and Marine Corps operational and expeditionary forces worldwide. Upon reaching Master Chief Petty Officer (E-9), Construction Mechanics merge with all other construction ratings as a Master Chief Seabee (abbreviated as CBCM).

Notable Construction Mechanics

- Marvin G Shields (1939 – 1965) was a Construction Mechanic Third Class (CMA3) in the United States Navy Seabees. He is notably the only Seabee to have received the Medal of Honor, the highest military decoration in the United States, for his actions during the Vietnam War.

== History ==
Initially emerging from the Seabee ratings of Machinist's Mate (Equipment Operators) and the Motor Machinist's Mate, the rating underwent changes to better align with the diverse skill sets needed for construction projects. In 1948, the Mechanic rating amalgamated aspects of equipment operation and motorized vehicle maintenance. This designation later transformed into the Construction Mechanic rating in 1958, reflecting a comprehensive role in the mechanics of both construction equipment and various vehicles crucial for Seabee construction endeavors.

Decommissioned versions of the rate:

- CM - Mechanic (after 1948) (changed to Construction Mechanic - 1952)
- CMA - Construction Mechanic (Automobile) (after 1945)
- CMD - Construction Mechanic (Diesel Engine)
- CMG - Construction Mechanic (Gasoline Engine)
- CMH - Construction Mechanic (Construction)

== See also ==
- List of United States Navy ratings
