= Đồng Xoài (city) =

- Provincial city (Class-3)
- Đồng Xoài City; Thành phố Đồng Xoài
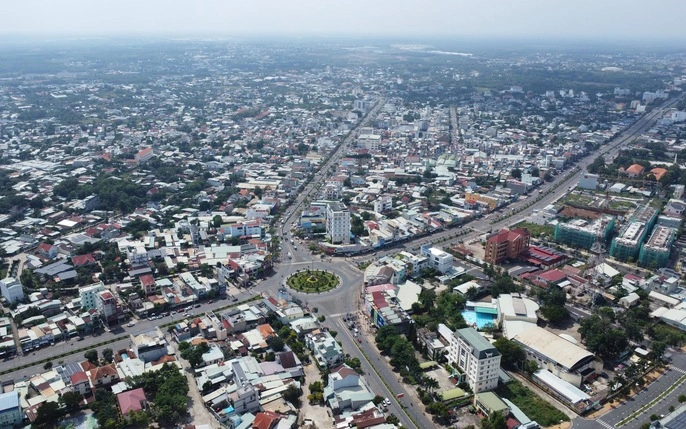

- Seal
- /0/queryThe property query is required; /0/idsThe property ids is required; /0Failed to match at least one schema; /0/titleThe property title is required; /0/serviceDoes not have a value in the enumeration ["page"]; /0Failed to match exactly one schema; /0/geometriesThe property geometries is required; /0/typeDoes not have a value in the enumeration ["GeometryCollection"]; /0/typeDoes not have a value in the enumeration ["MultiPolygon"]; /0/typeDoes not have a value in the enumeration ["Point"]; /0/typeDoes not have a value in the enumeration ["MultiPoint"]; /0/typeDoes not have a value in the enumeration ["LineString"]; /0/typeDoes not have a value in the enumeration ["MultiLineString"]; /0/typeDoes not have a value in the enumeration ["Polygon"]; /0/coordinatesThe property coordinates is required; /0/geometryThe property geometry is required; /0/typeDoes not have a value in the enumeration ["Feature"]; /0/featuresThe property features is required; /0/typeDoes not have a value in the enumeration ["FeatureCollection"]
- Location within Vietnam
- Coordinates (region:VN_type:city): 11°31′1″N 106°50′21″E
- Country: Vietnam
- Province: Bình Phước Province

Area
  - Total: 169.05 km^{2} (65.27 sq mi)

Population (2019)
  - Total: 168,000
  - Density: 998/km^{2} (2,580/sq mi)
- Time zone: UTC+7 (Indochina Time)
- Climate: Am
- Website: dongxoai.binhphuoc.gov.vn

Đồng Xoài is the former capital city of Bình Phước Province in the Southeast region of Vietnam. The city was the site of the 1965 Battle of Đồng Xoài during the Vietnam War. As of 2019, the district had a population of 168,000, and a total area of 169.05 km^{2} (65.27 sq mi). The district capital lies at Đồng Xoài. Đồng Xoài is located on an elevation of 88.63 m above the sea level, 101 km north from Ho Chi Minh City, 90 km from the Hoa Lư border crossing. Đồng Xoài is connected through national highway 14.

== Administrative division ==
Đồng Xoài consists of 6 wards (phường) and 2 communes (xã):

- Wards: Tân Bình, Tân Đồng, Tân Phú, Tân Thiện, Tân Xuân, Tiến Thành
- Communes: Tân Thành, Tiến Hưng.

== Climate ==
Climate data for Đồng Xoài (Đồng Phú)
Month	Jan	Feb	Mar	Apr	May	Jun	Jul	Aug	Sep	Oct	Nov	Dec	Year
Record high °C (°F)	37.7 (99.9)	38.2 (100.8)	40.6 (105.1)	40.2 (104.4)	40.0 (104.0)	36.5 (97.7)	35.5 (95.9)	35.1 (95.2)	35.5 (95.9)	35.7 (96.3)	35.0 (95.0)	36.2 (97.2)	40.6 (105.1)
Mean daily maximum °C (°F)	32.9 (91.2)	34.4 (93.9)	35.5 (95.9)	35.6 (96.1)	34.2 (93.6)	32.5 (90.5)	31.9 (89.4)	31.7 (89.1)	31.6 (88.9)	31.8 (89.2)	32.1 (89.8)	31.9 (89.4)	33.0 (91.4)
Daily mean °C (°F)	25.3 (77.5)	26.4 (79.5)	27.8 (82.0)	28.4 (83.1)	28.0 (82.4)	27.0 (80.6)	26.5 (79.7)	26.4 (79.5)	26.2 (79.2)	26.1 (79.0)	25.7 (78.3)	25.1 (77.2)	26.6 (79.9)
Mean daily minimum °C (°F)	19.8 (67.6)	20.5 (68.9)	22.3 (72.1)	23.9 (75.0)	24.3 (75.7)	23.9 (75.0)	23.5 (74.3)	23.5 (74.3)	23.3 (73.9)	22.9 (73.2)	21.8 (71.2)	20.3 (68.5)	22.5 (72.5)
Record low °C (°F)	11.9 (53.4)	15.1 (59.2)	16.8 (62.2)	19.2 (66.6)	20.9 (69.6)	21.3 (70.3)	20.9 (69.6)	20.6 (69.1)	20.7 (69.3)	17.8 (64.0)	15.2 (59.4)	14.3 (57.7)	11.9 (53.4)
Average rainfall mm (inches)	9.9 (0.39)	15.8 (0.62)	48.2 (1.90)	150.5 (5.93)	260.2 (10.24)	327.0 (12.87)	348.7 (13.73)	374.5 (14.74)	430.3 (16.94)	362.1 (14.26)	156.7 (6.17)	46.1 (1.81)	2,538.7 (99.95)
Average rainy days	1.8	1.9	4.6	10.6	18.6	21.8	23.8	23.8	24.8	22.5	12.7	4.9	171.8
Average relative humidity (%)	71.0	69.1	68.9	74.4	80.3	84.4	86.1	87.1	87.6	86.2	81.4	74.8	79.3
Mean monthly sunshine hours	253.4	243.6	260.0	245.1	230.8	185.3	179.3	167.2	157.7	191.4	211.9	225.9	2,552
Source: Vietnam Institute for Building Science and Technology
