= Charles Q. Williams =

United States Army major and Medal of Honor recipient

- Army Medal of Honor
- Born: Charles Quincy Williams; September 17, 1933; Charleston, South Carolina, US
- Died: October 15, 1982 (aged 49); Columbia, South Carolina
- Burial place: Arlington National Cemetery, Arlington County, Virginia
- Military career
- Allegiance: United States
- Branch: United States Army
- Service years: 1958–1978
- Rank: Major
- Units: Detachment 342, 5th Special Forces Group, 1st Special Forces
- Conflicts: Vietnam War -Battle of Dong Xoai
- Awards: Medal of Honor; Purple Heart (4)

Charles Quincy Williams (September 17, 1933 – October 15, 1982) was a United States Army major and a recipient of the United States military's highest decoration—the Medal of Honor—for heroism above and beyond the call of duty as an Army Special Forces second lieutenant in the Vietnam War.

== Biography ==
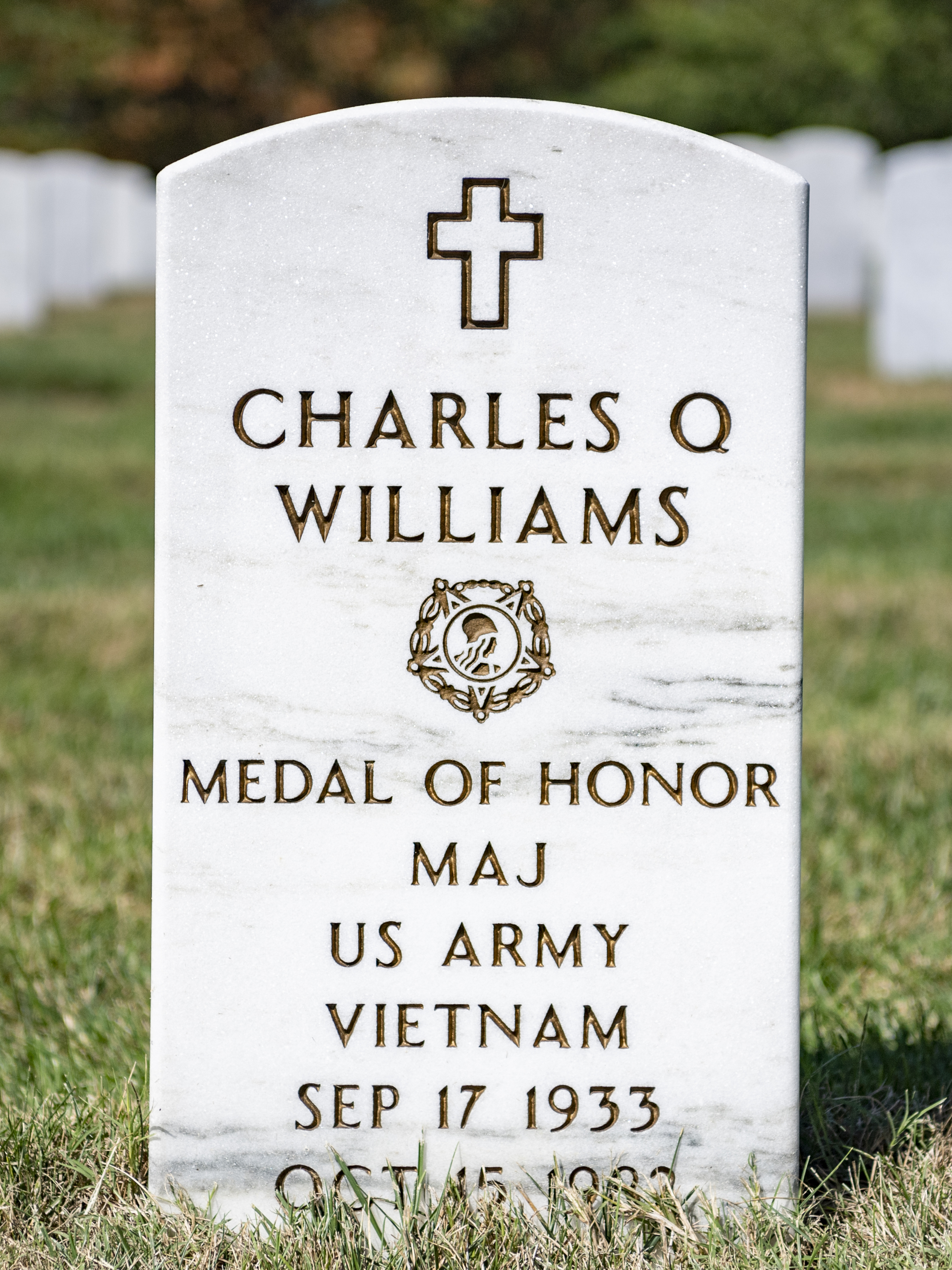
Williams' grave at Arlington National Cemetery

Williams joined the U.S. Army from Fort Jackson, South Carolina in 1958. After serving as a NCO and paratrooper in a heavy weapons Company, he later attended Officer Candidate School and by June 9, 1965 was serving as a Second Lieutenant with the 5th Special Forces Group.

On that day, in Dong Xoai, Republic of Vietnam, the Special Forces camp where Williams was the executive officer of a Special Forces "A" Team, was attacked by a Vietcong regiment. As the battle raged through the night and into the next day, Williams was in command of the camp which consisted of two compounds after the Special Forces commander was badly wounded. He coordinated the defense and, eventually, the evacuation of the wounded from the camp which included besides the Special Forces compound, the district headquarters compound. He was wounded four separate times during the fourteen-hour siege on the camp. He was subsequently promoted to First Lieutenant and, on July 5, 1966, he was presented the Medal of Honor for his actions during the battle.

Williams reached the rank of major before leaving the Army in 1978. He died at age 49 and was buried in Arlington National Cemetery, Arlington County, Virginia.

Williams was featured in the Medal of Honor Special comic written by Doug Murray and published by Dark Horse comics. The comic was a special edition of the series Medal of Honor, published April 1, 1994. The title was sanctioned by the United States Congressional Medal of Honor Society. The issue features Lt. Williams along with another Medal of Honor recipient Cpl. Desmond Doss. The comic depicts the wartime experience of Williams during the event in which he earned his Medal of Honor.

== Medal of Honor citation ==
First Lieutenant Williams' official Medal of Honor citation reads:

1st Lt. Williams distinguished himself by conspicuous gallantry and intrepidity at the risk of his life above and beyond the call of duty while defending the Special Forces Camp against a violent attack by hostile forces that lasted for 14 hours. 1st Lt. Williams was serving as executive officer of a Special Forces Detachment when an estimated Vietcong reinforced regiment struck the camp and threatened to overrun it and the adjacent district headquarters. He awoke personnel, organized them, determined the source of the insurgents' main effort and led the troops to their defensive positions on the south and west walls. Then, after running to the District Headquarters to establish communications, he found that there was no radio operational with which to communicate with his commanding officer in another compound. To reach the other compound, he traveled through darkness but was halted in this effort by a combination of shrapnel in his right leg and the increase of the Vietcong gunfire. Ignoring his wound, he returned to the district headquarters and directed the defense against the first assault. As the insurgents attempted to scale the walls and as some of the Vietnamese defenders began to retreat, he dashed through a barrage of gunfire, succeeded in rallying these defenders, and led them back to their positions. Although wounded in the thigh and left leg during this gallant action, he returned to his position and, upon being told that communications were reestablished and that his commanding officer was seriously wounded, 1st Lt. Williams took charge of actions in both compounds. Then, in an attempt to reach the communications bunker, he sustained wounds in the stomach and right arm from grenade fragments. As the defensive positions on the walls had been held for hours and casualties were mounting, he ordered the consolidation of the American personnel from both compounds to establish a defense in the district building. After radio contact was made with a friendly air controller, he disregarded his wounds and directed the defense from the District building, using descending flares as reference points to adjust air strikes. By his courage, he inspired his team to hold out against the insurgent force that was closing in on them and throwing grenades into the windows of the building. As daylight arrived and the Vietcong continued to besiege the stronghold, firing a machinegun directly south of the district building, he was determined to eliminate this menace that threatened the lives of his men. Taking a 3.5 rocket launcher and a volunteer to load it, he worked his way across open terrain, reached the berm south of the district headquarters, and took aim at the Vietcong machinegun 150 meters away. Although the sight was faulty, he succeeded in hitting the machinegun. While he and the loader were trying to return to the district headquarters, they were both wounded. With a fourth wound, this time in the right arm and leg, and realizing he was unable to carry his wounded comrade back to the district building, 1st Lt. Williams pulled him to a covered position and then made his way back to the district building where he sought the help of others who went out and evacuated the injured soldier. Although seriously wounded and tired, he continued to direct the air strikes closer to the defensive position. As morning turned to afternoon and the Vietcong pressed their effort with direct recoilless rifle fire into the building, he ordered the evacuation of the seriously wounded to the safety of the communications bunker. When informed that helicopters would attempt to land as the hostile gunfire had abated, he led his team from the building to the artillery position, making certain of the timely evacuation of the wounded from the communications area, and then on to the pickup point. Despite resurgent Vietcong gunfire, he directed the rapid evacuation of all personnel. Throughout the long battle, he was undaunted by the vicious Vietcong assault and inspired the defenders in decimating the determined insurgents. 1st Lt. Williams' extraordinary heroism, are in the highest traditions of the U.S. Army and reflect great credit upon himself and the Armed Forces of his country.

== See also ==
- List of Medal of Honor recipients
- List of Medal of Honor recipients for the Vietnam War
