= Battle of Đồng Xoài =

1965 battle of the Vietnam War

- Part of the Vietnam War
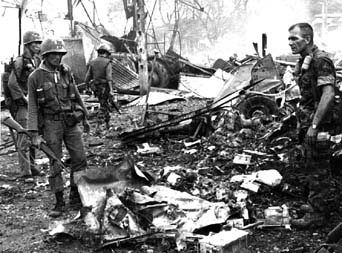
- Soldiers of the ARVN 52nd Ranger Battalion (left) and a US Army advisor (right) in Đồng Xoài.
Date	9–13 June 1965 (5 days)
Location	Đồng Xoài, Phước Long Province (now Đồng Nai City), South Vietnam 11°32′14″N 106°53′46″E
Result	Viet Cong victory

Belligerents
Viet Cong	South Vietnam; United States

Commanders and leaders
Lê Trọng Tấn; Trần Độ	Cao Văn Viên; William Westmoreland

Units involved
B2 Front: 271st Regiment; 272nd Regiment; 273rd Regiment (-); a 75mm recoilless rifle company; an artillery battalion; two 75mm + two 70mm howitzers; 9 flame-throwers; an AAA company; a mortar company; Military Region 6: 840th Battalion; Phước Long Province Command; 2 sapper platoons of Local Force	III Corps: 7/5 Infantry Regiment; 1st Battalion; 111th RF Company; 327th Militia Company; 328th Militia Company; six armored cars; two 105mm howitzers; 3rd Ranger Group; 36th Battalion (-); 52nd Battalion; Airbone: 7th Airborne Battalion; 5th Special Force: Team A-342; Seabee team 1104; 3 CIDG companies; 12th Combat Aviation: 118th Aviation Company

Casualties and losses
US body count: 300 killed VC claim: 134 killed, 290 wounded	416 killed, 174 wounded, 233 missing 18 killed VC claim: 608 killed (including 42 US)

The Battle of Đồng Xoài (Vietnamese: Trận Đồng Xoài) was a major battle fought during the Vietnam War as part of the Viet Cong (VC) Summer Offensive of 1965. It took place in Phước Long Province, South Vietnam, between 9 and 13 June 1965.

Political instability in Saigon gave North Vietnamese leaders an opportunity to step up their military campaign in the south. They believed that the South Vietnamese government's power relied on the country's strong military, so the North Vietnamese People's Army of Vietnam (PAVN) and VC launched the Summer Offensive of 1965 to inflict significant losses on South Vietnamese forces. In Phước Long Province, the PAVN/VC summer offensive culminated in the Đồng Xoài campaign.

The fight for Đồng Xoài began on the evening of 9 June 1965, when the VC 272nd Regiment attacked and captured the Civilian Irregular Defense Group and US Special Forces camp there. The Army of the Republic of Vietnam (ARVN) Joint General Staff responded to the sudden assault by ordering the ARVN 1st Battalion of the 7/5 Infantry to retake the district of Đồng Xoài. The ARVN forces arrived on the battlefield on 10 June but in the vicinity of Thuận Lợi, the VC 271st Regiment overwhelmed the South Vietnamese battalion. Later that day, the ARVN 52nd Ranger Battalion, which had survived an ambush while marching towards Đồng Xoài, recaptured the district. On 11 June the ARVN 7th Airborne Battalion arrived to reinforce the South Vietnamese position; as the Airborne were searching the Thuận Lợi rubber plantation for survivors from the 1st Battalion, the VC caught them in a deadly ambush.

On 13 June COMUSMACV General William Westmoreland, fearing that the VC might secure enough area to establish a large base in Phước Long Province, decided to insert elements of the US 173rd Airborne Brigade into a major battle for the first time. By then, however, the VC had already withdrawn from the battlefield, and the US paratroopers were ordered to return to base without having engaged with the VC.

== Background ==
Since the overthrow of President Ngo Dinh Diem in November 1963, political turmoil in South Vietnam severely undermined the fight against the VC insurgency. From the Communist perspective, even though South Vietnam was plagued by political instability, it still had a strong army to resist the VC. So shortly after the Binh Gia campaign, North Vietnamese leaders reached a resolution to launch a summer offensive, to destroy the regular units of the South Vietnamese military. During the early stages of the Communist summer campaign, VC forces in Quảng Ngãi Province successfully destroyed a South Vietnamese task force, led by the ARVN 51st Infantry Regiment, in the village of Ba Gia. Following their victory at Ba Gia, the VC turned its attention to the Mekong Delta region. To prepare for their next offensive, Major general Lê Trọng Tấn was given the task of directing VC military operations in the province of Phước Long. For the first time, the newly created VC 273rd and 274th Regiments was ordered to join the 271st and 272nd Regiments on the battlefield; their objective was to destroy the regular units of the South Vietnamese military and eliminate the strategic hamlets to enlarge what North Vietnam viewed as liberated zones and that, in view of the forced relocation, the compulsory labor, the fund diversion by corrupt officers and the burning of old villages implied, were labelled by Noam Chomsky "virtual concentration camps".

== Prelude ==
Since May 1965, the VC offensive in Phước Long Province had been in full-swing. Beginning on 10 May the VC 271st Regiment, supported by the 840th Battalion and local sapper units, attacked the district town of Phước Long, capital of the province. Simultaneously, the VC 272nd Regiment overran South Vietnamese government positions in the sub-sector of Phước Bình. In the subsequent Battle of Sông Bé, South Vietnamese losses were 58 dead, 96 wounded, and 83 missing. Five Americans died in the fighting, and 13 were wounded. The allies variously reported civilian casualties as between 12 and 80 people. US advisers on the scene reported that 297 VC had been killed. MACV speculated that VC casualties could have been as high as 1,000 killed or injured.

Meanwhile, on 15 May, the VC 274th Regiment defeated two South Vietnamese Regional Force companies along Route 20. To keep rescue forces at bay, the VC deployed blocking forces and bombarded the nearby district town of Định Quán. Only allied aircraft were able to lend support to the stricken convoy. The VC destroyed 14 vehicles, killed 45 ARVN, and wounded 25. Ten soldiers went missing and the VC captured a mortar, three machine guns, and 89 small arms. Two American advisors were killed.

After those operations the VC 9th Division was ordered to attack Đồng Xoài. Đồng Xoài was a district seat in southern Phước Long Province, nestled in sparsely populated country dominated by forests and rubber plantations. Outside the range of most friendly artillery, the town sat astride a strategic road junction which connected Inter-Provisional Road 13, National Highway 1 and Highway 14.

Two fortifications protected Đồng Xoài. The first was the district military headquarters and the second was a Civilian Irregular Defense Group (CIDG) post. Six armored cars and two 105mm howitzers occupied a protected corridor between the two posts. The district was defended by 200 local Vietnamese soldiers drawn from the 327th and 328th Militia Companies, and the 111th Regional Force Company. There were also 400 soldiers from three CIDG companies, 11 United States Army Special Forces personnel and nine men of Seabee Team 1104. Prior to the battle, the US Special Forces had assumed control of Đồng Xoài's defences; they stepped up guard and patrol activities, and ordered the construction of new defensive fortifications around the district headquarters, the Special Forces Camp and the armored and artillery positions on the eastern side of the district.

To conquer Đồng Xoài, the B-2 Front sent the VC 272nd Regiment, a battalion of the 273rd Regiment, a 75mm recoilless rifle company; and an artillery battalion that possessed two 75mm pack howitzers, two 70mm pack howitzers, an anti-aircraft machine-gun company, an 82mm mortar company, and a flame-thrower company equipped with nine Chinese flame-throwers. Another formation, the 271st Regiment, sat in reserve at the nearby Thuận Lợi rubber plantation. On the evening of 9 June 1965, this force crept to within 100 meters of Đồng Xoài's defenses, with weapons wrapped in fabric to muffle the sound. The VC then began to dig emplacements for their supporting weapons with the intention of launching an assault at midnight. However, something went wrong. What happened remains unclear, but some of the VC opened fire prematurely, beginning the fight before the VC were fully ready to launch the attack.

== Battle ==
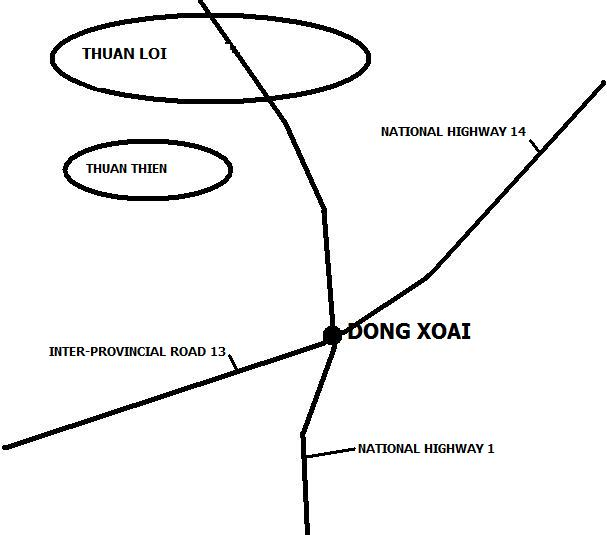
Đồng Xoài in 1965

At 23:30, VC mortar rounds began to fall on South Vietnamese and American positions around Đồng Xoài, soon followed by an infantry assault led by the 272nd Regiment. During the initial assault, the VC sustained heavy casualties as they tried to navigate through the surrounding minefields and barbwire fences, which they had failed to pick up during previous reconnaissance missions. The VC commander suspended the assault to reorganize his forces. He called up the reserve sappers and moved some of his artillery closer to the perimeter. The second assault got underway at 01:00 on 10 June. This time, the VC succeeded in crossing the barbed wire at one location by having soldiers lay down on top of it so that others could walk on their bodies. Safely across, and with their artillery knocking out a key bunker at the special forces camp, VC forces surged over the protective berm and began clearing the trenches using flamethrowers, B–40 rockets, grenades, and demolition charges. Most of the Strikers at the special forces camp withdrew into Đồng Xoài village. At the district headquarters, however, the assault failed, necessitating a third attack.

At about 01:30, two helicopter gunships from the US Army's 118th Aviation Company were dispatched to support the camp, they fired on the VC around the compound, and returned to base only after their weapons load was emptied. At around 02:30, the Americans and a few of the Cambodian soldiers retreated to the district headquarters, where other local troops were holding out. Meanwhile, at Biên Hòa Air Base, all flight crews of the 118th Aviation Company were on the flightline preparing for combat assault at first light. By that time, however, the VC had captured the compound, and they began massing for an attack on the district headquarters.

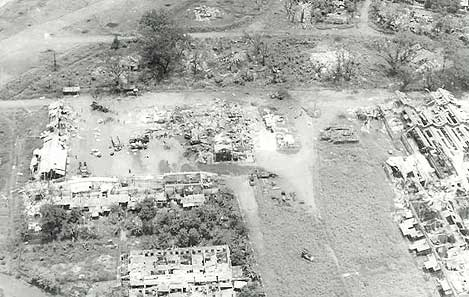
An aerial view of Đồng Xoài

While fighting raged inside the district, all flyable aircraft from the 118th Aviation Company flew out from Biên Hòa to Phước Vĩnh Base Camp, about 30 kilometres from Đồng Xoài. From Phước Vĩnh the first contingent of the ARVN 1st Battalion, 7th Infantry Regiment, was airlifted into the battlefield. With little information, the Americans chose a landing zone 3 kilometers north of Đồng Xoài for the first lift bearing half of the 1st Battalion — 166 men and two advisers. USAF A-1s bombed the landing area just before the helicopters arrived. As they were making their final approach at 09:43, pilots spotted civilians waving to them from the edge of the landing zone. The aircraft held their fire and touched down, only to see the "civilians" dive into foxholes and retrieve weapons. The helicopters unloaded quickly and returned to the air with little damage, but a withering fire cut down many South Vietnamese soldiers. USAF F–100s and A–1s did what they could, but the situation was hopeless. At 10:30, an adviser reported that the VC were overrunning the defenders. The radio then fell silent.

The Americans opted for a different landing zone to deposit the rest of the 1st Battalion. The new site was an airstrip located at the headquarters of the Thuận Lợi rubber plantation, 6 kilometers from Đồng Xoài. The 5th Division's senior adviser, Colonel Robert D. Marsh, asked the division's commander, Major general Phạm Quốc Thuần, to launch a preliminary airstrike. Thuần refused on the grounds that the Frenchman who owned the plantation was a friend of the government. After scout helicopters failed to draw fire in repeated low-level passes, the 14 transport helicopters from the 118th Aviation Company were about to descend when they saw a herd of cattle heading for the landing site. The lead pilot decided to land short, and it proved a fortuitous decision. As the first helicopter landed, a huge explosion rocked the original site. Within seconds of the landing at 12:55, the VC hit the allies with automatic weapons and mortar fire. One mortar round exploded next to a helicopter, destroying it. The fire was so intense that the lead aviator aborted the landing after only 80 soldiers had disembarked. The surviving helicopters beat a hasty retreat, every machine but one damaged. At 13:15, the 5th Division lost radio contact with the 80 men left behind.

During the afternoon, the VC had managed to destroy parts of the district headquarters building using their 57 mm recoilless rifle. Second lieutenant Williams then ordered 14 Americans inside the building, along with an equal number of Vietnamese women and children, to retreat to the artillery position located east of the town where they continued their resistance. Upon hearing this, the commander of the 118th Aviation Company led a rescue mission. As the gunships approached the special forces camp, they knocked out two armored cars the VC had captured. Swooping in low, the transports landed at the post soccer field, taking intense fire from all directions. At 13:55, a crew chief disembarked, rushed to the artillery position, and brought out the survivors - nine wounded Americans and eight Vietnamese. The VC badly damaged one of the helicopters, so everyone had to clamber aboard the other two craft. Mortar shells exploded all around them as the overloaded UH-1s struggled to get airborne, but they escaped.

The helicopter extraction marked the end of the battle for the district compound, but, elsewhere, pockets of defenders remained. A CIDG company occupying a detached post 1,500 meters east of the special forces camp repulsed the VC, while some Strikers fought on in the town. In addition, two wounded Seabees who had become separated from the rest of the defenders so far had evaded capture.

Determined to retake Đồng Xoài, MACV marshalled the rest of the 145th Aviation Battalion at Phước Vĩnh as US and RVNAF aircraft continued to pound the VC. The intensity of the aerial assault led a VC commander to cry into his field telephone, "My God! It's brutal, brutal." At 16:55, Army aviators once more braved intense antiaircraft fire to deliver 330 men of the 52nd Ranger Battalion just 45 meters away from the VC positions at the special forces camp. "The only thing that saved us was the element of surprise. They never thought we'd land so close," reflected Captain James Sterling. VC gunners destroyed one helicopter and damaged three others. By nightfall, the rangers had secured the camp in heavy fighting. The VC eventually launched a counter-attack in an attempt to win back the lost ground, but they failed to dislodge the soldiers of the ARVN 52nd Ranger Battalion.

At 09:00 on 11 June, the rangers came upon the two wounded Seabees and arranged for their medical evacuation. Meanwhile, US Army helicopters delivered the 470-man 7th Airborne Battalion to Đồng Xoài, and the 5th Division brought in a ranger company and some 105mm howitzers. The Airborne fought their way into town, securing it by 14:30. They then advanced to investigate the first location where US helicopters had delivered part of the 1st Battalion, 7th Infantry, on 10 June. They found five wounded soldiers and the corpses of 60 more, including those of the two US advisers. After the Airborne troopers were dropped off, the 118th Aviation Company started large-scale evacuation of South Vietnamese casualties. In contrast to the previous day, the helicopters encountered only isolated fire.

On the morning of 12 June, the 7th Airborne Battalion, now down to about 400 men, marched to the second landing location at the Thuận Lợi plantation landing strip, where they collected seven survivors and 55 bodies. The commander sent three platoons ahead to investigate and, when they found nothing, ordered the rest of the battalion to join them. Suddenly, shrapnel from Claymore mines and bullets from machine guns and small arms rent the air. The VC 271st Regiment had caught the Airborne troops in a trap. Taking advantage of the poor weather conditions that had limited US airstrikes, as well as their numerical superiority, the VC broke the Airborne formation into small groups and destroyed many of them. Some soldiers fled toward a road where they came under fire from two armored cars that the VC had captured at Đồng Xoài. Allied aircraft lent support, but the VC shot down an F-100 jet. Major Stewart landed his helicopter, and he and another crewman went forward to rescue the downed pilot, but the VC chased them away. As the situation became untenable, the US Army sent in a helicopter to evacuate the 7th Airborne's two US advisers and five wounded Vietnamese. Army helicopters also delivered an infantry battalion from the 10th Division to help extricate the Airborne. The fighting lasted into the night. About 150 Airborne troops eventually made it back to Đồng Xoài. The rest died or were captured.

After the defeat of the ARVN 7th Airborne Battalion, US General William Westmoreland concluded that the VC still had the strength to continue the attacks on Đồng Xoài. In contrast, South Vietnamese forces within the vicinity of Đồng Xoài were severely depleted, and did not have sufficient strength to defeat the VC. Furthermore, there was only one remaining battalion in South Vietnam's strategic reserve, and it might not be enough to drive the VC out from the area if it was committed.

Westmoreland was unwilling to leave the VC with a position from which they could dominate Phước Long Province. So, on 13 June, he made the decision to insert US combat forces from 173rd Airborne Brigade. Subsequently, 738 men of the 1st Battalion, 503rd Infantry Regiment, were flown out to the staging area in Phước Vĩnh. Elements of the 3rd Battalion, 319th Field Artillery Regiment also followed later in the day. Upon arrival at Phước Vĩnh, the US Army task force waited for five days, but it soon became apparent that the VC had withdrawn from the area and had no intention of holding territory. On 18 June, the 1/503rd Infantry was ordered to return to base.

== Aftermath ==
In this battle both sides of the conflict had paid a heavy price to achieve their objectives. After the battle, search parties found more than 300 VC bodies and 104 weapons. The allies estimated that they had killed a further 625 VC. The South Vietnamese lost 416 killed, 174 wounded and 233 missing. US losses were 18 killed. About 300 civilians were killed in the battle and 2,500 became refugees.

According to Vietnam's official account of the Đồng Xoài campaign, from May to July 1965, they claimed to have put 4,459 enemy soldiers (including 73 Americans) out of action. Furthermore, 1,652 weapons of various kinds were captured, 390 weapons and 60 vehicles were destroyed, 34 aircraft and three helicopters were shot down. They claimed that their losses were 134 killed and 290 wounded.

For their efforts during the battle, the VC 272nd Regiment received the title of Đồng Xoài Regiment.

The 145th Aviation Battalion was awarded the Presidential Unit Citation. Charles Q. Williams was awarded the Medal of Honor for his actions during the battle. Seabee Marvin G. Shields was posthumously awarded the Medal of Honor for his actions during the battle.
