= Upolo =

UPolo, the British University Water Polo League, aims to improve the standard of water polo in UK by giving university teams more opportunity to play at a competitive level. The league, which runs during the academic year and culminates in a Finals tournament, is divided regionally which allows for accessible matches and a full calendar of fixtures in each semester.
