= USS Marvin Shields =

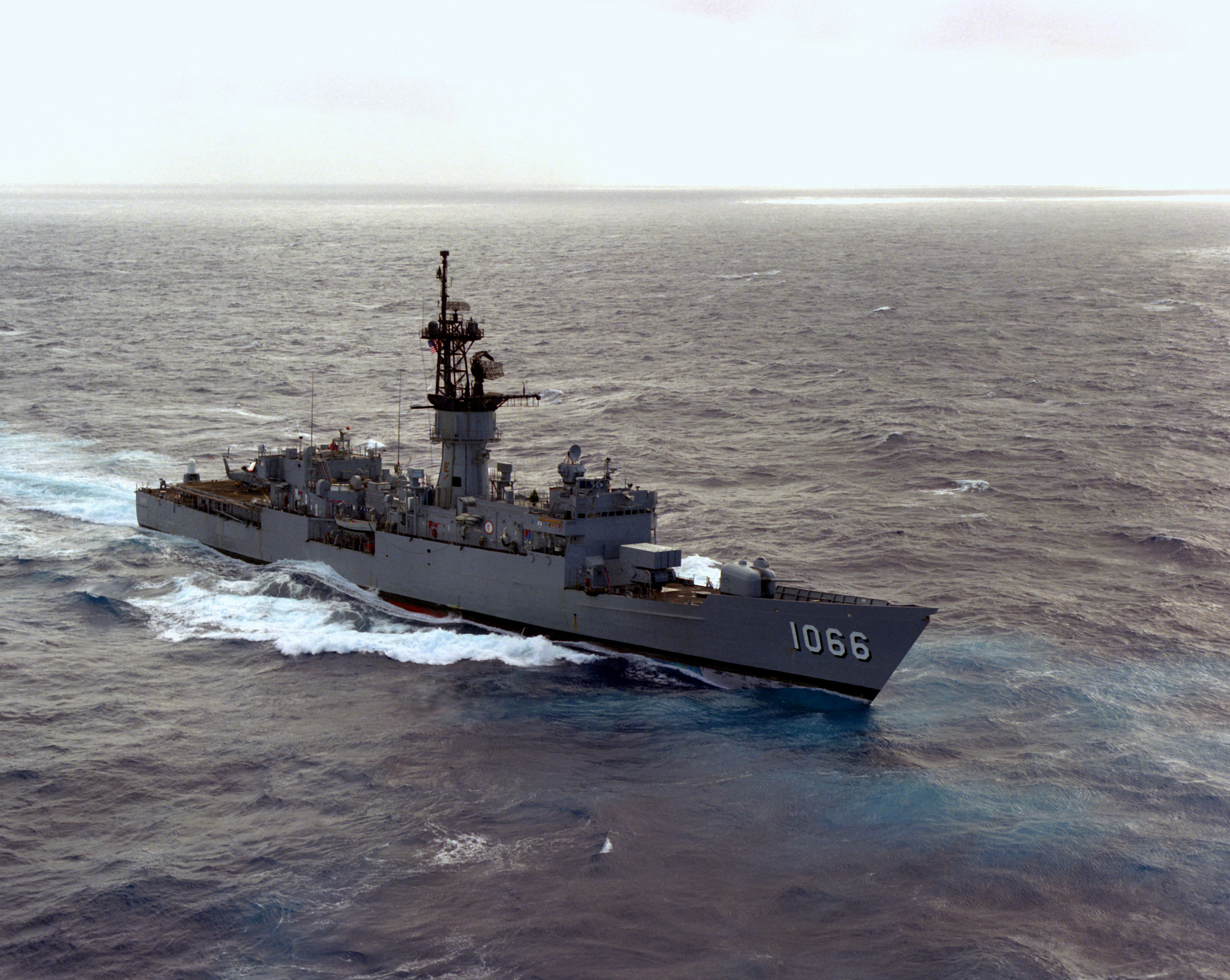
- USS Marvin Shields (FF-1066)

History

United States
- Name: Marvin Shields
- Namesake: Marvin Shields
- Ordered: 22 July 1964
- Builder: Todd Pacific Shipyards, Seattle, Washington
- Laid down: 12 April 1968
- Launched: 23 October 1969
- Acquired: 1 April 1971
- Commissioned: 10 April 1971
- Decommissioned: 2 July 1992
- Stricken: 11 January 1995
- Motto: "Can Do"
- Fate: Donated to Mexico

Mexico
- Name: Mariano Abasolo
- Namesake: Mariano Abasolo
- Acquired: 29 January 1997
- Commissioned: 23 November 1998
- Identification: Pennant number: F-212
- Fate: Scuttled 35nm E of Tuxpan, Veracruz, Mexico, 27 April 2022.

General characteristics
- Class & type: Knox-class frigate
- Displacement: 3,229 tons (4,210 full load)
- Length: 438 ft (134 m)
- Beam: 46 ft 9 in (14.25 m)
- Draft: 24 ft 9 in (7.54 m)
- Propulsion: 2 × CE 1200psi boilers; 1 Westinghouse geared turbine; 1 shaft, 35,000 shp (26,000 kW)
- Speed: over 27 knots (31 mph; 50 km/h)
- Range: 4,500 nautical miles (8,330 km) at 20 knots (23 mph; 37 km/h)
- Complement: 18 officers, 267 enlisted
- Sensors & processing systems: AN/SPS-40 Air Search Radar; AN/SPS-67 Surface Search Radar; AN/SQS-26 Sonar; AN/SQR-18 Towed array sonar system; Mk68 Gun Fire Control System
- Electronic warfare & decoys: AN/SLQ-32 Electronics Warfare System
- Armament: one Mk-16 8 cell missile launcher for RUR-5 ASROC and Harpoon missiles; one Mk-42 5-inch/54 caliber gun; Mark 46 torpedoes from four single tube launchers); one Mk-25 BPDMS launcher for Sea Sparrow missiles, later replaced by one Phalanx CIWS
- Aircraft carried: one SH-2 Seasprite (LAMPS I) helicopter

USS Marvin Shields (FF-1066) was a Knox-class frigate of the US Navy. The ship was named after the only Seabee to receive the Medal of Honor. CM3 Marvin Glenn Shields was awarded the Medal of Honor during the Vietnam War.

== Construction ==
Marvin Shields was laid down 12 April 1968, by Todd Pacific Shipyards, Seattle, Washington; launched 23 October 1969, and delivered 1 April 1971; cosponsored by Mrs. Victoria Cassalery and Mrs. Richard A. Bennett; commissioned 10 April 1971 by Capt William J. Hunter.

== Design and description ==
The Knox-class design was derived from the Brooke-class frigate modified to extend range and without a long-range missile system. The ships had an overall length of 438 feet (133.5 m), a beam of 47 feet (14.3 m) and a draft of 25 feet (7.6 m). They displaced 4,066 long tons (4,131 t) at full load. Their crew consisted of 13 officers and 211 enlisted men.

The ships were equipped with one Westinghouse geared steam turbine that drove the single propeller shaft. The turbine was designed to produce 35,000 shaft horsepower (26,000 kW), using steam provided by 2 C-E boilers, to reach the designed speed of 27 knots (50 km/h; 31 mph). The Knox class had a range of 4,500 nautical miles (8,300 km; 5,200 mi) at a speed of 20 knots (37 km/h; 23 mph).

The Knox-class ships were armed with a 5"/54 caliber Mark 42 gun forward and a single 3-inch/50-caliber gun aft. They mounted an eight-round RUR-5 ASROC launcher between the 5-inch (127 mm) gun and the bridge. Close-range anti-submarine defense was provided by two twin 12.75-inch (324 mm) Mk 32 torpedo tubes. The ships were equipped with a torpedo-carrying DASH drone helicopter; its telescoping hangar and landing pad were positioned amidships aft of the mack. Beginning in the 1970s, the DASH was replaced by a SH-2 Seasprite LAMPS I helicopter and the hangar and landing deck were accordingly enlarged. Most ships also had the 3-inch (76 mm) gun replaced by an eight-cell BPDMS missile launcher in the early 1970s.

== Service history ==
1983 Deployment

On 20 July 1983, The New York Times reported that the Marvin Shields along with seven other vessels in the Carrier Ranger Battle Group left San Diego on Friday, 15 July 1983, and were headed for the West Pacific when they were rerouted and ordered to steam for Central America to conduct training and flight operations in areas off the coasts of Nicaragua, El Salvador, and Honduras as part of major military exercises planned for that summer.

Besides the Marvin Shields, the battle group was composed of the carrier Ranger, the cruiser Horne, the guided missile destroyer Lynde McCormick, the destroyers Fletcher and Fife, the oiler Wichita, and the support ship Camden.

Marvin Shields was commissioned 10 April 1971, decommissioned 2 July 1992, and struck 11 January 1995. She was subsequently transferred to Mexican Navy and renamed ARM Mariano Abasolo.

The ship was acquired by the Mexican Navy on 29 January 1997 for $7 million and was commissioned 23 November 1998 as ARM Mariano Abasolo (E-51). Redesignated F-212 in 2001.

On 27 April 2022, Abasolo was scuttled 35 nm E of Tuxpan, Veracruz, Mexico at 20°58′5″N 096°43′00″W.
