= Đồng Xoài =

- Ward
- Suối Cam Lake
- Interactive map of Đồng Xoài
- Coordinates: 11°32′7″N 106°51′50″E
- Country: Vietnam
- City: Đồng Nai
- Region: Southeast
- Established: 16 June 2025
- Seat: Khu phố 1

Area
  - Total: 81.32 km^{2} (31.40 sq mi)

Population (31 December 2025)
  - Total: 38,419
  - Density: 472/km^{2} (1,220/sq mi)
- Website: dongxoai.dongnai.gov.vn

Đồng Xoài is a ward in Đồng Nai, Vietnam.

On 16 June 2025:

- The National Assembly of Vietnam adopted Resolution No. 203/2025/QH15, providing for the cessation of district-level administrative units nationwide from 1 July 2025.
- The Standing Committee of the National Assembly of Vietnam adopted Resolution No. 1662/NQ-UBTVQH15 establishing Đồng Xoài ward in Đồng Nai from the entire natural area and population of Tiến Thành ward and Tân Thành commune, formerly in Đồng Xoài city, Bình Phước province.
