= Kahana =

Kahana may refer to:

== People ==
- Abraham Kahana (1874–1946), writer
- Amalia Kahana-Carmon (1926–2019), Israeli author and educator
- Boaz Kahana, American psychologist
- Eliezer Kahana, Jewish preacher and homiletic exegete in Karlin, Belarus
- Eva Kahana, American sociologist
- Jacob ben Abraham Kahana (died 1826), rabbinical author
- Kahana b. Tahlifa, Jewish Talmudist who lived in Babylonia, known as an amora of the third century
- Kalman Kahana (1910–1991), Israeli politician and journalist
- Kim Kahana (1929–2024), American actor, stunt performer, and action choreographer
- Matan Kahana (born 1972), Israeli politician
- Mozes Kahana (1897–1974), writer and revolutionary
- Pesikta de-Rav Kahana, a collection of Aggadic Midrash which exists in two editions
- Rav Kahana II, Jewish Amora sage, active in Babylon and in the Land of Israel
- Rav Kahana IV, Jewish Amora sage of Babylon

== Places ==
=== Hawaii ===
- Ahupua'a O Kahana State Park, formerly Kahana Valley State Park on Oahu
- Kahana Bay and Kahana Bay Beach Park on windward Oahu

=== Pakistan ===
- Kahana, Pakistan, a village in Gujrat District, Pakistan

== Other ==
- ITC Kahana, a typeface
- Kahana, the freighter ship owned by Charles Widmore in the series Lost

== See also ==
- Kahane, a surname
- Kahuna (disambiguation)
