= Naval Mobile Construction Battalion 133 =

United States Navy unit

Naval Mobile Construction Battalion 133 NMCB 133
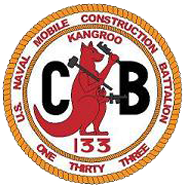
- NMCB 133 insignia
- Active: 17 September 1943 – 1946; 12 August 1966 – present
- Country: United States
- Branch: USN
- Homeport: Construction Battalion Center Gulfport
- Nickname: "Fighting Kangaroos"
- Motto: "We Build We Fight Can Do"
- Engagements: Operation Stalemate II; Iwo Jima; Vietnam War; Operation Provide Comfort; Gulf War; Operation Joint Endeavor; Operation Enduring Freedom; Operation Iraqi Freedom

Commanders
- Current commander: CDR Christopher Archer

Naval Mobile Construction Battalion 133 (NMCB 133) is a United States Navy Construction Battalion, otherwise known as a Seabee battalion, homeported at the Naval Construction Battalion Center (Gulfport, Mississippi). The unit was formed during WWII as the 133rd Naval Construction Battalion. It saw action and was decommissioned shortly after the war ended. The unit was reactivated as Mobile Construction Battalion 133 for the Vietnam War and remains an active unit today.

== History ==
=== WWII – Iwo Jima: 133 Naval Construction Battalion ===
4th Marine Division

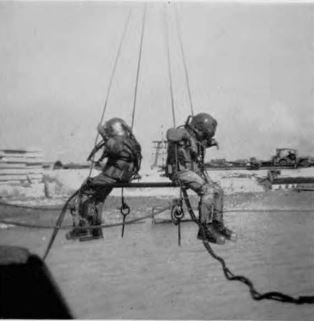
133 Divers preparing to enter water to place pre-cast concrete in a seaplane ramp in Oahu, Hawaii

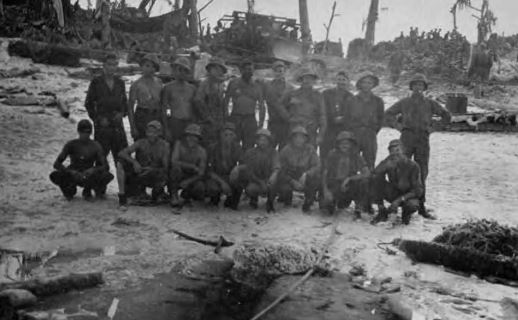
CB 133's Peleliu pontoon detail was the first group to be in combat. They had one pontoon assembly that had to be extracted from a heavily mined area under fire

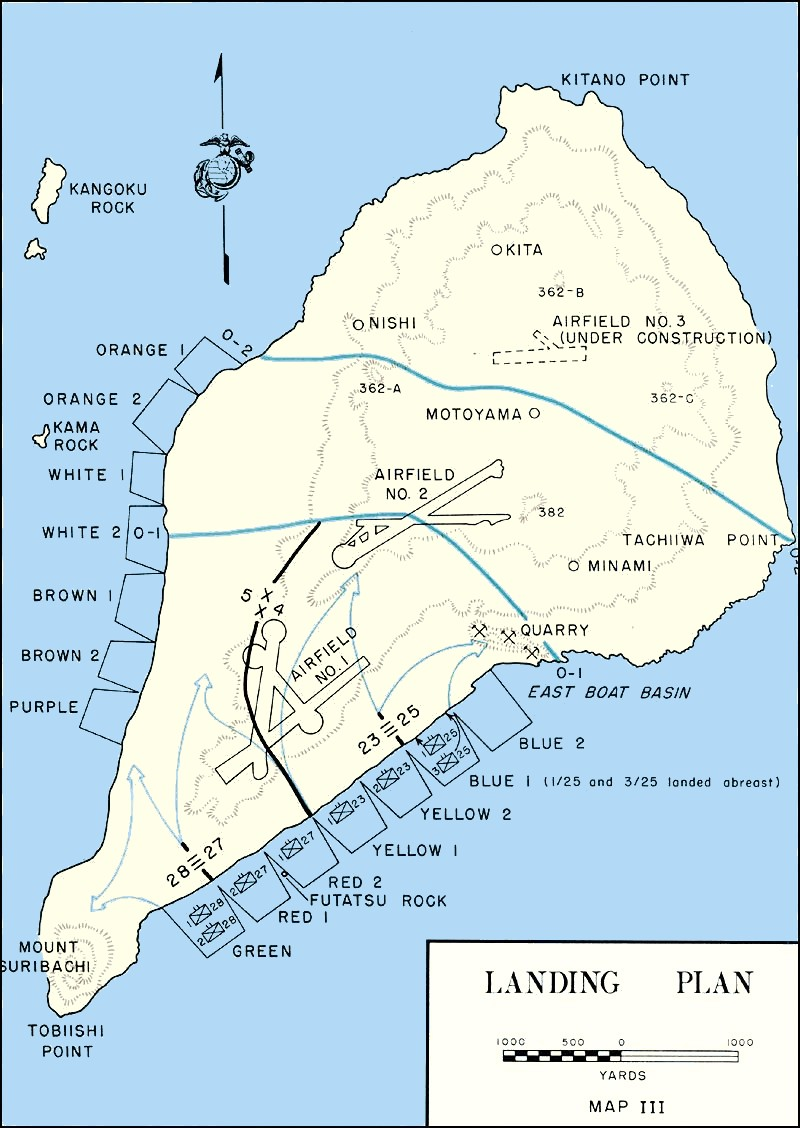
Blue lines indicate anticipated USMC advance with O-1 (Objective day#1)

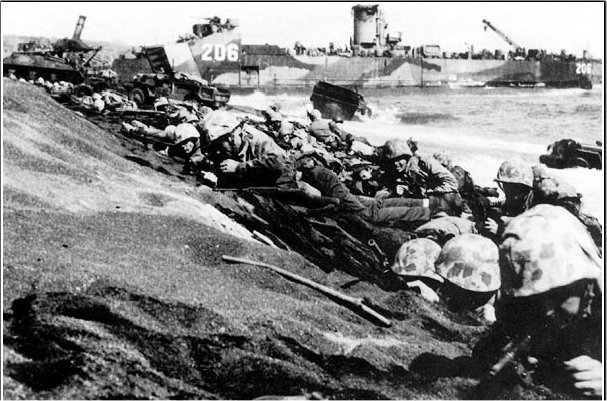
LSM 206 loaded with A Co 133's Shore Party equipment & 3 D8s at approx. 0935 were landed on Red Beach 2 instead of yellow 1

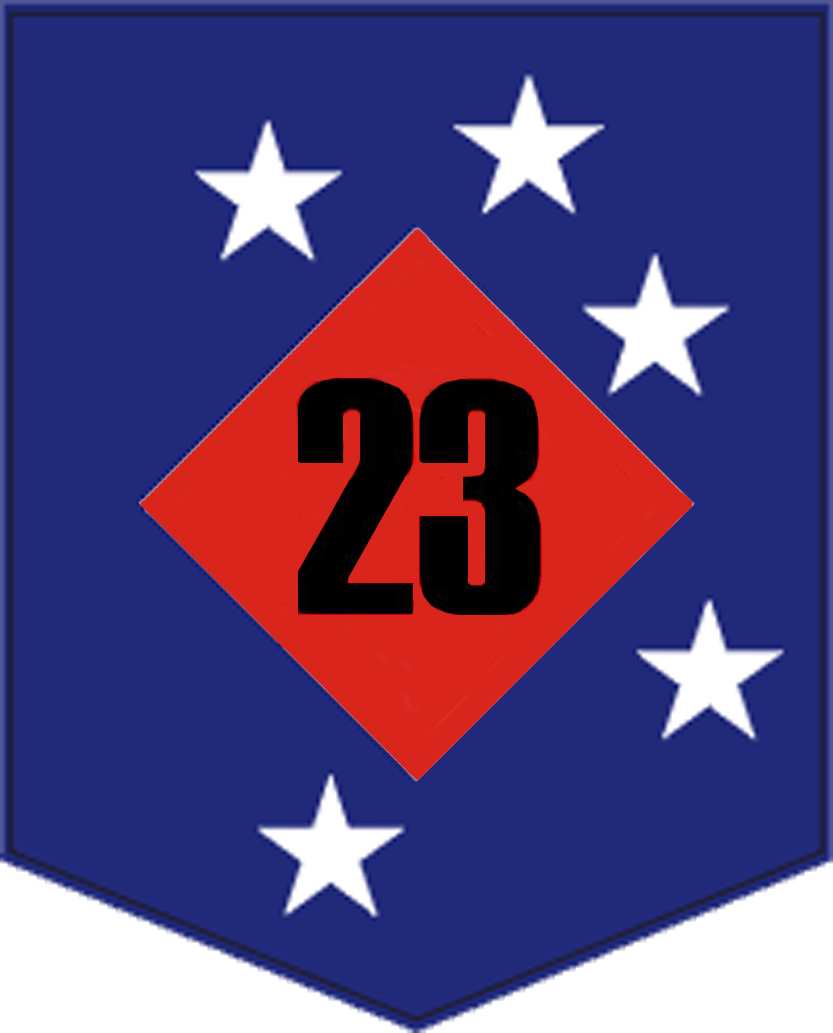
23rd Marine Regiment

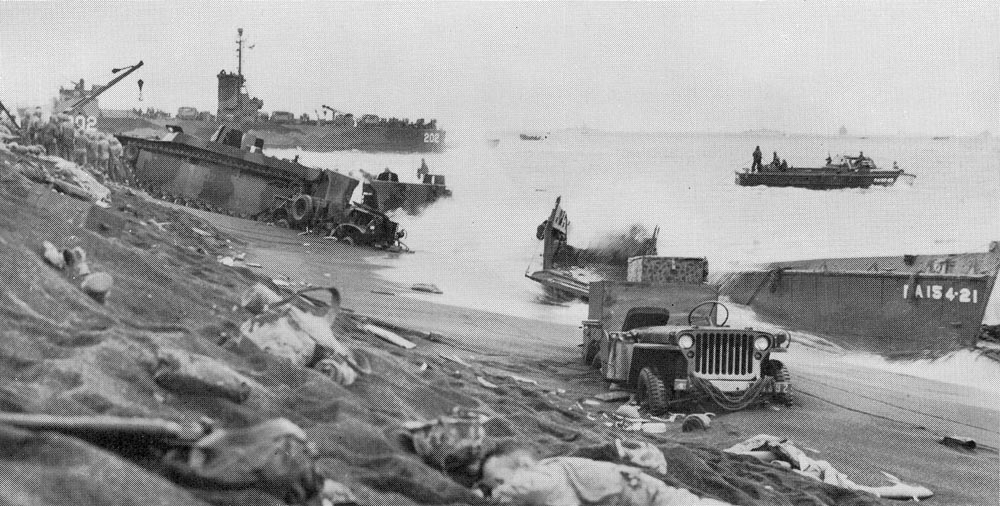
LSM 202 landed B Co 133's Shore Party equipment and D8s. Shore Party on left.

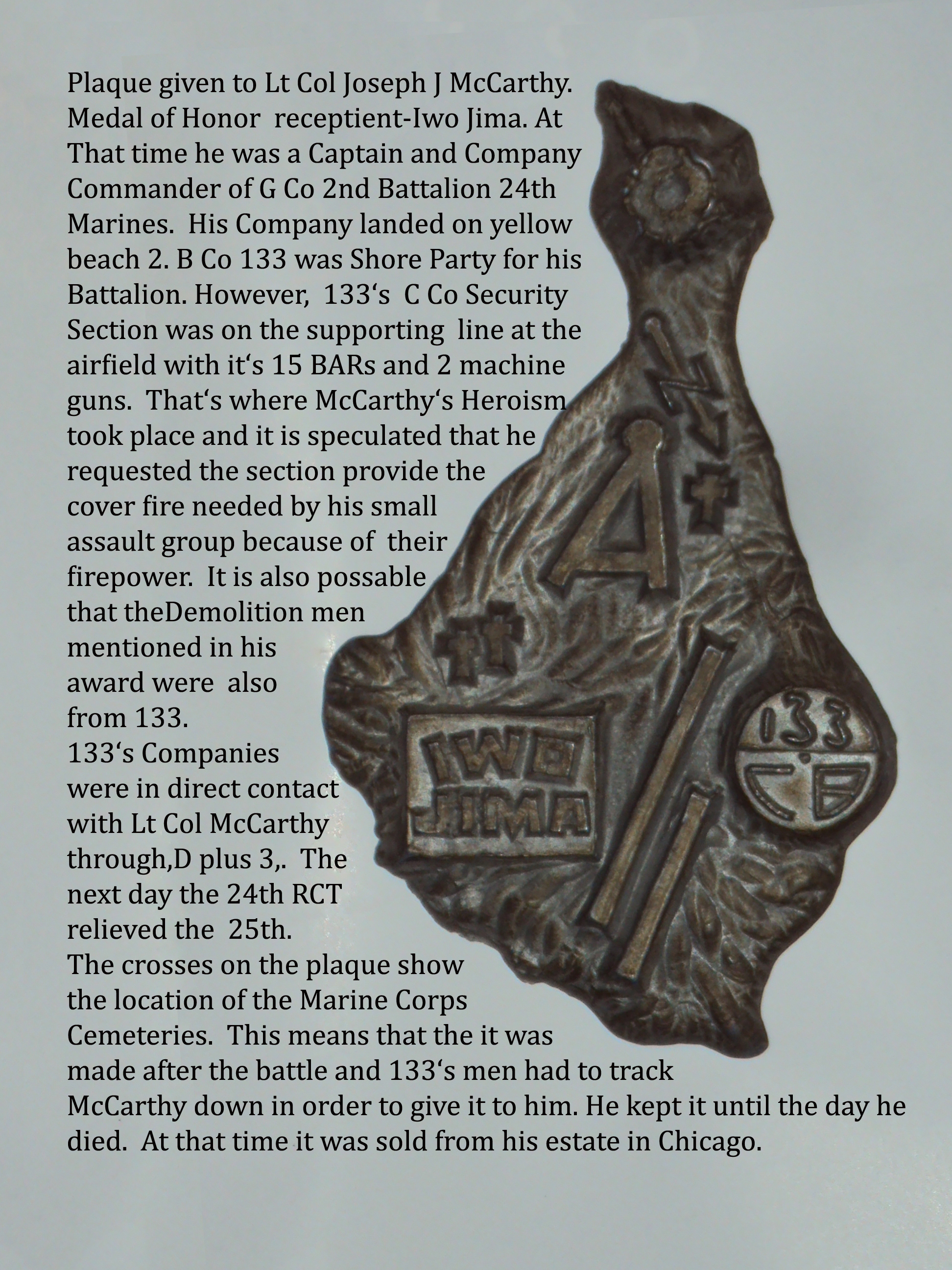
133 Plaque from the estate of Lt Col Joseph J. McCarthy in zinc.

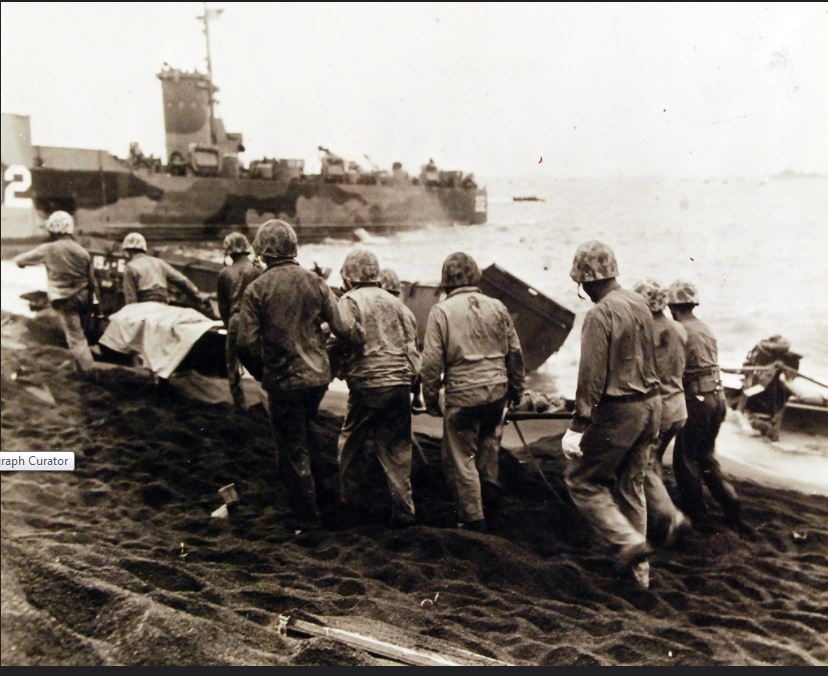
LSM 202, B Co 133 evacuating wounded

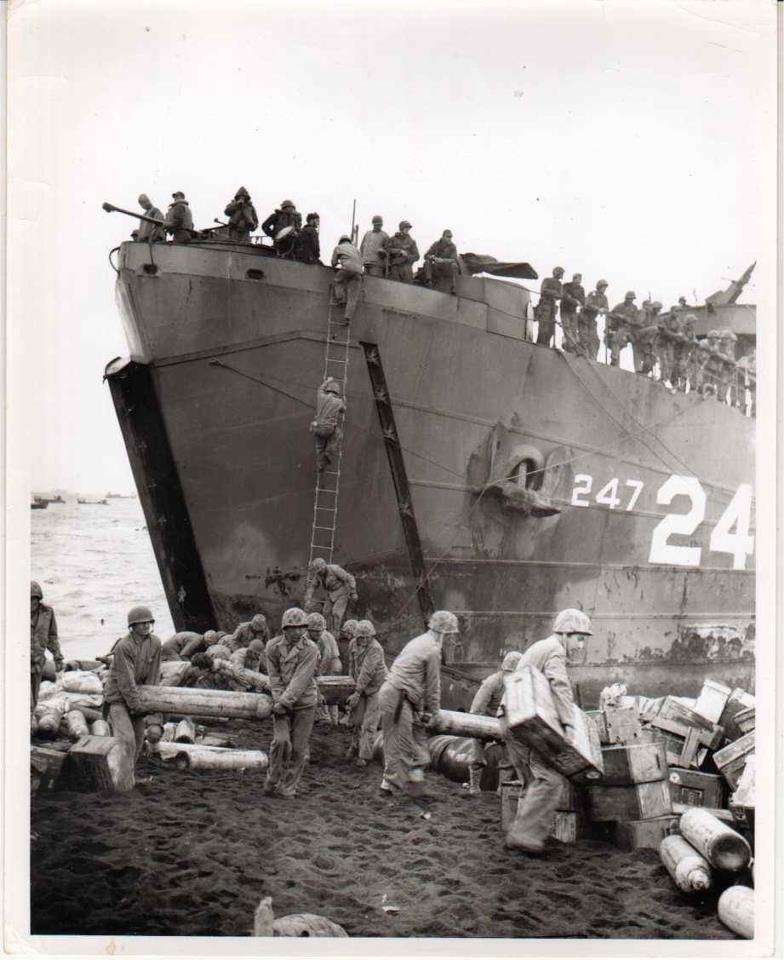
Seabee Shore Party of the 23rd Marines unload LST 247 on yellow beach

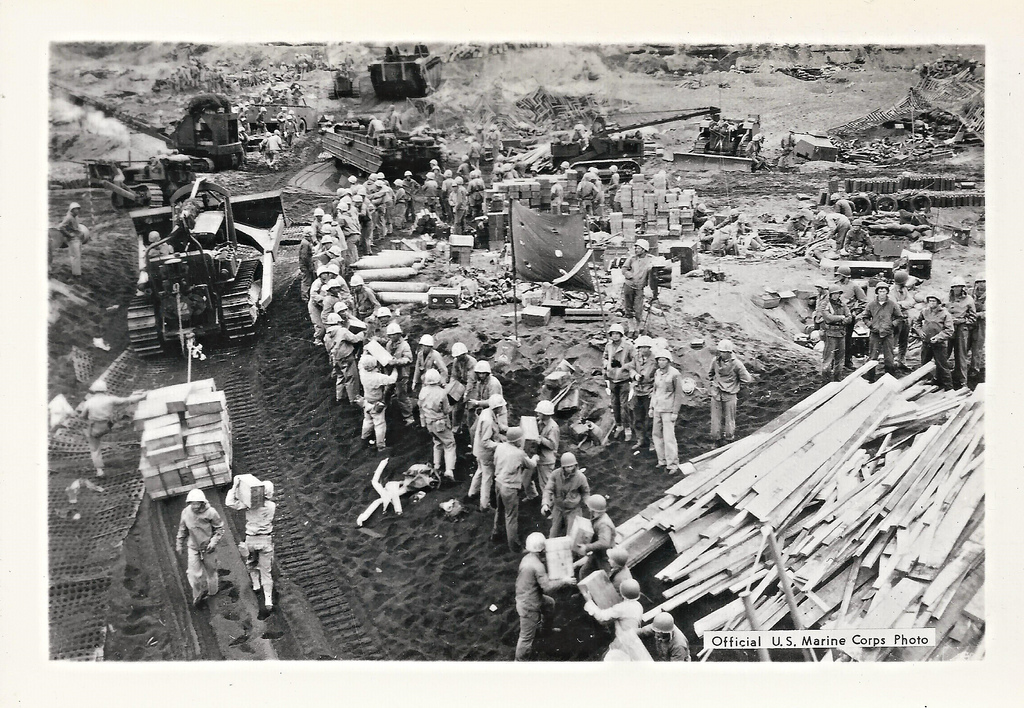
Seabee D8 & Shore Party. note: the flag (center) indicating beach color.

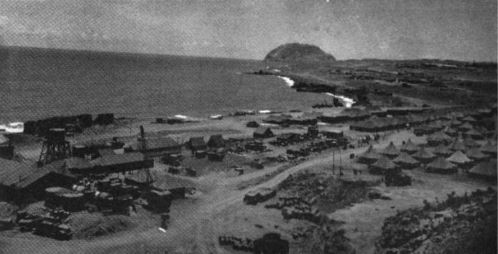
133 was able to move out of foxholes and into its camp on D+42 with Mount Suribachi to the south.

The unit's history began on 17 September 1943 at Camp Peary, Virginia, where it was commissioned as the 133rd Naval Construction Battalion (NCB). After 7 months of training at Davisville, Gulfport and Port Hueneme the battalion's first overseas assignment was NAS Honolulu, Territory of Hawaii (May–October 1944). While there, the battalion's demolitions men were tasked with scuttling the USS Baltimore (C-3) 15 miles offshore. The battalion created a concrete pre-cast yard that became the sole supplier of pre-cast for all the battalions and was one of the busiest places on the island. In July the battalion sent a small pontoon detachment to take part in the Battle of Peleliu. Some of the men came under heavy mortar fire evacuating U.S. Army troops at one point. On 15 October 1944 word was received that the battalion was going to be attached to the 4th Marine Division. On 30 October the assignment came for Operation Detachment at Iwo Jima. D-day was planned for 19 February 1945. When 133 was attached to the 4th it was filling a billet that had been vacated when the 121st CB was released by the Marine Corps. The 121st CB had been transferred to the Marine Corps and re-designated as the 3rd Battalion of the 20th Marine Regiment. After the assault of Tinian the 20th Marines were inactivated. Then both the 1st battalion (4th Engineers) and 2nd battalion (4th Pioneers) were placed under Divisional control. Third battalion 3/20 or the 121st, was returned to the Navy creating the vacancy 133 was posted to. Before joining the 4th at Camp Maui, the 133rd was put through the Army's Pacific Jungle Combat Training Center (CTC) at Punaluu and Kahana Valleys on the North Shore of Oahu, TH. It was a unit level training center to supplement Army Ranger and Army Combat training Schools. Camp Maui was located nearby at Haiku-Pauwela. The 133rd was the first unit to complete the course without a casualty, according to their cruise book.

Once assigned to the division the battalion had each company "tasked" to a different element of the 23rd Marines for shore party training. The battalion's (sp) assignment was to provide the beach support required by the forward lines of the 23rd, 24th, and 25th Marines. The division shipped out for Island "X" on 31 December with V Amphibious Corps (VAC) as T.U. 56.2.2 of Baker Landing Group. Baker group was commanded by Major General C.B. Cates(USMC) 4th Marine Division. When they were a few days out the men learned they were heading to a place they had never heard of called Iwo Jima. The assault for Iwo was based upon Tinian where the 2nd and 4th Marine Divisions assault had been "reinforced" by Marine Engineering Regiments with the 18th and 121st CBs as 3rd battalions of the 18th and 20th Marines. On D+3 the Jap airfield was secured and the Seabees had it operational in a few hours.(the Iwo Jima landing map is notated that the Marine Corps planned to have control of Iwo Jima in 3 days also) For Iwo, the 4th and 5th Marine Divisions were "reinforced" by the 133rd and 31st CBs. Marine Corps landing maps indicate that for O-1 (objective Day 1) Motoyama Airfield No. 1 would be secured with the 133rd tasked to get it operational. However, D+5 the assignment was given to the 31st CB due to the losses 133 had suffered. The next day the 62nd CB from V Corps, landed with the 3rd Marine Division and was designated the lead Battalion for Airfield No. 1. The 31st was assigned Airfield No. 2 and the 133rd was given Airfield No. 3. In just seven days the heavy equipment of the 3 combined battalions had Airfield No. 1 operational.

The 133rd CB and the 4th Marine Pioneer Battalion were the primary units of the "Assault" shore parties for the 23rd and 25th Regimental Combat Teams (RCT) on the 4th Marine Division's yellow and blue beaches. The 4th Marine Division's single Pioneer Battalion was assigned to the 25th RCT. USMC tactical operations required another Pioneer battalion for the 23rd RCT's Assault. The 121st CB had been tasked as such at Roi-Namur, Siapan, and Tinian so giving that task to the 133rd was simply standard 4th Marine Division operations. Tasking Seabees for USMC shore party at Iwo was a fortuitous decision for the Corps. The CBs brought organic elements the Marines did not have, specifically, bulldozers with winches and D8s 132–148 Hp compared to the Marine Corp's TD 18s 72–80 Hp. Afterwards, the after action reports recommended all USMC bulldozers be equipped with winches as they had none. The history is, that "on the beach at Iwo, bulldozers proved to be worth their weights in Gold" and the CBs had the biggest and the best the Navy could provide. The entire 1st Battalion 24th Marines (1/24) replacement draft that was attached to the 133rd.

The Landing Force Shore Party Commander was OIC of the 8th Marine Field Depot. The 8th Field Depot assigned a squad to liaison with each shore party by beach color. Each shore party had Marine JASCO (Joint Assault Communications Co) men attached as well as personnel from the 442nd U.S. Army Port Company.

Hq Co was posted to the 23rd Marines support group and was the Hq for yellow beaches 1 and 2. They came ashore at 1445 from the APA 196 – USS Logan. The company had two 30 man infantry security sections plus two 30 cal. machine guns on the beach defense parameter until their ratings were needed. The medics had one Dr. MIA another Dr., the Dentist and six corpsmen were made casualties by a single shell. Even so, 133's corpsman established an evacuation station on blue 1. Also with Hq Co. was a 32-man team from the 8th Marine Depot Company to manage the depots on yellow beaches.

- On D+2 yellow beach was closed to landing craft due to all the destroyed or inoperable equipment along the water's edge. UDT 14 was assigned to beaches yellow 1 and 2 and was ordered back ashore to get the waters edge clear for landing craft to continue the assault. By the afternoon of D+2 half of the 28 CEC on the beach had been killed, wounded or evacuated. On blue 100% of the corpsmen were casualties. On D+4 the 133rd and UDTs were working together to get it done.

A Co was the major component of the shore party posted to 1st Battalion 23rd Marines or 1/23 which was the left "Assault" battalion for yellow beach. D-day they landed a 0935 on yellow beach 1 from APA 158 – USS Newberry and LSM 206. A Co 4th Pioneers was split in two to share their combat experience/knowledge and was attached to A Co 133. One of A Co's security sections (30 men) landed in 4 LCVPs with one 7-man gun crew and 37mm Gun M3 in each craft. One LCVP took a direct hit killing the entire gun crew. 133's gun crews were immediately tasked with supporting the assault. A Co's other security section landed on the heels of the first wave and were the first Seabees to set foot on Iwo Jima. The battalion cruise book states the security section was sent to the front line until their skills were needed on the beach. The USN beach party from the USS Newberry served A Co. Also with A Co was a 32-man beach team from the 8th Marine Depot Company as well as A Co. 24th Marines replacement draft (1/24).

- 1/23 was so decimated that 3/23 relieved them from the line by evening of D-day. D+3 the entire 23rd was in such a bad way that it was placed in Corps Reserve, replaced by the 21st RCT from the 3rd Marines. At that time 133's Shore Parties were consolidated on yellow 1 while the 3rd Pioneers landed on yellow 2 for the 21st until D+6. On D+5 the 133rd was given priority status to unload its equipment on yellow and establish a dump to store it.

B Co was the major component of the shore party posted to 2nd Battalion 23rd Marines or 2/23 which was the right "Assault" battalion for yellow beach. They also landed at 0935, but on blue 2 from the APA 207 – USS Mifflin and LSM-202. That beach had a Homophone "Blew to" Hell beach. Mortar fire was so heavy they could not move to yellow 2, but were ordered to because, the situation became critical for the 4th Pioneers that had made it to y2. A Co. 4th Pioneers was split in two to share their combat experience/knowledge and was attached to B Co 133. On D+1 LSM-202 landed 3 D8s and a crane for B Co. B Co's security sections landed the same as A Co and also went forward until needed. The USN beach party from the USS Mifflin was assigned to serve with B Co. Also with B Co was a 32-man beach team from the 8th Marine Depot Company as well as B Co 24th Marines replacement draft. On D+1 the acting Shore Party commander on beach yellow 2 was wounded and command transferred to B Co. Commander 133.

- On D-day 133 had demolitions men blasting broached landing craft and the beachmaster put in a request for UDT assistance.

C Co was posted to the 3rd Battalion 23rd Marines shore Parties moved to black beach (which was created from the right half of beach red 2 and the left half of yellow 1). A 43-man beach party from the USS Lowndes served with C Co as did C Co. 24th Marines replacement draft.

- CB security sections were composed of heavy weapons. They varied a little in size and weapons, but numbered about 40 men with two 30 cal. or 50 cal. machine guns, and 15 two man BAR teams. When available Seabees favored the Thompson seen in the Seabee logo.

D Co was posted to the 4th Pioneer Battalion's reserve. The 25th Marines lists them as the shore party reserve. The 4th Marine Div. Operations Report has them on APA 190 the USS Pickens. The 25th had just 2 LSMs assigned to the Shore Party so D Co's equipment would have been on LSTs. They landed at 1600 on beach blue 2. The record says some were "tactically disposed" without identifying them as the security section and the balance were told to dig in. Of the assault beaches blue was the worst. It was overlooked by an adjacent quarry whose walls were honeycombed with tunnels. The pre-assault bombardment had left them intact costing the 25th Marines and D Co. many casualties.

The Unit Histories of both the 4th and 5th Marine Divisions state that the conditions on the beach for the (Red Patch) Shore Parties and the (yellow patch) USN Beach Parties were worse than the front lines. D-day all personnel were initially employed to aid the evacuation of casualties. From D-day until D+5 the men were on duty 24 hrs a day. To get sleep men would go up to the front lines where it was safer. D+5 to D+8 work was 4 hrs on 4 hrs off. From D+8 to D+14 work was 4 hrs on 8 hrs off. On D+14 it changed to straight 8 hr shifts. The corpsman, security sections, equipment operators and truck drivers were on call at all times, from the beginning to the end of the assault. On D+18 (9 March) 133's Companies were relieved by the Army Garrison Shore Party. The battalion reorganized and returned to the Navy.

The battle for Iwo Jima took 26 days. In that time 133 suffered 328 casualties, with 3 officers and 39 enlisted KIA and 2 MIA. It was the price paid for being ordered into USMC fatigues and landing battalion strength in an assault tasked as a USMC Pioneer Battalion. Their losses were the most any Seabee unit has ever suffered. The battalion was awarded the Navy Unit Commendation the same as the other 3 shore party battalions: 4th Marine Pioneers, 5th Marine Pioneers and 31st CB. However, the unit is not listed as tasked in the NUC Section of the Iwo Jima awards. It should read as the 23rd Marines described in their Ops report: "133rd CB (less Companies A, B, C, and D)". This is how the 4th and 5th Pioneer Battalions were listed. Had A, B, C and D Companies been listed the same, they also would appear in the PUC section for being assigned to their respective "assault" battalions 1/23, 2/23, 3/23 and 2/25. exactly as the Pioneer Companies were for their PUC's. The 4th Marine Division did not follow protocol and put the entire Battalion up for the PUC. The 4th Marine Division's 1st Endorsement letter dated 17 September 1945 has the entire Battalion listed for the PUC. All four shore party battalions were designated "support" so the battalion was automatically rejected. It was the individual companies that were tasked as "assault". In October the 1st Endorsement Letter was changed by the recommendation that the battalion be dropped from the PUC while A, B, C Companies were then listed in the "assault troops" column for PUCs.

The USMC ground commanders felt every man that set foot on the island during the assault should get a Presidential Unit Citation or PUC. The USMC awards people said that would diminish the status of the PUC, but after a year had not completed the unit awards. At which point Marine Commandant Gen. Vandergrift went to Navy Secretary Forrestal with the idea that the PUC be given to units designated "assault" units and the NUC to those designated "support" prior to the landing. Forrestal agreed, but he had to remove the words "and all those attached to or serving with" from the PUC to make it work. The PUC was created by Executive Order 9050. It takes another Executive Order to change an existing Executive Order and there is no authorization in the record for removing the words changing award protocol. Fox Annex to the 4th Marine Division's Operations Report, of April 1945, shows 133's Companies individually tasked to "assault" infantry battalions. The removal of the line "and all those attached to or serving with" from the PUC document cost A, B. C. and D companies each that award. H Company was not attached to an assault battalion, but rather a regiment. 133 Hq was entitled to the same award the 23rd Regiment received, for being "attached to and serving with" the Regiment despite the "support" designation.

In addition to 328 Purple Hearts, 133's men received 10 Bronze Stars and 29 Marine Corps Commendations. Before that happened the battalion crushed over 100,000 tons of volcanic rock, moved over 1 million cubic yards of volcanic soil, laid 5,800 feet of sewer line, installed 4,000 feet of electrical conduit and poured 725 cubic yards of concrete. 133 graded the site and built the entrances for both the 3rd Marine Division and the 4th Marine Division at the cemetery on Iwo.

On Iwo Jima 133 had 281 equipment operators working 2 ten hour shifts. Besides being tasked with construction of airfield No.3 the battalion set up a hotmix asphalt plant. 133 equipment operators laid the longest runway in the Pacific, 1.86 miles long x 200'. By VJ-day they had laid the equivalent of 55 miles of 2 lane highway.

USN WWII phonetic alphabet used to identify individual Companies: A = Able, B = Baker, C = Charlie, D = Dog

- Annex Fox to the 4th Marine Division's Ops Report states that the Navy did not relinquish operational control of the USN beach parties to the USMC shore parties.
- Postwar NAS Honolulu eventually became Honolulu International Airport.
- LSM Division 27

=== USMC commendatory Iwo Jima observations ===
- Capt. Jesse L. Massey, Quartermaster 8th Marine field depot. "No words of tribute can express what those boys did. Nothing I could say would be adequate. They were brave resourceful enough to carry out a difficult assignment under the most hazardous conditions."
- Warrant Gunner Carl H. Gerlach Ord. Company 4th Marine Div. "I saw Seabees of the 133rd carry ammo to marines on the front lines until we could set up a dump behind the lines. I understand they were under fire for the first time. The work I saw done by members of the battalion was as fine an example of Seabee "Can Do" as will ever be turned in by any outfit."
- Col. Shelton Scales Commander 3rd Bn 23rd Marines recommended 133 for the PUC. His statements were documented in an interview with LtCol. Oliver North for War Stories.
- Lt. General Snowden USMC (commanded Company I, 3rd Battalion, 23rd Marines) recommended 133 for the PUC to the Board for Correction of the Naval Record.

On 28 September 1945 the 9th Construction Brigade informed 8, 31, and 133 NCBs that they were detached from the 41st Construction Regiment on Iwo Jima and would act independently until reassigned. In October some of 133's men went with the 31st CB to Sasebo, Japan for the occupation reconstruction (and were discharged at Bremerton Naval Yard, in Washington state January 1946). In late November 1945 the 133rd was moved to Guam. On 1 December, it took over the work orders of the decommissioned 25th CB. The same fate awaited the 133rd later that month on the 27th due to the reduced need for the existing Naval Construction force.

=== Disney Insignia and unit nickname ===
The 133rd that landed on Iwo Jima had an insignia drawn by Hank Porter at the Walt Disney Studios Insignia Department. Porter was Disney's top insignia designer. Carpenter Second class Jack E. Dorn – 3rd platoon D Co. sent a request to the Disney Studios on 9 December 1944 from Camp Maui, TH. The Studios received it on 26 December and sent the completed design in June 1945. The battalion received Porter's drawing on Iwo Jima. That insignia was of a Seabee walking, carrying a hammer and monkey wrench while chewing his oats. It takes up an entire page in the battalion's cruise book. "Rain-Makers" was the moniker the battalion used as it was felt it rained everywhere they went. "Rained-how it Rained" is the description used in one 4th Marine Division narrative of Camp Maui living conditions. On Iwo Jima it rained on D+2. The battalion used "Rain-Makers" as the cover title of the unit cruise-book, published in 1946.

=== Vietnam, MCB 133 ===
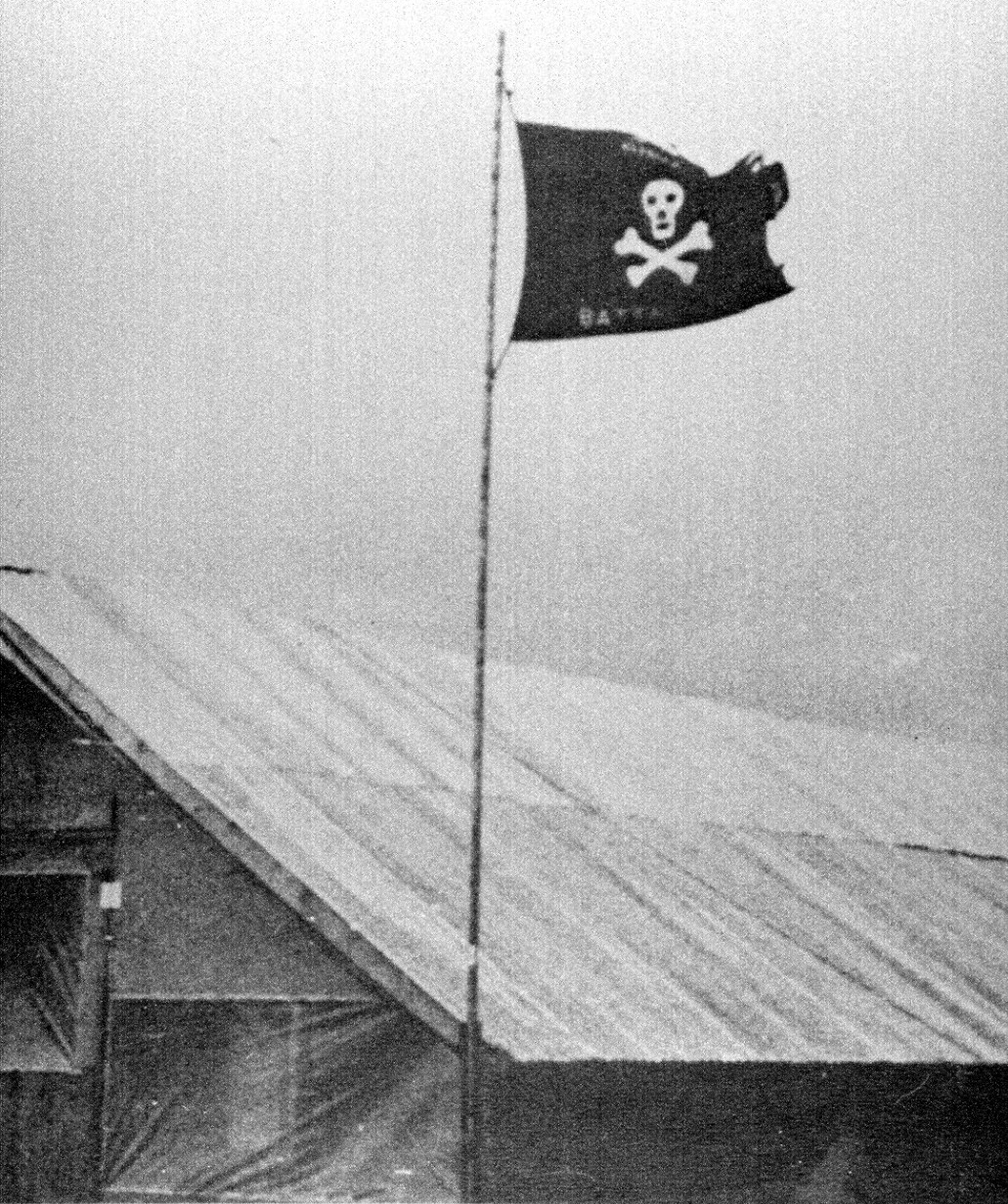
Ghost Battalion colors at Quang Tri. The Seabees had 11,000 graves to move in order to construct that airfield.

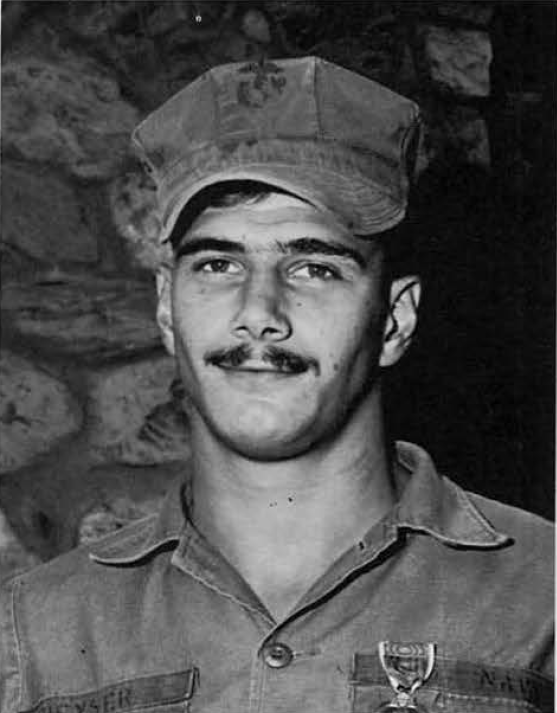
SN Heyser: NMCB 133's first Purple Heart of 1968 deployment: note the cover

The battalion was reactivated 12 August 1966 in Gulfport, Mississippi, as a Mobile Construction Battalion. It seems the battalion did not have a copy of the unit History from WWII with the Disney insignia and there was a belief that the battalion's first deployment was supposed to have been Australia. This belief produced the Kangaroo insignia and the slogan "Kangaroo Can Do".(most CBs created a new insignia when they were recommissioned) After completion of training in Gulfport and Camp Lejeune they deployed to Đà Nẵng East, Vietnam. The battalion was awarded its second Navy Unit Commendation for that tour. The second deployment to Nam took them to Phu Bai Combat Base. This time they had a huge project laying 10,000 sheets on matting at that airfield. During this deployment an urgent airfield was needed at Quảng Trị. The project was designated "top secret", site "X", and to be completed in under 45 days. MCBs 1, 3, 4, 7, 10, 11, 74, 121, and 133 all sent detachments of men and equipment to get the job done. Those detachments dubbed themselves the Ghost Battalion and chose the Jolly Roger for the battalion's colors. The Ghost Battalion was relieved by NMCB 10 and disbanded 1 November 1967. A "High Priority" in 1968 was roadwork on Route 1, the length of Vietnam. In addition to NMCB 133, CBs 1, 4, 7, 8, 11, 53, 58, 62, 71, 74, and 138 all worked concurrently on it. In 1969 the third deployment was to Camp Wilkinson, at Gia Le, 6 miles southeast of Hue. A large project that time was the repair of the 286-foot center span of the main highway bridge damaged during the Tet Offensive. The battalion, along with NMCB 128, provided material support to NMCBs 1 and 11 while they repaired the bridge at Bau Phu on Route 1. At Phu Bai Combat Base MCB 1 had a crew assisting 133 laying asphalt there.

- In 1968 military training was 2 weeks in Gulfport and 4 weeks at Camp Lejuene
- In March 1968 men of MCB 121 took possession of an abandoned non-operational M24 Chaffee tank. When 133 relieved the 121st the M-24 became theirs.
- In 1968 the Marine Corps requested that the Navy change its use of "MCB" for Mobile Construction Battalion as the Marine Corps were using "MCB" for "Marine Combat Base". The dual usage was creating confusion in Vietnam. The Navy agreed there was an issue and changed the Navy's CB name format. The USN from "United States Naval" Mobile Construction Battalions was changed to U.S. and the N was moved to the "MCB" creating the "NMCB" used by 133 currently.
- On 18 August 1969, just two months after the battalion deployed, Hurricane Camille made landfall 20 miles west of CBC Gulfport at Waveland, MS. It would be another 5 months before the men could get home to help their families recover.
- In 1969 the battalion had two Seabee Teams 13303 and 13304

In 1970 the battalion did a tour where the sun never set on it. It deployed to Okinawa with detachments to: Guam, Biên Hòa Air Base, Vietnam, Azores and the Aleutians. This was followed by a deployment of firsts. They were the first Atlantic fleet Battalion to serve as the alert Battalion for the Pacific Fleet. From Okinawa they had detachments to Iwakuni, Japan, Oahu, Hawaii, Biên Hòa, Vietnam and Subic Bay, P.I. 1970 was the transitional year for Seabee involvement in Vietnam. From then on their deployed strength was drawn down and 133 did not deploy there again.

- NMCB 133 Cruise-books 1967–1977
- Commander Naval Construction Battalion U.S. Pacific Fleet, Tân Sơn Nhất, Republic of Vietnam, Completion Report 1963–1972. Seabee Teams

During the 1973 Okinawa Deployment, the battalion lost two Officers in an ambush in the Philippines to unknown assailants. Commanding Officer Cdr. L.R. Dobler and Lt. Jefferies PI OIC. Also killed was Capt. T. Mitchell Commander 30th NCR (Naval Construction Regiment). Also during that deployment Camp Shields was hit by Category II Typhoon Iris.

=== Iraq ===
In March 1991 the battalion deployed to Spain. On 1 April it was ordered to send its AirDet to Zakho, Iraq. Three weeks later orders came to recall all detachments. The battalion had been tasked as a component of Operation Provide Comfort and was to move forward to link up with the AirDet. This took the battalion to Zakho assigned to the Army's 18th Engineer Brigade. When 133 mounted out of Rota its equipment was sent by sea to Iskenderum, Turkey. From there it was convoyed 400 miles to Zakho. NMCB 133's base was established in a walled compound called Camp Sommers along with the headquarters of the 24th Marine Expeditionary Unit (MEU) and the 18th Engineer Brigade. Operation Provide Comfort had two Joint Task Forces with JTF Bravo headed by the 24th MEU. Due to the amount of work they were tasked with, the battalion went to 12-hour days. It was an emergency service relief effort that originally was thought would take 3 months. However, due to the large number of Kurds returning home from the refugee-displaced person camps, 133 was able leave after 8 weeks.

=== Bosnia ===
December 1995 into 1996, in support of the Implementation Force (IFOR) code named Operation Joint Endeavour an Air Det Heavy of 170 men deployed to the Sava River crossing at Zupanja, Croatia. There they constructed the first and very urgently needed displaced persons tent camp of the Implementation Force. Renovation of the NATO Commander's facilities in Sarajevo was one project. Detail Juliet Echo was assigned the construction of camps for the US Army's 16th Corps Support Group in Croatia and the 1st Armored Division's ready 1st Combat Team in Bosnia.

1997 Korean Air Lines flight 801 crashed in the jungles of Guam and 133 helped get ground access to the site.

In March 1998 the battalion sent a Det of 217 men back to Bosnia to build SEAHuts and do bridge repair work.

=== Iraq/Afghanistan ===
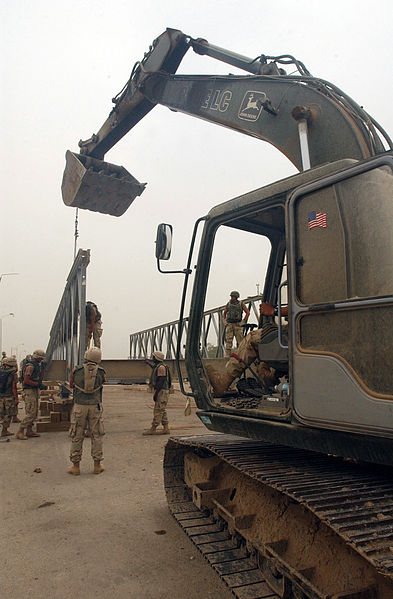
133 rebuilds Sarabadi Bridge in 2003 near Hillah, Iraq

On 28 November 2001 the first members of NMCB 133 arrived at Camp Rhino, Afghanistan as part of Operation Enduring Freedom.

During this deployment it was decided to make Camp X-Ray operational again and 133 sent the battalion's detail at Roosevelt Roads to Guantanamo Bay to make it happen.

January and February 2003 saw the battalion deployed in support of the 1st Marine Expeditionary Force operationally assigned to the 1st MEF Engineer Group. In Southern Iraq the battalion created a POW facility for 14,000, provided defense for 2 bridges and maintenance to the main supply routes as part of Task Force Charlie. Task Force Charlie was made up of NMCB-4, NMCB-74, NMCB-133, CBMU-303 and SU-2 and had a base in Kuwait, Camp Moreell. The men also assembled the largest pontoon bridge since WWII, at Zubadiyah, North of Al Kut, on the Tigris. Another bridge they worked on was the Sarabadi, near Hillah, where they used a Mabey-Johnson Bridge to repair the existing damaged one. The battalion lost a man to a non-combat explosion there from unexploded ordnance. In addition, the battalion completed 60 major Civil Action Projects in Kuwait and Iraq. The unit was active in both Operation Enduring Freedom and Operation Iraqi Freedom.

=== 2005–present ===
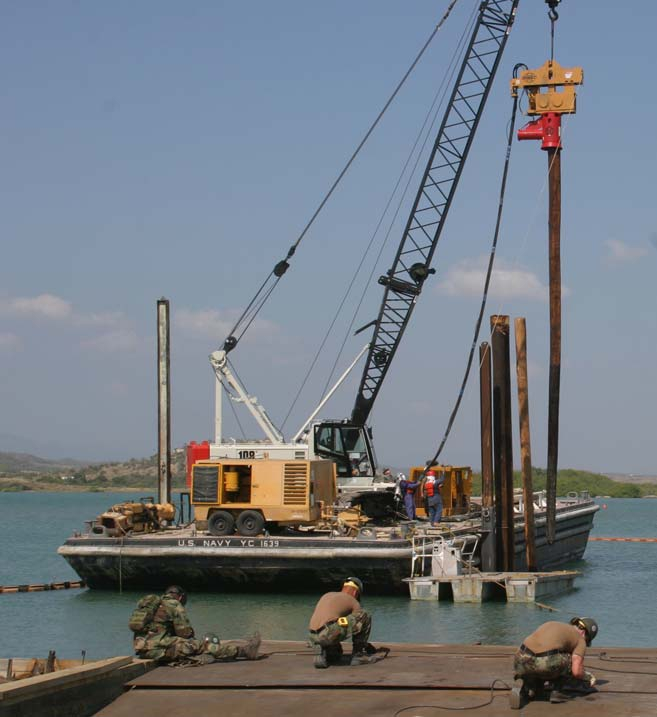
Det Gitmo 2007 building a temporary ferry pier on the Leeward side

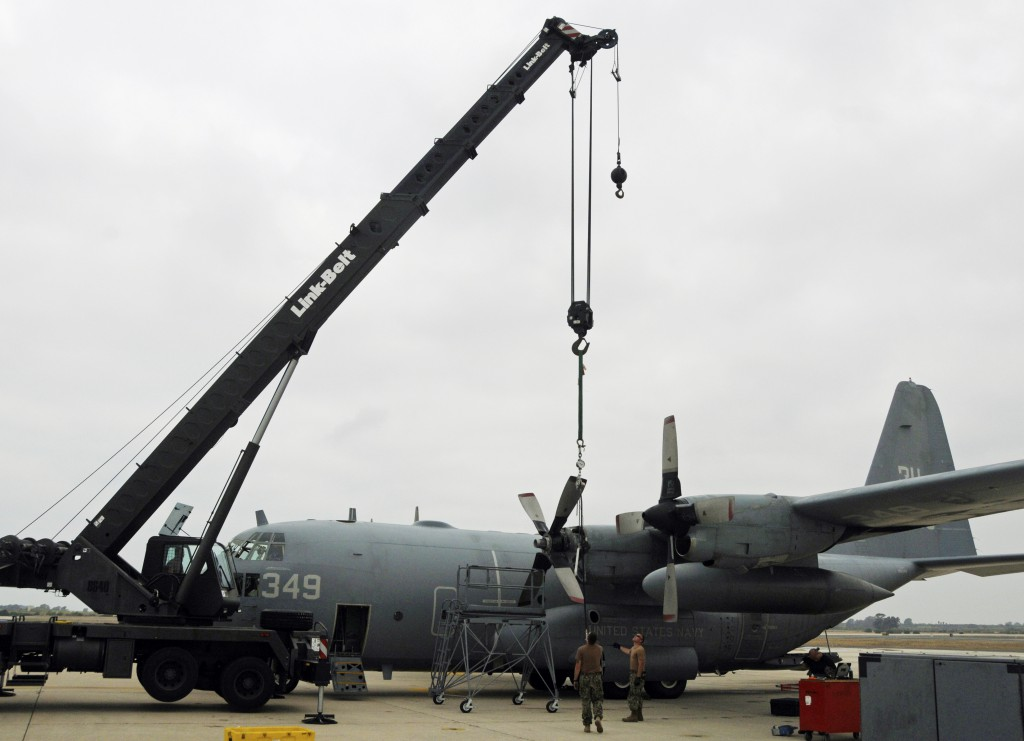
NMCB 133 Supports C-130 Aircraft Repair in Rota 2014 for Fleet Logistics Sqd. 62

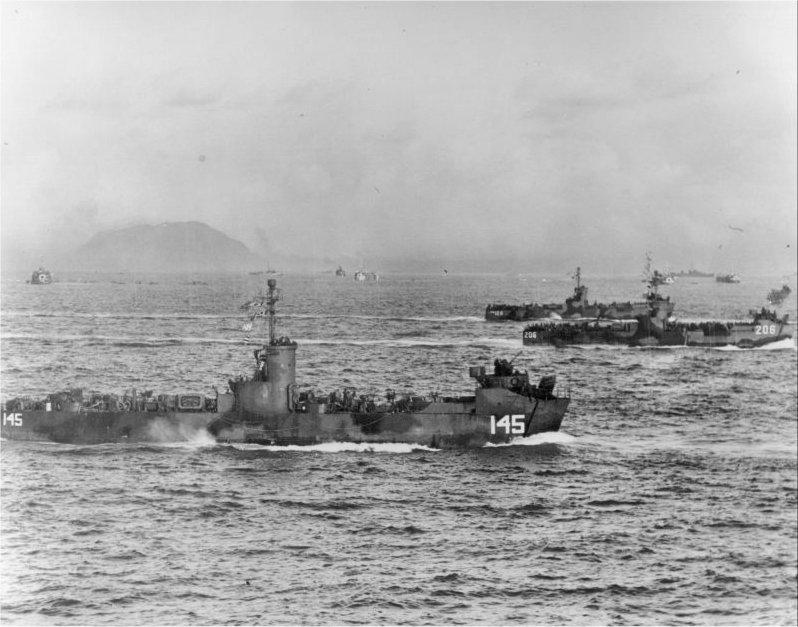
LSMs 145 and 206 D-day with 133's Shore Party Equipment for C Co. & A Co.

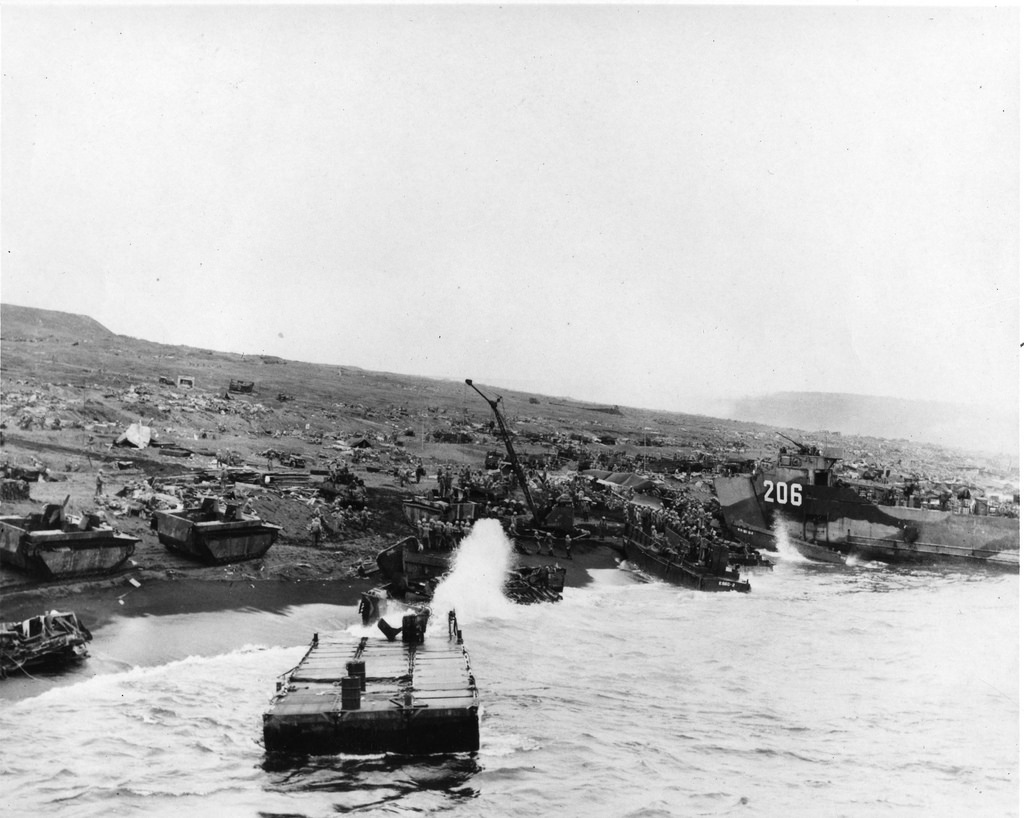
yellow beach 1, LSM 206 and 23rd Marines Shore Party A Co 133rd NCB. Crane is loading one LVT for run to the front while 2 more wait.

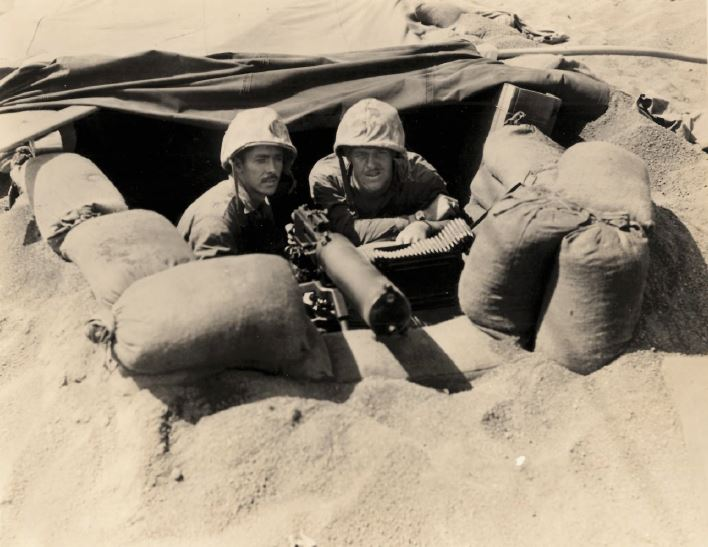
CINCPAC 5398, official USN press release: Hq Co. security section gun crew. Two of 133's ships cooks on the defense parameter of yellow beach.

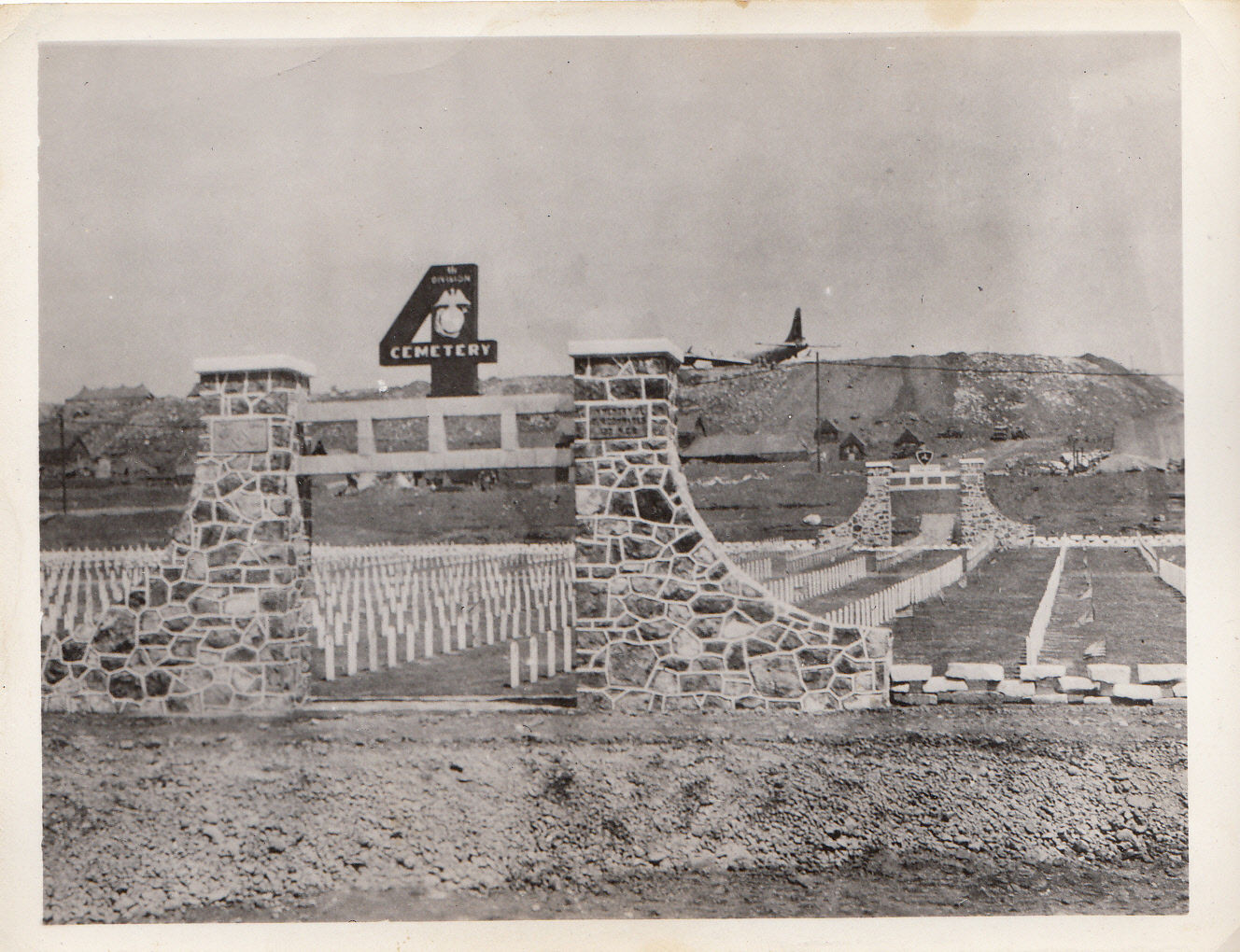
4th Marine Corps Iwo Jima Cemetery Entrance with built by 133 NCB plaque on right column

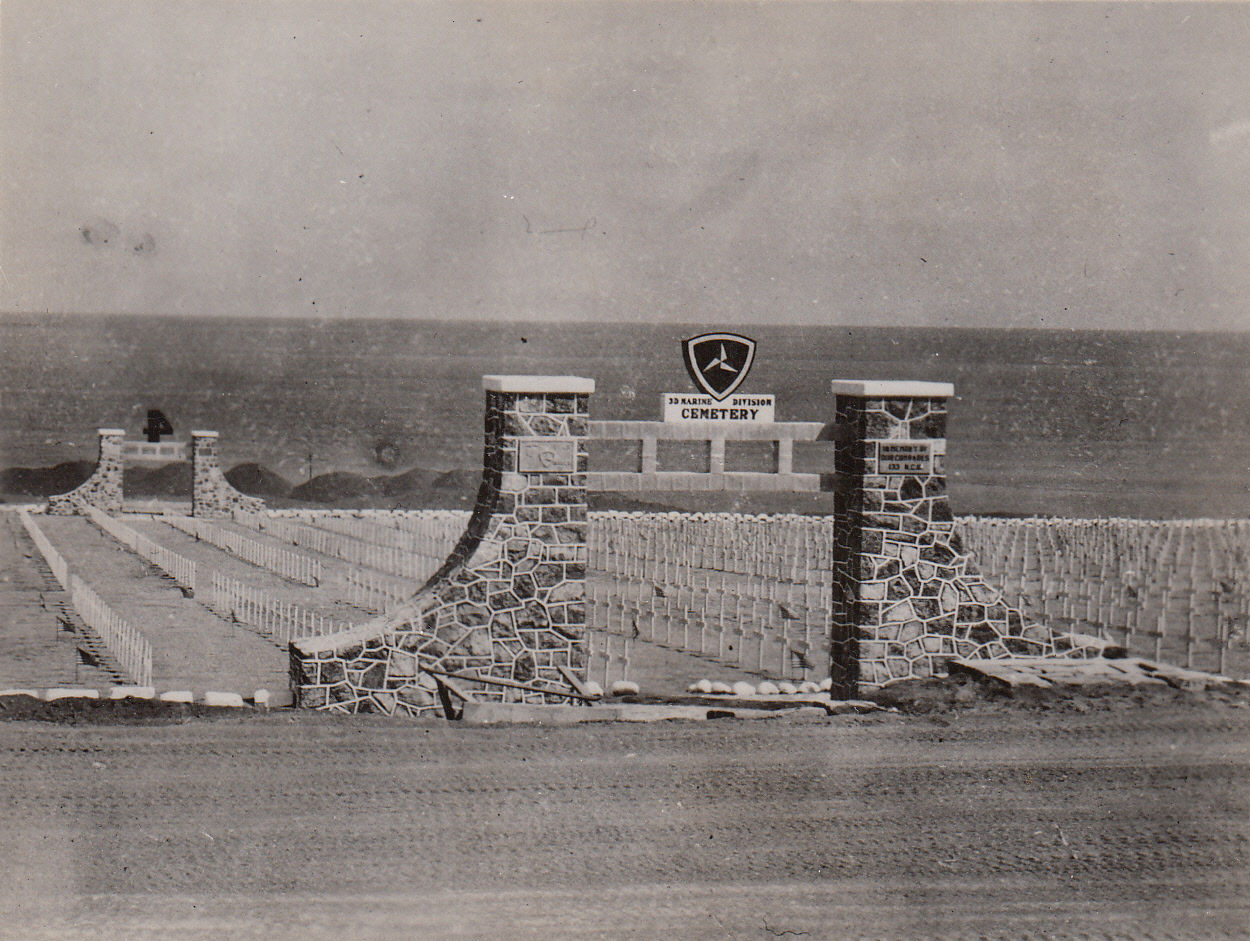
3rd Marine Corps Iwo Jima Cemetery Entrance with built by 133 NCB plaque on right column

On 29 August 2005 Hurricane Katrina made landfall on the Gulf Coast. Within a day, the Seabees from NMCBs 1, 7, and 133 NCB were tasked to Joint Task Force Katrina. They were joined by NMCBs 18 and 40 plus ACB 2 and CBMUs 202 and 303. During the mission 133 and the other Seabees provided extensive humanitarian aid to the Gulf coast including the homes of their own. "The battalion had 118 who either lost their home entirely or had them damaged beyond repair. That November saw the battalion deployed to numerous sites across Southwest Asia with dets to Guam and Whidbey Island. In Iraq, NMCB 133 supported Marines, Special Operations Forces and Iraqi Security Forces.

The battalion's 2007 deployment went to four continents. The battalion worked in support of Combined Joint Task Force – Horn of Africa (CJTF-HOA) building schools in remote villages and making potable water available to the people. A detail assigned to "New Horizons" built schools in rural Belize. NMCB 133 also had a presence in São Tomé, working with Underwater Construction Team ONE (UCT 1) in the reconstruction the Coast Guard only boat launch.

The next two deployments were to Iraq and Okinawa. "NMCB 133's Seabees built the foundation for new buildings on White Beach Naval Facility in Okinawa and restored running water to a village in Malaysia that been without this basic life necessity for over three years. New age power from a wind turbine and solar panel were used to provide power to the pump. At the end of that PACOM tour, the 133 returned to Gulfport, MS for a 15-month homeport and training cycle.

In March 2010, the battalion deployed over 600 Seabees to Afghanistan in support of the 30,000 troop surge. NMCB 133 created a camp on Kandahar Airfield (KAF), Afghanistan for their main-body site. The location was an undeveloped gravel bed when they arrived. Within a month, a fully operational Seabee camp was built and with the Army a power generating supply was set up. The list of tasks completed by the Seabees of 133 includes:

- drilling a 1,200 feet (370 m) deep well that produces approximately 25,000 US gallons (95,000 L; 21,000 imp gal) of water per day.
- construction of numerous Southwest Asia (SWA) Huts over throughout Afghanistan.
- construction of a base electrical grid, shower units, and mess halls.
- significant expansion of four forward operating bases perimeter defenses.
- construction of numerous crow's nest observation towers.
- construction of 3 helo pads.

In October 2010, NMCB 133 received the Atlantic Fleet Best of Type Battle "E" award for its work during the CENTCOM deployment.

In March 2011, the battalion deployed to Camp Shields, Okinawa. Projects there included the renovation of the galley facility, a concrete storage building at White Beach Naval Facility, installation of concrete drainage ditches, and general camp improvements to Camp Shields.

In September 2012, NMCB 133 returned to Afghanistan as the last battalion to deploy to there. During that deployment, the battalion twice broke the NCFs longest convoy record.

A bulldozer and a construction crew arrived in Liberia from Djibouti late September 2014. The mission was site preparation near Monrovia Airport for a dozen or medical facilities to be built by the U.S. military's Operation United Assistance to deal with the Ebola crisis in West Africa.

In August 2017, the wreck of the USS Baltimore was located by the Hawaii Undersea Research Laboratory (HURL) south of Oahu.

== Unit awards ==
NMCB 133 has received several unit citations and commendations. Members who participated in actions that merited the award are authorized to wear the medal or ribbon associated with the award on their uniform. Awards and decorations of the United States Armed Forces have different categories, i.e. Service, Campaign, Unit, and Personal. Unit Citations are distinct from the other decorations. The following unit awards are 133's:

- Navy Unit Commendation : – Iwo Jima
- Navy Unit Commendation: with two bronze stars: 1966–67, Aug–Sept 67, 1968 Vietnam
- Republic of Vietnam Civil Actions Medal Unit Citation
- Republic of Vietnam Gallantry Cross with Palm Unit Award (3)
- Navy Meritorious Unit Commendation : – Det A I 1983–84
- Navy Unit Commendation : – Det NAS Sigonella 1985
- Joint Meritorious Unit Award : – Operation Provide Comfort 1991
- Navy Unit Commendation : – Croatia and Bosnia Herzegovina 1996
- Presidential Unit Citation : – Iraq 2003
- Navy "E" Ribbon : – U.S. Atlantic Fleet Battle "E" 13 times.
- Peltier Award: – 11 times.

=== Campaign and service awards ===
Vietnam Service

NMCB 133's Battle Streamer for Vietnam has four bronze stars: the streamer alone counts as the first award. MCB 133 made 3 tours of Vietnam. The conflict was divided into 18 award periods and the battalion qualifies for five.

- American Campaign Medal - Territory Hawaii
- Asiatic–Pacific Campaign Medal with the Fleet Marine Force insignia and one arrowhead device
- World War II Victory Medal
- Vietnam Campaign Medal service ribbon with 60– Device : – 3 awards
- Vietnam Service Medal: – 5 awards
- : Det Diego Garcia – Iran/Indian Ocean 12/1978 – 05/1979
- : Iran/Indian Ocean 11/1979 – 07/1980
- : Iran/Indian Ocean 01/1981 – 09/1981
- National Defense Service Medal Vietnam,
- National Defense Service Medal Desert Storm, and War on Terror
- Humanitarian Service Medal – Det Fort Allen, 23 Sept 1980
- Humanitarian Service Medal – American Samoa Cyclone Ofa (100-man Det.) 1990
- Armed Forces Expeditionary Medal Bosnia 1995/96
- Southwest Asia Service Medal
- Humanitarian Service Medal – USA Hurricane Georges1998
- Global War on Terrorism Service Medal
- Humanitarian Service Medal – USA Hurricane Katrina 2005
- Global War on Terrorism Expeditionary Medal
- Afghanistan Campaign Medal
- Iraq Campaign Medal

=== 133's Seabee Teams ===
- 13301 - - - Navy Unit Commendation 1968
- 13304 - - - Navy Unit Commendation 1969
- 13305 - - - Navy Meritorious Unit Commendation 1970
- 13306 - - - Navy Meritorious Unit Commendation 1970
- 13307 - - - Navy Meritorious Unit Commendation 1970
- 13308 - - - Navy Meritorious Unit Commendation 1970
- 133Det K- Navy Meritorious Unit Commendation 1970–71

13309 - - - Trust Territories of the Pacific 1971–1972

- 133Det W Navy Meritorious Unit Commendation 1971–72
- 13314 - - - Letter of Commendation: Secretary of the Navy
  - Complete Seabee Teams Report by: Commander Naval Construction Battalion U.S. Pacific Fleet, Tân Sơn Nhất, Republic of Vietnam, Completion Report 1963–1972.
  - 1968 five men received the RVN Gallantry Cross and two the Technical Service Medals from Major General Ngô Quang Trưởng, Commander 1st Division ARVN.
  - 1969 one Navy & Marine Corps Medal for heroism, one Bronze Star, 14 Purple Hearts, 7 RVN Civic Action Medals and 7 Technical Service Medals
  - Fleet Marine Force Combat Operation Insignia The device is a "Restricted" USMC device and is designated as a personal award. The men of the 133rd NCB meet the award requirements: "USN under fire while attached to and under USMC operational control".

== List of commanding officers ==
Commanding officer	Period	Deployed to:	Detachments
Commander Raymond P. Murphy	Sep 1943 – Sep 1945	Hawaii, Iwo Jima	A Co to 1st Bn 23rd Marines., B Co. to 2nd Bn 23rd Marines., C Co.to 3rd Bn 23rd Marines., D Co to 4th Pioneer Bn 25th Marines(assigned to 2nd Bn 25th Marines)
Lt. Cdr. Clarence W. Palmer	Sep 45 – Oct 1945	Iwo Jima	
Lt. George R. Imboden	Oct 45 – Nov 1945	Iwo Jima	det Sasebo with 31st NCB
Lt. Thomas P. Cooke	Nov 45 – Dec 1945	Iwo Jima	
Cdr. Edward H. Marsh, II	Aug 66 – Jul 1968	1967 Vietnam	
Cdr. Frank H. Lewis Jr.	Jul 68 – Nov 1969	1968 Vietnam	Seabee Teams 13301 Tan An and 13302 Phuoc Le
" – - – - – - – - – - – - – - – - – - -"	" – - – - – - – - – - -"	1969 Vietnam	Seabee Team 13303 My Loi, Hue, Thuy Phuoc, Seabee Team 13304 Moen Island
Cdr. J. J. Gawarkiewiez, III	Nov 69 – Mar 1971	1970 Guam	Vietnam, Azores, Aleutians, Seabee Team 13305 Chau Phu, Long Thanh, Seabee Team 13306 Rach Gia, Seabee Team 13307 Phu Vinh, Seabee Team 13308 Ben Tre
Cdr. William C. Conner	Mar 71 – Aug1973	1973 Spain	Diego Garcia, Germany, Italy, Crete, Sicily, Greece, Sardinia, Kusaie Island(Seabee Team 13310)
Cdr. Leland R. Dobler	Aug 73 – Apr1974	1974 Okinawa	Subic Bay, Sasebo, Iwakuni, Taiwan, Misawa, Palau(Seabee Team 13311)
Lt. Cdr. Bruce L. McCall	Apr 74 – Jun1974	1974 Okinawa	" – - – - – - – - – - – - – - – - – - – - – - – - – - – - – - – - – - – - – - – - – - – - – - – - "
Cdr. Richard A. Lowery	Jun 74 – Jul1976	1975 Puerto Rico	Gitmo, Bermuda, St. Thomas U.S.Virgin Islands, Vieques Island, Yap Island(Seabee Team 13312)
" – - – - – - – - – - – - – - – - – -"	" – - – - – - – - – - – "	1976 Diego Garcia	
Cdr. Gene Davis	Jul 76 – Jul 1978	1977 Spain	Sicily, Greece, Crete
Cdr. George D. Fraunces	Jul 78 – Oct 1979	1978 Puerto Rico	Gitmo, Eleuthera, Antiqua, Keflavik, Diego Garcia, Vieques Island, Yap Island (Seabee Team 13313)
" – - – - – - – - – - – - – - – - – - "	" – - – - – - – - – - -"	1979 Diego Garcia	
Capt. Herbert H. Lewis Jr.	Oct 79 – Jul 1981	1981 Guam	Diego Garcia, Midway, Palau, Yokosuka Japan. Seabee Team 13314
Capt. Dorwin C. Black	Jul 81 – Jun 1983	1982 Spain	Sigonella, Nea Makri Greece, Souda bay, Crete, Holy Loch, Scotland
Capt. A. A. Kannegiesser	Jun 83 – Aug 1985	1983 Puerto Rico	Guantanamo Bay, Vieques Island, Bermuda, Andros Island, Yap
Capt. Richard E. Brown	Aug 85 – Jun 1987	1986 Puerto Rico	Guantanamo Bay, Andros Island, Bahamas, Vieques Island, Panama Canal Zone
Cdr. Bruce St. Peter	Jun 87 – Aug 1989	1987 Okinawa	Adak, Yokusuka, Iwakuni, Yap Island
" – - – - – - – - – - – - – - – - – - "	"- – - – - – - – - – - -"	1989 Spain	Bermuda, Edzell and Holy Loch Scotland, Camp David, Cartagana, Spain
Cdr. Donald B. Hutchins	Aug 89 – Sep 1991	1990 Guam	Midway, Palau, Philippines, Diego Garcia, Tinian, American Samoa
" – - – - – - – - – - – - – - – - – -"	"- – - – - – - – - – - -"	1991 Iraq/Turkey	
Cdr. Douglas F. Elznic	Sep 91 – Jun 1993	1991 Spain	Sigonella, Souada Bay Crete, Edzell & Holy Loch Scotland, Camp David, Moron Spain, Ghana, Senegal
Cdr. Richard J. McAfee	Jun 93 – Apr 1995	1994 Guam	Diego Garcia, Chinhar, Korea, Ban Chan Khrem, Thailand, El Salvador, San Diego CA, Palau-Cat team
Cdr. Gary A. Engle	Apr 95 – Jun 1997	1995 Spain	Croatia, Bosnia-Herzegovina, Africa, Crete, Sicily, Italy, Great Britain, Camp David
Cdr. Paul Bosco	Jun 97 – Jun 1999	1997 Guam	San Diego CA, Lemoore CA, Fallon NV, Bangor WA, Kenya, Palau-CAT team, Palau & Kosrae-Tiger team
"- – - – - – - – - – - – - – - – - – "	"- – - – - – - – - – - -"	1998 Spain	Sicily, Crete, St. Mawgan England, Camp David, Bosnia-Herzegovina
Cdr. Katherine L. Gregory	Jun 99 – Jul 2001	2000 Spain	Sicily, Crete, London, Camp David, Moldova, Tunisia
Cdr. Douglas G. Morton	Jul '01 – Jun 2003	2001 Guam	Diego Garcia, Bahrain, Carat, Hawaii, Fallon NV, (Lemoore, El Centro, Camp Pendleton, San Diego CA), Bangor WA, Palau-Cat team
"- - - - - - - - - - - - - - - - - - -"	"- - - - - - - - - - -"	2001 Afghanistan	Gitmo
"- - - - - - - - - - - - - - - - - - -"	"- - - - - - - - - - - "	2003 SWA Iraq	Kuwait, Zubaydiyah, Dominican Republic, Andros Island, Gitmo
Cdr. Jeffery T. Borowy	Jun '03 – May 2005	2003 SWA Iraq	Kuwait
Cdr. Allan M. Stratman	May '05 – May 2007	2005 Iraq	Guam, Whidby Island
Cdr. Paul J. Odenthal	May '07 – Jun 2009	2007 Kuwait, 2008 Okinawa	Iraq, Djibouti, GTMO, Spain. Guam, Singapore, Chinhae, Yokosuka, Sasebo, Philippines, San Clemente Island, Palau-Cat team
Cdr. Chris M. Kurgan	Jun '09 – May 2011	2010 Afghanistan	Kandahar, Tarnak, Beland, Dand, Walakan, Jelawur, FOBs Shindand, Wilson, Walton & Wolverine
Cdr. Nick D. Yamodis	May '11 – Jun 2013	2011 Okinawa	
" - - - - - - - - - - - - - - - - - -"	" - - - - - - - - - - -"	2012 Afghanistan	Liberia, Niger, Djibouti
Cdr. Jeffrey S. Powell	Jun '13 – Jun 2015	2014 Spain	Romania, Bahrain, Djibouti, Niger, Chad, Guam, Palau, Micronesia, Kwajalein
Cdr. Miguel Dieguez	Jun '15 – Jun 2017	2015 Spain	Marshall Islands, Micronesia, Cameroon, Niger, Kwajalein, Guam
Cdr. Luke Greene	Jun '17 -	2017 Spain	Bahrain, Djibouti, Guam, Kwajalein, Palau- CAT 133–27, Vietnam
Cdr. Frank Carrol
Cdr. James W. Segalla
Cdr. Archer

== Notes ==
- On Saipan, the 4th Marine Division assigned the 121st CB and 4th Pioneers as the Shore Party
- On Okinawa, the 1st Marine division Shore Party was composed of 1/2 the 11th Special NCB and the 145th NCB, the Shore Party for the 6th Marine Division was composed of the other half of the 11th Special NCB and the 58th NCB.
- Prior to the 133rd being assigned as the 23rd's Shore Party the 71st NCB had been tasked as the Shore Party for the 3rd Marine Division on Bougainville in 1943.
- "TAD" is contemporary U.S. military terminology that was not used during WWII. During WWII the equivalent terminology was the word "attached".
- The shore party of Peleliu painted a three-inch orange circle on their helmets and greens to identify them from or for the other troops.
- 1944 Construction Battalion combat organization, NAVDOCKS-100, p.i-5
- 17th Special(segregated), 33rd and 73rd CBs were Shore Party with the 1st Pioneers of the 1st Marine Division on Peleliu in 1944.
- 25 NCB was Shore Party to the 3rd, 9th and 21st Marine Regiments of the 3rd Marine Division on Guam.
- 41st Naval Construction Regiment: 31st, 62nd, 95th, & 133rd CBs
- 53rd NCB was Shore Party to the 2nd Raiders on Bougainville and Third Raiders on Puruata Island

== See also ==
- Admiral Ben Moreell
- Amphibious Construction Battalion 1 (ACB-1)
- Amphibious Construction Battalion 2 (ACB-2)
- Civil Engineer Corps United States Navy
- Naval Amphibious Base Little Creek
- Naval Amphibious Base Coronado
- Naval Construction Battalion Center (Gulfport, Mississippi)
- Naval Construction Battalion Center Port Hueneme
- Naval Mobile Construction Battalion 1
- Naval Mobile Construction Battalion 3
- Naval Mobile Construction Battalion 4
- Naval Mobile Construction Battalion 5
- Naval Mobile Construction Battalion 11
- Seabees in World War II
- Underwater Construction Teams

== External links and further reading ==
- A 133 vet's Iwo account.
- Amphibious Operations Report, Capture of Iwo Jima, 16 February to 16 March 1945, UNITED STATES FLEET, Headquarters of the Commander in Chief, NAVY DEPARTMENT, WASHINGTON 25, D.C., 17 July 1945, p. 5-3 to 5-6
- Annex Fox, RCT 23 Operation Report Section V, Comments and Recommendations, (4. Supply) Shore Party, Beach Party, p. 64/248
- Bloodstained Sands: US. Amphibious Operations in World War II, Michael G. Walling, Bloomsbury Publishing Plc. 2017. p. 434 (A Co. 133)
- Col. Shelton Scales and 133rd NCB": Fighting Seabees of Iwo Jima on "War Stories" YouTube with Lt. Col. Oliver North
- Navy Civil Engineer Corps Bulletin, Vol 2 NAVDOCKS P-2 No 14, January 1948, Iwo Jima
- NMCB 133 Command home page
- NAVDOCKS-100, January 1944, U.S.Naval Construction Battalion Administration Manual
- NMCB 62 Alumni website
- William Bradford Huie: From Omaha to Okinawa- The Story of the Seabees 1945, Chapter II, Iwo Jima, pp. 27–88
- 4th Marine Division Operations Report, Iwo Jima
- 133 NCB & NMCB 133 Unit Histories and Cruisebooks NHHC: Seabee Museum search "deployment completion reports"
