= Kahana Bay =

Bay and beach park in Oahu, Hawaii

Kahana Bay Beach Park
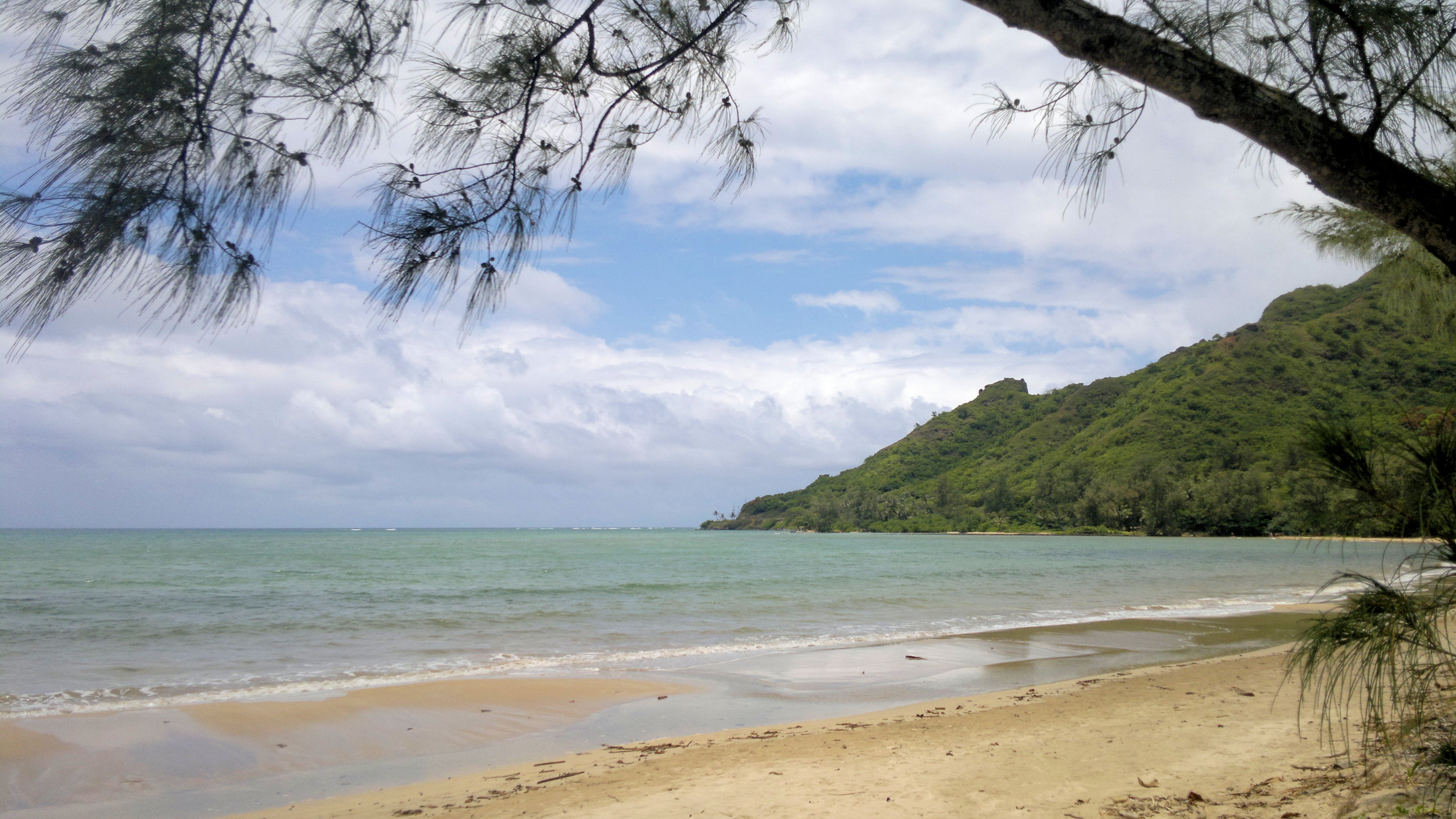
- Kahana Bay

- Location within Hawaii
- Location: Hawaii, U.S.
- Nearest city: Kaʻaʻawa
- Coordinates: 21°33′23″N 157°52′29″W
- Governing body: Hawai'i Department of Land and Natural Resources

Kahana Bay and Kahana Bay Beach Park are located on the windward side of the island of Oahu in the state of Hawaii.

== Description ==
Kahana Bay and beach park is located along Kamehameha Highway on Oahu adjacent to Ahupua'a O Kahana State Park between Kaʻaʻawa and Punaluʻu. The beach is known for fishing, wading and serenity and although it is a beach park, it has limited facilities due to its remote location.

== History ==
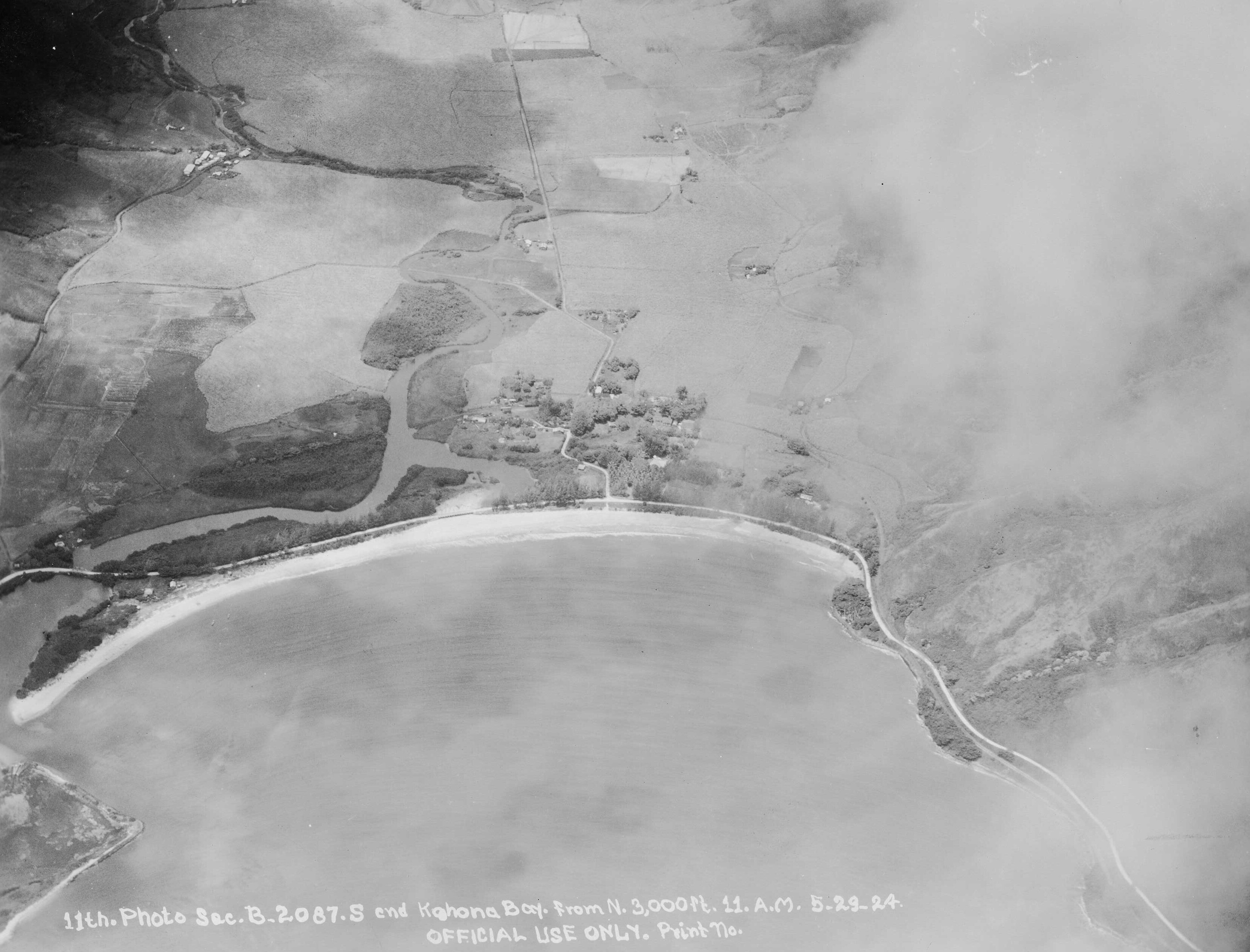
Kahana Bay, 1936

The area around Kahana, especially mauka (up hill), was historically a native Hawaiian fishing and farming community prior to Western contact. Due to the abundant fresh water and fertile soil in the valley, the area was able to sustain a small population. Kahana Bay was said to provide a sustainable supply of fish and shellfish.

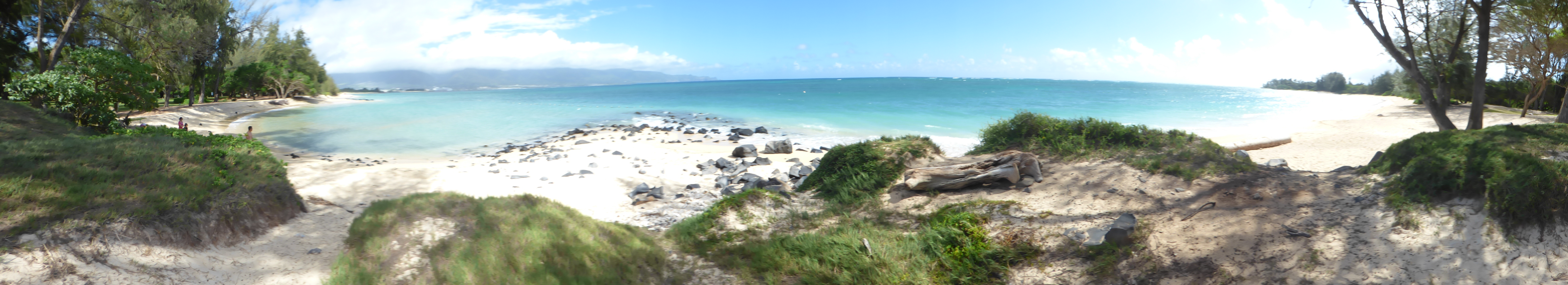
Sporobolus virginicus-panoram ocean shoreline-Kanaha Beach-Maui
