= Kahuna (disambiguation) =

A kahuna is a Hawaiian priest, sorcerer, magician, wizard, minister, or expert in any profession.

Kahuna may also refer to:

- Kahuna (company), a software company
- FC Kahuna, a musical production team
- Dodge Kahuna, an automobile
- Kahoona (or Great Kahoona), a character in the Gidget novels by Frederick Kohner and related films
- Kahuna, a fictional character in the 2004 film Superbabies: Baby Geniuses 2
- Kehuna, the formation of the Kohanim (Jewish priests of patrilineal descent of Ahron)

== See also ==
- Big Kahuna (disambiguation)
- Kahana (disambiguation)
