= George Belly Ukeke =

Famous orator and politician of the Kingdom of Hawaii

George Belly ʻŪkēkē

Member of the House of Representatives
- In office 1851–52, 1856, 1860, 1866–67
- Monarchs: Kamehameha III; Kamehameha IV; Kamehameha V

Personal details
- Born: c. 1813 Punaluʻu, Koʻolauloa, Oahu, Kingdom of Hawaii
- Died: October 24, 1869 Kahano, Koʻolauloa, Oʻahu
- Relatives: Kaleohano Opio
- Occupation: Schoolmaster, Orator, Politician

George Belly ʻŪkēkē (c. 1813–1869) was an orator and politician of the Kingdom of Hawaii. Serving in the House of Representatives, he was known for his eccentric speeches.

== Biography ==
He was born around 1813 in Punaluʻu, Koʻolauloa District, located in the northeastern part of the island of Oʻahu. He lived with a man named Kaleohano Opio until his death; his relation to ʻŪkēkē is not identified in existing sources. Afterwards, he was sent to the American Protestant missionary Rev. John S. Emerson at Waialua and received "the usual common school education". He worked as a schoolmaster and was a regular church member.

In 1851, ʻŪkēkē ran for the Hawaiian legislature in 1851, representing his home district of Koʻolauloa, in the first popular election for representatives in the Kingdom of Hawaii. He won the seat due to his popularity in his district. ʻŪkēkē served as a legislator in the sessions of 1851, 1852, 1856, 1860, 1866, 1867, as a member of the House of Representatives, the lower house of the Hawaiian legislature. He was a noted orator but was prone to being eccentric in his speeches. His obituary described how: "ʻŪkēkē's record as an orator, is one of eccentricity of thought and speech, and whatever may have been the value of force of his argument, they were put in such a fantastical way, that he always secured listeners among his fellow members." In the 1866 session, ʻŪkēkē opposed an unpopular bill by Minister of Finance Charles Coffin Harris to introduce paper currency and prankishly suggested that dog's and pig's teeth be reintroduced as mediums of exchange instead. After the death of Crown Princess Victoria Kamāmalu, he proposed a resolution directing the cabinet ministers to find a wife for the bachelor King Kamehameha V, stating "I take great interest in my Sovereign, as he is the only one left. I want this resolution to pass, as his sister has just died without leaving any issue." He also served as tax collector for Koʻolauloa on August 21, 1866. In 1867, he received a partial license to practice law.

ʻŪkēkē died on October 24, 1869, at his home in Kahano, Koʻolauloa, at the age of 56. His obituary described how he "has all his life, been identified, with the social and political interests of that district [Koʻolauloa]". On his deathbed, he requested that there will be no wailing, a traditional expression of Hawaiian mourning, over his body after his death and instead for his friends and neighbors to express their grief through hymns and prayers.

== Bibliography ==
- Hawaii (1918). Lydecker, Robert Colfax (ed.). Roster Legislatures of Hawaii, 1841–1918. Honolulu: Hawaiian Gazette Company. OCLC 60737418.
- Kuykendall, Ralph Simpson (1953). The Hawaiian Kingdom 1854–1874, Twenty Critical Years. Vol. 2. Honolulu: University of Hawaii Press. ISBN 978-0-87022-432-4. OCLC 47010821.
- Osorio, Jon Kamakawiwoʻole (2002). Dismembering Lāhui: A History of the Hawaiian Nation to 1887. Honolulu: University of Hawaii Press. ISBN 0-8248-2549-7. OCLC 48579247.
- Twain, Mark (1975). Anderson, Frederick; Frank, Michael B.; Sanderson, Kenneth M. (eds.). Mark Twain's Notebooks & Journals, Volume I: (1855–1873). Oakland, CA: University of California Press. ISBN 978-0-520-90538-2. OCLC 2015814.
