= Punaluu =

Punaluu or Punaluʻu may refer to:

- Punaluu, in Hawaii County, Hawaii
- Punaluu, Hawaii, in Honolulu County, Hawaii
- Punaluʻu Beach, in Hawaii County, Hawaii
- Punaluu Kahawai, in Hawaii County, Hawaii
