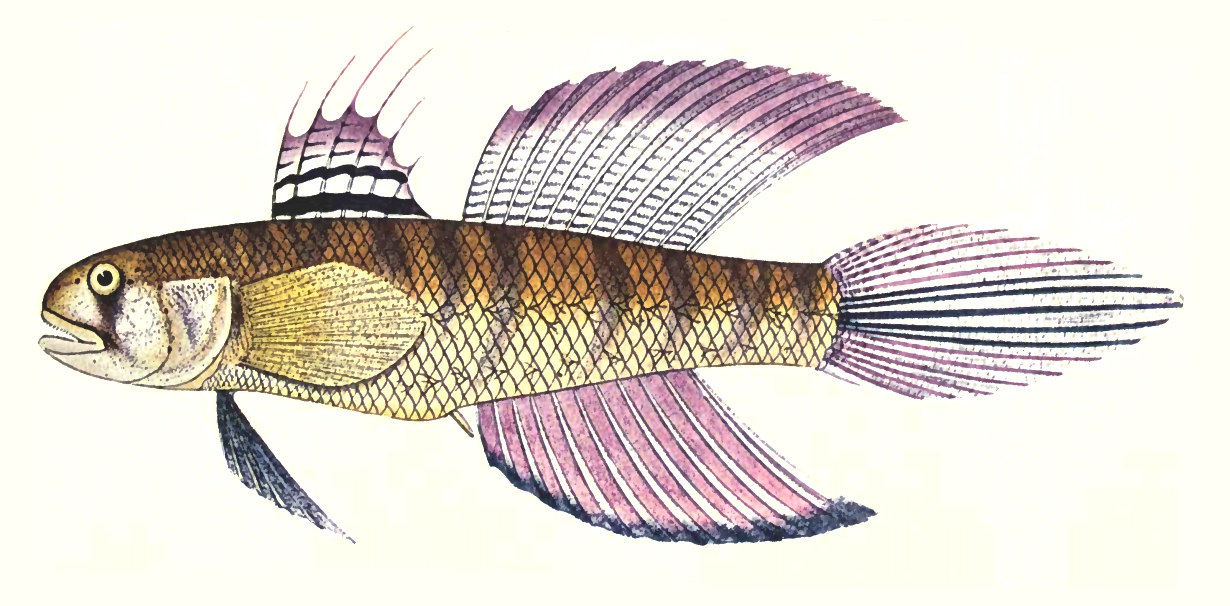

Scientific classification
- Kingdom: Animalia
- Phylum: Chordata
- Class: Actinopterygii
- Order: Gobiiformes
- Family: Oxudercidae
- Genus: Stenogobius
- Species: S. ophthalmoporus

Binomial name
- Stenogobius ophthalmoporus (Bleeker, 1853)

Synonyms
- Gobius ophthalmoporus Bleeker, 1853

= Stenogobius ophthalmoporus =

Species of fish

Stenogobius ophthalmoporus is a species of goby native to Japan, Taiwan, Viet Nam, Philippines and Indonesia. Males of this species can reach a length of 14.2 centimetres (5.6 in) SL.

== Etymology ==
The genus name “stenogobius” was derived from a Greek word and Latin word respectively; Stenos(Narrow) and Gobius(Gudgeon). The species "Ophthalmoporus” was coined from the greek words, Opthalmos(eye) and porous(pores).

== Habitat ==
Stenogobius ophthalmoporus are found in Freshwater, brackish, demersal environment and tropical regions.

== Location ==
Stenogobius ophthalmoporus are vastly distributed in Indo-Pacific tropical regions from the Southeast Africa to Indonesia, and from Western to Central Pacific. Stenogobius species are located in the downstreams section less than 30 m to a few kilometres from the sea, in creeks.
