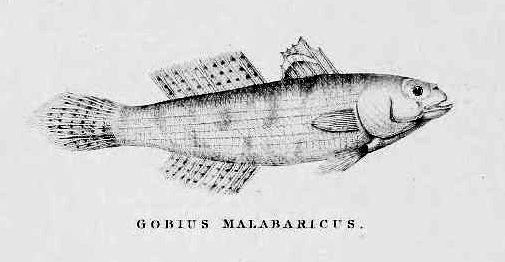

Conservation status
- Data Deficient (IUCN 3.1)

Scientific classification
- Kingdom: Animalia
- Phylum: Chordata
- Class: Actinopterygii
- Order: Gobiiformes
- Family: Oxudercidae
- Genus: Stenogobius
- Species: S. gymnopomus

Binomial name
- Stenogobius gymnopomus (Bleeker, 1853)

Synonyms
- Gobius gymnopomus Bleeker, 1853; Gobius hilgendorfi Pfeffer, 1896 (misspelling); Gobius hilgendorfii Pfeffer, 1896; Gobius malabaricus Day, 1865; Stenogobius malabaricus (Day, 1865)

= Stenogobius gymnopomus =

Species of fish

The Malabar goby, Stenogobius gymnopomus is a species of goby endemic to the Indo-Pacific regional countries such as India, Somalia, Indonesia, Andaman Islands. where it can be found in marine, brackish and fresh waters. The habitats include coastal waters, estuaries and tidal zone of rivers. This species can reach a length of 15.0 centimetres (5.9 in) SL. It feeds mainly on cladocerans, as well as fish eggs and scales. This species is a batch spawner which has a prolonged spawning season, extending from August to December in Kerala. The female's fecundity was between 46,323 and 61,291 eggs while the sex ratios favours males in local populations.
