= Ahupuaʻa O Kahana State Park =

Park on Oʻahu island, Hawaii, US

- formerly Kahana Valley State Park
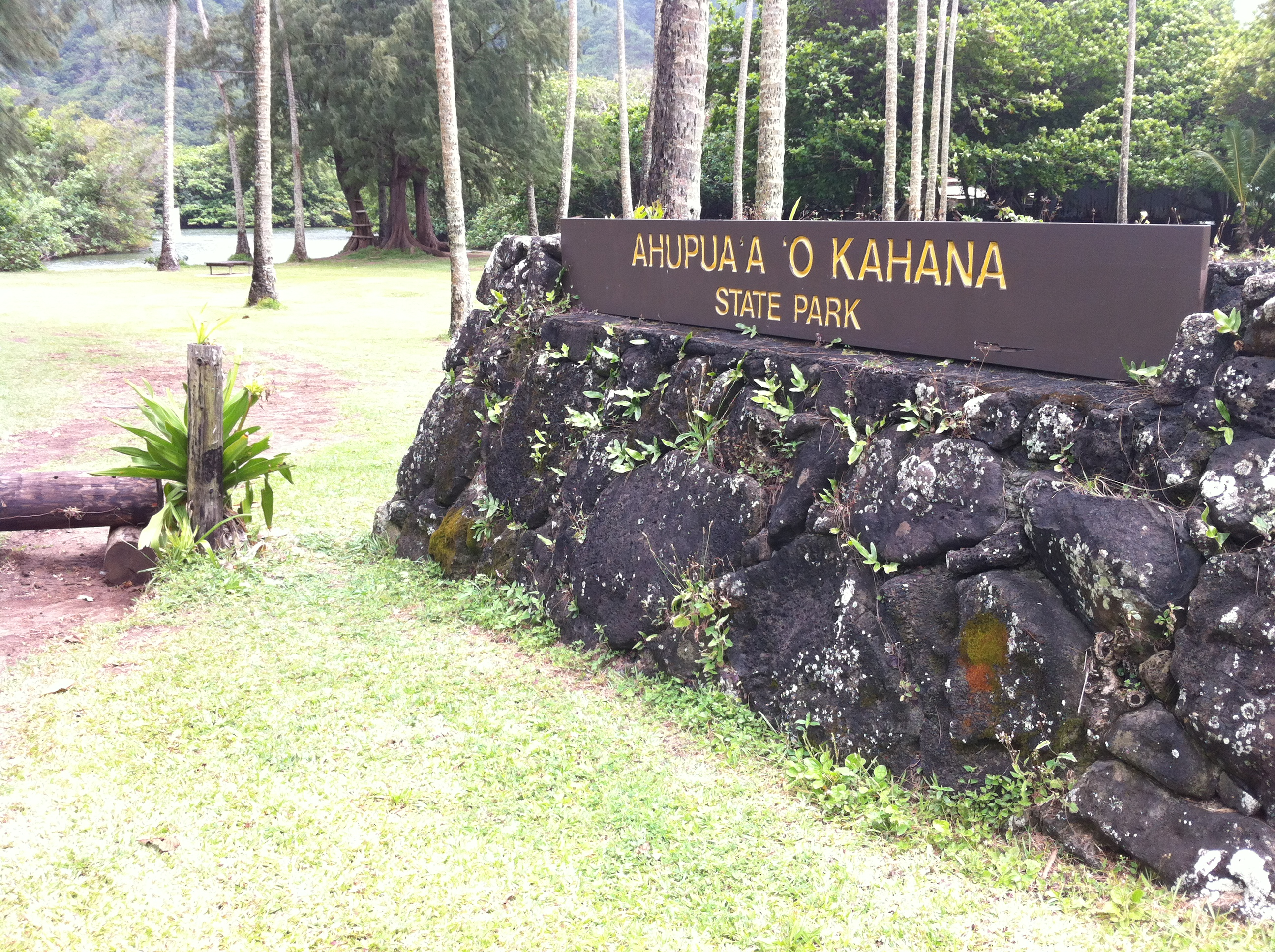
- Entrance to Kahana Valley
- Interactive map of Ahupuaʻa O Kahana State Park
- Type: State park
- Location: Oʻahu
- Nearest city: Kahana Bay
- Coordinates: 21.547°N 157.876°W
- Area: 5,300 acres (2,100 ha)
- Open: Summer: 7:00am to 7:45pm Winter: 7:00am to 6:45pm
- Designation: State park
- Website: https://dlnr.hawaii.gov/dsp/parks/oahu/ahupuaa-o-kahana-state-park/

Ahupuaʻa O Kahana State Park, formerly Kahana Valley State Park, is located on the windward side of Oʻahu between Kaʻaʻawa and Punaluʻu in the state of Hawaii. The park is located mauka (up hill) from Kahana Bay. It is Hawaii's only public ahupuaʻa, and it stretches from the sea to the tip of Puʻu Pauao at 2670 feet. It has a tropical climate, and it is one of the wettest areas in Oʻahu, averaging nearly 300 inches per year in parts of the valley. The main purpose of the park is to embrace and teach Hawaiian culture.

== History ==
Before Western civilization came to the islands, Kahana had a strong community. It had fresh water, abundant seafood, and a stable supply of taro, which was grown in fields with advanced irrigation systems. However, around the time of King Kamehameha's unification of Hawaii in the 1800s, the community fell into steep decline due to foreign diseases, sugarcane cultivation and the military's use of the valley as a World War II jungle warfare training center, through the arrival of Europeans. In the early 1900s most of the valley was owned by Mary E. Foster, and after her death the valley was given to Bishop Estate. The state proposed a purchase of the ahupua'a, which was rejected. The Foster estate was not satisfied with the purchase plan, which was for $5,000,000 being paid 1 million per year for 5 years, as the then current legislature could not ensure future payments. The state forced the purchase through condemnation, later fulfilling their debt. The land later became a state park. Today, only 31 families live in the valley.

== Fauna ==
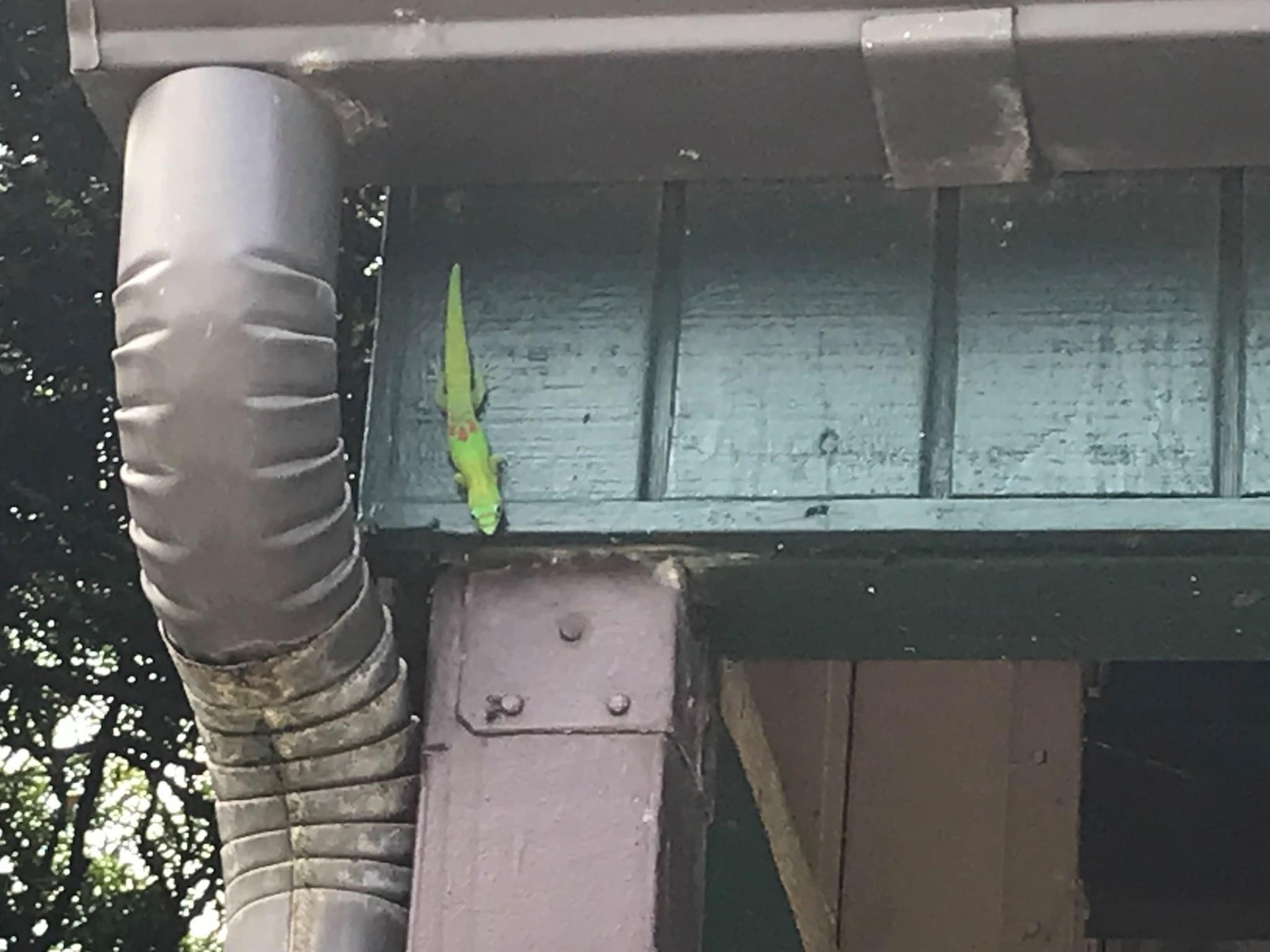
Gold dust day gecko at Ahupuaʻa O Kahana State Park

Kahana State Park supports a wide variety of birds and fish. Oʻopu naniha (Stenogobius hawaiiensis), a native freshwater fish, can be found in the streams of the lower valley. ʻAmaʻama (flathead mullet, Mugil cephalus) and milkfish (Chanos chanos) are common in the Huilua Fishpond. Bird species that can be found in the lower valley include Pacific golden plover (Pluvialis fulva), ruddy turnstone (Arenaria interpres), sanderling (Calidris alba), wandering tattler (Tringa incana), ʻaukuʻu (black-crowned night heron, Nycticorax nycticorax), ʻalae keʻokeʻo (Hawaiian coot, Fulica alai), and ʻalae ʻula (Hawaiian gallinule, Gallinula chloropus sandvicensis). The last two species are endangered. In the upper valley are many native species of songbirds, such as the ʻapapane (Himatione sanguinea) and Oʻahu ʻamakihi (Hemignathus flavus), along with non-native species of mynah, cardinal, dove and ricebird.

Feral pigs were introduced to the valley by the first Polynesian settlers. While this is an ideal environment for the pigs, these animals are a serious threat to the rest of the valley.

== Flora ==
The expanse of land in Kahana Valley from the sea to the mountains contains many different vegetation zones. The lowlands consist of koa (Acacia koa), hibiscus, hala (Pandanus tectorius), and pasture. Further up the valley, in the wetter areas, the dominant vegetation consists of mountain apple (Syzygium malaccense), strawberry guava (Psidium littorale), ti (Cordyline fruticosa) and bamboo.

== Activities ==
=== Hiking ===
There are two hiking trails in the valley, both of which do not require permits and are suitable for whole families. The first is Kapa'ele'ele Ko'a and Keaniani Lookout Trail. It is a mile long loop that takes a decent hiker roughly an hour. The second is the Nakoa Trail, which is named so for the numerous koa (Acacia koa) found along this 2.5-mile trail through tropical rainforest. Hikers on this trail can swim in the Kahana stream, which is traversed twice.

=== Camping and hunting ===
There are ten campsites located on the beach which can be used by permit only. Hunting is also permitted within designated boundaries on weekends and holidays only, and by permit only.

== See also ==
- List of Hawaiian state parks
