= Elizabeth Midlarsky =

American psychologist

Elizabeth Midlarsky (1941–2023) was an American professor of psychology and education at Teachers College, Columbia University.

== Education ==
Elizabeth Midlarsky completed a Bachelor of Arts at Brooklyn College. She earned a Master of Arts and doctor of philosophy from Northwestern University.

== Career ==
Midlarsky was a psychologist and a professor of clinical psychology at Teachers College, Columbia University. Midlarsky was a pioneer in the field of altruism, inspired by helpers during the Holocaust. Applying clinical psychology, Midlarsky researched what caused people to help others with no benefit to themselves, as well as the impacts of being rescued from the genocide in survivors and their descendants.

== Personal life ==
Midlarsky was Jewish. She was married to Manus Midlarsky, and they had three children together. Her middle daughter is a rabbi and married to a rabbi. Midlarsky died on January 4, 2023.

== Selected works ==
=== Books ===
- Midlarsky, Elizabeth; Kahana, Eva (1994). Altruism in Later Life. SAGE Publications. ISBN 9780803927681.
- Denmark, Florence; Gielen, Uwe; Krauss, Herbert H.; Midlarsky, Elizabeth; Wesner, R. (2006). Violence in Schools: Cross-National and Cross-Cultural Perspectives. Springer Science+Business Media. ISBN 9780387288116.
