= Keke Lindgard =

American fashion model (born 1994)

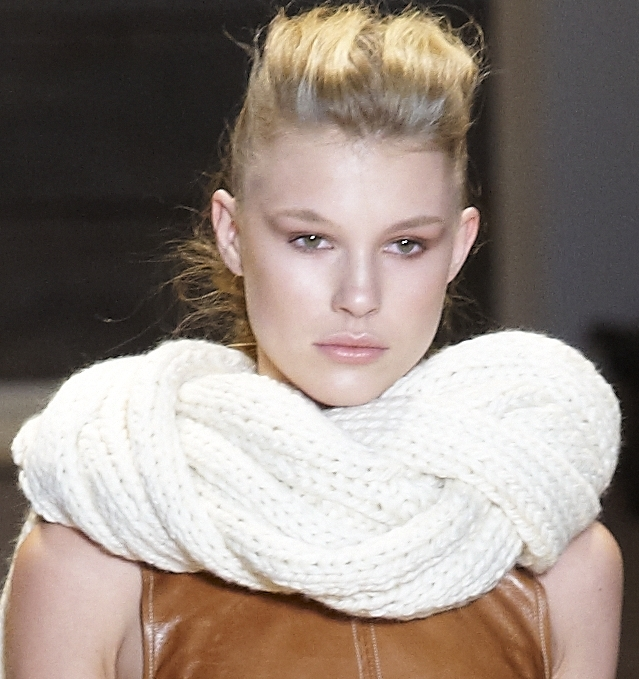
- Lindgard walks for ADAM in 2010
- Born: Katelin E. Lindgard; August 15, 1994 (age 32); Kaʻaʻawa, Hawaii
- Occupation: Fashion model
- Modeling information
- Height: 1.78 m (5 ft 10 in)
- Hair color: Blonde
- Eye color: Hazel
- Agency: Elite Model Management (New York, Paris, Barcelona); Why Not Model Management (Milan); Two Management (Copenhagen); Modelwerk (Hamburg); MP Stockholm (Stockholm); Nomad Management (Miami Beach) (mother agency)

Katelin "Keke" Lindgard is an American fashion model.

== Early life ==
Katelin Lindgard was born in Hawaii, and has a sister named Lilli.

== Career ==
Lindgard signed with Wilhelmina Models at age 15, and debuted at Rag & Bone. She then walked for brands including Prada, Miu Miu, Hermès, Céline, Louis Vuitton, DKNY, Tommy Hilfiger, Vera Wang, Bottega Veneta, Dolce & Gabbana, Giambattista Valli, Lanvin, Valentino, Armani Privé, and Dior. She has done campaigns for Gucci, Ralph Lauren, D&G, Trussardi, and DKNY.

Lindgard walked in the 2016 Victoria’s Secret Fashion Show.
