= Big Kahuna =

Big Kahuna may refer to:

== People ==
- Brian Ching (b. 1978), American soccer player
- Duke Kahanamoku (1890–1968), Hawaiian swimmer, actor and businessman
- Jon Miller (b. 1951), American baseball announcer
- Roby Yonge (1943–1997), American radio disc jockey (eastern U.S.)
- Parker Walton (b. 2007), American Ultimate Frisbee player

== Other uses ==
- Big Kahuna (series), a series of games by Reflexive Entertainment
- Big Kahuna's, a waterpark in Destin, FL
- The Big Kahuna (film)
- Big Kahuna Burger, a fictional restaurant in films by Quentin Tarantino and Robert Rodriguez
- Big Kahuna Rams, a Canadian junior football team
- Big Kahuna, a water slide at the Darien Lake Theme Park Resort
- Big Kahuna, a wave pool at Noah's Ark Waterpark

== See also ==
- Kahuna (disambiguation)
- Josh Treacy, Australian Rules footballer nicknamed "The Big Cohuna"
