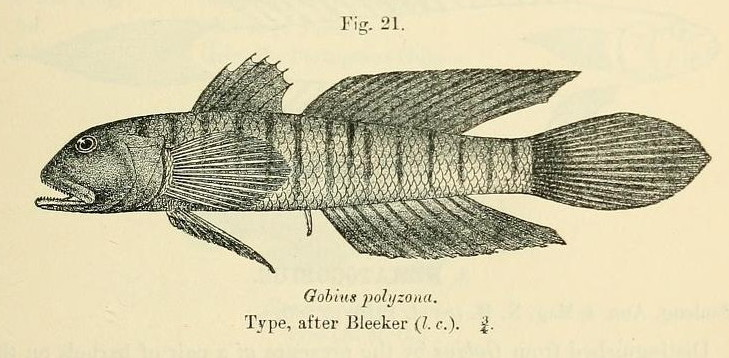

Conservation status
- Least Concern (IUCN 3.1)

Scientific classification
- Kingdom: Animalia
- Phylum: Chordata
- Class: Actinopterygii
- Order: Gobiiformes
- Family: Oxudercidae
- Genus: Stenogobius
- Species: S. polyzona

Binomial name
- Stenogobius polyzona (Bleeker, 1867)

Synonyms
- Gobius polyzona Bleeker, 1867

= Chinestripe goby =

Species of fish

Stenogobius polyzona, the Chinestripe goby, is a species of goby native to streams and rivers on Madagascar and Réunion. Males of this species can reach a length of 15 centimetres (5.9 in) SL while females can reach 6.6 centimetres (2.6 in) SL.
