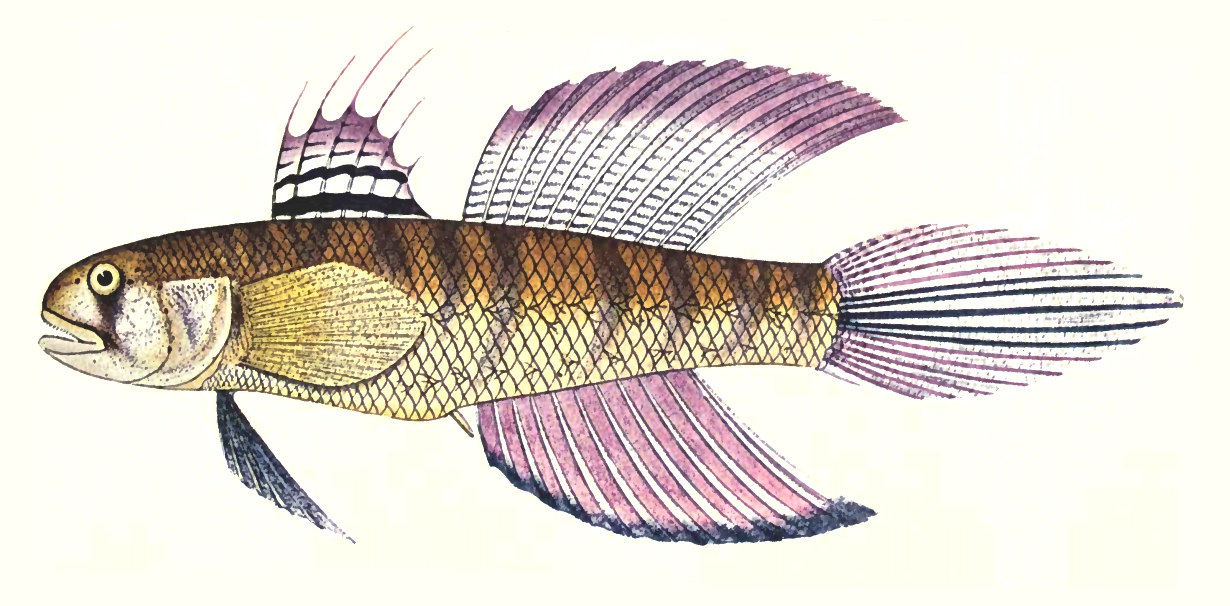
- Stenogobius ophthalmoporus

Scientific classification
- Kingdom: Animalia
- Phylum: Chordata
- Class: Actinopterygii
- Order: Gobiiformes
- Family: Oxudercidae
- Subfamily: Gobionellinae
- Genus: Stenogobius; Bleeker, 1874

Type species
- Gobius gymnopomus Bleeker, 1853

Synonyms
- Insularigobius Watson, 1991

= Stenogobius =

Genus of fishes

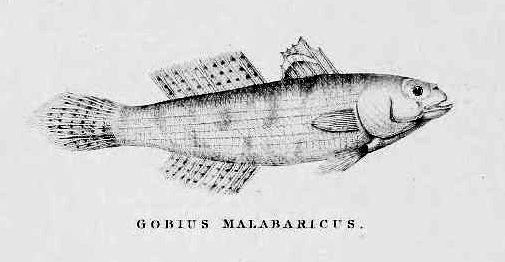
Stenogobius gymnopomus

Stenogobius is a genus of fish in the goby subfamily, Gobionellinae. They are native to fresh, brackish and marine waters along the coasts of the Indian and Pacific Oceans. They are known commonly as coastal stream gobies.

The genus is divided into two subgenera. Subgenus Stenogobius have varied coloration and scale arrangements, and Insularigobius species are strongly sexually dimorphic.

== Species ==
There are currently 28 recognized species in this genus:

- Stenogobius alleni Watson, 1991
- Stenogobius beauforti (M. C. W. Weber, 1907) (Beaufort's goby)
- Stenogobius blokzeyli (Bleeker, 1860)
- Stenogobius caudimaculosus Watson, 1991
- Stenogobius fehlmanni Watson, 1991
- Stenogobius genivittatus (Valenciennes, 1837) (chinstripe goby)
- Stenogobius gymnopomus (Bleeker, 1853)
- Stenogobius hawaiiensis Watson, 1991
- Stenogobius hilgendorfii (Pfeffer, 1896)
- Stenogobius hoesei Watson, 1991
- Stenogobius ingeri Watson, 1991
- Stenogobius keletaona Keith & Marquet, 2006 (Keletaona's Goby)
- Stenogobius kenyae J. L. B. Smith, 1959 (Africa rivergoby)
- Stenogobius kyphosus Watson, 1991
- Stenogobius lachneri G. R. Allen, 1991 (Bintuni goby)
- Stenogobius laterisquamatus (M. C. W. Weber, 1907)
- Stenogobius macropterus (Duncker, 1912)
- Stenogobius marinus Watson, 1991
- Stenogobius marqueti Watson, 1991
- Stenogobius mekongensis Watson, 1991
- Stenogobius ophthalmoporus (Bleeker, 1853)
- Stenogobius polyzona (Bleeker, 1867) (chinstripe goby)
- Stenogobius psilosinionus Watson, 1991 (teardrop goby)
- Stenogobius randalli Watson, 1991
- Stenogobius squamosus Watson, 1991
- Stenogobius watsoni G. R. Allen, 2004
- Stenogobius yateiensis Keith, Watson & Marquet, 2002 (Yaté's goby)
- Stenogobius zurstrassenii (Popta, 1911)
