= Walakan =

Village in Kandahar Province, Afghanistan

- Village
- Location in Afghanistan
- Coordinates: 31°33′12″N 65°38′26″E
- Country: Afghanistan
- Province: Kandahar Province
- District: Kandahar District
- Time zone: + 4.30

Walakan (Pashto: ولکن) is a village in Kandahar Province, in southern Afghanistan. It is situated 5 miles southwest of Kandahar, 1 mile west of Karezak. Walakan is said to have been one of four villages given to the original Parsiwan inhabitants. Walakan, along with Zalakhan is said to have been part of sector which the Soviets left unguarded during the war.

On July 10, 2010, US Staff Sergeant Jesse Ainsworth (aged 24) of Texas was killed near Walakan by an explosive device during Operation Enduring Freedom.

== See also ==
- Kandahar Province
