= Kahuna (company) =

- Type: Private startup
- Industry: Marketing software
- Founded: 2012
- Founder: Adam Marchick; Jacob Taylor
- Defunct: 2019; 7 years ago
- Headquarters: Redwood City, California, United States
- Products: Push Notifications, In-App Messages, Email

Kahuna Inc. was a software startup that made mobile marketing automation software for companies. It provided tools and services for mobile applications to market their apps through mobile messaging channels, including push notifications, in-app messages, and email. The company was headquartered in Redwood City, California.

Kahuna was founded in 2012 by Adam Marchick and Jacob Taylor, founding CTO of SugarCRM. The company received $2 million in seed funding in October 2013 from SoftTech VC, Costanoa Venture Capital, Chamath Palihapitiya, Tim Kendall, Lee Linden, Raj De Datta, Omar Siddiqui, David Vivero, among others. In February 2014, Kahuna received $11 million in Series A funding from Sequoia Capital and SoftTech VC. In August 2015, Kahuna raised $45 million in a Series B round of funding, led by Tenaya Capital.

In early 2019, the company closed down all operations, and its main website was inaccessible as of May 2019
