= Boaz Kahana =

American psychologist

Boaz Kahana is an American psychologist.

== Education ==
Kahana completed a doctor of philosophy in human development at University of Chicago in 1967.

== Career ==
In 1958, Kahana worked as a summer research psychologist at the Kings County Hospital Center before working there as an intern in clinical psychology through 1959. He was a part-time consulting school psychologist for the Jewish Education Committee in New York City. He was a part-time clinical psychologist for the Brooklyn Association for Rehabilitation of Offenders from 1959 to 1960. From 1959 to 1963, Kahana was a clinical and supervising psychologist at the Kings County Hospital, working under chief psychologist Solomon Machover. Kahana was a part-time clinical psychologist and psychotherapist at the Harbor Light Clinic in Chicago. He was a National Institute of Mental Health predoctoral research fellow from 1964 to 1966. He joined the faculty at Washington University in St. Louis as an assistant professor in the departments of psychology and child psychiatry in 1966, later being promoted to an associate professor. He was the Director of Research at the Child Development Center at Washington University School of Medicine. From 1971 to 1974, Kahana worked as an associate professor at Oakland University. He served as the department of psychology, chair from 1971 to 1976. He was a visiting scholar at the Brookdale Institute from 1977 to 1978. We was promoted to professor in 1974. From 1984 to 1987, Kahana was the a professor and chair of the department of psychology at Cleveland State University (CSU). From 1987 to 1996, he served as the professor of psychology and director of the Center on Applied Gerontological Research at CSU.

=== Research ===
Kahana researches the normal aging and the long-term impacts of trauma. Populations he specializes in are survivors from the attack on Pearl Harbor and Holocaust survivors from three countries.

== Awards and honors ==
Kahana is a Fellow of the Association for Psychological Science and the Gerontological Society of America. The Ohio Research Council on Aging and the Ohio Network of Educational Consultants in the Field of Aging presented Kahana with an Excellence in Gerontological Research Award.

== Personal life ==
Kahana is married to sociologist Eva Kahana. He is a Holocaust survivor.
