= Kahana, Pakistan =

Village in Jhelum, Punjab, Pakistan

Coordinates: 32°29′50″N 72°42′18″E

Kahana is a village near Pind Dadan Khan in the District of Jhelum, Punjab, Pakistan.

== Demographics ==
Kahana is a village of about 2,500 population. Kahana is about 218 meters above sea level and about 175 kilometers away from Islamabad. There are two middle schools for boys and girls. The majority of people have agricultural occupations and a few are government employees. The unemployment rate is about 10% and poverty rate is 2%. Major casts are kahana jutts which are descendents of a person named kah who himself is son of jethal The main aals of jutt kahana are Qazial Spiritual leader in 19th century leading by Qazi Ghulam Rasool and his sun Qazi Muhammad Ameen and Qazi Muhammad Siddiq. There is also a famous Sufi Qazi Muhammad MUSA mazar toward Northern side of Kahana. Other aals arae madhiyal gaushal almal qaimdenal kadiyal and many mores apart from kahana jutts many migrants family lives there some of whom are jutts and some are not like jandran dhela and awans these casts were accomdated by forefathers of kahana jutts and given lands in exchange of their daughters hands to kahana jutts.
