= Eva Kahana =

American sociologist

Eva Kahana is an American sociologist.

== Career ==
Kahana is the Pierce T. and Elizabeth D Robson Professor of Humanities, Chair of the Department of Sociology, and the Director of the Elderly Care Research Center at Case Western Reserve University. She has published over 200 academic articles on Holocaust survivors, aging, and stressors.

== Awards and honors ==
Kahana is a Fellow of the Gerontological Society of America and is the recipient of its Polisher and Distinguished Mentorship awards. She has also received the Mary E. Switzer Distinguished Fellow of the National Institute on Disability, Independent Living, and Rehabilitation Research, the 1977 Distinguished Scholar Award from the Aging and Life Course of the American Sociological Association and Menorah Park's Heller Award. She was in the Cleveland Jewish News 2016 class of 18 difference makers.

== Personal life ==
Kahana is married to psychologist Boaz Kahana. Kahana and her mother are Holocaust survivors who later migrated to the United States. She has two sons. Kahana attends Green Road Synagogue in Cleveland, Ohio.

== Selected works ==
=== Books ===
- Midlarsky, Elizabeth; Kahana, Eva (1994). Altruism in Later Life. SAGE Publications. ISBN 9780803927681.
- Kahana, Jeffrey Steven; Kahana, Eva (2017). Disability and Aging: Learning from Both to Empower the Lives of Older Adults. Lynne Rienner Publishers, Inc. ISBN 978-1-62637-590-1.
