= Kaʻaʻawa, Hawaii =

Census-designated place in the United States

Kaʻaʻawa
- Census-designated place
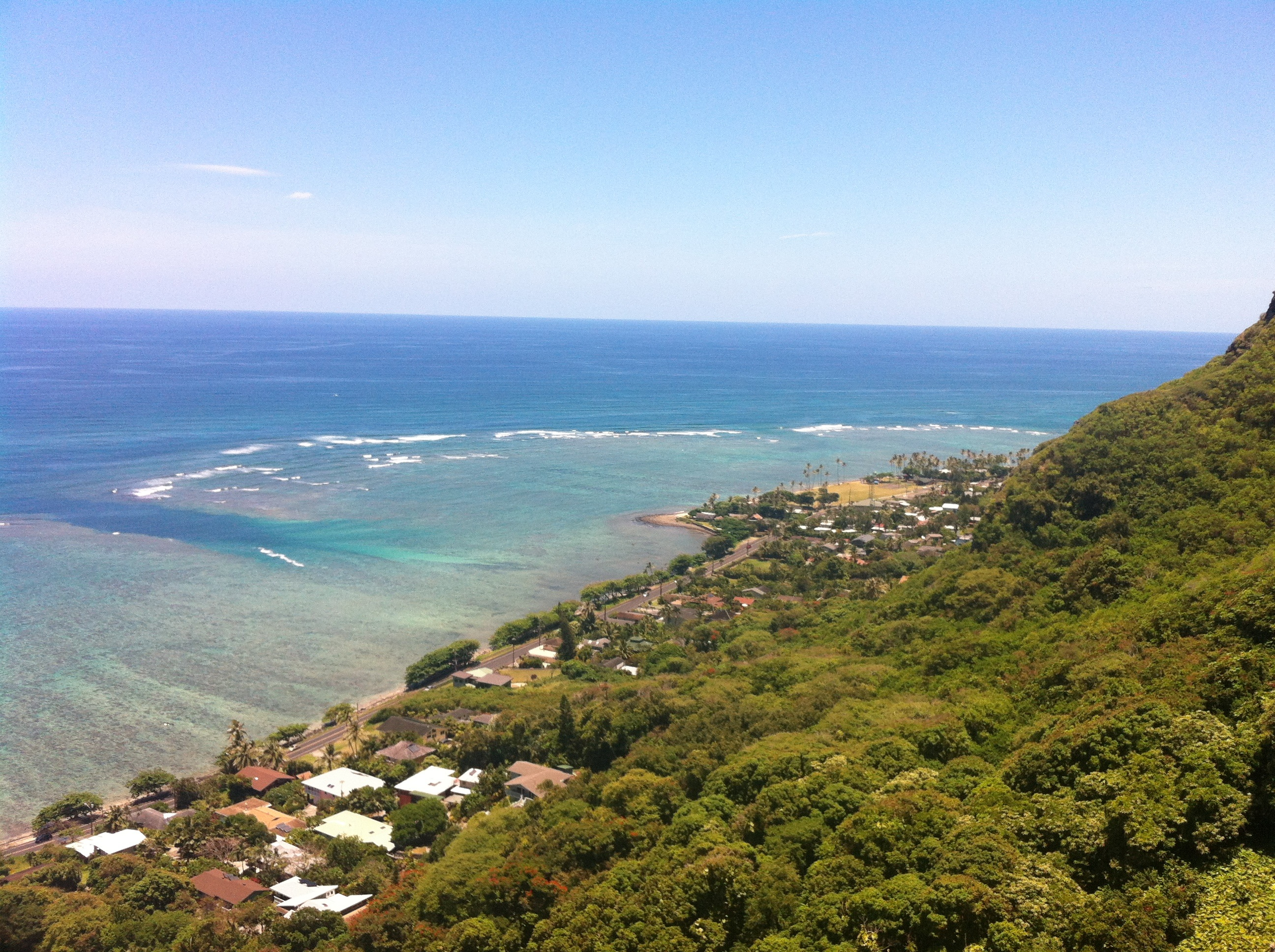
- View from Crouching Lion near Kahana Valley

- Location in Honolulu County and the state of Hawaiʻi
- Coordinates: 21°33′25″N 157°51′19″W
- Country: United States
- State: Hawaiʻi

Area
  - Total: 1.32 sq mi (3.42 km^{2})
  - Land: 0.80 sq mi (2.06 km^{2})
  - Water: 0.53 sq mi (1.36 km^{2})
- Elevation: 6 ft (1.8 m)

Population (2020)
  - Total: 1,421
  - Density: 1,783/sq mi (688.3/km^{2})
- Time zone: UTC-10 (Hawaii-Aleutian)
- ZIP code: 96730
- Area code: 808
- FIPS code: 15-19550
- GNIS feature ID: 0359551

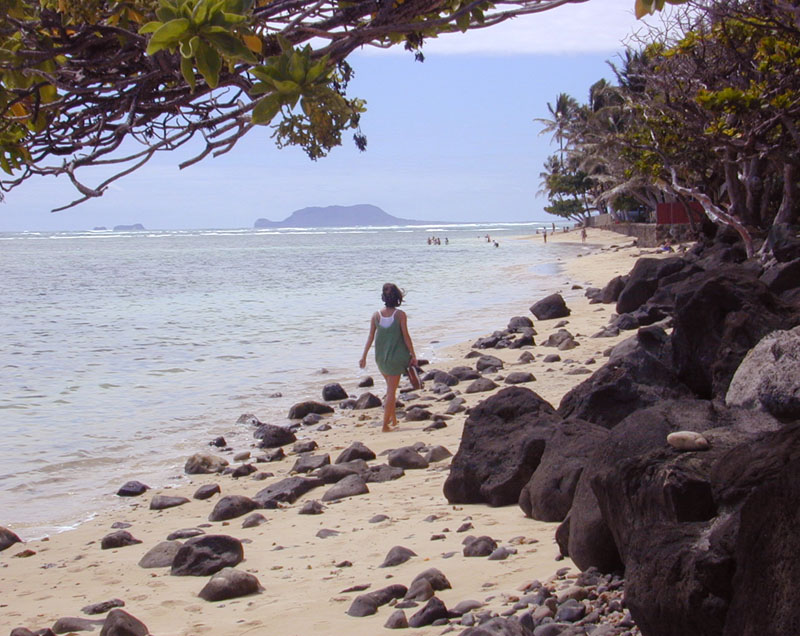
The beach at Kaʻaʻawa

Kaʻaʻawa is a small community and census-designated place (CDP) located in the windward district of Koʻolauloa, City & County of Honolulu on the island of Oʻahu, Hawaiʻi, United States. As of the 2010 Census, the total population for Kaʻaʻawa was 1,379. In Hawaiian, kaʻaʻawa means "the wrasse (fish)". From the Hawaiian spelling Kaʻaʻawa it is seen that each a is pronounced separately and distinctly, set apart by the two ʻokinas: (Hawaiian pronunciation: [ˈkɐʔəˈʔɐvə]).

Kaʻaʻawa is north of Kāneʻohe Bay (north of Kaʻōʻio Point, also Kalaeokaʻōʻio), and the Pacific Ocean shore here is fronted by a broad fringing reef with a narrow, but quite inviting beach (Kanenelu Beach, Kalaeʻōʻio Beach Park, and Kaʻaʻawa Beach Park). The around-the-island-highway (Kamehameha Highway, State Rte. 83) and the houses and other buildings comprising the town are confined to a relatively narrow belt along the coast. However, a long valley extends inland. Kaʻaʻawa Valley is part of Kualoa Ranch and is used for various tourist activities and filming. Major films and TV series incorporating significant views of the valley include George of the Jungle, Jurassic Park, and Lost.

The U.S. postal code for Kaʻaʻawa is 96730.

== Geography ==
Kaʻaʻawa is located at 21°33′25″N 157°51′19″W (21.557050, -157.855148). Kaʻaʻawa is north of Kualoa and directly southeast of Kahana Bay. The next place beyond Kahana is Punaluʻu.

According to the United States Census Bureau, the CDP has a total area of 1.3 square miles (3.4 km^{2}). 0.81 square miles (2.1 km^{2}) of it is land, and 0.54 square miles (1.4 km^{2}) of it is water. The total area is 39.72% water.

== Demographics ==
Historical population
| Census | Pop. | Note | %± |
|---|---|---|---|
| 2020 | 1,421 | | — |
U.S. Decennial Census

As of the 2000 Census, there were 1,324 people, 469 households, and 323 families residing in the Ka'a'awa census tract. The population density was 2,250.6 inhabitants per square mile (869.0/km^{2}). There were 550 housing units at an average density of 934.9 per square mile (361.0/km^{2}). The racial makeup of the CDP was 35.88% White, 0.45% Black or African American, 0.38% Native American, 8.76% Asian, 22.66% Pacific Islander, 1.13% from other races, and 30.74% from two or more races. 8.23% of the population was Hispanic or Latino of any race.

Of the 469 households, 31.1% had children under the age of 18 living with them, 52.5% were married couples living together, 10.4% had a female householder with no husband present, and 31.1% were non-families. 24.3% of households were one person, and 6.2% were one person aged 65 or older. The average household size was 2.82, and the average family size was 3.36.

The age distribution was 26.4% under 18, 7.6% from 18 to 24, 28.9% from 25 to 44, 26.1% from 45 to 64, and 11.0% 65 or older. The median age was 38 years. For every 100 females, there were 97.0 males. For every 100 females age 18 and over, there were 97.6 males.

The median household income was $54,500, and the median family income was $60,156. Males had a median income of $42,500 versus $28,906 for females. The CDP's per capita income was $21,881. 11.8% of the population and 9.0% of families were below the poverty line. Out of the total population, 20.2% of those under the age of 18 and 3.0% of those 65 and older were living below the poverty line.

== Education ==
The Hawaii Department of Education operates the public schools. Kaaawa Elementary School is in the CDP.

== Notable people ==
- Brenton Awa (born 1986 or 1987) – Hawaii Senate member
- Keke Lindgard (born 1994) – fashion model
- Ryan Wesley Routh (born 1966) – suspected attempted assassin of former president and presidential candidate Donald Trump
