= Punaluʻu, Hawaii =

Census-designated place in Hawaii, United States

Punalu'u
- Census-designated place
- Location in Honolulu County and the state of Hawaii
- Coordinates: 21°35′33″N 157°53′49″W
- Country: United States
- State: Hawaii

Area
  - Total: 2.07 sq mi (5.35 km^{2})
  - Land: 1.60 sq mi (4.14 km^{2})
  - Water: 0.47 sq mi (1.21 km^{2})
- Elevation: 6 ft (1.8 m)

Population (2020)
  - Total: 1,374
  - Density: 859.7/sq mi (331.95/km^{2})
- Time zone: UTC-10 (Hawaii-Aleutian)
- ZIP code: 96717
- Area code: 808
- FIPS code: 15-66500
- GNIS feature ID: 1853110

Punaluʻu (pronounced [punəluʔu]) is a census-designated place and rural community in the Koʻolauloa District on the island of Oʻahu, City & County of Honolulu, Hawaii, United States. In Hawaiian, punaluʻu means "coral dived for", or in the case of the fishpond once located here, possibly "spring dived for". There is a very small commercial center located beside Punaluʻu Stream, and several condominium projects, including a high-rise building, located at Haleaha Beach and Kaluanui Beach. At the 2020 census, the CDP had a population of 1,374.

A fringing reef extends off the shoreline. There are several beaches and a beach park in Punaluʻu, including Punaluʻu Beach Park, Punaluʻu Beach, Haleaha Beach, and Kaluanui Beach. Sugar cane was once grown on the narrow coastal plain inland from the highway.

The U.S. postal code for Punaluʻu is 96717.

== Geography ==
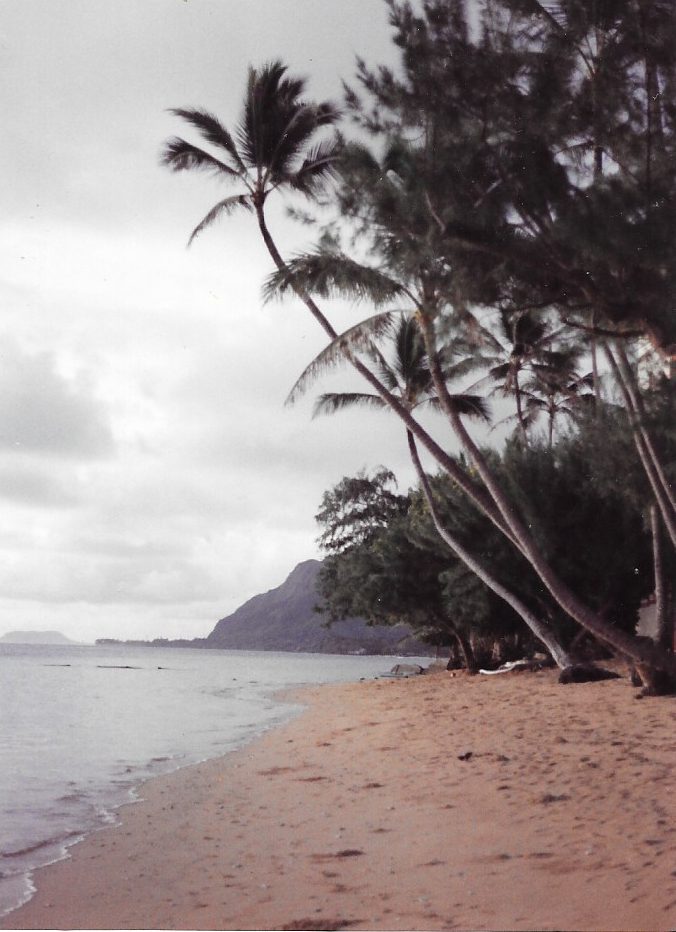
Beach in Punaluu, Oahu in 1996

Punaluu is located at 21°35'33" North, 157°53'49" West (21.592600, -157.896989). According to the U.S. Census Bureau, the CDP has a total area of 2.1 square miles (5.4 km^{2}), of which 1.6 square miles (4.1 km^{2}) is land and 0.46 square miles (1.2 km^{2}), or 22.97%, is water. The town is north of Kahana Bay and Kaʻaʻawa and south of Hauʻula along Kamehameha Highway (State Rte. 83). Kaluanui Stream and Sacred Falls are located between Punaluʻu and Hauʻula.

== Demographics ==
Historical population
Census	Pop.	Note	%±
2020	1,374		—
U.S. Decennial Census

As of the census of 2000, there were 881 people, 305 households, and 196 families residing in the CDP. The population density was 1,106.0 inhabitants per square mile (427.0/km^{2}). There were 439 housing units at an average density of 551.1 per square mile (212.8/km^{2}). The racial makeup of the CDP was 32.69% White, 0.57% Black or African American, 0.23% Native American, 10.22% Asian, 24.06% Pacific Islander, 0.23% from other races, and 32.01% from two or more races. 6.02% of the population were Hispanic or Latino of any race.

There were 305 households, out of which 34.1% had children under the age of 18 living with them, 44.3% were married couples living together, 13.4% had a female householder with no husband present, and 35.7% were non-families. 29.8% of all households were made up of individuals, and 5.2% had someone living alone who was 65 years of age or older. The average household size was 2.66 and the average family size was 3.32.

In the CDP the population was spread out, with 26.0% under the age of 18, 8.7% from 18 to 24, 24.3% from 25 to 44, 25.0% from 45 to 64, and 16.0% who were 65 years of age or older. The median age was 38 years. For every 100 females, there were 94.5 males. For every 100 females age 18 and over, there were 88.4 males.

The median income for a household in the CDP was $32,143, and the median income for a family was $32,500. Males had a median income of $32,188 versus $21,719 for females. The per capita income for the CDP was $19,067. About 15.8% of families and 19.9% of the population were below the poverty line, including 24.5% of those under the age of 18 and 0.8% of those ages 65 and older.
