= AFN Iraq =

American Forces Network of radio stations in Iraq

AFN Iraq was the American Forces Network of radio stations within Iraq. The network, nicknamed Freedom Radio, broadcast news, information, and entertainment programs, including adult contemporary music. Its mission was to "sustain and improve the morale and readiness" of U.S. forces in Iraq.

The first song played live on AFN was "Freedom" by Paul McCartney.

== FM Transmitters ==
The network includes the following transmitter sites and their power, if known (status as of October 2008):

- 93.3 MHz
  - Baghdad (FOB Union III) — Transmitter Under Construction
  - Fallujah (Camp Baharia)
  - Al Taqaddum Airbase (TQ)
- 101.1 MHz
  - Tikrit (COB Speicher)
- 104.5 MHz
  - Baquba (FOB Warhorse) — Transmitter Under Construction
- 105.1 MHz
  - Mosul (Camp Diamondback/FOB Marez) — 1 kW
- 107.3 MHz
  - Al Asad Airbase
  - Balad (LSA Anaconda) — 250 W
  - Nasiriyah (Tallil Air Base) — 200 W
  - Qayyarah West Airfield (Q-WEST) — 250 W
  - Ramadi (FOB Blue Diamond)
  - Samarra (FOB Brassfield-Mora)
  - Camp Taji
  - Tall Afar (FOB Sykes)
  - Umm Qasr (Camp Bucca)
- 107.7 MHz
  - Baghdad (Camp Slayer) — 1 kW

== History ==
The 222nd Broadcast Operations Detachment, a United States Army Reserve unit, from Los Angeles, California took control of AFN Radio & Television in August 2003. The 222nd Broadcast Operations Detachment was relieved by the 209th Broadcast Operations Detachment (USAR) from Rome, Georgia, in August 2004. In August 2005 the 206th Broadcast Operations Detachment (USAR), from Dallas, Texas relieved the 209th Broadcast Operations Detachment. In August 2006 the 356th Operations Detachment (USAR), from Ft. Meade, Maryland, relieved the 206th Broadcast Operations Detachment. In August 2007, the US Air Force assumed control of AFN Iraq until February 2009. In March 2009, the 222nd Broadcast Operations Detachment (USAR), from Los Angeles, Calif. assumed control of the station. In March 2010, the 209th Broadcast Operations Detachment (USAR) from Rome, Georgia again assumed command of AFN-I. 2004- T-shirts sold through area AAFES outlets, depicted CH46 helicopters flying over a herd of camels, on a dark blue heavy weight 100% cotton T. "More 'Raq, less Taq" was the wording. A very popular item at the time.

== Television ==
Freedom Journal Iraq was produced by the electronic news gathering (ENG) team of the American Forces Network-Iraq, five times a week until 2009. The 10-minute newscast was produced Monday through Friday and uploaded via satellite to the Pentagon Channel in Washington D.C. Originally, the program was produced weekly.

The newscast was awarded 1st and 2nd place Keith L. Ware Broadcast Journalism Awards in 2005 for best Army Television Newscast while being produced by the 206th Broadcast Operations Detachment.

Broadcast journalists have traveled the entire theater of operations in support of Freedom Journal Iraq, from Kuwait to Turkey. Although not designated combat camera correspondents, a few broadcast journalists have been awarded the Combat Action Badge for their duty serving at American Forces Network-Iraq.

Freestyle Iraq is produced by AFN-Iraq. Created by members of the 222nd BOD, Freestyle Iraq is a production that highlights service members in their "off" time. The show won 2nd place in the 2010 Keith L. Ware awards.

The 206th BOD resumed control of AFN Iraq in December 2010. The 206th was the last unit to man the TV-radio station. September 30, 2011, was the last day on the air for Freedom Radio. The last song played was "Courtesy of the Red, White, & Blue (The Angry American)" by country singer Toby Keith, and the last piece of audio ever heard on the station was Porky Pig's famous "That's all Folks!" exclamation.
