= PAOC =

PAOC is an acronym for:

- Pan-African Ornithological Congress
- Pentecostal Assemblies of Canada
- Public Affairs Operations Center
