= Amphibious Construction Battalion 2 =

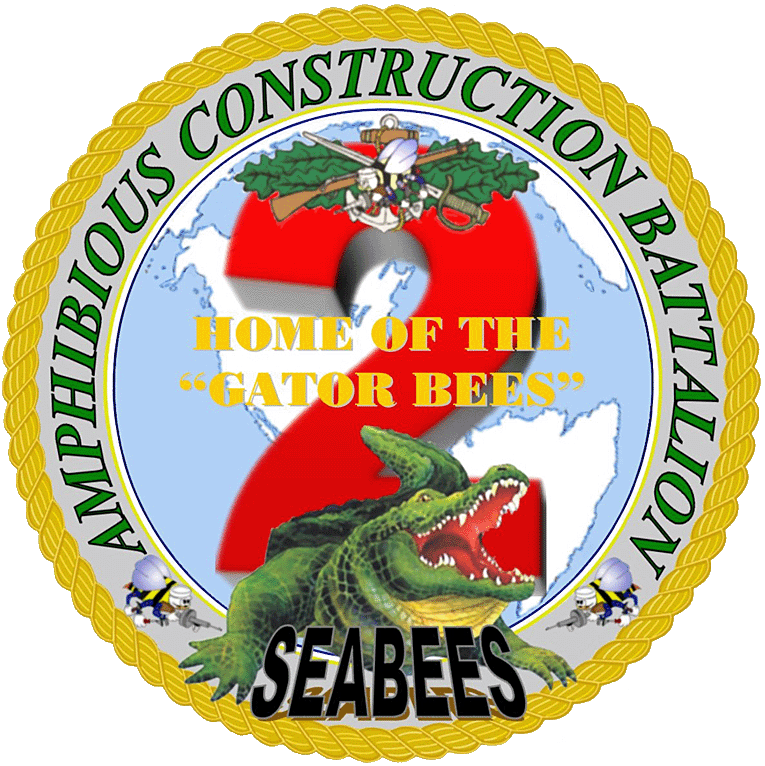
- ACB-2 Insignia
- Active: 1942 – 31 March 2023
- Country: United States
- Branch: USN
- Garrison/HQ: JEB Little Creek
- Mottos: "Can Do" "We Build – We Fight"
- Engagements: World War II; Korean War; Vietnam War; Operation Desert Storm; Operation Iraqi Freedom; Operation Unified Response

Commanders
- Current commander: Captain Atiim Senthill

Amphibious Construction Battalion TWO (abbreviated as ACB 2, or PHIBCB 2) was an amphibious construction battalion in the United States Navy based in Little Creek, Virginia. ACB 2 was decommissioned on 31 March 2023.

Amphibious Construction Battalion ONE is its sister unit based in Coronado, California.

== Mission ==
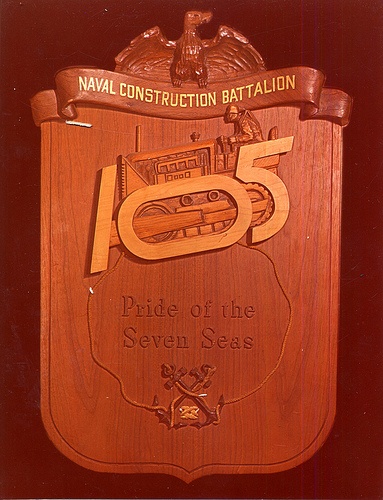
105th NCB Unit insignia. The original version had "The First in the Philippines" in the center. (Seabee Museum)

PHIBCB TWO combined the small craft expertise of the surface navy with the construction capabilities of the Naval Construction Force. ACB 2 supported Commander, Naval Beach Group Two in amphibious force projection with fully trained, combat ready forces.

== History ==
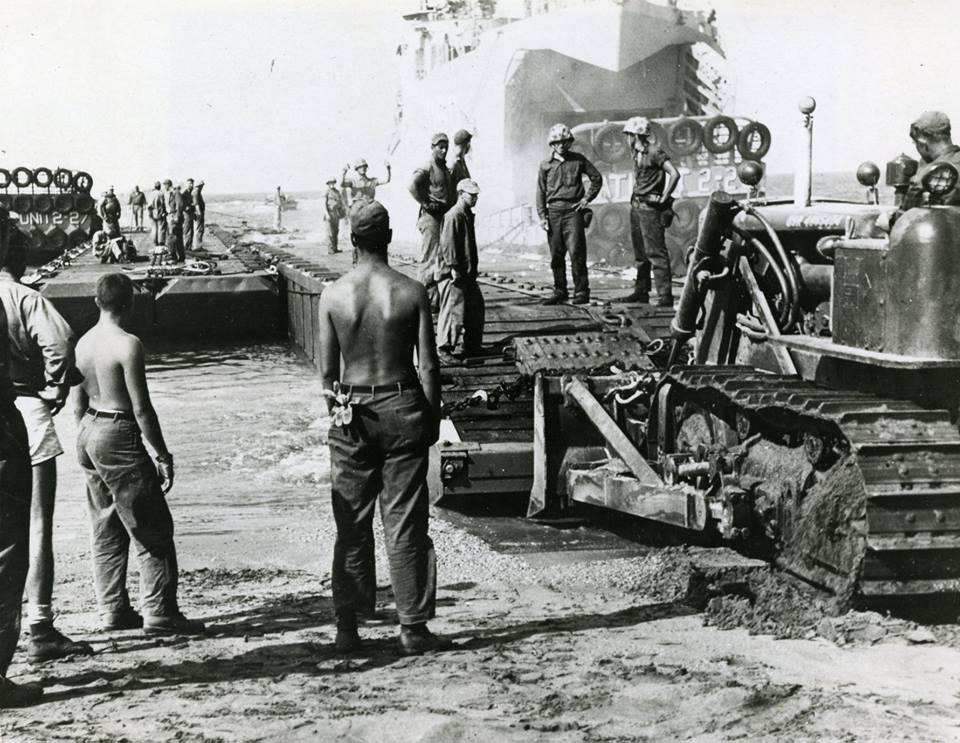
On 15 July 1958, Amphibious Construction Battalion TWO (PHIBTWO) assist Marines with landing at Beirut, Lebanon. Seabees with PHIBTWO supplied causeway teams to provide pontoons for troops, vehicles and supplies to pass to and from LCUs.(Seabee Museum)

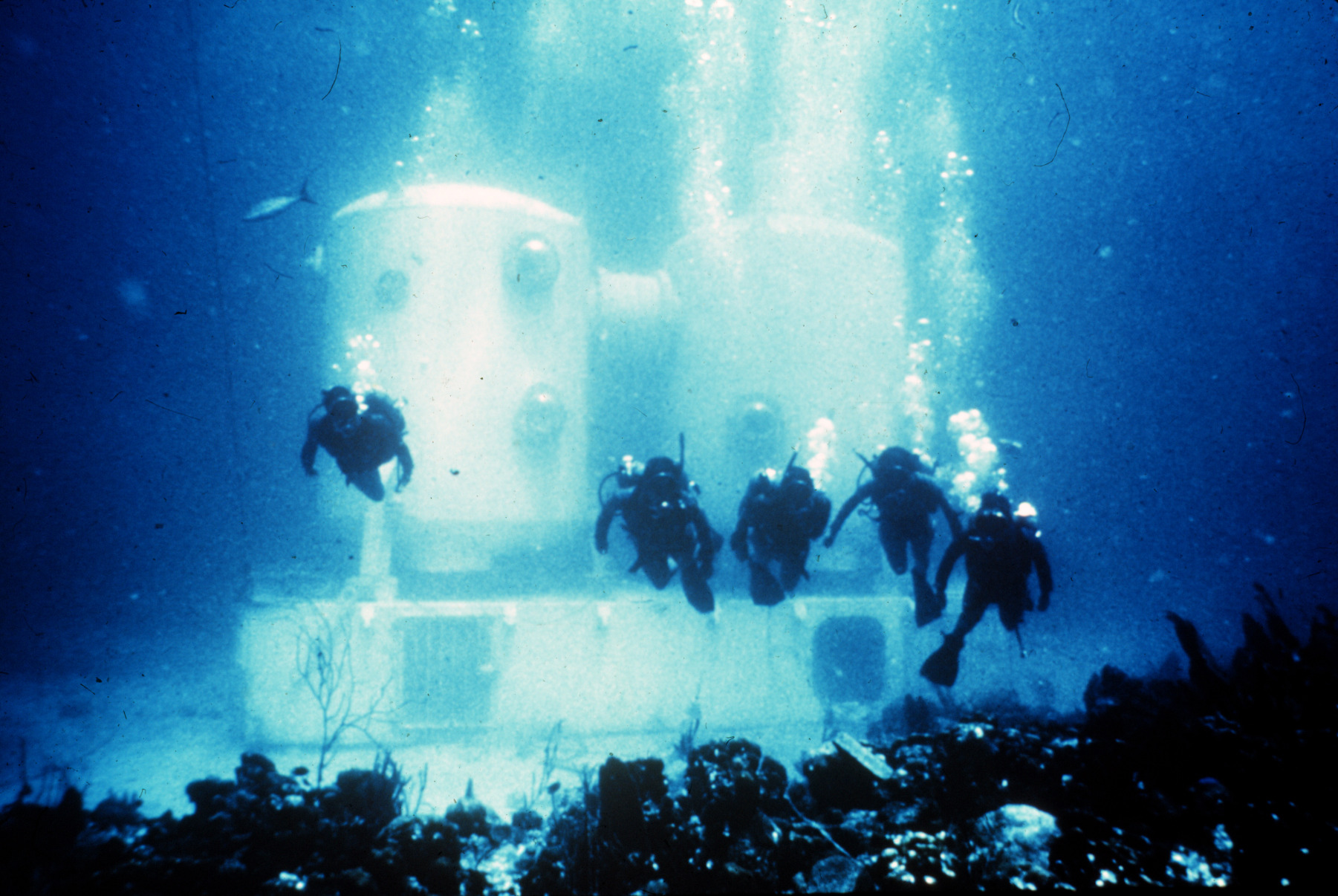
Tektite I assembled by ACB 2 during 1969. (NURP)

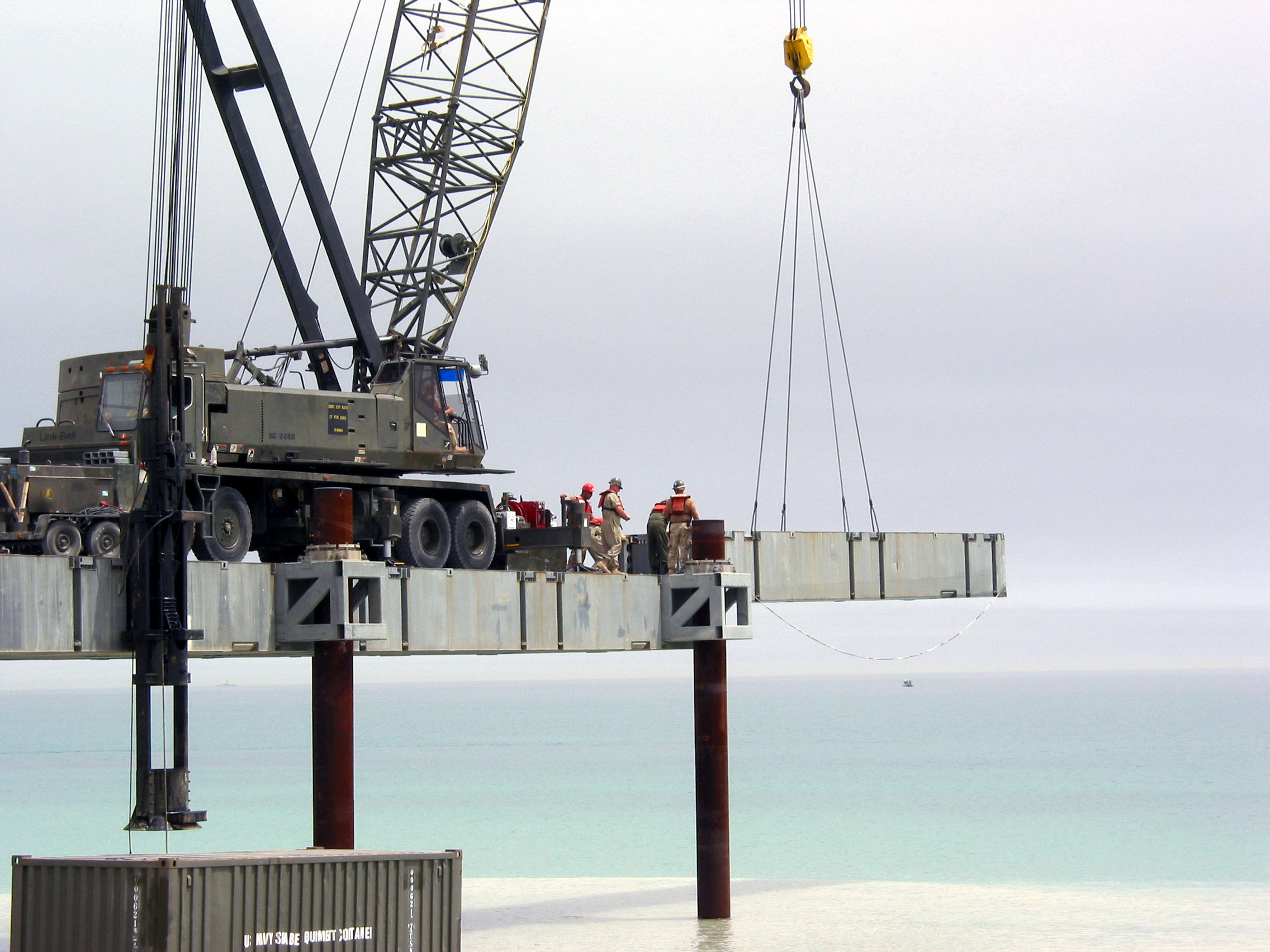
US Navy 030404-N-1050K-023U.S. Seabees from ACBs 1 and 2 place a deck section in the assembly of the Elevated Causeway System-Modular (ELCAS (M)) at Camp Patriot, Kuwait (4 Apr 2003). It was the first time the ELCAS/M (length 1,400-feet) was assembled in a combat operation.

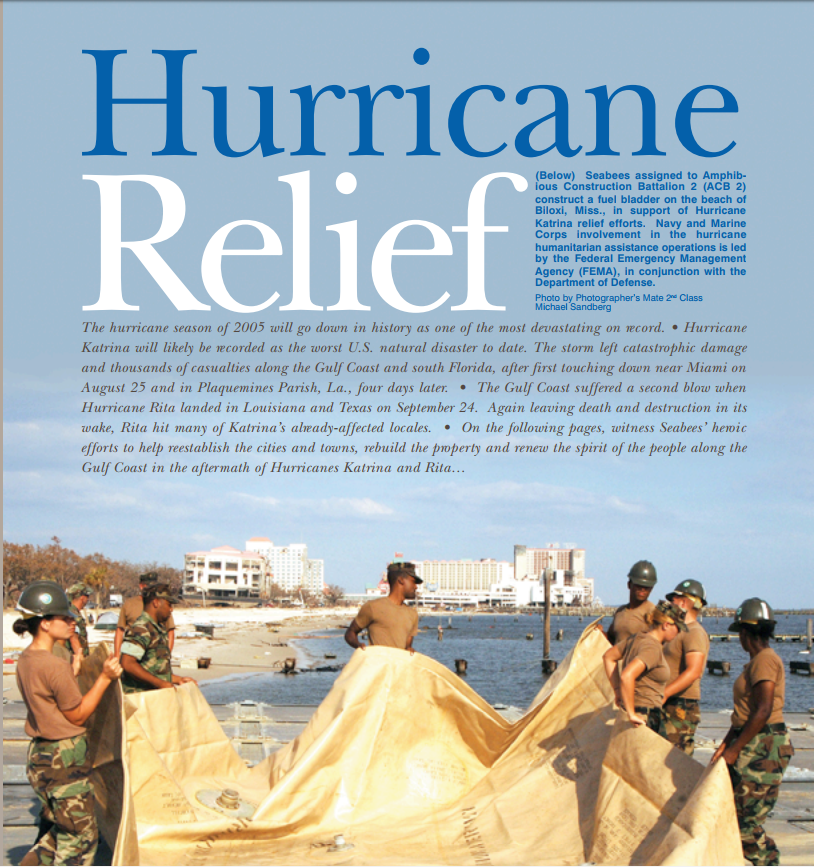
US Navy 050904-N-7638K-035 Vehicles and equipment assigned to ACB-2 on the beach at Biloxi, Miss. in the 2005 relief effort to Hurricane Katrina

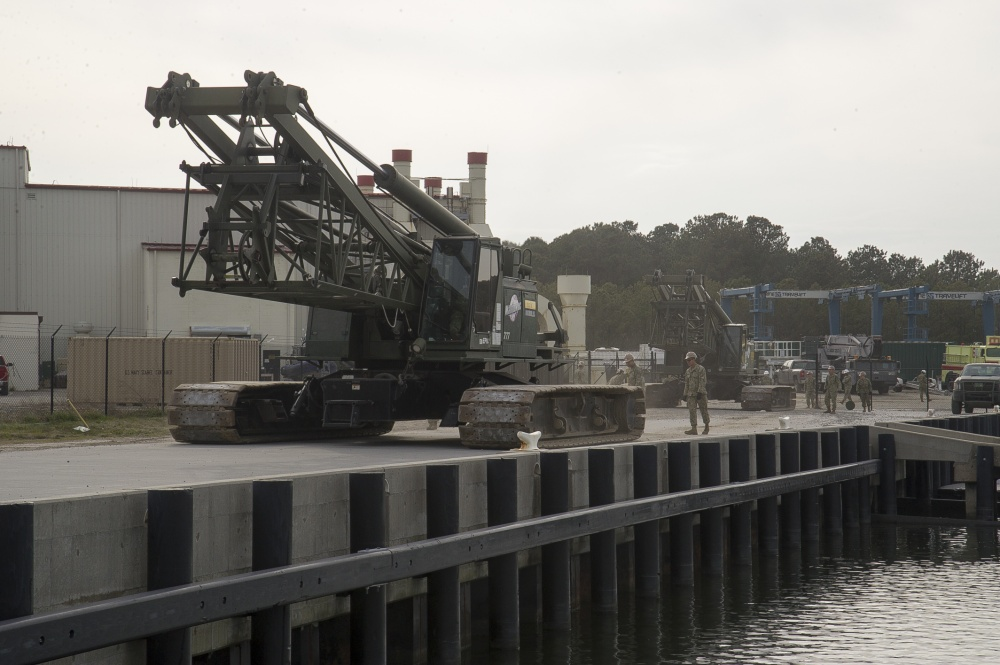
ACB 2's two 777 Manitowoc cranes are the largest in the US military with a 200-ton lifting capacity at JOINT EXPEDITIONARY BASE LITTLE CREEK, VA. in 2018. (USN)

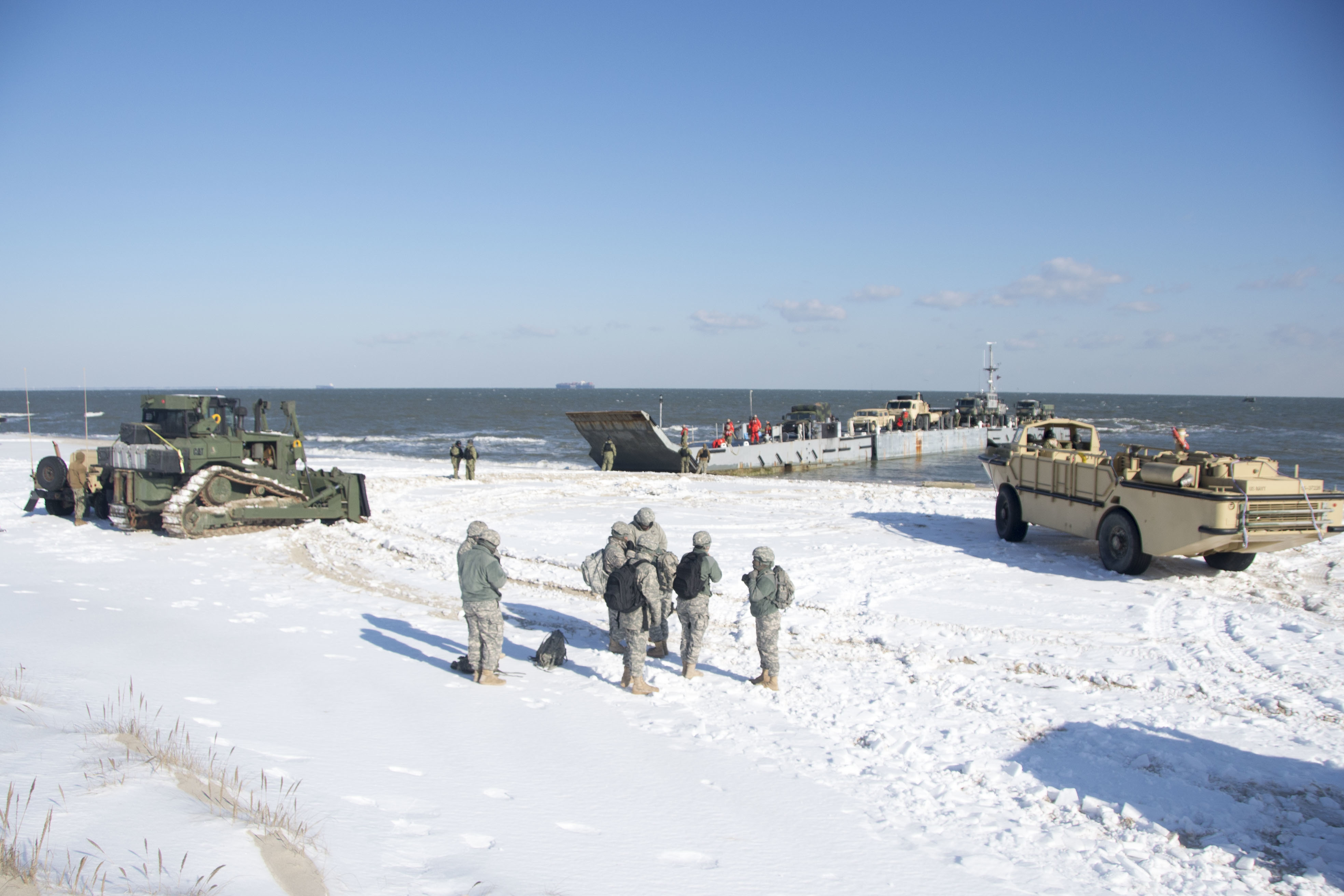
Amphibious Construction Battalion 2 and Beachmaster Unit Two conduct Logistics over the shore exercises.

ACB 2 has its beginnings in World War II. It started out as the 105th Naval Construction Battalion. She was commissioned 24 July 1943 at Camp Peary. From there she was sent to Camp Parks, in California, and then to Advance Base Depot Port Hueneme. While there the battalion became part of movie history by providing the men and equipment for staging portions of the filming of The Fighting Seabees. At Port Hueneme the 105th boarded the United States Army Transport Sea Devil bound for New Guinea via Townsville, Australia. There, she would join the 7th Fleet at Naval Base Milne Bay, Milne Bay and her sister battalion the 104th. At Milne, the primary tasks were the construction of an Amphibious Training Center, the battalion's camp, a Liberty ship pier, and a tank farm on Swinger Bay (adjacent the Coral Sea). The Seabee's historian William Huie states that if all the warehouses built by the 105th at Milne were combined it would create a structure 40' x 75,000' (15 miles). The battalion also assisted the Army with the construction of Turnbull Field on Stringer bay.

The battalion also had several detachments. One went to Hilimoi Bay to help the 91st CB build a hospital for shipment to a forward site. Another 150 men built a second sawmill to augment the one being run by the 84th CB at Milne Bay. Of note are two 105 specialized details of divers that traveled over a hundred miles on undisclosed missions. Milne Bay is one of the most malaria infested regions of the world and the 105th was there from January to October 1944. That month, several LSTs arrived to embark the battalion for Island "X". En route they laid up a few days at Hollandia. On 24 October 1944, or D-plus 4, the battalion landed at Tacloban, Leyte. The 105th was the first entire Seabee Battalion to land in the Philippines. Also landing at Tacloban were the 75th CB and the 1024 CBD (they all were part of the 12th Construction Regiment). The 104th would be sent there too. The following day, 400 men were sent to Anabong Point. 12 November saw the rear echelon arrive at San Pedro Bay, Leyte, from Milne Bay. On that same day, the OIC at Anabong Point sent a detachment to San Antonio, Northern Samar. Before the war was over there would be additional detachments sent to Talosa, Guiuan, Balingaga, and Osmena. The 105th's cruisebook states "the 105th is a battalion distinguished only by its normalcy." In the Philippines, she built an airfield, roads, barracks, camps and water tanks. During the first 31 days she came under air attack 138 times. On V-J Day, there were 32,000 Seabees in Subic Bay including those in the 105th. The battalion made itself a reputation known as far back as Australia for "moonlight acquisition" activities.

During WWII there were five battalions tasked with pontoons, barges and the building of ship to shore causeways: CBs 70, 81, 111, 128, and 302. The 105th Naval Construction Battalion was recommissioned 22 January 1947 at Little Creek, Virginia, and was placed under the operational control of Commander, Amphibious Training Command, U.S. Atlantic Fleet. At this time, the battalion "absorbed the duties and materials of the old Pontoon Training Unit of COMPHIBTRALANT". When Naval Beach Group Two was established in 1948, the 105th NCB became a component of that command. In October 1949, the 1st NCB was recommissioned at Little Creek also. The Navy changed CB designations that year and they both became Mobile Construction Battalions MCBs. This lasted less than a year for the 105th because the battalion was re-designated Amphibious Construction Battalion 2 (PHIBCB 2) in 1950. By the time the Korean War broke out the Naval Construction force had been reduced to 2,800 men, MCB 1, ACB 1, and ACB 2. That quickly changed by December as the force was rapidly expanded.

From 1972 to 1975, ACB 2 was a component of Naval Inshore Warfare Command following the decommissioning of Naval Beach Group 2. However, ACB 2 once again became a component of Naval Beach Group 2 when it was recommissioned in 1975.

Since World War II, ACB 2 has distinguished itself in multiple operations including:

- "Passage to Freedom" Task Force 90 The 1954 Geneva agreement recognizing the Communist government of North Vietnam allowed for people residing in the North to move south before 15 May 1955. Both ACBs were assigned to TF-90.
- Operation Blue Bat – 1958 Lebanon crisis
- Multinational Force in Lebanon August 1982 to February 1984
- Operation Urgent Fury October 1983 Grenada
- Operation Sharp Edge in Liberia in 1991
- Operations Desert Shield and Desert Storm in 1990–1991
- Operation Uphold Democracy in Haiti in 1994
- TWA Flight 800 and EgyptAir Flight 990 disaster recovery efforts
- Joint Task Force Katrina 2005
- Operation Iraqi Freedom
- Operation Unified Response 2010 Haiti earthquake.

== Tektite I ==
On 28 January 1969 a detachment from Amphibious Construction Battalion 2 augmented by an additional 17 Seabee divers from both the Atlantic and Pacific fleets as well as the 21st NCR began the installation of the Tektite habitat in Great Lameshur Bay at Lameshur, U.S. Virgin Islands. The Tektite program was funded by NASA and was the first scientists-in-the-sea program sponsored by the U.S. government. The Seabees also constructed a 12 hut base camp at Viers that is used today as the Virgin Islands Environmental Resource Station.

== Unit awards ==
ACB 2 has received several unit citations and commendations. Members who participated in actions that merited the award are authorized to wear the medal or ribbon associated with the award on their uniform. Awards and decorations of the United States Armed Forces have different categories, i.e. Service, Campaign, Unit, and Personal. Unit Citations are distinct from the other decorations. The following unit awards are 2's: ACB 2 was the first CB awarded the Joint Meritorious Unit Award. Also receiving the award were 100 men from ACB 1 that were attached to ACB 2 at that time.

- Joint Meritorious Unit Award 1986
- Navy Unit Commendation
- Navy Unit Commendation
- Navy Meritorious Unit Commendation
- Navy Meritorious Unit Commendation

Campaign and Service Awards

- Asiatic–Pacific Campaign Medal with one bronze star (105 NCB)
- Philippine Liberation Medal with two bronze stars (105 NCB)
- World War II Victory Medal (105 NCB)
- National Defense Service Medal Vietnam
- Humanitarian Service Medal Feb–Mar 1976 1976 Guatemala earthquake
- Humanitarian Service Medal – ACB-2 Det, Evacuation of Beirut 1976
- Armed Forces Expeditionary Medal – ACB-Det, Invasion of Grenada 1983
- National Defense Service Medal War on Terror
- Southwest Asia Service Medal

The Battalion also qualified for the Golden Anchor Award for retention excellence in FY 01 and FY 03.

With over 1,100 active duty and reserve men and women, Amphibious Construction Battalion TWO provided the U.S. Atlantic Fleet with the ship-to-shore link in amphibious operations.

== See also ==
- Admiral Ben Moreell
- Amphibious Construction Battalion 1 (ACB-1)
- Civil Engineer Corps United States Navy
- Naval Construction Battalion aka Seabee
- Naval Mobile Construction Battalion 1
- Naval Mobile Construction Battalion 3
- Naval Mobile Construction Battalion 4
- Naval Mobile Construction Battalion 5
- Naval Mobile Construction Battalion 11
- Naval Mobile Construction Battalion 25
- Naval Mobile Construction Battalion 133
- Naval Construction Battalion Center (Gulfport, Mississippi)
- Naval Construction Battalion Center Port Hueneme
- Naval Amphibious Base Little Creek
- Naval Amphibious Base Coronado
- Seabees in World War II
- Seabees Memorial
