= Naval Beach Group Two =

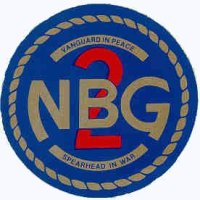
- NBG-2 insignia
- Active: 19 July 1948 - Present
- Country: United States
- Branch: United States Navy
- Role: Amphibious warfare
- Garrison/HQ: Naval Amphibious Base Little Creek, Virginia Beach, Virginia
- Motto(s): "Vanguard in Peace, Spearhead in War"
- Engagements: Operation Blue Bat; Gulf War; Iraq War

Commanders
- Current commander: Captain David Rowland

Naval Beach Group Two, (NBG-2) is a United States Navy amphibious unit based at Naval Amphibious Base Little Creek, Virginia Beach, Virginia. Naval Beach Group One is its sister unit based in Naval Amphibious Base Coronado in Coronado, California.

== Mission ==
Since its inception 19 July 1948, Naval Beach Group TWO (NBG-2) and its component commands have participated in a variety of amphibious operations.

Commander, Naval Beach Group TWO (CNBG-2) functions under two distinct missions. During amphibious assaults, they provide personnel to support and operate causeway lighterage, LCACs, LCUs, buoyant ship-to-shore bulk fuel systems, beach traffic control, and beach salvage equipment. The second mission is under the Maritime Preposition Force (MPF) concept which uses the equipment and supplies prepositioned on board forward deployed Maritime Prepositioning ships (MPS). Joining forces with the Marine Expeditionary Brigade (MEB), CNBG-2 forms and commands the Naval Support Element (NSE) and is airlifted into an objective area to establish camp support, conduct ship-to-shore movement, beach party operations and debarkation operations in support of the offload of each MPF ship.

CNBG-2 is also responsible for conducting Amphibious Specialty Training (PHIBSPECTRA) for all US Atlantic Fleet amphibious ships. The PHIBSPECTRA Team provides in-depth training in well deck operations to prepare Expeditionary Strike Group (ESG) ships for deployment to the Atlantic and Indian Oceans.

== Units ==
The initial NBG-2 consisted of Headquarters Unit, Boat Unit TWO, which became Assault Craft Unit ONE, Amphibious Construction Battalion TWO, and Underwater Demolition Team TWO, which eventually shifted to the control of Naval Special Warfare Command. Additions to the organization have been Beachmaster Unit Two (BMU-2) in 1949, Assault Craft Unit FOUR (ACU-4) in 1987. With the addition of ACU-4 came the ability to conduct over-the-horizon assaults using the swift Landing Craft Air Cushion vehicles.

== History ==
The need for a single organization dedicated to the support of amphibious operations was recognized as a result of experience gained during the island-hopping campaigns of World War II. The decision to consolidate amphibious assault assets led to the establishment of NBG-2 in July 1948.

=== Lebanon Crisis 1958 ===
Over the years, NBG-2 has deployed teams and headquarters for numerous amphibious exercises and contingency operations. Two Beach Party Teams and a Group Headquarters landed and conducted operations on the beaches of Beirut during the Lebanon Crisis in 1958. The Largest and most extensive amphibious operation to take place between the Korean and Vietnam war were the landings at Lebanon. "Operation Blue Bat" lasted 102 days from 15 July to 25 October, and involved the US 6th Fleet with over 70 ships and 40,000 sailors, as well as 14,357 ground troops. The Composite Air Strike Force of Naval carrier aircraft as well as US Air Force planes from the 322d Airlift Division provided air support. The operation included some 8,509 Army soldiers from the Army Task Force 201 and the 24th Airborne Brigade, built around the 1st Reinforced Airborne Battle Group from West Germany. And some 5,842 Marines that landed on the beach came from the 2nd Provisional Marine Force, 2nd Marine Division.

The bulk fuel element provided the sole means of fuel supply for Santo Domingo during that period.

=== Disestablishment and recommissioning ===
In January 1973, NBG-2 staff was disestablished and all functions were assigned to Commander Amphibious Operations Support Command, US Atlantic Fleet. This gap was short-lived however, and Naval Beach Group Two was recommissioned on 1 July 1975. This reenergized Naval Beach Group included not only the traditional units (BMU-2, PHIBCB-2 and ACU-2), but also the Navy Cargo Handling and Port Group (NAVCHAPGRU), the only unit of combat stevedores in the US Navy. The NAVCHAPGRU's mission is to offload merchant ships in support of amphibious operations. Since then, NBG-2 detachments have had a key role in disaster relief operations in Guatemala, evacuations of US citizens in Antarctica, and the Indian Ocean.

=== Civilian services ===
NBG-2 has been involved in some unique operations close to home, providing ferry services from Little Creek to Cape Charles, Virginia, during those periods in 1970 and 1972 when the Chesapeake Bay Bridge was out of commission. In the winter of 1977, NBG-2 augmented by Harbor Guard in removing navigational aids damaged by severe icing conditions in inland waters.

=== JLOTS testing ===
The entire NBG-2 deployed to Fort Story, Virginia, during the month of August 1977, and conducted around-the-clock container and barge handling operations in support of the Joint Army/Navy/Marine Corps Logistics Over the Shore (JLOTS) test and evaluation program. The major Navy asset developed during the JLOTS testing was the Elevated Causeway System (ELCAS) which added a new dimension in flexibility and sustainability of logistics support in amphibious operations.

=== 1980s ===
During May and June 1980, units of NBG-2 participated with ships of Amphibious Group TWO in the Cuban Refugee Humanitarian Assistance Operations in the Straits of Florida; and from 1982 to 1984, in support of multi-national forces in Beirut, Lebanon, and Operation Urgent Fury the invasion of Grenada.

NBG-2 expanded its mission capabilities in 1985, when it was tasked to support the Maritime Prepositioning ship (MPS) Program. Maritime Prepositioning Force (MPF) operations require NBG-2 to provide a Naval Support Element (NSE) to offload equipment and supplies for Marine Air-Ground Task Forces (MAGTF) ashore. The material is prepositioned aboard forward-deployed MPS ships, and the NSE and Marine Corps personnel are flown into the objective area to move the equipment and conduct combat operations ashore. NBG-2 has conducted major MPF exercises including Bold Eagle 88, Solid Shield 89, and Ahuas Tara 90, in Honduras.

In 1987, Assault Craft Unit FOUR (ACU-4) joined the Naval Beach Group and with the Landing Craft Air Cushion (LCAC), a new over-the-horizon (OTH) capability was added to the Groups’ mission.

=== 1990s ===
NBG-2 Detachments, composed of elements from the four subordinate commands, regularly embark aboard the ships of amphibious ready groups (ARGs) deployed to the Mediterranean Sea, the Indian Ocean, the Adriatic Sea, and throughout the Atlantic area from the coasts of Norway to South America to include the Caribbean Sea. From August 1990 through April 1991, detachments provided crucial support to amphibious forces for Liberia, Operation Sharp Edge; and Operations Desert Shield and Desert Storm in the war against Iraq.

From January to March 1991, approximately 800 active duty and US Naval Reserve personnel from NBG-2, its subordinate units, Navy Cargo Handling and Port Group, and Underwater Construction Team ONE deployed to the Persian Gulf as the MPF NSE in support of Operation Desert Storm. 100 Seabees of Amphibious Construction Battalion 2 departed Norfolk, Virginia, on amphibious ships bound for the Persian Gulf. While in the gulf these Seabees participated in numerous exercises with the Marines to prepare for an amphibious assault in the region. NBG-2 efforts directly contributed to the quick end of the conflict and were recognized by the awarding of the Navy Unit Commendation, the Southwest Asia Service Medal, and the Kuwait Liberation Medal (Saudi Arabia). Following the conflict, a NBG-2 Detachment remained behind in Jubail, Saudi Arabia, to assist in the backload and reconfiguration of MPF ships.

In August/September 1991, NBG-2 units participated in JLOTS III technology demonstrations off Fort Story, Virginia. Tests included conducting an actual cargo offload via LCAC and the Air Cushioned Vehicle Landing Platform (ACVLP). The Stern Adapter Unit (SAU) was installed on a Self-Propelled Causeway (CSP) and tested by flexing in to both the Navy and Army Roll-on/Roll-off Discharge Facilities (RRDFs) positioned at the head of the Elevated Causeway (ELCAS) System, up onto the ELCAS for rapid discharge of vehicles. This exercise also marked the first time ELCAS was deployed on a Seabee vessel and erected in-stream. The Seabee load-out included two LCU-1610s, four Side Loadable Warping Tugs (SLWTs), and the entire ELCAS System.

An NBG-2 Detachment in Pensacola was diverted from routine training operations in November 1991, to assist in the Haitian relief effort at Guantanamo Bay, Cuba. A detachment remained on-station to the end of 1991.

Throughout 1992, COMNAVBEACHGRU TWO and its units conducted routine training evolutions in support of MPF/JLOTS operations. During May, COMNAVBEACHGRU TWO units, as well as COMPHIBRON TWO, II MEF, and MPSRON ONE participated in Ocean Venture 92 Phase I, an MPF exercise conducted by USCINCLANT. Participants planned and executed MPF operations across Onslow Beach at Camp Lejeune, North Carolina. NBG-2, NAVCHAPGRU-2, II MEF, and NMCB-2 personnel offloaded equipment in support of ground operations. From July to September of that year, NAVBEACHGRU TWO participated in Ocean Venture 92 Phase II, a USCINCLANT directed joint exercise to test and evaluate the Offshore Petroleum Discharge System (OPDS). Testing was conducted offshore at Eglin AFB, Florida in support of the JLOTS III Joint Test and Evaluation Directorate. An average of 1,100 US gal (4,200 L; 920 imp gal) of fuel per minute, 10% greater than the operational requirements was pumped ashore. More than 2,400,000 US gal (9,100,000 L; 2,000,000 imp gal) of fuel was received by the Army Inland Petroleum Distribution System (IPDS) and the Marine Corps Amphibious Assault Fuel System (AAFS), with no fuel spills and involving the pumping of fuel from sea to shore, and was conduced environmentally safe. During September 1992, COMNAVBEACHGRU TWO units participated in the Hurricane Andrew Disaster Relief Efforts.

Routine exercises and deployments continued throughout 1993, 1994, and 1995. Ocean Venture 1993 Phase I (MPF) was conducted at Roosevelt Roads, Puerto Rico in May 1993; followed by Phase II (JLOTS) in June at Onslow Bay, Camp Lejeune, North Carolina. In 1995, NBG-2 saw the relocation and home porting of the COMPSRON ONE staff and PMSRON ONE ships to the SIXTHFLT AOR. Exercise Fuertas Defensas 95, in spite of a robust hurricane season and adverse weather conditions was conducted at Fort Story, Virginia, with great success. With the relocation of MPSRON ONE to the MED AOR.

The year 1996, saw three major exercises and Naval Support Element Trainings, in addition to real world contingency TWA Flight 800 salvage operations.

Two major exercises and in-theater Naval Support Element Training, in addition to another real world contingency to off load the motor vessel BOBO in Rota, Spain, was accomplished in 1997. NBG-2 saw the first-ever on load and offload of the ELCAS (M) on a T-ACS and the upload and download of Beach Group craft on a Seabee ship.

The year 1998 continued to be a banner one as Beach Group TWO conducted the remainder of the backload of the BOBO and contributed immensely to Baltic Challenge and Dynamic Mix in Iskenderun, Turkey. Since the Millennium, Naval Beach Group detachments have supported routine exercises and ARG deployments.

=== Recent service ===
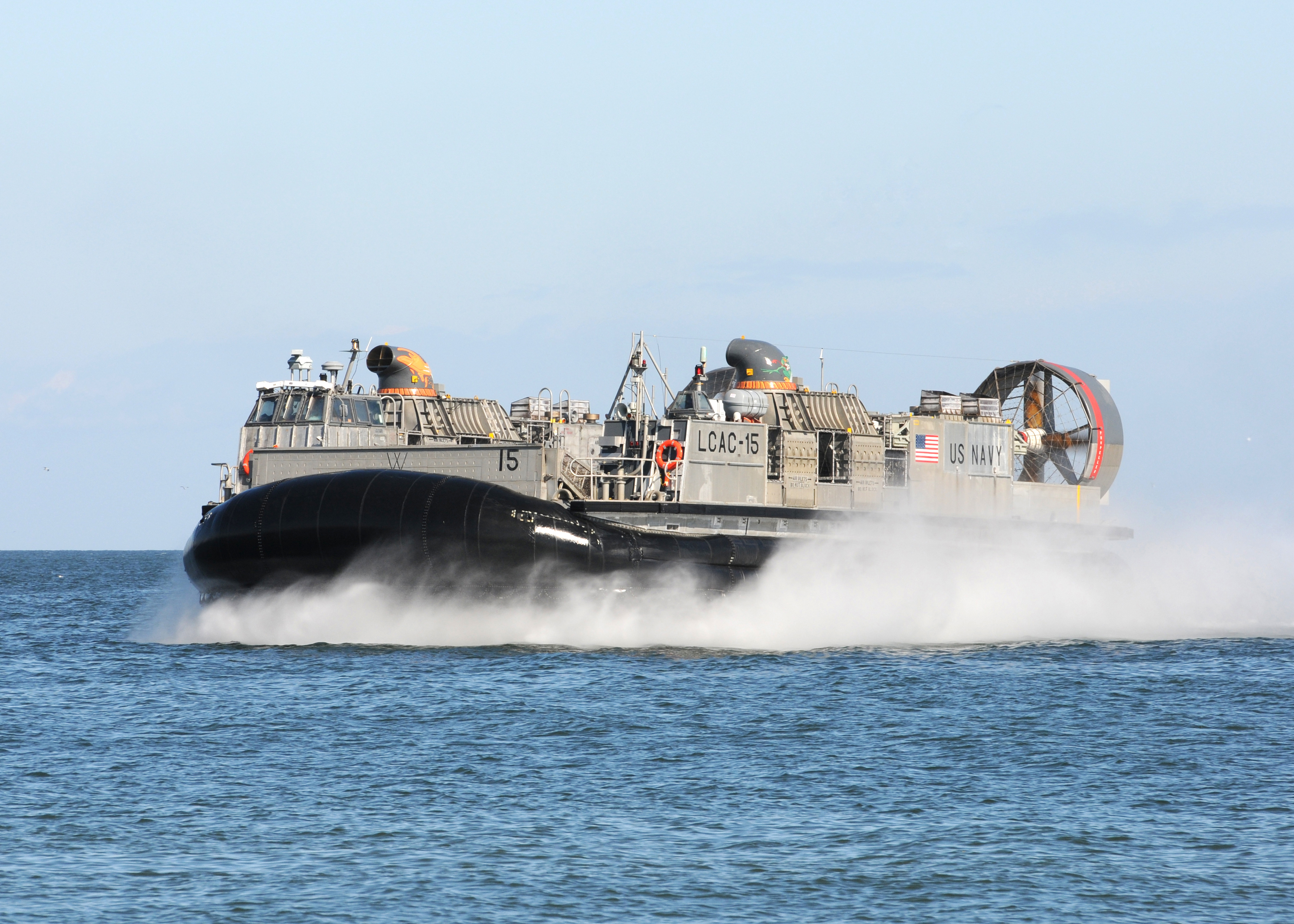
A Landing Craft Air Cushion approaches Anzio Beach at Joint Expeditionary Base Little Creek-Fort Story during Exercise Sand Crab 2011. Sand Crab is a three-day training exercise with more than 200 active and reserve component sailors and Marines participating from US Naval Beach Group 2, Amphibious Construction Battalion 2, Assault Craft Unit 4, Beachmaster Unit 2 and Amphibious Construction Battalion 2.

Most recently, since the terrorist attacks of September 11, 2001, NBG-2 units have participated in Operation Enduring Freedom, Operation Iraqi Freedom and Operation Unified Response.

== Notes ==
Citations

== Bibliography ==
Online resources

- "About Us". US Navy. This article incorporates text from this source, which is in the public domain.
