= Amphibious Construction Battalion 1 =

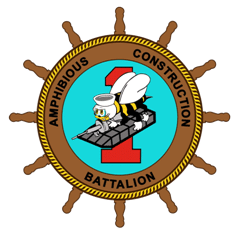
- ACB-1 Insignia
- Active: 1943–present
- Country: United States
- Branch: United States Navy
- Role: Ship-to-Shore movement of combat cargo and bulk fuel/water; Military construction
- Garrison/HQ: NAB Coronado, San Diego, California
- Nicknames: PHIBCB ONE; "Acey Bone"; "The Bone"
- Motto: "We put the 'Sea' in Seabees."
- Engagements: WWII; Korean War; Vietnam War; Gulf War; Iraq War

Commanders
- Current commander: Captain Javier Lopez-Martinez

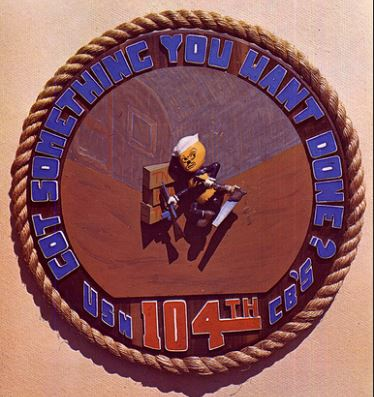
104th NCB WWII insignia (Seabee Museum)

Amphibious Construction Battalion ONE (ACB1 or ACB-1 or PHIBCB 1 or PHIBCB One) is an amphibious construction battalion in the United States Navy based in Coronado, California, and last in type unit. Amphibious Construction Battalion TWO was its sister unit based in Little Creek, Virginia.

== Mission ==
ACB-1's primary mission is to provide Ship to Shore transport of combat cargo, bulk fuel and water, and tactical camp operations supporting Amphibious Ready Group, Marine Expeditionary Force, Brigade sized operations, Combined/Joint Logistics Over the Shore (C/JLOTS), and Maritime Prepositioning Force (MPF) Operations.

== History ==
World War II – 104th Naval Construction Battalion

ACB-1 was originally commissioned at Camp Peary, Williamsburg, Virginia, 16 July 1943, as the 104th Naval Construction Battalion and was sent to Camp Endicott, Gulfport, Mississippi. During World War II CBs sent to the Pacific were attached to one of the four Amphibious Corps: I, III, and V were U.S. Marine Corps (under Admiral Nimitz, CINCPOA, Pearl Harbor) while VII Amphibious Corps was U.S. Army (under General MacArthur, SWPA, Brisbane, Australia). During WWII there were five battalions tasked with pontoons, barges and the building of ship to shore causeways: CBs 70, 81, 111, 128, and 302. The 104th was attached to VII Amphibious group in 1943 and sent to Gamadodo Center, Naval Base Milne Bay at Milne Bay, New Guinea; Australia in 1944; and Leyte-Samar Naval Base at Leyte, Philippine Islands, 1945. During these two years, the 104th completed numerous land based construction projects ranging from an airfield on Los Negros Island, in the Admiralties, to Naval Air Station Cubi Point on island of Leyte in the Philippines. The battalion was eventually deactivated in Dec 1945.

In January 1947, the 104th was reactivated and first began their Amphibious mission when the unit was tasked with "the assembly and placement of pontoon structures, beach rehabilitation, harbor development, salvage, and training of reservist in these operations". In October 1950, it was recognized by the Chief of Naval Operations, Admiral Forrest Sherman, that the 104th and 105th NCBs had specialized capabilities that separated them from the other Naval Construction Battalions and were re-designated Amphibious Construction Battalion One and Two.

Korean War – Amphibious Construction Battalion ONE

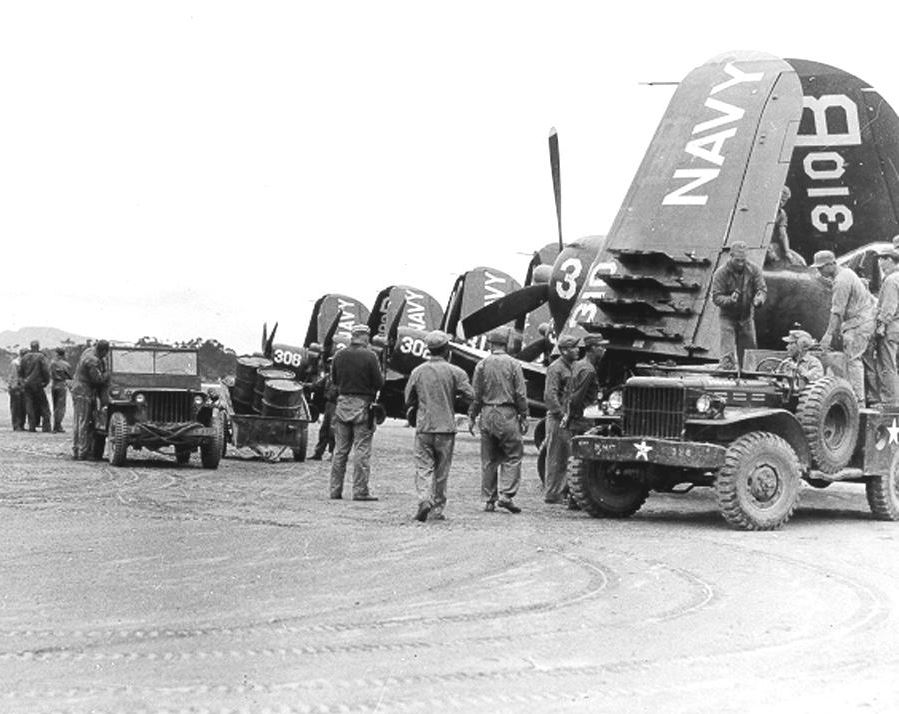
Yo Do Island ACB 1 refueling Corsairs 15 July 1952 (USN)

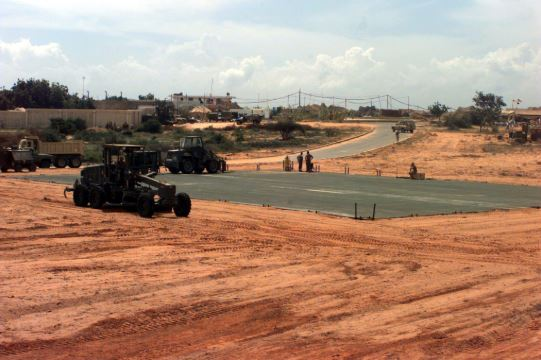
Operation Restore Hope Seabees from ACB 1 put the finishing touches on a helopad at the U.S. Embassy compound December 1992. (NARA)

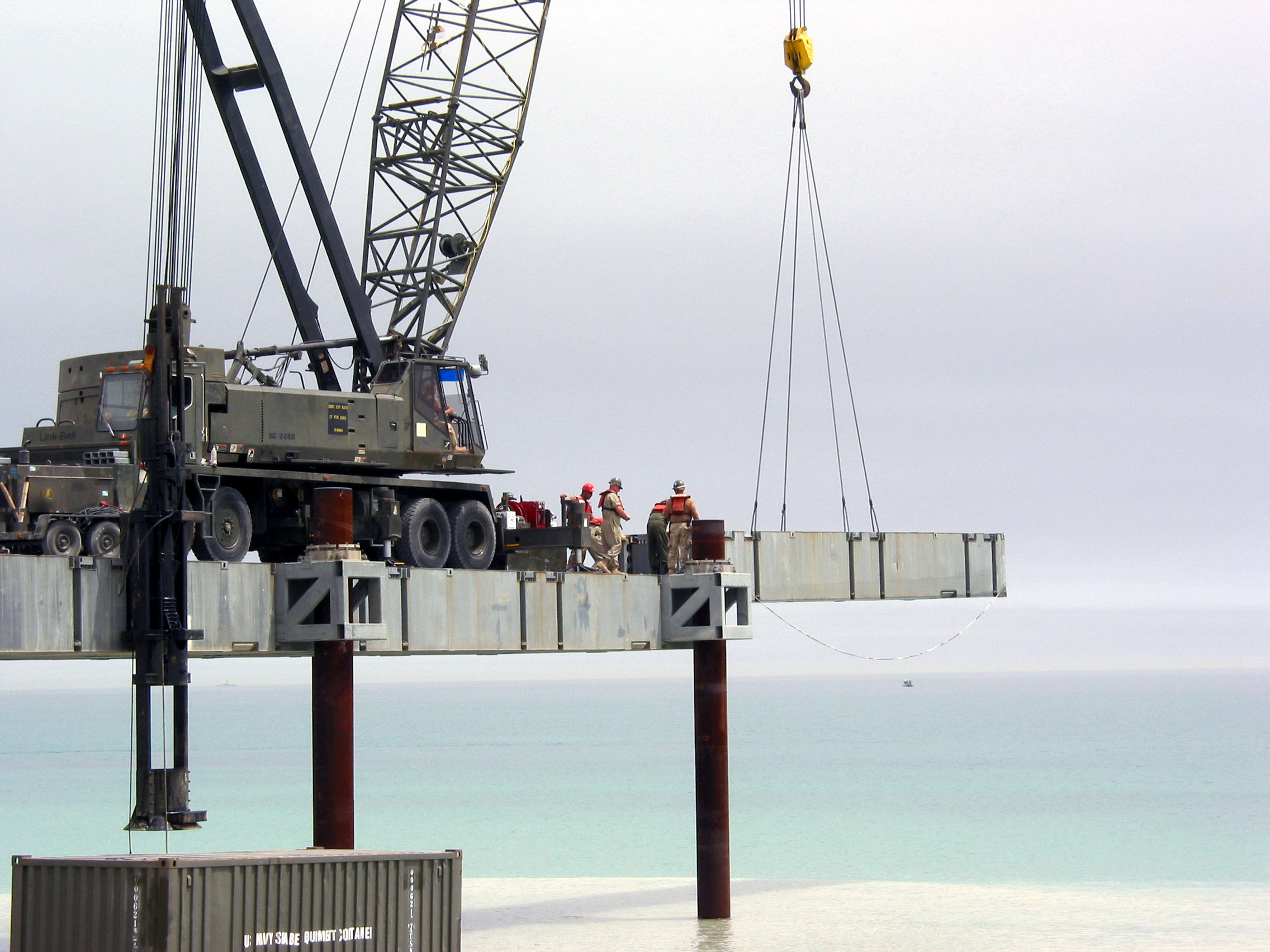
US Navy 030404-N-1050K-023U.S. Seabees from ACBs 1 and 2 place a deck section in the assembly of the Elevated Causeway System-Modular (ELCAS (M)) at Camp Patriot, Kuwait (4 Apr 2003) It was the first time the ELCAS/M (length 1,400-feet) was assembled in a combat operation.

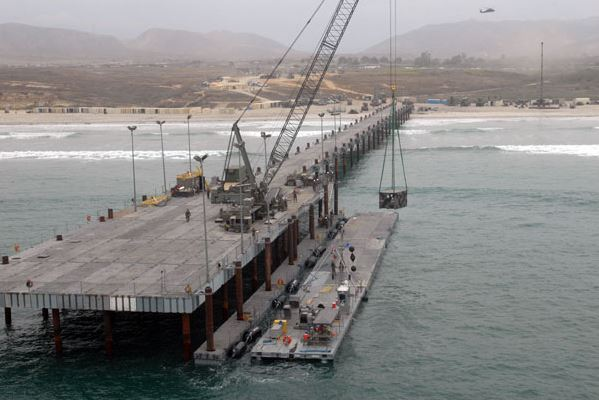
ACB -1 loading cargo 2005 (Seabee Museum)

During the Korean War several detachments were deployed to the Western Pacific in support of amphibious operations. In the September 1950, invasion of Inchon a pontoon causeway was brought into Inchon Harbor on D-Day plus 1 to be used a tide level landing. General Douglas MacArthur came ashore over this pier on D plus 2.

A month after 15 September 1950, landing at Inchon, ACB-1 moved to the east coast of Korea and again supported the 1st Marine Division. This time they landed at the port city of Wonsan as part of the 1st Marine Division's shift from the Inchon-Seoul area to the northeast coast of Korea. While the Marines moved north to positions in the Chosin Reservoir area, the Seabees built piers and unloaded ships.

- On 21 September 1950 a detachment from ACB 1 went into Seabee history. Aerial reconnaissance reported eight locomotives trapped by broken rail lines in the Yong Dong Po switch yard eight miles North of Inchon. The 10 Seabees, led UT Chief Bloomer, volunteered to attempt to liberate the engines from behind enemy lines. Adjacent to the switch yard was a Kirin Beer Brewery where the Seabees liberated cases of beer to be returned to the South also. They fired the engines and repaired the rails as they went returning to American lines. UTC Donald T. Bloomer, CM1 Welton N. Horn and CM2 Gordon K. Barnett received a letter of commendation with a ribbon and the combat "V" from the Admiral of the 7th Fleet for bravery in the exploit. The engines were turned over to the U.S. Army Transportation Corps.

Operation Crippled Chick: The assignment to build the emergency landing strip behind enemy lines on Yo Do island, fell to ACB-1s Detachment George. Led by Lt. T.E. Rowe, Detachment George was composed of one warrant machinist, six chief petty officers and 69 Seabee enlisted men. Six of these Seabees had landed at Inchon two years earlier. The seabees named the runway Briscoe Field for the Commander of the fleet Admiral Robert P. Briscoe

Vietnam

ACB 1 was the first CB to deploy to Vietnam as a component of Task Force 90 "Passage to Freedom" in 1954. That year an agreement was reached in Geneva recognizing the Communist government of North Vietnam which allowed for people residing in the North to move South before 15 May 1955. Both ACBs were assigned to TF-90. Nine years later, in 1964 ACB 1 would return as the first CB in the Vietnam War.

Gulf War – Somalia – Persian Gulf

In August 1990, PHIBCB ONE was the first Naval Construction Force (NCF) unit to deploy to Saudi Arabia in support of Operation Desert Shield. The Battalion assisted in the successful offload of the ships from Maritime Prepositioning Squadron TWO and Maritime Prepositioning Squadron THREE in support of the First Marine Expeditionary Force and provided some limited technical support to other joint units operating in the area.

On 10 December 1992, ACB-1 arrived at Mogadishu as part of the Naval Support Element in Somalia. Within a short time ACB-1 unloaded five of the Marines' Maritime Pre-positioning Force ships, refurbished the port, and provided fuel and water for military forces in Somalia.

In August 1994 and again in August 1995, the command deployed the Offload Preparation Party (OPP) for Maritime Prepositioning Squadron TWO in support of Operation Vigilant Warrior and Operation Vigilant Sentinel in the Persian Gulf due to the threat of resurgence of Iraqi aggression. In each case the personnel returned home after a couple months but were in a 48hr standby until March 1996.

Iraq War

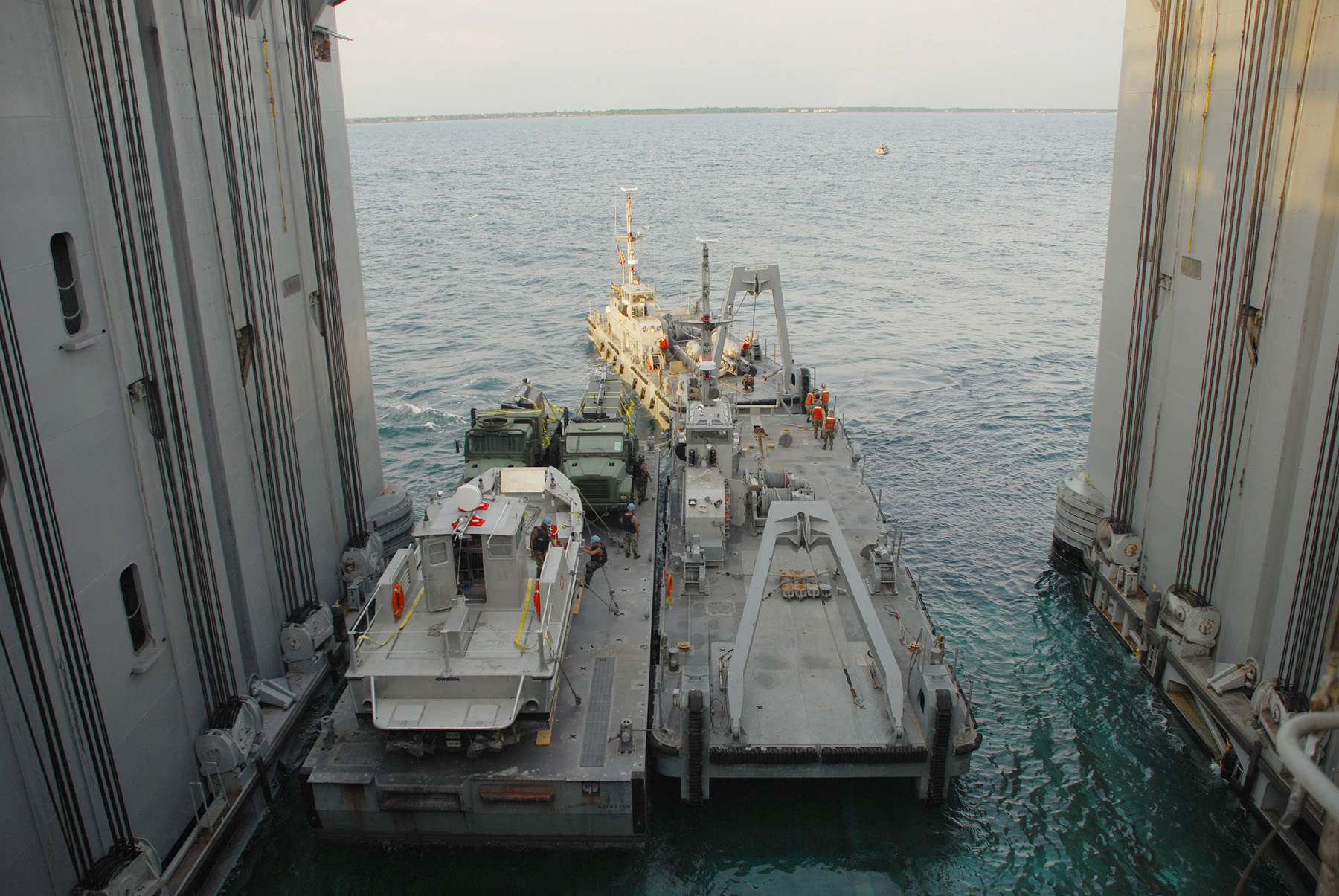
US Navy 070127-N-3589B-003 Seabees assigned to Amphibious Construction Battalion One offload the Improved Navy Lighter age System (INLS) from the Military Sealift Command (MSC) heavy lift ship SS Cape Mohican (T-AKR-5065). The T-AKR class vessels are known as Seabee (barge)s.

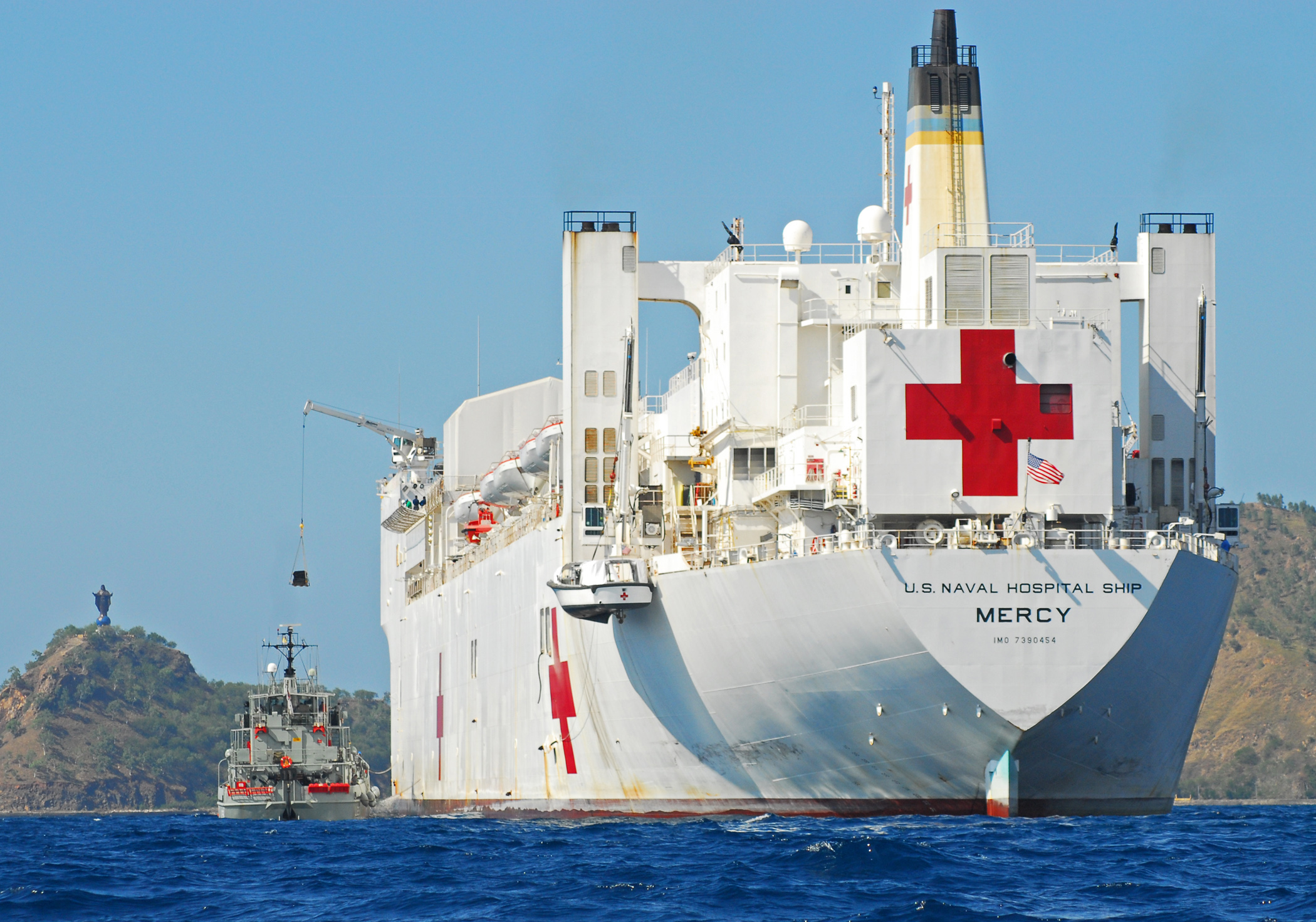
US Navy 100811-N-4044H-378 The Military Sealift Command hospital ship USNS Mercy (T-AH 19) ACB 1 was with the ship to Papua New Guinea for the Pacific Partnership 2010

The Battalion was the first Naval Construction Force unit to deploy during Operation Desert Shield.

Most recently, in January 2003, ACB-1/2 was deployed to Kuwait Naval Base, Kuwait in support of Operation Enduring Freedom and Operation Iraqi Freedom. Moving over 1,200 short tons (1,100 t) of cargo, on nine C-5 Galaxy aircraft, the PHIBs constructed the largest Logistics Support Area (LSA) in ACB history, housing over 4,500 personnel. Additionally, ACBs were instrumental with the complete download of 13 MPF ships encompassing three MPSRONs. ELCAS-M was also deployed to move thousands of ammo containers from ship to shore. A small detachment from ACB-1 also moved forward in Iraq to assist the NMCBs with the anchoring of a floating bridge.

In 2005 ACB 1 took part in the U.S. military's Operation Unified Assistance response to the Indian Ocean tsunami.

== Unit Awards ==
In recognition of outstanding services rendered in the Korean War, personnel of the Battalion received three Bronze Stars, eight Navy Commendations with Combat "V"s, the Presidential Unit Citation, the Korean Presidential Unit Citation, and numerous letters of recognition for meritorious services. During the Vietnam War, the Battalion was awarded the Navy Expeditionary Medal, the Vietnam Service Medal, and the Meritorious Unit Commendation. Additionally, the command was awarded a Secretary of the Navy, John Howard Dalton, Letter of Commendation for meritorious service from 1994 to 1996.

Unit awards in order of precedence:

- Presidential Unit Citation KOREA
- Defense Superior Service Medal
- Navy Unit Commendation with V (8) KOREA
- Navy Meritorious Unit Commendation Desert Storm
- Republic of Korea Presidential Unit Citation
- Vietnam Presidential Unit Citation 1955 Operation Passage to Freedom

Campaign and Service Awards

- Asiatic-Pacific Campaign Medal (104 NCB)
- Philippine Liberation Medal (104 NCB)
- World War II Victory Medal (104 NCB)
- Korean Service Medal (3)
- Navy Expeditionary Medal KOREA
- Vietnam Service Medal
- Vietnam Campaign Medal
- Humanitarian Service Medal – Det A1-81, 1981 Boat people
- Southwest Asia Service Medal
- Kuwait Liberation Medal (Saudi Arabia)
- Kuwait Liberation Medal (Kuwait)
- Humanitarian Service Medal – Operation Unified Assistance2004

== See also ==
- Admiral Ben Moreell
- Amphibious Construction Battalion 2 (ACB-2)
- Civil Engineer Corps United States Navy
- Naval Construction Battalion
- Naval Mobile Construction Battalion 1
- Naval Mobile Construction Battalion 3
- Naval Mobile Construction Battalion 4
- Naval Mobile Construction Battalion 5
- Naval Mobile Construction Battalion 11
- Naval Mobile Construction Battalion 133
- Naval Construction Battalion Center (Gulfport, Mississippi)
- Naval Construction Battalion Center Port Hueneme
- Naval Amphibious Base Little Creek
- Naval Amphibious Base Coronado
- Seabee
- Seabees in World War II
- Underwater Construction Teams
