= CPIC =

CPIC may refer to:

- Crime Prevention and Information Center
- Canadian Police Information Centre
- Cancer Prevention Institute of California
- Capital Planning and Investment Control
- China Pacific Insurance Company
- China Power Investment Corporation
- Citizens Property Insurance Corporation, Florida insurance agency
- Clinical Pharmacogenetics Implementation Consortium
- Coalition Press Information Center
- Common Programming Interface for Communications
- Construction Project Information Committee
