= Naval Mobile Construction Battalion 1 =

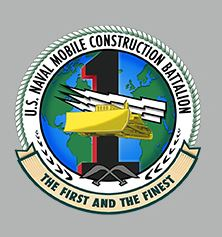
- NMCB ONE insignia
- Active: 15 March 1942 – present
- Country: United States
- Branch: USN
- Part of: Naval Construction Group TWO
- Homeport: Construction Battalion Center Gulfport
- Nicknames: "The First and The Finest"
- Engagements: World War II; Vietnam War; Gulf War; Operation Enduring Freedom; Operation Iraqi Freedom

Commanders
- Current commander: CDR James Stewart

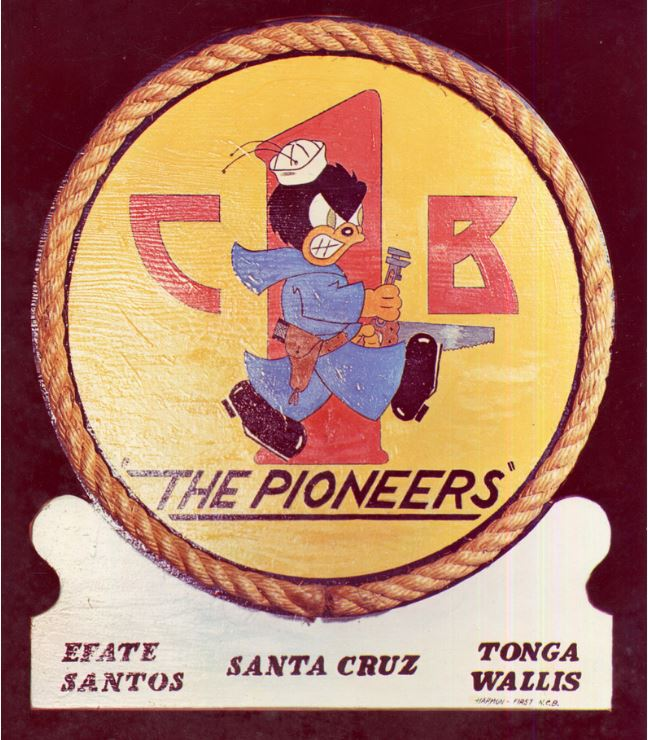
1st Naval Construction Battalion WWII insignia. (Seabee Museum)

Naval Mobile Construction Battalion 1 (NMCB ONE), is a United States Navy Seabee battalion. NMCB ONE, the original "Pioneers", has a long history as the very first Naval Construction Battalion of the service that would become known as the Seabees.

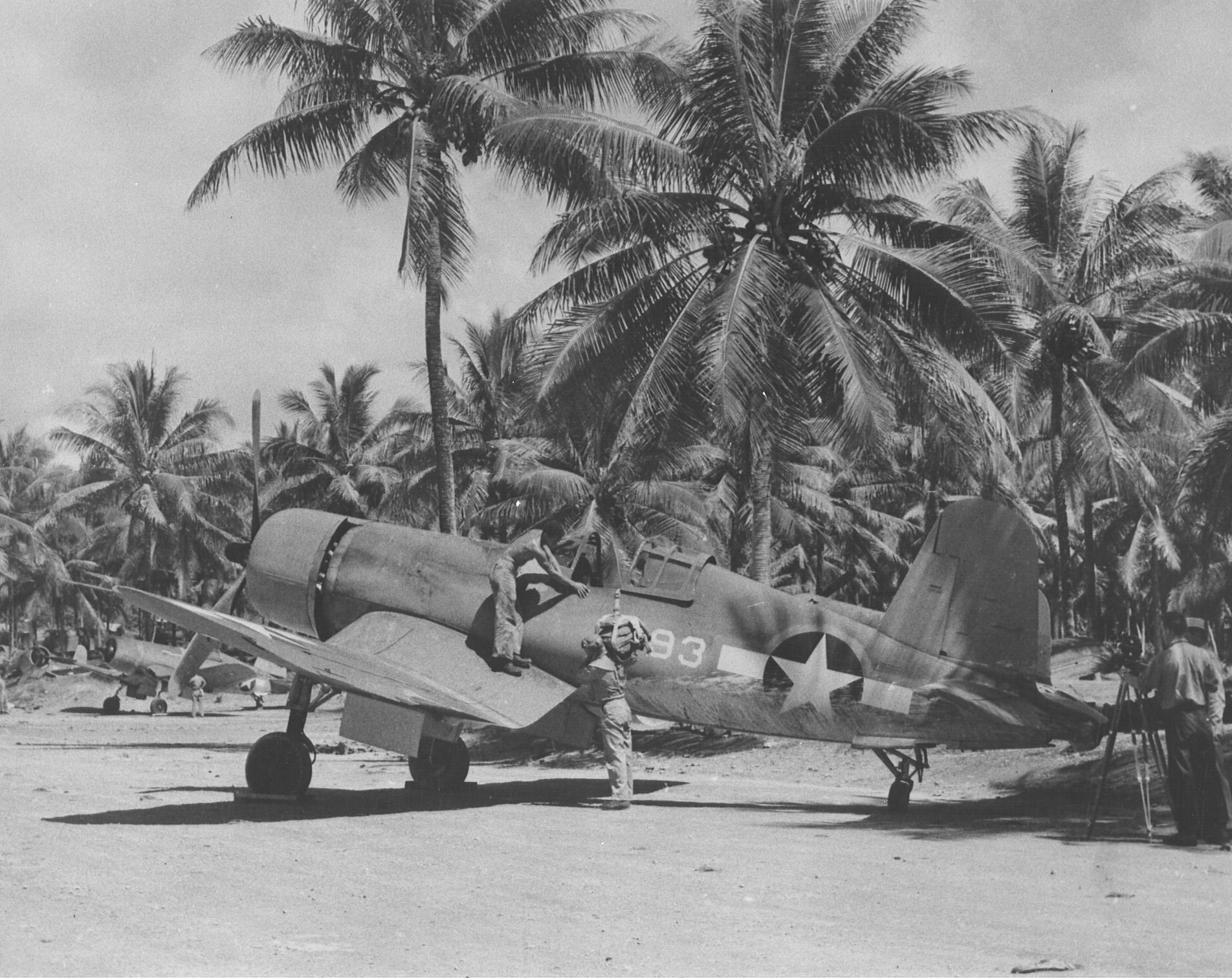
F4U at Turtle Bay Airfield on Espirto Santo. One of the Black Sheep Squadron (VMF-214).

== History ==
Commissioned on 15 March 1942 as Naval Construction Battalion 1. The battalion was split into two construction detachments. The 2nd Construction Detachment went to Tongatabu and the 3rd Construction Detachment went to Efate, New Hebrides. The Seabee name did not exist when these groups deployed.

=== World War II ===
Mid-year 1941 CB 1 did not exist, civilian contractors were working large construction contracts at Guam, Midway, Wake, Pearl Harbor, Iceland, Newfoundland, and Bermuda. BuDocks decided to improve the Navy's supervision through the creation of "Headquarters Construction Companies". These companies would report to the Officers in Charge of Construction. They would be the draftsmen and engineering aids needed by the inspectors and supervisors to do their work. These companies would consist of two officers and 99 enlisted men, but would not do any actual construction. Rear Admiral Chester Nimitz, Chief of the Bureau of Navigation, authorized the formation of the first Hq Company on 31 October 1941. Recruitment started in November and the company was formed on 7 December. The men went through boot at Naval Station Newport, Rhode Island. By 16 December 1941, four additional companies had been authorized. 7 December happened changing plans and with them the ratings needed by a change in mission. The first Company formed provided the nucleus for the formation of the 1st Naval Construction Detachment sent to Bora bora. In the beginning that detachment was called the 1st CB, but Budocks decided its size made that an incorrect identification. It then became the 1st Naval Construction Detachment. With the outbreak of war, Admiral Ben Moreell, Chief of BuDocks, recommended creating three Naval Construction Battalions and on 28 December requested authority to carry this out. On 5 January 1942, the Bureau of Navigation authorized recruitment of tradesmen for those Battalions. Simultaneous to Adm. Moreell's Battalion request, the other four Hq Construction Companies had been approved. So, Hq Companies 2 & 3 were combined to form the 1st Naval Construction Battalion and deployed as the 2nd & 3rd Construction Detachments. Upon completion of training, CB 1 was sent to the South Pacific for 23 months in the Tonga and Samoan Islands. The Detachments built runways, Quonset bases, gun emplacements, and petroleum tank farms. The Fua'amotu International Airport and Faleolo International Airport were created as projects of the 2nd Construction Detachment. The 3rd Construction Detachment built Quoin Hill Airfield on Efate that was abandoned in 1946 as well as a bomber base. A detail from the 3rd detachment was rushed from Efate to Espirito Santo to build a bomber strip to attack the Japanese on Guadalcanal. Also on Efate were the 4th Marine Defense Battalion and the 24th Infantry Regiment(colored). The Marines sent an AA Battery and the Army sent an Infantry Company to help the Seabees. Together, working around the clock, they cleared and laid a 6,000' runway in the jungle in 20 days. Fighters landed the day after completion and B17s came the next. The Turtle Bay Airfield became a fighter strip that today is abandoned to nature. Major Pappy Boyington with his VMF-214 were stationed at Turtle bay in 1943. Another Medal of Honor winner flying out of the base was 1st Lt. Kenneth A. Walsh of VMF-124. The battalion was sent stateside and decommissioned in June 1944.

=== Post-war ===
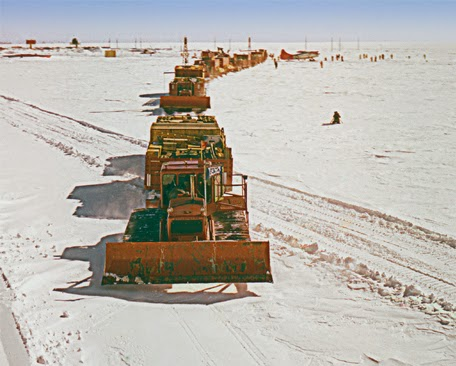
MCB 1 Sled train departing Little America for traverse to Byrd Station(646 miles) or the South Pole(850 miles). The Navy ordered SP-LGP D8s (SP=special) with the frames extended 4 feet and tracks 54 inches wide resulting in a ground pressure of 4.30 psi and blades 18.5 feet wide. There were two types of sleds: 10 ton or 20 ton that could be hitched in multiples.

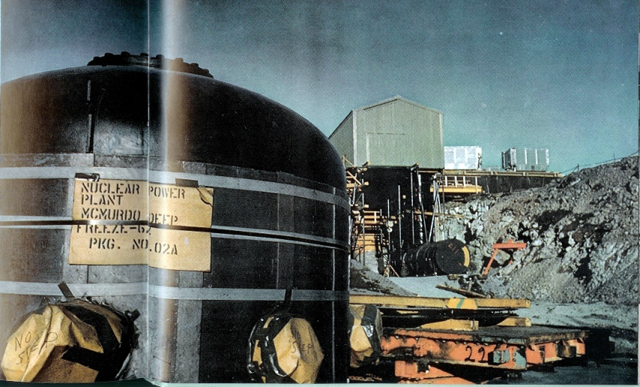
Nuclear Power Plant constructed by MCB 1.

In 1949, the Navy went through a reorganization that created a new type of construction unit – the Mobile Construction Battalion (MCB). On 8 August 1949, U.S. Naval Mobile Construction Battalion 1 (MCB 1) was established at Naval Amphibious Base Little Creek, Virginia and was formally commissioned on 28 October. In December the battalion took part in a multi-service Operation PORTEX on Vieques, Puerto Rico. In 1951 homeport changed when the battalion moved from Little Creek to Davisville, Rhode Island. During the next four years the battalion would go to Puerto Rico; Guantanamo Bay, Cuba; Bermuda; Port Lyautey, French Morocco; Argentia, Newfoundland; and Rota, Spain. During the Korean war Atlantic fleet CBs did not deploy to that theater of operations. In 1956, the battalion went to Antarctica and participated in Operation Deep Freeze II. During that deployment MCB 1 had detachments on six continents. MCB 1 returned to Antarctica in 1961 to assemble a nuclear power plant for which the battalion received the Navy Unit Commendation.

=== Vietnam ===
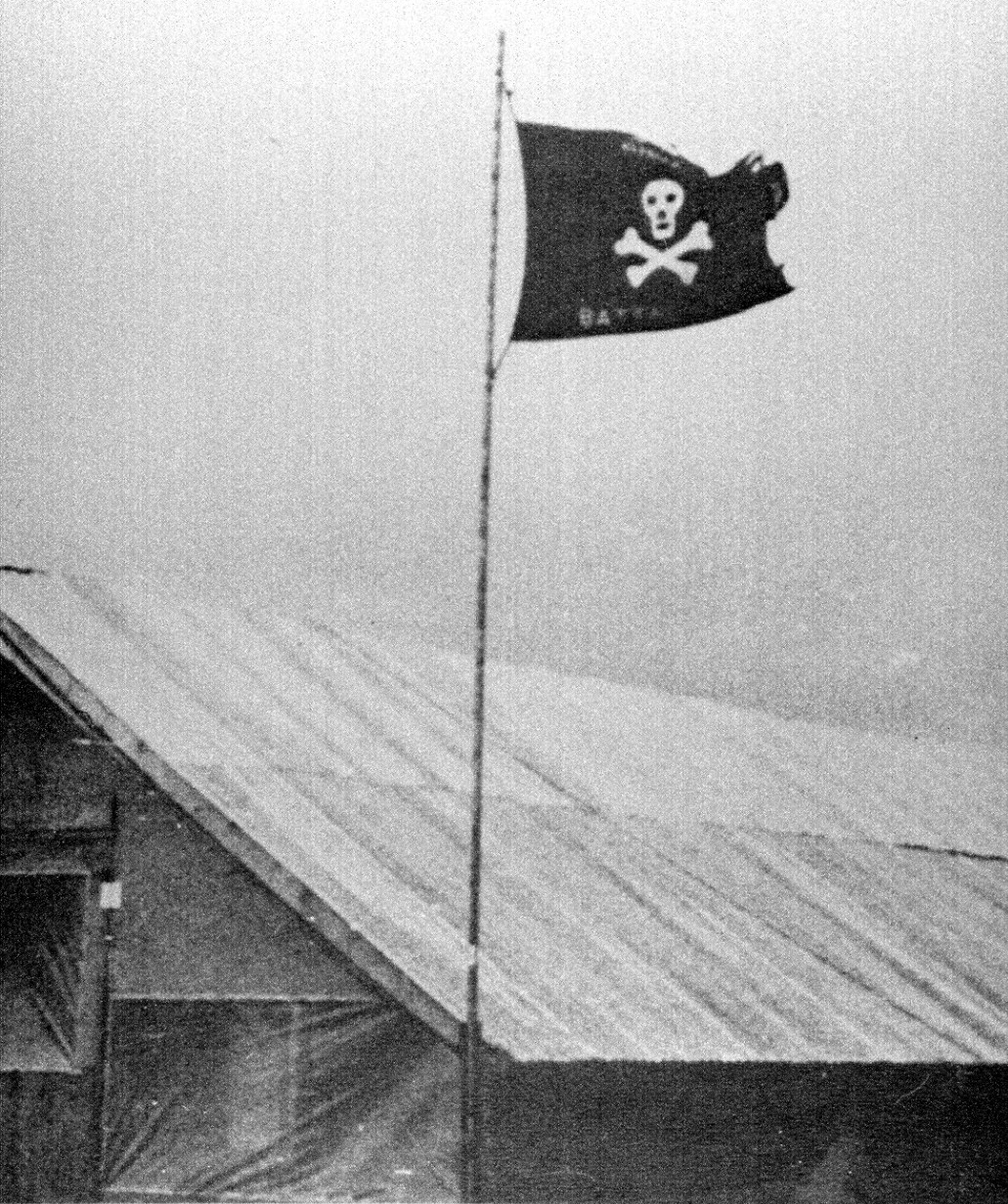
Ghost Battalion colors at Quang Tri. The Seabees had 11,000 graves to move in order to construct that airfield.

MCB 1 was the first Atlantic Fleet Battalion to deploy to Vietnam. From 1966 to 1970, the battalion made four consecutive deployments to Southeast Asia. During the second deployment an urgent airfield was needed at Quảng Trị. The project was designated "top secret", site "X", and to be completed in under 45 days. MCBs 1, 3, 4, 7, 11, 74, 121, and 133 all sent detachments of men and equipment to get the job done. Those detachments dubbed themselves the Ghost Battalion and chose the Jolly Roger for the battalion's colors The Ghost Battalion was disbanded 1 November 1967. While making those deployments four NMCB One members died: Constructionman Starkey, Steelworker 3rd Class Williams, Chief Builder McGinn, and Lieutenant Junior Grade Moscrip.

=== One's Seabee Teams ===
- 0101 1968 Chau Phu
- 0102 1968 Phu Vunh
- 0103 1969 My Tho
- 0104 1969 Xuan Loc Special Forces Camp
- 0105 1970 Bac Lieu
- 0106 1970 Ham Tan
- 0107 1970 Tam An

=== 1970s through present ===
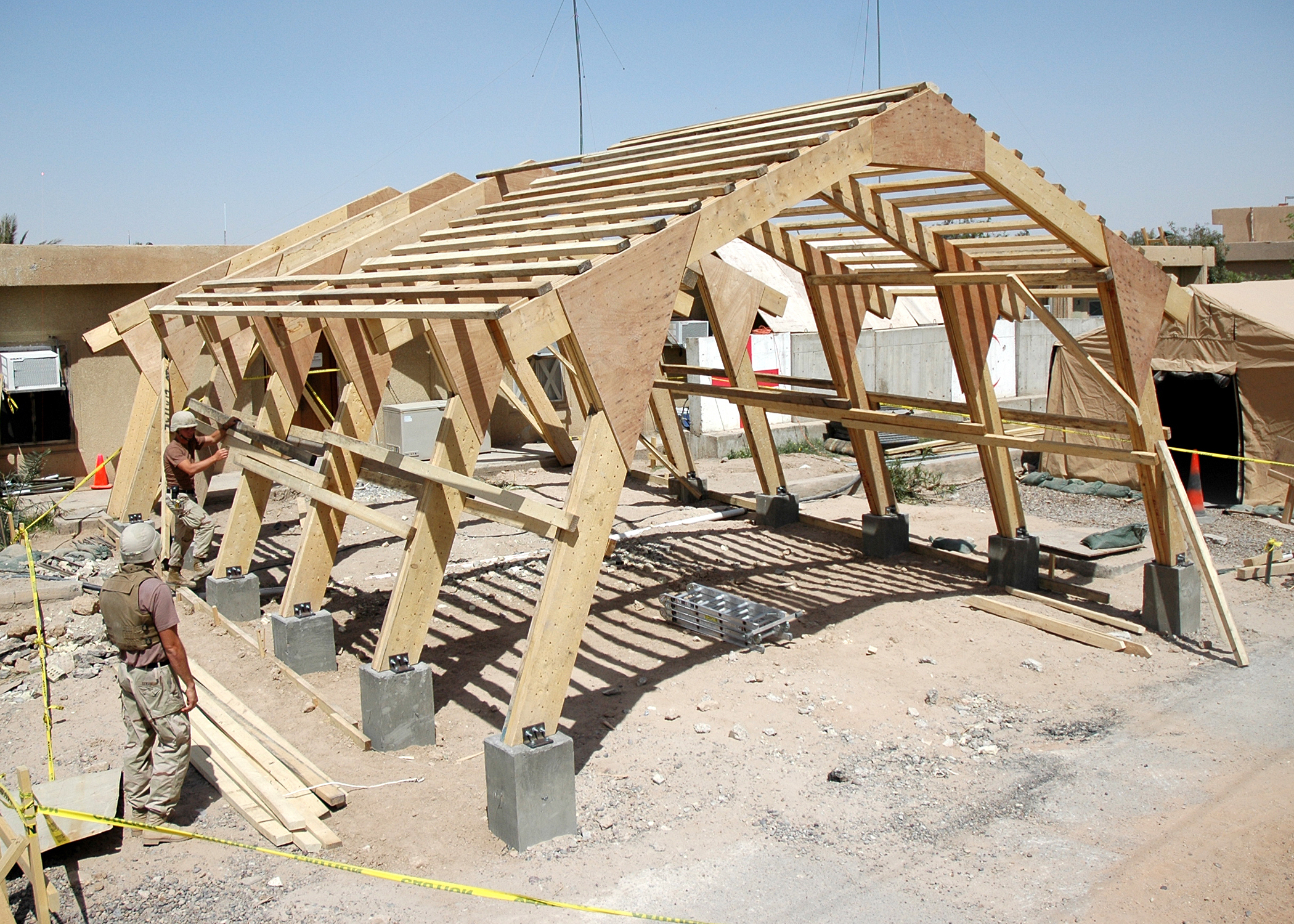
US Navy 050403-N-0577F-001 Seabees of NMCB ONE Air-Det, work to construct the Surgical Facility at Camp Fallujah, Iraq

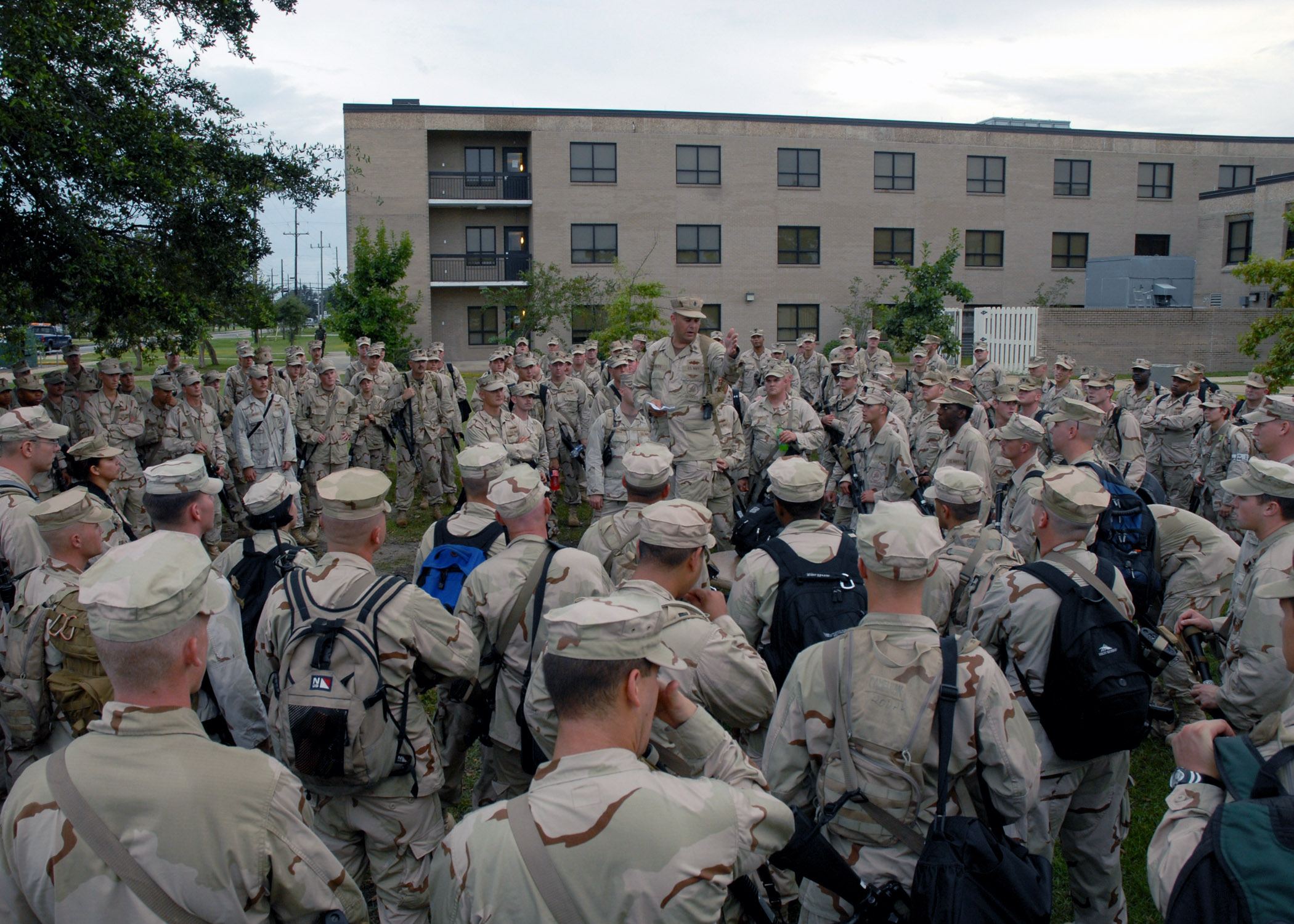
US Navy 070924-N-3857R-003 Chief EO Orlando Phillips, NMCB ONE gives instruction

From the fall of 1971 through early summer of 1972, NMCB ONE was the second battalion to occupy and construct the British Indian Ocean Territory station on Diego Garcia. They relieved Naval Mobile Construction Battalion 40, who had landed, nine months earlier, on the island by LSDs and LSTs. They constructed the facilities that NMCB ONE would complete over their nine-month deployment. The runway that NMCB ONE's advanced party landed on in C-130s was 3000 feet long. When NMCB ONE left, the runway was 11,500 feet. It was at grade and ready for NMCB 62 to pour, 50'wide x 12"thick x 11,500'long in concrete. NMCB ONE also made the concrete silos for storing the cement to pour the runway. The battalion also prepared the aggregate piles by blasting and mining coral and rock, crushing it and stock piling it for 62's use. The pile was over 500 feet tall, creating a mountainous hill on the island, whereas the average elevation had originally been 6.5 feet above sea level.

In 1974 NMCB ONE was the last Battalion to deploy from Davisville. When the battalion returned from Rota, it was to Naval Construction Battalion Center, Gulfport, Mississippi.

1983 Beirut barracks bombing: On 23 October 1983 a truck laden with explosives was driven into the U.S. Marine's peacekeeping force barracks in Beirut. Killed were: 220 Marines, 18 USN, 3 U.S. Army with 80 seriously wounded. NMCB ONE quickly deployed a 42-man DET to construct bunkers for the Marines. An additional 40 men were sent to get the job done

NMCB ONE sent two details in 1990 to Saudi Arabia in support of Operation Desert Shield and Operation Desert Storm. The following year, the battalion provided disaster relief following super typhoons on Guam and American Samoa. Upon returning to homeport in May 1992, the battalion was again providing disaster relief, this time in South Florida in the aftermath of Hurricane Andrew. In December 1992, NMCB ONE redeployed from Rota to Somalia in support of Operation Restore Hope.

A 180-person detachment was sent to Bosnia-Herzegovina in December 1997 to support Operation Joint Guard. NMCB 1 returned to the Balkans when a 97-person detachment arrived in Kosovo tasked to Task Force Falcon in December 1999. During the 2000 European deployment, Detail Souda Bay assisted disaster recovery operations in remote Crete villages following torrential rains.

In June 2002, the battalion deployed to Okinawa, Japan for the first time since 1987, with construction projects across the Pacific. Upon arriving in Okinawa, the battalion immediately sent an Air-Det of 102 Seabees to Basilan Island, in the PI, in support of Operation Enduring Freedom. Under hostile conditions, the Air-Det improved roads, drilled wells, built bridges and base camps and rebuilt a timber pier.

During its 2003–2004 Pacific Deployment, the battalion became the first NMCB to have two main-body deployment sites: Rota, Spain and Guam. NMCB ONE had construction operations in the Atlantic, European, Pacific and Central Command Areas of Responsibility, while deploying its Air-Det in support of Iraqi Freedom. In September 2004, NMCB ONE assisted disaster recovery operations at NAS Pensacola following Hurricane Ivan.

For the 2005 European deployment NMCB ONE had details tasked in twelve countries throughout Europe, Africa, Asia, and the Caribbean. The Air Det returned to Iraq in support of Operation Iraqi Freedom. Hurricane Katrina disaster recovery operations greeted ONE's return to homeport in August 2005.

In June 2006, NMCB ONE deployed to 20 sites in 9 countries as part of their Pacific deployment. The battalion was tasked with construction projects in Okinawa, Atsugi, Sasebo, Yokosuka, Iwakuni, Fuji, Chinhae, Pohang, Diego Garcia, Camp Pendleton, and San Clemente Island, contingency operations in Pohnpei, Indonesia, Philippines, and Afghanistan, and prison detainee operations in Iraq.

In September 2007 the battalion deployed to 16 different sites throughout CENTCOM, PACOM, and NORTHCOM. NMCB ONE provided contingency construction and engineering support to both Operation Iraqi Freedom II and Operation Enduring Freedom. While supporting the mission in CENTCOM, the battalion was tasked with construction projects in Guam and San Nicolas Island (SNI), CA. Those dets returned to the main body mid-deployment.

== Unit awards ==
A unit citation or commendation is an award bestowed upon an organization for the action cited. Members of the unit who participated in said actions are allowed to wear the awarded unit citation on their uniforms. NMCB ONE has been presented with the following awards:

- Navy Unit Commendation 4 awards: Antarctica 1962; Vietnam 1968, 1969, and 1970
- Navy Meritorious Unit Commendation Vietnam
- Republic of VietnamCivil Actions Medal Unit Citation
- Republic of Vietnam Gallantry Cross with Palm Unit Award 4 awards, individuals receive once
- Army Meritorious Unit Commendation 1970
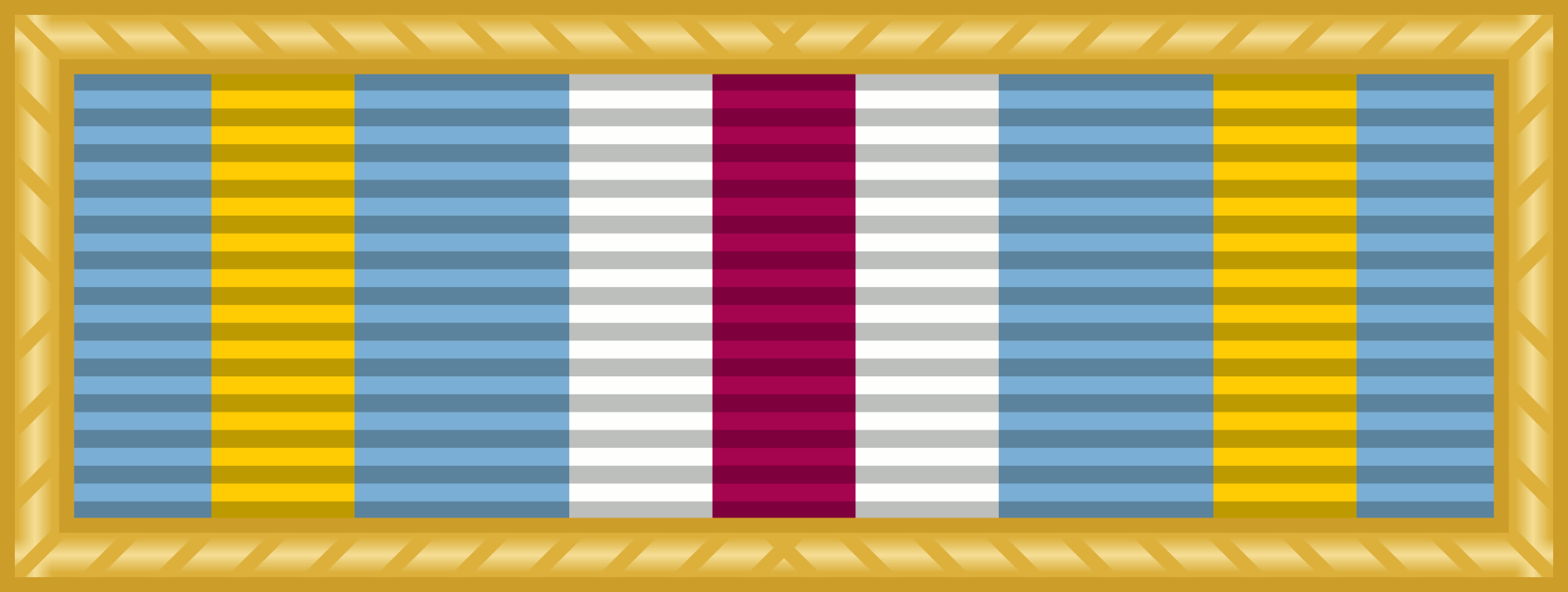
- Joint Meritorious Unit Award 1990–1991
- Presidential Unit Citation (Philippines) 2002 Exercise Balikatan 02-1
- Meritorious Unit Commendation Combined Task Force Iraqi Maritime 2010–2011
- Army Meritorious Unit Commendation 2011–2012
- Navy Meritorious Unit Commendation Operation Allies Refuge 2021

Campaign and service awards

Vietnam Service NMCB ONE's Battle Streamer for Vietnam has one silver star and one bronze star: the streamer alone counts as the first award. The conflict was divided into 18 award periods and the battalion qualifies for seven.

- Asiatic–Pacific Campaign Medal 1945
- World War II Victory Medal 1945
- National Defense Service Medal, Vietnam,
- Vietnam Campaign Medal with 60– , Device, 8 awards
- Vietnam Service Medal
- Humanitarian Service Medal 29 July-15 Sept 1976
- National Defense Service Medal, Operation Desert Storm
- National Defense Service Medal, war on terror
- Humanitarian Service Medal USA Hurricane Katrina 2005
- Chief of Naval Operations Letter of Commendation 2009
- Battle Efficiency Award 15 awards (1962, 1966, 1972, 1981, 1985, 1991, 1995, 1997, 2001, 2004, 2008, 2011, 2018, 2020, 2025,)
- Peltier Award 8 awards (1962, 1966, 1972, 1981, 1997, 2001, 2004, 2020)

== See also ==
- Admiral Ben Moreell
- Amphibious Construction Battalion 1 (ACB-1)
- Amphibious Construction Battalion 2 (ACB-2)
- Civil Engineer Corps United States Navy
- Naval Construction Battalion aka Seabee
- Naval Amphibious Base Little Creek
- Naval Amphibious Base Coronado
- Naval Construction Battalion Center (Gulfport, Mississippi)
- Naval Construction Battalion Center Port Hueneme
- Naval Mobile Construction Battalion 3
- Naval Mobile Construction Battalion 4
- Naval Mobile Construction Battalion 5
- Naval Mobile Construction Battalion 11
- Naval Mobile Construction Battalion 25
- Naval Mobile Construction Battalion 133
- Seabees in World War II
- Seabees Memorial
