= Coalition Press Information Center =

The Coalition Press Information Center is a centralized media information center that was established during the 2003 invasion of Iraq.

== Operation Iraqi Freedom ==
During the preparations for Operation Iraqi Freedom a CPIC was established at the Kuwait City Hilton, (actually located outside Kuwait City proper in the district of Mangaf). The CPIC was staffed by members of the United States Army, Navy, Air Force and Marines; the British Army, Royal Marines and Royal Air Force and the Australian Army. The CPIC director was US. Army Colonel Guy T. Shields. The deputy director was British Army Lieutenant Colonel Robert Partridge.

A CPIC is normally responsible for delivering press releases and casualty reports, conducting news conferences, arranging interviews, and escorting media to newsworthy events. With the expectation that Kuwait City would be once again invaded by Iraqi forces, Coalition Forces Land Component Command established its headquarters in Doha, Qatar and the CPIC in Kuwait City ceded to the commanders in Qatar its authority to release any information to the media.

The CPIC was established at the Kuwait Hilton in early February, 2003 by the 22nd MPAD, an active Army unit stationed at Ft. Bragg, NC. The 318th PAOC, a U.S. Army Reserve unit based out of Forest Park, Illinois, took over operation of the CPIC on February 22, 2003. Before the CPIC ceased operations in Kuwait in early May, 2003, credentials were issued to more than 6,500 journalists, permitting them various levels of access to coalition forces.

After the 2003 invasion, the CPIC was established on the second floor of the Iraqi Convention Center in Baghdad's Green Zone by the 372nd MPAD, an Army Reserve Unit from Nashville, TN. It was from this location that Coalition Chief Military Spokesman Brigadier General Mark Kimmitt and Coalition Provisional Authority Spokesman Dan Senor gave many of their press briefings in the first years of the occupation. In 2005, the CPIC was moved to a parking structure outside of the convention center to make way for the Council of Representatives of Iraq.

Embedded: The Media at War in Iraq, An Oral History, by Bill Katovsky, Timothy Carlson

https://abcnews.go.com/International/story?id=79598&page=1

== See also ==
- George W. Bush
- Iraq
