= 222nd Broadcast Operations Detachment =

- Country: United States of America
- Branch: Army Reserve
- Type: Public Affairs
- Size: Detachment
- Garrison/HQ: George S. Patton Army Reserve Center, Bell, California
- Motto(s): Feed the Beast
- Website: 222nd BOD on DVIDS 222nd BOD on Facebook 222nd BOD on Twitter

Commanders
- Current commander: MAJ SIDNEY MENDOZA

Insignia
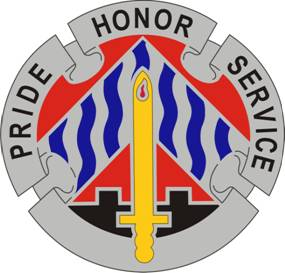
- Distinctive unit insignia

Stationed in Bell, CA, the 222nd Broadcast Operations Detachment (BOD) is an Army Reserve public affairs unit that is capable of operating an Armed Forces Network (AFN) radio/television station as well as providing media relations support for the U.S. Army Reserves, Regular Army, and Department of Defense. Their products include videography packages such as video news releases (VNR), B-Roll packages, veteran history projects, and training videos. Most recently, the 222nd supported the U.S. Army's public affairs mission with two, year-long tours of duty in Baghdad, Iraq, were the unit was awarded the Meritorious Unit Commendation (Army), 2003–2004. The 222nd BOD supports the 201st Press Camp Headquarters (PCH) in Bell, CA, and the 63rd Regional Support Command (RSC) in Mountain View, CA.

== Mission ==
The mission of the 222nd BOD is to establish and operate mobile radio/television broadcast facilities, perform as the broadcast support arm for a Public Affairs Operations Center, and produce broadcast products for distribution to internal and external worldwide audiences through the American Forces Radio Television Services.

== About Army Public Affairs ==
Public Affairs fulfills the Army's obligation to keep the American people and the Army informed, and helps to establish the conditions that lead to confidence in America's Army and its readiness to conduct operations in peacetime, conflict and war.

Enlisted Soldiers in the 222nd BOD are Broadcast and Journalism Specialists (46S) and Multimedia Illustrators (25M), along with a Unit Administrative Specialist (42A) and a Unit Supply Specialist (92Y). Officers in a Public Affairs unit can come from all branches of the U.S. Army. They need only complete the Public Affairs Qualification Course in Ft. Meade, Maryland to receive the Functional Area MOS for Public Affairs (46A). For both enlisted soldiers and officers, Public Affairs units are available in all components of the U.S. Army (Active, Reserve, and Army National Guard).

Army Public Affairs Broadcast Specialists are involved in creating, filming, reporting, hosting and editing news and entertainment radio and television programs. They are primarily responsible for participating in and supervising the operation of audio or video news for the American Forces Network (AFN), The Pentagon Channel or Armed Forces Radio and Television Service (AFRTS). Combat Correspondents, or broadcast journalists in the 222nd prepare scripts and news copy for radio and television programs and participate as hosts, announcers, masters of ceremonies, and actors in radio and television broadcasts. Journalists also research, prepare and disseminate information through news releases, radio and television products. They perform as writers, reporters, editors, videographers, producers, and program hosts in radio and television productions.

== Requirements ==
In order to become a Broadcast and Journalism Specialist (46S) in the U.S. Army, a soldier must meet the following requirements.

Initial Requirements

- Training Information: 25 weeks, at the Defense Information School (DINFOS), Fort Meade, MD
- ASVAB Score Required: General Technical (GT): 107
- Security Clearance: Secret
- Strength Requirement: Light
- Physical Profile Requirement: 222121

Other Requirements

- Be able to type 20 WPM prior to school attendance;
- Have no speech impediments;
- Show proof by official transcript of having successfully completed at least two years of high school English;
- Must possess a valid vehicle operator license;

Similar Civilian Occupations

- Broadcast News Analysts
- Public Relations Specialists
- Radio and Television Announcers
- Reporters and Correspondents

Officers need to meet the following requirements in order to join.

Initial Requirements

- Must have completed their Basic Branch BOLC.
- Attend and complete the Public Affairs Qualification Course (PACS-Q), at the Defense Information School (DINFOS), Ft. Meade, MD.

Similar Civilian Occupations

- Public relations manager
- Communications manager
- News editor
- Web manager
- Correspondent
- Director
- Producer
