= 10th Press Camp Headquarters =

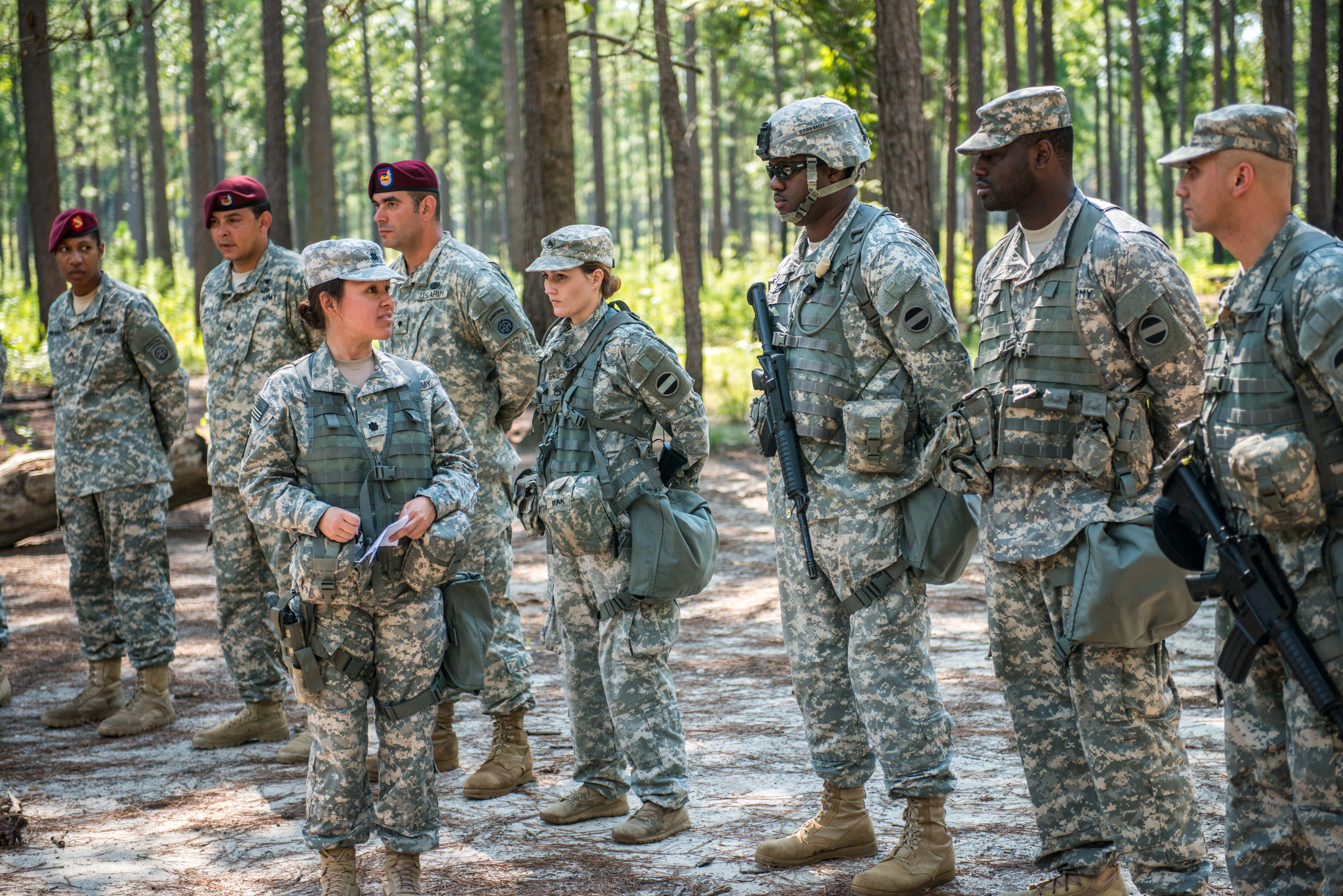
Lt. Col. Angela Funaro, the commander of the 10th Press Camp Headquarters, recognizes select personnel from her battalion and the 82nd Airborne Division during the 10th PCH's chemical, biological, radiological and nuclear training 11–15 Aug.. During the training, Soldiers of the 10th PCH received CBRN training and were introduced to the new M50 Field Protective Mask. The purpose of the training was to train Soldiers on the new protective mask while preparing the 10th PCH to assume the Defense CBRNE Reactionary Force mission in June 2015.

The 10th Public Affairs Detachment (Press Camp Headquarters) is a U.S. Army tactical, 31-person unit providing a battalion-level headquarters and is composed of public affairs and support professionals, commanded by a lieutenant colonel and command sergeant major.

The mission of the 10th PAD (PCH) is "on order, to deploy in support of Combatant Commander requirements across the spectrum of current and future operations to conduct Public Affairs operations and implement the information strategies of the supported commander in order to support civilian news media and facilitate news gathering efforts in the theater."

The 10th PAD (PCH) was originally activated in 1966 during the Vietnam War as the 10th Public Information Detachment. The 10th PID served with distinction prior to being inactivated in 1972, earning the Republic of Vietnam's Cross of Gallantry with Palm three times and the U.S. Army's Valorous Unit Award. The 10th was redesignated a Public Affairs Detachment in March 2004 and reactivated in October 2005. The unit was later deployed in support of Operation Iraqi Freedom and assumed the role of the Multi-National Force Iraq's Coalition Press Information Center (CPIC).

The 10th PAD(PCH)'s home station is Fort Bragg. The 10th is an element of the U.S. Army Forces Command (FORSCOM) and is not a permanent element of any division or corps.. The unit has a command cell, a headquarters section and an expeditionary section. Within the expeditionary section are four, five member teams each with an officer, two print journalists and two broadcasters. The 10th may also serve as headquarters for other public affairs units, such as Public Affairs Detachments (PADs) and Broadcast Operations Detachments (BODs). Although subordinate FORSCOM PA units (27th PAD, 49th PAD, 50th PAD and 22d MPAD) are technically attached, all work and deploy autonomously, meeting the demands of today's modular Army.

In 2009, elements of the 10th PAD (PCH) deployed forward in support of Joint Task Force Guantanamo Bay. Team GTMO was composed of Soldiers from the 10th Public Affairs Detachment (Press Camp Headquarters) from Fort Bragg; the 22d Mobile Public Affairs Detachment (MPAD) from Fort Bragg; and the 7th MPAD from Fort Hood. They provided Public Affairs Media relations support to Joint Task Force Guantanamo. They returned from the mission in January 2010.

The 10th PAD (PCH) deployed to Iraq again in August 2010, at the end of Operation Iraqi Freedom, and ushered in Operation New Dawn. They task organized under United States Forces-Iraq (USF-I), Strategic Communications directorate, where they relieved the 318th Public Affairs Operations Center in maintaining a CPIC.

The CPIC has four main functions: 1) credentialing and badging media covering troops and operations; 2) embedding media with units; 3) escorting media interacting with troops; 4) acquiring video and print/photo stories for dissemination to internal audiences (such as troops, DoD civilians and family members) and external audiences (such as the American public through social media and traditional media).

In October 2012, Soldiers of the 10th Press Camp Headquarters deployed to Joint Base McGuire-Dix-Lakehurst, N.J. and Fort Hamilton, N.Y., to support local, state and federal authorities responding to relief efforts after Hurricane Sandy swept the East Coast. The 10th PCH, on order, deploys anywhere in the United States to support federal, state and local agencies across the full spectrum of media operations, and during Hurricane Sandy Relief efforts they provided public affairs support, media facilitation and news coverage as part of Hurricane Sandy's severe weather response force. During the two-week Hurricane Sandy mission, more than thirty-five print, photo and video products were produced by the acquisition teams of the 10th PCH at Joint Base McGuire-Dix-Lakehurst, Fort Hamilton and the surrounding local areas.
