= Pan-African Ornithological Congress =

Conference on African ornithology

The Pan-African Ornithological Congress (PAOC) is a regular conference on African ornithology, usually held every four years at an African venue. Its geographic scope is:

...the entire continent from North Africa to the Cape of Good Hope, and east to the Suez Canal and Red Sea; the Cape Verde, Madeira and Canary islands; also isolated Atlantic Oceanic islands nearer Africa than South America, Antarctic islands south of Africa and the African-facing coast of Antarctica, the Seychelles, Comoros, Socotra, Mascarene Islands and Madagascar. All continental shelf islands (e.g. Zanzibar, Fernando Po — now Bioko) are considered areas of interest, as are areas of provenance and intervening routes of migratory birds that visit Africa.

Its aims and purposes are, with regard to African birds, to:

- Further their study
- Promote their preservation as an integral part of African heritage
- Foster their appreciation and discussion in relation to man, and
- Disseminate information about them through international meetings (Congresses) and publications (Proceedings)

The constitution also states: "Of vital importance to this scientific and educational organisation is the opportunity for free and open discussion of African avian biology, birds and their relations to man, and man’s effects on bird populations."

== History ==
The concept of holding a conference focussing on the African avifauna originated in an invitation by Cecily Niven, then President of the South African Ornithological Society (SAOS, later BirdLife South Africa), to the 11th International Ornithological Congress (IOC), in Basel, Switzerland, in 1954, to hold the 12th IOC in South Africa. Although the offer was not taken up at the time, it stimulated discussion about holding an independent conference on African birds, leading to the first PAOC in Livingstone, Northern Rhodesia, in 1957.

The first three congresses took place in southern Africa under the auspices of the SAOS, with the third (in Kruger National Park) largely organised by the Percy FitzPatrick Institute. Because of the political atmosphere pertaining to apartheid in South Africa at the time, no indigenous Africans participated in those meetings.

At the 16th IOC in Canberra, Australia, in 1974, several ornithologists suggested that the next PAOC should be held outside southern Africa, in order to give it a truly Pan-African dimension, and to encourage greater participation from other parts of Africa, including by indigenous Africans. Although PAOC 4 was due to be held in Kenya, the political atmosphere meant that many ornithologists from southern Africa would be unable to attend. Consequently, the meeting was moved to the Seychelles, making it the first to be held outside southern Africa, even though it did not take place on the African continent.

Subsequent congresses have been held throughout Africa. In 1988 PAOC became a permanent institution with the adoption of a constitution at PAOC 7 in Nairobi. The first francophone venue was Bujumbura, Burundi, in 1992, and the first North African venue the island of Djerba, Tunisia, in 2004. Subjects covered by the published proceedings show that, from the first to the eleventh congresses the number of papers on bird conservation topics increased considerably.

== List of congresses ==
1. 1957 – Livingstone, Northern Rhodesia
2. 1964 – Pietermaritzburg, South Africa
3. 1969 – Kruger National Park, South Africa
4. 1976 – Mahé, Seychelles
5. 1980 – Lilongwe, Malawi
6. 1985 – Francistown, Botswana
7. 1988 – Nairobi, Kenya
8. 1992 – Bujumbura, Burundi
9. 1996 – Accra, Ghana
10. 2000 – Kampala, Uganda
11. 2004 – Djerba, Tunisia
12. 2008 – Rawsonville, South Africa
13. 2012 – Arusha, Tanzania
14. 2016 – Dakar, Senegal
15. 2022 – Victoria Falls, Zimbabwe

== Congress Proceedings ==
- Rowan MK (ed) 1959. Proceedings of the First Pan-African Ornithological Congress, Livingstone, Southern Rhodesia, 15–19 July 1957. Ostrich Supplement 3.
- Broekhuysen GJ (ed) 1966. Proceedings of the Second Pan-African Ornithological Congress, Pietermaritzburg, Natal, 21–25 September 1964. Ostrich Supplement 6.
- Maclean GL (ed) 1971. Proceedings of the Third Pan-African Ornithological Congress, Pretoriuskop, Kruger National Park, 15–19 September 1969. Ostrich Supplement 8.
- Johnson DN (ed) 1980. Proceedings of the Fourth Pan-African Ornithological Congress, Mahé, Seychelles, 6–13 November 1976. Southern African Ornithological Society, Johannesburg, South Africa.
- Ledger JA (ed) 1984. Proceedings of the Fifth Pan-African Ornithological Congress, Lilongwe, Malawi, 1980. Southern African Ornithological Society, Johannesburg, South Africa.
- Backhurst GC (ed) 1988. Proceedings of the Sixth Pan-African Ornithological Congress, Francistown (Botswana) 1985. Sixth PAOC Committee, Nairobi, Kenya.
- Bennun L (ed) 1992. Proceedings of the Seventh Pan-African Ornithological Congress, Nairobi (Kenya) 1988. Seventh PAOC Committee, Nairobi, Kenya.
- Wilson RT (ed) 1993. Proceedings of the Eighth Pan-African Ornithological Congress, Bujumbura, Burundi, 30 September–5 October 1992. Koninklijk Museum voor Midden-Afrika Tervuren, Belgium, Annalen (Zoologische Wetenschappen) 268.
- Craig AJFK and Gordon C (eds) 2000. Proceedings of the Ninth Pan-African Ornithological Congress, Accra, Ghana, 1–7 December 1996. Ostrich 71(1–2).
- Lens L (ed) 2001. Proceedings of the Tenth Pan-African Ornithological Congress, Kampala, Uganda, 3–8 September 2000. Ostrich Supplement 15.
- Craig AJFK (ed) 2007. Proceedings of the 11th Pan-African Ornithological Congress, 2004. Ostrich 28(2): 115–553.
- Harebottle DM, Craig AJFK, Anderson MD, Rakotomanana H and Muchai (eds) 2009. Proceedings of the 12th Pan African Ornithological Congress, 2008. Cape Town, Animal Demography Unit.
