= Mobile Public Affairs Detachment =

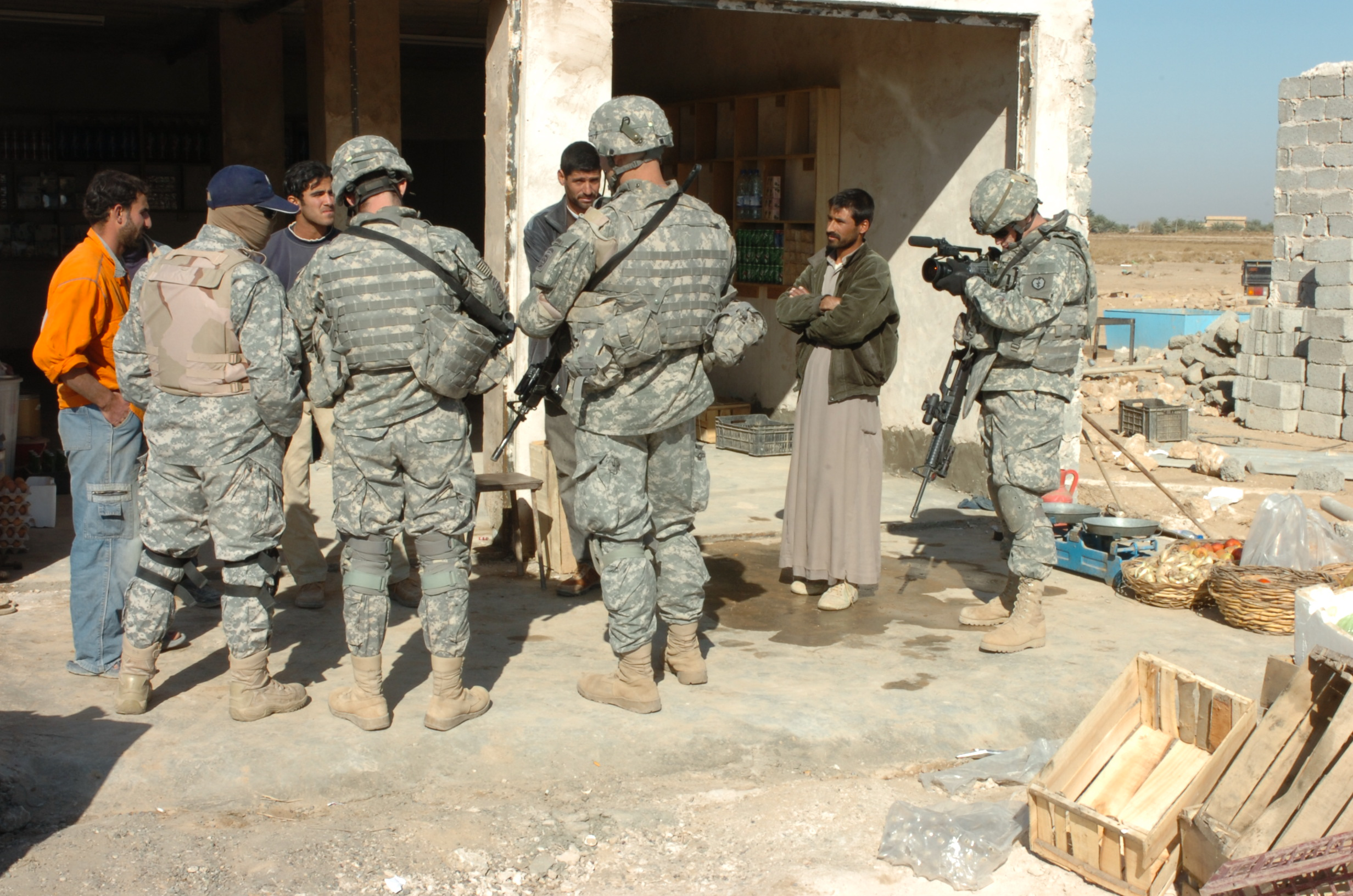
- A soldier from the 5th MPAD filming while on patrol in Iraq
- Country: United States
- Branch: U.S. Army
- Role: Public relations and internal publications
- Size: 20 Personnel

A Mobile public affairs detachment, or MPAD, is a public relations type of unit found in the United States Army.

== Background ==
A mobile public affairs detachment is a modular, task organizable unit that is assigned to a Division Headquarters, Corps Headquarters, Senior Army Sustainment Headquarters, Theater Army Headquarters or Unified Command. It provides direct Public Affairs support through planning, coordination, execution and supervision of expeditionary and campaign public affairs operations in support of Theater Army, joint, interagency, intergovernmental, and multinational and unified operations.

The MPAD is commanded by a major and includes up to 20 soldiers i.e. one First Sergeant and one Public Affairs Operations NCO, MOS 46Z, three captains, and thirteen Mass Communication Specialists and Sergeants, MOS 46S. MOS 46S replaced the 46R MOS and 46Q MOS in 2018. Enlisted grades include E-4 to E-8. In the Army Reserve, it includes one Public Affairs NCO as Active Guard Reserve (AGR) full-time support staff.

== Mission ==
MPADs are charged with gathering and distributing media to both internal and external audiences. They may be expected to produce either a newspaper, magazine, or a newscast. MPADs also serve to facilitate civilian media of all nationalities. They ensure the Army's policy of "maximum disclosure, minimum delay" is upheld. This is accomplished with press releases, response to queries, and by aiding media with travel, lodging, meals, and internet or phone connectivity. In addition, both the Army print and broadcast journalists within the MPAD distribute high quality video footage and print stories from their area of deployment to news organizations all over the world. Many of these are then used by these media organizations in their broadcasts and publications. The MPAD also records archival combat footage. Much of this footage is later used in civilian news or documentary programs.

The MPAD units represent an invaluable tool for division, corps or even theater commanders who are able to significantly augment their organic public affairs assets. Although often an independent and separately attached unit, the MPAD often falls within the authority of the division, corps or theater public affairs officer depending on which of these echelons they are attached to while deployed.

== Active duty units ==
There are currently four active duty MPADs. The 22nd MPAD is stationed in Fort Bragg, North Carolina, and until recently was the only active duty MPAD. The three newest MPADs were created to assist in the wake of the September 11 attacks and the Global War on Terror. They are the 5th MPAD, stationed in Fort Lewis, Washington, the 7th MPAD, stationed in Fort Cavazos, Texas, and the 16th MPAD, stationed in Fort Bliss, Texas.

== Army Reserve units ==
There are 16 MPADs in the Army Reserve. This does not include assets belonging to the Army National Guard.

Unit	Location
107th Mobile Public Affairs Detachment (Mobile) (107th MPAD)	Saint Augustine, Florida
210th Mobile Public Affairs Detachment (Mobile) (210th MPAD)	Cary, North Carolina
211th Mobile Public Affairs Detachment (Mobile) (211th MPAD)	Bryan, Texas
214th Mobile Public Affairs Detachment (Mobile) (214th MPAD)	Richmond, Virginia
215th Mobile Public Affairs Detachment (Mobile) (215th MPAD)	New Orleans, Louisiana
300th Mobile Public Affairs Detachment (Mobile) (300th MPAD)	Fort Gillem, Georgia
302nd Mobile Public Affairs Detachment (Mobile) (302nd MPAD)	Vallejo, California
305th Mobile Public Affairs Detachment (Mobile) (305th MPAD)	Fort Shafter, Hawaii
319th Mobile Public Affairs Detachment (Mobile) (319th MPAD)	Fort Jackson, South Carolina
326th Mobile Public Affairs Detachment (Mobile) (326th MPAD)	Reading, Pennsylvania
343rd Mobile Public Affairs Detachment (Mobile) (343rd MPAD)	North Little Rock, Arkansas
345th Mobile Public Affairs Detachment (Mobile) (345th MPAD)	Fort Sam Houston, Texas
354th Mobile Public Affairs Detachment (Mobile) (354th MPAD)	Moon Township, Pennsylvania
362nd Mobile Public Affairs Detachment (Mobile) (362nd MPAD)	Londonderry, New Hampshire
366th Mobile Public Affairs Detachment (Mobile) (366th MPAD)	Denver, Colorado
367th Mobile Public Affairs Detachment (Mobile) (367th MPAD)	Whitehall, Ohio
372nd Mobile Public Affairs Detachment (Mobile) (372nd MPAD)	Nashville, Tennessee
