= Beachmaster Unit Two =

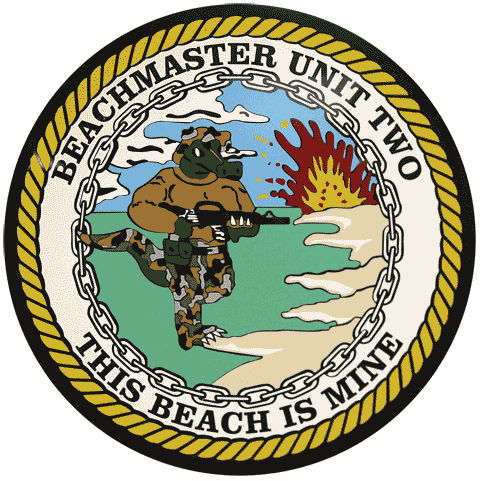
- BMU-2 Insignia
- Active: 1942–present
- Country: United States
- Branch: USN
- Part of: Naval Beach Group Two
- Garrison/HQ: NAB Little Creek
- Motto: "This Beach Is Mine"
- Engagements: World War II; Korean War; Vietnam War; Operation Desert Storm; Operation Enduring Freedom

Commanders
- Current commander: CDR Glenn Atherton

Beachmaster Unit Two (BMU-2) is a United States Navy amphibious beach party unit based at Naval Amphibious Base Little Creek in Little Creek, Virginia. Since 1949, BMU-2 has been involved in major amphibious exercises and operations in Lebanon, Cuba, Grenada, Desert Storm, Kosovo, and Afghanistan.

== Mission ==
Beachmaster Unit Two is assigned the mission of providing tactical components in support of amphibious operations. BMU-Two provides Naval Beach Party Teams (BPTs) for deployment in conjunction with Expeditionary Forces in order to provide beach and surf zone salvage and to facilitate the landing and movement over the beach of troops, equipment, supplies, and the evacuation of casualties, prisoners-of-war, and non-combatants.

== History ==
BMU-2 can trace its history back to the days of World War II. Early on during the Second World War, it quickly became apparent that the orderly flow of troops, equipment, and supplies across the assault beaches was an essential element to the success of amphibious operations. It also became obvious that some special organization was needed to effect and coordinate mass movement through the surf zone and onto the hostile shore. To accomplish this task, small units called Beach Party Teams were formed. They were trained at Naval Amphibious Base Little Creek in Virginia, and deployed commencing in September 1942. The Beach Party Battalions went forward to participate in amphibious landing in the European and African theaters.

In early September 2011 BMU-2 made its first ever air deployment to assist in the USS Bataan's ARG deployment.
