= Joint Expeditionary Base–Little Creek =

Base for the Amphibious Forces in the US Navy's Atlantic Fleet

Coordinates: 36°55′1.2″N 76°9′50.4″W

- Part of Joint Expeditionary Base Little Creek-Fort Story
- Virginia Beach, Virginia
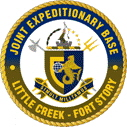
- Installation logo

Site information
- Type: Naval base
- Controlled by: United States Navy

Site history
- In use: 1942 – present

Joint Expeditionary Base–Little Creek (JEB–LC), formerly known as Naval Amphibious Base Little Creek and commonly called simply Little Creek, is the major operating base for the Amphibious Forces in the United States Navy's Atlantic Fleet. The mission of the Naval Amphibious Base is to provide required support services to over 15,000 personnel of the 27 homeported ships and 78 resident and/or supported activities. The base's combination of operational, support, and training facilities are geared predominantly to amphibious operations, making the base unique among bases of the United States and Allied Navies.

The Naval Amphibious Base Little Creek is the largest base of its kind in the world. It comprises four locations in three states, including almost 12,000 acres (4,900 ha) of real estate. Its Little Creek location in Virginia Beach, Virginia, totals 2,120 acres (860 ha) of land. Outlying facilities include 350 acres (140 ha) located just north of Training Support Center Hampton Roads in Virginia Beach and 21 acres (8.5 ha) known as Radio Island at Morehead City, North Carolina, used for U.S. Coast Guard ships and personnel as well as serving as an amphibious embarkation and debarkation area for U.S. Marine Corps units at Marine Corps Base Camp Lejeune, North Carolina. It is also home to the Naval School of Music.

On October 1, 2009, Little Creek and the U.S. Army's Fort Story completed a two-year merger into one joint base, officially named Joint Expeditionary Base Little Creek–Fort Story.

== History ==
=== World War II ===
On July 16, 1942, a U.S. Navy truck drove off Shore Drive, the scenic highway along the south shore of the Chesapeake Bay between the resort areas of Ocean View in Norfolk and Virginia Beach in Princess Anne County. The resort town was located on the shore of the Atlantic Ocean several miles south of Cape Henry, at the entrance to the bay. Near an inlet called "Little Creek", the truck stopped in a waterlogged bean field of the Whitehurst family's farm. For days thereafter, trucks loaded with lumber and equipment rolled into the area in almost continuous succession. The reason for this mass assault in a bean field 12 miles (19 km) northeast of Norfolk was that, early in World War II, Navy planners saw a necessity for landing large numbers of American troops on foreign shores in the face of enemy gunfire. That such operations would be difficult was also evident. New methods and techniques in landing troops would have to be developed. Training would be needed before sufficient men were proficient in the complicated art of the amphibious assault, which would enable U.S. troops to drive to the heart of the enemy.

The base was initially established in the farmland of Princess Anne County. During the early phases of World War II the base was a combination of farmland and swamps. Four bases were constructed on this area: Camp Bradford, Camp Shelton, U.S. Naval Frontier Base, and Amphibious Training Base. Camps Bradford and Shelton were named for the former owners of the land. Camp Bradford was a training base for Navy Seabees, but in 1943 it was changed into a training center for the crews of landing ship, tanks. Camp Shelton was an armed guard training center for bluejackets serving on board merchant ships as gun crews. At the end of World War II it served as a separation center. The Frontier Base was the forwarding center for amphibious force personnel and equipment destined for the European theater. The Amphibious Training Base (also known as "Little Creek") was the center for all types of amphibious training and the training of ship's crews for landing ship medium, landing craft infantry, and landing craft utility; landing craft mechanized and landing craft vehicle personnel boat crews were also trained at Little Creek.

In a few months, the trained men who were to land fighting forces from Africa to Normandy were ready for sea. During World War II, over 200,000 Naval personnel and 160,000 Army and Marine Corps personnel trained at Little Creek.

=== Post-World War II ===
The four bases were partially inactivated at the end of hostilities of World War II. Shortly thereafter, however, the bases at Little Creek, because of their central location on the Atlantic coast, excellent and varied beach conditions, proximity to the naval facilities of Norfolk, berthing facilities for amphibious ships through the size of LSTs, and other advantages, were consolidated into the present installation and renamed the Naval Amphibious Base, Little Creek with a commissioning date of August 10, 1945. It was designated a permanent base in 1946.

Growing over the years to meet the needs of the amphibious force, the base has developed into one of the most modern in the Navy. Thousands of men and women from all branches of the Armed Forces, as well as military students from foreign nations, now pass through the gates of the Naval Amphibious Base yearly for training in amphibious warfare. Today nearly 13,000 sailors, Marines, and civilian employees are assigned to the various stations or attend schools at the Naval Amphibious Base, Little Creek in support of the Navy/Marine Corps team.

== Tenant commands ==
=== Afloat commands ===
(As of August 2024)

- USS Gunston Hall (LSD-44)
- USS Tortuga (LSD-46)
- USS Carter Hall (LSD-50)
- USS Oak Hill (LSD-51)
- USCGC Vigorous (WMEC-627)
- USNS Spearhead

=== Major shore commands ===
- Explosive Ordnance Disposal Group Two
  - Explosive Ordnance Disposal Expeditionary Support Unit Two
  - Explosive Ordnance Disposal Mobile Unit Two
  - Explosive Ordnance Disposal Mobile Unit Six
  - Explosive Ordnance Disposal Mobile Unit Ten
  - Explosive Ordnance Disposal Mobile Unit Twelve
- Naval Beach Group Two
  - Assault Craft Unit Two
  - Assault Craft Unit Four
  - Beachmaster Unit Two
  - Amphibious Construction Battalion Two
- Naval Construction Force
  - 1st Naval Construction Division
  - Construction Battalion Maintenance Unit 202
- Naval Special Warfare Group TWO
  - SEAL Team 2 [ST2] (Worldwide)
  - SEAL Team 4 [ST4] (Worldwide)
  - SEAL Team 8 [ST8] (Worldwide)
  - SEAL Team 10 [ST10] (Middle East)
  - SEAL Delivery Vehicle Team 2 (SDV-2) (Atlantic Ocean, Europe and the Americas)
- Naval Special Warfare Group FOUR
  - Special Boat Team 12 [SBT-12] (Pacific & Middle East)
  - Special Boat Team 20 [SBT-20] (Europe, Mediterranean & Middle East)
  - Special Boat Team 22 [SBT-22] (Worldwide)
- Naval Special Warfare Group ELEVEN
  - SEAL Team 18 (Reserve)
- Tactical Air Control Squadron Twenty One
- Tactical Air Control Squadron Twenty Two
- Underwater Construction Team One

=== Other tenants ===
- Navy Reserve Center Norfolk
- Marine Corps Reserve Center Norfolk
- Board of Inspection and Survey
- U.S. Armed Forces School of Music, which trains professional musicians for service with the U.S. military bands of the Army, Navy and Marine Corps, but not the Air Force or Coast Guard
- Coast Guard MSRT 91102
- Coast Guard Little Creek Station

== Ferry Road ==
The base remains bisected by a finger of land not part of the base. The land includes Ferry Road, a rail line, and the docks serving former cross-bay rail barge traffic of the defunct Bay Coast Railroad, formerly the Eastern Shore Railroad, to Cape Charles, Virginia. Ferry Road, crossed by the base's Guam Road-Amphibious Drive bridge, once served the defunct Little Creek-Cape Charles Ferry which transported passengers and motor vehicles across the mouth of the bay to Cape Charles and Kiptopeke until replacement in 1964 by the Chesapeake Bay Bridge-Tunnel.

See: Ferry Road bisecting NABLC
