= Public Affairs Operations Center =

Type of public affairs unit in the U.S. Army

A public affairs operations center is one of the four types of public affairs units in the United States Army. In function and size, the closest equivalent is a battalion headquarters. Informally known as press camp headquarters, PAOCs are corps- or theater-level public affairs units tasked with providing press camp services and facilities to accredited members of the media in support of combined operations and joint operations. In addition to providing workspace and services, the PAOC provides command and control staff, planning and supervision of operations performed by subordinate public affairs units. The PAOC is also responsible for registering and escorting news media representatives, assisting in deploying media pools and coordinating logistical support for a media operations center.

In 2005, the United States Army stood up its first active duty component PAOC, the 10th Public Affairs Operations Center 10th Press Camp Headquarters, in Atlanta, Georgia. The unit is now stationed at Fort Bragg (North Carolina). There are seven reserve component public affairs operations centers.
