= Logistics Support Area =

In the United States Army, a Logistics Support Area (LSA) is a military term which refers to military facilities which act as depot, barracks, and transportation hubs, providing supplies and personnel to facilities closer to or within arenas of armed conflict. Although the term has been used by the armed forces of a number of nations, currently the term is most closely associated with the largest of former American bases in Iraq, established during Operation Iraqi Freedom (OIF). Within that context, the LSAs acted both as division headquarters, major depots, fixed wing air bases, and rest and recreation areas supporting the Forward Operating Bases (FOB) from which most military operations emanated.

Within Iraq, the LSAs were:

- LSA Adder, near Nasiriyah
- LSA Anaconda, near Balad
- LSA Diamondback, at Mosul Airbase
- LSA Viper, near the Jalibah Southeast airfield, 65 km from Nasiriyah (Dhi Qar)

While not listed as an LSA in the OIF order of battle, the enormous Baghdad International Airport facility filled a similar function.

== See also ==
- Occupation of Iraq (2003–2011)

== Notes and references ==
- Globalsecurity.org, Iraq Occupation and Reconstruction, US Facilities
