= Joint Expeditionary Base Little Creek–Fort Story =

US Army and Navy base in Virginia

Joint Expeditionary Base Little Creek - Fort Story
- Part of Navy Region Mid-Atlantic
- Virginia Beach, Virginia
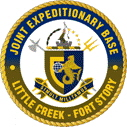
- Command logo

Site information
- Type: Joint base
- Controlled by: United States Navy
- Sub-installations: Fort Story; NAB Little Creek
- Website: JEBLCFS website

Site history
- In use: 2005 - present

Garrison information
- Current commander: CAPT David L. Gray JEBLCFS Commander; CMDR William D. Dougher JEBLCFS Executive Officer; LTC Pierre N. Han JEBLCFS Deputy Commander & Army Garrison Commander

Joint Expeditionary Base Little Creek–Fort Story (JEBLC-FS), established October 1, 2009, is a joint base of the United States military that is located in Virginia Beach, Virginia. The installation is made up of former U.S Army post Fort Story and Naval Amphibious Base Little Creek. It was created as the result of the Base Realignment and Closure, 2005 process. It is commanded by the United States Navy.

== Little Creek ==
Joint Expeditionary Base Little Creek is the major operating base for the expeditionary forces in the United States Navy's Atlantic Fleet. The base comprises four locations in three states, including almost 12,000 acres (4,900 ha) of real estate. Its Little Creek location in Virginia Beach, Virginia, totals 2,120 acres (860 ha) acres of land. Outlying facilities include 350 acres (140 ha) located just north of Training Support Center Hampton Roads in Virginia Beach and 21 acres (8.5 ha) known as Radio Island at Morehead City, North Carolina, used as an amphibious embarkation/debarkation area for U.S. Marine Corps units at Marine Corps Base Camp Lejeune, North Carolina.

== Fort Story ==
Fort Story is located in Virginia Beach at Cape Henry at the entrance of the Chesapeake Bay.^{[2]} It offers a unique combination of features including dunes, beaches, sand, surf, deep-water anchorage, variable tide conditions, maritime forest and open land. The base is the prime location and training environment for both Army amphibious operations and Joint Logistics Over-the-Shore (JLOTS) training events.

The base includes 1,451 acres (5.87 km^{2}) of sandy trails, cypress swamps, maritime forest, grassy dunes and soft and hard sand beaches. The western beaches are wide, gently sloped and washed by the waters of the Chesapeake Bay. Eastern beaches are exposed to the rougher waters of the Atlantic surf.

== Education ==
Virginia Beach City Public Schools is the local school district. There are no Department of Defense Education Activity (DoDEA) schools on these properties nor in any in the Hampton Roads area.
