= Naval Mobile Construction Battalion Seven =

Naval Mobile Construction Battalion 7
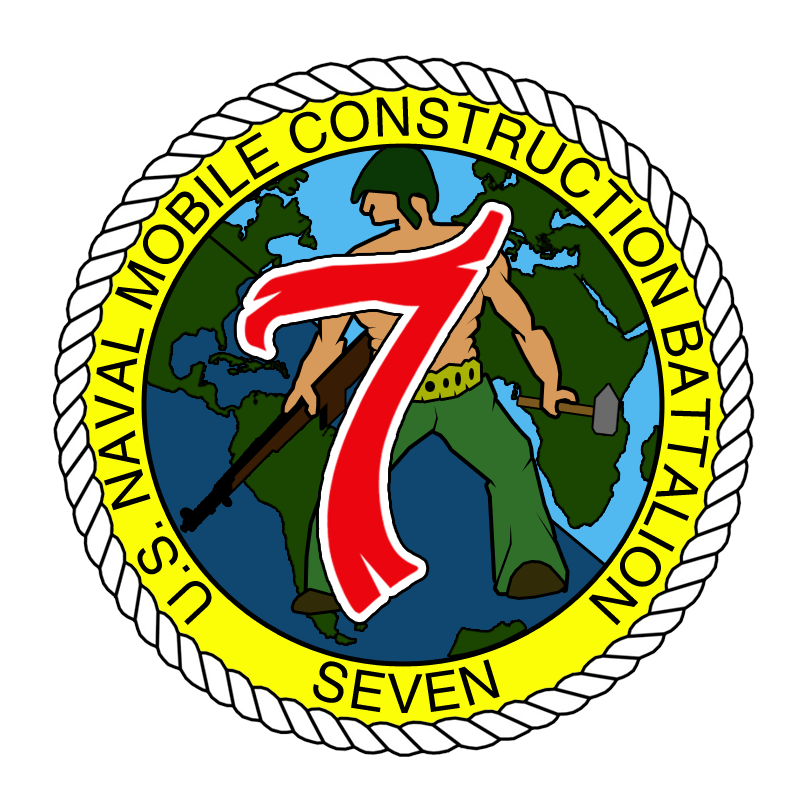
- Naval Mobile Construction Battalion SEVEN insignia
- Active: 17 June 1942 – 30 October 1945; 22 August 1951 – 31 August 1970; 1 August 1985 – 5 September 2012
- Country: United States
- Branch: USN
- Size: 600
- Part of: 1st Naval Construction Division
- Homeport: NCBC Gulfport
- Nickname: "Magnificent Seven"
- Mottos: "Construimus, Batuimus" (We Build, We Fight)
- Engagements: World War II; Vietnam War; Operation Desert Shield; Operation Enduring Freedom; Operation Iraqi Freedom

Naval Mobile Construction Battalion SEVEN (NMCB 7) was a Navy Seabee battalion last homeported at Naval Construction Battalion Center, Gulfport Mississippi. Nicknamed the "Magnificent Seven", it is one of the first ten Naval Construction Battalions formed by the U.S. Navy in 1942.

== History ==
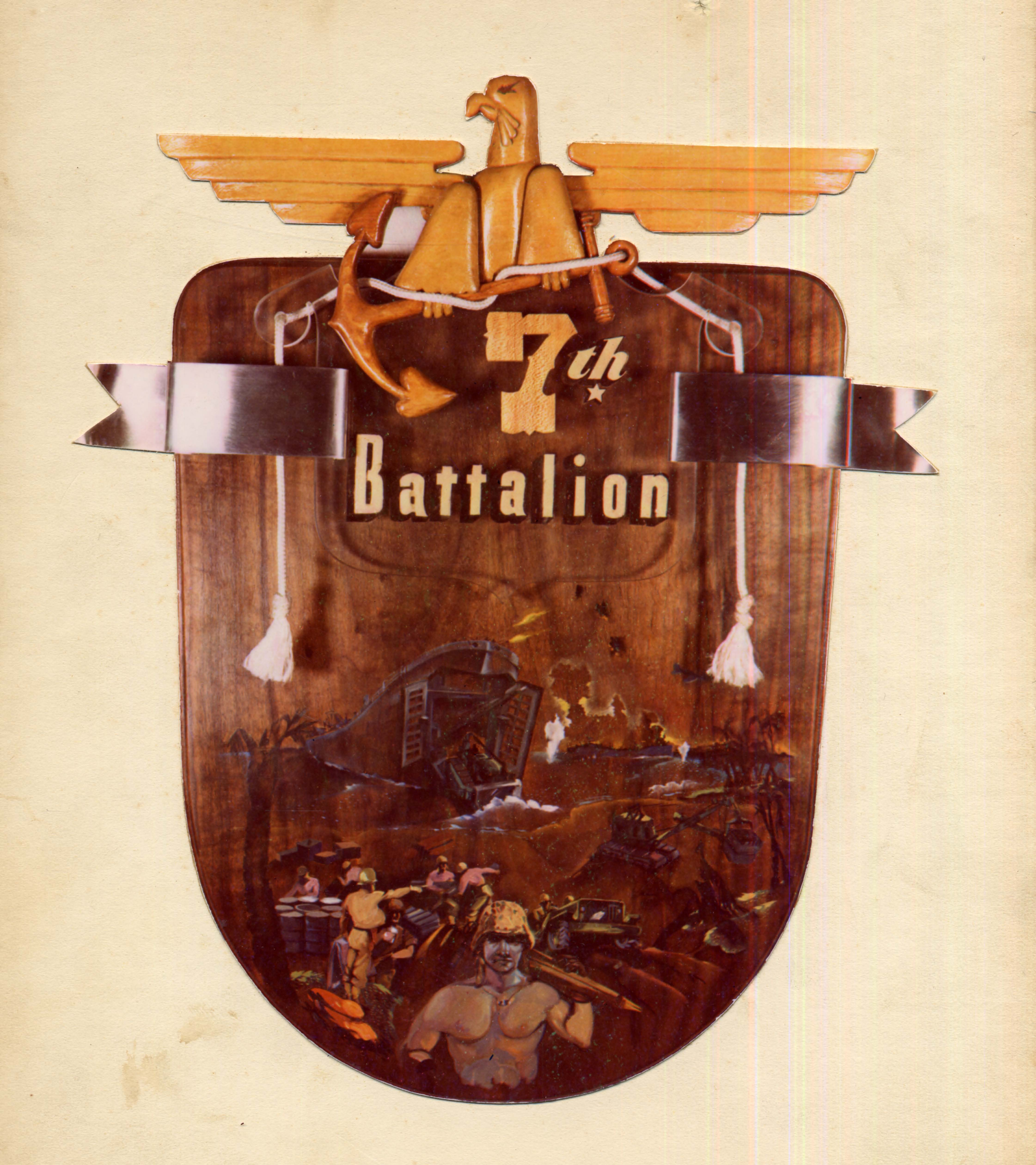
Naval Construction Battalion 7 first unit insignia

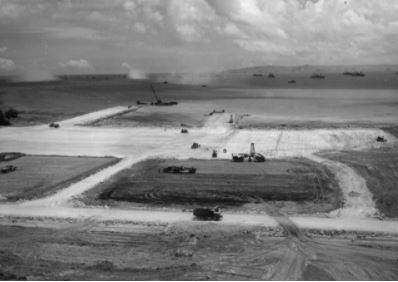
USN 325972 Seaplane Base at Okinawa being constructed by CB 7

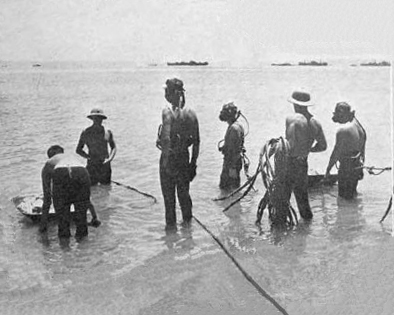
CB 7 Divers working on Okinawa seaplane ramp

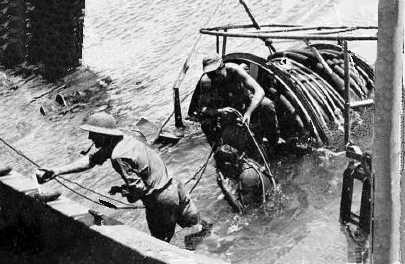
CB 7 diver working on the salvage of a minesweeper

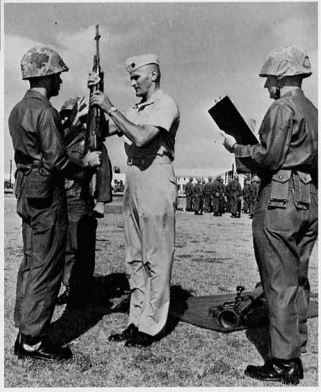
USMC field inspection at Camp Lejeune for MCB 7 in 1965

United States Naval Construction Battalion 7 (NCB 7) was commissioned on 17 June 1942 at the Naval Construction Training Center, Camp Allen, Norfolk, Virginia, under the command of Commander Julius L. Piland, CEC, USNR.

WWII through 1970s

During World War II, NCB 7 made two deployments. The first was to Samoa and Espiritu Santo, New Hebrides. They had only been at Pago Pago, Samoa eight days when they were ordered forward to Espiritu Santo. The battalion arrived in August and constructed an airfield in 60 days. They were then tasked with two more as well as a large naval base. One field was for fighters the other two were for bombers. For the Naval Station they constructed 12 docks, 2 hospitals and 19 communications towers, In addition they built camps for eight other units, plus 42 miles of roadway with two bridges. The second deployment went to Iroquois Point, Hawaii Territory where the Seabees built themselves a camp consisting of four fully self contained 1000 man compounds for battalions. From there CB 7 transitioned forward via Saipan, in the Marianas to Buckner Bay Okinawa. There the battalion had two large projects. The first was a docking facility that could handle the simultaneous offloading of multiple ships. The second was a major seaplane base. An atypical assignment was the battalions divers salvaging a minesweeper that had been sunk by Fukuryu swimmers or "kamikaze frogmen". The battalion was decommissioned on 30 October 1945 in Okinawa.

On 22 August 1951, MCB 7 was commissioned for a second time at the U.S. Naval Yards and Docks Supply Depot in Davisville, Rhode Island, under the command of Lieutenant Commander Robert F. Smart, CEC USNR. Seabee battalions assigned to the Atlantic fleet did not deploy to the Korean conflict. The battalion's first two deployments were back to back to Naval Air Station Port Lyautey, Morocco.

From October 1957 to August 1959, MCB 7 set a record by remaining deployed to three islands in the West Indies, completing the largest construction project ever undertaken by a peace time Atlantic Construction Battalion, two complete Coast Guard LORAN Stations.

In 1961 the battalion was ordered to Naval Base Guantanamo Bay, Cuba in support of the base's Marine security force during the Cuban Missile Crisis. Along with the defensive preparations, MCB 7 teamed with MCB 4 constructing more than 20 miles of perimeter roads and other base facilities in record time. The Battalion was selected "Best of Type" in the Atlantic Fleet and awarded the Battle Efficiency "E" for fiscal year 1963.

In 1965 the battalion's deployment was split with the first half at Naval Station Rota and the second half in 1966 at Huế and Phu Bai in Republic of South Vietnam. Danang East was home to the main body in 1967–68 at Camp Adenir. Besides fielding Seabee teams the battalion sent a 28-man detachment the Royal Thai Air Force Base, at Nakhon Phanom, Thailand that deployment. The 1969-70 deployment took NMCB 7 to the combat base at Chu Lai. In August 1970 the battalion was decommissioned at the Construction Battalion Center, Davisville, Rhode Island.

While in Vietnam CB 7 had eight Seabee teams all in the south and Mekong Delta.

- 0701 1967 Diên Khánh
- 0701 1968 Phan Rang
- 0702 1967 Tân An base camp
- 0703 1968 Sóc Trăng
- 0704 1968. Gò Công
- 0705 1968. Thủ Đức
- 0706 1969. Lái Thiêu
- 0707 1969. Rạch Giá
- 0708 1969. Soc Trang

=== 1980s through 2010s ===
NMCB 7 was commissioned for a third time on 1 August 1985 aboard Naval Construction Battalion Center Gulfport, Mississippi under the command of CDR C. David Binning, CEC USNR. The commissioning marked the first time in over 17 years that a new construction battalion had been brought on line. In December 1985, following the completion of a rigorous homeport, NMCB 7 made preparations for their first deployment as a recommissioned unit. The main body deployed to Naval Station Rota Spain with details sent to Bermuda, Greece, Crete, Scotland, Italy, and Germany.

On 8 August 1990, the Battalion was ordered to mobilize for redeployment to the Middle East in direct support of Operation Desert Shield. All details except for the Civic Action Team were rolled back to Okinawa within 72-hours. On 10 September, the Air Detachment departed Kadena Air Force Base, Okinawa for the Middle East to begin setting up Camp Sierra India Bravo, followed by the advance party on 29 September, and the main body on 10 October.

From 1991 through 2002 NMCB 7 completed ten deployments to Naval Station Rota, Spain; Roosevelt Roads Naval Station, Puerto Rico, Guam, and Camp Shields, Okinawa.

In 2003, NMCB 7 deployed to Southwest Asia in support of Operation Iraqi Freedom. The Battalion supported Marine units by constructing roads and maintaining camps throughout Kuwait and Iraq. NMCB Seven supported combat operations by maintaining main and alternate supply routes and jointly constructing the longest NCF constructed Mabey-Johnson bridge at Az Zubidayah. For its extraordinary heroism and outstanding performance of duty in action against enemy forces from March – April 2003 in support of Operation Iraqi Freedom, NMCB Seven was awarded the Presidential Unit Citation.

In 2005 NMCB 7 provided the initial response to Hurricane Katrina and was the first unit to provide disaster recovery support. In the aftermath of Katrina, NMCB Seven was tasked with many key projects assisting the Mississippi Gulf Coast recovery from the massive devastation. The Battalion assisted the Coast Guard, Gulfport Sheriff's Department, and Fish and Wildlife Commission gaining access to water assets in order to conduct search and rescue operations. The scope soon expanded to include demolition of old buildings, clearing railroad tracks around the Port of Gulfport, and building temporary shelters for fuel tanks. In all, NMCB 7 removed 250 damaged trees, 3000 tons of steel and scrap metal, and 600 tons of other debris.

NMCB 7 was selected as the Atlantic Fleet Naval Construction Force Battle Efficiency "E" winner.

In February 2006 NMCB 7 deployed to Kuwait, CENTCOM AOR, and other locations in direct support of the global war on terrorism (GWOT). The battalion was on 4 continents, in 13 countries, at 25 work sites.

In June 2007, NMCB 7 deployed to Okinawa, Japan operating the main body from Camp Shields. The majority of NMCB Seven's Seabees were located in the U.S. Pacific Command (PACOM) area of operations, from San Clemente Island on the California coast to Diego Garcia in the Indian Ocean. An additional 50 Seabees from NMCB 7 were detached to the U.S. Central Command (CENTCOM) in Afghanistan.

On 1 October 2008, NMCB 7 deployed to Al Taqaddum, Iraq and various other locations, including some smaller detachments in Afghanistan. From there, they began the turnover process once again with NMCB 3. In December 2008, NMCB 7 received orders to redeploy to Camp Bastion in Helmand Province, Afghanistan to construction the new base code named Tombstone 1 which eventually became Camp Leatherneck, the headquarters of the 2nd Marine Expeditionary Brigade. NMCB 7 also pushed out multiple detachments in preparation for joint spring offenses including Camp Dwyer.

In January 2010, NMCB 7 Air-Det was dispatched to Port-au-Prince, Haiti to assist with disaster relief amidst the devastation 7.0 earthquake that struck the country. A month later, the battalion deployed to multiple work sites throughout Europe, Africa, and South America as part of its scheduled 2010 deployment providing contingency construction, humanitarian and civic assistance and recreation related construction projects. By the end of deployment, the battalion had successfully completed projects in 33 sites in Africa, Eastern Europe, the Mediterranean, Central and South America. The Battalion had more than 120 Seabees continually assigned to Combined Joint Task Force Horn of Africa (CJTF-HOA) at Camp Lemonnier, Djibouti, as an enduring Detachment, with smaller Detachments completing projects in Kenya, Comoros, Ethiopia, and the Djibouti countryside.

=== Decommissioning ===
On 5 September 2012, Naval Mobile Construction Battalion 7 was decommissioned at CBC Gulfport, Mississippi. Joining CDR. James G. Meyer, last Battalion commander, were the Commander 1st Naval Construction Division (1 NCD) RADM Mark A. Handley qs well as the Commander Naval Facilities Engineering Command (NAVFAC), RADM Christopher J. Mossey for the decommissioning.

== See also ==
- Admiral Ben Moreell
- Amphibious Construction Battalion One (ACB-1)
- Amphibious Construction Battalion TWO (ACB-2)
- Civil Engineer Corps United States Navy
- Naval Construction Battalion aka Seabee
- Seabees in World War II
- Naval Amphibious Base Little Creek
- Naval Amphibious Base Coronado
- Naval Construction Battalion Center (Gulfport, Mississippi)
- Naval Construction Battalion Center Port Hueneme
- Naval Mobile Construction Battalion 1
- Naval Mobile Construction Battalion 3
- Naval Mobile Construction Battalion 4
- Naval Mobile Construction Battalion 11
- Naval Mobile Construction Battalion 25
- Naval Mobile Construction Battalion 26
- Naval Mobile Construction Battalion 40
- Naval Mobile Construction Battalion 133
