= Naval Mobile Construction Battalion 40 =

American military unit

Naval Mobile Construction Battalion FORTY
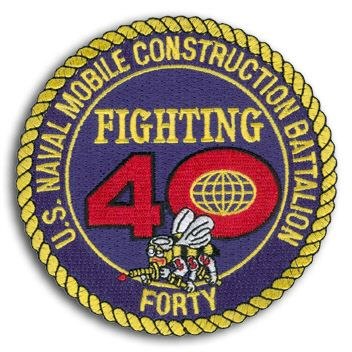
- Active: 6 November 1942 – 28 November 1945; 1 February 1966 – 12 September 2012
- Country: United States
- Branch: United States Navy
- Part of: 31st Seabee Readiness Group
- homeport: Davisville, RI moved to Port Hueneme, CA in the mid 70s: Naval Construction Battalion Center Port Hueneme
- Engagements: World War II; Vietnam War; Gulf War; Operation Enduring Freedom; Operation Iraqi Freedom

Naval Mobile Construction Battalion FORTY (NMCB 40), nicknamed Fighting FORTY, was a US Navy Seabee Battalion based out of Port Hueneme, California. Its primary mission was wartime contingency construction as well as peacetime construction and disaster relief.

== History ==
=== WWII ===
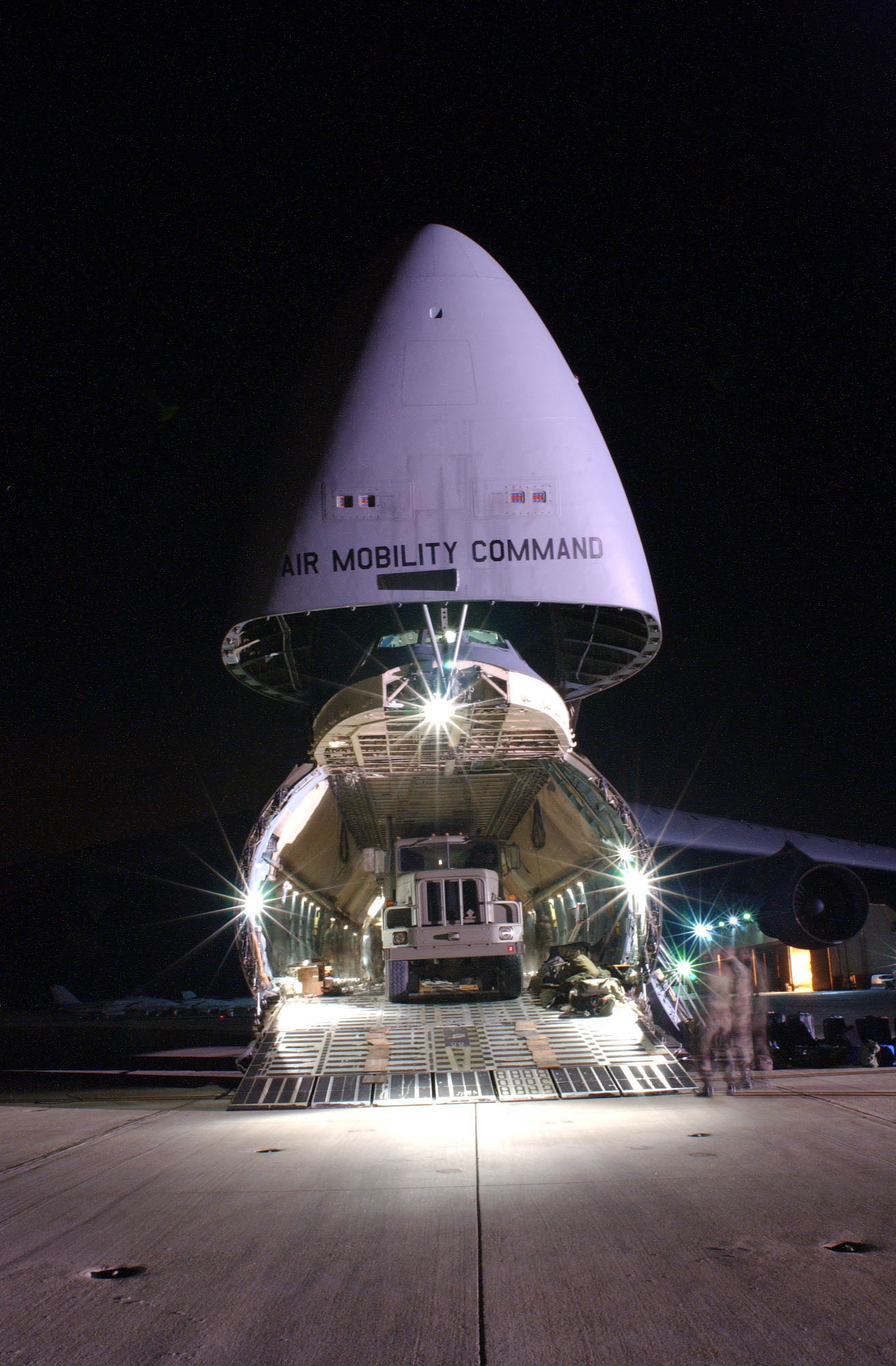
US Navy 021213-N-1485H-001 Seabees of NMCB 40 load equipment onto an Air Mobility Command (AMC) C-5 "Galaxy" cargo plane

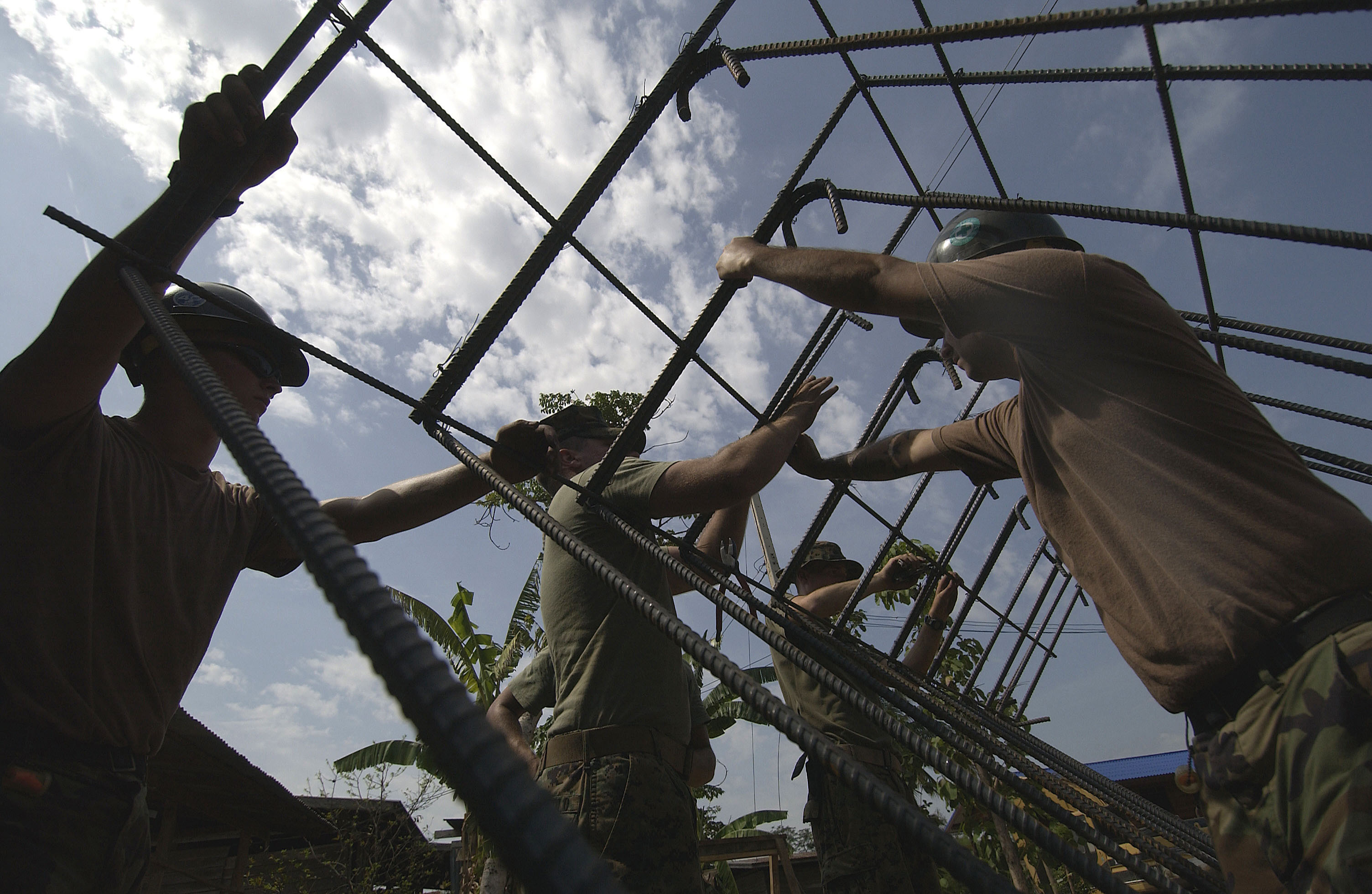
Defense.gov News Photo 050417-F-7823A-027 U.S. Marine Corps Engineers and U.S. Navy Seabees work alongside members of the Thai Army to raise a framework of rebar as they build a bridge in Ban Jingteenuean, Thailand, during Exercise Cobra Gold 05 on 17 April 2005. The Marines are from the 9th Engineer Support Battalion and the Seabees are from NMCB 40.

On 6 November 1942 the battalion was commission at Camp Allen, Va. The battalion's first deployment was to Espiritu Santo to build Lion 1. Included on the project list was the construction of an airstrip . This project along with additional support facilities were completed in 1943. Los Negros was the next island X where 40 CB was attached to the U.S. Army's 1st Cavalry. The Seabees of 40 were assigned a portion of the defensive perimeter and came under fierce attack. That attack lead to the battalions nickname "Fighting Forty". After the attack 40 returned to rehabilitating the airstrip which they had in use within two days. Momote airfield became operational on 18 May 1944 and remains in use today. It became Hq for the 13th Air Force and had RAF elements from both New Zealand and Australia stationed there. General MacArthur put the battalion up for the Distinguished Unit Ribbon which the President gave them for their part in the battle. In 1944, FORTY returned home, regrouped and deployed again in late 1944. Port calls were made at Pearl Harbor, T.H., Eniwetok Island; and Tanapag, Saipan. In 1945, the week after Easter, the battalion sailed for Okinawa. There it immediately began the work of rebuilding the island's main supply routes. While doing that, the battalion had to fight Japanese forces and endure two major typhoons. At the end of World War II, 40 CB joined the ranks of the other CBs when it was decommissioned on 28 November 1945 for the post-war draw-down.

The 40th earned the Army's WWII equivalent of the Presidential unit citation on Los Negros Island while attached to the 1st Cavalry Division. Special mention was made of the bulldozers going into the teeth of the enemies positions on 2 March 1944. Ref. Battle Honors citation dated 5 July 1944 by order of G. C. Marshall and signed by James Alexander Ulio, Major General, Adjutant General.

Unbeknownst to the Battalion the seaplane base they created at Tanapag would survive the War and become a training facility for the CIA that would eventually include all of the island north of the Tanapag base.

=== Reactivation and Vietnam ===
In 1966 MCB FORTY was reactivated for deployment to Chu Lai, Vietnam. The first assignment was in support of advance base operations of the 3rd Marine Amphibious Force. FORTY built ammunition magazines and maintained main supply routes during that deployment. The battalion returned to Vietnam for two additional tours. In October 1967 it went back to Camp Shields in Chu Lai and to Camp Campbell in Phu Bai, December 1968. In 1968 the Navy changed Construction from MCBs to NMCBs.

- Seabee team 4001 - Lai Thieu, October 1967 – June 1968
- Seabee team 4002 - Go Cong, March–August 1968
- Seabee team 4004 - Xuan Loc, March–November 1970
- Seabee team 4006 - Tan An, May 1971 – January 1972

=== 1970s, Cold War ===
In the 1970s NMCB 40 was to play a key role in the "Cold War" as well as a continuing participation in the "hot war" of Vietnam. On 9 March 1971 the first units of NMCB 40 were deployed to the small British atoll island of Diego Garcia in the middle of the Indian Ocean. Their mission was to construct a high priority communications station and airfield "from scratch" in the same manner as the Seabees did in the island hopping days of World War II. All support was to be "over the beach." This key base was needed to counter a growing Soviet presence in the Indian Ocean, and was constructed under the watching eyes of Soviet warships. A communications station was in operation on 25 March, establishing for the first time worldwide US Navy communications, and an operational runway was completed on 15 July 1971 provided the first US airfield in the Indian Ocean, three days ahead of schedule, earning the personal praise of the Chief of Naval Operations Admiral E. R. Zumwalt Jr., and the Navy E for "Best of Type." The construction of this remote base changed the balance of power in the Indian Ocean from the Soviet Union to the United States. NMCB Forty was the pioneer battalion for the beginning of what was to become the largest Seabee construction project in history. Seabee battalion deployments would go on for eleven more years, with detachments continuing to the present. NMCB Forty deployed back to the Diego Garcia in 1980.

=== 1990s to 2010s ===
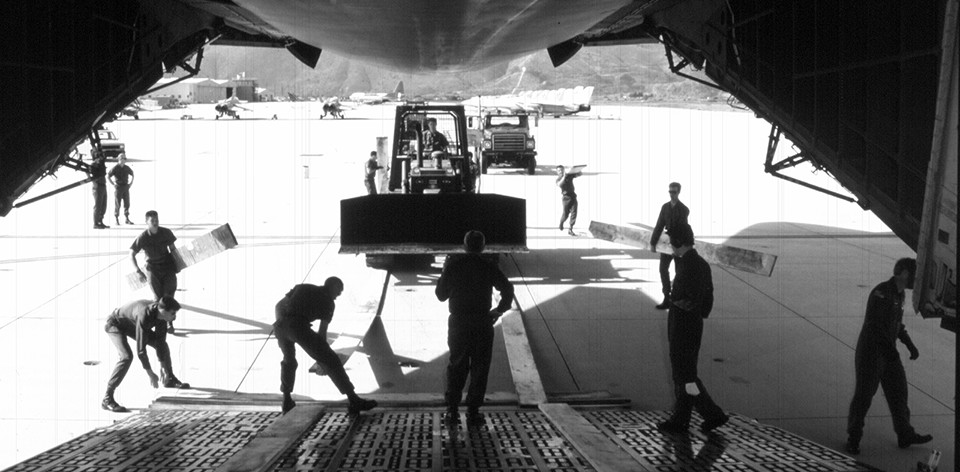
Seabees of Naval Mobile Construction Battalion 40 at Mogadishu, Somalia December 1992

In August 1990, after Saddam Hussein's Iraqi forces invaded Kuwait, the battalion was called from its deployment site in Guam to support I MEF and II MEF in Saudi Arabia. FORTY participated in the II MEF bed-down. The largest multi-battalion contingency operation in twenty years. In 36 days Seabees placed over 20,700 cubic meters of concrete and built six separate camps to house 25,000 Marines. In support of Marine Aircraft Group 16, NMCB FORTY prepared 1,500,000 square feet (140,000 m^{2}) of aircraft parking, fueling taxiways and maintenance hangar pads.

The first nine-man team arrived on 10 December 1992 followed by the heavy "Det" two weeks later and the battalion main body one month later. NMCB FORTY provided expeditious construction support to the forces of Operation Restore Hope in Somalia including the construction school houses in the south, road clean-up, construction of schools, sanitary clean-up, assistance of Operations for the US Army, US Air Force, Canadian Air Force, Italian Army, French Army, Botswana Defence Force, Egyptian Army, Kenya Army, and Turkish Army. Logistical support in and around downtown Mogadishu, and the surrounding camps around the countryside that are the base of restoration of basic human needs to the lives of the natives Somalis for their day to day existence. in northern Somalia "Fighting FORTY" aided the Somalis through the construction and repair of schools and orphanages and many other basic life support needs.

Midway through its 1996 European Deployment, NMCB 40 was redeployed to Bosnia and Herzegovina in support of Operation Joint Endeavor, re-calling five separate detachments and a Water Well Drilling Team operating out of Turkey, including its main body stationed in Rota, Spain. Mount-out and embarkation via ship, rail, line-haul, and the air was complex. NMCB FORTY planned and operated with the Army's 1st Armored Division Implementation Force (IFOR) to close and disestablish fourteen base camps ahead of schedule. All operations in the formidably-hostile environment of the Bosnia Posavina Corridor were done tactically with weapons at the ready. Logging over 256 tactical convoys covering more than 220,000 vehicle miles within a 75-day operation. FORTY completed camp deconstructions and provided contingency construction support for nineteen critical force projects—enabling enforcement of the Dayton Peace Accord.

In 2003, "Fighting FORTY" was called to support Operation Enduring Freedom and Iraqi Freedom. Home ported in Port Hueneme, Ca. during the hostilities, NMCB FORTY aided its sister battalions deployed to Southwest Asia through massive embarkation operations of nearly 9.6 million pounds of construction equipment from California to Kuwait for ongoing combat operations. In August 2003, the battalion's Air Detachment redeployed from Okinawa directly to Southwest Asia to support ongoing global war on terrorism operations in Kuwait, Iraq, and Afghanistan.

In December 2004 the battalion deployed to the Pacific theater of operations. The battalion completed numerous construction projects at the main body site in Okinawa and other locations throughout Japan, including Atsugi, Fuji, Iwakuni, and Sasebo. There were also detail sites in Pohang and Chinhae, South Korea, Diego Garcia, and San Clemente Island. Within a month of deployment, a group of 50 Seabees responded to the devastating tsunami that struck Southeast Asia, conducting critical engineering assessments on government facilities and airfields. They also supervised the construction of tension fabric structures and supported runway working parties that delivered relief supplies to the people of Indonesia. Additionally, the battalion participated in the Deployment-for-Training (DFT) Cobra Gold, promoting inter-operability between the nations' military components. Finally, the battalion deployed Seabees in support of a Joint Task Force exercise, New Horizons 2005, to provide humanitarian construction and engineering operations for the nation of Panama.

In September 2005, "Fighting FORTY" conducted humanitarian relief, clearing, and construction operations for the citizens of greater New Orleans, Louisiana and Gulfport, Mississippi following the devastation brought on by Hurricane Katrina. Under arduous conditions and with limited resources, NMCB 40 employed resourcefulness, ingenuity, and technical expertise to provide immeasurable relief and accelerated recovery in the affected region.

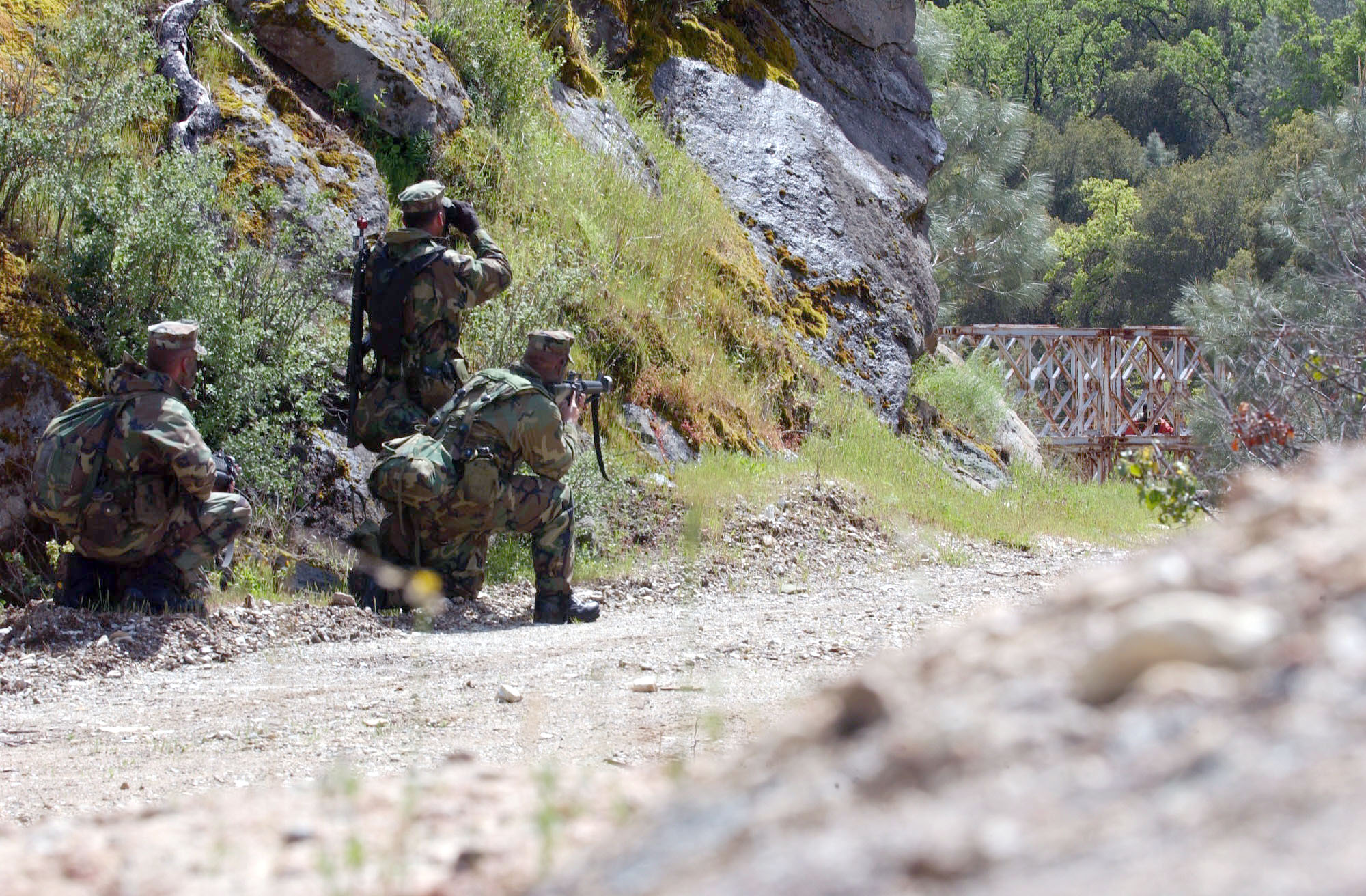
US Navy 030412-N-1485H-009 A Seabee Engineer Reconnaissance Team (SERT) from NMCB 40 determine if bridge can be used to support troop and convoy movements during a field exercise

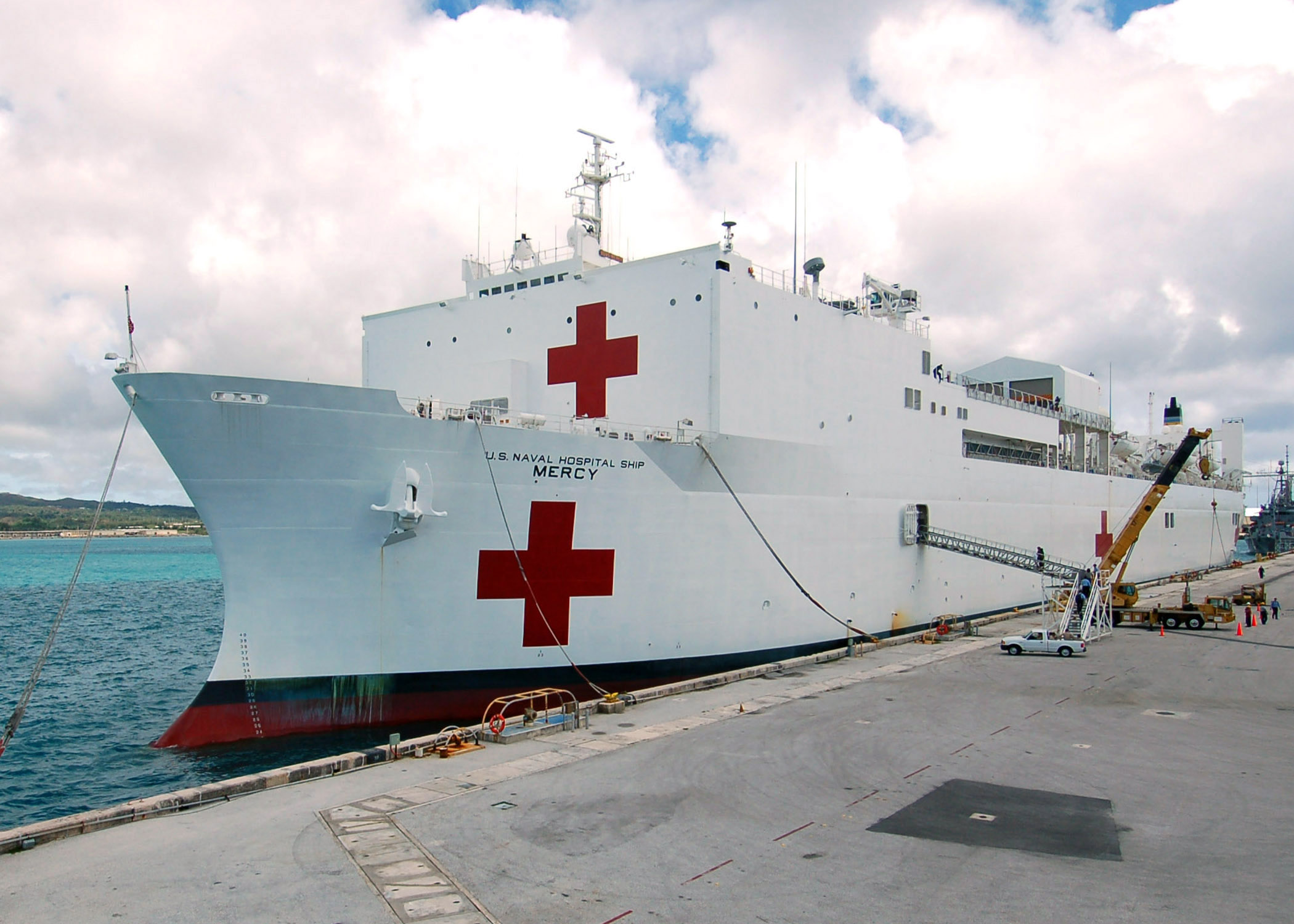
US Navy 050615-N-3532C-004 The Military Sealift Command hospital ship USNS Mercy (T-AH 19) makes a one-day stop to give the crew a break and pick up Naval Mobile Construction Battalion Four Zero (NMCB-40)

In April 2006, NMCB 40 deployed to Guam and Southwest Asia, executing peacetime global contingency construction operations including operations in Iraq and Afghanistan supporting OIF, There were detachment sites in Guam, Whidbey Island, Wash., Palau, Thailand, and aboard the USNS Mercy. In the end, the battalion completed over 42,000 man-days of safe, high quality construction throughout the Pacific and Central Command Theaters of Operation, resulting in a combined cost savings of over $14.8M.

In August 2007, FORTY mounted out to the CENTCOM, EUCOM, and SOUTHCOM theaters. There were complexities of the battalion's deployment, with sites located throughout Kuwait; the Horn of Africa; Andros Island; Guantanamo Bay, Cuba; Rota, Spain, Romania, Sao Tome; and Ghana. Despite the challenges associated with such dispersion of personnel and tasking, the battalion safely completing over 46,000 man-days of construction, camp maintenance service and combat service support on 91 projects.

In January 2009, the battalion deployed to Okinawa with nine detachment sites throughout the Pacific Command (PACOM) Area of Operations. NMCB 40 took custody of the Tables of Allowance at Camp Shields in Okinawa and Camp Covington in Guam manning and maintaining both locations. NMCB 40 participated in eight annual PACOM exercises: Cobra Gold, Freedom Banner, Balikatan, Voluntary Demonstration of Response (VDR), Cooperation Afloat Readiness and Training (CARAT), Foal Eagle/Key Resolve, Talisman Saber, and Ulchi Focus Guardian. The exercises included Humanitarian and Civic Assistance (HCA) projects which continue to further the U.S. strategic goal of Theater Security Cooperation in key regions around the world. In all, NMCB 40 completed a total of 40,143 man-days of readiness training and construction tasking for more than 48 construction projects in 10 countries dispersed throughout the PACOM AOR. NMCB 40 also opened up the newest 26-person detail site in Timor-Leste (formerly known as East Timor) and constructed, repaired and renovated over eight schools for the Timorese Government.

In June 2010, FORTY deployed a reinforced Air Detachment of 125 Seabees from Port Hueneme to Kandahar in Regional Command South, Afghanistan, to support Operation HAMKARI BARAYE (Phase III of Operation Moshtarak). This operation was critical to shape and enable the Government of the Islamic Republic of Afghanistan (GIRoA) to protect the Afghan people and provide a secure environment for sustainable peace. The Main Body deployed to Regional Command North and Regional Command East to Forward Operating Base Deh Dadi II and six enduring detail sites in July 2010, throughout the ISAF Theater of Operations. The construction of Deh Dadi II was the largest Earth moving operation US forces undertook in a combat zone since World War II. The Battalion conducted a relief-in-place (RIP) with Naval Mobile Construction Battalion Four to support the surge of 30,000 additional troops directed by the Commander-in-Chief to bolster the Afghanistan strategy.

=== Decommissioning ===
On 12 September 2012, Naval Mobile Construction Battalion FORTY was decommissioned at the Naval Construction Battalion Center Port Hueneme, California. In addition to its last commanding officer, CDR Timothy DeWitt, in attendance was Commander Naval Facilities Engineering Command (NAVFAC) RADM Christopher J. Mossey, along with many other former Commanding Officers and Command Master Chiefs.

== Unit awards ==
- U.S. Army Distinguished Unit Citation : – 40th CB plus 12 men from the 78th CB with the 1st Cavalry Div. on Los Negros
- 1st Battalion, 502d Infantry Regiment Afghanistan 2010

=== Campaign and service awards ===
- Asiatic–Pacific Campaign Medal with one arrowhead device with 2 bronze star device
- World War II Victory Medal
- Vietnam Campaign Medal service ribbon with 60– Device
- Vietnam Service Medal: – 5 awards
- Armed Forces Expeditionary Medal Somalia 1991–93
- Armed Forces Expeditionary Medal Bosnia 1995–96
- Southwest Asia Service Medal
- Global War on Terrorism Service Medal
- Global War on Terrorism Expeditionary Medal
- Afghanistan Campaign Medal
- Iraq Campaign Medal
- Humanitarian Service Medal : – 10 May - 31 July 1976
- Humanitarian Service Medal : – Hurricane Katrina/Rita Relief Effort
- Navy "E" Ribbon : – U.S. Atlantic Fleet Battle "E" (9 awards).
- Peltier Award: – (3 awards).

== See also ==
- Admiral Ben Moreell
- Amphibious Construction Battalion One (ACB-1)
- Amphibious Construction Battalion Two (ACB-2)
- Civil Engineer Corps United States Navy
- Naval Construction Battalion aka Seabee
- Seabees in World War II
- Naval Amphibious Base Little Creek
- Naval Amphibious Base Coronado
- Naval Construction Battalion Center (Gulfport, Mississippi)
- Naval Construction Battalion Center Port Hueneme
- Naval Mobile Construction Battalion 1
- Naval Mobile Construction Battalion 3
- Naval Mobile Construction Battalion 4
- Naval Mobile Construction Battalion 7
- Naval Mobile Construction Battalion 11
- Naval Mobile Construction Battalion 25
- Naval Mobile Construction Battalion 26
- Naval Mobile Construction Battalion 133
