= Naval Mobile Construction Battalion 26 =

Naval Mobile Construction Battalion TWO SIX
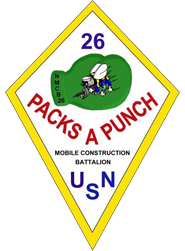
- Active: 8 August 1942 – 30 September 2014
- Country: United States
- Branch: USN
- Part of: 7th Naval Construction Regiment
- Homeport: Selfridge Air National Guard Base
- Engagements: World War II; Operation Enduring Freedom; Operation Iraqi Freedom

Commanders
- Current commander: CDR Rob Steen (last CO)
- Notable commanders: RADM Mark Fung

Naval Mobile Construction Battalion TWO SIX (NMCB 26) was a United States Navy Seabee battalion commissioned in 1942 for support to Naval Operations in the Pacific Theater in World War II and later a Reserve Naval Construction Battalion based in various locations in the Midwest from 1962 until 2014.

== History ==
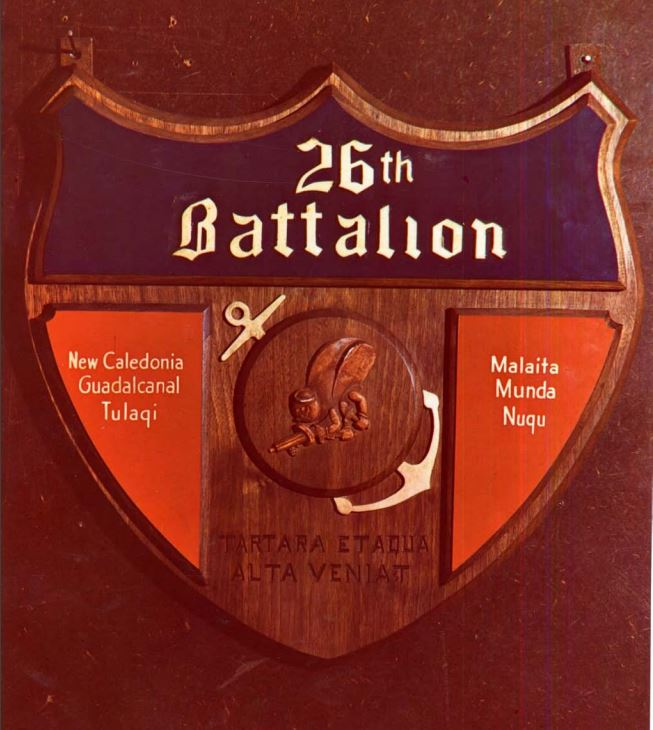
26th Naval Construction Battalion WWII Insignia (Seabee Museum)

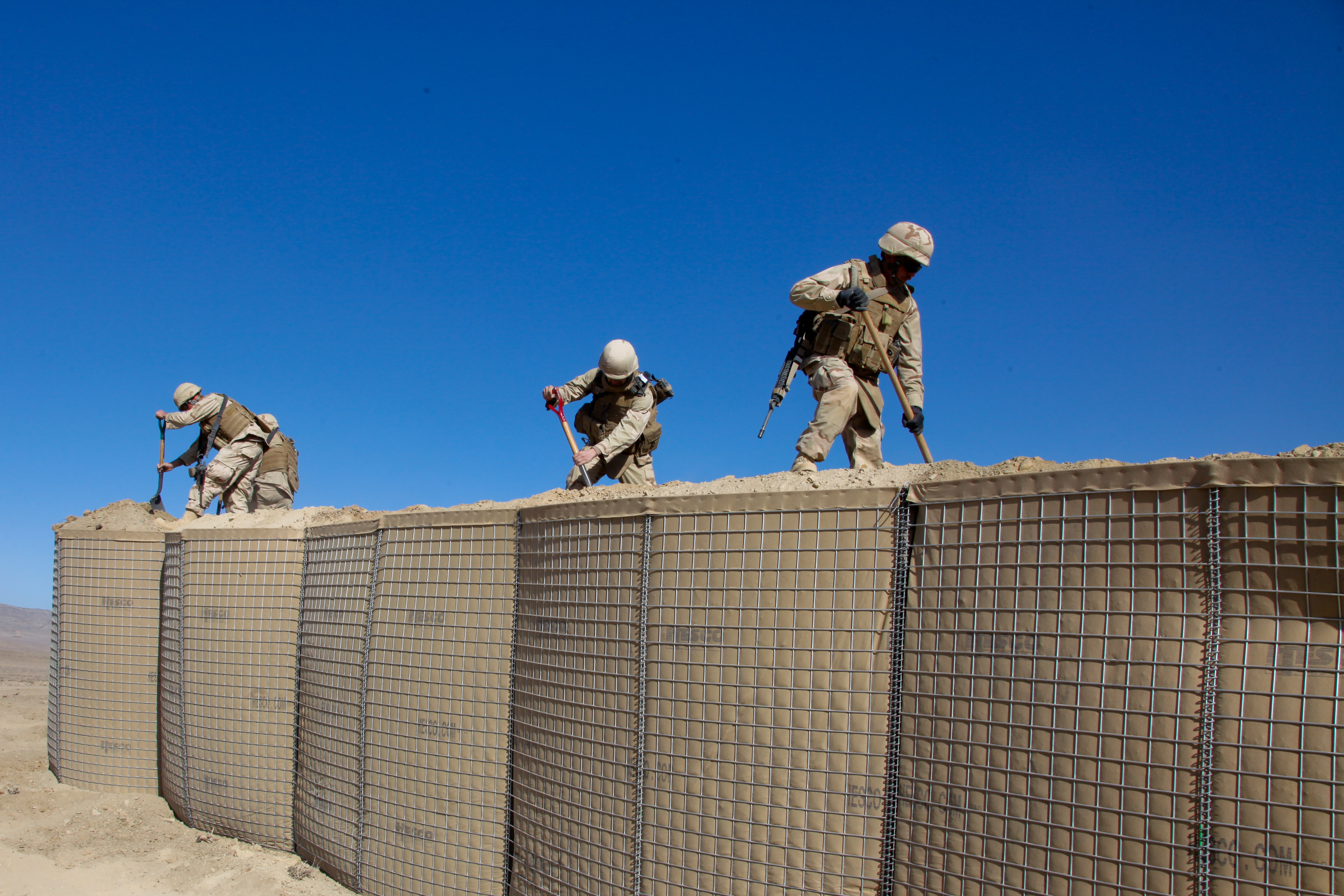
101226-A-7213S-204 (5320467793) Seabees from the 26th Naval Mobile Construction Battalion shovel dirt across HESCO barriers while constructing an Afghan National Police checkpoint in Bora Jengi in the Zabul province, Afghanistan, 26 Dec. 2010. (U.S.Army)

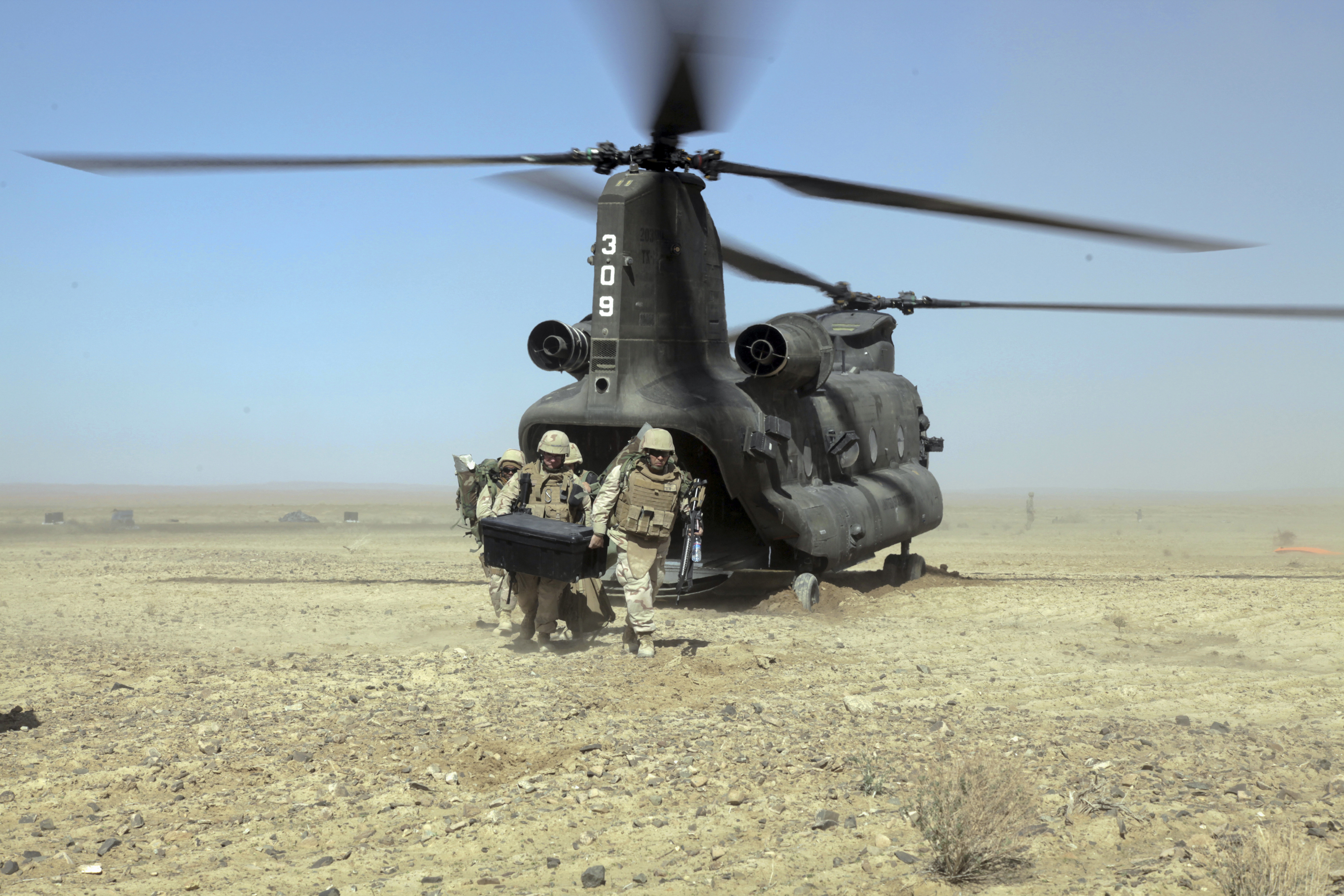
US Navy 110308-A-WA427-079 Seabees assigned to Naval Mobile Construction Battalion (NMCB) 26 disembark a Ch47 Chinook helicopter in the Shorabak district, Kandahar province, Afghanistan after placing an Afghan border police checkpoint. NMCB-26 is part of Task Force Overlord supporting Operation Paksazi Mojadad. (U.S. Army)

=== WWII ===
In August 1942 the future members of Naval Construction Battalion (NCB) 26 arrived at Camp Allen, Virginia. In October they shipped out and on 20 December 1942, the twenty-seven officers and 968 men of NCB 26 arrived in the South Pacific participating in the Guadalcanal Campaign, relieving NCB 6 and moved into their camp at Henderson Field. The commanding officer was LCDR C. A. Frye and executive officer was LT H.H. Allen. Their mission was to complete projects necessary for driving the Japanese from the island of Guadalcanal. The Seabees at Naval Base Guadalcanal built gun mounts and emplacements, tunnels, 6,000 feet of railroad, multiple docks, over 35 miles of primary roadway, 10 bridges and two radio stations with 150-foot transmitter towers. The tradesmen also completed salvage work on ships damaged by enemy attacks. While there the battalion had 187 air alerts and came under attack 68 times.

Shortly after arriving at Guadalcanal, Delta Company was sent to Tulagi, a naval base across the bay. Here they operated four electric generators, installed over 158,000 feet of power line, installed nearly 500,000 feet of telephone and communications wire and twelve miles of overhead wire. They operated the islands water system and fire system, maintained Aviation Gas service areas and completed seventy-three construction projects and repairs PT boats. Maintaining the critical flow of fuel to the war effort, NCB 26 received and dispensed over 34 million gallons of gasoline.

After a particularly harrowing night attack by the Japanese on 4–5 February 1943, Admiral William Halsey, Jr., Commander of the South Pacific Force of the Pacific Fleet commended two Chief Petty Officers of NMCB 26 for meritorious devotion to duty. During the attack a Japanese bomb landed in the center of NCB26's galley that had just been completed, destroying it completely. Chief Carpenters mates James D. Eaton and Howard W. Swan "..left their foxhole while the attack was still in progress to help organize and direct a fire fighting party which extiguished the flames which were illuminating the camp and thereby increasing the probability of a second attack with greater damage to life and property."

After the Japanese were driven from Guadalcanal, many of the Seabees were diverted to the New Georgia Islands, base construction in the Russell Islands, maintaining Petroleum reserves in California with a sizable detachment deployed further north to Kodiak, Alaska. Late in the war the Japanese made a last ditch thrust towards Alaska, threatening critical American Bases at Sitka. The NCB 26 detachment was sent to assist in repelling the Japanese incursion into the Aleutian Islands. This was a sizable effort, with over 20,000 Seabees were working in Alaska in 1944.

NCB 26 finished World War II fulfilling their duties in these locations and quietly dispersed back to civilian life at the close of war. However, their contribution to the war was recognized by multiple commendations for valor and service by two Army XIV Corps commanders Major General A.M. Patch and Major General O.W. Griswold, as well as the legendary Admiral William 'Bull' Halsey. The battalion was decommissioned.

== Recommissioned Naval Reserve ==
It was 1962 when RNMCB 26 was revived and reorganized with CDR M.C. Wakefield as commanding officer. Headquarters was established in Milwaukee, Wisconsin. After four years, RNMCB 26 moved its headquarters to Indianapolis, Indiana, where E.R. Englert assumed command. The battalion reorganized with the Seabees of RNMCB 27 in 1968. The reorganized TWENTY-SIX came under the command of CDR T.H. Torgersen, with headquarters in Chicago. CDR Torgersen ran the Battalion until he was relieved by CDR R.J. Weller on 1 July 1971. On 1 July 1973, CDR R.W. Braun relieved CDR Weller as commanding officer.

In the 1970s major construction projects were undertaken at NAS Glenview, Marine Corps Base, Quantico, Virginia, and at Amphibious Base, Little Creek, Virginia. In 1975, RNMCB 26 was one of only two battalions nationwide to earn an overall REDDU evaluation of "Outstanding". Effective November 1975, CDR J.R. Gallaugher relieved CDR Braun as the commanding officer of RNMCB 26. In July 1976, CDR Thomas A. Winkel relieved CDR Gallaugher as the commanding officer of RNMCB 26. On 1 October 1978, CDR Winkel turned the command of RNMCB 26 over to CDR Walter T. Meisner, Jr.

In October 1980, CDR R.G. Hepburn relieved CAPT Walter T. Meisner, Jr., as commanding officer. On 1 October 1983, command of the Battalion passed from CDR Hepburn to CDR R.D. Shepard. The new Permanent Drill Site at Naval Air Facility, Detroit, Selfridge Air National Guard Base, Mount Clemens, Michigan was officially occupied in September 1985.

For exemplary performance Reserve Naval Mobile Construction Battalion TWENTY-SIX was awarded the Best of Type (Battle 'E') in 1986. On 1 October 1986 CDR Norman D. Raderer relieved CDR Burrus as commanding officer. Battalion strength was approximately 771 personnel.

In the 1980s a wide variety of training occurred providing excellent experience for the battalion. Projects were completed at Bases in Hawaii, Davisville, Rhode Island, Quantico, Virginia, FT Benning, Georgia, FT Jackson SC, and Twenty-nine Palms, CA. The training saw as Seabees, Marines and Soldiers honed their collaborative skills and teamwork. Detachments were also deployed to Rota, Spain in 1989 to complete construction projects there. Detachments also performed projects in Puerto Rico and Guantanamo Bay, Cuba.

The 1990s again saw much change within the NCF and in the Navy. Nonetheless, NMCB 26 completed training evolutions with great names like 'Sea Dragon' 'Green Stinger' and 'Sharp Wedge'. We left our imprint of workmanship in places like Guam, Hawaii, Massachusetts, Alabama, Sigonella and Naples, Italy, Crete, the Seabee Museum in Gulfport, Camp Lejeune NC and Rota, Spain, to name a few. Humanitarian projects involving the digging of water wells for rural inhabitants of Guatemala, Panama and Belize in Central America were completed. In 1990, Commander Thomas R. Reid relieved Commander Larry G. DeVries as RNMCB26 commanding officer and LCDR Norman Schleif relieved LCDR Kenneth Drake as RNMCB 26 XO. FY91 was a year dominated by the Desert Shield and Desert Storm operations. Several NMCB26 members were recalled to active duty with other NMCBs in late 1990. NMCB26 itself was notified in January 1991 of plans to activate it towards the end of the fiscal year, but the early, successful military resolution of the Middle Eastern crisis removed the need for NMCB26's.recall.

At the start of FY 93 CDR Thomas R. Reid handed over command to CDR O. Wayne Ramsey. At the beginning ofFY95, CDR Ramsey handed over command to CDR Gary J. KEIL and at the end of FY96, CDR Keil handed over command ofNMCB-26 to CDR Mark A. Battle. At the end of FY 98, CDR Battle handed over command of NMCB 26 to CDR Terrence R. Huxel. The executive officer was LCDR Terry Mahoney and CMDCM was Gene Toffolo.

The Seabees of TWO SIX had grown accustomed to the constant change of life in the NCF, but the new millennium brought more than anyone anticipated. The Global War on Terror brought multiple deployments and in this decade. NMCB 26 also provided construction project support in Columbus, New Mexico, Naval Weapons Station Charleston, Nogales, Arizona, Croatia and Germany.

NMCB 26 entered the 21st Century with Commanding Officer CDR Terry Huxel, XO CDR Doug Dariano and CMDCM was Gene Toffolo. In FY 2001, CDR Dariano became the CO, with LCDR Terry Hart serving as XO and EQCM Dan Miller as Command Master Chief.

=== The War on Terror ===
Naval Mobile Construction Battalion 26 was activated out of the Naval Reserve in early 2003. Two (2) heavy air detachments of reserve Seabees and a main body were formed from its detachments and recalled to deploy to the European Area of Responsibility (AOR). CDR Daniel Stehly, CEC was the commanding officer of NMCB 26 with CMDCM Richard Abernathy. The unit was deployed in Rota, Spain; Souda Bay, Crete; and Sigonella, Italy. In October 2003, LCDR Spalding returned to NMCB 26 as the executive officer (XO).

Im 2005 the battalion was turned over to CDR Joe Leahy, who continued readiness training and sending detachments on construction efforts around the world in Croatia and Germany.

In 2006 through 2007, under CDR Mark Fung, now Rear Admiral Fung, two air detachments were deployed to the CENTCOM AOR with back to back deployments, let by LT Scott Kelley (Air Det One) and LT Patrick Kuhne (Air Det Two). NMCB 26 Seabees completed construction projects in Kuwait, Afghanistan, Bahrain, and the Gulf Oil Platforms. As a result of the Battalion's efforts in theater and in homeport, the battalion earned the Battle "E" in back to back years of 2006 and 2007. NMCB 26 closed out the decade with continuing their training and readiness and completing projects within the US at Columbus, New Mexico, Naval Weapons Station Charleston, and Nogales, Arizona.

In 2008 the Command fell under the control of CDR Phil Spalding who continued the FRTP cycle ensuring all Seabees were ready for any mission assigned. Projects were completed stateside as well as individuals deploying with several units to the CENTCOM AOR.

In 2010 the battalion was called again and deployed to CENTCOM again under the command of CDR Regina Gallagher Marengo. Seabees constructed force protection at forward bases, drilled wells and performed contingency construction throughout the NATO ISAF AOR, including Iraq, Kuwait, Bahrain and Southern Afghanistan. For their efforts on this deployment NMCB 26 was awarded the 2011 Best of Type Battle E, the 'Rear Admiral John R. Perry Award' as the finest Reserve Battalion in the nation, the Army Presidential Unit Citation, Army Valorous Unit Award, and a Meritorious Unit Citation.

Upon returning to the reserve world, the Command was turned over to the final commanding officer of NMCB 26, in 2012 to Commander Rob Steen. The battalion XO was LCDR Patrick Kuhne and the CMDCM was Ed Schoen and later CMDCM Daryl Johnson, for the final year. The battalion remained very active, focused on the changes within the NCF and developing each Seabee for their next steps. But in 2013, with changes occurring in Afghanistan, NMCB 26 was once again called upon to deploy. NMCB 26 sent a heavy air detachment to Afghanistan led by LCDR Deniz Piskin, augmenting NMCB 28 contributing to the largest Seabee battalion in a war zone since the Vietnam War. Due to outstanding performance in 2014, NMCB 26 was awarded the Best of Type "Battle E" for the Atlantic Fleet.

=== Decommissioning ===
On 30 September 2014, following a ceremony held on 20 September, NMCB 26 was officially decommissioned at Selfridge Air National Guard Base, Michigan.

== Unit Awards ==
- U.S. Army Presidential Unit Citation, Iraq/Afghanistan
- U.S. Army Valorous Unit Award, Iraq/Afghanistan
- U.S.Army Meritorious Unit Commendation, Iraq/Afghanistan
- Navy "E" Ribbon : – U.S. Atlantic Fleet Battle "E" 10 awards
- Perry Award: – 3 awards.

Campaign and Service ribbons

- Asiatic–Pacific Campaign Medal
- Southwest Asia Service Medal
- Global War on Terrorism Expeditionary Medal
- Afghanistan Campaign Medal
- Iraq Campaign Medal

== See also ==
- Admiral Ben Moreell
- Amphibious Construction Battalion One (ACB-1)
- Amphibious Construction Battalion Two (ACB-2)
- Civil Engineer Corps United States Navy
- Naval Construction Battalion aka Seabee
- Seabees in World War II
- Naval Amphibious Base Little Creek
- Naval Amphibious Base Coronado
- Naval Construction Battalion Center (Gulfport, Mississippi)
- Naval Construction Battalion Center Port Hueneme
- Naval Mobile Construction Battalion 1
- Naval Mobile Construction Battalion 3
- Naval Mobile Construction Battalion 4
- Naval Mobile Construction Battalion 7
- Naval Mobile Construction Battalion 11
- Naval Mobile Construction Battalion 25
- Naval Mobile Construction Battalion 40
- Naval Mobile Construction Battalion 133
