= Naval Construction Battalion Center Port Hueneme =

US Navy installation near Oxnard, California, US

Coordinates: 34.16814°N 119.20016°W

CBC Port Hueneme
- Port Hueneme, California
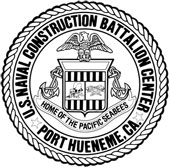
- CBC Port Hueneme Insignia

Site information
- Type: Military base
- Controlled by: United States Navy

Site history
- In use: May 18, 1942 - 2000 (merged into Naval Base Ventura County)

Garrison information
- Past commanders: Oliver Kessing

Naval Construction Battalion Center Port Hueneme, operated as an independent base from 1942 to 2000 as the West Coast home port of the Navy’s Construction Battalions. In 2000, the CBC merged with nearby Naval Air Station Point Mugu to form Naval Base Ventura County.

== History ==
"1942: The start of the Second World War sent naval survey teams up and down the Pacific coast looking for new locations for naval facilities. One team was looking for a site to build a naval base to support naval construction activities at advanced bases in the Pacific. The team came to Port Hueneme, California and recognized it as an ideal port, because it was the only Pacific deep water port between Los Angeles and San Francisco. Word of the discovery was sent to Admiral Ben Moreell, Chief of the Bureau of Yards and Docks, who was busily putting together the new construction battalions. Port Hueneme therefore was tentatively selected as the site for the advanced base depot on the Pacific coast. On February 16, 1942, Admiral Moreell sent his recommendations to the Chief of Naval Operations and it was speedily approved." The facility at Port Hueneme was built as a temporary depot to train, stage, and supply the newly created Seabees. The base was officially established and began operating May 18, 1942 as an Advance Base Depot (ABD). In 1945 the Advance Base Depot was renamed as a Naval Construction Battalion Center.

During the Korean War, almost all Navy construction equipment and supplies for the war were routed through CBC Port Hueneme.

== U.S. Navy Seabee Museum ==
Located on Naval Base Ventura County is the U.S. Navy Seabee Museum, one of fifteen official U.S. Navy museums. The museum is the principal repository for the Seabees’ operational history. The Seabee Archive contains various operational records, battalion histories, manuscripts, oral histories, biographies, and personal papers pertaining to the Seabees.

== See also ==
- Admiral Ben Moreell
- Amphibious Construction Battalion One (ACB-1)
- Amphibious Construction Battalion TWO (ACB-2)
- Civil Engineer Corps United States Navy
- Naval Construction Battalion aka Seabee
- Seabees in World War II
- Naval Amphibious Base Little Creek § Major shore commands (at "Naval Construction Force")
- Naval Amphibious Base Coronado
- Naval Construction Battalion Center (Gulfport, Mississippi)
- Naval Mobile Construction Battalion 3
- Naval Mobile Construction Battalion 4
- Naval Mobile Construction Battalion 7
- Naval Mobile Construction Battalion 11
- Naval Mobile Construction Battalion 25
- Naval Mobile Construction Battalion 26
- Naval Mobile Construction Battalion 40
- Naval Mobile Construction Battalion 133
