= Naval Mobile Construction Battalion 4 =

United States Navy battalion

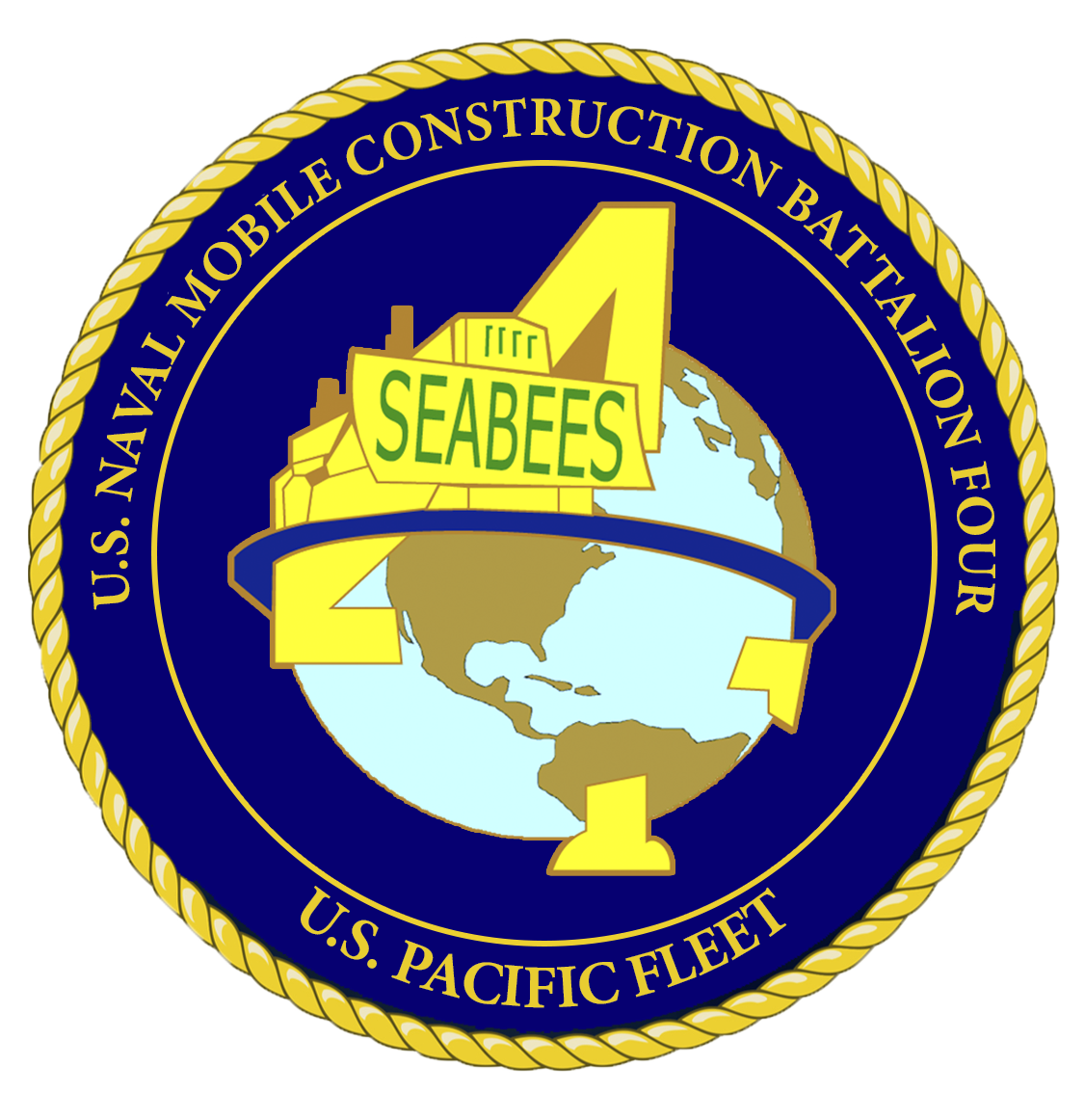
- NMCB 4 Insignia
- Active: 11 May 1942 – present
- Country: United States
- Branch: USN
- Type: Engineering
- Size: 600
- Part of: Naval Construction Group ONE and 30th Naval Construction Regiment
- Homeport: CBC Port Hueneme
- Nickname: "Fabulous Four"
- Mottos: "We Build, We Fight" "CAN DO"
- Mascot: SEABEE – From CB or Construction Battalion
- Engagements: World War II*Aleutian Islands campaign, * Battle of Guam (1944); Vietnam War; Operation Enduring Freedom; Operation Iraqi Freedom

Commanders
- Current commander: CDR John D. Frank, CEC
- Notable commanders: RADM John Korka; RADM Dean VanderLey

Naval Mobile Construction Battalion 4 (NMCB 4) is a Navy Seabee battalion homeported at Port Hueneme, California. Nicknamed the "Pioneers", it is the first of the many CBs created after the original three. The battalion's current insignia first appeared on its 1953–55 cruisebook.

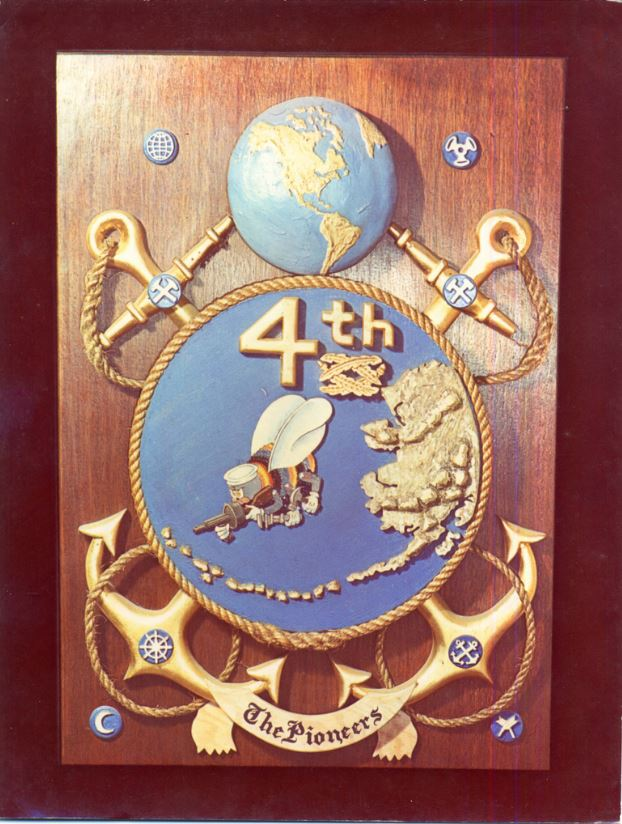
4th NCB WWII insignia

== History ==
=== WWII ===
On 11 June 1942, Naval Construction Battalion 4 was commissioned at NCTC Camp Allen, Norfolk, VA with 32 officers and 1,073 enlisted men. The following month the unit received its military training at Camp Bradford before boarding a train for Port Hueneme, CA. In July, the battalion was sent to Bremerton, Washington for transport to Dutch Harbor, Alaska. Four was the first Construction Battalion in the sector but, was soon joined by CBs 8, 13, 21, and 22. The civilian contractor had been awarded 28 defense contracts of which eight had been completed before the Seabees arrived and took over. Upon arrival, NCB 4 broke into three detachments assigned to: Eider Point, Unalaska, and Fort Mears. Later CB 4 sent dets to Amchitka where it manned a dry-dock and to Adak. A salvage diving detail was sent to Unimak Island. The assignment on Unimak was the grounded Russian steamer SS Turksib (Турксиб was an acronym for Turkestan-Siberian Railway). Together with men from CB 8, and the ship's crew, they assisted the USS Rescuer (ARS-18) and the USS Oriole (AT-136) retrieve the ship's cargo of dynamite. With poor thermal protection the 42 °F water limited diving time. At Amchitka the men came under a Japanese aerial attack. In June 1943 CB 4 returned to CONUS. That November the battalion embarked for the Seabee camp at Moanalua, Hawaii. From there the unit was staged to Guadalcanal for the assault on Guam. In October 1944 an advance echelon of twenty-six men landed D+6 at Orote, Guam. The balance of the battalion soon followed. Of the projects there, the men felt the most important was Naval Hospital No. 18 built adjacent to their camp. To provide water for both the camp and the Hospital a stream was dammed creating a 7.25 million gallon reservoir. After the island was declared secure, the men still had four armed encounters with Japanese. In 1945, CB 4 was moved by seven LSTs to Okinawa. The projects there included roads, camps of quonsets and a large fleet repair facility at Baten-Ko on Buckner Bay. After VJ-day CB 4 was decommissioned as part of the national draw-down of the armed forces.

=== Korea ===
On 12 February 1951, an order was given to reactivate U.S. Naval Mobile Construction Battalion 4. MCB Four was recommissioned on 9 March 1951 at Norfolk, Virginia, with eight officers and 282 enlisted men with homeport, Davisville, R.I. Twelve days later, the unit arrived in Bermuda. There the battalion was brought up to battalion strength and deployed. Project sites included:Port Lyautey, Morocco; Naples, Italy; Gitmo, Cuba; Trinidad; Ecuador; Newfoundland, Canada, Puerto Rico; Holy Loch, Scotland and Rota, Spain.

Sometime between 1953 and 1955, the battalion created the insignia in use today. When the battalion was reactivated in 1951 a bulldozer with the number 4 stenciled on the radiator was the emblem used.

In 1962, MCB 4 was sent to Gitmo for the Cuban Missile Crisis. There the battalion joined MCB 7, already on site, and worked with the Marine security force to fortify the base perimeter and assist with the base defense preparations.

=== Vietnam ===
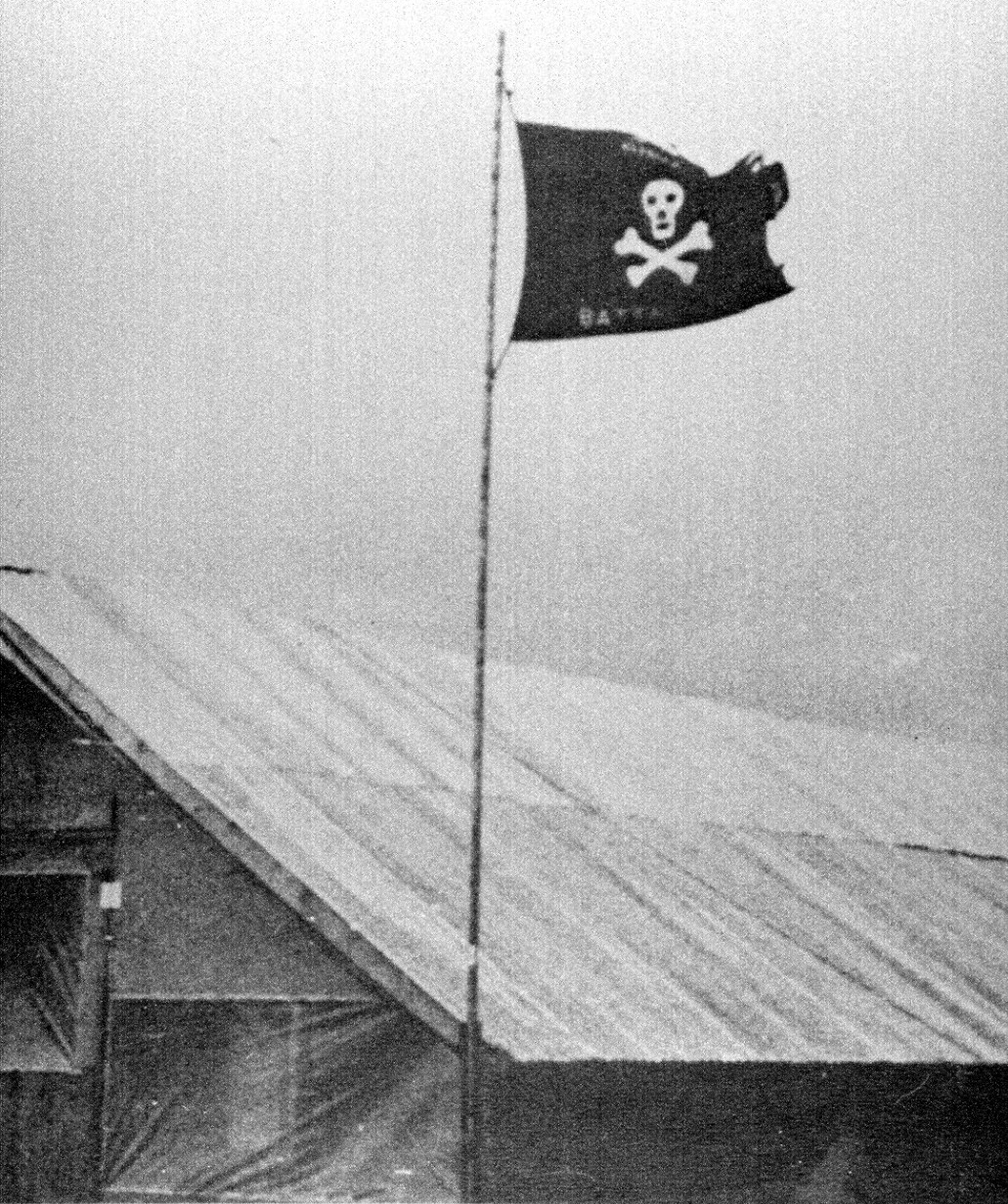
Ghost Battalion colors at Quang Tri. The Seabees had 11,000 graves to move in order to construct that airfield.

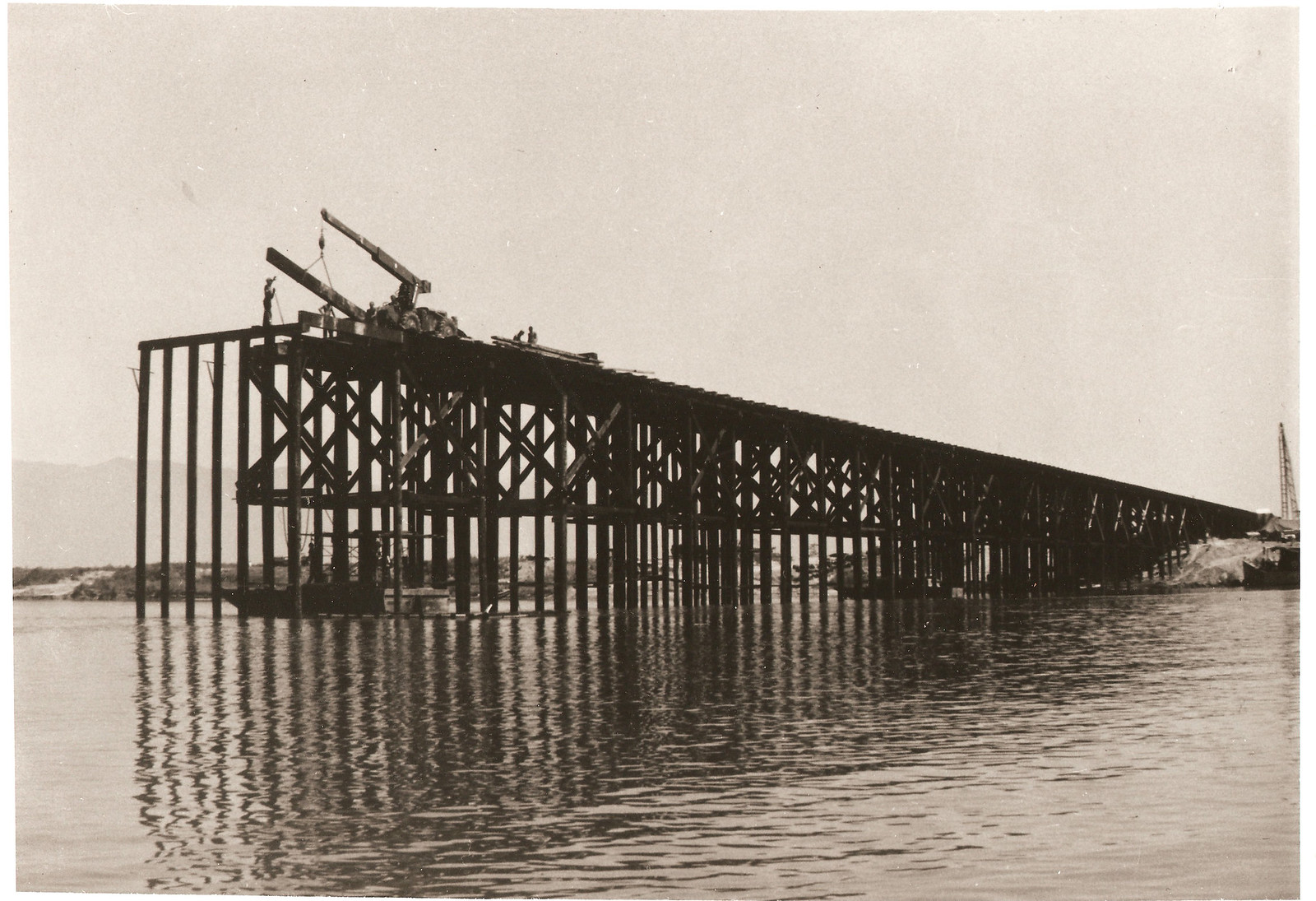
The 2,040' "Liberty" bridge built by CB 4 over the Song Thu Bon river in 1967. It was built to get tanks into Arizona Territory and was attacked and burned multiple times.

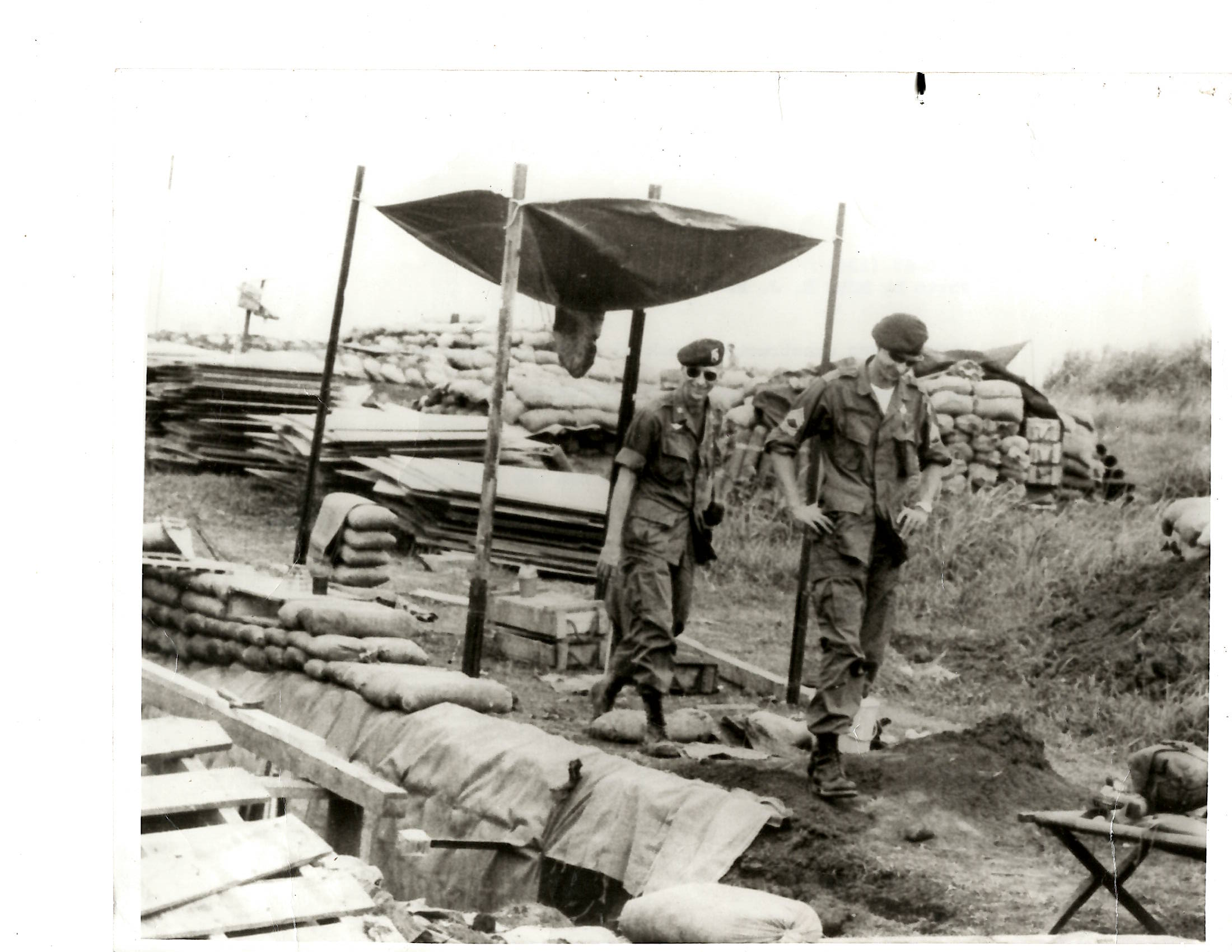
Special Forces Command inspects MCB 4 construction at the Con Thien Special Forces camp. Photo released by Seabee PAO Office Washington DC

MCB 4 conducted four tours during the Vietnam War. In December 1965, the battalion flew to Chu Lai, Vietnam. This was to be the first of many important operations performed in Vietnam. At Chu Lai, Four repaired monsoon-ravaged airfields, installed runway lighting systems for night operations and built a helicopter landing pad. A detachment was also sent to the Kham Duc Airfield near the Laotian border. In August 1966 the battalion returned to its new homeport in Port Hueneme for leave and retraining.

The second Vietnam deployment was to Da Nang in March 1967. The battalion worked at the Da Nang Air Base and Con Thien. MCB 4 sent a small detachment to Hill 158 at Con Thien to build a base for Special Forces det A-110. The detail's actions on 8 May 1967 received a letter of Appreciation from Captain Craig Chamberlain, commander of det A-110. The letter had five endorsements. and states that two of the Seabees contributed significantly to the repulse of the overwhelming Vietcong force. UT1 Lloyd O’Banion was one and received the Silver Star the others received Navy Commendation Medals with "V"s for valor. MCB 4's det OIC and 11 men were wounded in the attack. The battalion's well-drilling team was sent to the camp soon afterwards. During that deployment, an urgent airfield was needed at Quảng Trị. The project was designated "top secret", site "X", and had to be completed in under 45 days. MCBs 1, 3, 4, 7, 10, 11, 74, 121, and 133 all sent detachments of men and equipment to get the job done. Those detachments dubbed themselves the "Ghost Battalion" and chose the Jolly Roger for the battalion's colors. Another project the battalion had was the Liberty bridge over the Song Thu Bon. It had a span of 2,040 feet. It was built to get the Marine tankers across and rated for 60 tons. The bridge was part of the MSR to An Hoa Combat Base and became a target of the Viet Cong multiple times. The An Hoa side of the bridge was the free fire zone known as the Arizona Territory. The battalion also had a small detachment of five Construction electricians (CEs) whose assignment was to rewire a number of Special Forces camps in I Corps. MCB 4 returned to Port Hueneme in October. Four months later in February 1968, the battalion returned to Vietnam. It was during this deployment that the Navy changed Construction Battalion's designations from MCBs to the NMCBs of today.

During its third deployment, the battalion was tasked with essential construction projects along the coast and on Highway 1. At Quang Tri and Camp Evans, the battalion built facilities for Commander, Naval Forces Vietnam. when that was done approximately half the battalion redeployed to the Da Nang area while the other half went to the region of Phu Bai. Projects at Phu Bai included constructing aircraft revetments, laying 85,000 square feet (7,900 m^{2}) of Marsden matting for the airstrip and the installation of 18 miles (29 km) of an eight-inch (203 mm) fuel line from Wunder Beach to Quang Tri combat base.

In the north, the other detachment at Camp Haines built the Army's Camp Evans. The battalion erected nearly 1,000 wooden buildings, resurfaced and matted a 2,900-foot (880 m) aircraft runway, and constructed 23 miles (37 km) of eight-inch (203 mm) oil supply line. In October, NMCB Four returned to the United States after having one of the busiest deployments of any battalion in Vietnam. It then conducted a fourth tour in Vietnam from April 1969 to December 1969.

=== Seabee Teams ===
- 0406 Bao Trai 1967
- 0407 Tan Son Nhut & Can Tho Base Camp 1967
- MMT Con Thien Special Forces Camp 1967 (well drilling team)
- 0408 Go Dau Ha 1968
- 0409 Vinh Long 1968
- 0410 Tan An 1969
- 0414 Cao Lanh 1970
- 0417 Xuân Lộc Base Camp 1971
  - Commander Naval Construction Battalion U.S. Pacific Fleet, Tân Sơn Nhất, Republic of Vietnam, Completion Report 1963–1972. Seabee Teams

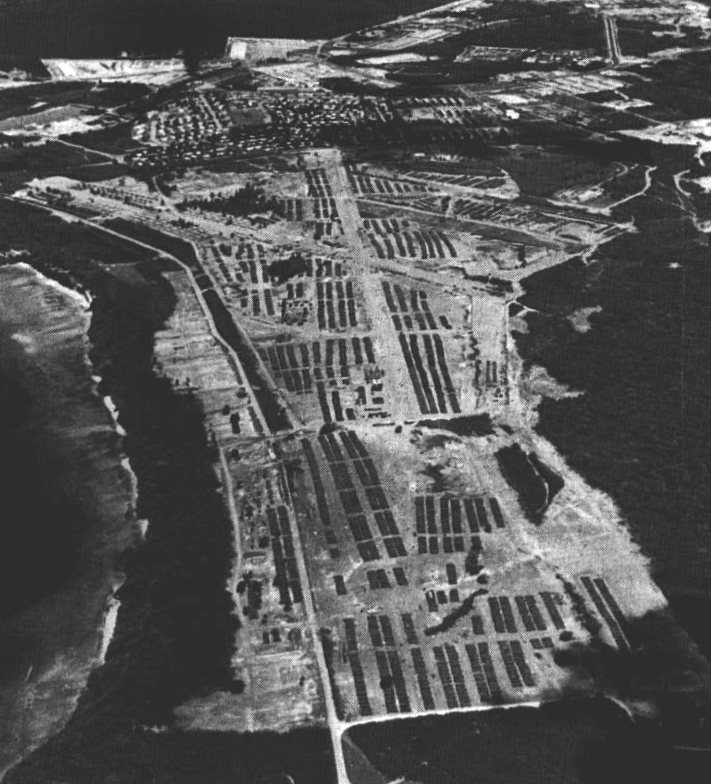
Aerial view of the refugee camp built by NMCB 4 at Orote Point, Guam in 1975

In the 1970s, NMCB Four deployed to construction sites on Diego Garcia, Guam, Hawaii, and Japan. On 23 April 1975, President Ford announced that Vietnam was over for U.S. involvement. On that date NMCB 4 started construction of a temporary camp for Operation New Life refugees on Guam. It was at the WWII location of the Japanese airfield on the Orote peninsula. The battalion was ordered to erect 2000 squad tents in seven days each measured 16 ×

32 feet. The entire battalion, including H Co., worked construction shifts around the clock. When they were done NMCB 4 had built 1,546 tents additional tents. The men also set up Vietnam-style steel drum toilets, which were immediately overwhelmed. The Seabee project list:

- 450 acres of jungle cleared
- electrical system installed
- 25 Southeast Asia huts erected
- 3,546 strong back squad tents erected
- additional berthing – 3,381
- nine galleys erected
- two hospital facilities erected
- 400 restrooms installed
- thousands of feet of water lines installed
- 148 new showers installed
- over 17,000 feet of fencing erected

The battalion was called into action again after Typhoon Tip destroyed the U.S. Marine Barracks at Camp Fuji in 1979. The Seabees rebuilt the barracks and operated a Military Affiliate Radio Station until normal lines of communication were restored.

=== Post Vietnam ===
The 1980s brought the battalion to new regions around the world including Bahrain, Greece, Crete, Palau, Yap (U.S. Trust Territories), Egypt, Kusco, Panama, Costa Rica, Africa, Korea, and Sicily. In 1984, the battalion's air detachment participated in Operation Team Spirit, providing contingency construction support to the 3rd Marine Expeditionary Force (III MEF) at Camp Pohang, Republic of Korea.

NMCB Four redeployed from Camp Moscrip, Naval Station Roosevelt Roads, Puerto Rico to Camp Rohrbach, Saudi Arabia during Operation Desert Shield in August 1990. While redeployed, the battalion set up a 2,000-man tent camp, built a 3,600-foot (1,100 m) taxiway, 20 hides (parking stalls) and other projects in support of U.S. and Allied Forces in the Middle East. On 15 June 1991, responding to the eruption of Mount Pinatubo, NMCB Four mobilized from its deployment site at Camp Shields, Okinawa, to the Republic of the Philippines. The battalion worked around the clock the help the Subic Bay Naval Complex recover by clearing roadways and collapsed buildings, restoring utilities and building shelters in the area devastated by 12 inches (300 mm) of volcanic ash.

In the wake of Hurricane Andrew on 24 August 1992, the battalion mounted out a 150-man Air Detachment and conducted the largest Seabee airlift ever as part of the disaster relief efforts in the communities of Homestead and Florida City, Florida. NMCB Four, along with nine other Seabee units, reopened a local school, cleared debris, restored utility services and provided valuable assistance to private residences, government facilities and volunteer organizations.

In December 1994, NMCB Four deployed to Guantanamo Bay, Cuba, in support of Operation Sea Signal to construct facilities for 20,000 Cuban migrants. The 35 million dollar quality of life improvement program consisted of two cities on 125 and 150-acre (0.61 km^{2}) sites. Work included constructing 1,341 strong back tents, building 67 concrete block buildings, installing over 17 miles (27 km) of underground piping and 53 miles (85 km) of electrical cable and placing 11,700 cubic yards (8,900 m^{3}) of concrete.

=== Iraq ===
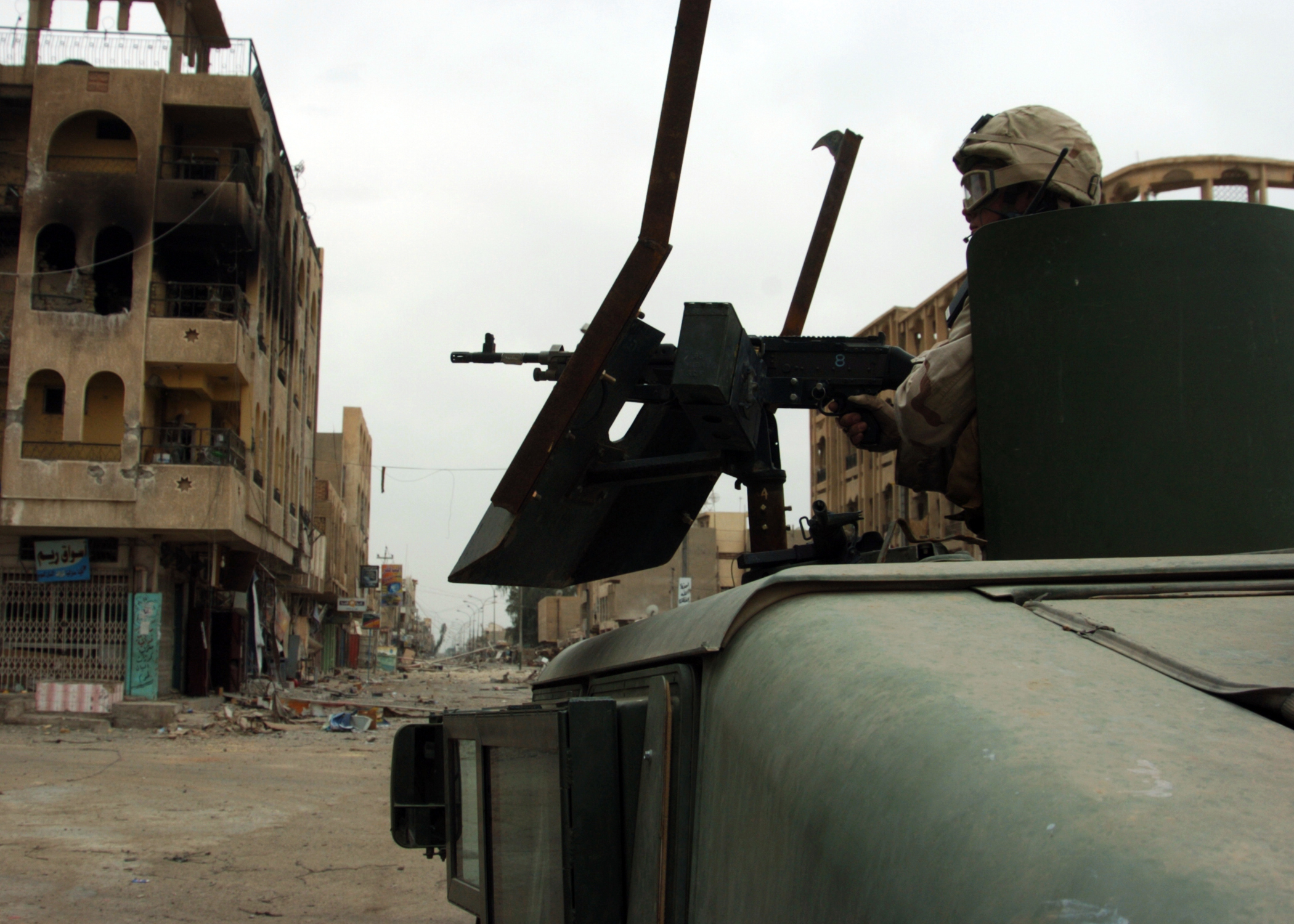
US Navy 041117-N-4388F-001 CM3 Aaron Wolken of NMCB 4 mans an M-240B machine gun as security for his mates clearing debris in Fallujah in support of Operation Al Fajr (New Dawn).

In 2002, NMCB Four sent its Air Detachment and Water Well Team to Basilian Island, Philippines, in support of Operation Enduring Freedom - Philippines. The Air Detachment repaired roads, constructed C huts, bridges and helicopter landing zones and installed water wells to support U.S. Forces.

During the 2003 deployment, NMCB Four deployed to Iraq in support of Operation Iraqi Freedom I to help sustain combat during combat operations, during this time NMCB 4 built and maintained roads, schools, police stations, prisons, and fire stations. NMCB 4 also constructed 6 Mabey Johnson bridges, pulled security and drove convoy missions from Kuwait to the northernmost cities of Iraq.

- NMCB 4's SERT was awarded the Combat Action Ribbon for its relieving NMCB 5s team at the airfield outside Qalat Sukkar in March 2003. They were the first Seabees to be engaged in combat since Vietnam.

In 2012, NMCB Four made history in Afghanistan at the Air Field. There eight women were tasked as the first all-female Seabee detail to build two 20 by 32-foot B-huts. It was done in support of the village stability platform in Malozai, Helmand province. Women first joined the Seabees in 1972 and by 1994 were deploying alongside men.

== Unit awards ==
- Navy Unit Commendation – Vietnam
- Navy Unit Commendation – Vietnam
- Navy Unit Commendation – Vietnam
- Joint Meritorious Unit Award –
- Republic of Vietnam Civil Actions Medal Unit Citation
- Republic of Vietnam Gallantry Cross with Palm Unit Award
- Presidential Unit Citation (Philippines); – 2002 Exercise Balikatan 02-1
- Presidential Unit Citation – Iraq 2003
- Army Meritorious Unit Commendation – Iraq 2008–09
- Army Meritorious Unit Commendation – Iraq 2010
- Navy "E" Ribbon – U.S. Atlantic Fleet Battle "E" 12 times.
- Peltier Award – 6 times
- Letter of Appreciation: Commander Special Forces det A-110 – May 1967 plus 5 endorsements: Commander C Co 5th Special Forces Group (Air Borne), Commanding General, III Marine Amphibious·Force, Commander, U.S. Naval Forces, Vietnam, Commander, Third Naval Construction Brigade, Commander THIRTIETH Naval Construction Regiment

Service and campaign awards

- Asiatic-Pacific Campaign Medal with two bronze stars device – Aleutians, Guam, Okinawa
- World War II Victory Medal
- Vietnam Campaign Medal service ribbon with 60– Device – 4 awards
- Vietnam Service Medal
- Combat Action Ribbon 2003 (SERT-4)
- Humanitarian Service Medal USA Hurricane Katrina 2005
- Global War on Terrorism Service Medal
- Afghanistan Campaign Medal
- Southwest Asia Service Medal

Chief of Naval Operations Awards page Vietnam

== See also ==
- Admiral Ben Moreell
- Amphibious Construction Battalion 1 (ACB-1)
- Amphibious Construction Battalion 2 (ACB-2)
- Civil Engineer Corps United States Navy
- Naval Construction Battalion
- Naval Amphibious Base Little Creek
- Naval Amphibious Base Coronado
- Naval Construction Battalion Center (Gulfport, Mississippi)
- Naval Construction Battalion Center Port Hueneme
- Naval Mobile Construction Battalion 1
- Naval Mobile Construction Battalion 3
- Naval Mobile Construction Battalion 5
- Naval Mobile Construction Battalion 11
- Naval Mobile Construction Battalion 133
- Seabees in World War II
- Seabee
- Underwater Construction Teams
