= Naval Construction Battalion Center (Gulfport, Mississippi) =

U.S. Navy industrial complex in Gulfport, Mississippi

Naval Construction Battalion Center Gulfport
- Gulfport, Mississippi in the United States
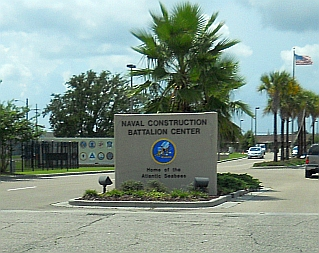
- Entrance sign at Naval Construction Battalion Center Gulfport

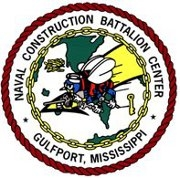

Site information
- Type: Naval construction support base
- Owner: Department of Defense
- Operator: US Navy
- Controlled by: Navy Region Southeast
- Condition: Operational
- Website: Official website

Location
- Location within Mississippi Location within the United States
- Coordinates: 30°22′38″N 089°07′26″W

Site history
- Built: 1942
- In use: 1942 – present
- Events: Hurricane Camille (1969); Hurricane Katrina (2005)

Garrison information
- Current commander: Captain Tate Metlen

Naval Construction Battalion Center is a 1,100-acre (450 ha) U.S. Navy industrial complex located in Gulfport, Mississippi. It serves as home base for the Atlantic Fleet Seabees, which are the Navy's construction battalions.

== Mission ==
The mission of the Naval Construction Battalion Center (CBC) Gulfport is:

To maintain and operate facilities and provide services and material in support of Naval Construction Force Units, to include Amphibious Construction Fleet Units, the Maritime Prepositioning Force (Enhanced), and other fleet and assigned organizational units deployed from or homeported at CBC Gulfport, and to perform such other functions and tasks as may be assigned by higher authority.

== History ==
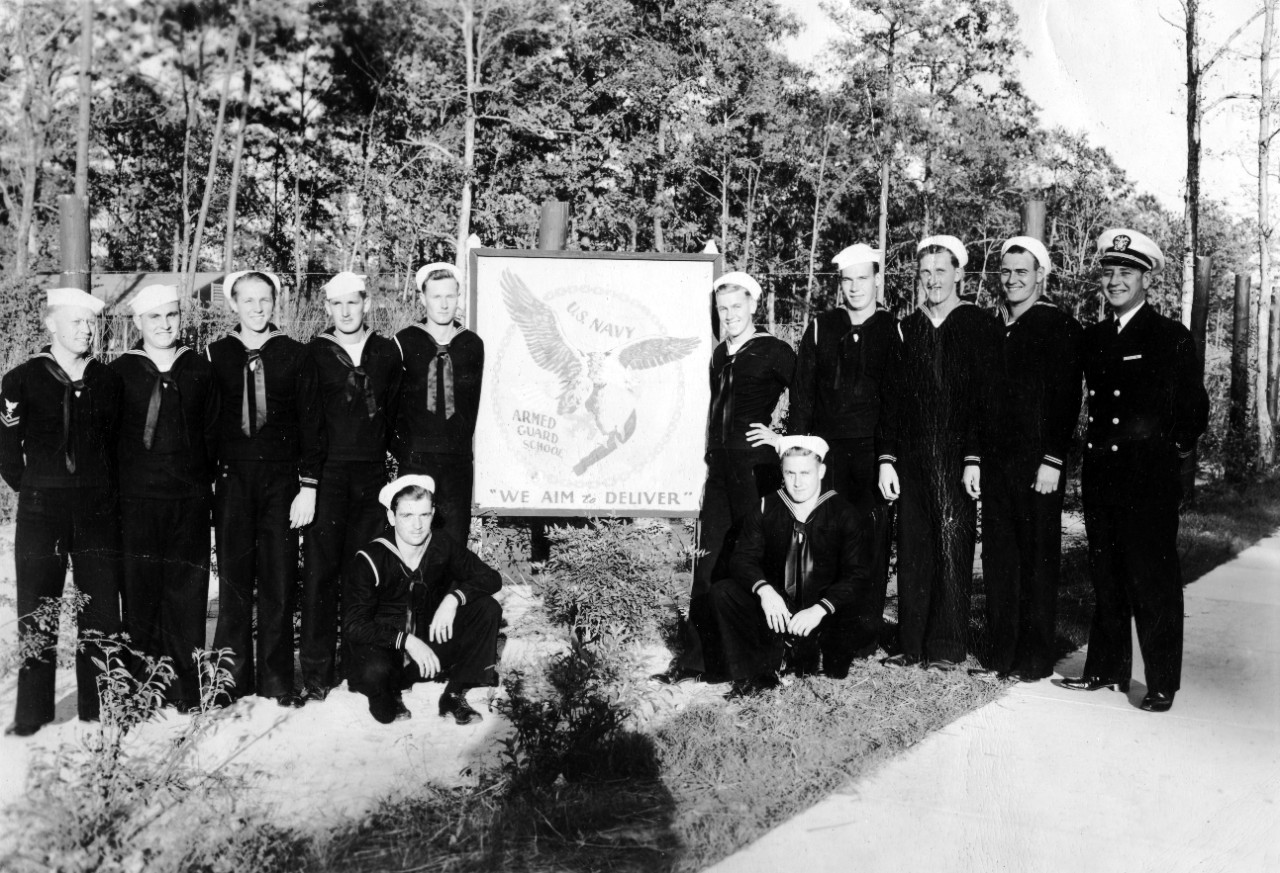
Navy Armed Guard Training Center

On June 2, 1942, an Advanced Base Depot was established in Gulfport and the first Seabees arrived. Defense planning during the early years of World War II called for a deep-water port to serve the Caribbean region. Gulfport had the necessary port facility, as well as a semi-tropical climate for year-round training and shipping. A school was set up for Battalions passing through to be trained for the Malaria and Epidemic Control Group of BUMED.

Also assigned to Gulfport was one of the Navy's three Naval Armed Guards Training Centers. HQ for the Navy's Armed Guards was in New Orleans. The Armed Guards manned the deck guns of Merchant vessels under contract to the Navy.

On March 21, 1944, Camp Hollyday was disestablished and the base changed to a Naval Training Center for ratings in basic engineering, diesel engine, radio, quartermaster, and electrician. The electrician school was 17 weeks. In 1946 the Training Center was decommissioned. On 23 October 1945 Bureau of Yards and Docks (BuDocks) transferred the base to the Bureau of Supplies and Accounts. The complex was re-designated a Naval Storehouse facility for stockpiling bauxite, tin, copper, sisal and abacá. In 1952, the Naval Storehouse was disestablished with the base transferred back to BuDocks. It was then designated as a U.S. Naval Construction Battalion Center.

In the mid-1960s, there was an increasing need for naval construction forces in Southeast Asia. To meet that need, the Naval Construction Battalion Center expanded in both military and civilian personnel and continued to serve as a training facility through the latter half of the 20th century.

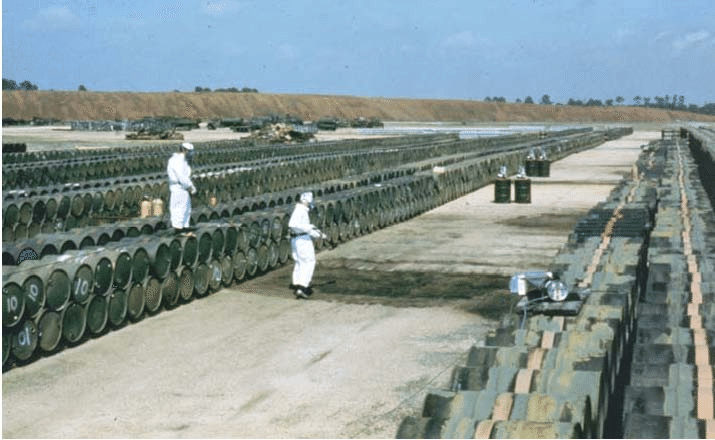
Inspection of the Agent Orange Inventory at NCBC in Gulfport, 1975. (USAF)

During the Vietnam War, NCBC Gulfport was the largest storage site in the United States for Agent Orange prior to shipment to Southeast Asia. In 1968, the base received 68,700 55-gallon barrels of herbicide for shipment to Vietnam. Long-term storage of barrels began in 1969 and lasted until 1977. The storage site was 30 acres (12 ha) in size and was still being cleaned up in 2013.

== Hurricanes Camille and Katrina ==

In 1969, before, during, and after the landfall of Hurricane Camille, 1700 Seabees from NCBC Gulfport helped the surrounding communities prepare for and recover from the hurricane. NCBC served as a recovery center providing a staging site for over 500 Georgia Power repairmen and highway crews. Damage to the base was extensive with 25 structures completely destroyed. The Governor of Mississippi tasked the NCBC with the recovery of the area from Gulfport to west of Bay St. Louis. That area was ground zero for Camille's landfall. Pass Christian was assigned to the 121st CB with the battalion setting up camp there, working round the clock in two 12-hour shifts. The military and civilian personnel received numerous medals and commendations from the Navy and local officials. When it was over the NCBC and CBs 74 and 121 all received Navy Unit Commendations. Mississippi Governor John Bell Williams declared October 31, 1969 as "Seabees Awards Day".

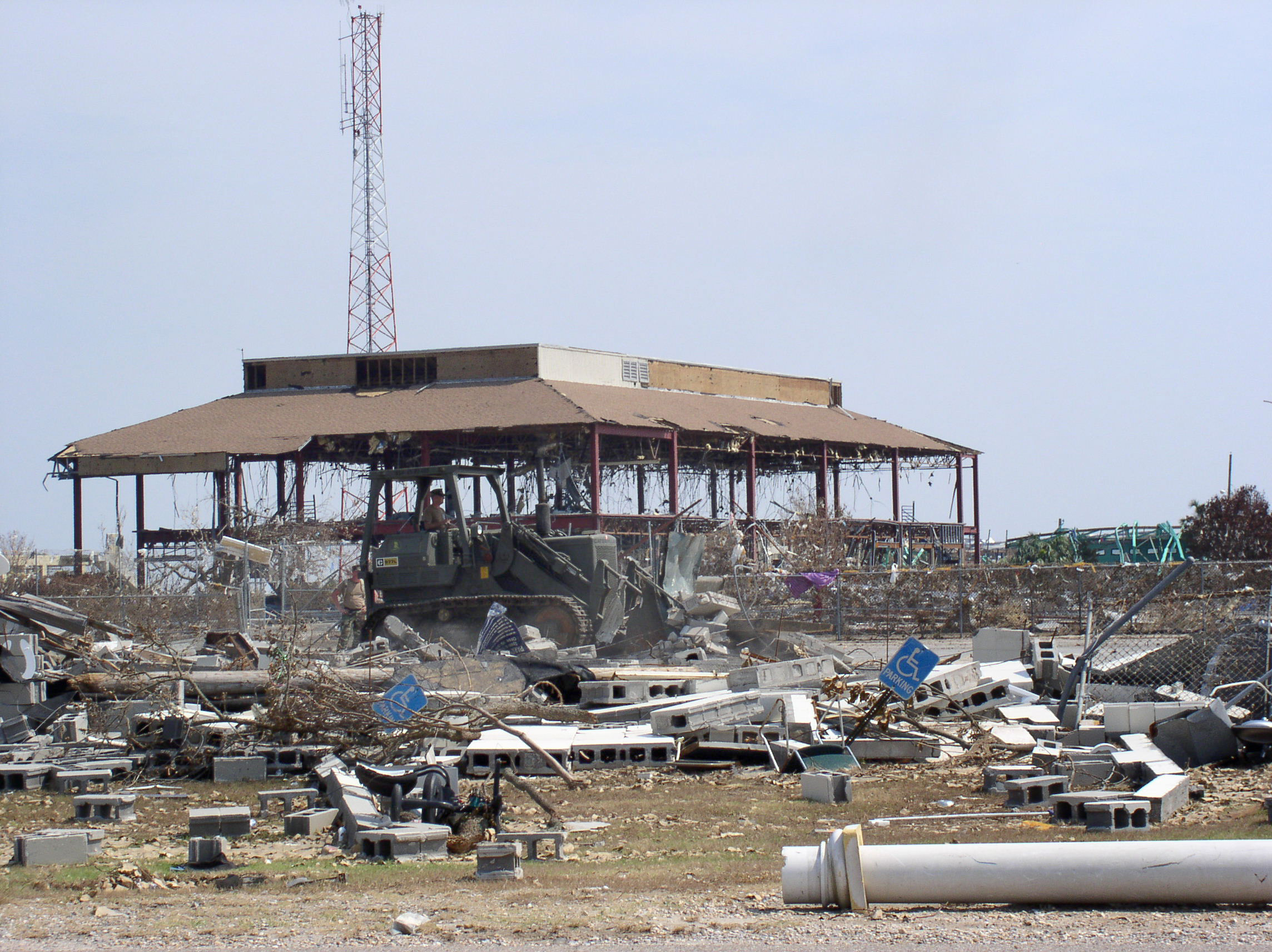
US Navy 050902-N-0000X-017 A U.S. Navy Seabee uses a traxcavator to remove debris from Hurricane Katrina on board Naval Construction Battalion Center (NCBC) Gulfport, Miss

On August 29, 2005 Hurricane Katrina arrived at Gulfport for a two-day stay. The congressional appropriations to repair the damages of those two days was 277.2 million dollars for the NCBC and Stennis Space Center. "Seabee commanders integrated into Gulf Coast county emergency operations centers (EOCs) during the Katrina recovery and helped elected officials prioritize recovery work and align assets for response. These efforts were indicative of the working relationship that has always existed between the Seabees and the Gulf Coast community, according to CBC Commanding Officer Capt. George E. Eichert." All military personnel attached to the NCBC during the recovery received the Armed Forces Service Medal and the Humanitarian Service Medal All the civilians employed by the NCBC received the Armed Forces Civilian Service Medal.

In the first decade of the 21st century, the center was serving more than 4,000 active duty personnel and their families, plus approximately 1,000 Department of Defense civilian personnel.

In 2015, Cheryl Hansen became the first female commander of the Naval Construction Battalion Center.

In 2023, the base built a wall of shipping containers inside its fence to prevent stray bullets from getting to base housing and base buildings. In late 2022, bullets entered the base from a non-Navy housing development, causing damage to buildings and endangering personnel and families. Other incidents followed.

== Groups Homeported at NCBC Gulfport ==
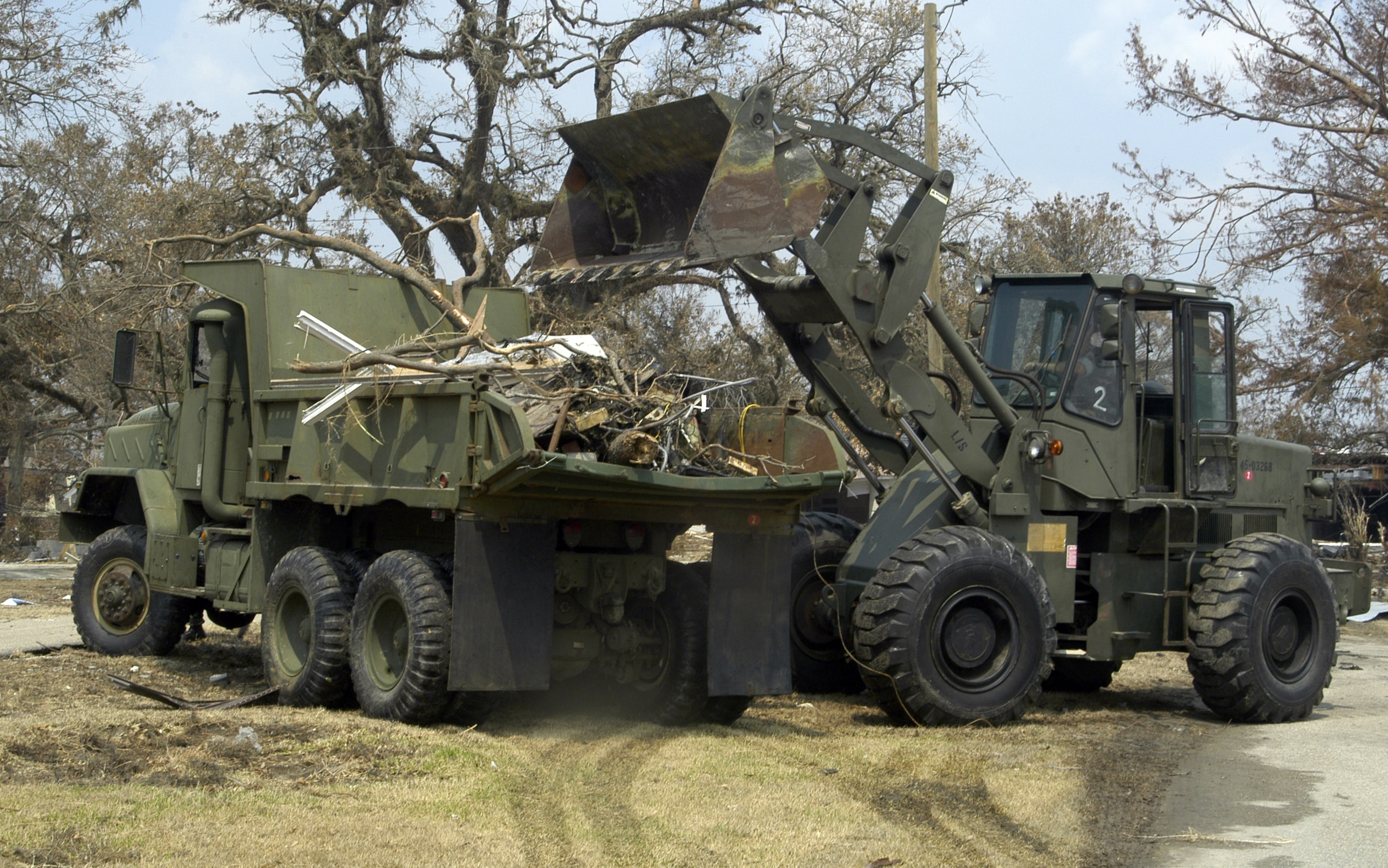
- US Navy 050904-N-6204K-028 A U.S. Navy Seabee front-end loader dumps Katrina debris into a dump truck during clean-up efforts in Biloxi, Miss
  Naval Construction Group TWO
- 22nd Naval Construction Regiment
- Naval Mobile Construction Battalion ONE
- Naval Mobile Construction Battalion 11
- Naval Mobile Construction Battalion 14
- Naval Mobile Construction Battalion 133
- Information Warfare Training Group Gulfport

In addition, the Seabee Heritage Center (the Atlantic Coast Annex of the official Seabee Museum located at Port Hueneme, California) is located on the grounds.

== See also ==
- Admiral Ben Moreell
- Amphibious Construction Battalion One (ACB-1)
- Amphibious Construction Battalion TWO (ACB-2)
- Civil Engineer Corps United States Navy
- List of United States Navy installations
- Naval Construction Battalion
- Naval Mobile Construction Battalion 1
- Naval Mobile Construction Battalion 3
- Naval Mobile Construction Battalion 4
- Naval Mobile Construction Battalion 5
- Naval Mobile Construction Battalion 11
- Naval Mobile Construction Battalion 133
- Naval Construction Battalion Center Port Hueneme
- Naval Amphibious Base Little Creek
- Naval Amphibious Base Coronado
- Seabee
- Seabees in World War II
- Underwater Construction Teams 1 & 2
