= Ben Moreell =

United States Navy admiral (1892–1978)

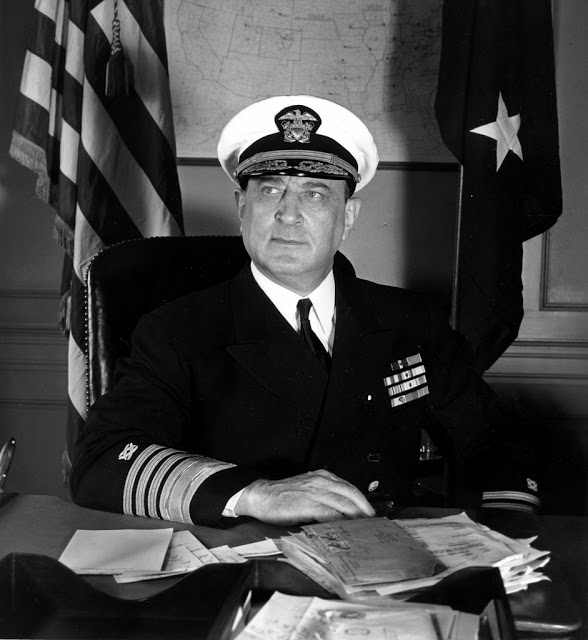
- Father of the Navy Seabees
- Born: September 14, 1892; Salt Lake City, Utah, U.S.
- Died: July 30, 1978 (aged 85); Pittsburgh, Pennsylvania, U.S.
- Burial place: Arlington National Cemetery
- Education: Washington University in St. Louis
- Military career
- Allegiance: United States of America
- Branch: United States Navy
- Service years: 1917–1946
- Rank: Admiral
- Nickname: "King Bee"
- Unit: Civil Engineer Corps (CEC)
- Commands: Bureau of Yards and Docks, Chief Civil Engineer Corps
- Awards: Distinguished Service Medal (2) Legion of Merit Order of the British Empire
- Other work: President, Turner Construction Co. President, CEO & chairman, Jones & Laughlin Steel Corporation

Admiral Ben Moreell (September 14, 1892 – July 30, 1978) was the chief of the U.S. Navy's Bureau of Yards and Docks and of the Civil Engineer Corps. Best known to the American public as the father of the Navy's Seabees, Moreell's life spanned eight decades, two world wars, a great depression and the evolution of the United States as a superpower. He was a distinguished naval officer, an engineer, an industrial giant and a national spokesman.

== Early life ==
Moreell was born into a Jewish family on September 14, 1892, in Salt Lake City, Utah. His family settled in St. Louis, Missouri, where he graduated from St. Louis's Central High School at the top of his class and was awarded a four-year scholarship to Washington University in St. Louis at age 16. After graduating with a civil engineering degree from the McKelvey School of Engineering in 1913, he joined the navy during World War I. In June 1917, he was directly commissioned as a lieutenant junior grade in the Navy's Civil Engineer Corps.

== First World War ==
During the First World War, he was stationed in the Azores, where he became acquainted with assistant secretary of the Navy Franklin D. Roosevelt, and afterwards served at navy yards and installations in Massachusetts, Haiti, Virginia, and Washington.

== Interwar period ==
Moreell was sent as a lieutenant commander to the École Nationale des Ponts et Chaussées in Paris to study European military engineering design and construction practices. In 1933, he returned to the States to supervise what would eventually be called the David W. Taylor Model Basin in Carderock, Maryland.

On December 1, 1937, President Franklin D. Roosevelt selected Commander Moreell to be the Chief of the Bureau of Yards and Docks and the Chief of Civil Engineers of the Navy. This advanced Moreell to the rank of rear admiral, although he had never been a captain. Moreell proposed the construction of two giant drydocks at Pearl Harbor and initiated naval construction projects on Midway Atoll and Wake Island, long before Japanese bombs began to fall on December 7, 1941. The docks were completed in time to repair battleships damaged at Pearl Harbor, and the facilities at Midway were completed in time to play a strategic role in the navy's first significant victory over Japanese forces.

== World War II ==
World War II requirements for advanced bases strung throughout the Pacific called for construction crews to be able to drop their tools and take up weapons at a moment's notice. Moreell believed a militarized Naval Construction Force to build advance bases in the war zone would fulfill this need. On December 28, 1941, he requested authority from the Bureau of Navigation to recruit men from the construction trades for assignment to a Naval Construction Regiment composed of three Naval Construction Battalions; the bureau granted the request on January 5, 1942. On March 5, permission was granted for the construction battalions to use the name "Seabees". Moreell coined the Seabees motto: Construimus, Batuimus (Latin for "We Build, We Fight").

Moreell's Civil Engineer Corps was given command authority over what would become an organization of 250,000 people that built $10 billion worth of facilities to support the war effort. In 1945, Moreell became the Chief of the Navy's Material Division, and at the request of Vice President Harry S. Truman, he negotiated a settlement to the national strike of oil refinery workers. When the government seized the nation's strikebound bituminous coal industry a year later, Moreell was designated the Coal Mines Administrator.

Military advancement:

- June 1917 – lieutenant (junior grade) commissioned
- October 1917 – lieutenant (temporary)
- June 1925 – lieutenant commander
- jumped grade of captain
- December 1937 – rear admiral
- February 1944 – vice admiral
- June 1946 – admiral

== Later life ==
On June 11, 1946, he became the first staff corps officer to achieve the rank of admiral, and was transferred to the retired list three months later. He became the third Jewish American to become a four star admiral. For the next 12 years, Moreell turned his attention to industry, serving first, briefly (October 1946 – March 1947) as president of Turner Construction Company then as president, chief executive officer, and chairman of the board of Jones and Laughlin Steel Company, one of the nation's largest steel manufacturers.

Moreell wrote articles for The Freeman, a publication of the Foundation for Economic Education, a group that advocates free markets and a libertarian philosophy.

Moreell served as chairman of the Task Force on Water Resources and Power of the Second Hoover Commission, directing a 26-man committee from November 1953 through June 1955. Former president Herbert Hoover called the work of this task force "the most far-reaching and penetrating inquiry into our water problems ever made in our history".

Moreell was instrumental in organizing Americans for Constitutional Action (ACA), a conservative national nonpartisan political action organization. His citizenship and service to country was further exemplified by his significant contributions to the Naval Academy itself. He was a member of the board of visitors (1953–1955) and chairman of the board in 1955.

His accomplishments as chairman of the Special Advisory Commission on Future Developments of Academic Facilities is seen today in the Naval Academy's educational complex.

== Awards ==
Moreell's life was punctuated by accomplishments, awards, and well-earned recognition. He received 12 honorary doctoral degrees, was elected to the National Academy of Engineering, and was named one of the 10 men who contributed most to the advancement of construction methods in the United States between 1925 and 1975.

In 1957 Moreell was awarded The John Fritz Medal, referred to as the highest award in the engineering profession, the award is presented each year for scientific or industrial achievement in any field of pure or applied science. It was established in 1902 as a memorial to the great engineer whose name it bears.

When asked which of his honors meant most to him, he replied, "They are all very meaningful and deeply appreciated by me. I accepted all with pride and humility. The following excerpt from the citation for the Distinguished Service Medal presented in 1945 for World War II service gives me the greatest sense of a job 'well done:'

"Displaying great originality, he inspired in his subordinates a degree of loyalty and devotion to duty outstanding in the Naval Service, to the end that the Fleet received support in degree and kind unprecedented in the history of naval warfare."

=== List of orders, decorations and medals ===
- Distinguished Service Medal with gold star (2 awards)
- Legion of Merit
- World War I Victory Medal
- American Defense Service Medal
- American Campaign Medal
- Asiatic-Pacific Campaign Medal
- World War II Victory Medal
- Commander, Order of the British Empire
- Commander, Haitian National Order of Honour and Merit
- Haitian Medal Millitaire

== Legacy ==
The Society of American Military Engineers (SAME) Moreell Medal is named in honor of Moreell. This medal is presented for outstanding contribution to military engineering by a civilian or military member of the U.S. Navy's Civil Engineer Corps. This medal was first awarded in 1955.

Moreell was one of the founders along with Dr. Samuel Moor Shoemaker, rector of Calvary Episcopal Church in Shadyside (Pittsburgh), of The Pittsburgh Experiment, a Christian interdenominational ministry that provides spiritual resources to business, professional and working people. The birthing vision challenge for The Experiment in the 1950s was "to make Pittsburgh as famous for God as it is for steel".

In Moreell's honor the Seabees named their Kuwait facility Camp Moreell, a military compound in Kuwait, Southwest Asia. The facility was home to U.S. Navy Seabees operating in the Persian Gulf region under Task Force Charlie as of early 2003. As of April 2003, Task Force Charlie comprised Seabees from several Naval Construction Force commands.

Moreell Avenue in Quantico, Virginia is named in his honor.

The 68,000-square-foot training facility for the Civil Engineer Corps Officers School (CECOS) in Port Hueneme, California is named Moreell Hall in his honor.

There is a housing area in the Norfolk, Virginia naval complex named for Adm. Moreell.
