= Seabees in World War II =

Naval Construction Battalions
- The Seabee logo
- Founded: 5 March 1942 (formation authorized)
- Country: U.S.
- Branch: U S Navy
- Role: Militarized construction
- Size: 258,000
- Nickname: Seabees
- Motto: "Can Do"
- Colors: United States Navy
- Mascot: Bumblebee
- Engagements: Guadalcanal, Bougainville, Cape Gloucester, Los Negros, Kwajalein, Saipan, Tinian, Guam, Peleliu, Tarawa, Philippines, Iwo Jima, Okinawa, Normandy landing, Sicily, Anzio, North Africa

Commanders
- Notable commanders: Admiral Ben Moreell

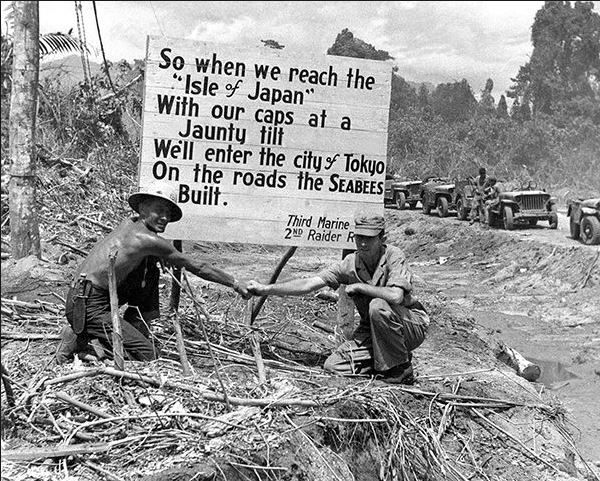
3rd Marine Division, 2nd Raider's sign on Bougainville

The United States Naval Construction Battalions (Seabees) were formed on 5 March 1942 during the induction of The United States in World War II. They primarily served the role of construction in service of the logistics of the war, though some Battalions served in Naval Combat Demolition Units, UDTs, Marine Corps Engineers/Pioneers and the top secret Chemical Warfare Service Flame tank Group. First conceived at the Bureau of Yards and Docks (BuDocks) in the 1930s, the onset of hostilities clarified the need for developing advance bases for the logistical burden of wartime.

Primarily beginning as a volunteer force of already skilled trasdeman, the initial maximum age of service in the Seabees was waived to age 50. It was later found that several past 60 had managed to get in. Men were given advanced rank/pay based upon experience making the Seabees the highest-paid group in the U.S. military. The first 60 battalions had an average age of 37. In December 1942, the volunteer enlistments ceased following an Executive order in favor of conscripted unskilled recruits. To facilitate conscripts making up the Seabees, a series of Construction Training Centers with courses in over 60 trades were established.

During the course of the war, the operations of the Seabees were largely denoted by their use of unofficial and unorthodox means of material acquisition (Note: "Cumshaw" ("Cumshaw definition". Merrian Webster.) "moonlight procurement",) and souvenir making. On 13 February 1945 Chief of Naval Operations, Fleet Admiral Ernest J. King, made the Construction Battalions a permanent Naval element.

== History ==
=== Pre-war naval construction development ===
In the late 1930s the US saw the need to prepare militarily. Congress authorized the expansion of naval Shore Activities in the Caribbean and by 1939 in the Central Pacific. "Following standard peacetime guidelines the Navy awarded contracts to civilian constructions firms. These contractors employed native civilian populations as well as U.S citizens and were answerable to naval officers in charge of construction. By 1941 large bases were being built on Guam, Midway, Wake, Pearl Harbor, Iceland, Newfoundland, Bermuda, and Trinidad to name a few." International law dictated civilians not to resist enemy military attacks. Resistance meant they could be summarily executed as guerrillas. Wake turned out to be a case in point for Americans.

=== World War II ===
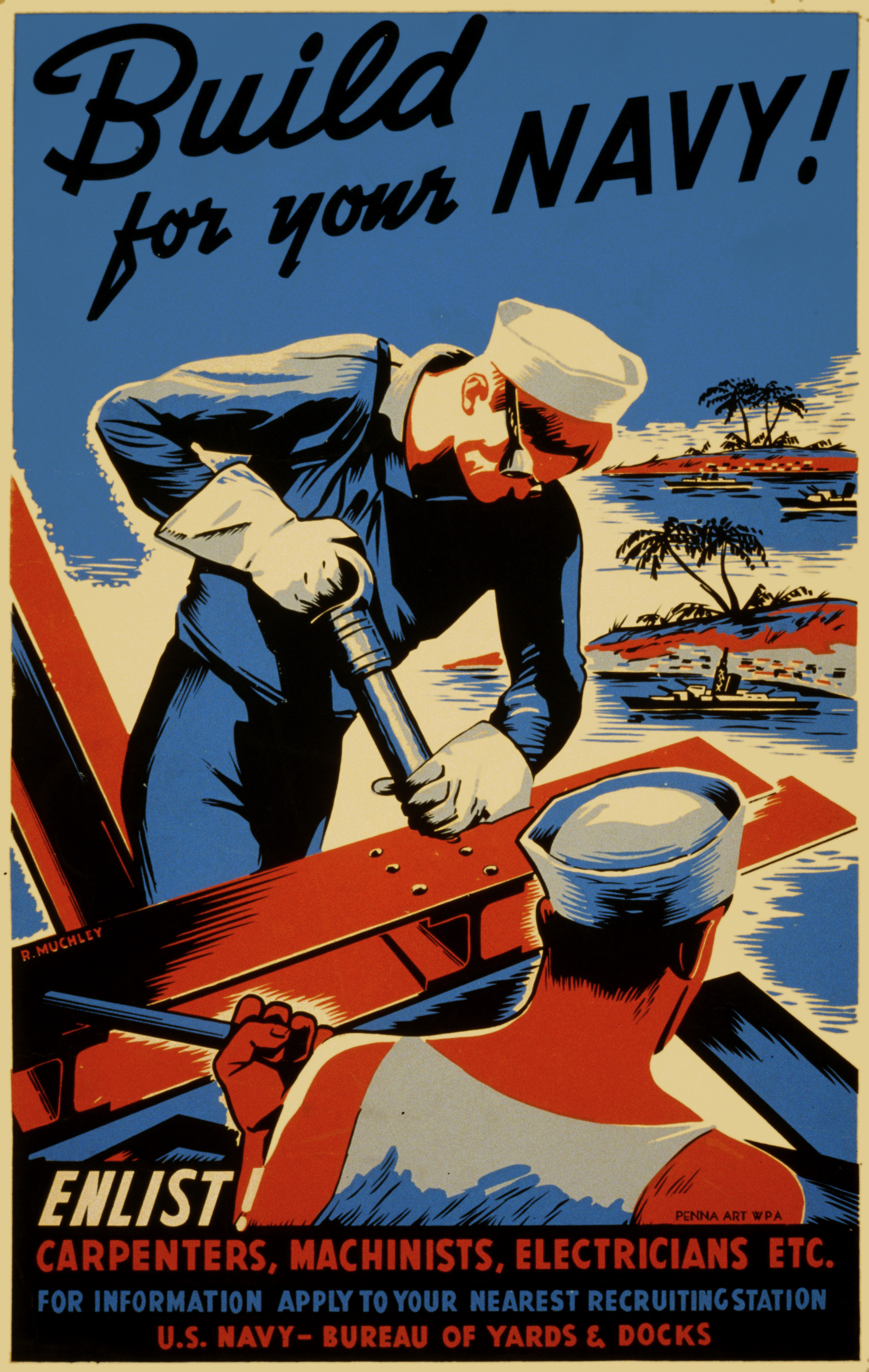
WWII recruitment poster

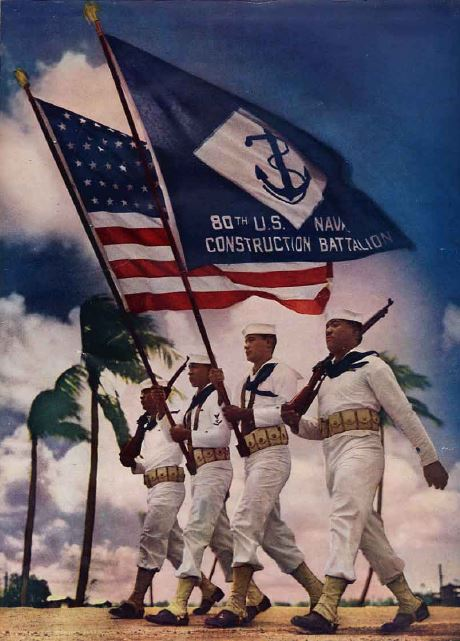
African American Seabee color guard

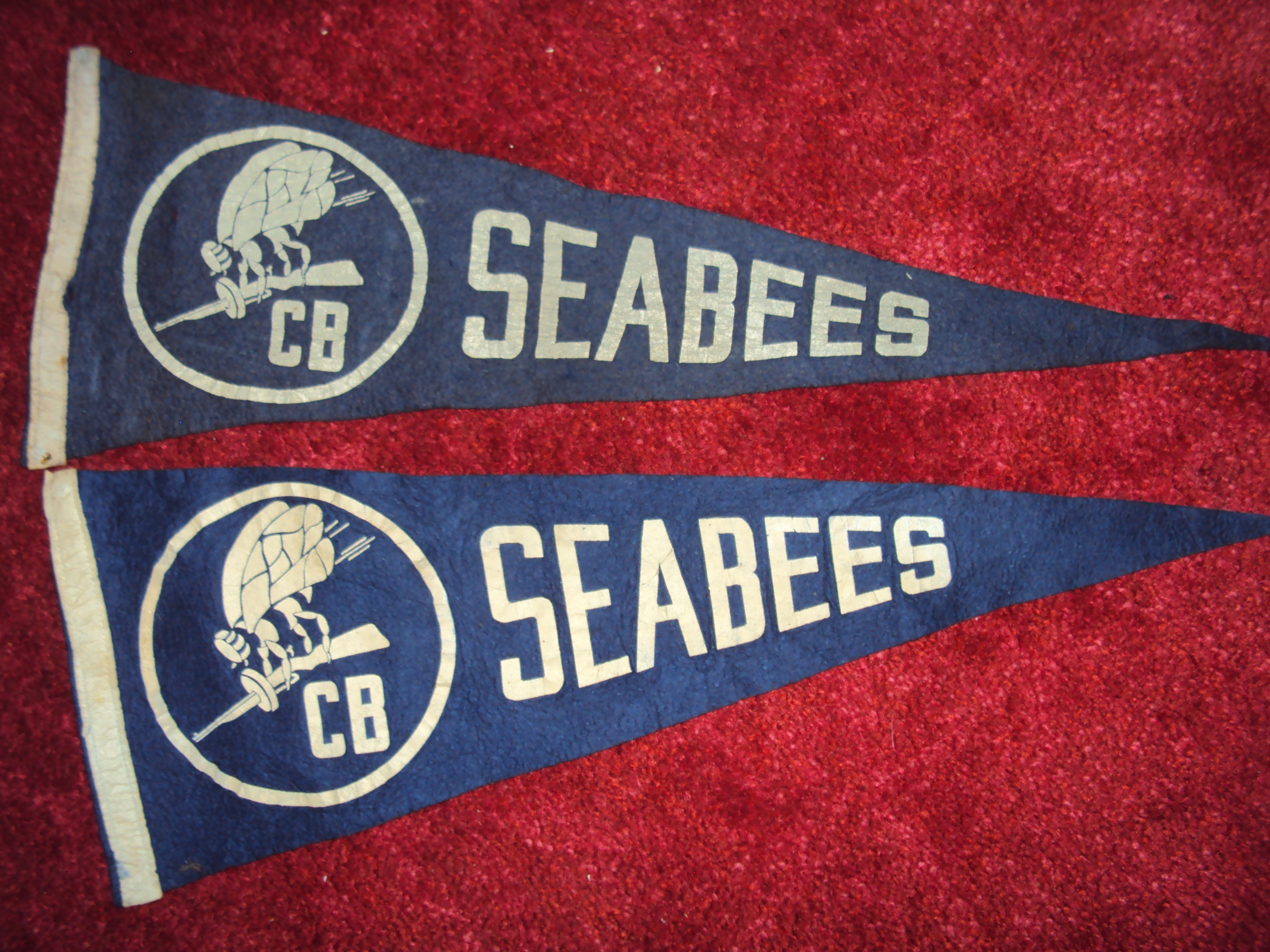
Early Seabee pennants with first pattern Seabee for use as an equipment stencil per BuDocks order (not for uniforms)

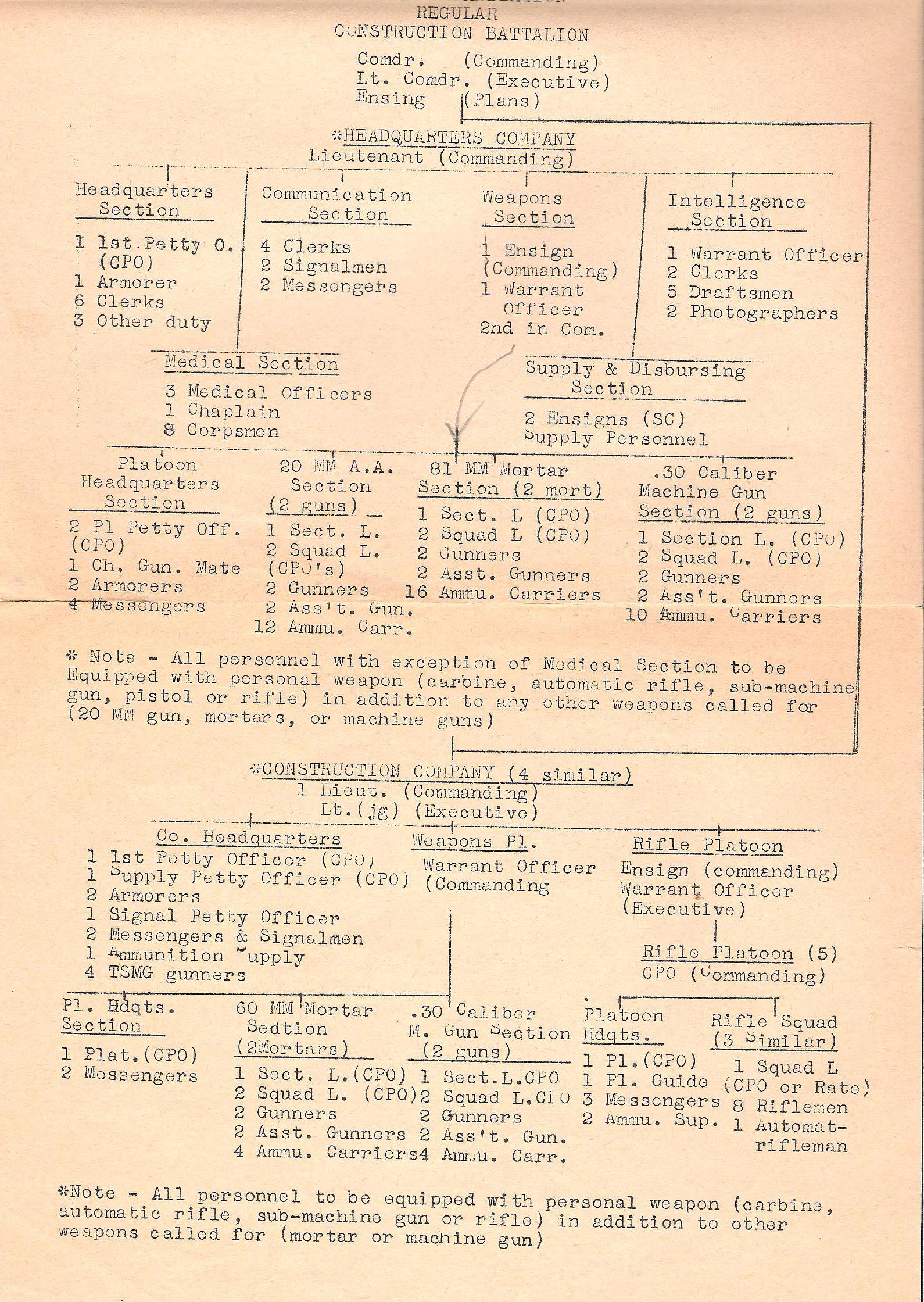
WWII CB Organization. Organic allotment: 8 D8s, 4 D7s, 4 D6, 2 D4 bulldozers.

The need for a militarized construction force became evident after the Japanese Attack on Pearl Harbor. On 28 December, Radm. Moreell requested authority to create Naval Construction Battalions. The Bureau of Navigation gave authorization on 5 January 1942. Three Battalions were officially authorized on 5 March 1942. Enlistment was voluntary until December when the Selective Service System became responsible for recruitment. Seabee Training Centers were named for former heads of the Civil Engineer Corps: Radm. Mordecai T. Endicott, Radm. Harry H. Rousseau, Radm. Richard C. Hollyday, Radm. Charles W. Park and RADM. Robert Peary. One NCTC was named for the first CEC killed in action, Lt. Irwin W. Lee and Lt. (jg) George W. Stephenson of the 24th CB.

An issue for BuDocks was CB command. Navy regulations stated that command of naval personnel was limited to line officers of the fleet. BuDocks deemed it essential that CBs be commanded by CEC officers trained in construction. The Bureau of Naval Personnel strongly objected to this violation of Naval tradition. Radm. Moreell took the issue directly to the Secretary of the Navy. In March the Secretary gave the CEC complete command of all men assigned to CB units. With CBs authorized and the command question settled, BuDocks then had to deal with recruitment, training, military organization structure plus organizing the logistics to make it all work. That all happened quickly. Due to the exigencies of war there was a great deal of "improvisation", a quality that became synonymous with Seabees in general.

At Naval Construction Training Centers (NCTC) and Advanced Base Depots (ABD) on both coasts, men learned: trade skills, military discipline, and advanced combat training. Although technically designated "support", Seabees frequently found themselves under fire with the Marines. After completing boot training in Virginia at Camp Allen and later Camp Peary, the men were formed into CBs or other smaller CB units. The first five battalions were deployed immediately upon completion of training due to the backlog of projects. Battalions that followed were sent to an ABDs at either Davisville, Rhode Island, or Port Hueneme, California, to be staged prior to shipping out. Basic military training was done by the Navy while the Marine Corps provided advanced military training at Camp Peary, Camp Lejeune or Camp Pendelton. About 175,000 Seabees were staged out of Port Hueneme during the war. Units that had seen extended service in the Pacific were returned to the R&R Center at Camp Parks, Shoemaker, CA. There units were reorganized, re-deployed or decommissioned. Men were given 30-day leaves and later, those eligible were discharged. The same was done at the Davisville, Rhode Island, for the east coast.

From California, battalions attached to III Amphibious Corps or V Amphibious Corps, were staged to the Moanalua Ridge Seabee encampment in the Hawaii Territory. It covered 120 acres and had 20 self-contained areas for CB units. Within each area were 6 two-story barracks served by a 1,200 man galley and messhall plus 8 standard quonsets for offices, dispensary, officers quarters and a single large quonset for the ships store. The entire facility had water, sewer, electricity, pavements, armory and a large outdoor theater. A second CB encampment of 4 additional 1000 man Quonset areas was built on Iroquois Point. Battalions attached to the 7th Amphibious Fleet were staged at Camp Seabee next to the ABCD in Brisbane, Australia, then to other US Naval Advance Bases.

=== The Atlantic theater ===
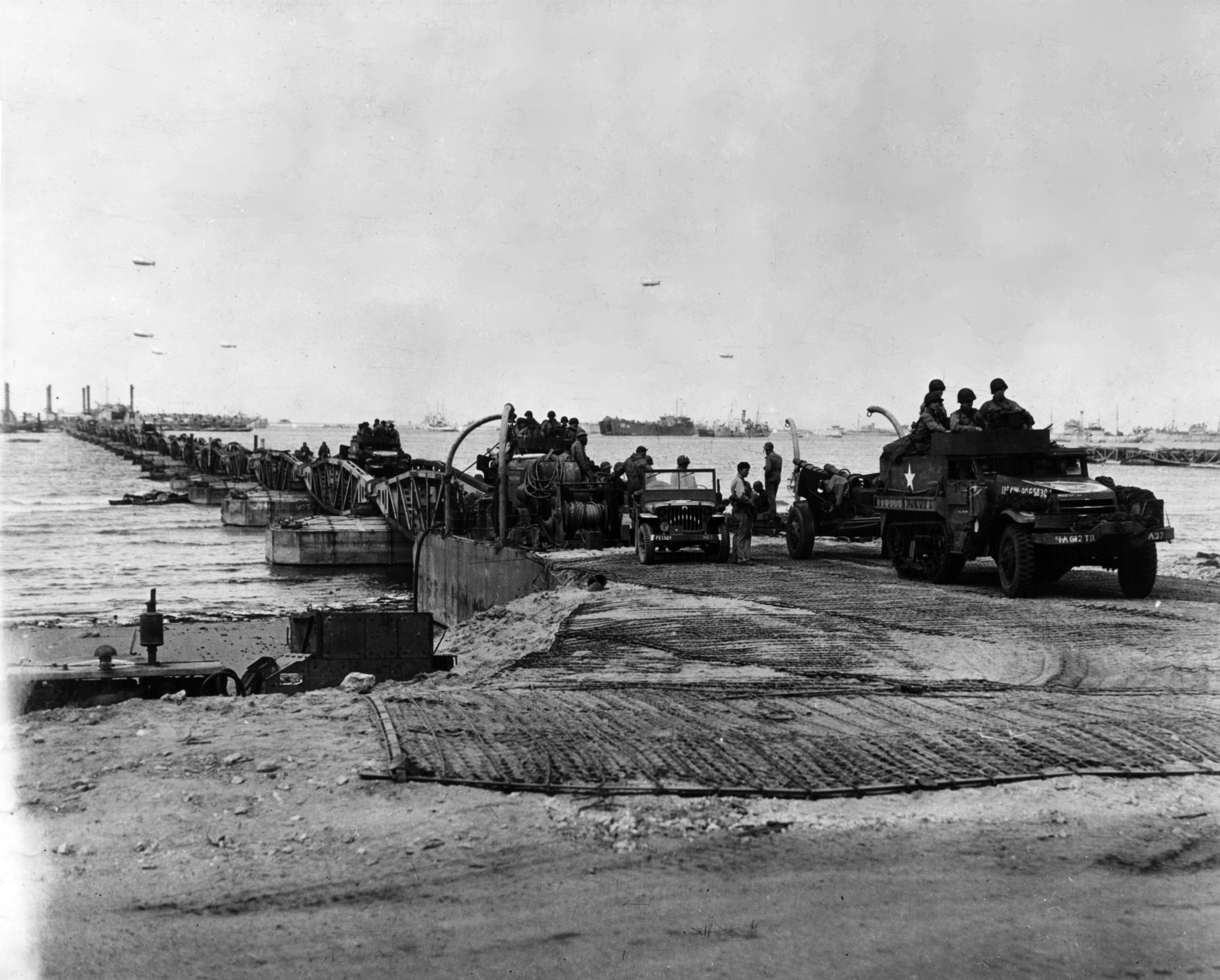
U.S. Army vehicles transit a Seabee assembled causeway off "Mulberry A" at Omaha Beach.

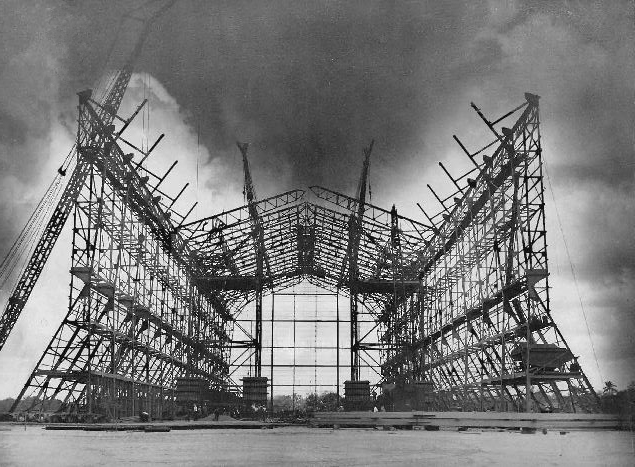
African American Seabees of the 80th CB erecting the framework of an airship hangar on Trinidad. The crane pictured was a "fixed" unit that could not travel. Being fixed allowed the crane to have over 100' of boom and jib. It was one of several that were set up to erect the hangar.

"When the war became a two-ocean war, the Panama Canal became geographically strategic. The convergence of shipping lanes necessitated bases to protect its approaches. Agreements in the Caribbean made that possible as did the Lend Lease Agreement. Under the Greenslade Program naval bases in Puerto Rico, Cuba, and the Panama Canal Zone were all expanded. In Puerto Rico Naval Station Roosevelt Roads was turned into the "Pearl Harbor of the Caribbean. Construction on existing bases was done primarily by civilian contractors until late 1943 when CBs took over. In the Atlantic, the bases formed a line from Bermuda to Brazil. On the Pacific side of the Americas the U.S had bases from the Honduras to Ecuador. The 80th(colored) CB upgraded Carlson airfield on Trinidad. The 83rd CB cut a highway out of Port of Spain, that required moving one million cubic yards of material." "On the Galapagos Islands, CBD 1012 constructed a seaplane base with tank farm and did the same again at Salinas, Ecuador. Salinas would be the southernmost U.S. base in the Pacific. While not in combat zones these bases were necessary for the overall war effort."

"North Africa was the Seabees' first combat. Landing with the assault in November 1942, they built facilities at Oran, Casablanca, Sifi, and Fedala. Later they would build a series of staging and training areas along the Mediterranean including NAS Port Lyautey, Morocco."

"With Tunisia taken the Seabees began prepping pontoon assemblies for their first use in combat at Sicily. This Seabee "innovation" was adapted for amphibious warfare. A pontoon box, standardized in size so multiple pontoons could be quickly assembled like to form causeways, piers, or rhinos to meet the exigencies of amphibious warfare. The beaches of Sicily were considered impossible for an amphibious landing by both the Allies and Axis. The Seabees with their pontoons proved that was not true. The Germans were overwhelmed by the men and material that poured ashore over them.

"Seabee causeways were used again at Salerno and Anzio. Having learned from Sicily the Germans were prepared causing heavy casualties at both. At Anzio Seabees were under extended continuous fire. After Southern Italy the Seabees had one last task in the theater, Operation Dragoon."

"Seabee operations in the North Atlantic began early 1942. The first were in Iceland, Newfoundland, and Greenland. These airfields and ports supported Allied convoys. To complete the defensive line these bases made, Seabees were sent to Londonderry, Northern Ireland, Lough Erne, Loch Ryan, and Rosneath, Scotland. Depots, fuel farms, and seaplane bases were constructed to anchor the line. Afterwards the Seabees went South for Operation Overlord preparations. They built invasion bases from Milford Haven to Exeter and prepared for their own multifaceted D-day role."

On D-Day Seabees were the first ashore as Naval Combat Demolition Units (NCDU). Their task was to remove German defensive beach obstructions built to impede amphibious landings. "They came under very heavy fire, but were able to detonate their charges opening gaps allowing the assault to land. Once again Seabees placed pontoon causeways over which the assault to reach land." "Seabees also brought their Rhino ferries, a motorized adaptation of their modular pontoon boxes. With them, vast amounts of men and material went ashore. For the American sector Seabees assembled piers, and breakwaters into Mulberry A. It was a temporary port until French ports were liberated. Even after weather disabled the Mulberry, Seabee handiwork got thousands of tons supplies and troops ashore."

"The liberation of Cherbourg and Le Havre gave CBs major projects. These were the harbors that would replace Mulberry A. Foreseeing the Allies would want harbors the Germans had left them in ruins. At Cherbourg the first cargo landed 11 days of the Seabees and within a month it was handling 14 ships simultaneously. Seabees repeated this at Le Havre and again at Brest, Lorient, and St. Nazaire."

The last Seabee task in Europe was the crossing of the Rhine. The U.S. Army asked the Navy for Seabees to do the job. General Patton ordered they wear Army fatigues to do it. Their first crossing was at Bad Neuenahr near Remagen and the Seabees made the operation work as planned. On 22 March 1945, they put Patton's armor across at Oppenheim, on pontoon ferries and landing craft that had been trucked overland from the coast. More than 300 craft were brought inland to make the crossing possible. One crew even took Prime Minister Churchill across.

"The 69th was the only CB to set foot on German soil. They also were the first CB to deploy by air. They were flown to Bremen in April tasked to repair damaged buildings and the power grid for the allied occupation force. Making Bremerhaven harbor operational also fell to them. One detachment's project was the U.S. Navy Hq in Germany at Frankfurt-am-Main. By August 1945 the battalion was back in England concluding NCF Atlantic operations."

=== The Pacific theater ===
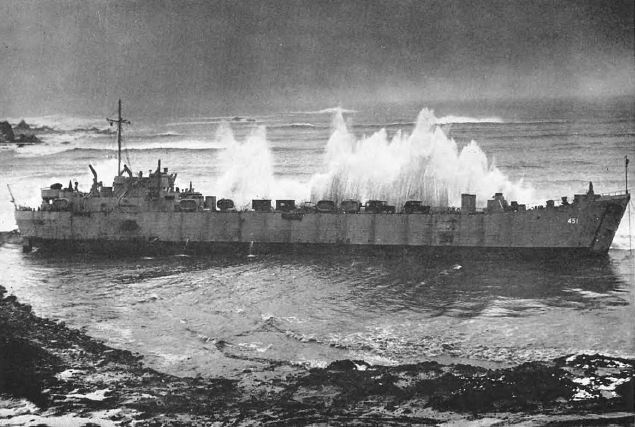
LST 451 beached and holed at Tanaga Island by gale force winds. CB 45 put damage control parties aboard working round the clock five days to save her.

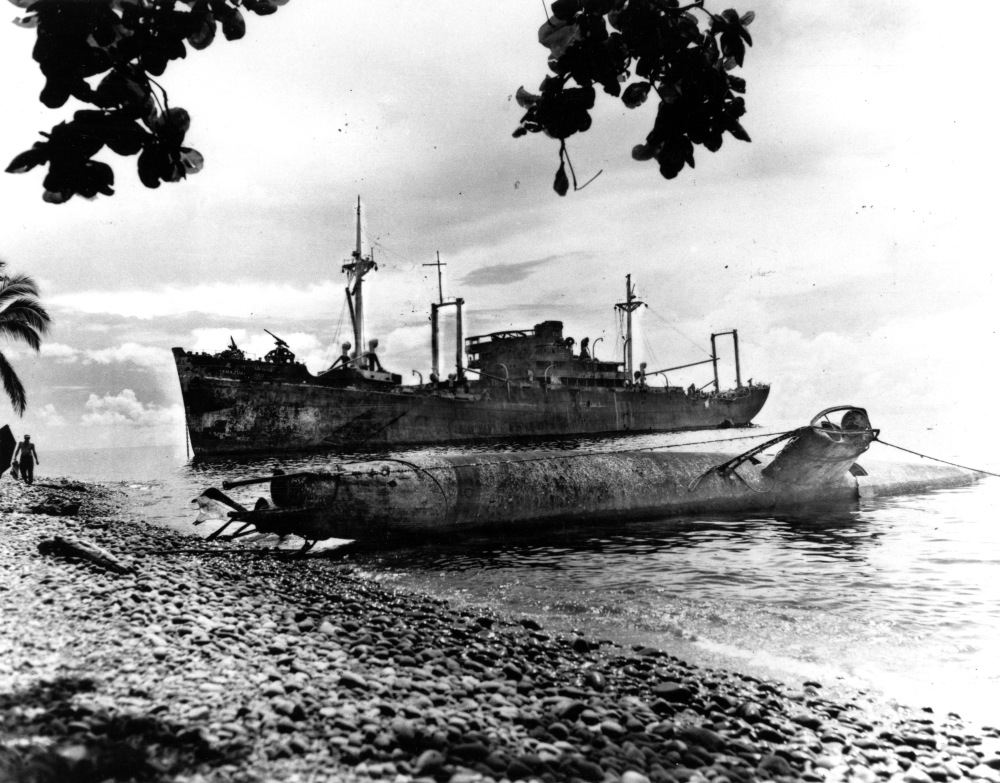
Type A Kō-hyōteki-class submarine two-man sub salvaged by 6th CB divers off Tassafaronga Point

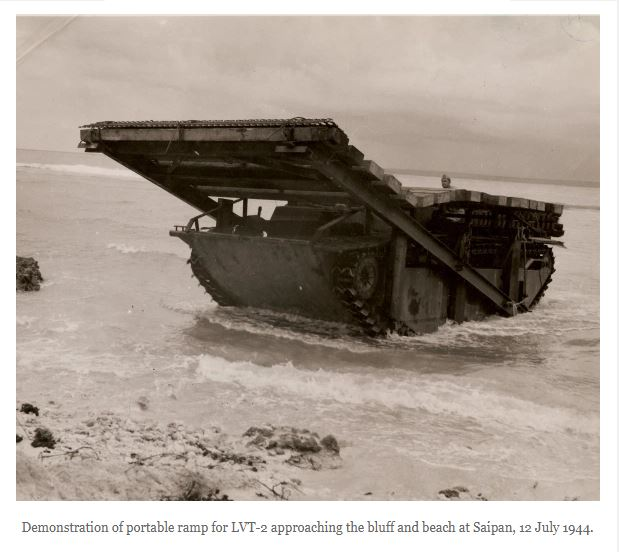
LVT-2 modified by Seabees of 3/18 and 3/20 Marines that enabled the assault on Tinian

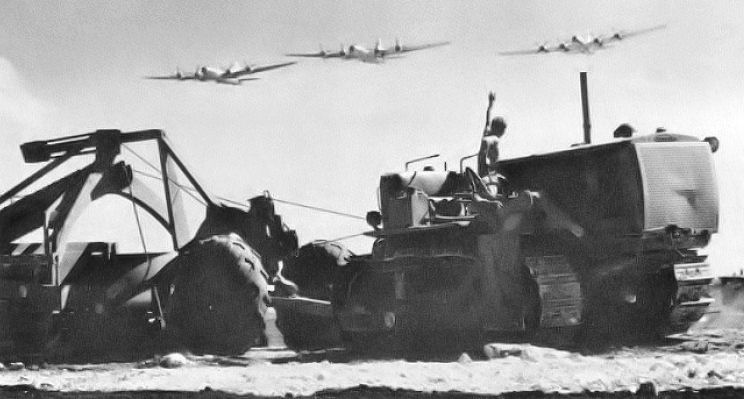
B-29s passing over a Seabee bulldozer tournapull unit on Tinian 1944

"Pacific Seabee deeds were historically unparalleled. It was there that 80% of the NCF literally built the road to VJ-day constructing nearly all the airfields, piers, ammunition bunkers, supply depots, hospitals, fuel tanks, and barracks required to make it happen on over 300 islands." The very first job Seabees had a hand in was the salvage of the USS California (BB-44) and USS West Virginia (BB-48) at Pearl Harbor under the command of a CEC Lieutenant. He had Seabee divers and 120 men from the 16th CB before he was done.

Very shortly after their formation the Marine Corps took an interest in this other Naval ground force. This would lead to a unique relationship with the Naval Construction Force that remains at present. The first combat interaction the two had was the Battle of Guadalcanal and Henderson Airfield. Marine reports to the Commandant were such that the Corps requested Construction Battalions be assigned to the Corps. The Navy had not considered this possibility in CB planning. As it was, the Navy didn't have enough CBs for the plans that were on the drawing boards, the Corps was told no. Not for long. The 18th, 19th, and 25th Construction Battalions were transferred. Between them, the 18th and 19th disputed which was the first to join the Corps. Because a USMC battalion has 3 companies and a CB has 4, one company from each of those battalions was used to create the 51st CB. She was attached to 3rd Amphibious Corps. At wars end there were a half dozen battalions transferred and renumbered into the USMC system. Most were the third battalion of an engineering regiment The troops were issued a complete USMC dufflebag. The 18th CB was coincidently assigned to the 18th Marines. She received a PUC for action on Tarawa. The very first Seabees, the Bobcats received their USMC training in the field and landed on Eniwetok Island with the 22nd Marines. Shortly after, the Navy recalled the transferred CBs and the Corps decommissioned all the engineering regiments. However, for landing assaults the Corps had CBs temporarily assigned to fill shore party assignments on Iwo Jima and Okinawa.

"The entire Pacific from Australia to Alaska and the Aleutians were in the Japanese theater of operations. In 1942 they occupied the islands of Attu and Kiska. Seabees sent to the North were there to work on stalling Japanese strategy. By late June 1942 bases were being built on Adak and Amchitka which served as deterrents for the remainder of the war." While in the region CBs dealt with tasks beyond construction. Twice CB 45 had ships beached on their Tanaga Island doorstep. They assisted the evacuations of both the USS Ailanthus (AN-38) and the LST 451. They put damage control crews aboard the LST. Working round the clock they salvaged the ship. On another salvage operation in the Aleutians CB 4 had divers in the water. And, CBMU 1058 was sent into Naval Petroleum Reserve 4 to drill for oil as well as survey a potential pipeline route that remains utilized today.

"The first CB projects were on Bora Bora where the 1st CB Detachment arrived February 1942. They took the name "Bobcats" for their own from the Operation's code name BOBCAT. They deployed before the "Seabee" name was created. Their project was a fuel depot on a down under route to Australia. They encountered typical issues of the tropics: incessant rain, multiple types of dysentery, numerous skin problems, and the dreaded elephantiasis. Combined they made conditions miserable, and were harbingers of what was awaiting Seabees elsewheres. That detachment was beset with difficulties, but gained satisfaction when the island's tank farms fueled Task Force 44 for the Battle of the Coral Sea."

Following the Bobcats the 2nd and 3rd Construction Battalion Detachments were formed. The 2nd went to Tongatapu while the 3rd went to New Hebrides both on down under routes also. Their projects would support operations in the Coral Sea and the Solomon Islands. The New Hebrides became strategic when the Japanese took Guadalcanal and started building airfields. The 3rd CB Det was rushed from Efate to Espiritu Santo to build a countermanding field asap. Within 20 days a 6000' airstrip was operational and the groundwork started on the Espiritu Santo Naval Base.

CB 3 sent a detachment to Bora Bora to augment the Bobcats. In the fall of 1943 all of those Seabees were ordered to join CB 3 at Noumea. En route they were redesignated the 3rd Battalion 23rd Marines. The remainder of CB 3s A Co was transferred to the 22nd as well. Neither the Bobcats nor A Co had not received advanced military training before deploying so the 22nd Marines gave them all an intense field version on Bora Bora. Afterwards the regiment returned to Hawaii for amphibious warfare training. For the Marshalls landings 3rd Battalion was tasked as shore party, engineers and demolitions men. They would see extensive combat at the Battle of Eniwetok. When those operations were over the 22nd Marines were given a Naval Unit Commendation and the Bobcats and A Co 3 CB were released by the Marines.

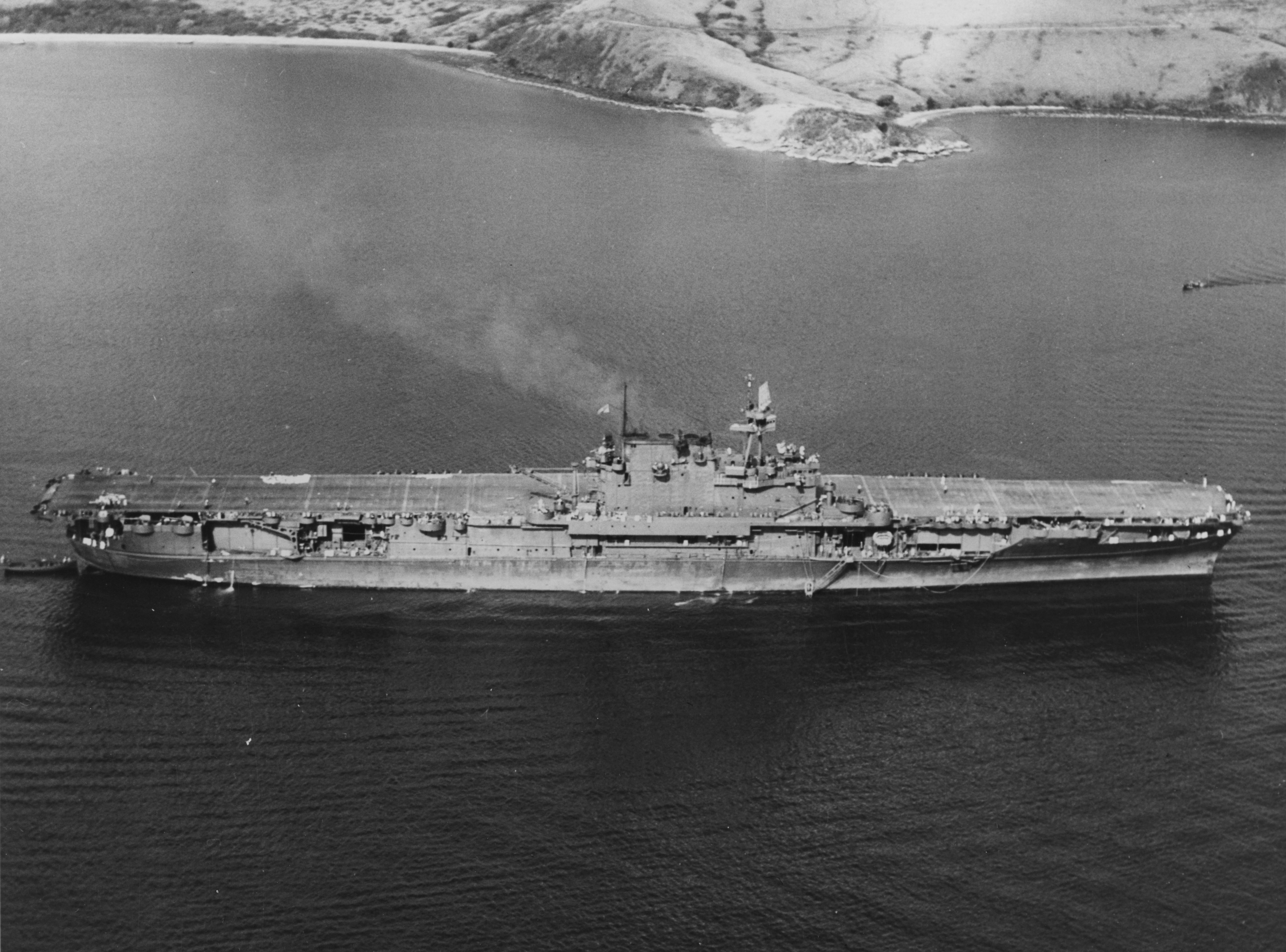
USS Enterprise (CV-6) at Noumea, New Caledonia, 10 November 1942, undergoing emergency repairs by CB 3

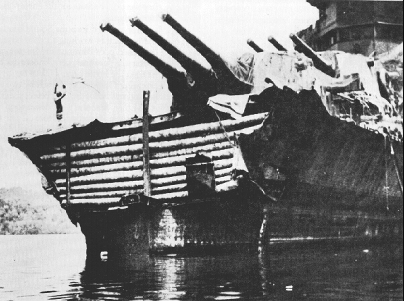
USS Minneapolis at Tulagi with the battle dressing that enabled her to meet the USS Vestal at Espiritu Santo. CB 6 had a lumbering operation at Tulagi that provided the logs.

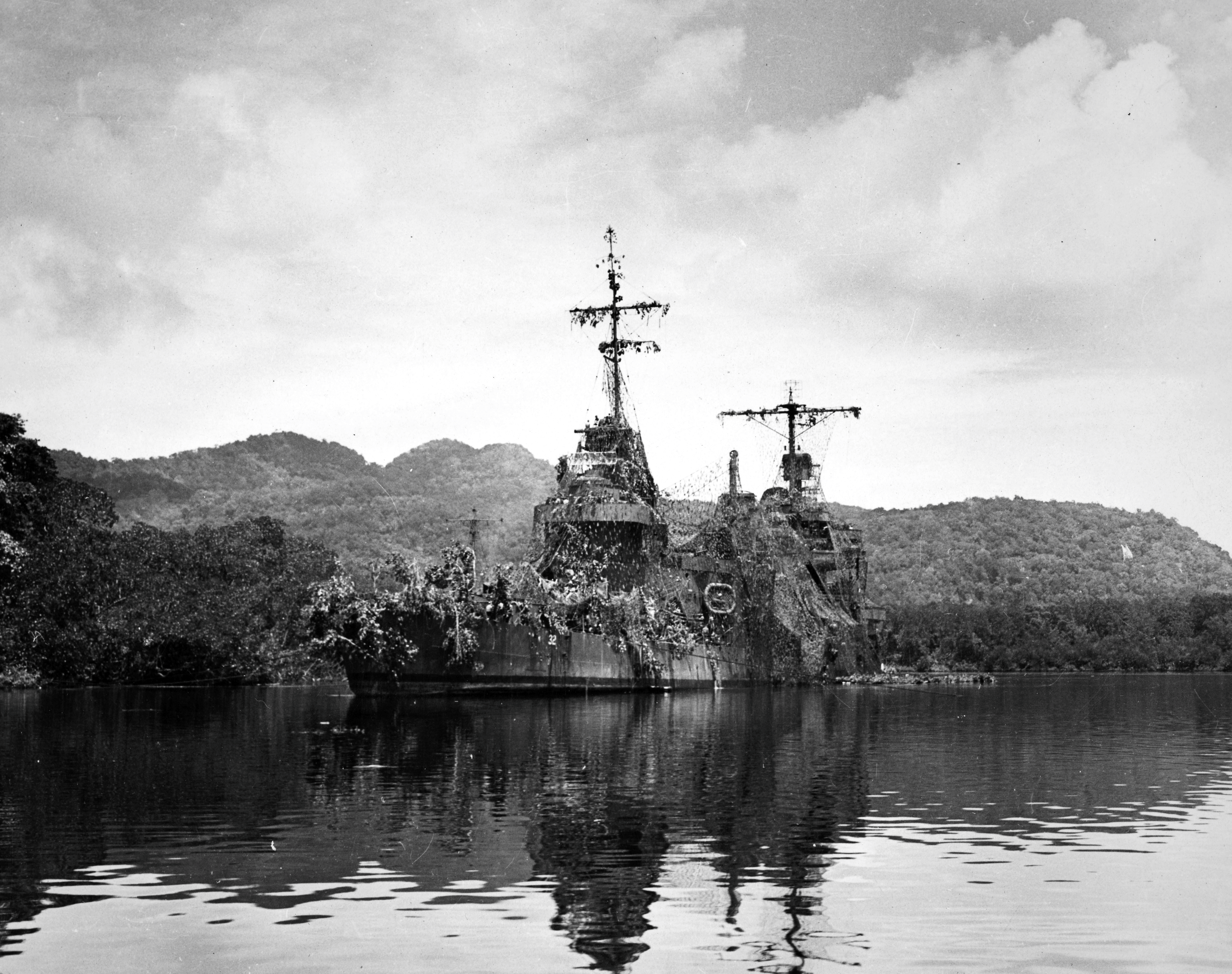
USS New Orleans at Tulagi needing the same repairs at the same time. NARA (80-G-216013).

On 30 October 1942 the USS Enterprise (CV-6) pulled into Noumea damaged from the Battle of Santa Cruz. She was the only air craft carrier remaining west of Pearl Harbor, but had a bomb go through the flight deck at the bow. Two of enterprise's aircraft elevators were out of commission as well as a torpedo elevator. The flight deck arrestor cables were severed and their gear damaged. One near miss was midships below the waterline while another was adjacent the elevator hit. B Co. from CB 3 put 75 men aboard her to assist effect emergency repairs en route to the first naval Battle of the Solomons. Underway to engage the enemy, the Seabees focused on the repairs even into the battle. They had worked round-the-clock under the Enterprise's damage control officer along with 40 men off the repair ship USS Vestal. He wrote that on 11 November: "She made the open sea with her decks ... shaking and echoing to air hammers, with welders' arcs sparking ... and with her forward elevator still jammed ... since the bomb ... broke it in half." On 13 November the ship's captain notified SOPAC in Noumea that "The emergency repairs accomplished by this skillful, well-trained, and enthusiastically energetic force have placed this vessel in condition for further action against the enemy". Those repairs enabled the Enterprise to engage and sink the Japanese battleship Hiei that day. Over the next three days her planes would be involved in the sinking of 16 and damaging another 8. When it was over Vice Admiral Bull Halsey knew what those Seabee repairs meant to the outcome. He sent a commendatory letter to the Seabee's OIC, Lt. Quayle: "Your commander wishes to express to you and the men of the Construction Battalion serving under you, his appreciation for the services rendered by you in effecting emergency repairs during action against the enemy. The repairs were completed by these men with speed and efficiency. I hereby commend them for their willingness, zeal, and capability." At Pearl Harbor in November 1942, 120 steel workers, riggers, and electricians from the 16th CB were responsible for salvaging the USS West Virginia far faster than Navy estimates. Divers from the 16th CB assisted in the salvage of the USS Oklahoma. The 27th CB created its own "Ships Repair Shop" as a courtesy to the fleet. Its divers replaced 160 damaged ship's props. That "Shop" logged major repairs on 145 vessels, including 4 submarines.

The 6th CB was the first CB to see combat. They did so with the 1st Marine Division on Guadalcanal keeping Henderson Field operational. The Japanese made this a never-ending job, bombing it as fast as the Seabees repaired it. The first Seabee given a Silver Star was there." The Marines/Seabees made simultaneous landings on Guadalcanal and Tulagi Island. On Tulagi it was to construct an advance PT base. Its boats became famous for their operations in the "slot" PT Squadron 3 was there and requested Seabee volunteers nightly to fill out its crews. It also became Headquarters Motor Torpedo Boat So. Pacific Command MTBSoPac. News worthy to the troops at the time, off Tassafaronga Point on Guadalcanal, Seabees in a Higgins boat ran into the periscope of a sunk Japanese two-man sub 300 yd (270 m) offshore. It was in 20 ft (6.1 m) of water and with improvised diving gear they hooked cables for bulldozers to pull it ashore. With bulldozers straining on the cables, a dynamite blast was used to free it of the mud suction force and it was beached. It became a "must see" for U.S troops on the island.

Like CBs, PTs were new in WWII. The Seabees would build 119 PT bases or Cubs. The largest would be on Mios Woendi. Many battalions were involved, however, the 113th and 116th CBs had PT Advance Base Construction Detachments. The 113th's detachment was attached to Task Group 70.1 through the end of the war. It was a precursor to postwar Seabee teams. Each man was cross-trained in multiple trades with some qualified as corpsmen or divers.

Down under deployments had CBs building bases in New Zealand and Australia. As the war island-hopped the Seabees landed in assaults with New Zealanders and Australians on multiple islands to build airfields for joint RNZAF, RAAF, U.S. Army Air Corps operations. There were some airfields like Turtle Bay that were built for joint USMC RNZAF use. Kukum Field on Guadalcanal was home at various times to RNZAF Squadrons 1, 2, 3, 14, 15, 16, and 17 as well as the USAAF. On Noemfoor the 95th CB repaired three airfields that would service RAAF 22, 30, 37, 75, 76, and 80 Squadrons. On the Solomons, Russells, Rendova, New Georgia, and Bougainville CBs turned all into some kind of advanced base. "Mid-1943 Merauke, New Guinea got an air strip and comm station at Port Moresby. In December Seabees with the 1st Marine Division landed at Cape Gloucester. There, Seabees of the 19th Marines bulldozed trails for the armor beyond the front lines so far they had to be told to hold up. A Co 87th CB had to visit the armory for combat gear prior to joining the 3rd New Zealand Division. The 3rd New Zealander's took Seabees with them in taking the Green and Treasury Island groups. Japanese occupied Papua, New Guinea, and New Britain was Australian administered Territory that saw Battalions from Camp Seabee Brisbane.

Prior to Cape Gloucester the 1st Marine Division posted notice requesting flight qualified volunteers to form an aviation unit of Piper L4 Grasshoppers. Sixty stepped forward with a dozen having flight time. A Seabee in the 17th Marines, MM2 Chester Perkins, was one. Perkins and the others were put through two months training for recon and artillery spotting once the Pipers arrived. He logged over 200 hours dropping flares ammo, medical supplies, observing troop movements, and providing taxi service to officers. For this Maj. Gen. Rupertus, USMC promoted him to Staff sergeant/Petty officer 1st class and Admiral Nimitz wrote him and the other flyers commendations for the Navy Air Medal.

"The Admiralities became key to isolating Rabaul and the neutralization of New Britain. The seizure of Manus Island and Los Negros Island cut supplies from all points north and east. By 1944 Seabees had transformed those islands into the largest Lion and Oak in the Southwest Pacific. The Lion became the main supply and repair depot of the Seventh Fleet. The capture of Emirau completed the encirclement of Rabaul. A strategic two-field Oak, with depots, dry dock, and PT base was constructed there."

"The Central Pacific saw CBs both landing in all the assaults, their efforts moved the U.S relentlessly toward the Japanese homeland. Tarawa in the Gilberts was bad, but in fifteen hours Seabees had the airfield operational. They turned Majuro Atoll into one of the fleet's Lions and similarly transformed Kwajalein Atoll into a Oak."

"Seizure of the Marianas turned the Pacific war. Their loss cut the Japanese defense and placed Japan within bomber range. Operation Forager saw CBs make significant contributions at the Kwajalein, Saipan, Guam, and Tinian. On Siapan and Tinian top secret Seabee handiwork was fielded by the 2nd and 4th Tank Battalions, flamethrowing tanks. Within four days of capture, Seabees had Aslito on Saipan operational. During the battle for Guam, CB Specials did stevedoring while others were Marine combat engineers. When they were done CBs turned Guam into a Lion for the fleet and an Oak for the air corps. The invasion of Tinian was a showcase of Seabee ingenuity and engineering. The CEC engineered detachable ramps mounted on LVT-2s making landings possible where the Japanese thought it was impossible. Before the island was even secure, Seabees were completing an unfinished Japanese airfield."

During 1944 dredging harbors to facilitate movement of men, supplies, and vessels became an unheralded priority. The 301st CB was formed to do the job and given four demolitioneers from the UDTs, two of them ex-NCDU. Between them they had three Silver stars and one Bronze.

"Once the Marianas were taken B-29s needed an emergency field and a forward base for fighter escort. Iwo Jima was chosen for V Amphibious Corps to assault on 19 February 1945. The assault had four battalions tasked as shore party: 4th & 5th Pioneers and 31st & 133rd CBs. The 133rd suffered the most casualties in Seabee history tasked to the 23rd Marines D-day-D+18. Only basic road construction was accomplished during the first days. The Marines requested Seabee heavy equipment operator volunteers to augment their beach depots for the assault D-day. CBs 8 and 95 each sent two dozen men. Work on the first airfield began on D+5. Two Seabees from the 117th CB accompanied the flamethrowing tanks they had created to provide technical field support. On Iwo Jima it got so that the Marines would hold up the assault to wait for one of their Seabee built flamethrowing tanks. Post-battle, the battalions had demolition teams scout and clear areas to provide safe construction sites.

"Island hopping CBs made Hollandia instrumental in reclaiming the Philippines. The 3rd Naval Construction Brigade was part of MacArthur's return to Leyte. Seabee pontoons brought MacArthur's Forces ashore. The 3rd was joined by the 2nd and 7th NCF Brigades. Together they numbered 37,000 and together they turned the Philippines into a huge advance base. The 7th Amphibious Force moved HQ there with CBs building everything: fleet anchorages, sub bases, fleet repair facilities, fuel and supply depots, Pt bases and airfields. At Dulag, Leyte Seabee industry became an issue to the Japanese. There, the 61st CB had an air strip detachment assaulted by Japanese paratroopers. The assault lasted 72 hours with the Japanese losing over 350 men. As in the South Pacific, PTs had Seabees augmenting crews on runs along Halmahera in the Lembeh Strait.

"At Okinawa the 24th Army Corps and Third Marine Amphibious Corps landed off Rhinos and causeways of the 130th CB. The 58th, 71st, and 145th CBs were attached to the three Marine Division. The Seabees created an entire battalion of flamethrowing tanks for the assault. Numerous CBs followed, as Okinawa became the anticipated jumping-off point for invasion of Japan. Nearly 55,000 in four CB brigades were there. By August 1945 everything was prepped for the invasion." In the three months it took to secure the Island, seven stevedore battalions offloaded 2,000,000 tons. There were three airfields that were crucial to the campaign. The African American Seabees of the 34th CB drew the task of getting the Awase airfield operational and did.

When the USS Indianapolis (CA-35) delivered the atomic bomb to Tinian 6th Brigade Seabees unloaded the components, stored and posted guard. When technicians assembled the weapon Seabees assisted as needed. On 6 August it was loaded into Enola Gay, a B-29 bomber, for the bombing of Hiroshima. When the war ended 258,872 officers and enlisted had served in the Seabees. Their authorized allotment of 321,056 was never reached. The war saw over 300 Seabees killed in action while over 500 died on the job site. U.S. Fleet Admiral Halsey: "The Seabees helped crush the Japs in every South Pacific campaign".

=== Lions, Cubs, Oaks, Acorns advance base units ===
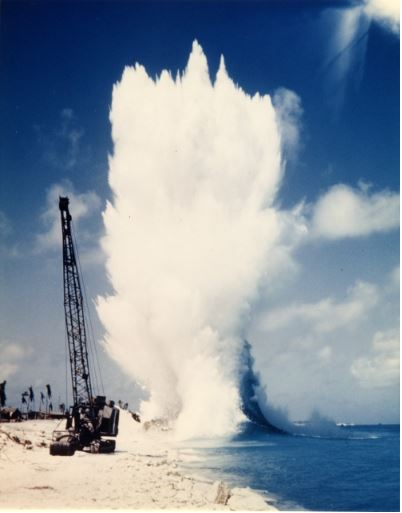
Blasting on shoreline during construction of airfield on Eniwetok Atoll in June 1944

Advance base construction operations were given a code name as a numbered metaphor for the size/type of base the Seabees were to construct and assigned to it the "unit" charged with development and administration of that base. These were Lion, Cub, Oak and Acorn with a Lion being a large Fleet Base numbered 1–6. Cubs were Secondary Fleet Bases 1/4 the size of a Lion (numbered 1–12 and most often for PT boats) Oak and Acorn were the names given airfields, new or captured enemy fields (primary and secondary in size). Cubs were quickly adopted as the primary type airfield with few Oaks. Of the three base types Lions, Cubs and Acorns, Acorns received priority due to their tactical importance and the speed at which the Seabees could make one operational. The Navy believed the Seabees could produce an operational runway overnight. In the Office of Naval Operations manual for Logistics of Advance Bases it reads " Highly mobile Acorns ... can be established by surprise tactics between sunset and sunrise on enemy territory ... (are) strategically important ... offensive instruments possessing tactical surprise to a highly portentous degree."

Camp Bedilion was home to the Acorn Assembly and Training Detachment responsible for training and organizing Acorn units. It shared a common fenceline with Camp Rousseau at Port Hueneme. A Lion, Cub, or Acorn was composed of three components: Base Operation units, Fleet/Aviation repair-maintenance units and Construction Battalion personnel. CBs constructed, repaired or upgraded 111 major airfields with the number of acorn fields not published. When the code was first created the Navy thought it would require two CBs to construct a Lion. By 1944 entire Construction Regiments were being used to build Lions.

Lions, Cubs, Oaks, Acorns USN Administration in WWII: ACORN: acronym for Aviation, Construction, Ordnance, Repair. A CBMU was attached to every ACORN. A single island could have multiple Acorns on it. It was common practice to separate airfields for bombers and fighters. In December 1944 the Navy took over an unused Army Air Corps base at Thermal, CA. making it Naval Air Field Thermal. The Navy made it the pre-embarkation and training center for Acorns, CASUs, and CBMUs.

- Lion 1 Espiritu Santo (1st, 7th 15th, and 40th CBs)
- Lion 4 Manus
- Lion 6 Guam
- Lion 8 Okinawa
- Cub 1 Guadalcanal
- Cub 2 Tulagi
- Cub 3 Nadi, Fiji
- Cub 9 Guadalcanal
- Cub 12 Emirau
- Acorn 1 Guadalcanal
- Acorn Red 1 Guadalcanal
- Acorn (Red) 2 Espiritu Santo
- Acorn 3 Banika/south
- Acorn Red 3 New Caledonia/Russell Islands
- Acorn 4 Tulagi
- Acorn 5 Woodlark
- Acorn 7 Emirau (47th CB)
- Acorn 8 Nouméa
  - Munda Point
  - Biak
- Acorn 9 Green Island
- Acorn 10 Green Islands
- Acorn 11 Solomon Islands
- Acorn 12 Banika/Sterling Island
- Acorn 13 Espiritu Santo (bomber field 1)
- Acorn 14 Tarawa
- Acorn 15 Green Islands (93rd CB)
- Acorn 16 Apamama
- Acorn 17 South Tarawa(Kiribati)
- Acorn 18 Espiritu Santo (bomber field 2)
- Acorn 19 Mindoro
- Acorn 20 Majuro
- Acorn 21 Roi-Namur
- Acorn 22 Eniwetok
- Acorn 23 Kwajalein (Ebeye)
- Acorn 24 Los Negros
- Acorn 25 Green Islands
- Acorn 27 Ponam Island
- Acorn 29 Yonabara
- Acorn 30 Jinamoc Tacloban, Leyte
- Acorn 33 Guam - Agana
- Acorn 36 Mariana Islands
- Acorn 38 Saipan
- Acorn 41 Marpi point, Saipan
- Acorn 44 Okinawa
- Acorn 45 Sangley Point, Cavite
- Acorn 46 Marpi, Saipan
- Acorn 47 Puerto Princesa
- Acorn 50 Kobler, Saipan
- Acorn 51 Cebu/Mactan Island
- Acorn 52 Puerto Princesa 84th CB
- Acorn 55 commissioned at the Argus Assembly and Training Unit, Port Hueneme

=== Espiritu Santo war's end ===
At the end of WWII, Espiritu Santo had become the second largest base the U.S. had in the Pacific. To deal with the vast quantities of supplies and equipment staged there the military had to find a solution. It cost too much to send back to the states and would hurt industry by flooding the market with cheap military surplus. Additionally, the Navy was more concerned about discharging men and mothballing ships. The answer was to offer to sell it to the French for 6 cents on the dollar. The French thought they wouldn't offer anything and the U.S would abandon it all. Instead the U.S ordered the Seabees to build a ramp into the sea by Luganville Airfield. There, day after day the surplus went into the water. Seabees wept at what they had to do. Today the site is a tourist attraction called Million Dollar Point. Individual CBs were ordered to do the same across the Pacific.

== CB rates ==
These indicate the construction trade in which a Seabee is skilled. During WWII, the Seabees were the highest-paid group in the U.S. military, due to all the skilled journeymen in their ranks. Camp Endicott had roughly 45 vocational schools plus additional specialized classes. These included Air compressors, Arc welding, BAR, Bridge building, Bulldozer, Camouflage, Carpentry, Concrete, Cranes, Dams, Diving, Diesel engines, Distillation and water purification, Dock building, Drafting, Drilling, Dry docks, Dynamite and demolition, Electricity, Electric motors, First aid, Fire fighting, Gasoline Engines, Generators, Grading roads and airfields, Ice makers, Ignition systems, Judo, Huts and tents, Lubrication, Machine gun, Marine engines, Marston Matting, Mosquito control, Photography, Pile driving, Pipe-fitting/plumbing, Pontoons, Power-shovel operation, Pumps, Radio, Refrigeration, Rifle, Riveting, Road building, Road Scrapers, Sheet metal, Soil testing, Steelworking, Storage tanks wood or steel, Tire repair, Tractor operation, Transformers, Vulcanizing, Water front, and Well-drilling.

- BMCB : Boatswain's Mate Seabee
- CB : Construction Battalion ( first rate in 1942 for all construction trades)
- CMCBB : Carpenter's Mate CB Builder
- CMCBD : Carpenter's Mate CB Draftsman
- CMCBE : Carpenter's Mate CB Excavation foreman
- CMCBS : Carpenter's Mate CB Surveyor
- EMCBC : Electrician's Mate CB Communications
- EMCBD : Electrician's Mate CB Draftsman
- EMCBG : Electrician's Mate CB General
- EMCBL : Electrician's Mate CB Line and Station
- GMCB : Gunner's Mate CB
- GMCBG : Gunner's Mate CB Armorer
- GMCBP : Gunner's Mate CB Powder-man
- MMCBE : Machinist's Mate CB Equipment Operator
- SFCBB : Ship Fitter CB Blacksmith
- SFCBM : Ship Fitter CB Draftsman
- SFCBP : Ship Fitter CB Pipe-fitter and Plumber
- SFCBR : Ship Fitter CB Rigger
- SFCBS : Ship Fitter CB Steelworker
- SFCBW : Ship Fitter CB Welder
- Diver

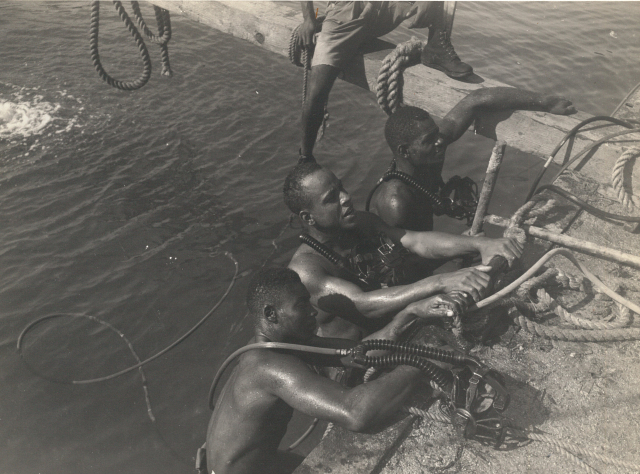
Seabee divers at Gavutu, Solomon Islands, November 8, 1943, installing a marine railway

The Seabees had a divers school of their own to qualify 2nd class divers. During WWII being a diver was not a "rate", it was a "qualification" that had four grades: Master, 1st Class, Salvage, and 2nd Class. CBs would put men in the water from the tropics to the Arctic Circle. In the Aleutians CB 4 had divers doing salvage on the Russian freighter SS Turksib in 42 °F water. In the tropics Seabee divers would be sent close to an enemy airfield to retrieve a Japanese aircraft. At Halavo on Florida Island divers from the 27th CB would recover a Disburser's safe full of money plus change 160 props on vessels of all sizes. The Seabees of the 27th CB alone, logged 2.550 diving hours with 1,345 classified as "extra hazardous". Seabee Underwater Demolition Teams were swimmers during WWII, but postwar transitioned to divers. Another historic note to the Seabees is that they had African American divers in the 34th CB. Those men fabricated their diving gear in the field using Navy Mk-III gas masks as taught at diving school. Twice, while at Milne Bay, the 105th CB sent special diving details on undisclosed missions. At Pearl Harbor Seabee Divers were involved in the salvage of many of the ships hit on 7 December as well as the recovery of bodies for a long time after the attack. Divers in the 301st CB placed as much as 50 tons of explosives a day to keep their dredges productive. However, the divers of CB 96 used 1,727,250 lbs of dynamite to blast 423,300 cubic yards of coral for the Ship repair facility on Manicani Island, at the Naval Operating Base Leyte-Samar. Their primary diving gear was modified Navy Mark III and Navy Mark IV gas masks.

== Organization ==
The primary Seabee unit was the battalion, composed of a headquarters company and four construction companies. Each company could do smaller jobs independently as they each had all the basic ratings for doing any job. Hq. Co. was made up primarily of fleet rates plus surveyors and draftsman. A CB's complement was 32 officers and 1,073 enlisted.

"By 1944 construction projects grew in scope and scale. Often more than one CB was assigned to a job. To promote efficient administrative control 3-4 battalions would be organized into a regiment, if necessary, two or more regiments were organized into a brigade. This happened on Okinawa where 55,000 Seabees deployed. All were under the Commander, Construction Troops, Commodore Andrew G. Bisset (CEC). He also had 45,000 U.S. Army engineers under his command making it the largest concentration of construction troops ever."

At wars end they would number over 258,000. The NCF grew into 12 Naval Construction Brigades of: 54 Construction Regiments, 151 CBs, 39 Special CBs, 136 CB Maintenance Units, 118 CB Detachments, and 5 Pontoon Assembly Detachments. In addition, many Seabees served in the NCDUs, UDTs, Cubs, Lions, Acorns and Marine Corps.

While the CB itself was versatile it was apparent that some units could be smaller and/or specialized for task specific units. "The first departure from the standard CB was the "Special" Construction Battalion, or the "CB Special". "Special" CBs were composed of stevedores and longshoremen who were badly needed for the unloading of cargo in combat zones. Many officers for "Specials" were recruited from the Merchant Marine (and commissioned as CEC) while stevedoring companies were the source of many of the enlisted. Soon, the efficiency of cargo handling in combat zones was on a par to that found in the most efficient ports in the U.S." There were five battalions specialized in pontoons, barges, and causeways: 70th, 81st, 111th, 128th, 302nd. The 134th & 139th CBs were made trucking units due to the transportation and logistic needs on Guam and Okinawa.

"Several types of smaller, specialized units were created. Construction Battalion Maintenance Units/CBMUs, a quarter the size of a CB were one. They were Public Works units intended to assume base maintenance of newly constructed bases. Another unit type was the Construction Battalion Detachment/CBD, of 6 to 600 men. CBDs did everything from running tire-repair shops to operating dredges. Many were tasked with the handling, launching, assembly, installation of pontoon causeways. Others were petroleum dets specializing in pipelines or petroleum facilities."

== The Seabee ==
The Seabee's machinegun-toting bumblebee insignia was created by Frank J. Iafrate, a clerk at the Camp Endicott, Quonset Point, Rhode Island. Iafrate was known for being artistic and a lieutenant asked if he could do a "Disney style" Seabee insignia. He chose the bumblebee for his model. Image-wise they have more "heft" than the honeybee and "heft" suited the whole idea. He put three hours sketching: a sailor's cap, a uniform with petty officer ranks on each arm plus the tools and rates of the gunner's mate, machinist's mate, and carpenter's mate. On each wrist he placed the CEC insignia. For the border he used a letter Q for Quonset Point. He gave the design to the lieutenant. The lieutenant showed it to his captain, who sent it off to Adm. Moreell. The only change the Admiral requested was that the border be changed to a hawser rope in keeping with Naval tradition for Naval insignia.

== Flame throwing tanks, CWS: Flame Tank Group ==
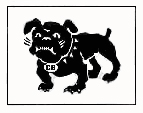
117th CB logo

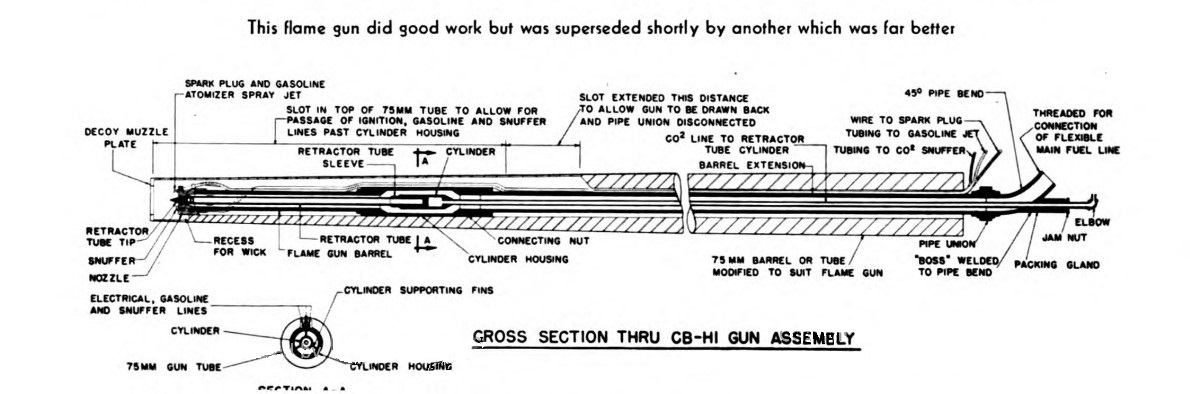
Cross section through a CB-H1 flame thrower

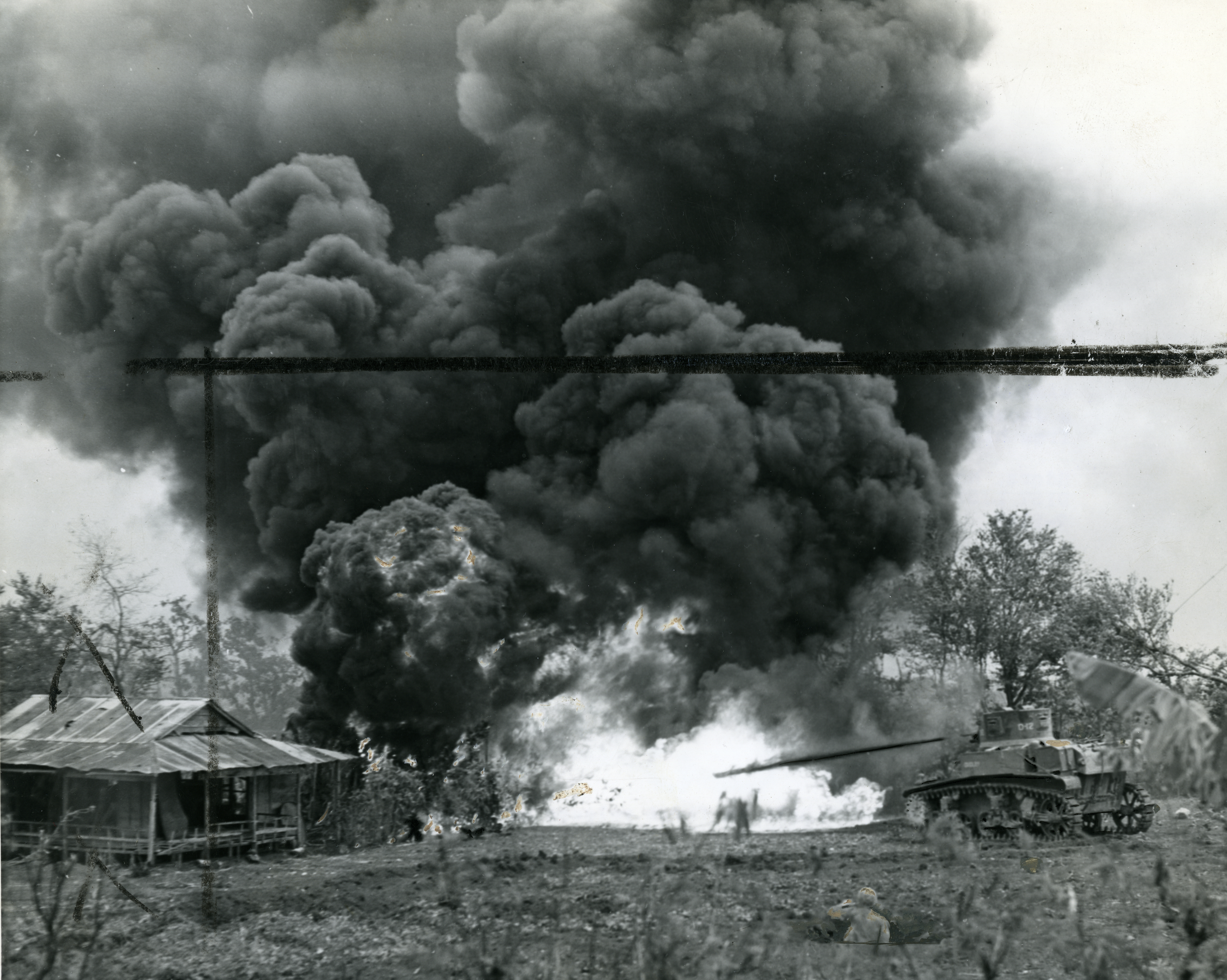
Marines use a "Satan" to incinerate a Japanese pillbox on Siapan.

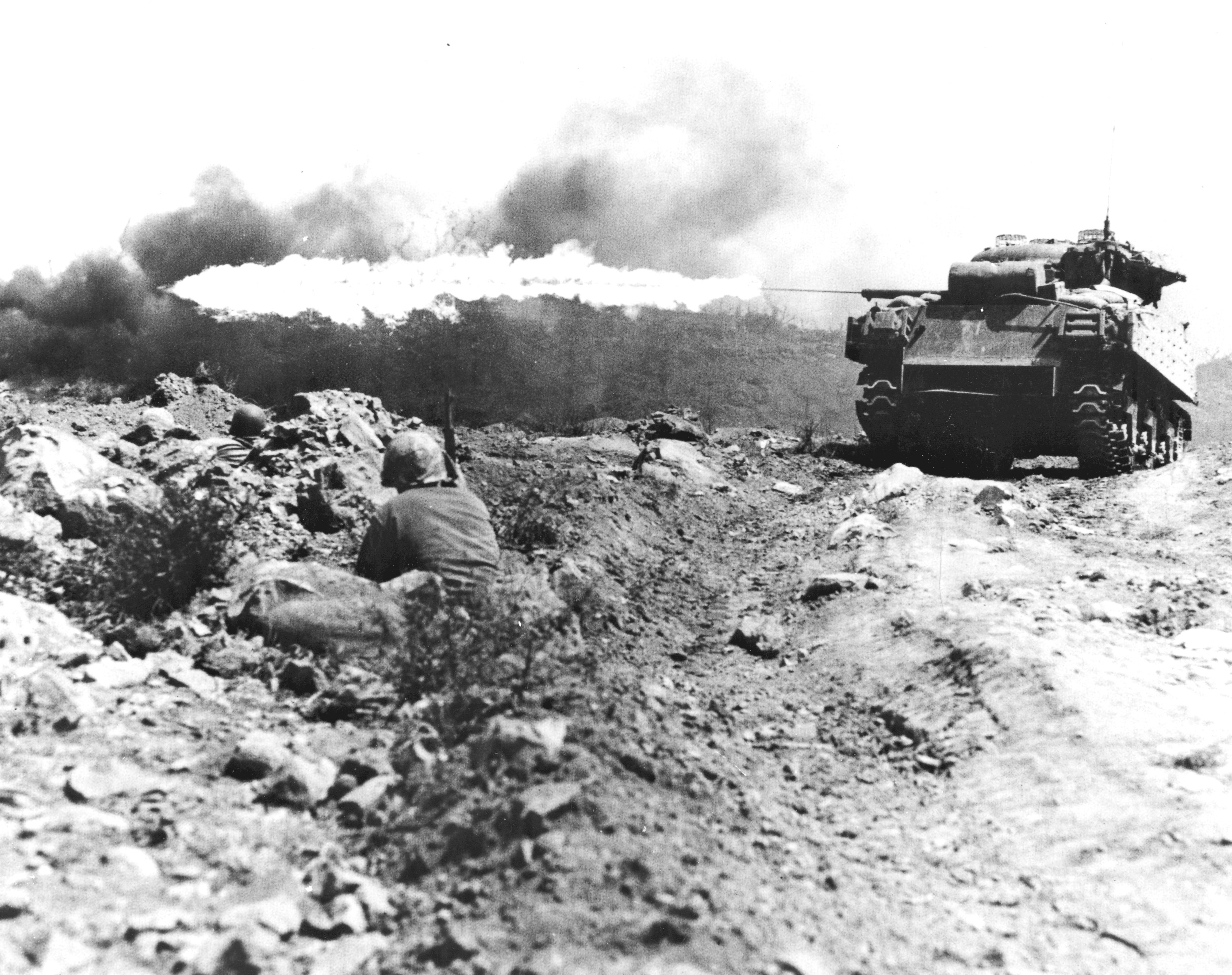
The CB-H2 flamethrower seen here on Iwo Jima had a range of 150 yards.

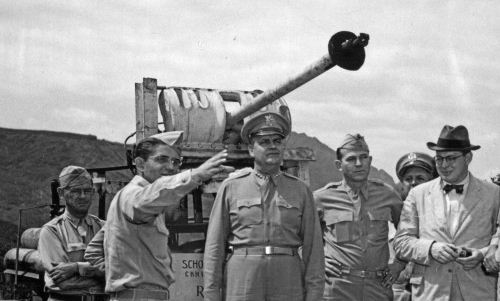
The Seabees' training model of a coaxial H1a-H5a flamethrower shown by Col Unmacht's staff to visitors would not see combat until Korea.

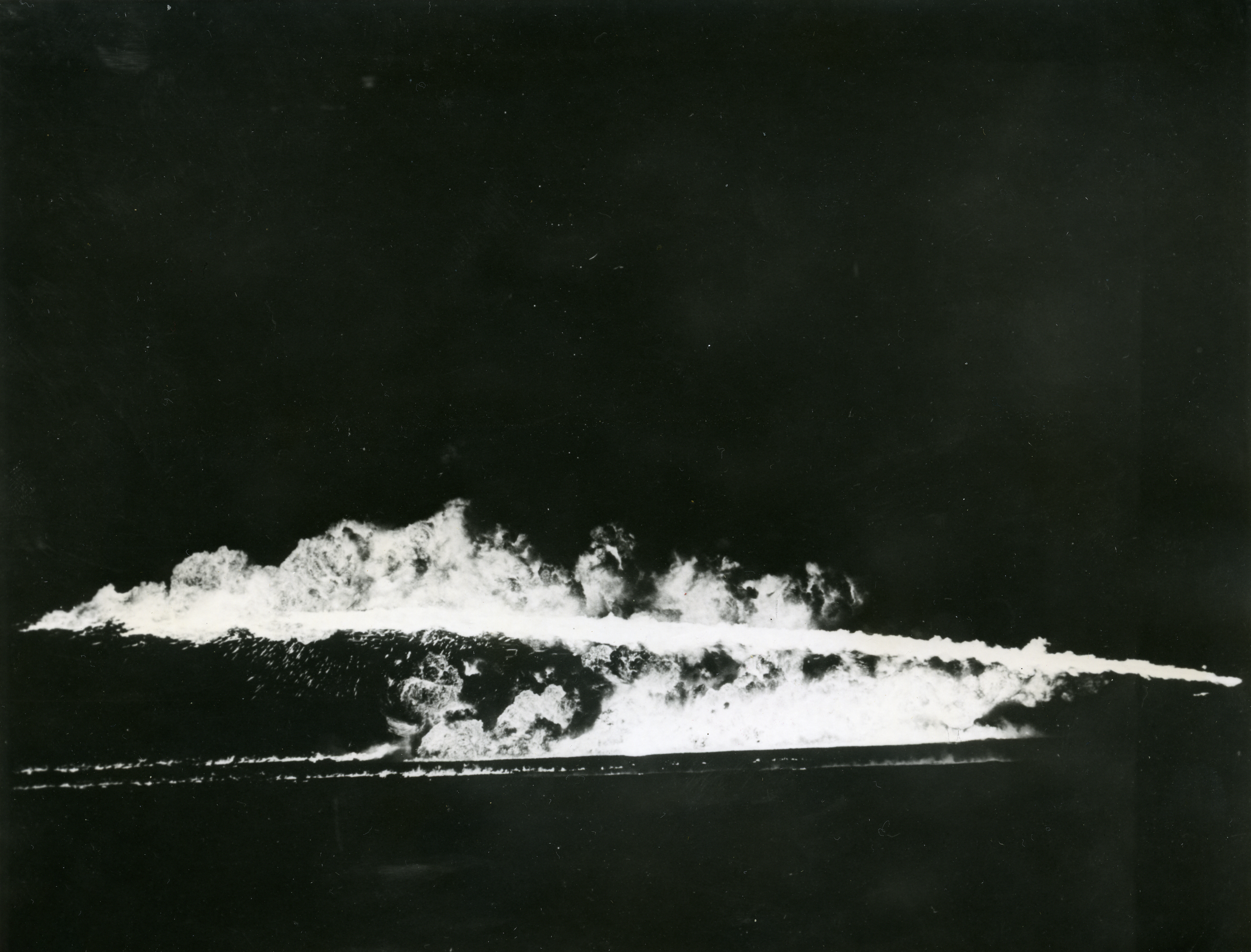
Night demonstration at Schofield Barracks 3 weeks prior to Iwo Jima

During WWII Seabees modified/created all of the main armament flame throwing tanks that the USMC put in the field on Saipan, Tinian, Iwo Jima, and the U.S. Army on Okinawa. They were a weapon Japanese troops feared and the Marine Corps said was the best weapon they had in the taking of Iwo Jima. After Okinawa the Army stated that the tanks had a psychological presence on the battlefield. U.S. troops preferred to follow them over standard armor for the fear they put in the enemy.

Pacific field commanders had tried field modified mechanized flame throwers early on, with the Marine Corps deciding to leave further development to the Army. The Navy had an interest in flame throwing and five Navy Mark I flamethrowers arrived in Hawaii in April 1944. The Navy deemed them "unsuitable" due to their weight and turned them over to the Army's Chemical Warfare Service. In May a top secret composite unit was assembled at Schofield Barracks. It was led by Colonel Unmacht of the US Army Chemical Warfare Service, Central Pacific Area (CENPAC) Col. Unmacht began the project with only the 43rd Chemical Laboratory Company. They modified the first M3 Stuart light tank designating it a "Satan". The flame tank group was expanded with men from the 5th Marine tank battalion and 25 from the 117th CB. The newly attached Seabees went over what the Army had created and concluded it was a little over engineered. They recommended reducing the number of moving parts from over a hundred to a half dozen.

V Amphibious Corps (VAC) wanted mechanized flamethrowing capabilities for the Marianas operations. VAC had ordered and received two shipments of Canadian Ronson F.U.L. Mk IV flamethrowers (30 flamethrowers in total) to field modify tanks. With a war to wage field modification was much quicker than going through official military procurement channels. The 117th CB was assigned to the upcoming Saipan operation. Col Unmacht worked out an arrangement to not only keep the 117th Seabees he had, but get more. Augmented by the additional Seabees, the group worked sun up to sundown and, with Seabee Can-do twenty-four M3s were modified to start the campaign. The very first, made by the 43rd Co, was christened "Hells Afire". The installation configuration of the flamethrower components limited the turret's traverse to 180°. As Satans were produced Colonel Unmacht had the Seabees conduct a comprehensive series of 40-hour classes on flame tank operation with first and second echelon maintenance. First, for officers and enlisted of the Marine Corps and then later for the Army. The Satans had a range of 40–80 yd (37–73 m) and were the first tanks to have the main armament swapped for flame throwers. They were divided between the 2nd and 4th Marine Divisions and made D Company of the tank battalions. They saw combat on Siapan and Tinian with Tinian being more favorable to their use.

- Four Seabees received Navy/Marine Corps commendations for their work from Lt. Gen. Holland M. Smith Commanding General(USMC) FMF Pacific.
- At least 7 were awarded the Bronze Star.

Mid-September the Army decided to officially form a CWS "Flame Thrower Group" with Col Unmacht requesting 56 additional Seabees. The group included more Army CWS and 81st Ordnance men as well. It was apparent that a larger flamethrower on a bigger tank would be more desirable, but very few tanks were available for conversion. Operation Detachment was next and Col Unmacht's group located eight M4A3 Sherman medium tanks for it. The Seabees worked to combine the best elements from three different flame units: the Ronson, the Navy model I and those Navy Mk-1s the Navy gave up. MMS1c A.A. Reiche and EM2c Joseph Kissel are credited with designing the CB-H1. Installation required 150 lb (68 kg) of welding rod, 1100 electrical connections, and cost between $20,000-25,000 per tank(adj. for inflation $288,000-$360,000 in 2019). The CB-H1 flamethrower operated at 300 psi (20 atm) which gave it a range of 400 ft (120 m) and could transverse 270°. This model was quickly superseded by the CB-H2 that was far better. EM2c Kissel and SF1c J.T. Patterson accompanied the tanks to oversee maintenance during the battle. Kissel filled in as an assistant driver/gunner with tank crews on 20 days of the operation.

In November 1944 the Fleet Marine Force had requested 54 mechanized flame throwers, nine for each of the Marine Corps Divisions On Iwo the tanks all landed D-day and went into action on D+2, sparingly at first. As the battle progressed, portable flame units sustained casualty rates up to 92%, leaving few troops trained to use the weapon. More and more calls came for the Mark-1s to the point that the Marines became dependent upon the tanks and would hold up their assault until a flame tank was available. Since each tank battalion had only four they were not assigned. Rather, they were "pooled" and would dispatch from their respective refueling locations as the battle progressed. For Okinawa the 10th Army decided that the entire 713th Tank Battalion would provisionally convert to flame. The Battalion was tasked to support both the Army and the Marine Corps assault. It was ordered to Schofield Barracks on Nov 10. There the Seabees supervised three officers and 60 enlisted of the 713th convert all 54 of their tanks to Ronsons. The Ronsons did not have the range of either the CB-H1 or CB-H2.

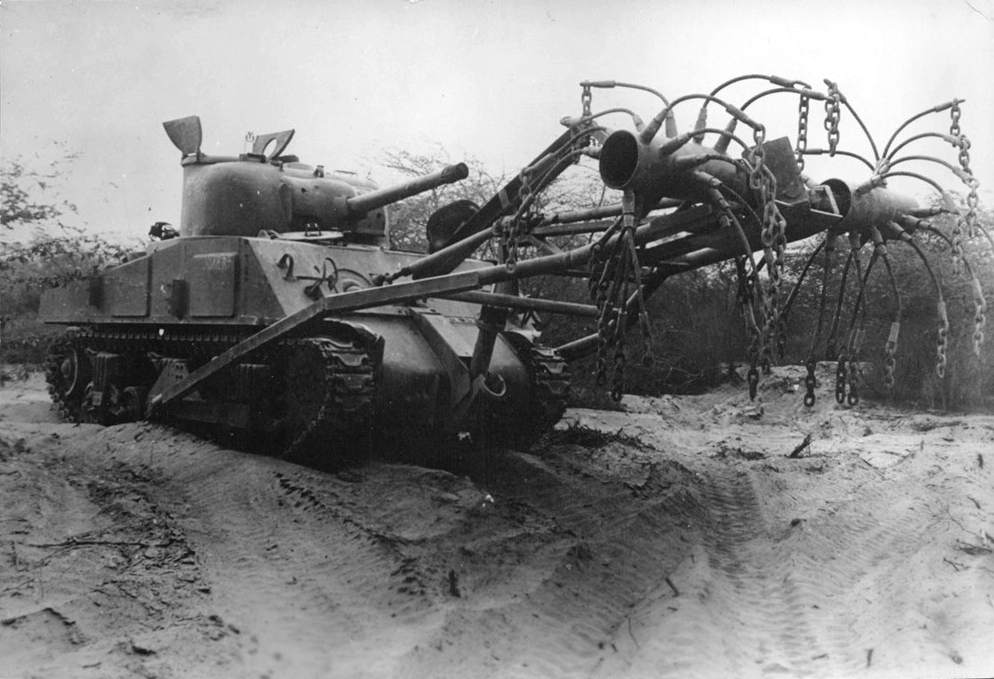
Two M4-Shermans were also field modified with flails by Marines and the 127th CB. They passed testing in Hawaii and were sent to Iwo Jima also.

== Seabee Awards in the NCF ==
During WWII Seabees would be awarded 5 Navy Crosses, 33 Silver Stars, and over 2000 Purple Hearts. Many would receive citations and commendations from the Marine Corps. The most decorated officer was Lt. Jerry Steward (CEC): Navy Cross, Purple Heart with 3 Gold Stars, Army Distinguished Unit Badge with Oak leaf and the Philippine Distinguished Service Star. Another CEC with an unusual set of awards was Capt. Wilfred L. Painter: Legion of Merit with Combat "V" and 4 Gold Stars.

Presidential Unit Citation USN/USMC :

- 75 men 3rd CB, Guadalcanal, USS Enterprise
- 6th CB, Guadalcanal, 1st Marine Division
- 202 men 33rd CB, Peleliu, 1st Marine Pioneers
- 241 men, 73rd CB, Peleliu, 1st Marine Pioneers

U.S. Army Distinguished Unit Citation :

- 40th CB Los Negros, 1st Cavalry Division
- 12 men 78th CB Los Negros, 1st Cavalry Division

Navy Unit Commendation

- 3rd Naval Construction Detachment- Espiritu Santo
- 11th Special CB, Okinawa
- 31st CB, Iwo Jima, 5th Marine Shore party Regiment
- 33rd CB, Peleliu 1st Marine Pioneers
- 58th CB, Vella Lavella
- 62nd CB, Iwo Jima, V Amphibious Corps
- 71st CB, Okinawa
- 53 men 113th CB, PT boat Advance Base Construction Detachment, Balikpapan Borneo/Philippines
- 133rd CB, Iwo Jima, 23rd Marine Regiment
- 301st CB, Siapan, Tinian, Guam, Peleliu, Iwo Jima, Okinawa
- CBMU 515, Guam, 22nd Marine Regiment
- CBMU 617, Okinawa
- CBMU 624, Okinawa
- CBD 1006, Sicily

U.S.Army Meritorious Unit Commendation

- 60th CB, Los Negros, 1st Cavalry Division

== Seabee Awards outside the NCF ==
Seabees serving outside the NCF received numerous awards as well. The Navy does not make a distinction for awards given inside or outside the NCF nor does it identify Seabees in the NCDUs or UDTs awards. Admiral Turner recommended over 60 Silver Stars and over 300 Bronze Stars with Combat "Vs" for the Seabees and other service members of UDTs 1-7 That was unpresendented in USN/USMC history. At Guam and Tinian all UDT officers received silver stars and all enlisted received bronze stars with Combat "Vs".

Presidential Unit Citation USN/USMC

- 3rd Battalion 18th Marines (18th CB) Tarawa, 2nd Marine Division
- 14 men of 3rd Battalion 20th Marines (121st CB) Saipan and Tinian 4th Marine Division
- Naval Combat Demolition Units assault force O Normandy
  - NCDU 11, NCDU 22, NCDU 23, NCDU 27, NCDU 41, NCDU 42, NCDU 43, NCDU 44, NCDU 45, NCDU 46, NCDU 128, NCDU 129, NCDU 130, NCDU 131, NCDU 133, NCDU 137
- UDT 11 Bruni Bay, Borneo
- UDT 11 Balikpapan, Borneo

Navy Unit Commendation

- 3rd Battalion 22nd Marines [1st Naval Construction Detachment(Bobcats), & A Company 3rd CB] Eniwetok
- ACORN 14, Tarawa, 2nd Marine Division
- Naval Combat Demolition Units force U Normandy
  - NCDU 25, NCDU 26, NCDU 28, NCDU 29, NCDU 30, NCDU 127, NCDU 132, NCDU 134, NCDU 135, NCDU 136, NCDU 139
- UDT 4, Guam
- UDT 4, Leyte
- UDT 4, Okinawa
- UDT 7, Marianas
- UDT 7, Western Carolina's

The Seabee Record

== Post-war legacy ==
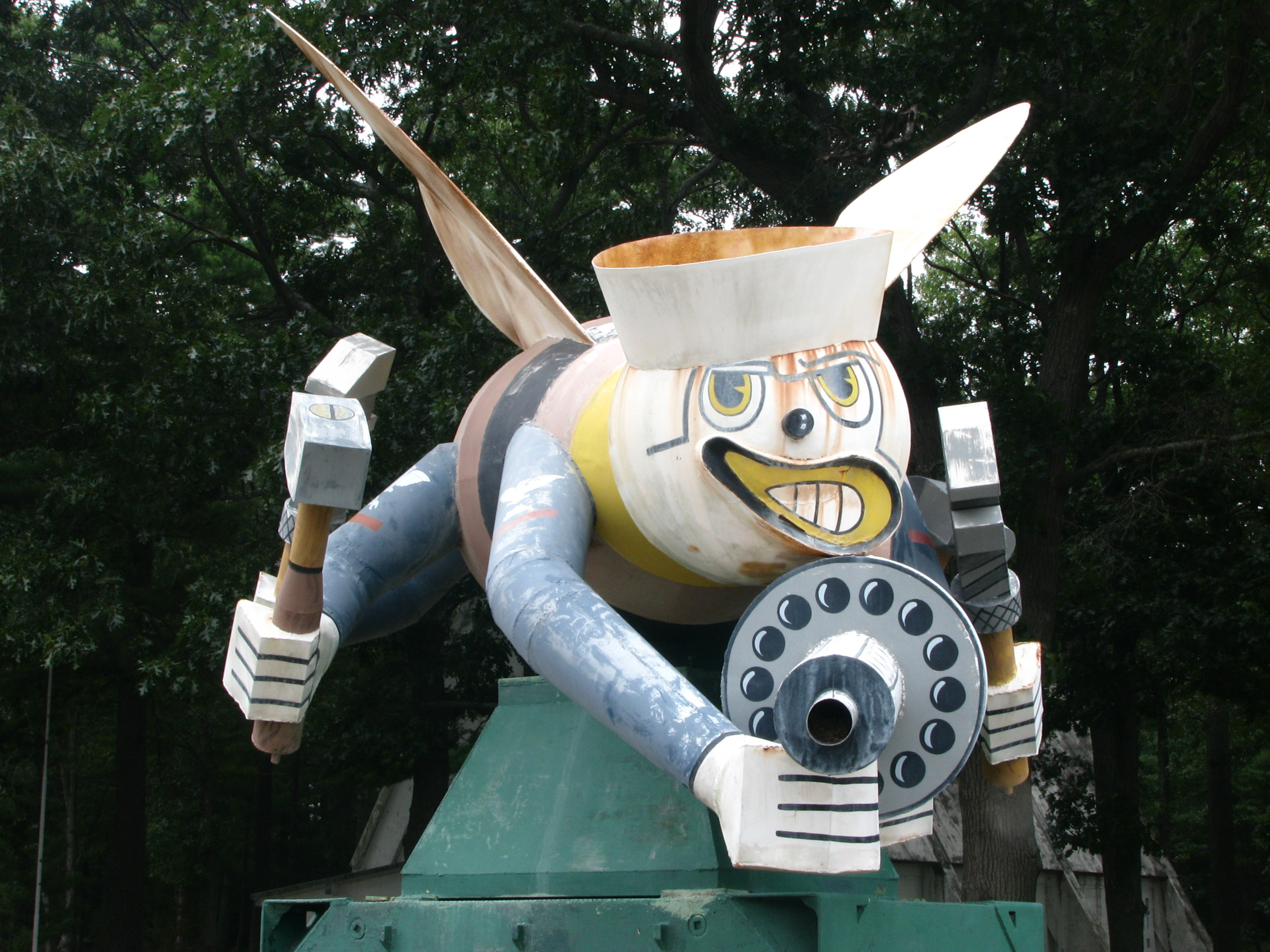
The Fighting Seabee Statue at Quonset Point, where the Seabee Museum and Memorial Park commemorates Camp Endicott, which is on the National Register of Historic Places

During the war many of the bases the Seabees built were disassembled for the materials to be reused in new bases closer to the front. However, the airfields could not be moved and remained post war. The Seabees built or repaired dozens across the Pacific. Today, after upgrades and modernization, many are still in use or remain usable.

WWII Airfields in use today:

Pacific:

- Abemama Atoll Airport (95th CB)
- Alexai Point Army Airfield and Casco Cove Coast Guard Station (114th & 138th CBs)
- Andersen Air Force Base (5th Construction Brigade)
- Awase Airfield (34th, 36th CBs)
- Bauerfield International Airport ( 1st CB)
- Bonriki International Airport (3rd Bn 18th Marines)
- Bucholz Army Airfield (109th CB with CBs 74, 107, & 3rd Bn 20th Marines)
- Carney Airfield used until the 1970s (CB 14 abandoned)
- Central Field (Iwo Jima) (CBs 31,62, 133)
- Daniel Z. Romualdez Airport (88th CB)
- Dulag Airfield (61st CB)
- East Field (Saipan) (51st CB) The airfield is on the National Register of Historic Places as the "Isley Field Historic District", and is part of the National Historic Landmark District on Saipan.
- Emirau Airport (out of service but remains usable)
- Enewetak Auxiliary Airfield (110th CB)
- Falalop Airfield (51st CB)
- Faleolo International Airport (CB 1)
- Finschhafen Airport (60th CB and U.S. Army)
- French Frigate Shoals Airport (B Co. CB 5)
- Freeflight International Airport (3rd Bn 20th Marines & 109th CB)
- Funafuti International Airport (2nd CB detachment)
- Fuaʻamotu International Airport (1st CB)
- Guasopa Airport/Woodlark Airfield (60th CB)
- Guam International Airport/NAS Agana (103rd CB, 5th Construction Brigade)
- Guiuan Airport (61st & 93RD CBs)
- Hawkins Field (3rd Bn 18th Marines, CBs 74 & 98)
- Haleiwa Fighter Strip (14th CB)
- Henderson Field (Midway Atoll)
- Hihifo Airport (Seabees)
- Honiara International Airport/ Henderson Field (Guadalcanal) (CBs 6, 14, 18)
- Honolulu International Airport NAS Honolulu – John Rodgers Field (5th CB with CBs 13, 64, & 133)
- Johnston Island Air Force Base (CBs 5, 10, & 99)
- Kornasoren Airport (Yeburro Airfield) 95th CB
- Kukum Field used until 1969 (CBs 6, 26, 46, 61)
- La Tontouta International Airport (seabees)
- Leo Wattimena Airport
- Losuia Airport/Kiriwina Airfield (60th CB)
- Luganville Airfield used until the mid-1970s (40th CB)
- Mactan-Benito Ebuen Air Base (54th CB, Cub 51)
- Majuro Airfield (100th CB used 20 years postwar)
- Marpi Point Field (51st CB & CBMU 614) The airfield is on the National Register of Historic Places as the "Isley Field Historic District", and is part of the National Historic Landmark District on Saipan.
- Marine Corps Air Station Kaneohe Bay (CBs 56, 112, 74)
- Momote Airport (40th CB)
- Mono Airport (87th CB)
- Mopah International Airport (55th CB)
- Munda Airport (CBs 24, 47, 63, 7)
- Nanumea Airfield (16th CB)
- Nausori International Airport ( Seabees)
- Naval Base Guam (5th Naval Construction Brigade)
- Naval Air Base Tanapag (39th CB), site of NTTU Saipan (Naval Technical Training Unit – CIA, used postwar until 1962)
- Naval Air Station Kaneohe (CBs 56, 74, 112)
- Naval Station Sangley Point is now Danilo Atienza Air Base(PAF) and Naval Base Cavite(PN) (77th CB,12th Construction Regiment)
- Nissan Island Airport (93rd CB)
- North Field (Tinian) The airfield is an element of the Tinian National Historic Landmark District. (6th Construction Brigade) (NMCB 28)
- Northwest Field (Guam) (53rd and 94th CB semi-abandoned)
- Nouméa Magenta Airport (11th CB)
- Nukufetau Airfield (Motolalo Airfield) 16th CB
- Ondonga Airfield (CBs 37 & 82)
- Orote Field (5th Naval Construction Brigade)
- Palmyra (Cooper) Airport (Seabees)
- Palikulo Bay Airfield ( 7th & 15th CBs)
- Penrhyn atoll has the Tongareva Airport (Seabees)
- Piva Airfield ( CBs 25, 53, 71, & 74)
- Point Barrow Naval Arctic Research Laboratory Airfield (CBD 1058) Runway and two hangars intact 2014
- Puerto Princesa International Airport (CB 84)
- Rota International Airport (48th CB)
- Santo-Pekoa International Airport ( CBs 3, 7, 15)
- Saipan International Airport (3rd Bn 20th Marines/CB 121) The airfield is on the National Register of Historic Places as the "Isley Field Historic District", and is part of the National Historic Landmark District on Saipan.
- South Field (Iwo Jima) (CBs 31, 64, & 133 abandoned post-war)
- Segi Point Airfield (47th CB)
- Seghe Airport (47th CB)9
- Tontouta Air Base (53rd CB)
- Torokina Airfield (CBs 25, 53, 71, & 75)
- Umiat Airport (CBD 1058)
- Wake Island (85th CB)
- West Field (Tinian) Today is Tinian International Airport. (6th Construction Brigade)
- Yandina Airport (CBs 33 & 35)
- Yomitan Auxiliary Airfield (71st & 87th CB)
- Yonabaru Airfield ( 145th CB)

Atlantic:

- Naval Air Station Port Lyautey/Kenitra Air Base (120th CB)
- Naval Communication Station Sidi Yahya (120th CB)

Military installations WWII:

- Casco Cove Coast Guard Station (22nd CB)
- Lombrum Naval Base (CBs 11, 58, 71)
- Naval Base Guam (5th Naval Brigade)
- Subic Bay Naval Station now Subic Bay Freeport Zone
- Awase Airfield JCC Radio Transmitter Station, 1945; today Comm Station AN/FRT-95(A) program LF transmitters supporting Commander Submarine Group SEVEN (34th CB, MCB 7)

== See also ==
- 17th Marine Regiment (Engineer) 19th CB
- 18th Marine Regiment (Engineer) 18th CB
- 19th Marine Regiment (Engineer) 25th CB
- 20th Marine Regiment (Engineer) 121st CB
- Military engineering of the United States
- Seabees Memorial
- United States Navy Argus Units with Acorn Units

== Notes ==
- On Johnson atoll the 1st Marine Defense Battalion detachment named each of its batteries. One them was made up of four 3" AA guns and called the "Seabee battery".
