= Pinipel Island =

Island in Bougainville

Coordinates: 4°24′S 154°08′E

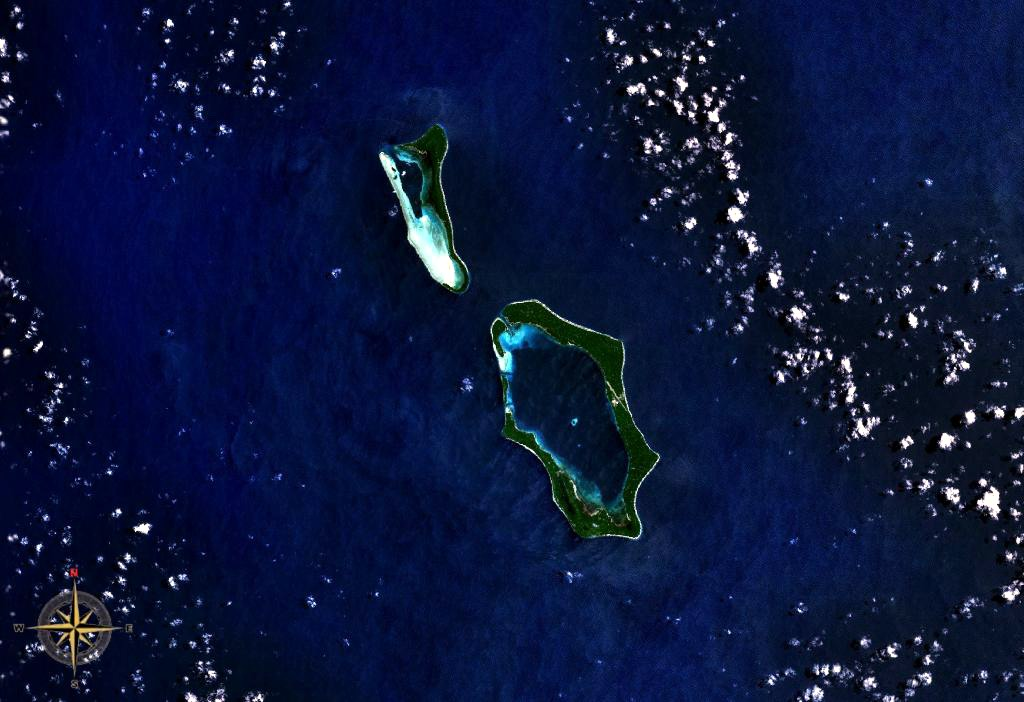
NASA Satellite Image of Green Islands, with Pinipel in the north

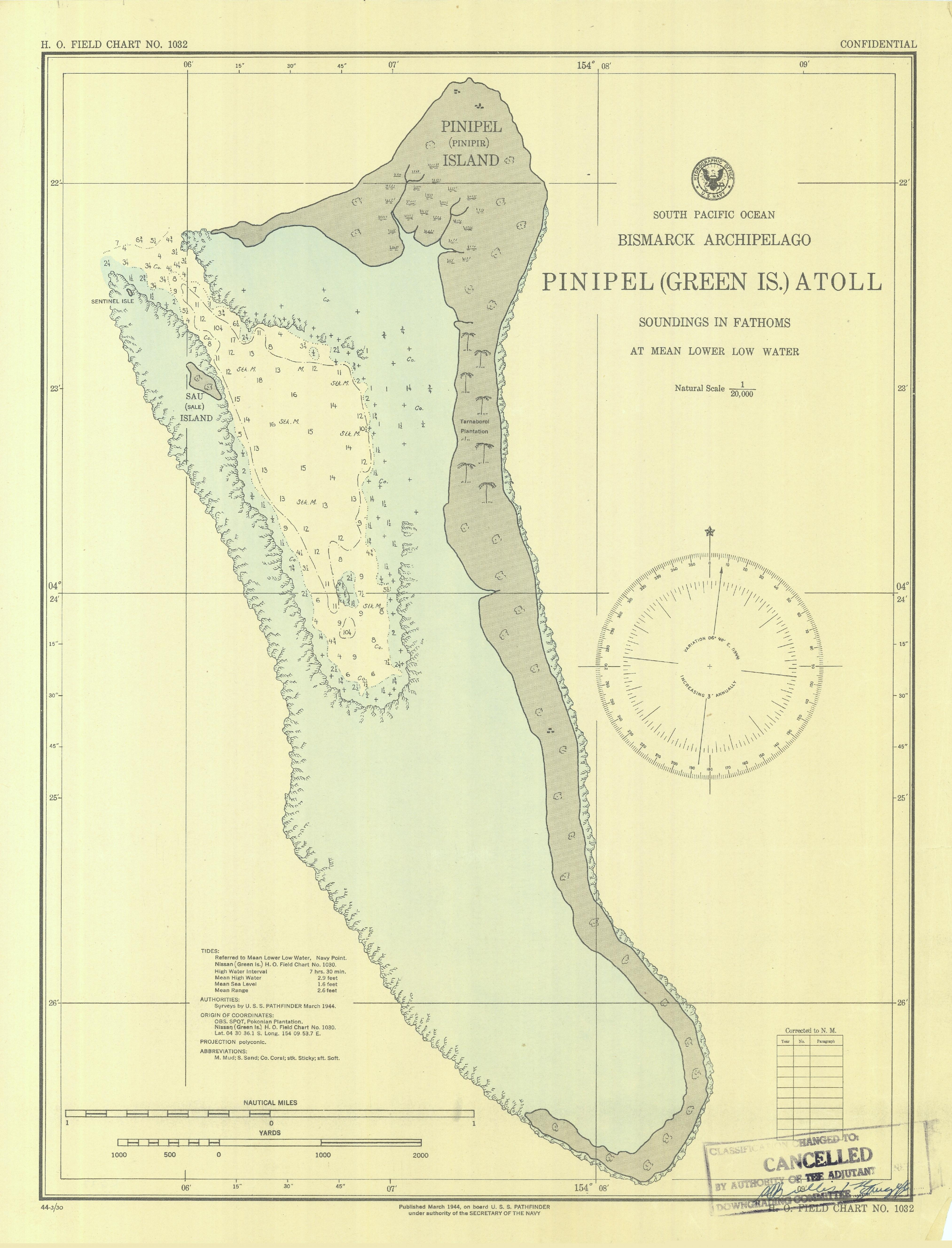
Map of Pinipel

Pinipel Island, also known as Green Island, is the northern of the two atolls making up the Green Islands, east of New Ireland, Papua New Guinea. It is located north of Nissan Island, the southern atoll. It is about 330 feet (101 m) high and cliffy, from 200 to 500 yards (183 to 457 m) wide, except at the north end.

The namesake main island of the atoll makes up for most of its land area. In addition, there are two tiny islets in the north-western part of the atoll, Sentinel Island and Sau (Sale) Island. The population of the atoll, all on the main island, was 901 at the census of population of 2000, distributed among three villages:

1. Mantoia, in the north of the main island (pop. 394)
2. Teah (279), close east of Mantoia
3. Rogos, also called Rokus, in the central part of the main island (228)
