= Barahun Island =

Island in Papua New Guinea

Coordinates: 4°30′S 154°10′E

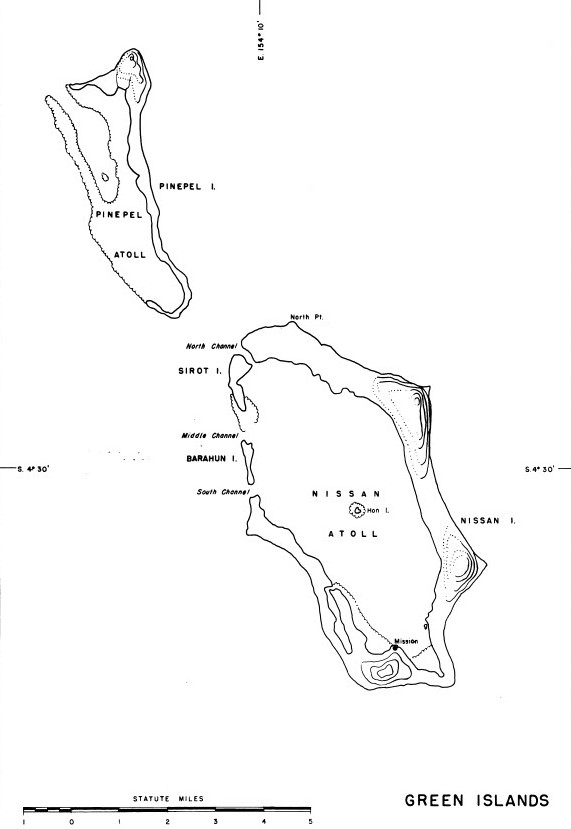
Map showing Baharun Island

Barahun Island is a small island of the Green Islands archipelago, in the Autonomous Region of Bougainville of northeastern Papua New Guinea.

It is located between Nissan Island and Sirot Island of the archipelago, and east of New Ireland island.
