= Sirot Island =

Island in Papua New Guinea

Coordinates: 4°28′S 154°10′E

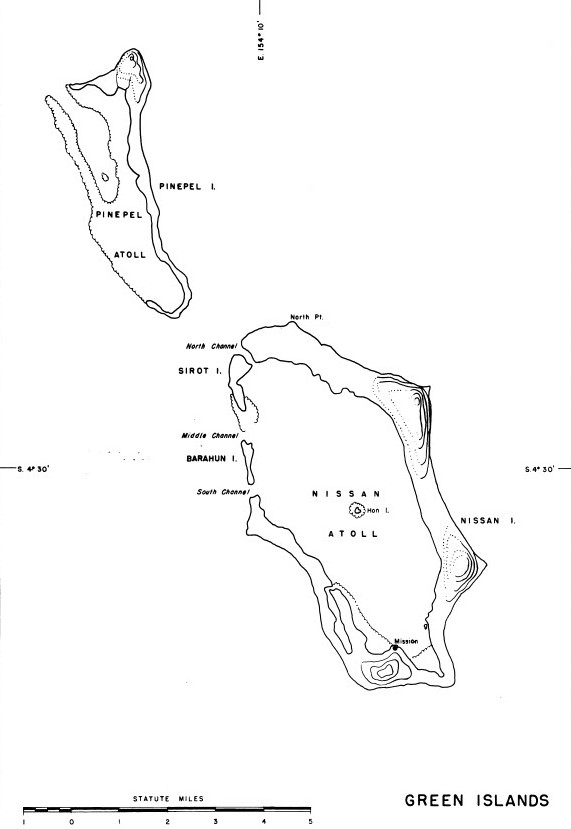
Map showing Sirot Island

Sirot Island is an island of Papua New Guinea in the Green Islands, east of New Ireland. It is off the north-west coast of Nissan Island, north of Barahun Island. It is 1.25 miles (2.01 km) long.
