= USS LST-451 =

1942 LST-1-class tank landing ship

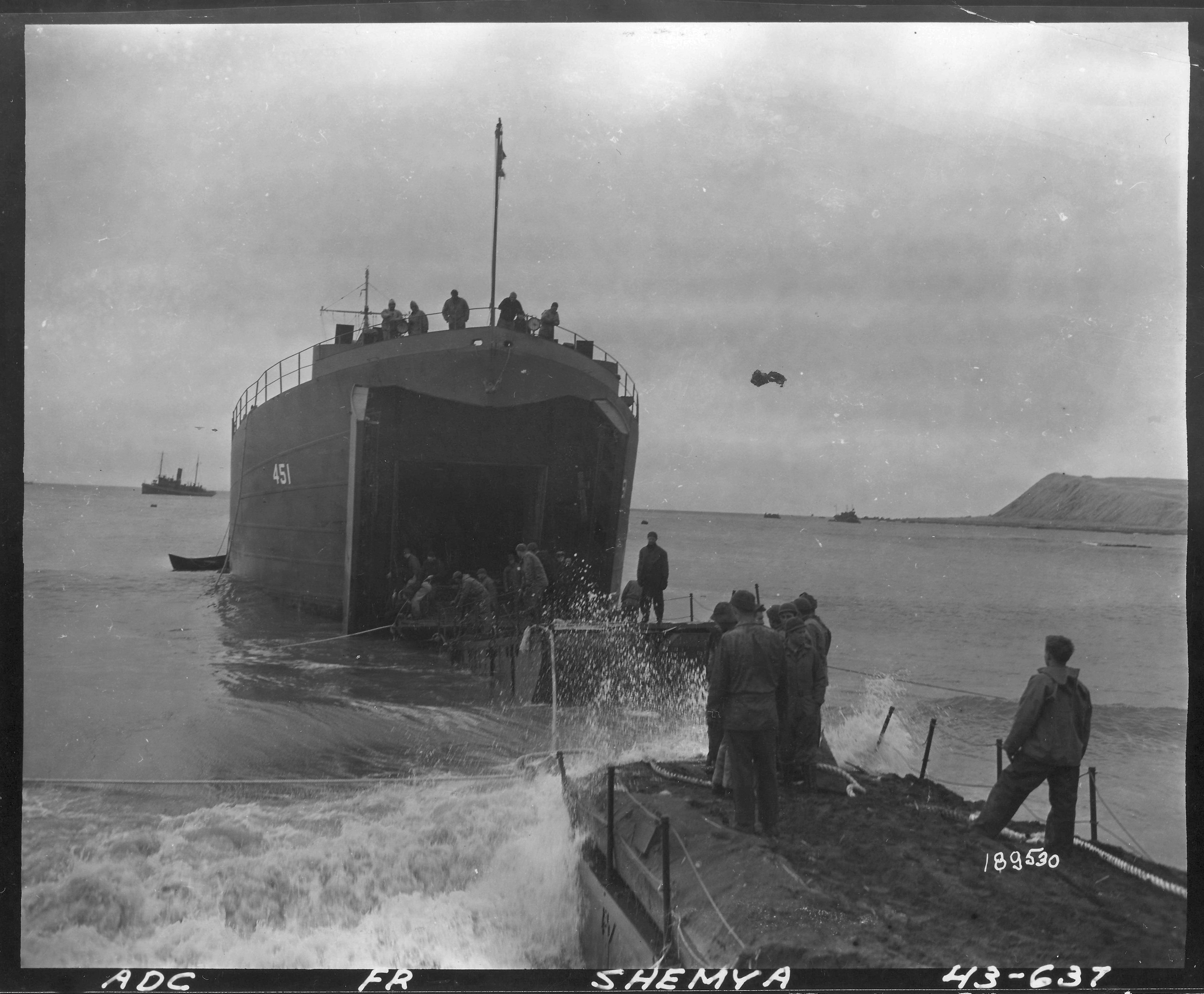
- Army 18th Engineers build a dirt filled barge ramp to enable off loading of their equipment from USS LST-451 while the ship is beached at the Aleutian Island of Shemya, Alaska, 1 June 1943.

History

United States
- Name: LST-451
- Ordered: as a Type S3-M-K2 hull, MCE hull 971
- Builder: Kaiser Shipbuilding Company, Vancouver, Washington
- Yard number: 155
- Laid down: 20 July 1942
- Launched: 6 October 1942
- Commissioned: 12 January 1943
- Decommissioned: 22 July 1946
- Identification: Hull symbol: LST-451; Code letters: NFEQ
- Honors and awards: 5 × battle stars
- Fate: Sold for scrapping, 11 December 1947

General characteristics
- Class & type: LST-1-class tank landing ship
- Displacement: 4,080 long tons (4,145 t) full load; 2,160 long tons (2,190 t) landing
- Length: 328 ft (100 m) oa
- Beam: 50 ft (15 m)
- Draft: Full load: 8 ft 2 in (2.49 m) forward; 14 ft 1 in (4.29 m) aft; Landing at 2,160 t: 3 ft 11 in (1.19 m) forward; 9 ft 10 in (3.00 m) aft
- Installed power: 2 × 900 hp (670 kW) Electro-Motive Diesel 12-567A diesel engines; 1,700 shp (1,300 kW)
- Propulsion: 1 × Falk main reduction gears; 2 × Propellers
- Speed: 12 kn (22 km/h; 14 mph)
- Range: 24,000 nmi (44,000 km; 28,000 mi) at 9 kn (17 km/h; 10 mph) while displacing 3,960 long tons (4,024 t)
- Boats & landing craft carried: 2 or 6 x LCVPs
- Capacity: 2,100 tons oceangoing maximum; 350 tons main deckload
- Troops: 16 officers, 147 enlisted men
- Complement: 13 officers, 104 enlisted men
- Armament: Varied, ultimate armament; 2 × twin 40 mm (1.57 in) Bofors guns; 4 × single 40 mm Bofors guns; 12 × 20 mm (0.79 in) Oerlikon cannons

Service record
- Part of: LST Flotilla 3
- Operations: Capture and occupation of Saipan (15 June–30 July 1944); Tinian Capture and occupation (24–30 July 1944); Leyte landings (20 October 1944); Lingayen Gulf landings (4–15 January 1945); Assault and occupation of Okinawa Gunto (1–9 April 1945)
- Awards: Combat Action Ribbon; Navy Unit Commendation; American Campaign Medal; Asiatic–Pacific Campaign Medal; World War II Victory Medal; Navy Occupation Service Medal w/Asia Clasp

USS LST-451 was a United States Navy LST-1-class tank landing ship used in the Asiatic-Pacific Theater during World War II.

== Construction ==
LST-451 was laid down on 20 July 1942, under Maritime Commission (MARCOM) contract, MC hull 971, by Kaiser Shipyards, Vancouver, Washington; launched on 6 October 1942; and commissioned on 21 January 1943.

== Service history ==
During the war, LST-451 was assigned to the Pacific Theater of Operations.To start she made runs to the Aleutian Islands delivering materials to the Army's 18th Combat Engineers and the 45th Naval Construction Battalion. In February gale force winds broke her mooring lines and she was holed and beached at Lash Bay, Tanaga Island in the Aleutians. Seabees from CB 45 worked 24-hour shifts over five days to save her and the 800-ton oil cargo. They got her patched sufficiently for the USS Ute to tow her to a repair facility. She took part in the capture and occupation of Saipan in June and July 1944; the Tinian capture and occupation in July 1944; the Battle of Leyte landings October 1944; the Lingayen Gulf landings January 1945; and the assault and occupation of Okinawa Gunto April 1945.

== Post-war service ==
Following the war, LST-451 performed occupation duty in the Far East until mid-February 1946. She returned to the United States and was decommissioned on 22 July 1946, and struck from the Navy list on 25 September, that same year. On 11 December 1947, the tank landing ship was sold to the Learner Co., Oakland, California, and subsequently scrapped.

== Honors and awards ==
LST-451 earned five battle stars for her World War II service.

== Notes ==
Citations

== Bibliography ==
Online resources

- "LST-451". Dictionary of American Naval Fighting Ships. Naval History and Heritage Command. This article incorporates text from this source, which is in the public domain.
- "Kaiser Vancouver, Vancouver WA". www.ShipbuildingHistory.com. 27 November 2010.
- "USS LST-451". NavSource. 9 October 2015.
