= Green Islands (Papua New Guinea) =

Island group in Papua New Guinea

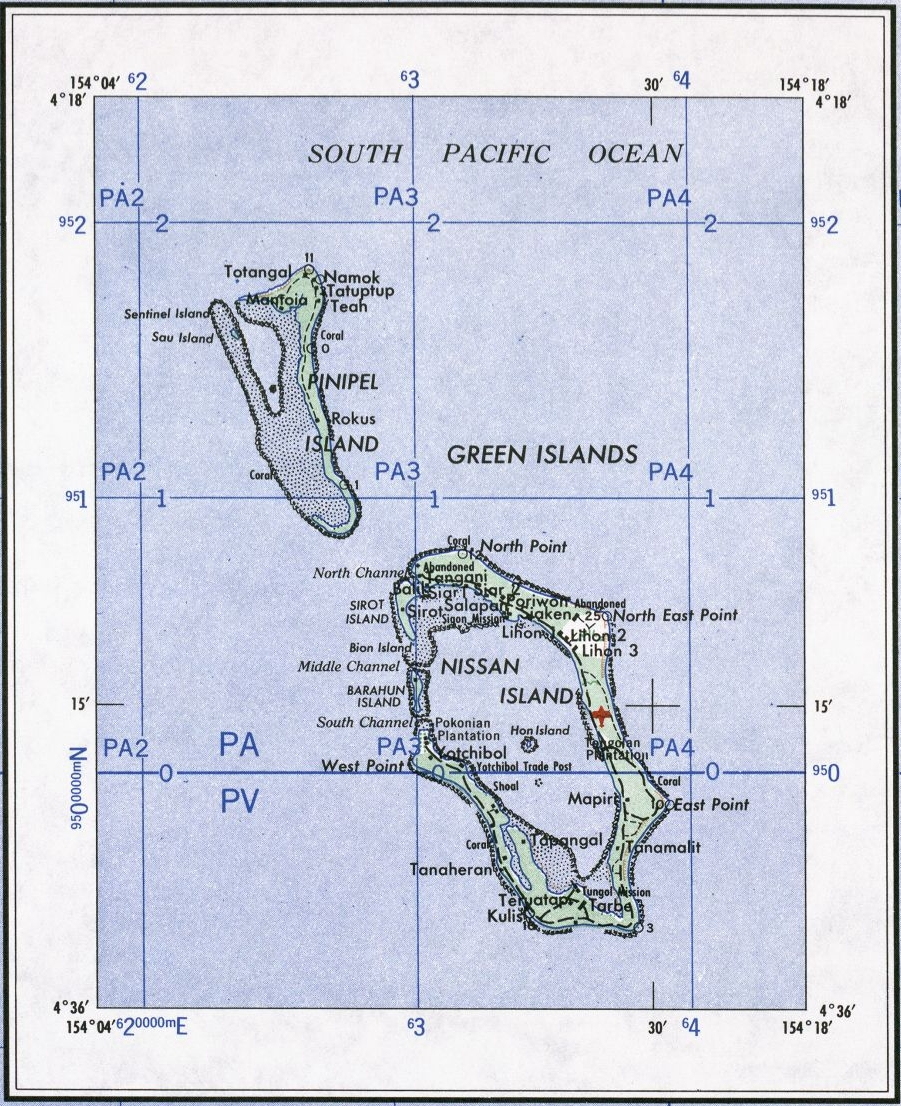
Map of the islands

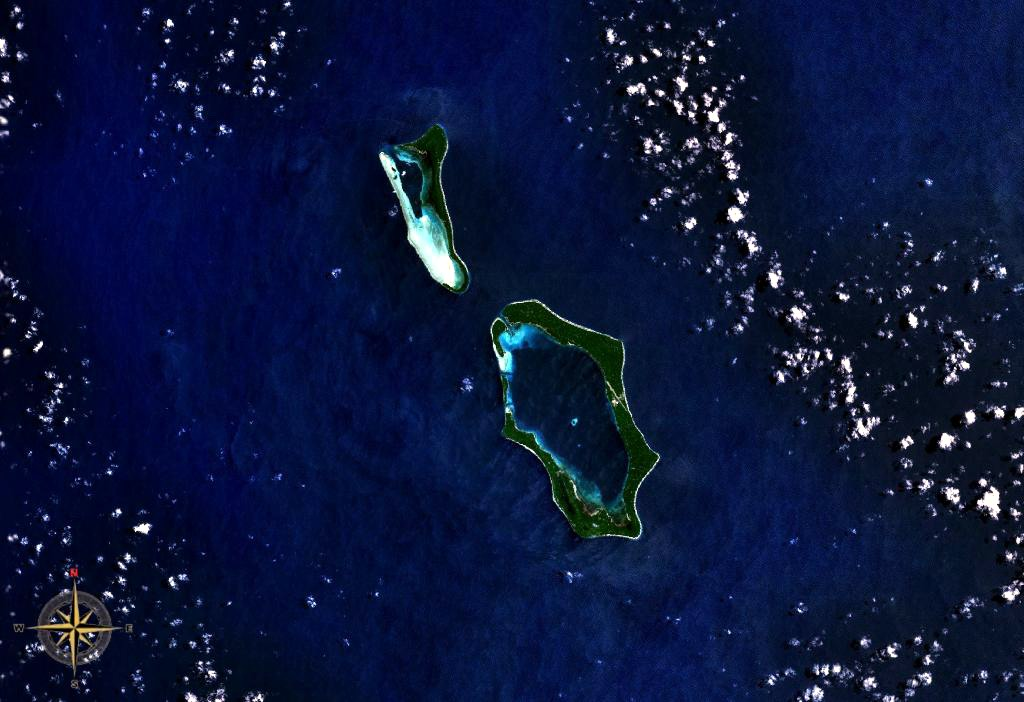
Green Islands in the Solomon Sea, seen from space

The Green Islands is a small archipelago of islands in the Solomon Sea, within the Autonomous Region of Bougainville, in northeastern Papua New Guinea.

They are located at 4°30′S 154°10′E, about 200 km (124 mi) northwest of Bougainville Island, and about 200 km (124 mi) east of Rabaul and New Britain island.

During World War II the United States Navy's Seabees built a large PT Boat base on the Green Islands.

== Islands ==
- Nissan Island — the largest island of the group
- Pinipel Island
- Barahun Island
- Sirot Island
- Sau Island

== See also ==
- Battle of the Green Islands
- Archipelagoes of Papua New Guinea
